= List of rural localities in Kursk Oblast =

Map of Russia with Kursk Oblast highlighted

This is a list of rural localities in Kursk Oblast. Kursk Oblast (Russian: Курская область, romanized: Kurskaya oblast, IPA: [ˈkurskəjə ˈobləsʲtʲ]) is a federal subject of Russia (an oblast). Its administrative center is the city of Kursk. Population: 1,127,081 (2010 Census).

== Locations ==
- 1st Banino
- 1st Chaplygina
- 1st Gnezdilovo
- 1st Mokva
- 1st Rojdenstvenskoe
- 2nd Banino
- 2nd Gnezdilovo
- 2nd Mokva
- 2nd Rojdenstvenskoe
- Belaya
- Bolshoye Soldatskoye
- Kalinovka
- Manturovo
- Mazepovka

== See also ==
- Lists of rural localities in Russia
