= Umskiye Dvory =

Rural locality in Kursk Oblast, Russia

Umskiye Dvory Умские Дворы
- Village
- Interactive map of Umskiye Dvory
- Location of Umskiye Dvory Umskiye Dvory (Kursk Oblast)
- Coordinates: 52°00′07″N 35°55′29″E
- Country: Russia
- Federal subject: Kursk Oblast
- Administrative district: Fatezhsky District
- SelsovietSelsoviet: Verkhnekhotemlsky

Population (2010 Census)
  - Total: 50
  - Estimate (2010): 50 (0%)

Municipal status
  - Municipal district: Fatezhsky Municipal District
  - Rural settlement: Verkhnekhotemlsky Selsoviet Rural Settlement
- Time zone: UTC+3 (MSK)
- Postal code: 307115
- Dialing code: +7 47144
- OKTMO ID: 38644420171
- Website: моверхнехотемльский.рф

Umskiye Dvory (Russian: Умские Дворы) is a rural locality (Russian: деревня, lit. 'village') in Verkhnekhotemlsky Selsoviet Rural Settlement, Fatezhsky District, Kursk Oblast, Russia. Population: 50 (2010 census); 67 (2002 census);

== Geography ==
The village is located on the Umsky Brook in the basin of the Svapa, 102 km from the Russia–Ukraine border, 34 km north-west of Kursk, 10 km south-east of the district center – the town Fatezh, 3 km from the selsoviet center – Verkhny Khoteml.

Climate

Umskiye Dvory has a warm-summer humid continental climate (Dfb in the Köppen climate classification).

== Transport ==
Umskiye Dvory is located on the federal route M-2 Crimea Highway as part of the European route E105, 25 km from the road of regional importance 38K-018 (Kursk – Ponyri), 3 km from the road 38K-039 (Fatezh – 38K-018), 1.5 km from the road of intermunicipal significance 38H-783 (M2 "Crimea Highway" – Kosilovo, with the access road to Dobrokhotovo), 29 km from the nearest railway halt 521 km (railway line Oryol – Kursk).

The rural locality is situated 36.5 km from Kursk Vostochny Airport, 156 km from Belgorod International Airport and 228 km from Voronezh Peter the Great Airport.
