= Minovka, Kursk Oblast =

Rural locality in Kursk Oblast, Russia

Minovka Миновка
- Village
- Interactive map of Minovka
- Location of Minovka Minovka (Kursk Oblast)
- Coordinates: 52°02′46″N 35°56′05″E
- Country: Russia
- Federal subject: Kursk Oblast
- Administrative district: Fatezhsky District
- SelsovietSelsoviet: Mileninsky

Population (2010 Census)
  - Total: 40
  - Estimate (2010): 40 (0%)

Municipal status
  - Municipal district: Fatezhsky Municipal District
  - Rural settlement: Mileninsky Selsoviet Rural Settlement
- Time zone: UTC+3 (MSK)
- Postal code: 307107
- Dialing code: +7 47144
- OKTMO ID: 38644444121
- Website: момиленинский.рф

Minovka (Russian: Миновка) is a rural locality (Russian: деревня, lit. 'village') in Mileninsky Selsoviet Rural Settlement, Fatezhsky District, Kursk Oblast, Russia. The population as of 2010 is 40.

== Geography ==
The village is located in the Usozha River basin (a left tributary of the Svapa in the basin of the Seym), 107 km from the Russia–Ukraine border, 38 km north-west of Kursk, 6 km south-east of the district center – the town Fatezh, 5 km from the selsoviet center – Milenino.

=== Climate ===
Minovka has a warm-summer humid continental climate (Dfb in the Köppen climate classification).

== Transport ==
Minovka is located 3 km from the federal route M-2 Crimea Highway as part of the European route E105, 24 km from the road of regional importance 38K-018 (Kursk – Ponyri), 1.5 km from the road 38K-039 (Fatezh – 38K-018), 4 km from the road of intermunicipal significance 38H-210 (M2 "Crimea Highway" – Zykovka – Maloye Annenkovo – 38K-039), 27.5 km from the nearest railway halt 487 km (railway line Oryol – Kursk).

The rural locality is situated 40 km from Kursk Vostochny Airport, 161 km from Belgorod International Airport and 228 km from Voronezh Peter the Great Airport.
