= Atorinka =

Rural locality in Kursk Oblast, Russia

Atorinka Аторинка
- Village
- Interactive map of Atorinka
- Location of Atorinka Atorinka (Kursk Oblast)
- Coordinates: 52°04′47″N 35°53′16″E
- Country: Russia
- Federal subject: Kursk Oblast
- Administrative district: Fatezhsky District
- SelsovietSelsoviet: Mileninsky

Population (2010 Census)
  - Total: 81
  - Estimate (2010): 81 (0%)

Municipal status
  - Municipal district: Fatezhsky Municipal District
  - Rural settlement: Mileninsky Selsoviet Rural Settlement
- Time zone: UTC+3 (MSK)
- Postal code: 307107
- Dialing code: +7 47144
- OKTMO ID: 38644444106
- Website: момиленинский.рф

Atorinka (Russian: Аторинка) is a rural locality (Russian: деревня, lit. 'village') in Mileninsky Selsoviet Rural Settlement, Fatezhsky District, Kursk Oblast, Russia. Population: 81 (2010 census); 79 (2002 census);

== Geography ==
The village is located on the Usozha River (a left tributary of the Svapa in the basin of the Seym), 105 km from the Russia–Ukraine border, 43 km north-west of Kursk, 1.5 km south-east of the district center – the town Fatezh, 1 km from the selsoviet center – Milenino.

Climate

Atorinka has a warm-summer humid continental climate (Dfb in the Köppen climate classification).

== Transport ==
Atorinka is located 2 km from the federal route M-2 Crimea Highway as part of the European route E105, 27.5 km from the road of regional importance 38K-018 (Kursk – Ponyri), 3 km from the road 38K-039 (Fatezh – 38K-018), 0.6 km from the road of intermunicipal significance 38H-210 (M2 "Crimea Highway" – Zykovka – Maloye Annenkovo – 38K-039), 29 km from the nearest railway station Vozy (railway line Oryol – Kursk).

The rural locality is situated 45 km from Kursk Vostochny Airport, 165 km from Belgorod International Airport and 231 km from Voronezh Peter the Great Airport.
