= Yakovlevsky (rural locality) =

Yakovlevsky (Russian: Я́ковлевский; masculine), Yakovlevskaya (Я́ковлевская; feminine), or Yakovlevskoye (Я́ковлевское; neuter) is the name of several rural localities in Russia.

== Arkhangelsk Oblast ==
As of 2010, four rural localities in Arkhangelsk Oblast bear this name:

- Yakovlevskaya, Andreyevsky Selsoviet, Nyandomsky District, Arkhangelsk Oblast, a village in Andreyevsky Selsoviet of Nyandomsky District
- Yakovlevskaya, Lepshinsky Selsoviet, Nyandomsky District, Arkhangelsk Oblast, a village in Lepshinsky Selsoviet of Nyandomsky District
- Yakovlevskaya, Shenkursky District, Arkhangelsk Oblast, a village in Shegovarsky Selsoviet of Shenkursky District
- Yakovlevskaya, Vinogradovsky District, Arkhangelsk Oblast, a village in Zaostrovsky Selsoviet of Vinogradovsky District

== Ivanovo Oblast ==
As of 2010, two rural localities in Ivanovo Oblast bear this name:

- Yakovlevskoye, Furmanovsky District, Ivanovo Oblast, a village in Furmanovsky District
- Yakovlevskoye, Ilyinsky District, Ivanovo Oblast, a village in Ilyinsky District

== Kaluga Oblast ==
As of 2010, one rural locality in Kaluga Oblast bears this name:

- Yakovlevskaya, Kaluga Oblast, a village in Baryatinsky District

== Kirov Oblast ==
As of 2010, one rural locality in Kirov Oblast bears this name:

- Yakovlevskaya, Kirov Oblast, a village in Ichetovkinsky Rural Okrug of Afanasyevsky District

== Komi Republic ==
As of 2010, one rural locality in the Komi Republic bears this name:

- Yakovlevskaya, Komi Republic, a village in Noshul Selo Administrative Territory of Priluzsky District

== Kostroma Oblast ==
As of 2010, two rural localities in Kostroma Oblast bear this name:

- Yakovlevskoye, Buysky District, Kostroma Oblast, a village in Tsentralnoye Settlement of Buysky District
- Yakovlevskoye, Kostromskoy District, Kostroma Oblast, a selo in Shungenskoye Settlement of Kostromskoy District

== Kursk Oblast ==
As of 2010, one rural locality in Kursk Oblast bears this name:

- Yakovlevsky, Kursk Oblast, a khutor in Verkhnekhotemlsky Selsoviet of Fatezhsky District

== Moscow Oblast ==
As of 2010, four rural localities in Moscow Oblast bear this name:

- Yakovlevskoye, Domodedovo, Moscow Oblast, a village under the administrative jurisdiction of the Domodedovo City Under Oblast Jurisdiction
- Yakovlevskoye, Naro-Fominsky District, Moscow Oblast, a village in Novofedorovskoye Rural Settlement of Naro-Fominsky District
- Yakovlevskoye, Serebryano-Prudsky District, Moscow Oblast, a village in Uzunovskoye Rural Settlement of Serebryano-Prudsky District
- Yakovlevskaya, Moscow Oblast, a village in Davydovskoye Rural Settlement of Orekhovo-Zuyevsky District

== Pskov Oblast ==
As of 2010, one rural locality in Pskov Oblast bears this name:

- Yakovlevskoye, Pskov Oblast, a village in Novorzhevsky District

== Tula Oblast ==
As of 2010, one rural locality in Tula Oblast bears this name:

- Yakovlevsky, Tula Oblast, a settlement in Malakhovsky Rural Okrug of Zaoksky District

== Tver Oblast ==
As of 2010, four rural localities in Tver Oblast bear this name:

- Yakovlevskoye, Kimrsky District, Tver Oblast, a village in Kimrsky District
- Yakovlevskoye, Molokovsky District, Tver Oblast, a village in Molokovsky District
- Yakovlevskoye, Torzhoksky District, Tver Oblast, a village in Torzhoksky District
- Yakovlevskoye, Zapadnodvinsky District, Tver Oblast, a village in Zapadnodvinsky District

== Vologda Oblast ==
As of 2010, four rural localities in Vologda Oblast bear this name:

- Yakovlevskoye, Ustyuzhensky District, Vologda Oblast, a village in Persky Selsoviet of Ustyuzhensky District
- Yakovlevskoye, Vologodsky District, Vologda Oblast, a village in Semenkovsky Selsoviet of Vologodsky District
- Yakovlevskaya, Babayevsky District, Vologda Oblast, a village in Pyazhozersky Selsoviet of Babayevsky District
- Yakovlevskaya, Syamzhensky District, Vologda Oblast, a village in Zhityevsky Selsoviet of Syamzhensky District

== Yaroslavl Oblast ==
As of 2010, seven rural localities in Yaroslavl Oblast bear this name:

- Yakovlevskoye, Breytovsky District, Yaroslavl Oblast, a village in Pokrovo-Sitsky Rural Okrug of Breytovsky District
- Yakovlevskoye, Gavrilov-Yamsky District, Yaroslavl Oblast, a village in Ilyinsky Rural Okrug of Gavrilov-Yamsky District
- Yakovlevskoye, Lyubimsky District, Yaroslavl Oblast, a village in Osetsky Rural Okrug of Lyubimsky District
- Yakovlevskoye, Kladovsky Rural Okrug, Poshekhonsky District, Yaroslavl Oblast, a village in Kladovsky Rural Okrug of Poshekhonsky District
- Yakovlevskoye, Leninsky Rural Okrug, Poshekhonsky District, Yaroslavl Oblast, a village in Leninsky Rural Okrug of Poshekhonsky District
- Yakovlevskoye, Ninorovsky Rural Okrug, Uglichsky District, Yaroslavl Oblast, a village in Ninorovsky Rural Okrug of Uglichsky District
- Yakovlevskoye, Slobodskoy Rural Okrug, Uglichsky District, Yaroslavl Oblast, a village in Slobodskoy Rural Okrug of Uglichsky District
