= Gayevo, Kursk Oblast =

Rural locality in Kursk Oblast, Russia

Gayevo Гаево
- Selo
- Interactive map of Gayevo
- Location of Gayevo Gayevo (Kursk Oblast)
- Coordinates: 52°09′34″N 35°44′35″E
- Country: Russia
- Federal subject: Kursk Oblast
- Administrative district: Fatezhsky District
- SelsovietSelsoviet: Rusanovsky

Population (2010 Census)
  - Total: 86
  - Estimate (2010): 86 (0%)

Municipal status
  - Municipal district: Fatezhsky Municipal District
  - Rural settlement: Rusanovsky Selsoviet Rural Settlement
- Time zone: UTC+3 (MSK)
- Postal code: 307121
- Dialing code: +7 47144
- OKTMO ID: 38644464186
- Website: морусановский.рф

Gayevo (Russian: Гаево) is a rural locality (a selo) in Rusanovsky Selsoviet Rural Settlement, Fatezhsky District, Kursk Oblast, Russia. Population: 86 (2010 census); 116 (2002 census);

== History ==
The locality came under the control of the Armed Forces of Ukraine in August 2024 following an incursion into Kursk Oblast by Ukrainian forces during the Russian invasion of Ukraine.

== Geography ==
The village is located on the Reut River (a left tributary of the Zhelen in the basin of the Svapa), 98 km from the Russia–Ukraine border, 56 km north-west of Kursk, 10.5 km north-west of the district center – the town Fatezh, 10 km from the selsoviet center – Basovka.

Climate

Gayevo has a warm-summer humid continental climate (Dfb in the Köppen climate classification).

== Transport ==
Gayevo is located 7 km from the federal route M-2 Crimea Highway as part of the European route E105, 5 km from the road of regional importance 38K-038 (Fatezh – Dmitriyev), on the road of intermunicipal significance 38H-675 (38K-038 – Nizhny Reut – Putchino), 23 km from the nearest railway halt 34 km (railway line Arbuzovo – Luzhki-Orlovskiye).

The rural locality is situated 58 km from Kursk Vostochny Airport, 177 km from Belgorod International Airport and 242 km from Voronezh Peter the Great Airport.
