= Fyodorovka, Fatezhsky District, Kursk Oblast =

Rural locality in Kursk Oblast, Russia

Fyodorovka Фёдоровка
- Village
- Interactive map of Fyodorovka
- Location of Fyodorovka Fyodorovka (Kursk Oblast)
- Coordinates: 52°02′13″N 35°50′36″E
- Country: Russia
- Federal subject: Kursk Oblast
- Administrative district: Fatezhsky District
- SelsovietSelsoviet: Verkhnekhotemlsky

Population (2010 Census)
  - Total: 13
  - Estimate (2010): 13 (0%)

Municipal status
  - Municipal district: Fatezhsky Municipal District
  - Rural settlement: Verkhnekhotemlsky Selsoviet Rural Settlement
- Time zone: UTC+3 (MSK)
- Postal code: 307110
- Dialing code: +7 47144
- OKTMO ID: 38644420176
- Website: моверхнехотемльский.рф

Fyodorovka (Russian: Фёдоровка) is a rural locality (Russian: деревня, lit. 'village') in Verkhnekhotemlsky Selsoviet Rural Settlement, Fatezhsky District, Kursk Oblast, Russia. Population: 13 (2010 census); 34 (2002 census);

== Geography ==
The village is located on the Verkhny Khoteml Brook (a link tributary of the Usozha in the basin of the Svapa), 101 km from the Russia–Ukraine border, 41 km north-west of Kursk, 5.5 km south-west of the district center – the town Fatezh, 4 km from the selsoviet center – Verkhny Khoteml.

Climate

Fyodorovka has a warm-summer humid continental climate (Dfb in the Köppen climate classification).

== Transport ==
Fyodorovka is located 3.5 km from the federal route M-2 Crimea Highway as part of the European route E105, 30 km from the road of regional importance 38K-018 (Kursk – Ponyri), 3.5 km from the road 38K-039 (Fatezh – 38K-018), 1.5 km from the road of intermunicipal significance 38H-224 (M2 "Crimea Highway" – Mirolyubovo), 34 km from the nearest railway station Vozy (railway line Oryol – Kursk).

The rural locality is situated 43.5 km from Kursk Vostochny Airport, 161 km from Belgorod International Airport and 234 km from Voronezh Peter the Great Airport.
