= Malinov, Russia =

Rural locality in Kursk Oblast, Russia

Malinov Малинов
- Khutor
- Interactive map of Malinov
- Location of Malinov Malinov (Kursk Oblast)
- Coordinates: 52°03′17″N 36°03′32″E
- Country: Russia
- Federal subject: Kursk Oblast
- Administrative district: Fatezhsky District
- SelsovietSelsoviet: Glebovsky

Population (2010 Census)
  - Total: 17
  - Estimate (2010): 17 (0%)

Municipal status
  - Municipal district: Fatezhsky Municipal District
  - Rural settlement: Glebovsky Selsoviet Rural Settlement
- Time zone: UTC+3 (MSK)
- Postal code: 307127
- Dialing code: +7 47144
- OKTMO ID: 38644424131
- Website: моглебовский.рф

Malinov (Russian: Малинов) is a rural locality (a khutor) in Glebovsky Selsoviet Rural Settlement, Fatezhsky District, Kursk Oblast, Russia. The population as of 2010 is 17.

== Geography ==
The khutor is located in the Usozha River basin (a left tributary of the Svapa in the basin of the Seym), 112 km from the Russia–Ukraine border, 35 km north-west of Kursk, 13 km south-east of the district center – the town Fatezh, 6 km from the selsoviet center – Zykovka.

=== Climate ===
Malinov has a warm-summer humid continental climate (Dfb in the Köppen climate classification).

== Transport ==
Malinov is located 11.5 km from the federal route M-2 Crimea Highway as part of the European route E105, 15.5 km from the road of regional importance 38K-018 (Kursk – Ponyri), 2.5 km from the road 38K-039 (Fatezh – 38K-018), 5 km from the road of intermunicipal significance 38H-210 (M2 "Crimea Highway" – Zykovka – Maloye Annenkovo – 38K-039), 19.5 km from the nearest railway halt 487 km (railway line Oryol – Kursk).

The rural locality is situated 36.5 km from Kursk Vostochny Airport, 159 km from Belgorod International Airport and 219 km from Voronezh Peter the Great Airport.
