= Shmarnoye, Glebovsky selsovet, Fatezhsky District, Kursk Oblast =

Rural locality in Kursk Oblast, Russia

Shmarnoye Шмарное
- Village
- Interactive map of Shmarnoye
- Location of Shmarnoye Shmarnoye (Kursk Oblast)
- Coordinates: 52°05′16″N 35°59′15″E
- Country: Russia
- Federal subject: Kursk Oblast
- Administrative district: Fatezhsky District
- SelsovietSelsoviet: Glebovsky

Population (2010 Census)
  - Total: 132
  - Estimate (2010): 132 (0%)

Municipal status
  - Municipal district: Fatezhsky Municipal District
  - Rural settlement: Glebovsky Selsoviet Rural Settlement
- Time zone: UTC+3 (MSK)
- Postal code: 307127
- Dialing code: +7 47144
- OKTMO ID: 38644424171
- Website: моглебовский.рф

Shmarnoye (Russian: Шмарное) is a rural locality (Russian: деревня, lit. 'village') in Glebovsky Selsoviet Rural Settlement, Fatezhsky District, Kursk Oblast, Russia. Population: 132 (2010 census); 139 (2002 census);

== Geography ==
The village is located on the Shmarny Brook (a link tributary of the Usozha in the basin of the Svapa), 112 km from the Russia–Ukraine border, 41 km north-west of Kursk, 8 km east of the district center – the town Fatezh, 0.3 km from the selsoviet center – Zykovka.

Climate

Shmarnoye has a warm-summer humid continental climate (Dfb in the Köppen climate classification).

== Transport ==
Shmarnoye is located 8 km from the federal route M-2 Crimea Highway as part of the European route E105, 21 km from the road of regional importance 38K-018 (Kursk – Ponyri), 7.5 km from the road 38K-039 (Fatezh – 38K-018), on the road of intermunicipal significance 38H-210 (M2 "Crimea Highway" – Zykovka – Maloye Annenkovo – 38K-039), 22.5 km from the nearest railway halt 487 km (railway line Oryol – Kursk).

The rural locality is situated 42 km from Kursk Vostochny Airport, 164 km from Belgorod International Airport and 224 km from Voronezh Peter the Great Airport.
