= Plota, Fatezhsky District, Kursk Oblast =

Rural locality in Kursk Oblast, Russia

Plota Плота
- Khutor
- Interactive map of Plota
- Location of Plota Plota (Kursk Oblast)
- Coordinates: 52°09′28″N 35°45′30″E
- Country: Russia
- Federal subject: Kursk Oblast
- Administrative district: Fatezhsky District
- SelsovietSelsoviet: Rusanovsky

Population (2010 Census)
  - Total: 17
  - Estimate (2010): 17 (0%)

Municipal status
  - Municipal district: Fatezhsky Municipal District
  - Rural settlement: Rusanovsky Selsoviet Rural Settlement
- Time zone: UTC+3 (MSK)
- Postal code: 307126
- Dialing code: +7 47144
- OKTMO ID: 38644464191
- Website: морусановский.рф

Plota (Russian: Плота) is a rural locality (a khutor) in Rusanovsky Selsoviet Rural Settlement, Fatezhsky District, Kursk Oblast, Russia. The population as of 2010 is 17.

== Geography ==
The khutor is located on the Plota Brook (a right tributary of the Reut in the basin of the Svapa), 99.5 km from the Russia–Ukraine border, 55 km north-west of Kursk, 10 km north-west of the district center – the town Fatezh, 9.5 km from the selsoviet center – Basovka.

=== Climate ===
Plota has a warm-summer humid continental climate (Dfb in the Köppen climate classification).

== Transport ==
Plota is located 5.5 km from the federal route M-2 Crimea Highway as part of the European route E105, 5 km from the road of regional importance 38K-038 (Fatezh – Dmitriyev), 1 km from the road of intermunicipal significance 38H-675 (38K-038 – Nizhny Reut – Putchino), 24 km from the nearest railway halt 34 km (railway line Arbuzovo – Luzhki-Orlovskiye).

The rural locality is situated 57 km from Kursk Vostochny Airport, 177 km from Belgorod International Airport and 241 km from Voronezh Peter the Great Airport.
