= Lunevka, Fatezhsky District, Kursk Oblast =

Rural locality in Kursk Oblast, Russia

Lunevka Луневка
- Village
- Interactive map of Lunevka
- Location of Lunevka Lunevka (Kursk Oblast)
- Coordinates: 52°05′25″N 35°58′14″E
- Country: Russia
- Federal subject: Kursk Oblast
- Administrative district: Fatezhsky District
- SelsovietSelsoviet: Glebovsky

Population (2010 Census)
  - Total: 127
  - Estimate (2010): 127 (0%)

Municipal status
  - Municipal district: Fatezhsky Municipal District
  - Rural settlement: Glebovsky Selsoviet Rural Settlement
- Time zone: UTC+3 (MSK)
- Postal code: 307127
- Dialing code: +7 47144
- OKTMO ID: 38644424126
- Website: моглебовский.рф

Lunevka (Russian: Луневка) is a rural locality (Russian: деревня, lit. 'village') in Glebovsky Selsoviet Rural Settlement, Fatezhsky District, Kursk Oblast, Russia. The population as of 2010 is 127.

== Geography ==
The village is located on the Usozha River (a left tributary of the Svapa in the basin of the Seym), 111 km from the Russia–Ukraine border, 42 km north-west of Kursk, 6 km east of the district center – the town Fatezh, 1 km from the selsoviet center – Zykovka.

=== Climate ===
Lunevka has a warm-summer humid continental climate (Dfb in the Köppen climate classification).

== Transport ==
Lunevka is located 7 km from the federal route M-2 Crimea Highway as part of the European route E105, 22 km from the road of regional importance 38K-018 (Kursk – Ponyri), 7 km from the road 38K-039 (Fatezh – 38K-018), on the road of intermunicipal significance 38H-210 (M2 "Crimea Highway" – Zykovka – Maloye Annenkovo – 38K-039), 23.5 km from the nearest railway station Vozy (railway line Oryol – Kursk).

The rural locality is situated 43 km from Kursk Vostochny Airport, 165 km from Belgorod International Airport and 226 km from Voronezh Peter the Great Airport.
