= Bolshoye Annenkovo =

Rural locality in Kursk Oblast, Russia

Bolshoye Annenkovo Большое Анненково
- Village
- Interactive map of Bolshoye Annenkovo
- Location of Bolshoye Annenkovo Bolshoye Annenkovo (Kursk Oblast)
- Coordinates: 52°07′31″N 36°03′59″E
- Country: Russia
- Federal subject: Kursk Oblast
- Administrative district: Fatezhsky District
- SelsovietSelsoviet: Bolsheannenkovsky

Population (2010 Census)
  - Total: 196
  - Estimate (2010): 196 (0%)

Administrative status
  - Capital of: Bolsheannenkovsky Selsoviet

Municipal status
  - Municipal district: Fatezhsky Municipal District
  - Rural settlement: Bolsheannenkovsky Selsoviet Rural Settlement
  - Capital of: Bolsheannenkovsky Selsoviet Rural Settlement
- Time zone: UTC+3 (MSK)
- Postal code: 307126
- Dialing code: +7 47144
- OKTMO ID: 38644408101
- Website: мобольшеанненковский.рф

Bolshoye Annenkovo (Russian: Большое Анненково) is a rural locality (Russian: деревня, lit. 'village') and the administrative center of Bolsheannenkovsky Selsoviet Rural Settlement, Fatezhsky District, Kursk Oblast, Russia. Population: 196 (2010 census); 207 (2002 census);

== Geography ==
The village is located on the Usozha River (a left tributary of the Svapa in the basin of the Seym), 118 km from the Russia–Ukraine border, 43 km north-west of Kursk, 13.5 km north-east of the district center – the town Fatezh.

Climate

Bolshoye Annenkovo has a warm-summer humid continental climate (Dfb in the Köppen climate classification).

Climate data for Bolshoye Annenkovo
Month	Jan	Feb	Mar	Apr	May	Jun	Jul	Aug	Sep	Oct	Nov	Dec	Year
Mean daily maximum °C (°F)	−4.5 (23.9)	−3.7 (25.3)	2 (36)	12.5 (54.5)	18.9 (66.0)	22.2 (72.0)	24.9 (76.8)	24.1 (75.4)	17.7 (63.9)	10.1 (50.2)	2.9 (37.2)	−1.6 (29.1)	10.5 (50.9)
Daily mean °C (°F)	−6.6 (20.1)	−6.1 (21.0)	−1.4 (29.5)	7.7 (45.9)	14.3 (57.7)	17.9 (64.2)	20.6 (69.1)	19.6 (67.3)	13.6 (56.5)	6.9 (44.4)	0.8 (33.4)	−3.5 (25.7)	7.0 (44.6)
Mean daily minimum °C (°F)	−9.1 (15.6)	−9.1 (15.6)	−5.3 (22.5)	2.2 (36.0)	8.7 (47.7)	12.6 (54.7)	15.5 (59.9)	14.5 (58.1)	9.4 (48.9)	3.6 (38.5)	−1.5 (29.3)	−5.7 (21.7)	3.0 (37.4)
Average precipitation mm (inches)	52 (2.0)	45 (1.8)	46 (1.8)	51 (2.0)	62 (2.4)	75 (3.0)	79 (3.1)	59 (2.3)	62 (2.4)	60 (2.4)	48 (1.9)	50 (2.0)	689 (27.1)
Source: https://en.climate-data.org/asia/russian-federation/kursk-oblast/большое-анненково-687064/

== Transport ==
Bolshoye Annenkovo is located 14.5 km from the federal route M-2 Crimea Highway as part of the European route E105, 17 km from the road of regional importance 38K-018 (Kursk – Ponyri), 7 km from the road 38K-039 (Fatezh – 38K-018), on the road of intermunicipal significance 38H-210 (M2 "Crimea Highway" – Zykovka – Maloye Annenkovo – 38K-039), 15.5 km from the nearest railway station Vozy (railway line Oryol – Kursk).

The rural locality is situated 43 km from Kursk Vostochny Airport, 167 km from Belgorod International Airport and 220 km from Voronezh Peter the Great Airport.
