= Grachevka, Fatezhsky District, Kursk Oblast =

Rural locality in Kursk Oblast, Russia

Grachevka Грачевка
- Village
- Interactive map of Grachevka
- Location of Grachevka Grachevka (Kursk Oblast)
- Coordinates: 52°05′46″N 35°58′05″E
- Country: Russia
- Federal subject: Kursk Oblast
- Administrative district: Fatezhsky District
- SelsovietSelsoviet: Glebovsky

Population (2010 Census)
  - Total: 42
  - Estimate (2010): 42 (0%)

Municipal status
  - Municipal district: Fatezhsky Municipal District
  - Rural settlement: Glebovsky Selsoviet Rural Settlement
- Time zone: UTC+3 (MSK)
- Postal code: 307127
- Dialing code: +7 47144
- OKTMO ID: 38644424116
- Website: моглебовский.рф

Grachevka (Russian: Грачевка) is a rural locality (Russian: деревня, lit. 'village') in Glebovsky Selsoviet Rural Settlement, Fatezhsky District, Kursk Oblast, Russia. Population: 42 (2010 census); 67 (2002 census);

== Geography ==
The village is located on the Usozha River (a left tributary of the Svapa in the basin of the Seym), 111 km from the Russia–Ukraine border, 43 km north-west of Kursk, 7 km east of the district center – the town Fatezh, 1.5 km from the selsoviet center – Zykovka.

Climate

Grachevka has a warm-summer humid continental climate (Dfb in the Köppen climate classification).

== Transport ==
Grachevka is located 7 km from the federal route M-2 Crimea Highway as part of the European route E105, 22.5 km from the road of regional importance 38K-018 (Kursk – Ponyri), 7.5 km from the road 38K-039 (Fatezh – 38K-018), 0.6 km from the road of intermunicipal significance 38H-210 (M2 "Crimea Highway" – Zykovka – Maloye Annenkovo – 38K-039), 23.5 km from the nearest railway station Vozy (railway line Oryol – Kursk).

The rural locality is situated 43.5 km from Kursk Vostochny Airport, 166 km from Belgorod International Airport and 226 km from Voronezh Peter the Great Airport.
