= Vesyoly, Verkhnekhotemlsky selsovet, Fatezhsky District, Kursk Oblast =

Rural locality in Kursk Oblast, Russia

Vesyoly Весёлый
- Khutor
- Interactive map of Vesyoly
- Location of Vesyoly Vesyoly (Kursk Oblast)
- Coordinates: 52°01′28″N 35°51′29″E
- Country: Russia
- Federal subject: Kursk Oblast
- Administrative district: Fatezhsky District
- SelsovietSelsoviet: Verkhnekhotemlsky

Population (2010 Census)
  - Total: 7
  - Estimate (2010): 7 (0%)

Municipal status
  - Municipal district: Fatezhsky Municipal District
  - Rural settlement: Verkhnekhotemlsky Selsoviet Rural Settlement
- Time zone: UTC+3 (MSK)
- Postal code: 307115
- Dialing code: +7 47144
- OKTMO ID: 38644420106
- Website: моверхнехотемльский.рф

Vesyoly (Russian: Весёлый) is a rural locality (a khutor) in Verkhnekhotemlsky Selsoviet Rural Settlement, Fatezhsky District, Kursk Oblast, Russia. Population: 7 (2010 census); 17 (2002 census);

== Geography ==
The khutor is located on the Verkhny Khoteml Brook (a link tributary of the Usozha in the basin of the Svapa), 102 km from the Russia–Ukraine border, 39 km north-west of Kursk, 7 km south-west of the district center – the town Fatezh, 2.5 km from the selsoviet center – Verkhny Khoteml.

Climate

Vesyoly has a warm-summer humid continental climate (Dfb in the Köppen climate classification).

== Transport ==
Vesyoly is located 3 km from the federal route M-2 Crimea Highway as part of the European route E105, 29.5 km from the road of regional importance 38K-018 (Kursk – Ponyri), 3.5 km from the road 38K-039 (Fatezh – 38K-018), 2 km from the road of intermunicipal significance 38H-181 (M2 "Crimea Highway" – Verkhny Khoteml), 34 km from the nearest railway station Vozy (railway line Oryol – Kursk).

The rural locality is situated 41.5 km from Kursk Vostochny Airport, 160 km from Belgorod International Airport and 233 km from Voronezh Peter the Great Airport.
