= Larinskiye Vyselki =

Rural locality in Kursk Oblast, Russia

Larinskiye Vyselki Ларинские Выселки
- Khutor
- Interactive map of Larinskiye Vyselki
- Location of Larinskiye Vyselki Larinskiye Vyselki (Kursk Oblast)
- Coordinates: 52°00′54″N 35°51′26″E
- Country: Russia
- Federal subject: Kursk Oblast
- Administrative district: Fatezhsky District
- SelsovietSelsoviet: Verkhnekhotemlsky

Population (2010 Census)
  - Total: 11
  - Estimate (2010): 11 (0%)

Municipal status
  - Municipal district: Fatezhsky Municipal District
  - Rural settlement: Verkhnekhotemlsky Selsoviet Rural Settlement
- Time zone: UTC+3 (MSK)
- Postal code: 307115
- Dialing code: +7 47144
- OKTMO ID: 38644420131
- Website: моверхнехотемльский.рф

Larinskiye Vyselki (Russian: Ларинские Выселки) is a rural locality (a khutor) in Verkhnekhotemlsky Selsoviet Rural Settlement, Fatezhsky District, Kursk Oblast, Russia. Population: 11 (2010 census); 31 (2002 census);

== Geography ==
The khutor is located on the Verkhny Khoteml Brook (a link tributary of the Usozha in the basin of the Svapa), 101 km from the Russia–Ukraine border, 38 km north-west of Kursk, 8 km south of the district center – the town Fatezh, 2 km from the selsoviet center – Verkhny Khoteml.

Climate

Larinskiye Vyselki has a warm-summer humid continental climate (Dfb in the Köppen climate classification).

== Transport ==
Larinskiye Vyselki is located 3 km from the federal route M-2 Crimea Highway as part of the European route E105, 8.5 km from the road of regional importance 38K-038 (Fatezh – Dmitriyev), 29.5 km from the road 38K-018 (Kursk – Ponyri), 4.5 km from the road 38K-039 (Fatezh – 38K-018), 1.5 km from the road of intermunicipal significance 38H-181 (M2 "Crimea Highway" – Verkhny Khoteml), 34 km from the nearest railway halt 521 km (railway line Oryol – Kursk).

The rural locality is situated 41 km from Kursk Vostochny Airport, 159 km from Belgorod International Airport and 233 km from Voronezh Peter the Great Airport.
