= Novyye Dvory, Kursk Oblast =

Rural locality in Kursk Oblast, Russia

Novyye Dvory Новые Дворы
- Village
- Interactive map of Novyye Dvory
- Location of Novyye Dvory Novyye Dvory (Kursk Oblast)
- Coordinates: 52°04′32″N 35°52′14″E
- Country: Russia
- Federal subject: Kursk Oblast
- Administrative district: Fatezhsky District
- SelsovietSelsoviet: Rusanovsky

Population (2010 Census)
  - Total: 141
  - Estimate (2010): 141 (0%)

Municipal status
  - Municipal district: Fatezhsky Municipal District
  - Rural settlement: Rusanovsky Selsoviet Rural Settlement
- Time zone: UTC+3 (MSK)
- Postal code: 307119
- Dialing code: +7 47144
- OKTMO ID: 38644464141
- Website: морусановский.рф

Novyye Dvory (Russian: Новые Дворы) is a rural locality (Russian: деревня, lit. 'village') in Rusanovsky Selsoviet Rural Settlement, Fatezhsky District, Kursk Oblast, Russia. The population as of 2010 is 141.

== Geography ==
The village is located on the Usozha River (a left tributary of the Svapa in the basin of the Seym), 103 km from the Russia–Ukraine border, 43 km north-west of Kursk, 1 km south of the district center – the town Fatezh, 3 km from the selsoviet center – Basovka.

=== Climate ===
Novyye Dvory has a warm-summer humid continental climate (Dfb in the Köppen climate classification).

== Transport ==
Novyye Dvory is located 1 km from the federal route M-2 Crimea Highway as part of the European route E105, 2 km from the road of regional importance 38K-038 (Fatezh – Dmitriyev), on the road of intermunicipal significance 38H-255 (M2 "Crimea Highway" – Chibisovka), 30 km from the nearest railway station Vozy (railway line Oryol – Kursk).

The rural locality is situated 45 km from Kursk Vostochny Airport, 165 km from Belgorod International Airport and 233 km from Voronezh Peter the Great Airport.
