= Peshchery, Kursk Oblast =

Rural locality in Kursk Oblast, Russia

Peshchery Пещеры
- Khutor
- Interactive map of Peshchery
- Location of Peshchery Peshchery (Kursk Oblast)
- Coordinates: 51°59′51″N 35°53′29″E
- Country: Russia
- Federal subject: Kursk Oblast
- Administrative district: Fatezhsky District
- SelsovietSelsoviet: Verkhnekhotemlsky

Population (2010 Census)
  - Total: 9
  - Estimate (2010): 9 (0%)

Municipal status
  - Municipal district: Fatezhsky Municipal District
  - Rural settlement: Verkhnekhotemlsky Selsoviet Rural Settlement
- Time zone: UTC+3 (MSK)
- Postal code: 307115
- Dialing code: +7 47144
- OKTMO ID: 38644420156
- Website: моверхнехотемльский.рф

Peshchery (Russian: Пещеры) is a rural locality (a khutor) in Verkhnekhotemlsky Selsoviet Rural Settlement, Fatezhsky District, Kursk Oblast, Russia. The population as of 2010 is 9.

== Geography ==
The khutor is located on the Umsky Brook in the basin of the Svapa, 101 km from the Russia–Ukraine border, 34.5 km north-west of Kursk, 10 km south of the district center – the town Fatezh, 1.5 km from the selsoviet center – Verkhny Khoteml.

=== Climate ===
Peshchery has a warm-summer humid continental climate (Dfb in the Köppen climate classification).

== Transport ==
Peshchery is located 1.5 km from the federal route M-2 Crimea Highway as part of the European route E105, 11 km from the road of regional importance 38K-038 (Fatezh – Dmitriyev), 27.5 km from the road 38K-018 (Kursk – Ponyri), 4.5 km from the road 38K-039 (Fatezh – 38K-018), 2 km from the road of intermunicipal significance 38H-181 (M2 "Crimea Highway" – Verkhny Khoteml), 31 km from the nearest railway halt 521 km (railway line Oryol – Kursk).

The rural locality is situated 38 km from Kursk Vostochny Airport, 157 km from Belgorod International Airport and 231 km from Voronezh Peter the Great Airport.
