= Polekhovka =

Rural locality in Kursk Oblast, Russia

Polekhovka Полеховка
- Village
- Interactive map of Polekhovka
- Location of Polekhovka Polekhovka (Kursk Oblast)
- Coordinates: 52°05′01″N 35°50′08″E
- Country: Russia
- Federal subject: Kursk Oblast
- Administrative district: Fatezhsky District
- SelsovietSelsoviet: Rusanovsky

Population (2010 Census)
  - Total: 46
  - Estimate (2010): 46 (0%)

Municipal status
  - Municipal district: Fatezhsky Municipal District
  - Rural settlement: Rusanovsky Selsoviet Rural Settlement
- Time zone: UTC+3 (MSK)
- Postal code: 307119
- Dialing code: +7 47144
- OKTMO ID: 38644464146
- Website: морусановский.рф

Polekhovka (Russian: Полеховка) is a rural locality (Russian: деревня, lit. 'village') in Rusanovsky Selsoviet Rural Settlement, Fatezhsky District, Kursk Oblast, Russia. The population as of 2010 is 46.

== Geography ==
The village is located on the Usozha River (a left tributary of the Svapa in the basin of the Seym), 102 km from the Russia–Ukraine border, 45 km north-west of Kursk, 1 km west of the district center – the town Fatezh, 0.5 km from the selsoviet center – Basovka.

=== Climate ===
Polekhovka has a warm-summer humid continental climate (Dfb in the Köppen climate classification).

== Transport ==
Polekhovka is located 1 km from the federal route M-2 Crimea Highway as part of the European route E105, 1.5 km from the road of regional importance 38K-038 (Fatezh – Dmitriyev), 0.5 km from the road of intermunicipal significance 38H-670 (38K-038 – Basovka), 33 km from the nearest railway halt 34 km (railway line Arbuzovo – Luzhki-Orlovskiye).

The rural locality is situated 48 km from Kursk Vostochny Airport, 167 km from Belgorod International Airport and 235 km from Voronezh Peter the Great Airport.
