= 2nd Rozhdestvenskoye =

Rural locality in Kursk Oblast, Russia

2nd Rozhdestvenskoye 2-е Рождественское
- Selo
- Interactive map of 2nd Rozhdestvenskoye
- Location of 2nd Rozhdestvenskoye 2nd Rozhdestvenskoye (Kursk Oblast)
- Coordinates: 52°01′14″N 35°51′11″E
- Country: Russia
- Federal subject: Kursk Oblast
- Administrative district: Fatezhsky District
- SelsovietSelsoviet: Verkhnekhotemlsky

Population (2010 Census)
  - Total: 26
  - Estimate (2010): 26 (0%)

Municipal status
  - Municipal district: Fatezhsky Municipal District
  - Rural settlement: Verkhnekhotemlsky Selsoviet Rural Settlement
- Time zone: UTC+3 (MSK)
- Postal code: 307115
- Dialing code: +7 47144
- OKTMO ID: 38644420166
- Website: моверхнехотемльский.рф

2nd Rozhdestvenskoye or Vtoroye Rozhdestvenskoye (Russian: 2-е Рождественское, Второе Рождественское) is a rural locality (Russian: село, lit. 'village') in Verkhnekhotemlsky Selsoviet Rural Settlement, Fatezhsky District, Kursk Oblast, Russia. Population: 26 (2010 census); 35 (2002 census);

== Geography ==
The village is located on the Gryazny Brook in the basin of the Svapa, 101 km from the Russia–Ukraine border, 38 km north-west of Kursk, 7 km (13 km by road) south of the district center – the town Fatezh, 2.5 km from the selsoviet center – Verkhny Khoteml. There are no streets with titles.

Climate

2nd Rozhdestvenskoye has a warm-summer humid continental climate (Dfb in the Köppen climate classification).

== Transport ==
2nd Rozhdestvenskoye is located 3.5 km from the federal route M-2 Crimea Highway as part of the European route E105, 30 km from the road of regional importance 38K-018 (Kursk – Ponyri), 4 km from the road 38K-039 (Fatezh – 38K-018), 2 km from the road of intermunicipal significance 38H-181 (M2 "Crimea Highway" – Verkhny Khoteml), 34.5 km from the nearest railway station Vozy (railway line Oryol – Kursk).

The rural locality is situated 42 km from Kursk Vostochny Airport, 160 km from Belgorod International Airport and 233 km from Voronezh Peter the Great Airport.
