= 1st Rozhdestvenskoye =

Rural locality in Kursk Oblast, Russia

1st Rozhdestvenskoye 1-е Рождественское
- Selo
- Interactive map of 1st Rozhdestvenskoye
- Location of 1st Rozhdestvenskoye 1st Rozhdestvenskoye (Kursk Oblast)
- Coordinates: 52°00′57″N 35°52′06″E
- Country: Russia
- Federal subject: Kursk Oblast
- Administrative district: Fatezhsky District
- SelsovietSelsoviet: Verkhnekhotemlsky

Population (2010 Census)
  - Total: 34
  - Estimate (2010): 34 (0%)

Municipal status
  - Municipal district: Fatezhsky Municipal District
  - Rural settlement: Verkhnekhotemlsky Selsoviet Rural Settlement
- Time zone: UTC+3 (MSK)
- Postal code: 307115
- Dialing code: +7 47144
- OKTMO ID: 38644420161
- Website: моверхнехотемльский.рф

1st Rozhdestvenskoye or Pervoye Rozhdestvenskoye (Russian: 1-е Рождественское, Первое Рождественское) is a rural locality (Russian: село, lit. 'village') in Verkhnekhotemlsky Selsoviet Rural Settlement, Fatezhsky District, Kursk Oblast, Russia. Population: 34 (2010 census); 55 (2002 census);

== Geography ==
The village is located on the right bank of the Verkhny Khoteml Brook (a link tributary of the Usozha in the basin of the Svapa), 101 km from the Russia–Ukraine border, 38 km north-west of Kursk, 7.5 km (10 km by road) south of the district center – the town Fatezh, 1 km from the selsoviet center – Verkhny Khoteml.

=== Climate ===
1st Rozhdestvenskoye has a warm-summer humid continental climate (Dfb in the Köppen climate classification).

== History ==
During the Great Patriotic War, a hospital was organized inside the village school. In 1965, the village of Dolgintsevo was added to the village.

== Famous people ==
- Yevgeny Samodurov (born in 1st Rojdenstvenskoe in 1925), a Red Army radio operator who was awarded the Order of Glory for his actions on the Ukrainian Front during World War II.

== Transport ==
1st Rozhdestvenskoye is located 2.5 km from the federal route M-2 Crimea Highway as part of the European route E105, 29 km from the road of regional importance 38K-018 (Kursk – Ponyri), 4 km from the road 38K-039 (Fatezh – 38K-018), 0.5 km from the road of intermunicipal significance 38H-181 (M2 "Crimea Highway" – Verkhny Khoteml), 33.5 km from the nearest railway halt Bukreyevka (railway line Oryol – Kursk).

The rural locality is situated 40 km from Kursk Vostochny Airport, 159 km from Belgorod International Airport and 231 km from Voronezh Peter the Great Airport.
