= Lesnovka, Fatezhsky District, Kursk Oblast =

Rural locality in Kursk Oblast, Russia

Lesnovka Лесновка
- Village
- Interactive map of Lesnovka
- Location of Lesnovka Lesnovka (Kursk Oblast)
- Coordinates: 52°15′16″N 35°43′46″E
- Country: Russia
- Federal subject: Kursk Oblast
- Administrative district: Fatezhsky District
- SelsovietSelsoviet: Verkhnelyubazhsky

Population (2010 Census)
  - Total: 11
  - Estimate (2010): 11 (0%)

Municipal status
  - Municipal district: Fatezhsky Municipal District
  - Rural settlement: Verkhnelyubazhsky Selsoviet Rural Settlement
- Time zone: UTC+3 (MSK)
- Postal code: 307122
- Dialing code: +7 47144
- OKTMO ID: 38644416126
- Website: моверхнелюбажский.рф

Lesnovka (Russian: Лесновка) is a rural locality (Russian: деревня, lit. 'village') in Verkhnelyubazhsky Selsoviet Rural Settlement, Fatezhsky District, Kursk Oblast, Russia. Population: 11 (2010 census); 41 (2002 census);
