= Babaninka, Kursk Oblast =

Rural locality in Kursk Oblast, Russia

Babaninka Бабанинка
- Village
- Interactive map of Babaninka
- Location of Babaninka Babaninka (Kursk Oblast)
- Coordinates: 52°07′03″N 36°03′09″E
- Country: Russia
- Federal subject: Kursk Oblast
- Administrative district: Fatezhsky District
- SelsovietSelsoviet: Bolsheannenkovsky

Population (2010 Census)
  - Total: 7
  - Estimate (2010): 7 (0%)

Municipal status
  - Municipal district: Fatezhsky Municipal District
  - Rural settlement: Bolsheannenkovsky Selsoviet Rural Settlement
- Time zone: UTC+3 (MSK)
- Postal code: 307126
- Dialing code: +7 47144
- OKTMO ID: 38644408106
- Website: мобольшеанненковский.рф

Babaninka (Russian: Бабанинка) is a rural locality (Russian: деревня, lit. 'village') in Bolsheannenkovsky Selsoviet Rural Settlement, Fatezhsky District, Kursk Oblast, Russia. Population: 7 (2010 census); 15 (2002 census);
