= Trubitsyn =

Rural locality in Kursk Oblast, Russia

Trubitsyn Трубицын
- Khutor
- Interactive map of Trubitsyn
- Location of Trubitsyn Trubitsyn (Kursk Oblast)
- Coordinates: 52°05′44″N 36°06′16″E
- Country: Russia
- Federal subject: Kursk Oblast
- Administrative district: Fatezhsky District
- SelsovietSelsoviet: Bolsheannenkovsky

Population (2010 Census)
  - Total: 4
  - Estimate (2010): 4 (0%)

Municipal status
  - Municipal district: Fatezhsky Municipal District
  - Rural settlement: Bolsheannenkovsky Selsoviet Rural Settlement
- Time zone: UTC+3 (MSK)
- Postal code: 307126
- Dialing code: +7 47144
- OKTMO ID: 38644408161
- Website: мобольшеанненковский.рф

Trubitsyn (Russian: Трубицын) is a rural locality (a khutor) in Bolsheannenkovsky Selsoviet Rural Settlement, Fatezhsky District, Kursk Oblast, Russia. Population: 4 (2010 census); 15 (2002 census);
