= Kretovka, Kursk Oblast =

Rural locality in Kursk Oblast, Russia

Kretovka Кретовка
- Village
- Interactive map of Kretovka
- Location of Kretovka Kretovka (Kursk Oblast)
- Coordinates: 52°08′13″N 36°06′07″E
- Country: Russia
- Federal subject: Kursk Oblast
- Administrative district: Fatezhsky District
- SelsovietSelsoviet: Bolsheannenkovsky

Population (2010 Census)
  - Total: 20
  - Estimate (2010): 20 (0%)

Municipal status
  - Municipal district: Fatezhsky Municipal District
  - Rural settlement: Bolsheannenkovsky Selsoviet Rural Settlement
- Time zone: UTC+3 (MSK)
- Postal code: 307126
- Dialing code: +7 47144
- OKTMO ID: 38644408131
- Website: мобольшеанненковский.рф

Kretovka (Russian: Кретовка) is a rural locality (Russian: деревня, lit. 'village') in Bolsheannenkovsky Selsoviet Rural Settlement, Fatezhsky District, Kursk Oblast, Russia. Population: 20 (2010 census); 33 (2002 census);
