= Bychki, Bolsheannenkovsky selsovet, Fatezhsky District, Kursk Oblast =

Rural locality in Kursk Oblast, Russia

Bychki Бычки
- Khutor
- Interactive map of Bychki
- Location of Bychki Bychki (Kursk Oblast)
- Coordinates: 52°05′38″N 36°04′08″E
- Country: Russia
- Federal subject: Kursk Oblast
- Administrative district: Fatezhsky District
- SelsovietSelsoviet: Bolsheannenkovsky

Population (2010 Census)
  - Total: 31
  - Estimate (2010): 31 (0%)

Municipal status
  - Municipal district: Fatezhsky Municipal District
  - Rural settlement: Bolsheannenkovsky Selsoviet Rural Settlement
- Time zone: UTC+3 (MSK)
- Postal code: 307126
- Dialing code: +7 47144
- OKTMO ID: 38644408116
- Website: мобольшеанненковский.рф

Bychki (Russian: Бычки) is a rural locality (a khutor) in Bolsheannenkovsky Selsoviet Rural Settlement, Fatezhsky District, Kursk Oblast, Russia. Population: 31 (2010 census); 44 (2002 census);
