= 1st Chaplygina =

Rural locality in Kursk Oblast, Russia

1st Chaplygina 1-я Чаплыгина
- Village
- Interactive map of 1st Chaplygina
- Location of 1st Chaplygina 1st Chaplygina (Kursk Oblast)
- Coordinates: 52°05′03″N 35°50′44″E
- Country: Russia
- Federal subject: Kursk Oblast
- Administrative district: Fatezhsky District
- SelsovietSelsoviet: Rusanovsky
- First mentioned: 17th century

Population (2010 Census)
  - Total: 159
  - Estimate (2010): 159 (0%)

Municipal status
  - Municipal district: Fatezhsky Municipal District
  - Rural settlement: Rusanovsky Selsoviet Rural Settlement
- Time zone: UTC+3 (MSK)
- Postal code: 307119
- Dialing code: +7 47144
- OKTMO ID: 38644464171
- Website: морусановский.рф

1st Chaplygina or Pervaya Chaplygina (Russian: 1-я Чаплыгина, Первая Чаплыгина) is a rural locality (Russian: деревня, lit. 'village') in Rusanovsky Selsoviet Rural Settlement, Fatezhsky District, Kursk Oblast, Russia. Population: 159 (2010 census); 181 (2002 census);

== Geography ==
The village is located on the right bank of the Usozha River (a left tributary of the Svapa in the basin of the Seym), 103 km from the Russia–Ukraine border, 45 km north-west of Kursk, and from the south-west is adjacent to the district center – namely the town Fatezh, 1 km from the selsoviet center – Basovka. There are no streets with titles.

Climate

1st Chaplygina has a warm-summer humid continental climate (Dfb in the Köppen climate classification).

== Transport ==
1st Chaplygina is located 1.5 km from the federal route M-2 Crimea Highway as part of the European route E105, 1 km from the road of regional importance 38K-038 (Fatezh – Dmitriyev), 1 km from the road of intermunicipal significance 38H-670 (38K-038 – Basovka), 31.5 km from the nearest railway station Vozy (railway line Oryol – Kursk).

The rural locality is situated 47 km from Kursk Vostochny Airport, 167 km from Belgorod International Airport and 234 km from Voronezh Peter the Great Airport.
