= Yakovlevsky =

Yakovlevsky (masculine), Yakovlevskaya (feminine), or Yakovlevskoye (neuter) may refer to:

- Dmitry Yakovlevsky (b. 1988), Russian soccer player
- Yakovlevsky District, name of several districts in Russia
- Yakovlevsky (rural locality) (Yakovlevskaya, Yakovlevskoye), name of several rural localities in Russia
