= Fatezhsky =

Fatezhsky (masculine), Fatezhskaya (feminine), or Fatezhskoye (neuter) may refer to:

- Fatezhsky District, a district of Kursk Oblast, Russia
- Fatezhskaya, a rural locality (a village) in Kurgan Oblast, Russia
