= Vesyolaya Plota =

Rural locality in Kursk Oblast, Russia

Vesyolaya Plota Весёлая Плота
- Khutor
- Interactive map of Vesyolaya Plota
- Location of Vesyolaya Plota Vesyolaya Plota (Kursk Oblast)
- Coordinates: 52°08′14″N 36°01′28″E
- Country: Russia
- Federal subject: Kursk Oblast
- Administrative district: Fatezhsky District
- SelsovietSelsoviet: Bolsheannenkovsky

Population (2010 Census)
  - Total: 11
  - Estimate (2010): 11 (0%)

Municipal status
  - Municipal district: Fatezhsky Municipal District
  - Rural settlement: Bolsheannenkovsky Selsoviet Rural Settlement
- Time zone: UTC+3 (MSK)
- Postal code: 307126
- Dialing code: +7 47144
- OKTMO ID: 38644408121
- Website: мобольшеанненковский.рф

Vesyolaya Plota (Russian: Весёлая Плота) is a rural locality (a khutor) in Bolsheannenkovsky Selsoviet Rural Settlement, Fatezhsky District, Kursk Oblast, Russia. Population: 11 (2010 census); 40 (2002 census);
