= Rassheyevka =

Rural locality in Kursk Oblast, Russia

Rassheyevka Расшеевка
- Village
- Interactive map of Rassheyevka
- Location of Rassheyevka Rassheyevka (Kursk Oblast)
- Coordinates: 52°06′08″N 36°01′22″E
- Country: Russia
- Federal subject: Kursk Oblast
- Administrative district: Fatezhsky District
- SelsovietSelsoviet: Glebovsky

Population (2010 Census)
  - Total: 4
  - Estimate (2010): 4 (0%)

Municipal status
  - Municipal district: Fatezhsky Municipal District
  - Rural settlement: Glebovsky Selsoviet Rural Settlement
- Time zone: UTC+3 (MSK)
- Postal code: 307127
- Dialing code: +7 47144
- OKTMO ID: 38644424151
- Website: моглебовский.рф

Rassheyevka (Russian: Расшеевка) is a rural locality (Russian: деревня, lit. 'village') in Glebovsky Selsoviet Rural Settlement, Fatezhsky District, Kursk Oblast, Russia. As of the 2010 Census, its population was 4.
