= Loktionovo =

Rural locality in Kursk Oblast, Russia

Loktionovo Локтионово
- Village
- Interactive map of Loktionovo
- Location of Loktionovo Loktionovo (Kursk Oblast)
- Coordinates: 52°15′09″N 35°42′43″E
- Country: Russia
- Federal subject: Kursk Oblast
- Administrative district: Fatezhsky District
- SelsovietSelsoviet: Verkhnelyubazhsky
- Elevation: 161 m (528 ft)

Population (2010 Census)
  - Total: 46
  - Estimate (2010): 46 (0%)

Municipal status
  - Municipal district: Fatezhsky Municipal District
  - Rural settlement: Verkhnelyubazhsky Selsoviet Rural Settlement
- Time zone: UTC+3 (MSK)
- Postal code: 307122
- Dialing code: +7 47144
- OKTMO ID: 38644416131
- Website: моверхнелюбажский.рф

Loktionovo (Russian: Локтионово) is a rural locality (Russian: деревня, lit. 'village') in Verkhnelyubazhsky Selsoviet Rural Settlement, Fatezhsky District, Kursk Oblast, Russia. Population: 46 (2010 census); 78 (2002 census);
