= Orlyanka, Fatezhsky District, Kursk Oblast =

Rural locality in Kursk Oblast, Russia

Orlyanka Орлянка
- Village
- Interactive map of Orlyanka
- Location of Orlyanka Orlyanka (Kursk Oblast)
- Coordinates: 52°08′33″N 36°06′45″E
- Country: Russia
- Federal subject: Kursk Oblast
- Administrative district: Fatezhsky District
- SelsovietSelsoviet: Bolsheannenkovsky

Population (2010 Census)
  - Total: 25
  - Estimate (2010): 25 (0%)

Municipal status
  - Municipal district: Fatezhsky Municipal District
  - Rural settlement: Bolsheannenkovsky Selsoviet Rural Settlement
- Time zone: UTC+3 (MSK)
- Postal code: 307126
- Dialing code: +7 47144
- OKTMO ID: 38644408151
- Website: мобольшеанненковский.рф

Orlyanka (Russian: Орлянка) is a rural locality (Russian: деревня, lit. 'village') in Bolsheannenkovsky Selsoviet Rural Settlement, Fatezhsky District, Kursk Oblast, Russia. The population as of 2010 is 25.
