= Krasavchik =

Rural locality in Kursk Oblast, Russia

Krasavchik Красавчик
- Khutor
- Interactive map of Krasavchik
- Location of Krasavchik Krasavchik (Kursk Oblast)
- Coordinates: 52°13′01″N 35°43′46″E
- Country: Russia
- Federal subject: Kursk Oblast
- Administrative district: Fatezhsky District
- SelsovietSelsoviet: Verkhnelyubazhsky

Population (2010 Census)
  - Total: 28
  - Estimate (2010): 28 (0%)

Municipal status
  - Municipal district: Fatezhsky Municipal District
  - Rural settlement: Verkhnelyubazhsky Selsoviet Rural Settlement
- Time zone: UTC+3 (MSK)
- Postal code: 307122
- Dialing code: +7 47144
- OKTMO ID: 38644416121
- Website: моверхнелюбажский.рф

Krasavchik (Russian: Красавчик) is a rural locality (a khutor) in Verkhnelyubazhsky Selsoviet Rural Settlement, Fatezhsky District, Kursk Oblast, Russia. Population: 28 (2010 census); 57 (2002 census);
