= Bugryanka =

Rural locality in Kursk Oblast, Russia

Bugryanka Бугрянка
- Village
- Interactive map of Bugryanka
- Location of Bugryanka Bugryanka (Kursk Oblast)
- Coordinates: 52°06′43″N 35°56′05″E
- Country: Russia
- Federal subject: Kursk Oblast
- Administrative district: Fatezhsky District
- SelsovietSelsoviet: Glebovsky

Population (2010 Census)
  - Total: 17
  - Estimate (2010): 17 (0%)

Municipal status
  - Municipal district: Fatezhsky Municipal District
  - Rural settlement: Glebovsky Selsoviet Rural Settlement
- Time zone: UTC+3 (MSK)
- Postal code: 307127
- Dialing code: +7 47144
- OKTMO ID: 38644424106
- Website: моглебовский.рф

Bugryanka (Russian: Бугрянка) is a rural locality (Russian: деревня, lit. 'village') in Glebovsky Selsoviet Rural Settlement, Fatezhsky District, Kursk Oblast, Russia. Population: 17 (2010 census); 29 (2002 census);
