= Sredny Lyubazh =

Rural locality in Kursk Oblast, Russia

Sredny Lyubazh Средний Любаж
- Village
- Interactive map of Sredny Lyubazh
- Location of Sredny Lyubazh Sredny Lyubazh (Kursk Oblast)
- Coordinates: 52°12′32″N 35°48′20″E
- Country: Russia
- Federal subject: Kursk Oblast
- Administrative district: Fatezhsky District
- SelsovietSelsoviet: Verkhnelyubazhsky

Population (2010 Census)
  - Total: 158
  - Estimate (2010): 158 (0%)

Municipal status
  - Municipal district: Fatezhsky Municipal District
  - Rural settlement: Verkhnelyubazhsky Selsoviet Rural Settlement
- Time zone: UTC+3 (MSK)
- Postal code: 307120
- Dialing code: +7 47144
- OKTMO ID: 38644416111
- Website: моверхнелюбажский.рф

Sredny Lyubazh (Russian: Средний Любаж) is a rural locality (Russian: деревня, lit. 'village') in Verkhnelyubazhsky Selsoviet Rural Settlement, Fatezhsky District, Kursk Oblast, Russia. Population: 158 (2010 census); 174 (2002 census);
