= Nizhny Reut =

Rural locality in Kursk Oblast, Russia

Nizhny Reut Нижний Реут
- Selo
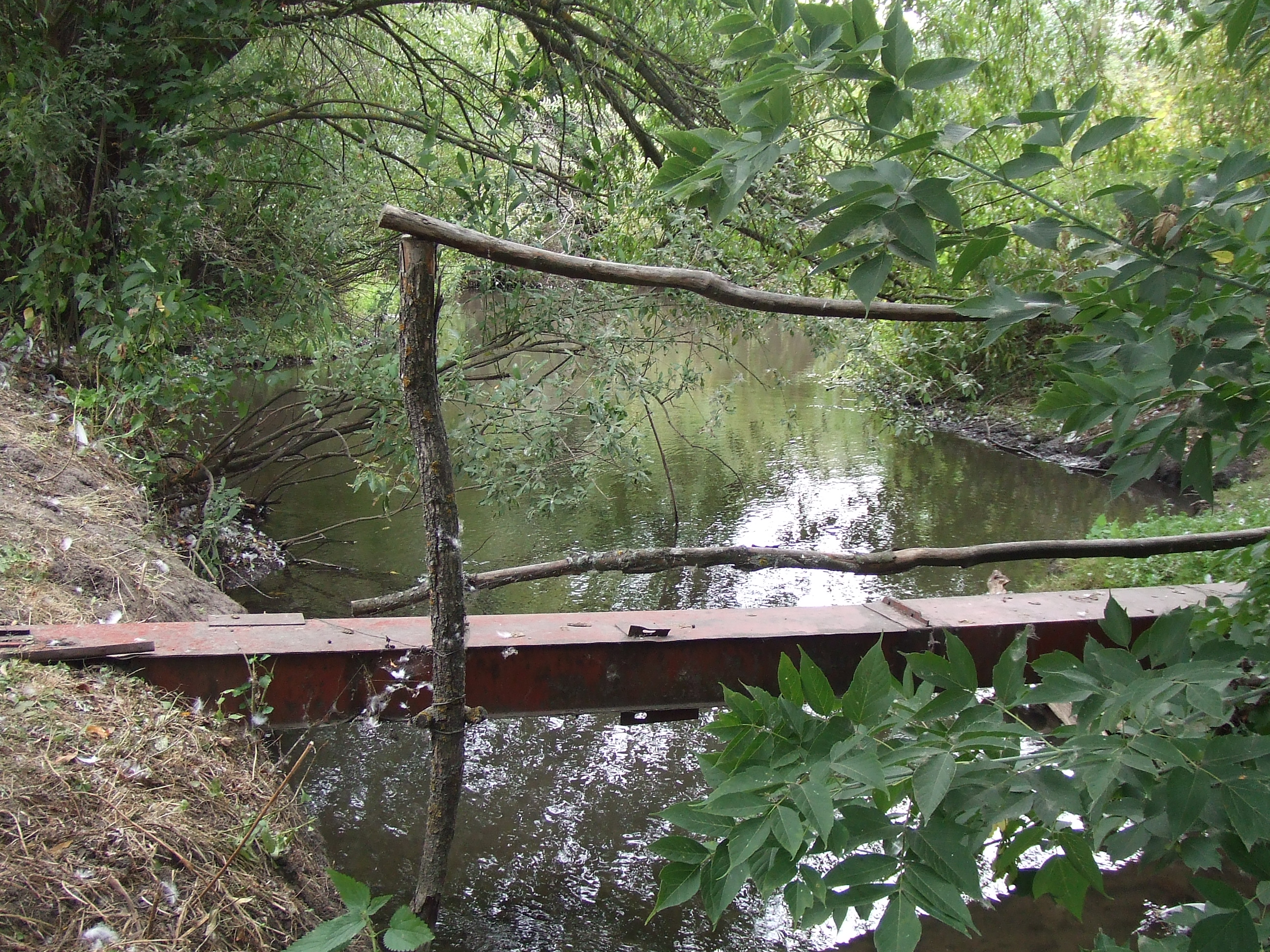
- The current of the Reut River in the selo
- Interactive map of Nizhny Reut
- Location of Nizhny Reut Nizhny Reut (Kursk Oblast)
- Coordinates: 52°10′27″N 35°44′52″E
- Country: Russia
- Federal subject: Kursk Oblast
- Administrative district: Fatezhsky District
- SelsovietSelsoviet: Rusanovsky

Population (2010 Census)
  - Total: 136
  - Estimate (2010): 136 (0%)

Municipal status
  - Municipal district: Fatezhsky Municipal District
  - Rural settlement: Rusanovsky Selsoviet Rural Settlement
- Time zone: UTC+3 (MSK)
- Postal code: 307121
- Dialing code: +7 47144
- OKTMO ID: 38644464181
- Website: морусановский.рф

Nizhny Reut (Russian: Нижний Реут) is a rural locality (Russian: село, lit. 'village') in Rusanovsky Selsoviet Rural Settlement, Fatezhsky District, Kursk Oblast, Russia. The population was 136 as of the 2010 census.

== Geography ==
The village is situated on the Reut River (a left tributary of the Zhelen in the Svapa basin), 99.5 kilometers (61.8 mi) from the Russia–Ukraine border, 57 kilometers (35 mi) north-west of Kursk, 12 kilometers (7.5 mi) north-west of the district center, Fatezh, and 11 kilometers (6.8 mi) from the selsoviet center, Basovka.

=== Climate ===
Nizhny Reut experiences a warm-summer humid continental climate (Dfb in the Köppen climate classification).

== Transport ==
Nizhny Reut is located 6 km (3.7 mi) from the federal route M-2 Crimea Highway (part of the European route E105), 7 km (4.3 mi) from the regional road 38K-038 (Fatezh – Dmitriyev), on the intermunicipal road 38H-675 (38K-038 – Nizhny Reut – Putchino), and 22.5 km from the nearest railway halt 34 km (Arbuzovo – Luzhki-Orlovskiye railway line).

The village is 59.5 km from Kursk Vostochny Airport, 179 km from Belgorod International Airport and 242 km from Voronezh Peter the Great Airport.
