= Mirolyubovo, Kursk Oblast =

Rural locality in Kursk Oblast, Russia

Mirolyubovo Миролюбово
- Village
- Interactive map of Mirolyubovo
- Location of Mirolyubovo Mirolyubovo (Kursk Oblast)
- Coordinates: 52°03′06″N 35°50′53″E
- Country: Russia
- Federal subject: Kursk Oblast
- Administrative district: Fatezhsky District
- SelsovietSelsoviet: Verkhnekhotemlsky
- Elevation: 201 m (659 ft)

Population (2010 Census)
  - Total: 382
  - Estimate (2010): 382 (0%)

Municipal status
  - Municipal district: Fatezhsky Municipal District
  - Rural settlement: Verkhnekhotemlsky Selsoviet Rural Settlement
- Time zone: UTC+3 (MSK)
- Postal code: 307110
- Dialing code: +7 47144
- OKTMO ID: 38644420146
- Website: моверхнехотемльский.рф

Mirolyubovo (Russian: Миролюбово) is a rural locality (Russian: деревня, lit. 'village') in Verkhnekhotemlsky Selsoviet Rural Settlement, Fatezhsky District, Kursk Oblast, Russia. The population as of 2010 is 382.

== Geography ==
The village is located on the Verkhny Khoteml Brook (a link tributary of the Usozha in the basin of the Svapa), 102 km from the Russia–Ukraine border, 41.5 km north-west of Kursk, 3.5 km south-west of the district center – the town Fatezh, 5.5 km from the selsoviet center – Verkhny Khoteml.

=== Climate ===
Mirolyubovo has a warm-summer humid continental climate (Dfb in the Köppen climate classification).

== Transport ==
Mirolyubovo is located 1.5 km from the federal route M-2 Crimea Highway as part of the European route E105, 4 km from the road of regional importance 38K-038 (Fatezh – Dmitriyev), on the road of intermunicipal significance 38H-224 (M2 "Crimea Highway" – Mirolyubovo), 33 km from the nearest railway station Vozy (railway line Oryol – Kursk).

The rural locality is situated 44.5 km from Kursk Vostochny Airport, 163 km from Belgorod International Airport and 234 km from Voronezh Peter the Great Airport.
