= Yakovlevsky District =

Location of Belgorod Oblast in Russia

Location of Primorsky Krai in Russia

Yakovlevsky District is the name of several administrative and municipal districts in Russia:

- Yakovlevsky District, Belgorod Oblast, an administrative and municipal district of Belgorod Oblast
- Yakovlevsky District, Primorsky Krai, an administrative and municipal district of Primorsky Krai

== See also ==
- Yakovlevsky (disambiguation)
