= Chibisovka =

Rural locality in Kursk Oblast, Russia

Chibisovka Чибисовка
- Village
- Interactive map of Chibisovka
- Location of Chibisovka Chibisovka (Kursk Oblast)
- Coordinates: 52°04′32″N 35°49′13″E
- Country: Russia
- Federal subject: Kursk Oblast
- Administrative district: Fatezhsky District
- SelsovietSelsoviet: Rusanovsky

Population (2010 Census)
  - Total: 54
  - Estimate (2010): 54 (0%)

Municipal status
  - Municipal district: Fatezhsky Municipal District
  - Rural settlement: Rusanovsky Selsoviet Rural Settlement
- Time zone: UTC+3 (MSK)
- Postal code: 307119
- Dialing code: +7 47144
- OKTMO ID: 38644464176
- Website: морусановский.рф

Chibisovka (Russian: Чибисовка) is a rural locality (Russian: деревня, lit. 'village') in Rusanovsky Selsoviet Rural Settlement, Fatezhsky District, Kursk Oblast, Russia. Population: 54 (2010 census); 59 (2002 census);

== Geography ==
The village is located on the Usozha River (a left tributary of the Svapa in the basin of the Seym) and its tributary, Verkhny Khoteml Brook, 100 km from the Russia–Ukraine border, 45 km north-west of Kursk, 2.5 km south-west of the district center – the town Fatezh, 1.5 km from the selsoviet center – Basovka.

Climate

Chibisovka has a warm-summer humid continental climate (Dfb in the Köppen climate classification).

== Transport ==
Chibisovka is located 0.3 km from the federal route M-2 Crimea Highway as part of the European route E105, 2.5 km from the road of regional importance 38K-038 (Fatezh – Dmitriyev), on the road of intermunicipal significance 38H-255 (M2 "Crimea Highway" – Chibisovka), 32.5 km from the nearest railway halt 29 km (railway line Arbuzovo – Luzhki-Orlovskiye).

The rural locality is situated 48 km from Kursk Vostochny Airport, 166 km from Belgorod International Airport and 236 km from Voronezh Peter the Great Airport.
