= Putchino, Kursk Oblast =

Rural locality in Kursk Oblast, Russia

Putchino Путчино
- Village
- Interactive map of Putchino
- Location of Putchino Putchino (Kursk Oblast)
- Coordinates: 52°10′05″N 35°41′51″E
- Country: Russia
- Federal subject: Kursk Oblast
- Administrative district: Fatezhsky District
- SelsovietSelsoviet: Rusanovsky

Population (2010 Census)
  - Total: 93
  - Estimate (2010): 93 (0%)

Municipal status
  - Municipal district: Fatezhsky Municipal District
  - Rural settlement: Rusanovsky Selsoviet Rural Settlement
- Time zone: UTC+3 (MSK)
- Postal code: 307121
- Dialing code: +7 47144
- OKTMO ID: 38644464196
- Website: морусановский.рф

Putchino (Russian: Путчино) is a rural locality (Russian: деревня, lit. 'village') in Rusanovsky Selsoviet Rural Settlement, Fatezhsky District, Kursk Oblast, Russia. The population as of 2010 is 93.

== Geography ==
The village is located on the Putchinka River (a left tributary of the Krasavka in the basin of the Svapa), 96 km from the Russia–Ukraine border, 58 km north-west of Kursk, 13.5 km north-west of the district center – the town Fatezh, 12.5 km from the selsoviet center – Basovka.

=== Climate ===
Putchino has a warm-summer humid continental climate (Dfb in the Köppen climate classification).

== Transport ==
Putchino is located 9.5 km from the federal route M-2 Crimea Highway as part of the European route E105, 7 km from the road of regional importance 38K-038 (Fatezh – Dmitriyev), on the road of intermunicipal significance 38H-675 (38K-038 – Nizhny Reut – Putchino), 20 km from the nearest railway halt 34 km (railway line Arbuzovo – Luzhki-Orlovskiye).

The rural locality is situated 61 km from Kursk Vostochny Airport, 179 km from Belgorod International Airport and 245 km from Voronezh Peter the Great Airport.
