= Mazepovka =

Rural locality in Rylsky District, Kursk Oblast, Russia

Coordinates: 51°36′50″N 34°50′20″E

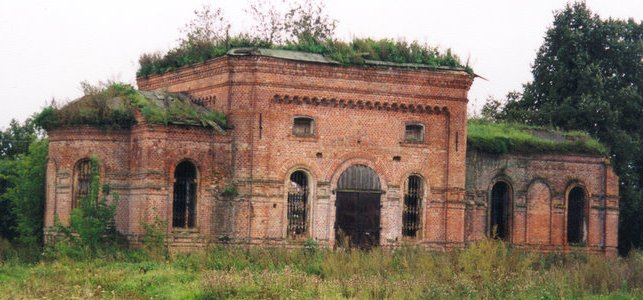
Ruins of a 1895 church in Mazepovka

Mazepovka (Russian: Мазеповка is a village in the Rylsky District, Kursk Oblast, Russia, north-east off Rylsk.

== History ==
During the reign of Peter the Great, granted Ivan Mazepa, Hetman of the Zaporozhian Host and the Left-bank Ukraine permission to populate the empty Russian lands bordering with Ukraine by the Ukrainians. In January and November 1703, upon the petitions from Mazepa, Peter granted the lands bought by Mazepa to become his votchina (hereditary estate). In these lands, the villages of Mazepovka (after the surname) and Stepanovka (after Mazepa's given name), and a number of others, were founded or already existed. (Note: Mazepovka existed before Mazepa's purchase; this name is not listed in the detailed treatise, Плохинский, М. Гетман Мазепа в роли великорусского помещика) After Mazepa's betrayal, all his lands were granted to Aleksandr Menshikov. After Manshikov's fall these lands were transferred to Eudoxia Lopukhina, Peter's wife and tsarina-consort. Laner the ownership changed several times.
