= Yakovlevskoye, Vologodsky District, Vologda Oblast =

Yakovlevskoye Яковлевское
- Village
- Location within Vologda Oblast Location within Russia
- Coordinates: 59°21′N 39°45′E
- Country: Russia
- Region: Vologda Oblast
- District: Vologodsky District
- Time zone: UTC+3:00

Yakovlevskoye (Russian: Яковлевское) is a rural locality (a village) in Semyonkovskoye Rural Settlement, Vologodsky District, Vologda Oblast, Russia. The population was 1 as of 2002.

== Geography ==
Yakovlevskoye is located 21 km northwest of Vologda (the district's administrative centre) by road. Fetinino is the nearest rural locality.
