= Kursky District =

Administrative/municipal district name

Location of Kursk Oblast in Russia

Location of Stavropol Krai in Russia

Kursky District is the name of several administrative and municipal districts in Russia:

- Kursky District, Kursk Oblast, an administrative and municipal district of Kursk Oblast
- Kursky District, Stavropol Krai, an administrative and municipal district of Stavropol Krai

== See also ==
- Kursky (disambiguation)
