= Yakovlevskoye, Ustyuzhensky District, Vologda Oblast =

Yakovlevskoye Яковлевское
- Village
- Location within Vologda Oblast Location within Russia
- Coordinates: 58°48′N 36°09′E
- Country: Russia
- Region: Vologda Oblast
- District: Ustyuzhensky District
- Time zone: UTC+3:00

Yakovlevskoye (Russian: Яковлевское) is a rural locality (a village) in Ustyuzhenskoye Rural Settlement, Ustyuzhensky District, Vologda Oblast, Russia. The population was 247 as of 2002. There are 3 streets.

== Geography ==
Yakovlevskoye is located 25 km (16 mi) southwest of Ustyuzhna (the district's administrative centre) by road. Popovka is the nearest rural locality.
