= 2nd Banino =

Rural locality in Kursk Oblast, Russia

2nd Banino 2-е Банино
- Selo
- Interactive map of 2nd Banino
- Location of 2nd Banino 2nd Banino (Kursk Oblast)
- Coordinates: 52°07′52″N 35°56′07″E
- Country: Russia
- Federal subject: Kursk Oblast
- Administrative district: Fatezhsky District
- SelsovietSelsoviet: Baninsky

Population (2010 Census)
  - Total: 78
  - Estimate (2010): 78 (0%)

Municipal status
  - Municipal district: Fatezhsky Municipal District
  - Rural settlement: Baninsky Selsoviet Rural Settlement
- Time zone: UTC+3 (MSK)
- Postal code: 307109
- Dialing code: +7 47144
- OKTMO ID: 38644402106
- Website: мобанинский.рф

2nd Banino or Vtoroye Banino (Russian: 2-е Банино, Второе Банино) is a rural locality (Russian: село, lit. 'village') in Baninsky Selsoviet Rural Settlement, Fatezhsky District, Kursk Oblast, Russia. Population: 78 (2010 census); 112 (2002 census);

== Geography ==
The village is located on the Gnilovodchik River (a link tributary of the Usozha in the basin of the Svapa), 110 km from the Russia–Ukraine border, 47 km north-west of Kursk, 6.5 km (16 km by road) north-east of the district center – the town Fatezh, 6 km from the selsoviet center – Chermoshnoy. There are no streets with titles.

Climate

2nd Banino has a warm-summer humid continental climate (Dfb in the Köppen climate classification).

== Transport ==
2nd Banino is located 6.5 km from the federal route M-2 Crimea Highway as part of the European route E105, 7 km from the road of regional importance 38K-038 (Fatezh – Dmitriyev), 0.5 km from the road of intermunicipal significance 38H-233 (M2 "Crimea Highway" – 1st Banino), 24 km from the nearest railway station Vozy (railway line Oryol – Kursk).

The rural locality is situated 48 km from Kursk Vostochny Airport, 170 km from Belgorod International Airport and 229 km from Voronezh Peter the Great Airport.
