= Milenino, Kursk Oblast =

Rural locality in Kursk Oblast, Russia

Milenino Миленино
- Selo
- Interactive map of Milenino
- Location of Milenino Milenino (Kursk Oblast)
- Coordinates: 52°05′11″N 35°53′37″E
- Country: Russia
- Federal subject: Kursk Oblast
- Administrative district: Fatezhsky District
- SelsovietSelsoviet: Mileninsky

Population (2010 Census)
  - Total: 295
  - Estimate (2010): 295 (0%)

Administrative status
  - Capital of: Mileninsky Selsoviet

Municipal status
  - Municipal district: Fatezhsky Municipal District
  - Rural settlement: Mileninsky Selsoviet Rural Settlement
  - Capital of: Mileninsky Selsoviet Rural Settlement
- Time zone: UTC+3 (MSK)
- Postal code: 307107
- Dialing code: +7 47144
- OKTMO ID: 38644444101
- Website: момиленинский.рф

Milenino (Russian: Миленино) is a rural locality (Russian: село, lit. 'village') and the administrative center of Mileninsky Selsoviet Rural Settlement, Fatezhsky District, Kursk Oblast, Russia. The population as of 2010 is 295.

== Geography ==
The village is located on the Usozha River (a left tributary of the Svapa in the basin of the Seym), 106 km from the Russia–Ukraine border, 44 km north-west of Kursk, 1.5 km east of the district center – the town Fatezh.

=== Climate ===
Milenino has a warm-summer humid continental climate (Dfb in the Köppen climate classification).

== Transport ==
Milenino is located 1 km from the federal route M-2 Crimea Highway as part of the European route E105, 27 km from the road of regional importance 38K-018 (Kursk – Ponyri), 4 km from the road 38K-039 (Fatezh – 38K-018), on the road of intermunicipal significance 38H-688 (Fatezh – Milenino), 1.5 km from the road 38H-210 (M2 "Crimea Highway" – Zykovka – Maloye Annenkovo – 38K-039), on the road 38H-211 (38N-210 – Bugry), 28 km from the nearest railway station Vozy (railway line Oryol – Kursk).

The rural locality is situated 45 km from Kursk Vostochny Airport, 166 km from Belgorod International Airport and 231 km from Voronezh Peter the Great Airport.
