= 2nd Mokva =

Rural locality in Kursk Oblast, Russia

2nd Mokva 2-я Моква
- Village
- Interactive map of 2nd Mokva
- Location of 2nd Mokva 2nd Mokva (Kursk Oblast)
- Coordinates: 51°41′53″N 36°04′34″E
- Country: Russia
- Federal subject: Kursk Oblast
- Administrative district: Kursky District
- SelsovietSelsoviet: Mokovsky

Population (2010 Census)
  - Total: 310
  - Estimate (2010): 310 (0%)

Municipal status
  - Municipal district: Kursky Municipal District
  - Rural settlement: Mokovsky Selsoviet Rural Settlement
- Time zone: UTC+3 (MSK)
- Postal code: 305520
- Dialing code: +7 4712
- OKTMO ID: 38620436131
- Website: mokva.rkursk.ru

2nd Mokva or Vtoraya Mokva (Russian: 2-я Моква, Вторая Моква) is a rural locality (Russian: деревня, lit. 'village') in Mokovsky Selsoviet Rural Settlement, Kursky District, Kursk Oblast, Russia. Population: 310 (2010 census); 303 (2002 census);

== Geography ==
The village is located on the Seym River (a left tributary of the Desna) and its right tributary, Mokva, 84 km from the Russia–Ukraine border, 3 km (13 km of it by road) southwest of Kursk, at the southern border of the selsoviet center – 1st Mokva.

Streets

There are the following streets in the village: Kashtanovaya, Lazurnaya, Mostovaya, Pionerskaya, Raduzhnaya, Rechnaya, Yasenevaya, Yasnaya and Zvyozdnaya (112 houses).

Climate

2nd Mokva has a warm-summer humid continental climate (Dfb in the Köppen climate classification).

== Transport ==
2nd Mokva is located on the federal route M-2 Crimea Highway (a part of the European route E105), 5 km from the nearest railway station Ryshkovo (railway line Lgov I — Kursk).

The rural locality is situated 15 km from Kursk Vostochny Airport, 121 km from Belgorod International Airport and 218 km from Voronezh Peter the Great Airport.
