= 2nd Gnezdilovo =

Rural locality in Kursk Oblast, Russia

2nd Gnezdilovo 2-е Гнездилово
- Selo
- Interactive map of 2nd Gnezdilovo
- Location of 2nd Gnezdilovo 2nd Gnezdilovo (Kursk Oblast)
- Coordinates: 51°57′00″N 35°36′31″E
- Country: Russia
- Federal subject: Kursk Oblast
- Administrative district: Fatezhsky District
- SelsovietSelsoviet: Soldatsky

Population (2010 Census)
  - Total: 13
  - Estimate (2010): 13 (0%)

Municipal status
  - Municipal district: Fatezhsky Municipal District
  - Rural settlement: Soldatsky Selsoviet Rural Settlement
- Time zone: UTC+3 (MSK)
- Postal code: 307112
- Dialing code: +7 47144
- OKTMO ID: 38644468291
- Website: мосолдатский.рф

2nd Gnezdilovo or Vtoroye Gnezdilovo (Russian: 2-е Гнездилово, Второе Гнездилово) is a rural locality (Russian: село, lit. 'village') in Soldatsky Selsoviet Rural Settlement, Fatezhsky District, Kursk Oblast, Russia. Population: 13 (2010 census); 42 (2002 census); 71 (1989 Soviet census).

== Geography ==
The village is located on the Ruda River (a link tributary of the Usozha in the basin of the Svapa), 83 km from the Russia–Ukraine border, 47 km north-west of Kursk, 23 km (34 km by road) south-west of the district center – the town Fatezh, 16.5 km from the selsoviet center – Soldatskoye. There are no streets with titles.

Climate

2nd Gnezdilovo has a warm-summer humid continental climate (Dfb in the Köppen climate classification).

== Transport ==
2nd Gnezdilovo is located 22 km from the federal route M-2 Crimea Highway as part of the European route E105, 16.5 km from the road of regional importance 38K-038 (Fatezh – Dmitriyev), 13 km from the road 38K-005 (Konyshyovka – Zhigayevo – 38K-038), 3 km from the road of intermunicipal significance 38Н-679 (38K-038 – Soldatskoye – Shuklino), 21.5 km from the nearest railway halt 552 km (railway line Navlya – Lgov-Kiyevsky).

The rural locality is situated 51 km from Kursk Vostochny Airport, 159 km from Belgorod International Airport and 249 km from Voronezh Peter the Great Airport.
