= Zykovka, Kursk Oblast =

Rural locality in Kursk Oblast, Russia

Zykovka Зыковка
- Village
- Location of Zykovka
- Location of Zykovka Zykovka (Kursk Oblast)
- Coordinates: 52°05′10″N 35°58′41″E
- Country: Russia
- Federal subject: Kursk Oblast
- Administrative district: Fatezhsky District
- Selsoviet: Glebovsky

Population (2010 Census)
  - Total: 142

Administrative status
  - Capital of: Glebovsky Selsoviet

Municipal status
  - Municipal district: Fatezhsky Municipal District
  - Rural settlement: Glebovsky Selsoviet Rural Settlement
  - Capital of: Glebovsky Selsoviet Rural Settlement
- Time zone: UTC+3 (MSK)
- Postal code(s): 307127
- Dialing code(s): +7 47144
- OKTMO ID: 38644424101
- Website: моглебовский.рф

Zykovka (Russian: Зыковка) is a rural locality (Russian: деревня, lit. 'village') and the administrative center of Glebovsky Selsoviet Rural Settlement, Fatezhsky District, Kursk Oblast, Russia. Population: 142 (2010 Census); 143 (2002 Census);

== Geography ==
The village is located on the Shmarny Brook (a link tributary of the Usozha in the basin of the Svapa), 110 km from the Russia–Ukraine border, 41 km north-west of Kursk, 7 km east of the district center – the town Fatezh.

Climate

Zykovka has a warm-summer humid continental climate (Dfb in the Köppen climate classification).

== Transport ==
Zykovka is located 7 km from the federal route M-2 Crimea Highway as part of the European route E105, 21 km from the road of regional importance 38K-018 (Kursk – Ponyri), 7 km from the road 38K-039 (Fatezh – 38K-018), on the road of intermunicipal significance 38H-210 (M2 "Crimea Highway" – Zykovka – Maloye Annenkovo – 38K-039), 23 km from the nearest railway station Vozy (railway line Oryol – Kursk).

The rural locality is situated 42.5 km from Kursk Vostochny Airport, 164 km from Belgorod International Airport and 225 km from Voronezh Peter the Great Airport.
