= Verkhny Khoteml =

Rural locality in Kursk Oblast, Russia

Verkhny Khoteml Верхний Хотемль
- Village
- Interactive map of Verkhny Khoteml
- Location of Verkhny Khoteml Verkhny Khoteml (Kursk Oblast)
- Coordinates: 52°00′41″N 35°52′26″E
- Country: Russia
- Federal subject: Kursk Oblast
- Administrative district: Fatezhsky District
- SelsovietSelsoviet: Verkhnekhotemlsky

Population (2010 Census)
  - Total: 67
  - Estimate (2010): 67 (0%)

Administrative status
  - Capital of: Verkhnekhotemlsky Selsoviet

Municipal status
  - Municipal district: Fatezhsky Municipal District
  - Rural settlement: Verkhnekhotemlsky Selsoviet Rural Settlement
  - Capital of: Verkhnekhotemlsky Selsoviet Rural Settlement
- Time zone: UTC+3 (MSK)
- Postal code: 307115
- Dialing code: +7 47144
- OKTMO ID: 38644420101
- Website: моверхнехотемльский.рф

Verkhny Khoteml (Russian: Верхний Хотемль) is a rural locality (Russian: деревня, lit. 'village') and the administrative center of Verkhnekhotemlsky Selsoviet Rural Settlement, Fatezhsky District, Kursk Oblast, Russia. Population: 67 (2010 census); 101 (2002 census);

== Geography ==
The village is located on the Verkhny Khoteml Brook (a link tributary of the Usozha in the basin of the Svapa), 101 km from the Russia–Ukraine border, 37 km north-west of Kursk, 8 km south of the district center – the town Fatezh.

Climate

Verkhny Khoteml has a warm-summer humid continental climate (Dfb in the Köppen climate classification).

Climate data for Verkhny Khoteml
Month	Jan	Feb	Mar	Apr	May	Jun	Jul	Aug	Sep	Oct	Nov	Dec	Year
Mean daily maximum °C (°F)	−4.4 (24.1)	−3.5 (25.7)	2.2 (36.0)	12.6 (54.7)	18.9 (66.0)	22.2 (72.0)	24.9 (76.8)	24.1 (75.4)	17.7 (63.9)	10.1 (50.2)	3 (37)	−1.5 (29.3)	10.5 (50.9)
Daily mean °C (°F)	−6.4 (20.5)	−5.9 (21.4)	−1.2 (29.8)	7.8 (46.0)	14.4 (57.9)	18 (64)	20.6 (69.1)	19.6 (67.3)	13.6 (56.5)	6.9 (44.4)	0.9 (33.6)	−3.4 (25.9)	7.1 (44.7)
Mean daily minimum °C (°F)	−8.9 (16.0)	−8.9 (16.0)	−5.1 (22.8)	2.4 (36.3)	8.8 (47.8)	12.7 (54.9)	15.6 (60.1)	14.6 (58.3)	9.5 (49.1)	3.7 (38.7)	−1.4 (29.5)	−5.5 (22.1)	3.1 (37.6)
Average precipitation mm (inches)	52 (2.0)	45 (1.8)	47 (1.9)	51 (2.0)	62 (2.4)	73 (2.9)	77 (3.0)	57 (2.2)	60 (2.4)	60 (2.4)	48 (1.9)	50 (2.0)	682 (26.9)
Source: https://en.climate-data.org/asia/russian-federation/kursk-oblast/верхнии-хотемль-660897/

== Transport ==
Verkhny Khoteml is located 2 km from the federal route M-2 Crimea Highway as part of the European route E105, 9.5 km from the road of regional importance 38K-038 (Fatezh – Dmitriyev), 28.5 km from the road 38K-018 (Kursk – Ponyri), 4 km from the road 38K-039 (Fatezh – 38K-018), on the road of intermunicipal significance 38H-181 (M2 "Crimea Highway" – Verkhny Khoteml), 33 km from the nearest railway halt Bukreyevka (railway line Oryol – Kursk).

The rural locality is situated 40 km from Kursk Vostochny Airport, 159 km from Belgorod International Airport and 231 km from Voronezh Peter the Great Airport.
