= Maloye Annenkovo =

Rural locality in Kursk Oblast, Russia

Maloye Annenkovo Малое Анненково
- Village
- Interactive map of Maloye Annenkovo
- Location of Maloye Annenkovo Maloye Annenkovo (Kursk Oblast)
- Coordinates: 52°07′09″N 36°03′54″E
- Country: Russia
- Federal subject: Kursk Oblast
- Administrative district: Fatezhsky District
- SelsovietSelsoviet: Bolsheannenkovsky
- Elevation: 210 m (690 ft)

Population (2010 Census)
  - Total: 137
  - Estimate (2010): 137 (0%)

Municipal status
  - Municipal district: Fatezhsky Municipal District
  - Rural settlement: Bolsheannenkovsky Selsoviet Rural Settlement
- Time zone: UTC+3 (MSK)
- Postal code: 307126
- Dialing code: +7 47144
- OKTMO ID: 38644408136
- Website: мобольшеанненковский.рф

Maloye Annenkovo (Russian: Малое Анненково) is a rural locality (Russian: деревня, lit. 'village') in Bolsheannenkovsky Selsoviet Rural Settlement, Fatezhsky District, Kursk Oblast, Russia. The population as of 2010 is 137.
