= Ponyri, Ponyrovsky District, Kursk Oblast =

Ponyri Поныри
- Urban-type settlement
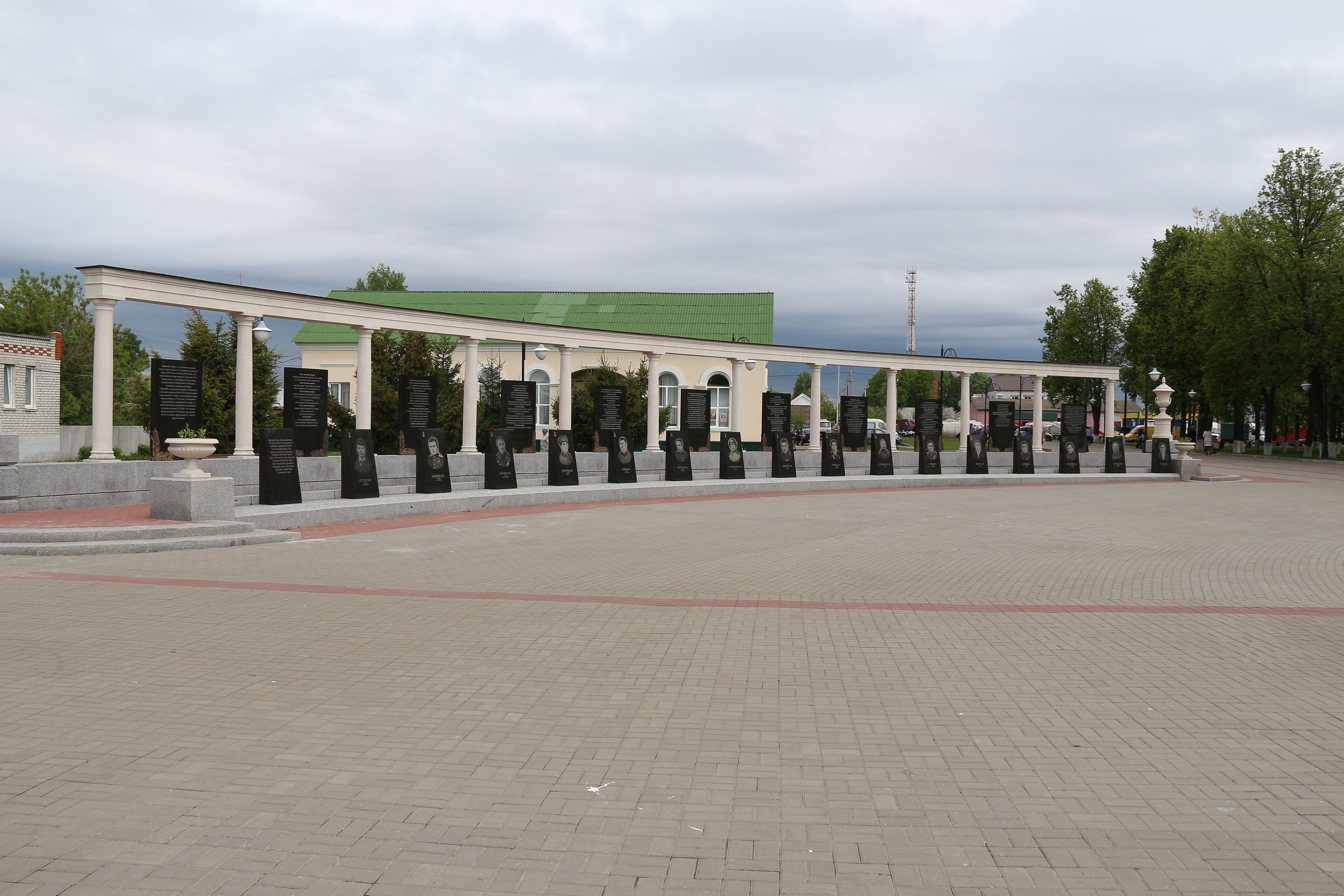
- A square in Ponyri.
- Interactive map of Ponyri
- Location within Russia
- Coordinates: 52.313520°N 36.302621°E
- Country: Russia
- Oblast: Kursk Oblast
- District: Ponyrovski District

Population (2015)
  - Total: 4,801
  - Estimate (2016): 4,803

Ponyri is an urban-type settlement in the Ponyrovsky District of the Kursk Oblast. It has been famous for its apples, known as Antonovskiye Yabloki (English: Antonov's apples [variety]) In the Soviet era it largely consisted of two state farms (sovkhozi), Ponyri 1 and 2. In English-language publications it is sometimes referred to as Ponyri Station, due to its location on the railway between Oryol and Kursk. Population: 4,916 (2021 census); 4,791 (2010 census); 4,697 (2002 census); 4,941 (1989 Soviet census).

== Great Patriotic War ==
Following the Nazi invasion, Ponyri was not under threat of occupation until late October, 1941, when the German XXXXVIII Motorized Corps pushed through against minimal resistance but while enduring minimal supplies and appalling weather on its way to Kursk.

Ponyri remained under German occupation until February, 1943. In the course of the Soviet winter counter-offensive on the southern half of the front, following their victory at Stalingrad, elements of Bryansk Front's 48th and 13th Armies liberated the settlement on February 9. The Soviet advance was brought to a halt in late February with the lines several kilometres north of Ponyri, and they began to dig in, at first as a matter of course, and then more seriously as a summer German offensive was anticipated.

== Battle of Kursk ==
The north shoulder of the Kursk salient was defended by 13th Army of Gen. K.K. Rokossovsky's Central Front in the first line. On April 21, Rokossovsky was ordered by STAVKA to evacuate the civilian population from the frontal zone to a depth of 25 km, including Ponyri, so as to adapt the evacuated towns, villages and settlements for defense.

The first attacks on Ponyri came from the air on the first morning of the battle. Rokossovsky had anticipated that the main German 9th Army attack would come straight down the rail line, but in fact it struck somewhat farther west, and he scrambled to get reserves into place. The 3rd Tank Corps was deployed to the south of Ponyri in the afternoon, as well as the 3rd and 4th Guards Airborne Divisions, in support of the 307th Rifle Division.

On the following days the 9th and 18th Panzer Divisions gradually pushed into Ponyri, at great cost to both sides. The German writer, Paul Carell, described it as "the Stalingrad of the Kursk salient." The 307th fiercely contested the schoolhouse, the water tower, the train and the field tractor stations. The 1023rd Rifle Regiment hung on to the high ground of Hill 253.5, just to the south of the settlement, and by July 11 the German forces were stuck fast, many kilometres from their objectives.
