= Fatezhsky District =

Fatezhsky District Фатежский район (Russian)
- District
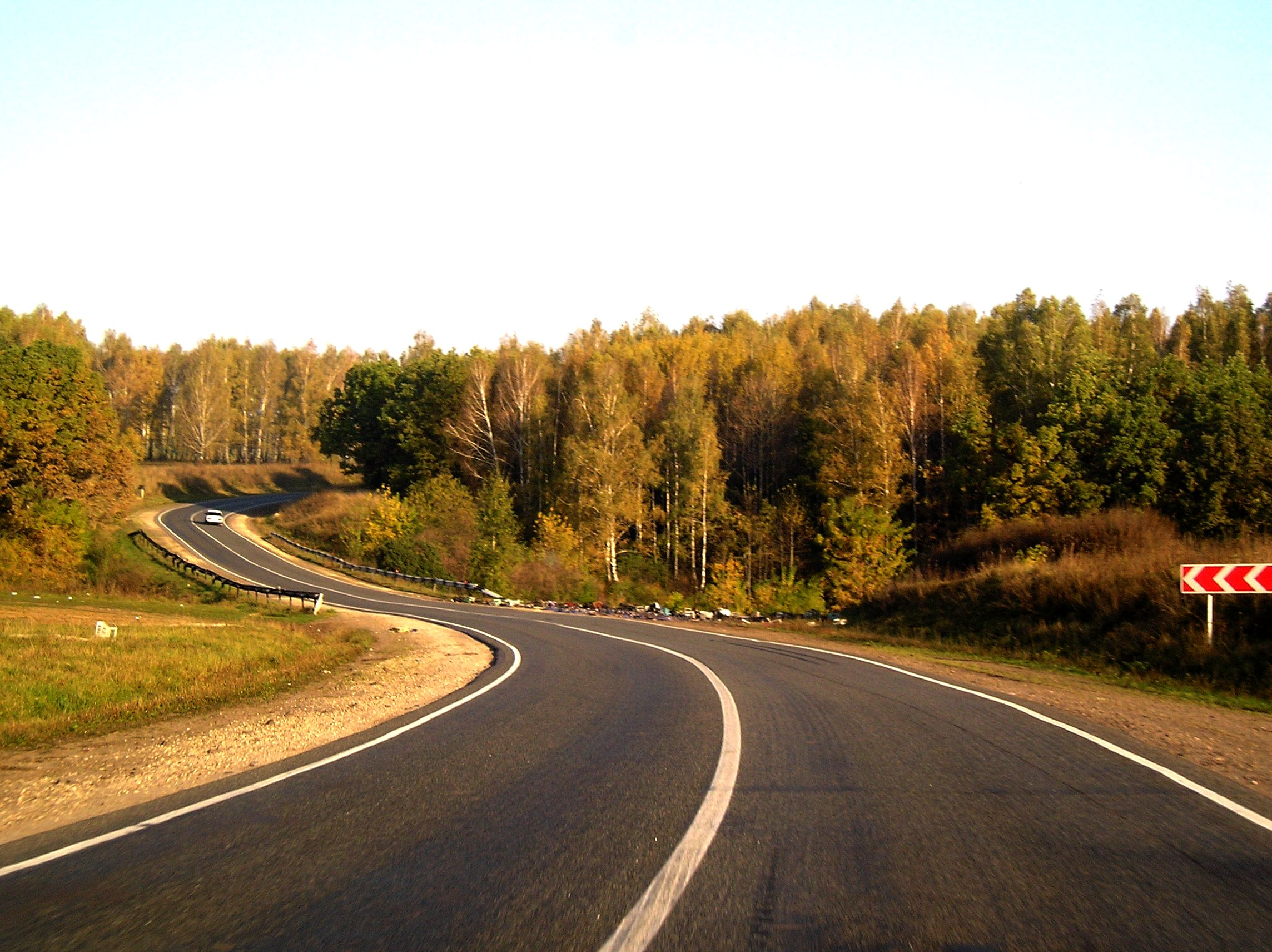
- E105 - Fatezhsky District

- Coat of arms
- Location of Fatezhsky District in Kursk Oblast
- Coordinates: 52°06′00″N 35°52′00″E
- Country: Russia
- Federal subject: Kursk Oblast
- Established: 1928
- Administrative center: Fatezh

Area
  - Total: 1,281 km^{2} (495 sq mi)

Population (2010 Census)
  - Total: 18,885
  - Density: 14.74/km^{2} (38.18/sq mi)
  - Urban: 28.6%
  - Rural: 71.4%

Administrative structure
  - Administrative divisions: 1 Towns of district significance, 21 Selsoviets
  - Inhabited localities: 1 cities/towns, 192 rural localities

Municipal structure
  - Municipally incorporated as: Fatezhsky Municipal District
  - Municipal divisions: 1 urban settlements, 10 rural settlements
- Time zone: UTC+3 (MSK)
- OKTMO ID: 38644000
- Website: http://fatezh-adm.ru/

Fatezhsky District (Russian: Фате́жский райо́н) is an administrative and municipal district (raion), one of the twenty-eight in Kursk Oblast, Russia. It is located in the northern part of the oblast. The area of the district is 1,281 square kilometers (495 sq mi). Its administrative center is the town of Fatezh. Population: 16,771 (2021 census); 18,885 (2010 census); 23,194 (2002 Census); 29,745 (1989 Soviet census). The population of Fatezh accounts for 28.0% of the district's total population.

== Geography ==
Fatezhsky District is located in the north of Kursk Oblast, on the border with Oryol Oblast to the north. The terrain is hilly plain averaging 200 meters above sea level; the district lies on the area of the Central Russian Upland. The main river in the district is the Svapa River, which flows south to the Seym River. The district is 30 km northeast of the city of Kursk, and 425 km southwest of Moscow. The area measures 45 km (north-south), and 35 km (west-east); total area is 1,290 km2 (4.3% of Kursk Oblast). The administrative center is the town of Fatezh.

The district is bordered on the north by Trosnyansky District of Oryol Oblast, on the east by Zolotukhinsky District, on the south by Kursky District, and on the west by Zheleznogorsky District.

== Towns and settlements ==
- 2nd Banino
- 2nd Gnezdilovo
