= Həsənqala =

Həsənqala or Gasankala may refer to:

- Həsənqala, Khachmaz, Azerbaijan
- Həsənqala, Qusar, Azerbaijan

== See also ==
- Həsənqaya (disambiguation)
