= Həsənqaya =

Həsənqaya or Gasankaya may refer to:

- Həsənqaya, Barda, Azerbaijan
- Həsənqaya, Tartar, Azerbaijan

== See also ==
- Həsənqala (disambiguation)
