= Bala-Kusary =

Bala-Kusary may refer to:

- Bala Qusar, Azerbaijan
- Bala Qusarqışlaq, Azerbaijan
