= List of places named after Vladimir Lenin =

This is a list of places which are named or renamed after Vladimir Ilyich Ulyanov, better known by his alias Lenin. Some or all of the locations in former Soviet republics and satellites were renamed (frequently reverting to pre-Soviet names) after the fall of the Soviet Union, while Russia and aligned countries (mainly Belarus) retained the names of the thousands of streets, avenues, squares, regions, towns, and cities that were given Lenin's name as part of his cult of personality.

== Cities, towns, settlements and districts ==
=== Former Soviet Union ===
==== Azerbaijan ====
- Ilyich (1924–1990) — Şərur, Nakhchivan Autonomous Republic
- Lenin, Leninkend, and Leninfeld — Çinarlı, Shamkir
- Leninabad — Kərimbəyli, Babek
- Leninabad — Yeni yol, Shamkir
- Leninabad — Sanqalan
- Leninabad — Təklə, Gobustan
- Leninavan — Həsənqaya, Tartar
- Leninkənd — Qarakeçdi
- Leninkend — Mustafabəyli
- Port-İliç — Lankaran Rayon, now called Liman
- Pamyat' Lenina — Balıqçılar

==== Armenia ====
- Leninakan (1924–1990) — Gyumri

==== Kazakhstan ====
- Leninsk (1958–1995) — Baikonur
- Leninogorsk (1941–2002) — Ridder

==== Kyrgyzstan ====
- Lenin (Leninskoye)
- Leninjol (1937–1991) — Masy
- Leninpol (?–2001) — Bakay-Ata

==== Moldova ====
- Lenin, Transnistria, a commune in Transnistria

==== Russia ====
- Leninaul, a town in Dagestan
- Leningori (1924?-1990) — Akhalgori/Leningor (from 1990), South Ossetia
- Leningrad (1924–1991) — St. Petersburg
- Leningrad Oblast, a federal subject
- Leninkent, a town in Dagestan
- Leninogorsk, Republic of Tatarstan, founded in 1948
- Leninsk, a town in Volgograd Oblast
- Leninsk, an urban-type settlement in Chelyabinsk Oblast
- Leningradsky, Chukotka Autonomous Okrug, an urban-type settlement in Chukotka Autonomous Okrug
- Leninsk (1918–1929) — Taldom, Moscow Oblast
- Leninsk-Kuznetsky, Kemerovo Oblast, known as Kolchugino before 1925
- Leninskaya Sloboda, a town in Nizhny Novgorod Oblast
- Gorki Leninskiye, Moscow Oblast, known as Gorki before 1924
- Leninskoye, a town in Kirov Oblast
- Leninskoye, a town in Leninsky District in Jewish Autonomous Oblast
- Leninsky, a town in Leninsky District in Tula Oblast
- Leninsky, a town in Yakutia
- Novo-Lenino, a district in Irkutsk
- Ulyanovsk, Russia — known as Simbirsk before 1924
- Leninsky District in several federal subjects (disambiguation page)

==== Tajikistan ====
- Leninabad (1936–1992) — Khujand
- Leningrad or Leningradskiy — Mu'minobod

==== Turkmenistan ====
- Leninsk (1924-1927) — Türkmenabat

==== Ukraine ====
- Illichivsk (1952–2016) — Chornomorsk, Odesa Oblast
- Lenin Raion, Sevastopol
- Lenine Raion, A Raion in Crimea
- Lenine, A city in Crimea

==== Uzbekistan ====
- Leninsk (1937-1991) — Asaka

=== Eastern Europe ===
==== Hungary ====
- Leninváros (1970–1991) — Tiszaújváros

== Streets and squares ==
Almost every town in the Soviet Union had a street named after Lenin. After the collapse of the Soviet Union, some of streets and squares (primarily outside of Russia and Belarus) reverted to their former names or were given new ones. In Russia, there are still 5,000 streets named after Lenin. This concerns also the names of city districts. Listed below are some of the streets named after Lenin, with an emphasis on those outside of the former USSR or its Eastern Bloc.

On 15 May 2015 President of Ukraine Petro Poroshenko signed a bill into law that started a six months period for the removal of communist monuments and the mandatory renaming of settlements and (the many) streets and squares with names related to the communist regime. Places in Crimea, the Donetsk People's Republic, and Luhansk People's Republic were not practically affected by this law due to their occupation by Russia.

=== Former Soviet Union ===
==== Armenia ====
- Lenini hraparak (Lenin Square) – now Independence Square, Gyumri
- Lenini hraparak (Lenin Square), 1940–1990 – now Republic Square, Yerevan
- Lenini poghota (Lenin Avenue), 1924–1990 – now Mashtots Avenue, Yerevan

==== Azerbaijan ====
- Lenin meydanı (Lenin Square) – now Azadliq Square, Baku

==== Belarus ====
- Lieninski praspiekt (Lenin's Avenue), 1961–1991 – now Independence Avenue, Minsk
- Vulica Lienina (Lenin Street), Brest
- Vulica Lienina (Lenin Street), Grodno
- Vulica Lienina (Lenin Street), Minsk
- Plošča Lienina (Lenin Square), Brest
- Plošča Lienina (Lenin Square, metro station), Minsk
- Praspiekt Lienina (Lenin Avenue), Gomel
- Praspiekt Lienina (Lenin Avenue), Zhodzina

==== Estonia ====
- Lenini prospekt (Lenin Prospekt), 1950–1994 – now Joala tänav, Narva
- Lenini puiestee (Lenin Avenue), ?–1991 – now Pikk tänav, Pärnu
- Lenini puiestee (Lenin Avenue), 1950–1991 – now Rävala puiestee, Tallinn
- V. I. Lenini puiestee (V. I. Lenin Avenue) – now Viru puiestee, Sillamäe
- Lenini tänav (Lenin Street), 1951–1990 – now Uus tänav, Kuressaare
- Lenini tänav (Lenin Street), ?–1989 – now Kesktänav, Põltsamaa
- Lenini tänav (Lenin Street), ?–1994 – Tapa
- Lenini tänav (Lenin Street), ?–1989 – now Kesktänav and Riia tänav, Valga
- Lenini tänav (Lenin Street), ?–1990 – now Jüri tänav, Võru
- Lenini väljak (Lenin Square), ?–1991 – now Riiamäe plats, Tartu
- V. I. Lenini tänav (V. I. Lenin Street), ?–1992 – now Jaama tänav, Jõhvi

==== Georgia ====
- Leninis Moedani (Lenin Square) – now Freedom Square, Tbilisi

==== Kazakhstan ====
- Prospekt Lenina (Lenin Avenue), 1919–1995 – now Dostyq Avenue, Almaty
- Prospekt Lenina (Lenin Avenue), Karaganda

==== Latvia ====
- Ļeņina iela (Lenin Street), 1950–1991 – now Brīvības iela, Riga
- Ļeņina prospekts (Lenin Avenue), 1960–1990 – now Lielā iela, Jelgava

==== Lithuania ====
- Lenino aikšte (Lenin Square), 1952–1991 – now Lukiškės Square, Vilnius
- Lenino prospektas (Lenin Avenue), ?–1989 – now Vytauto prospektas, Kaunas
- Lenino prospektas (Lenin Avenue), 1961–1989 – now Gediminas Avenue, Vilnius

==== Moldova ====
- Strada Lenin (Lenin Street), 1944–1952 and Bulevardul Lenin (Lenin Boulevard), 1952–1990 – now Bulevardul Ștefan cel Mare și Sfînt, Chișinău
- Strada Lenin (Lenin Street), Comrat

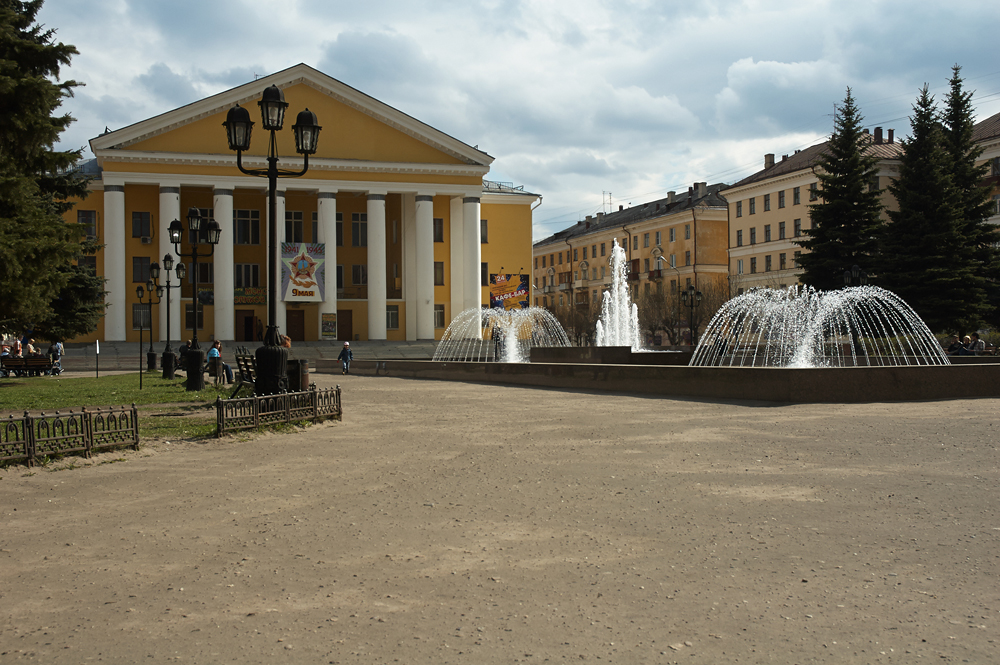
The House of Culture in Elektrostal, along Prospekt Lenina

==== Russia ====
- Leninskaya Ploshchad (Lenin Square) – now Paveletskaya Ploshchad, Moscow
- Ploshchad Lenina (Lenin Square), Arkhangelsk
- Ploshchad Lenina (Lenin Square), Nizhny Novgorod
- Ploshchad Lenina (Lenin Square), Novosibirsk
- Ploshchad Lenina (Lenin Square), Saint Petersburg
- Leninsky Prospekt (Lenin Avenue), Moscow
- Prospekt Lenina (Lenin Avenue), Elektrostal
- Prospekt Lenina (Lenin Avenue), Murmansk
- Prospekt Lenina (Lenin Avenue), Nizhny Novgorod
- Prospekt Lenina (Lenin Avenue), Volgograd
- Prospekt Lenina (Lenin Avenue), Yekaterinburg
- Lenina ulitsa (Lenin Street) – now Kremlinskaya Ulitsa, Kazan
- Lenina ulitsa (Lenin Street), Pechory
- Lenina ulitsa (Lenin Street), Saint Petersburg
- Leninskaya Ulitsa (Lenin Street), Samara
- Ulitsa Lenina (Lenin Street), Astrakhan
- Ulitsa Lenina (Lenin Street), Perm
- Ulitsa Lenina (Lenin Street), Novosibirsk

==== Tajikistan ====
- Prospekt Lenina (Lenin Avenue), 1961–1992 – now Rudaki Avenue, Dushanbe

==== Ukraine ====
- Ploshcha Lenina (Площа Леніна, Lenin Square), Donetsk
- Prospekt Lenina (Проспект Леніна, Lenin Avenue), Alchevsk
- Prospekt Lenina (Lenin Avenue), 1959–1990 – now Svobody Prospekt, Lviv
- Prospekt Lenina (Lenin Avenue), 1960–2016 – now Prospekt Miru, Mariupol
- Poshcha Lenina (Lenin Square), ?-2014, 2022-now, changed to "Freedom Square" it was reversed in 2022, Mariupol
- Prospekt Lenina (Lenin Avenue), 1960–2016 – now Tsentralnyi Prospekt, Mykolaiv
- Prospekt Lenina (Lenin Avenue), ?–2016 – now Sobornyi Prospekt, Oleksandriia
- Prospekt Lenina (Lenin Avenue), 1952–2016 – now Sobornyi Prospekt, Zaporizhia
- Vulytsya Lenina (Вулиця Леніна, Lenin Street) – now Vulytsya Yevheniya Kharchenka, Kyiv
- Vulytsya Lenina (Lenin Street), ?–1994 – now Vulytsya Rishelievska, Odesa

==== Uzbekistan ====
- V.I. Lenin nomidagi maydon (V.I. Lenin Square), 1956–1991 – now Mustaqillik Maydoni, Tashkent

=== Eastern Europe ===
==== Bulgaria ====
- Bulevard V.I. Lenin (Lenin Boulevard) – now Tsarigradsko shose, Sofia
- Ploshtad Lenin (Lenin Square) – now Ploshtad Sveta Nedelya, Sofia

==== Czechoslovakia ====
- Leninova ulice (Lenin Street) — now Evropská třída, Prague
- Leninova ulice (Lenin Street) — now Kounicova ul., Brno
- Leninova ulice (Lenin Street) — now Klišská ul., Ústí nad Labem
- Leninova ulice (Lenin Street) — now ul. Palackého, Plzeň
- Leninova ulice (Lenin Street) — now ul. E. Beneše, Písek
- Leninova ulice (Lenin Street) – now Nádražní, Krnov
- Leninovo nábrežie (Lenin riverbank) — now Nábrežie Jána Pavla II., Poprad
- Ulica V. I. Lenina (V. I. Lenin Street) — now Sadová, Šoporňa
- Leninova (Lenin (metro station)) – now Dejvická, Prague
- Leninova (Lenin Street) – now Hlavná ulica, Košice

==== Hungary ====
- Lenin körút (Lenin boulevard) – now Tisza Lajos körút, Szeged
- Lenin körút (Lenin boulevard) – now Erzsébet körút and Teréz körút, Budapest
- Lenin tér (Lenin square) – now Hatvani kapu tér, Eger

==== Poland ====
- Aleja Lenina (Lenin Avenue) – now Aleja Henryka, Chrzanów
- Aleja Lenina (Lenin Avenue) – now Aleja Jana Pawła II, Częstochowa
- Aleja Lenina (Lenin Avenue) – now Ulica Chorzowska, Świętochłowice
- Ulica Lenina (Lenin Street), 1949–1990 – now Ulica Jana Klemensa Branickiego, Białystok
- Ulica Lenina (Lenin Street) – now Ulica Andersa, Tychy
- Ulica Lenina (Lenin Street) – now Ulica Brata Alberta, Warsaw
- Aleja Włodzimierza Lenina (Vladimir Lenin Avenue), 1958–1991 – now Aleja Solidarności, Kraków
- Aleja Włodzimierza Lenina (Vladimir Lenin Avenue) – now Aleja Mieczysława Smorawińskiego and Aleja Generała Władysława Andersa, Lublin
- Ulica Włodzimierza Lenina (Vladimir Lenin Street) – now Ulica Henryka Le Ronda, Katowice
- Ulica Włodzimierza Lenina (Vladimir Lenin Street) – now Ulica Armii Krajowej, Kołobrzeg
- Ulica Włodzimierza Lenina (Vladimir Lenin Street) – now Ulica Stróżowska, Sanok

==== Romania ====
- Strada V.I. Lenin (V.I. Lenin Street) – now Strada Revoluției, Târgu Mureş
- Bulevardul Lenin (Lenin Boulevard) - now Bulevardul 21 Decembrie 1989, Cluj-Napoca
- Strada V.I. Lenin (V.I. Lenin Street) – now Strada Mihai Eminescu, Timișoara

==== Slovakia ====
- Leninová (Lenin Street), Veľké Úľany
- V.I. Lenina (V.I. Lenin Street), Šoporňa
- Leninová (Lenin Street), Bušince

=== Western Europe ===
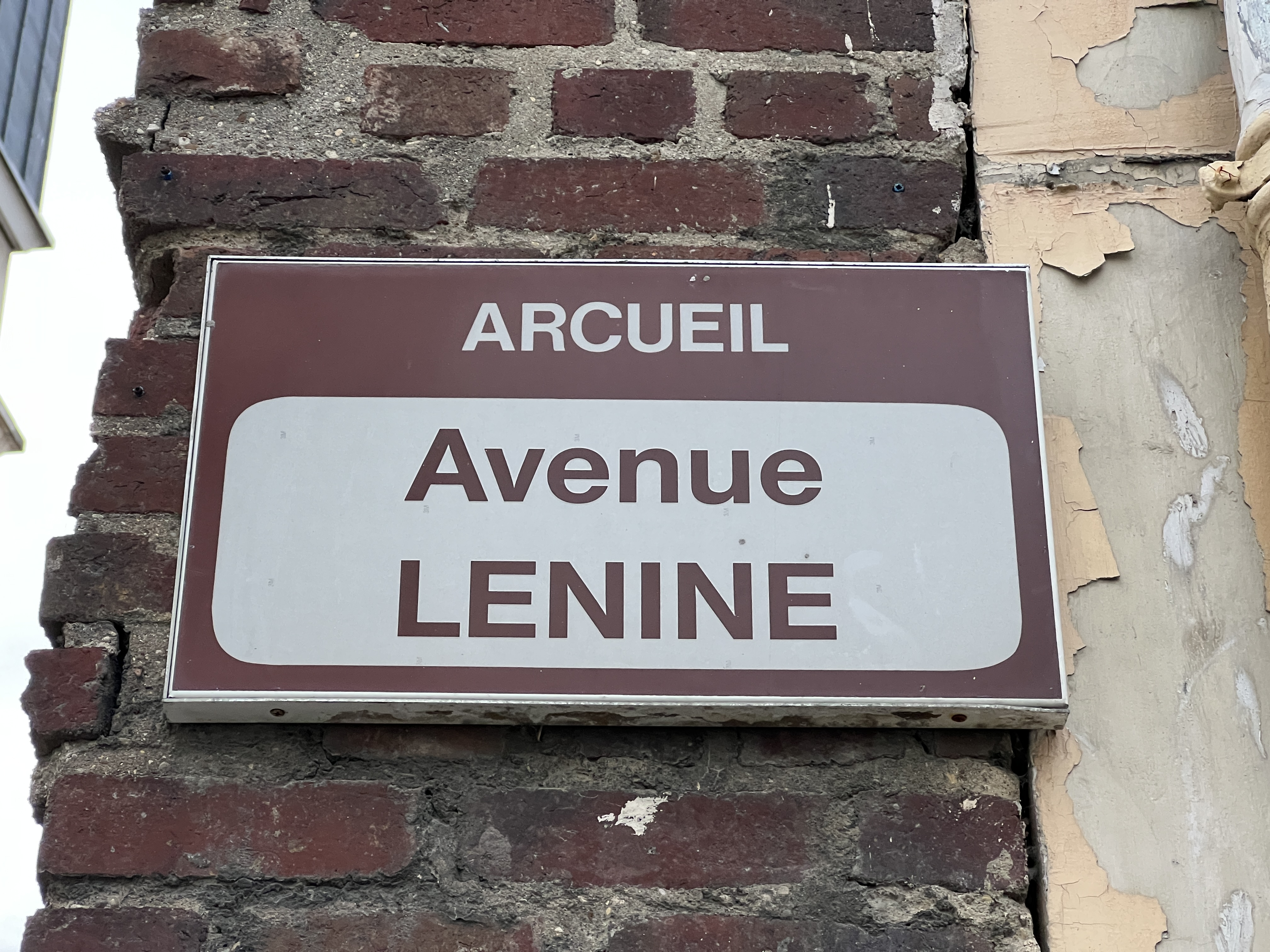
A street sign marking Avenue Lénine in Arcueil

==== France ====
- Avenue Lénine (Lenin Avenue), Achères, Yvelines
- Avenue Lénine (Lenin Avenue), Bègles
- Avenue Lénine (Lenin Avenue), Fontaine
- Avenue Lénine (Lenin Avenue), Gentilly
- Avenue Lénine (Lenin Avenue), Gonfreville-l'Orcher
- Avenue Lénine (Lenin Avenue), Lanester
- Avenue Lénine (Lenin Avenue), Pierrefitte-sur-Seine
- Avenue Lénine (Lenin Avenue), Romainville
- Avenue Lénine (Lenin Avenue), Saint-Denis
- Avenue Lénine (Lenin Avenue), Saint-Pierre-des-Corps
- Avenue Lénine (Lenin Avenue), Villejuif
- Avenue Vladimir Illitch Lénine (Lenin Avenue), Nanterre
- Avenue Vladimir Illitch Lenine (Vladimir Ilich Lenin Avenue), Arcueil
- Avenue Vladimir Illitch Oulianov Lénine (Lenin Avenue), Lorient
- Boulevard Lénine (Lenin Boulevard), Argenteuil
- Boulevard Lénine (Lenin Boulevard), Bobigny
- Boulevard Lénine (Lenin Boulevard), Eymoutiers
- Boulevard Lénine (Lenin Boulevard), Saint-Étienne-du-Rouvray
- Boulevard Lénine (Lenin Boulevard), Tremblay-en-France
- Boulevard Lénine (Lenin Boulevard), Vénissieux
- Passerelle Lénine (Lenin footbridge), Bègles
- Passerelle Lénine (Lenin footbridge), Alès
- Place Lénine (Lenin Square), Bègles
- Place Lénine (Lenin Square), Bezons
- Place Lénine, Champigny-sur-Marne / France
- Place Lénine, Saint-Junien / France
- Rue Lénine (Lenin Street), Bagnolet
- Rue Lénine (Lenin Street), Blainville-sur-Orne
- Rue Lénine (Lenin Street), Fenain
- Rue Lénine (Lenin Street), Ivry-sur-Seine
- Rue Lénine (Lenin Street), L'Île-Saint-Denis
- Rue Lénine (Lenin Street), La Courneuve
- Rue Lénine (Lenin Street), Longueau
- Rue Lénine (Lenin Street), Montataire
- Rue Lénine (Lenin Street), Montigny-en-Gohelle
- Rue Lénine (Lenin Street), Nauroy
- Rue Lénine (Lenin Street), Neuf-Mesnil
- Rue Lénine (Lenin Street), Persan
- Rue Lénine (Lenin Street), Petite-Forêt
- Rue Lénine (Lenin Street), Portes-lès-Valence
- Rue Lénine (Lenin Street), Saint-Cyr-l'École
- Rue Lénine (Lenin Street), Saint-Martin-d'Hères
- Rue Lénine (Lenin Street), Somain
- Rue Lénine (Lenin Street), Thenon
- Rue Lénine (Lenin Street), Unieux
- Rue Lénine (Lenin Street), Vierzon
- Rue Lénine (Lenin Street), Viry-Châtillon
- Cité Lénine (Housing project), 68 av de la République, Aubervilliers, Seine-Saint-Denis, Paris

==== Finland ====
- Lenininpuisto (Lenin Park), Helsinki

==== Germany ====
- Leninallee (Lenin Avenue) – now Landsberger Allee, Berlin
- Leninallee (Lenin Avenue), Cottbus
- Leninallee (Lenin Avenue) – now Lindenallee, Eisenhüttenstadt
- Leninallee (Lenin Avenue) – now Am grünen Tal, Schwerin
- Leninallee (Lenin Avenue) – now Zeppelinstraße, Potsdam
- Leninallee (Lenin Avenue) – now Merseburger Straße, Halle
- Leninallee (Lenin Avenue) – now Talstraße, Meissen
- Leninallee (Lenin Avenue), Stendal
- Leninplatz (Lenin Square) – now Platz der Vereinten Nationen (United Nations Square), Berlin
- Leninplatz (Lenin Square) – now Wiener Platz (Vienna Square), Dresden
- Leninplatz (Lenin Square), Borne, Saxony-Anhalt
- Leninplatz (Lenin Square), Bützow
- Leninplatz (Lenin Square), Edderitz
- Leninplatz (Lenin Square), Ostrau (Petersberg, Saxony-Anhalt)
- Leninplatz (Lenin Square), Falkensee
- Leninplatz (Lenin Square), Könnern
- Leninstraße (Lenin Street) – now Prager Straße (Prague Street), Leipzig
- Leninstraße (Lenin Street), Weißenfels, Saxony-Anhalt
- Leninstraße (Lenin Street), Etgersleben
- Leninstraße (Lenin Street), Premnitz
- Leninstraße (Lenin Street), Saubach
- Leninstraße (Lenin Street), Teutschenthal
- Leninstraße (Lenin Street), Zschornewitz

==== Italy ====
- Via Lenin (Lenin Street), Bibbiano, Reggio Emilia
- Piazza Lenin (Lenin Square), Cavriago
- Piazza Lenin (Lenin Square), Scicli
- Via Lenin (Lenin Street), Capraia e Limite
- Via Lenin (Lenin Street), Castiglione del Lago
- Via Lenin (Lenin Street), Caorso, Piacenza
- Via Lenin (Lenin Street), Chiusi
- Via Lenin (Lenin Street), Castelvetro di Modena
- Via Lenin (Lenin Street), Carpi
- Via Lenin (Lenin Street), Concordia sulla Secchia, Modena
- Via Lenin (Lenin Street), Cosenza
- Via Lenin (Lenin Street), Ferrara
- Via Lenin (Lenin Street), Garlasco, Pavia
- Via Lenin (Lenin Street), Lecce
- Via Lenin (Lenin Street), Lula
- Via Lenin (Lenin Street), Marsciano
- Via Lenin (Lenin Street), Mede, Pavia
- Via Lenin (Lenin Street), Melendugno, Lecce
- Via Lenin (Lenin Street), Modena
- Via Lenin (Lenin Street), Monticelli d'Ongina, Piacenza
- Via Lenin (Lenin Street), Misterbianco, Catania
- Via Lenin (Lenin Street), Monsummano Terme, Pistoia
- Via Lenin (Lenin Street), Panicale
- Via Lenin (Lenin Street), Paullo
- Via Lenin (Lenin Street), Pisa
- Via Lenin (Lenin Street), Quattro Castella, Reggio Emilia
- Via Lenin (Lenin Street), Rome
- Via Lenin (Lenin Street), San Giuliano Terme, Pisa
- Via Lenin (Lenin Street), San Polo d'Enza, Reggio Emilia
- Via Lenin (Lenin Street), San Stino di Livenza, Venezia
- Via Lenin (Lenin Street), Spoleto
- Via Lenin (Lenin Street), Zibido San Giacomo, Milan
- Viale Lenin (Lenin Avenue), Bologna
- Viale Lenin (Lenin Avenue), Castel Volturno
- Viale Lenin (Lenin Avenue), Genzano di Roma
- Viale Lenin (Lenin Avenue), Palma di Montechiaro
- Viale Lenin (Lenin Avenue), Suzzara

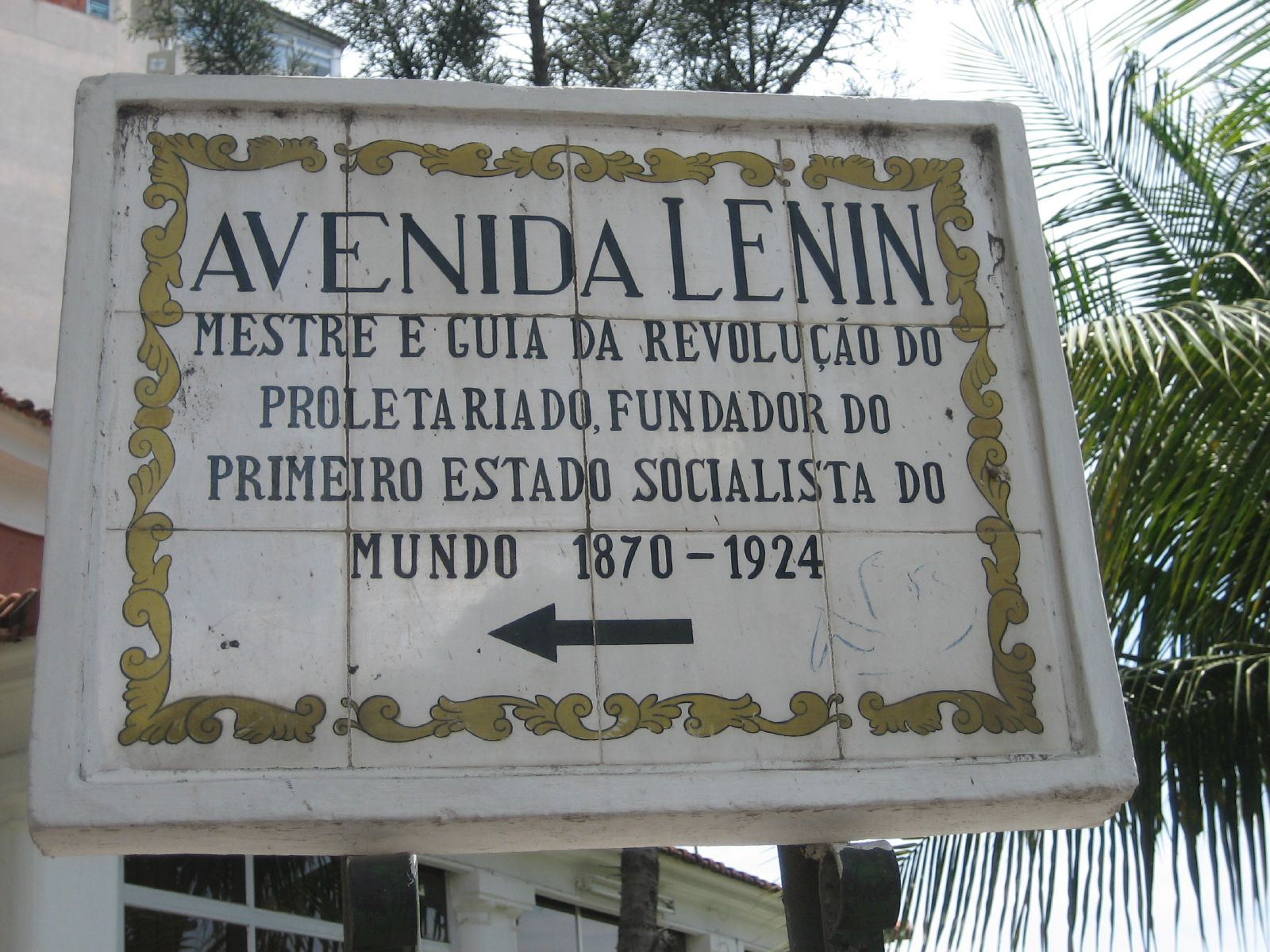
"Master and Guide of the Revolution of the proletariat, the founder of the first socialist state in the world." Lenin Avenue in Luanda.

==== United Kingdom ====
- Lenin Terrace, Chopwell / England
- Lenin Terrace, Stanley / England
- Bevin Court, London, England, was originally intended be called Lenin Court. However, two letters of the building's sign were replaced to rename it after Ernest Bevin who died between its completion and inauguration. A bust of Lenin in the grounds was left in place, but was eventually removed after having been repeatedly vandalised by anti-communists.

=== Southeastern Europe ===
==== Montenegro ====
- Bulevar Lenjina (Lenin Boulevard), 1948–1991 – now Bulevar Svetog Petra Cetinjski, Podgorica
- Bulevar Lenjina, Cetinje

==== Serbia ====
- Bulevar Lenjina (Lenin Boulevard), 1948–1997 – now Bulevar Mihaila Pupina, New Belgrade
- Bulevar Lenjina (or Lenjinova ulica) - now Bulevar (ulica) Kralja Petra I, Smederevska Palanka
- Bulevar Lenjina, now Bulevar Nemanjića, Niš
- Bulevar Lenjina, Loznica

=== Africa ===
==== Angola ====
- Avenida Lenin (Lenin Avenue), Luanda

==== Benin ====
- Place Lenin (Lenin Square), Cotonou

==== Mozambique ====
- Avenida Vladimir Lenine (Vladimir Lenin Avenue), Maputo

==== South Africa ====
- Lenin Street, Alberton

==== Somalia ====
- Via Lenin (Lenin Street), Mogadishu

==== Tunisia ====
- Rue Lénine (Lenin Street), Tunis

=== Asia ===
==== India ====
- Lenin Sarani (Lenin Street), Kolkata
- Lenin Street, Kolkata
- Lenin Street, Erode
- Lenin Street, Chennai
- Lenin Street, Pondicherry, Puducherry
- Lenin Centre, Vijayawada, Andhra Pradesh
- Lenin Chowk, Muzaffarpur

==== Malaysia ====
- Lenin River, a river in the interior of Sarawak

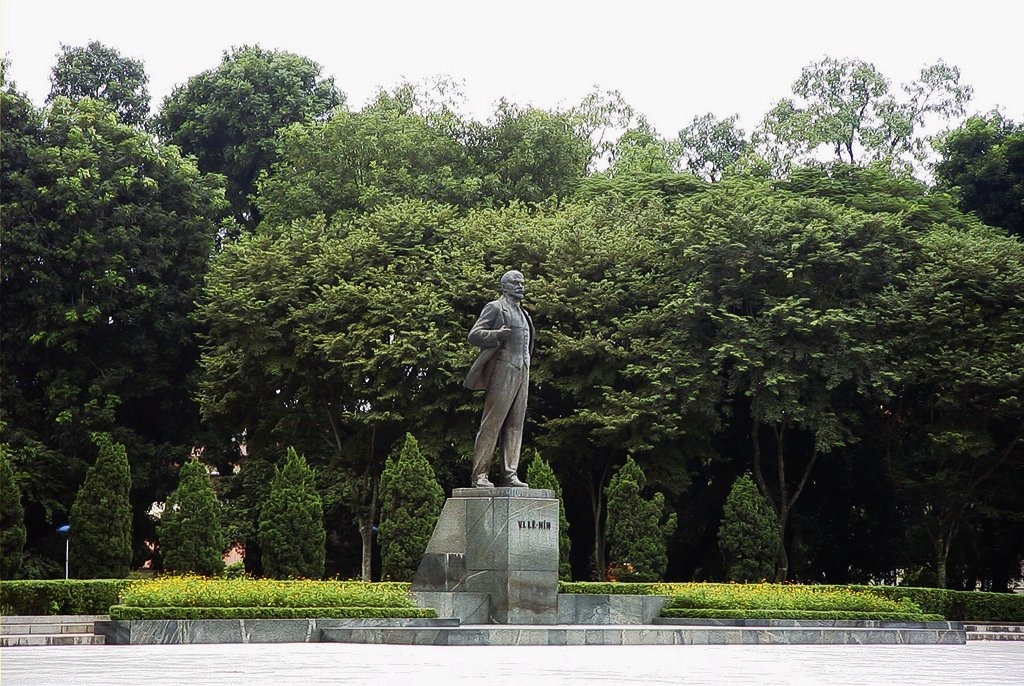
A statue of Lenin in Lenin Flower Garden

==== Vietnam ====
- Lenin Park, Hanoi
- Suối Lenin (Lenin Stream), Pắc Bó, Cao Bằng

== Places and parks ==
=== Eastern Europe ===
==== Azerbaijan ====
- Lenin rayonu (Lenin city district), Baku

==== Belarus ====
- Leninskiy rayon (Ленинский район ~ Lenin city district), Minsk

==== Czech Republic ====
- Závody V. I. Lenina (V. I. Lenin Works) – now Škoda Plzeň, Plzeň
- Muzeum V. I. Lenina (V. I. Lenin Museum) – now Lidový dům ČSSD (People's House of ČSSD), Prague

==== Estonia ====
- Lenini rajoon (Lenin city district), Tallinn - later Lõunarajoon (Southern district), now restructured

==== Russia ====
- Leninskiye gory (Ленинские горы ~ Lenin Hills) – now reverted to their historic name Sparrow Hills (Воробьевы горы), Moscow / Russia
- Leninskiy rayon (Ленинский район ~ Lenin city district) in the following cities;
  - Astrakhan
  - Barnaul
  - Cheboksary
  - Chelyabinsk
  - Grozny
  - Irkutsk
  - Ivanovo
  - Izhevsk
  - Kaluga
  - Kemerovo
  - Kirov
  - Komsomolsk-na-Amure
  - Krasnoyarsk
  - Magnitogorsk
  - Makhachkala
  - Murmansk
  - Nizhniy Novgorod
  - Nizhniy Tagil
  - Novosibirsk
  - Omsk
  - Orenburg
  - Orsk
  - Penza
  - Perm
  - Rostov-na-Donu
  - Samara
  - Saransk
  - Saratov
  - Smolensk
  - Stavropol
  - Tambov
  - Tomsk
  - Tyumen
  - Ufa
  - Ulyanovsk
  - Vladimir
  - Vladivostok
  - Voronezh
  - Yaroslavl
  - Yekaterinburg

==== Tajikistan ====
- Lenin Peak, – now Avicenna Peak

==== Romania ====
- Raionul Lenin (Lenin city district), Bucharest

==== Ukraine ====
- V.I. Lenin Memorial Chernobyl Nuclear Power Station (Chernobyl Nuclear Power Plant), Pripyat

=== Central America/Caribbean ===
==== Cuba ====
- Parque Lenin, Havana / Cuba

== Other ==
A large number of enterprises and other objects in the former Soviet Union and other countries of the Soviet bloc were named after Lenin: for example, the nuclear-powered icebreaker Lenin and Lenin Stadiums in many towns and cities. Additionally, every reasonably large settlement had a Lenin Street or Lenin Avenue ("Prospekt Lenina/Leninsky Prospekt"), or a Lenin Square.

== See also ==
- Leninsky Prospekt
- List of places named after Joseph Stalin
- List of statues of Joseph Stalin
- List of statues of Vladimir Lenin
- Lenin's Mausoleum
- List of renamed cities and towns in Russia
- List of things named after Fidel Castro
