= Leninkənd =

Leninkənd or Leninkend may refer to:

- Leninkənd, Lachin, Azerbaijan
- Mustafabəyli, Azerbaijan, formerly called Leninkənd
- Çinarlı, Shamkir, Azerbaijan, also called Leninkend
