= Leninsky Avenue =

Leninsky Avenue (Russian: Ленинский проспект, Leninsky prospekt) or Lenin Avenue (проспект Ленина, Prospekt Lenina) was a common name for major avenues in many cities of the former Soviet Union commemorating Vladimir Lenin. As of 2020, there were about 20 Leninsky Avenues and over 100 Lenin Avenues in Russia.

Notable avenues include:

- In Russia
  - Leninsky Avenue, an avenue in Moscow.
  - Leninsky Avenue, an avenue in Saint Petersburg.
  - Leninsky Avenue, an avenue in Voronezh.
  - Lenin Avenue, an avenue in Vyborg
  - Lenin Avenue, an avenue in Yekaterinburg.
- In Ukraine
  - Leninsky Avenue, an avenue in Donetsk.
  - Lenin Avenue, Yevpatoria, an avenue in Yevpatoria.
  - Lenin Avenue was the 1959−1990 name of the Liberty Avenue in Lviv.
  - Lenin Avenue was the 1960−2016 name of the Central Avenue in Mykolaiv.
  - Lenin Avenue was the 1952−2016 name of the Cathedral Avenue in Zaporizhzhia.
- In other countries
  - Lenin Avenue, was a main avenue in Gomel.
  - Leninsky Avenue was the 1961−1991 name of the Independence Avenue in Minsk.
  - Leninsky Avenue was the 1967−1997 name of the Abul Khair Khan Avenue in Aktobe.
  - Lenin Avenue was the Soviet-times name of the Dostyq Avenue in Almaty.
  - Lenin Avenue was the pre-1992 name of the Rudaki Avenue in Dushanbe.
  - Lenin Avenue was the Soviet-times name of the Mashtots Avenue in Yerevan.
  - Lenin Avenue was the Soviet-times name of the Gediminas Avenue in Vilnius.
  - Lenin Avenue was the Soviet-times name of the Stephen the Great Boulevard in Chișinău.

Several train and metro stations are named Leninsky Avenue or Lenin Avenue:

- Leninsky Prospekt (Moscow Metro), a metro station in Moscow.
- Leninsky Prospekt (Saint Petersburg Metro), a metro station in Saint Petersburg.

== See also ==
- Lenin Street, Novosibirsk
- Leninsky (disambiguation)
- Lenin Square (disambiguation)
- List of places named after Vladimir Lenin
