= D. F. Belyaev Townhouse =

Historic building located in the center of Moscow, Russia

Town estate of D. F. Belyaev
- Городская усадьба Д. Ф. Беляева
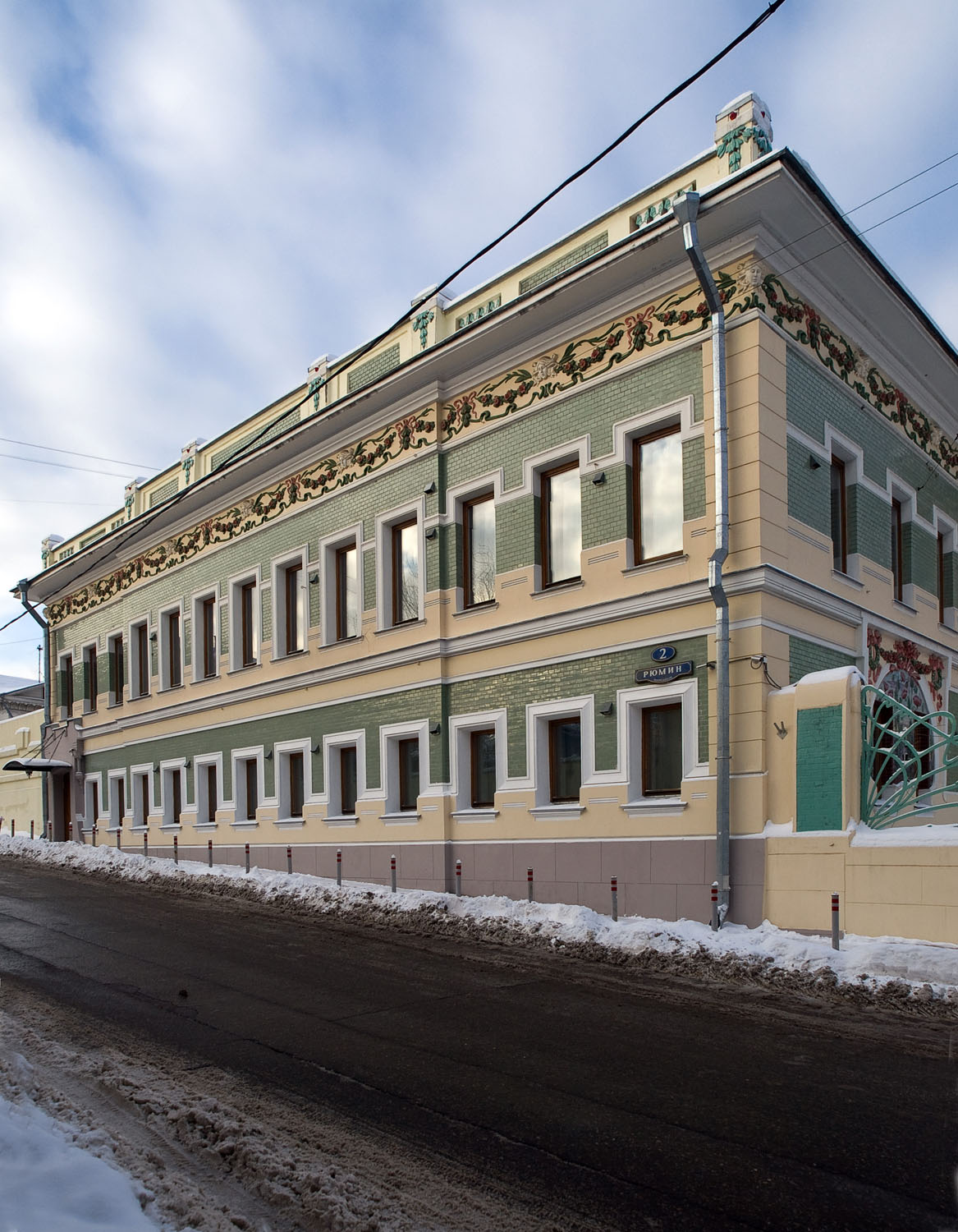
- Location: Moscow, Ryumin lane, house 2
- Coordinates: 55.7459°N 37.6470°E
- Designer: A. A. Galetskiy

The D. F. Belyaev Townhouse (Russian: Городская усадьба Д. Ф. Беляева) is a building located in the center of Moscow (Ryumin lane, house 2). It was rebuilt from an older building in 1903 according to the project of architect A. A. Galetskiy, by request of the haberdasher, hereditary honorary citizen of Moscow, Dmitry Fyodorovich Belyaev. The building has the status of an identified cultural heritage site.

== Architecture ==
The two-story mansion is built in the Art Nouveau style. The facade of the house is faced with gray-green ceramic tiles. Two rows of windows are treated with horizontal traction. A central avant-corps slightly protrudes, and it is crowned with a solid attic. To the left is the main entrance with a hinged metal canopy. On each side of the entrance opening there are small columns on the brackets. The facade from the garden is decorated with a mosaic panel in a curved semi-elliptical frame, called "Poppies at sunset".

Of particular interest to connoisseurs of Moscow modernism is the metal fence of the mansion on the side of the alley and the gate in the garden. This fence may have been made by the architect Alexander A. Galetsky himself, or, according to one version, was executed according to one of the unknown drawings of F.O. Schechtel. The fence has an unusual expressive design, presumably inspired by the works of the Belgian architect Victor Horta, in particular, "the blow of the scourge". The interior of the building features the original stucco ceilings and some other decorative elements.
