= Lernahovit =

Lernahovit may refer to:

- Lernahovit, Lori, Armenia
- Lernahovit, Gegharkunik, Armenia
- Lernahovit, Kashatagh Region, Nagarno-Karabakh
