= Taynitsky Garden =

Garden in Moscow, Russia

Coordinates: 55°45′1″N 37°37′14″E

Taynitsky Garden (Russian: Тайницкий сад) is an urban park located within the walls of the Moscow Kremlin, in Russia. The park is named after the Taynitskaya Tower in the Kremlin Wall, and is part of the portion of the Kremlin which is a UNESCO World Heritage Site.

== History ==
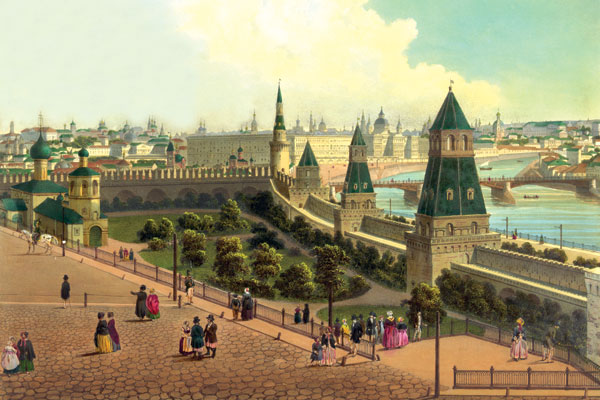
19th century depiction of the Taynitsky Garden.

During the time of the Russian Empire, the location of the Taynitsky Garden was occupied by a church to Saints Constantine and Helena, dating from the late 14th century. It also housed a granary associated with the Cathedral of the Annunciation. On a hill in the area, a monument to Tsar Alexander II was erected in 1898. Following the 1917 Russian Revolution, the church was among the historic buildings within the Kremlin ordered to be destroyed by Bolsheviks as part of the state atheism campaign to raze religious structures throughout Russia. The area became a public garden, with the upper portion, bordering Ivanovskaya Square called the Grand Kremlin Public Garden. The garden was the location of the first Subbotnik, or voluntary labor program, in which Lenin publicly participated.

One highlight of this garden is an oak tree named Cosmos, planted by Yuri Gagarin on April 14, 1961, just two days after his return from his historic space flight.

From 1967 to 1995, the area contained a garden with a seated monument to Lenin, opened to commemorate the 50th anniversary of the October Revolution. The statue was removed in 1995 and is now at the Gorki Leninskiye museum.

Archaeological investigations at Taynitsky Garden in 2007 uncovered the foundations of ancient houses and artifacts from everyday medieval life.

During a state visit to Russia in 2008 Libyan leader Muammar Gaddafi lived on a tent set up in the Taynitsky garden.

In 2013, a helipad was constructed for the use of Vladimir Putin. This is to help minimize disruption and congestion on Moscow roads caused by motorcades.

== Gallery ==
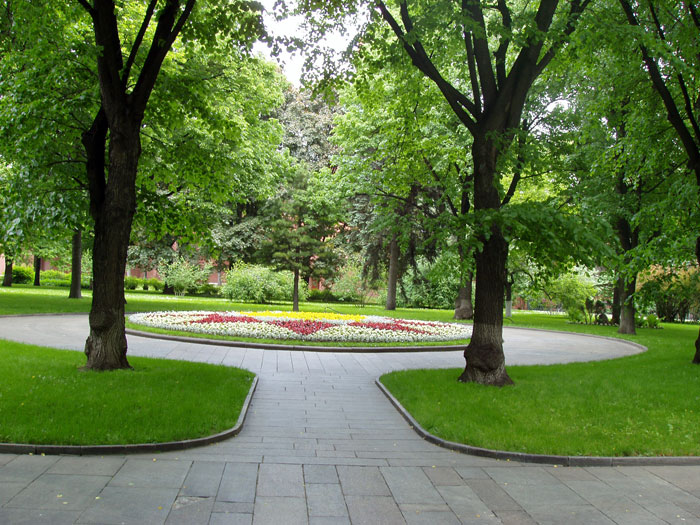

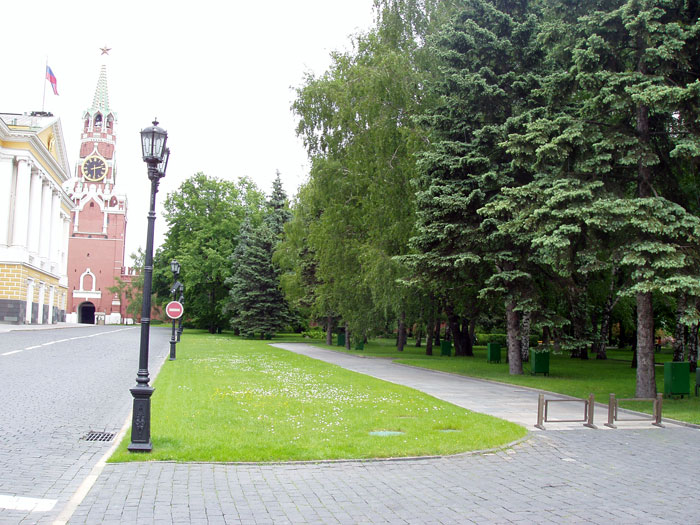

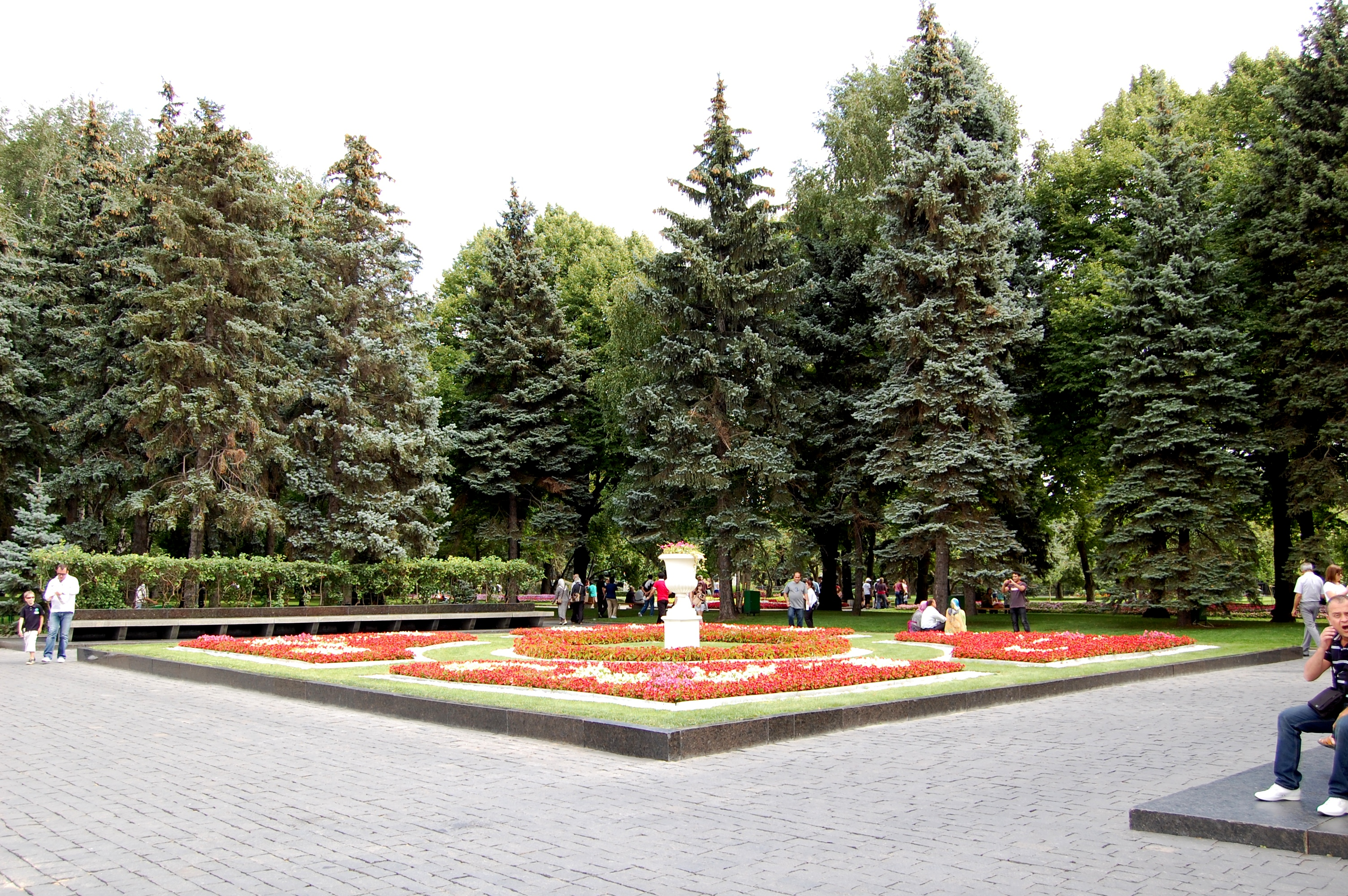

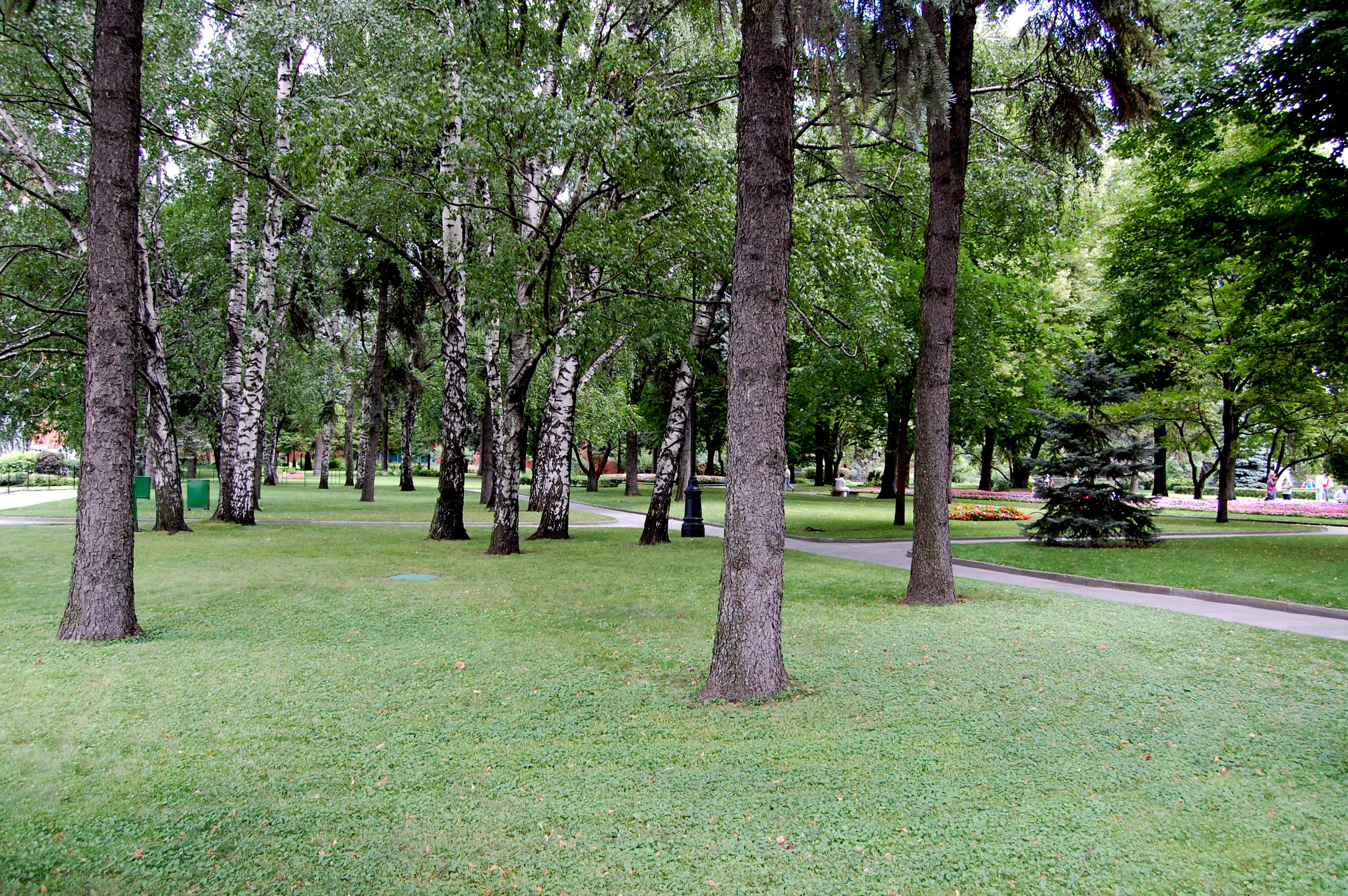

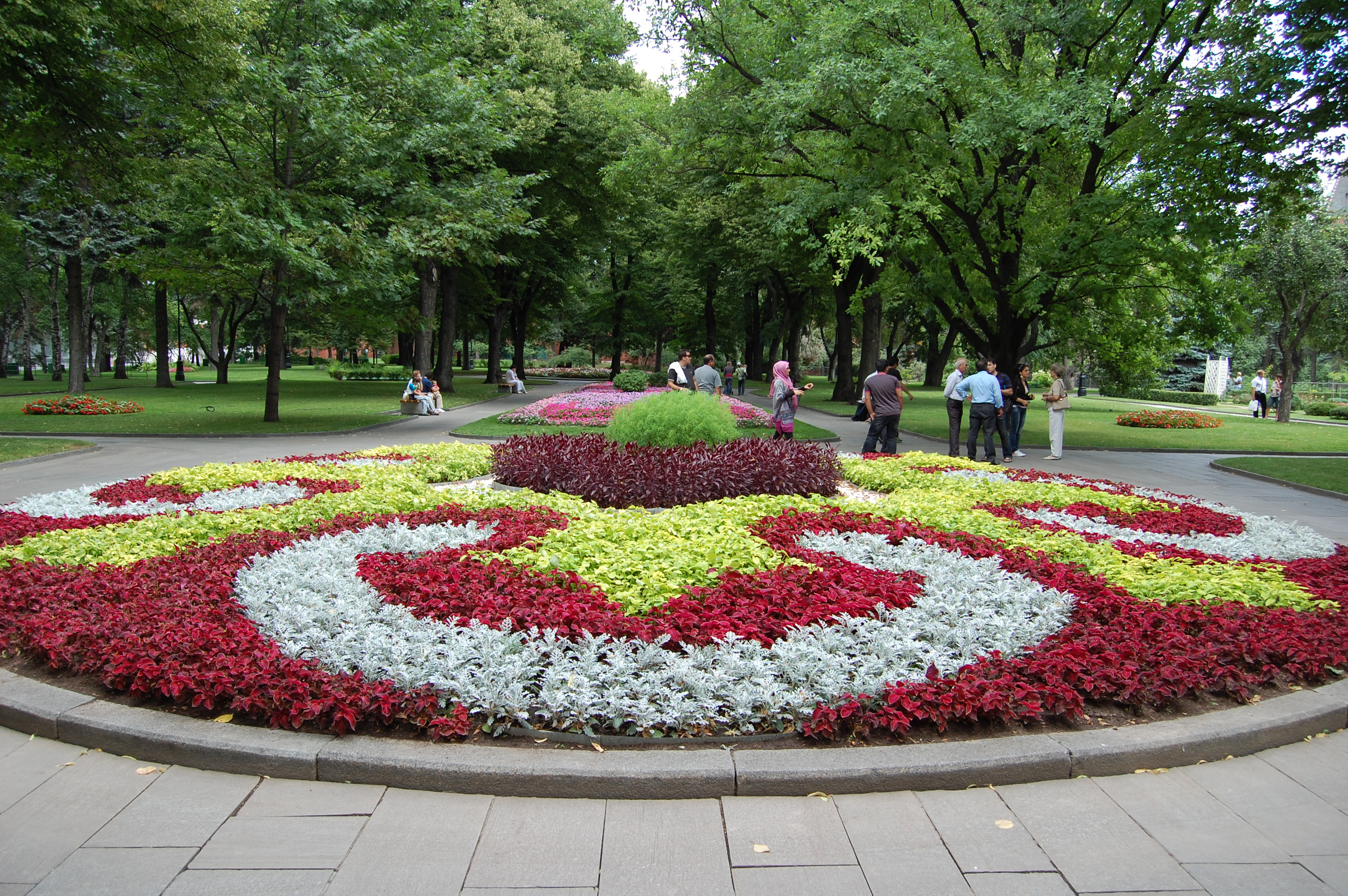

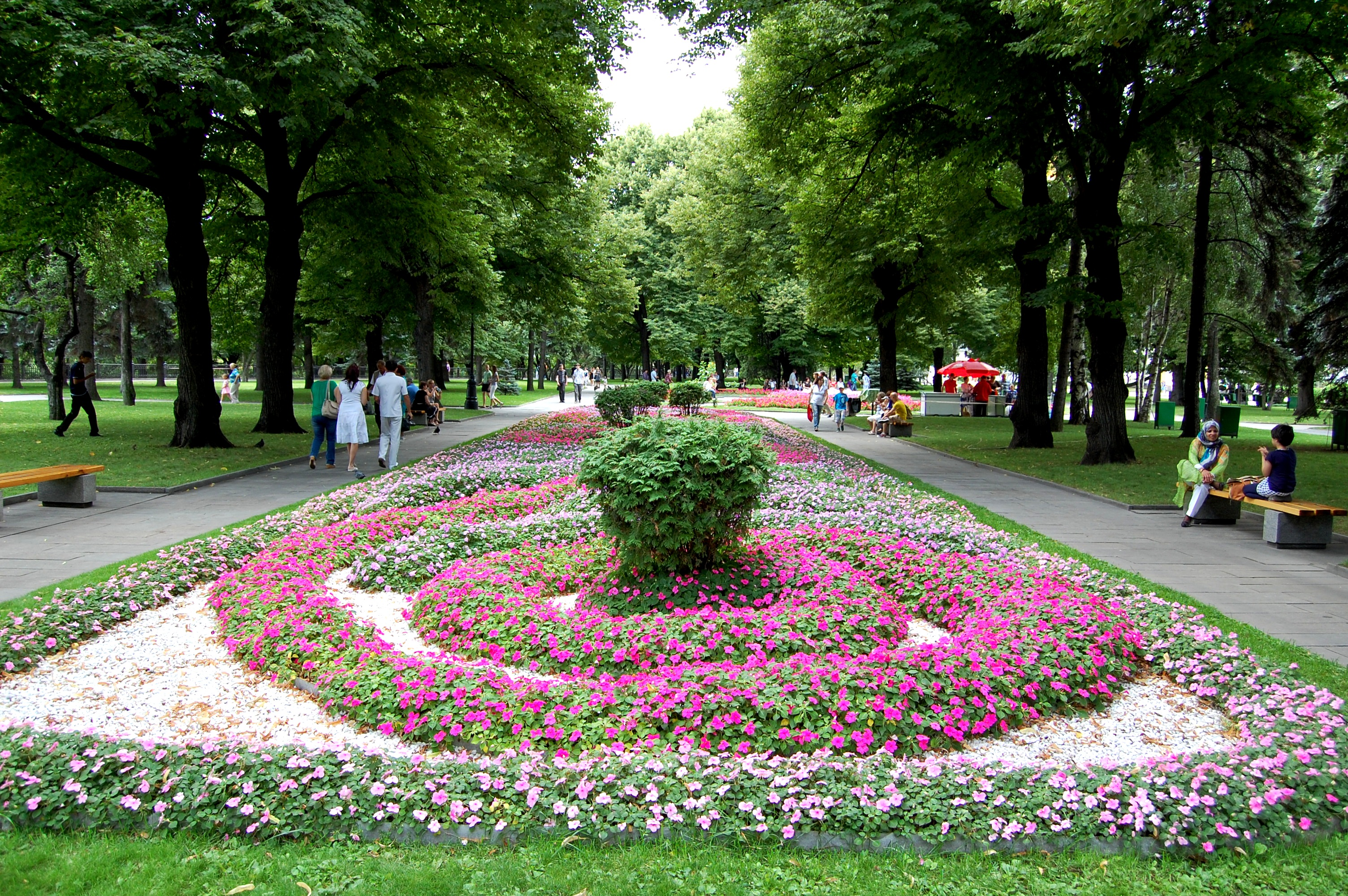

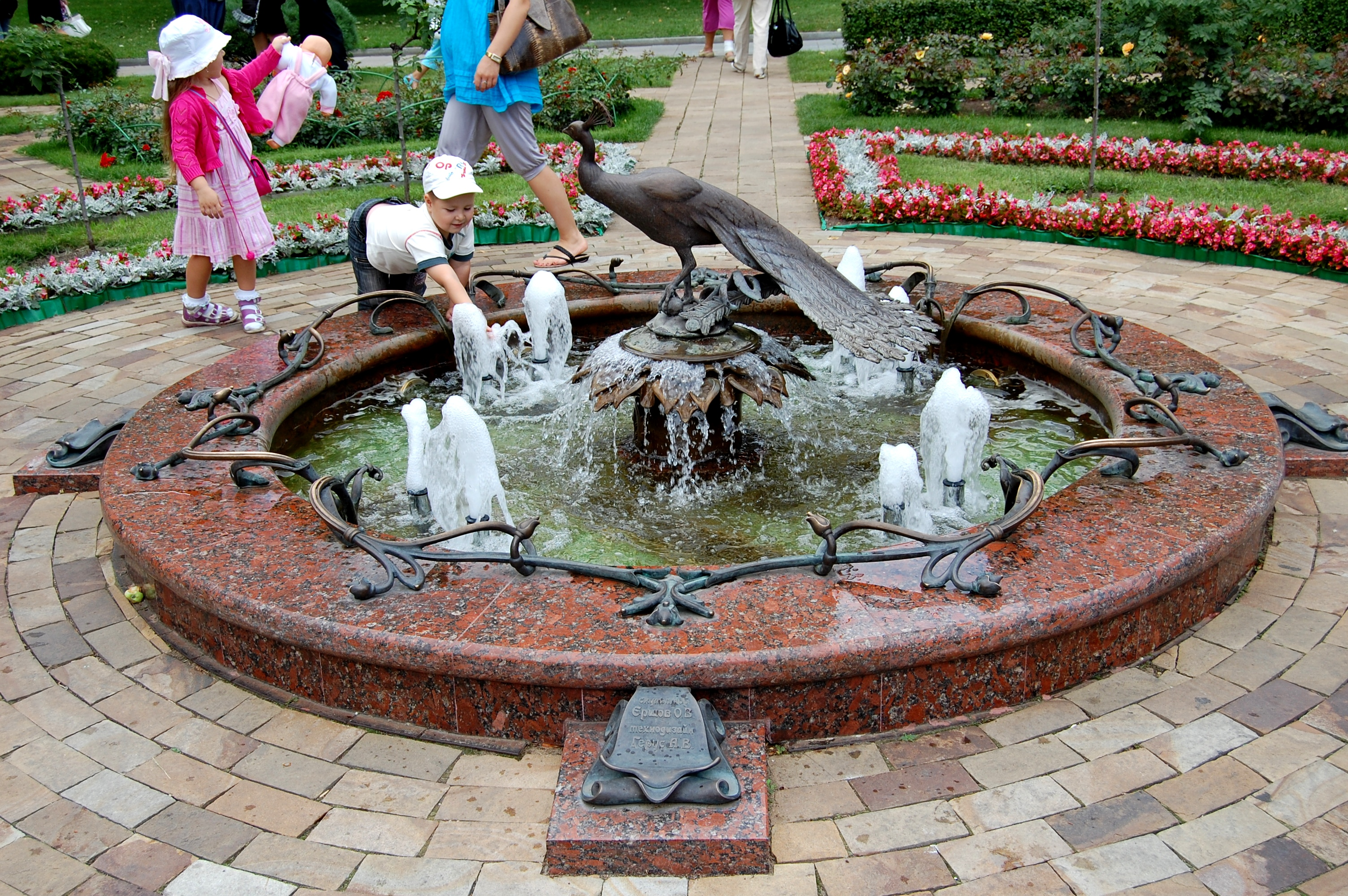

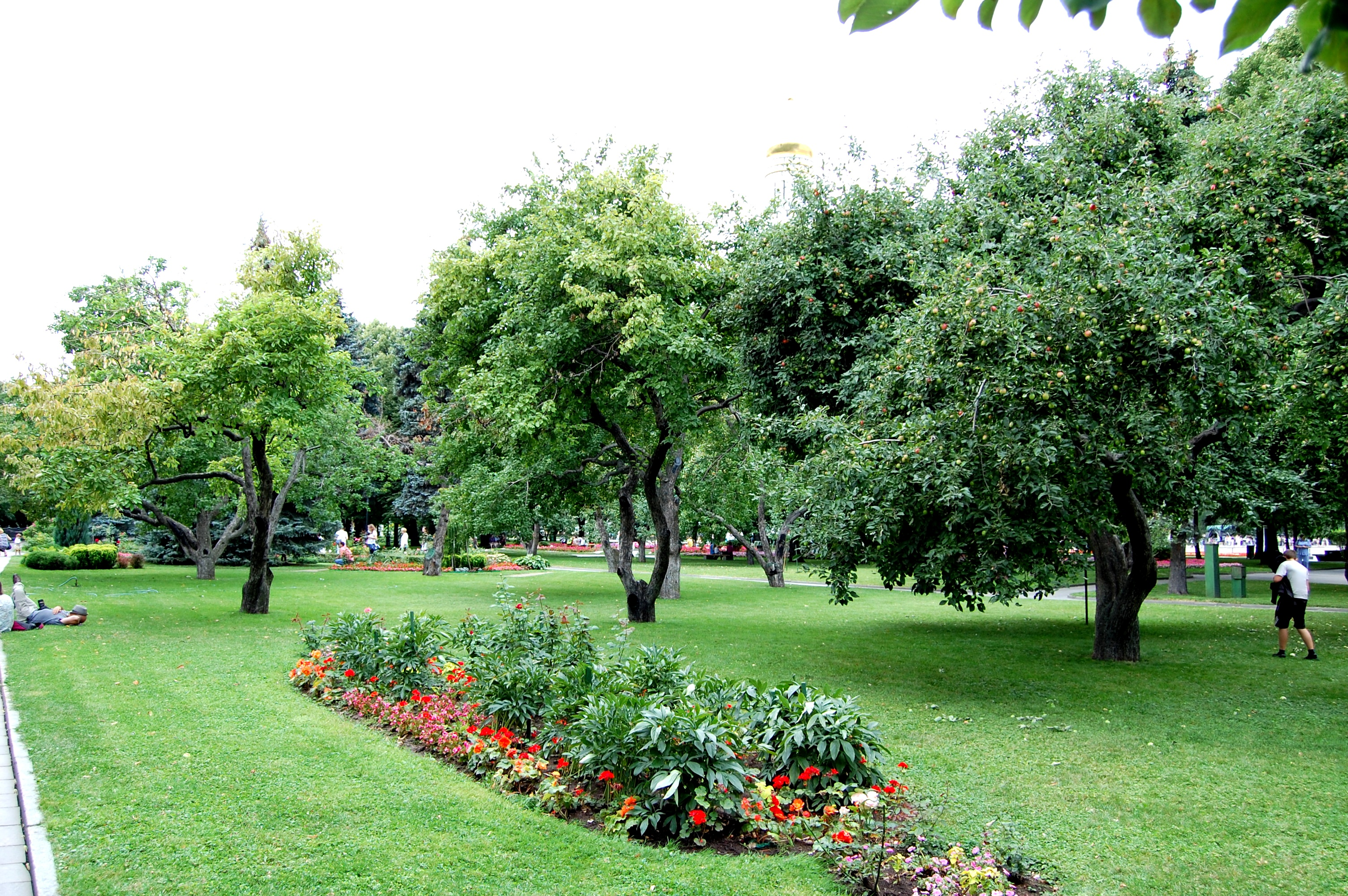

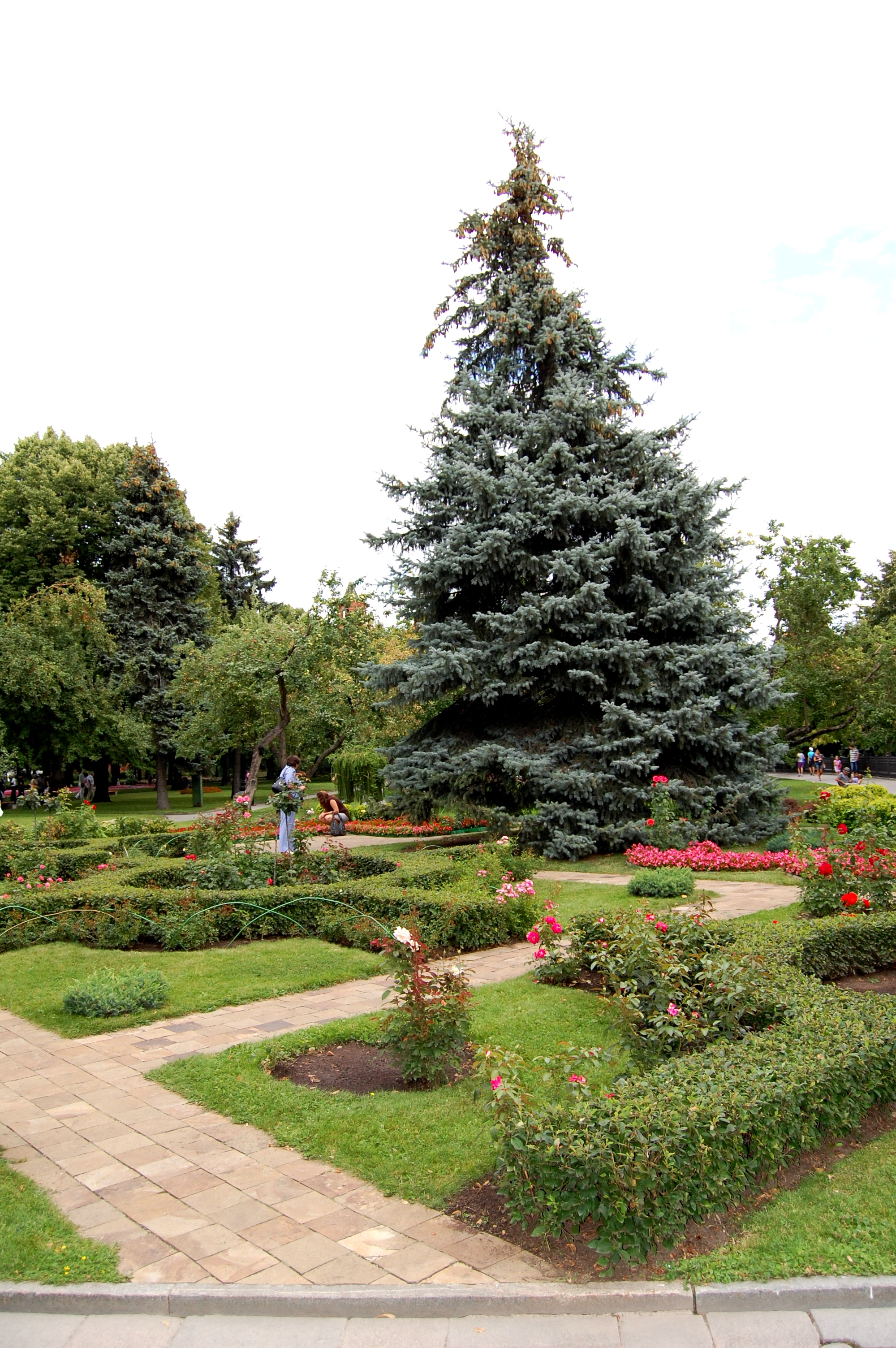

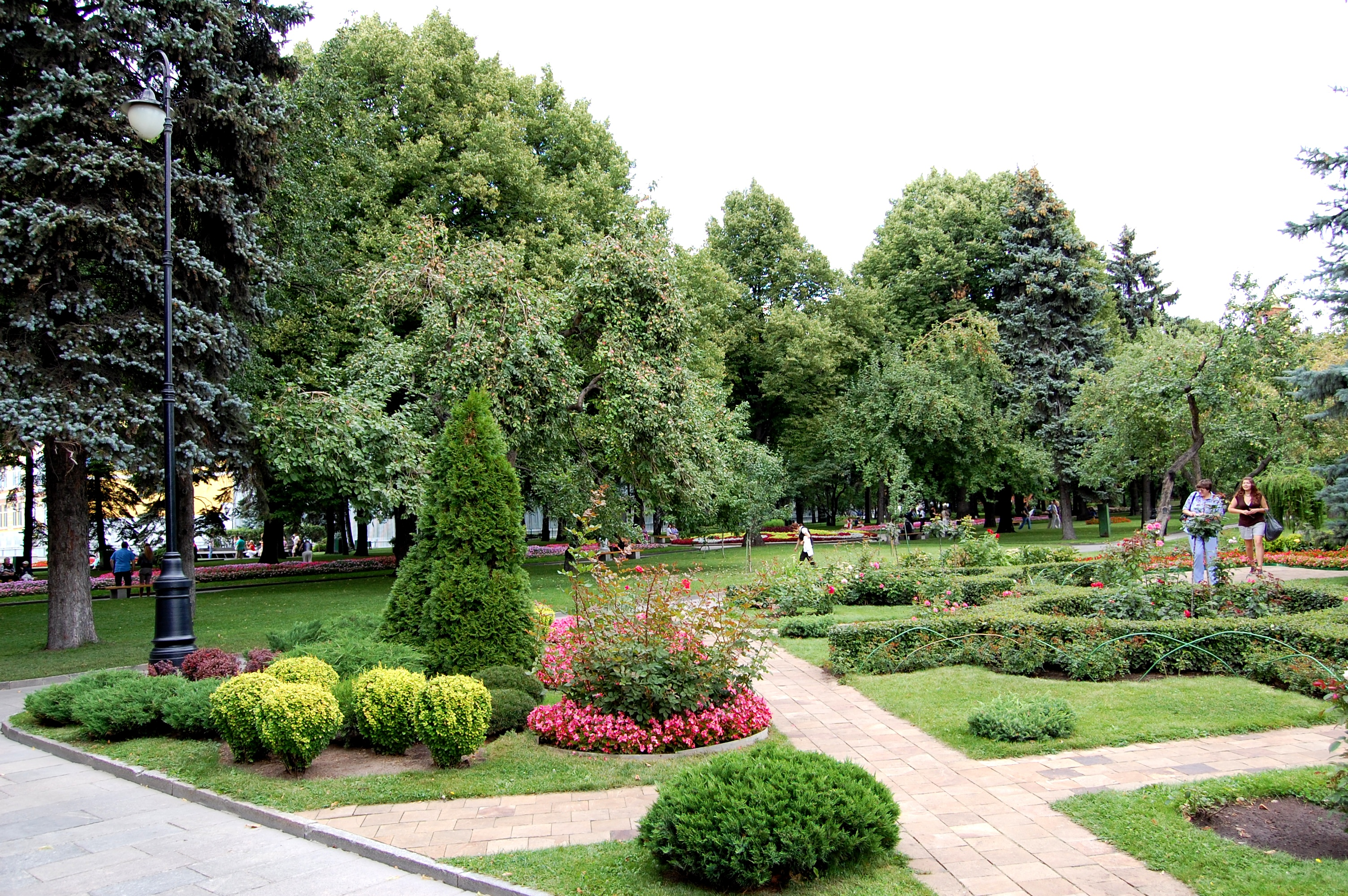
