= Lenin Square =

Lenin Square or Ploshchad Lenina (Russian: Площадь Ленина) may refer to:

== Locations ==
=== Former ===
- Azadliq Square, Baku, Azerbaijan
- Dousti Square, Dushanbe, Tajikistan
- Freedom Square, Tbilisi, Georgia
- Independence Square, Gyumri, Armenia
- Independence Square, Minsk, Belarus
- Lukiškės Square, Vilnius, Lithuania
- Republic Square, Yerevan, Armenia
- Mustaqillik Maydoni, Tashkent, Uzbekistan
- Astana Square, Almaty, Kazakhstan

=== Current ===
- Lenin Square, Cavriago, Italy
- Lenin Square, Khabarovsk, Russia
- Lenin Square, Novosibirsk, Russia
- Lenin Square, Donetsk, Ukraine (Note: Donetsk is currently under Russian occupation as capital of the Donetsk People's Republic)
- Lenin Square, Khabarovsk, Russia

== Metro stations ==
=== In Russia ===
- Ploshchad Lenina (St. Petersburg Metro)
- Ploshchad Lenina (Volgograd Metro)
- Ploshchad Lenina (Minsk Metro)
- Ploshchad Lenina (Novosibirsk Metro)
- Ploshchad Lenina (Ufa Metro)

=== Outside of Russia ===
- Ploshchad Lenina (Donetsk Metro)
- Republic Square (Yerevan Metro)
- Mustaqilliq Maidoni (Tashkent Metro)
- Tavisuplebis Moedani (Tbilisi Metro)

== See also ==
- List of places named after Vladimir Lenin
