= Fyodor Schechtel =

Russian architect (1859–1926)

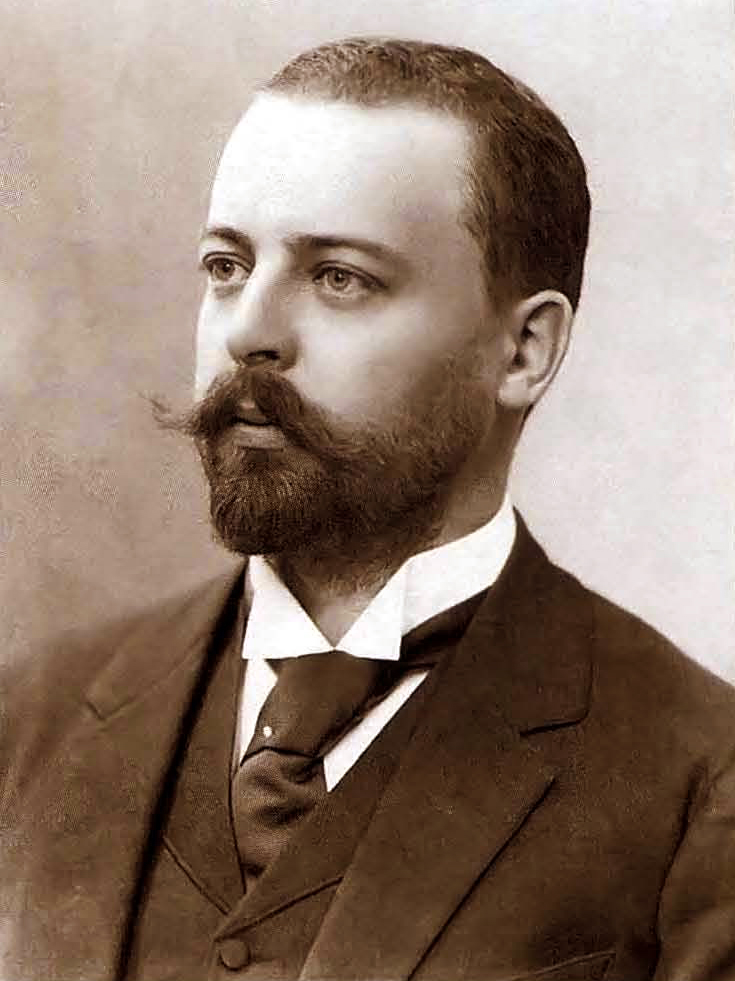
- Portrait, 1890s
- Born: August 7, 1859; Saint Petersburg, Russia
- Died: July 7, 1926 (aged 66); Moscow, Russian SFSR, Soviet Union
- Occupation: Architect
- Practice: Own firm
- Buildings: Yaroslavsky Rail Terminal

Fyodor Osipovich Schechtel (Russian: Фёдор О́сипович Ше́хтель; 7 August [O.S. 26 July] 1859 – July 7, 1926) was a Russian architect, graphic artist and stage designer. He was the most influential and prolific master of Russian Art Nouveau and late Russian Revival architecture.

Baptised as Franz Albert Schechtel (also transliterated as Shekhtel), he created most of his work as Franz Schechtel (Франц Шехтель), changing his name to Fyodor with the outbreak of World War I. In two decades of independent practice he completed five theaters, five churches, 39 private residences, Yaroslavsky Rail Terminal and various other buildings, primarily in Moscow. Most of his legacy survives to date.

== Biography ==
=== Early life ===
Franz Schechtel (Russified as Fyodor Osipovich) was born to a family of ethnic German engineers in Saint Petersburg, the second of five children. His parents were Volga Germans of Saratov. His mother, born Daria Karlovna Zhegin, came from a family of Saratov merchants. Schechtel's uncle on his father's side, also named Franz Schechtel, was an established businessman in Saratov. He is credited with building the first theater in Saratov. See also a photocopy of the Schechtel family tree.

The Schechtel family relocated to Saratov in 1865 to assist the ailing Franz Sr. in business. Both brothers, Franz Sr. and Osip, died in 1867. Business debts ruined their families, forcing Daria Karlovna to seek free boarding schools for the children; she relocated to Moscow and worked for Pavel Tretyakov. Franz attended a free Roman Catholic seminary in Saratov, graduating in 1875. However, he received his high school diploma only in 1880, when he was drafted into the Russian Imperial Army (Schechtel was eventually relieved from service).

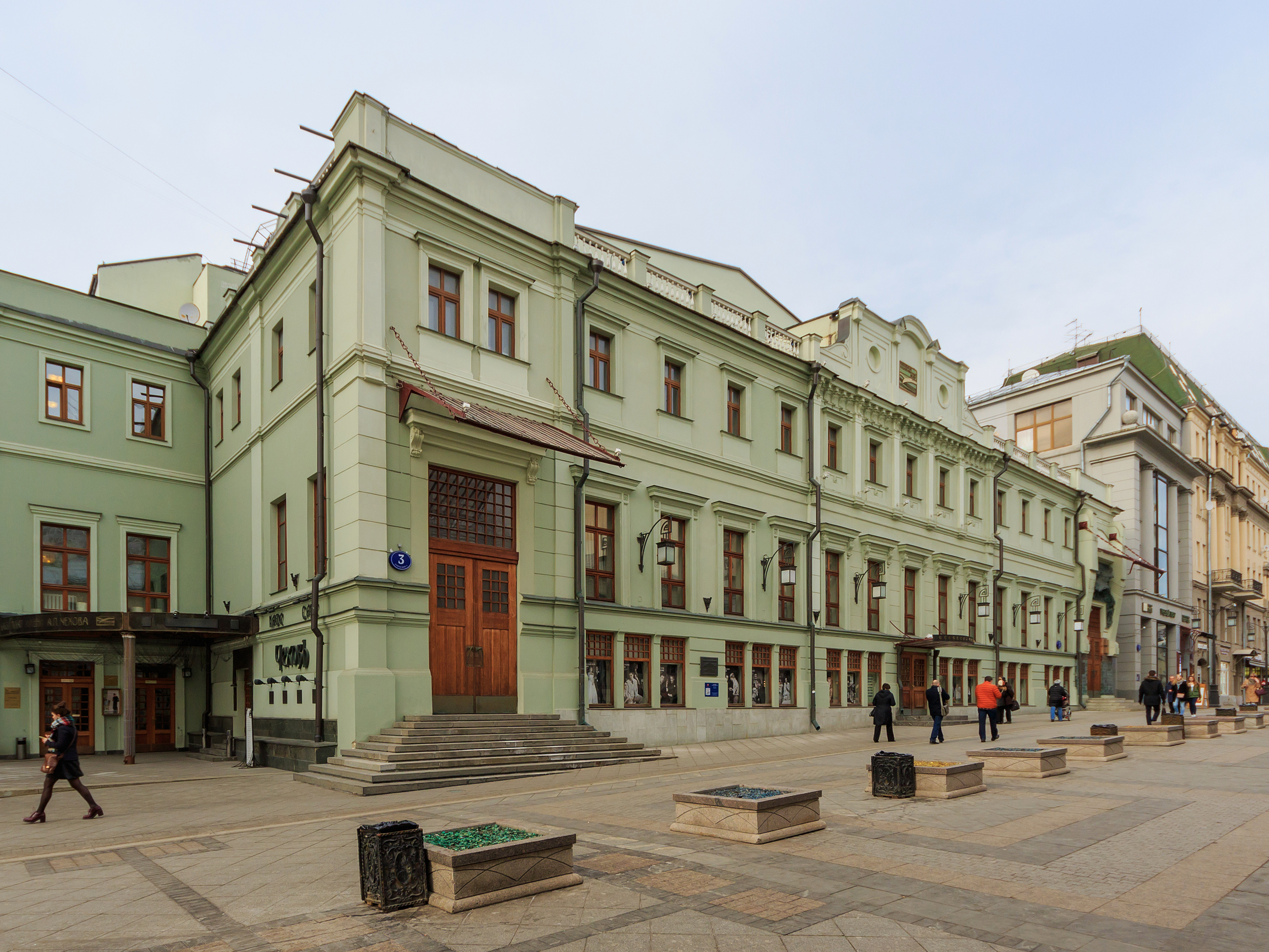
Rebuilding Moscow Art Theater was Schechtel's tribute to the artistic Moscow of the 1880s that shaped his talent, with contributions by Anna Golubkina and Ivan Fomin

=== An emerging artist ===
In 1875 Schechtel arrived in Moscow and attended architectural classes at the Moscow School of Painting, Sculpture and Architecture. He was expelled in 1878 for "bad attendance." 19-year-old Franz made his living by assisting architect Alexander Kaminsky (a relative of Pavel Tretyakov), in painting icons, church frescoes and daily illustrations for newspapers and magazines. There he met author and playwright Anton Chekhov and his brother Nikolay Chekhov. Schechtel illustrated a book for Chekhov in 1886, who then recommended Schechtel to other clients. This experience (as well as the Tretyakov connection) familiarized Franz with Moscow's artistic circles and the wealthy patrons of the arts who would become his future clients, notably the Morozov family of Old Believers.

Throughout the 1880s, Schechtel completed many theatrical stage designs; most of his graphics from this period have been lost, excluding a small fraction stored at the Bakhrushin Museum in Moscow.

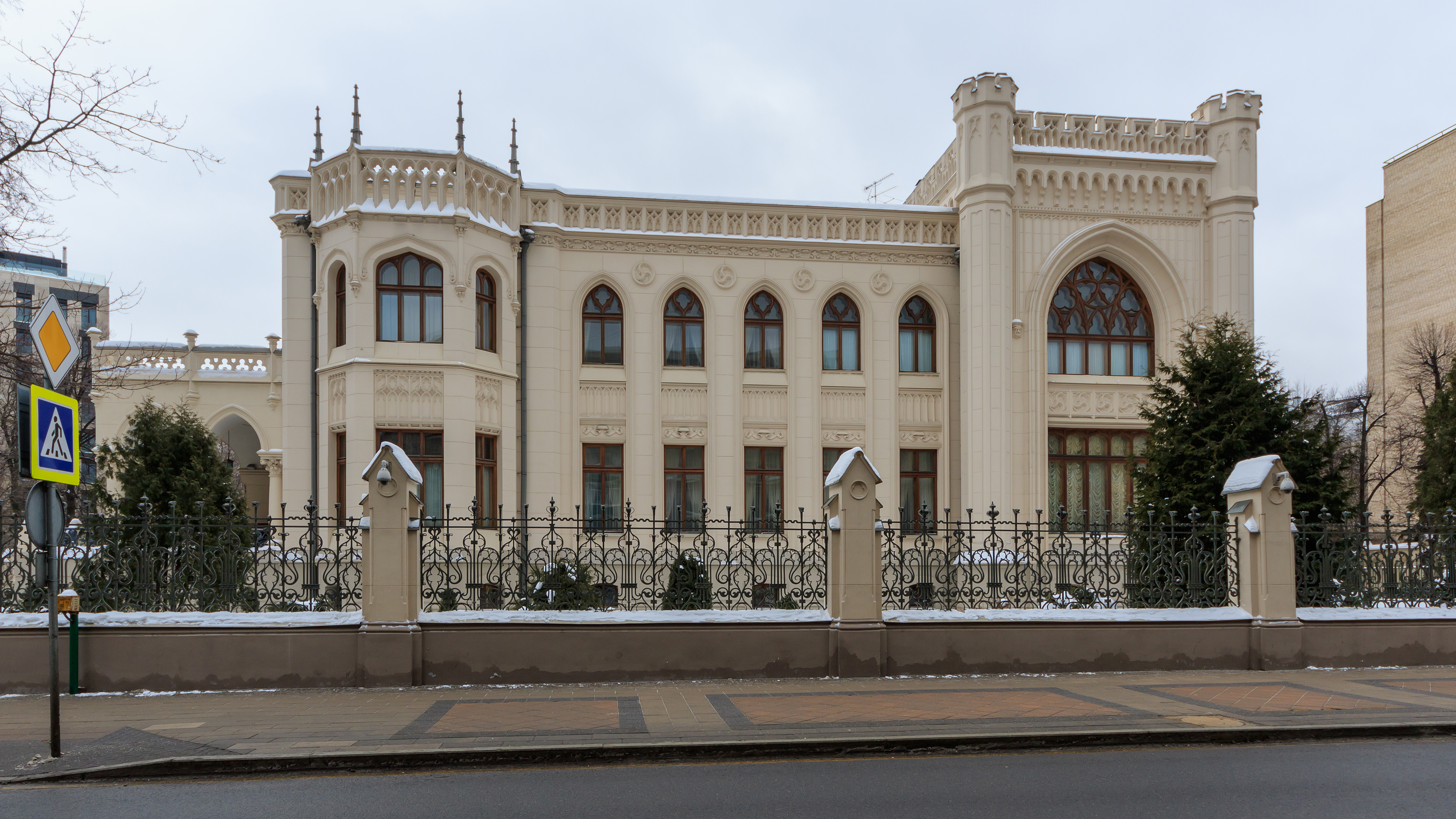
Zinaida Morozova Mansion, 1893

=== Early architecture ===
Schechtel obtained a construction management license in 1894. His earlier projects, completed under Kaminsky's management, are sometimes credited to Kaminsky alone. Schechtel's first own, undisputed building - Zinaida Morozova House in Spiridonovka Street, 1893, famous for Mikhail Vrubel artwork - is a mix of Gothic architecture and romanticism. In the same year he completed the interior of the Kharitonenko Mansion on Sofiiskaya Naberezhnaya. His style during the 1890s meanders between Gothic and Russian Revival. The first sign of a new, mature style (a Russian version of Art Nouveau, Russky Modern), appears in his 1899 Arshinov House in Bolshaya Ordynka Street.

=== Art Nouveau ===
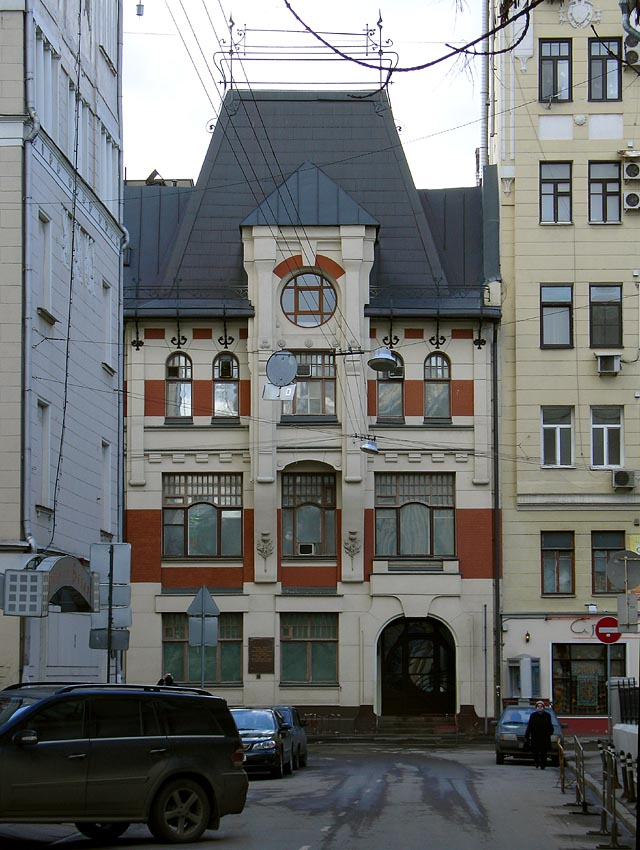
Levenson Printshop, Moscow (1900)

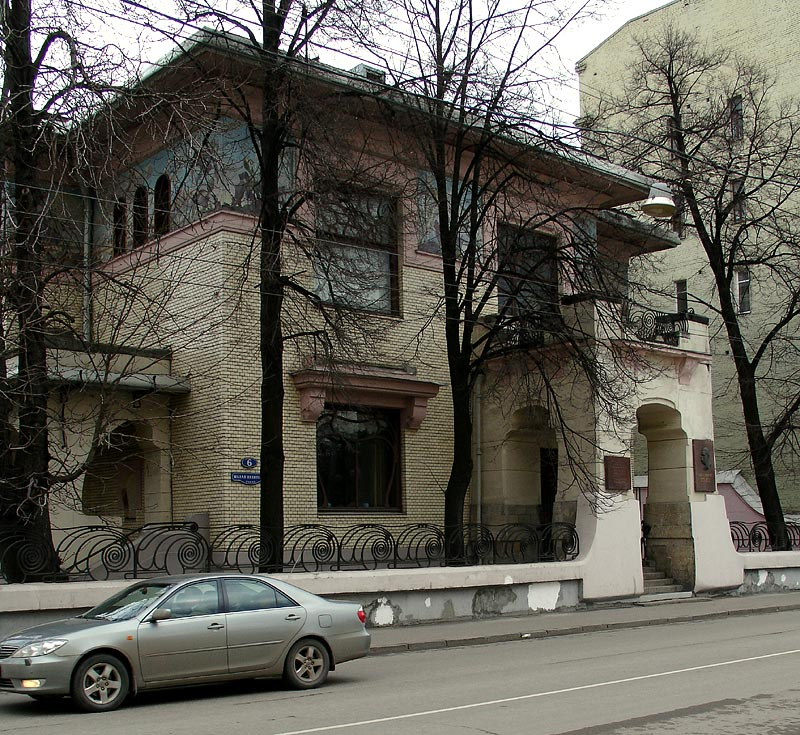
Ryabushinsky House, 6, Malaya Nikitskaya, Moscow (1900)

Schechtel's turn to Art Nouveau is associated with the 1900 Levenson Printshop in Trekhprudny Lane, in Patriarshy Ponds, a well-to-do neighborhood near Moscow's center. Patriarshy Ponds is still home to many of Schechtel's works, including two of his own residences from 1896 and 1910. Schechtel designed the Printshop to have Gothic trim, but changed his plan midway through construction. His "Popov Tea House" pavilion at the Exposition Universelle (1900) in Paris earned a silver medal, exposing him to international fame (diploma). At home, he was inducted as a member of the Imperial Academy of Arts in 1902 (photograph of diploma).

1899-1903 were Schechtel's most productive years. In this period, he designed (in Moscow alone, not including out-of-town commissions):

- 1899: Arshinov House (32, Bolshaya Ordynka) and offices (5, Staropansky Lane)
- 1900: Lutheran chapel (7, Starosadsky Lane)
- 1900: Levenson Printshop (9, Trekhprudny Lane)
- 1900: Ryabushinsky Mansion (6, Malaya Nikitskaya Street), now known as the Gorky Museum
- 1901: Derozhinskaya Mansion (7, Kropotkinsky Lane)
- 1901: "Boyarsky Dvor" hotel and offices (1, Staraya Square) photographs, floorplan
- 1901: Kahn apartment building (35, Malaya Nikitskaya Street)
- 1902: Yaroslavsky Rail Terminal (completed 1904), the most visible of his Moscow works
- 1902: St.Nicholas chapel (Tverskaya-Yamskaya Street) destroyed 1930s
- 1900-1903: Moscow Art Theatre reconstruction (facade curtain artwork)
- 1901-1903: Smirnov House reconstruction (18, Tverskoy Boulevard)
- 1903: Ryabushinsky Bank (Birzhevaya Square)

Unlike his rival Lev Kekushev, Schechtel never committed himself to a single style. His Yaroslavsky Terminal and Ryabushinsky House are distinct, setting two trends of Schechtel's future work: the internationalized, refined Art Nouveau and the last round of Russian Revival before the Revolution of 1917.

=== Mature years ===
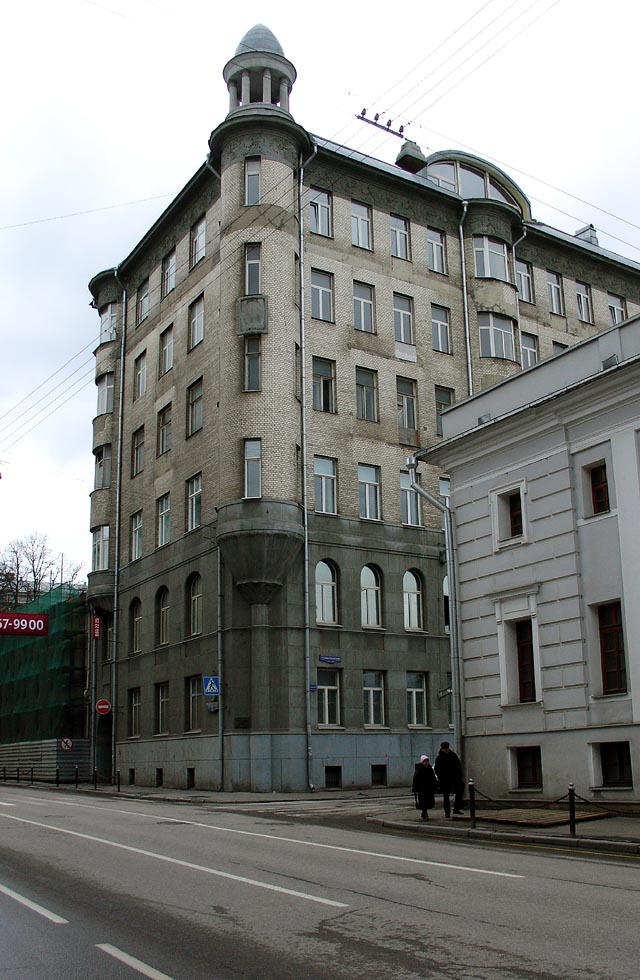
Shamshin Building, Moscow, 1909

In the aftermath of the Russian Revolution of 1905 the Russian government lifted all limitations on Old Believers, and they responded by commissioning churches to be built all over the country. In 1909 Schechtel won an open contest to construct Belokrinitskoe Soglasie church in Balakovo, financed by the Balakovo-based Maltsev brothers. By this time, Schechtel (a Roman Catholic) had firmly established himself within the Old Believer community, having done previous projects for the Maltsevs. Schechtel designed an eight-faceted tented church, borrowing elements from the style of the Church of Ascension at Kolomenskoye in Moscow and older architectural traditions of the Russian North. The church, which could accommodate 1,200 worshippers, was completed in 1912, but was later destroyed during the Soviet period. It is now being rebuilt by the Russian Orthodox Church).

After 1905, Schechtel was famous for his office buildings, applying Art Nouveau concepts to steel frame structures, notably the 1907 Ryabushinsky Printshop in Putinkovsky Lane (photographs, floorplan) and the 1909 Merchant's Society offices in Cherkassky Lanes (photograph, floorplans, the latter damaged by inadequate replacement of the original windows). Emphasis on the top floor ornamentation, witnessed in the Merchant Society Building, became a key feature in the so-called Rationalist Modern trend in commercial architectural design.

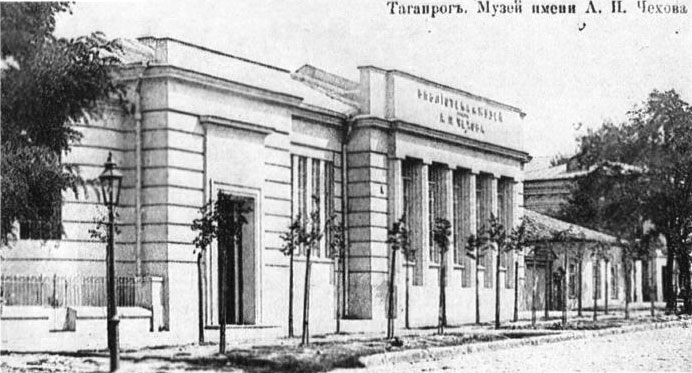
Neoclassical Chekhov Library, Taganrog, 1914

In 1909 Schechtel turned to Neoclassical Revival, building his own (third) residence on the Garden Ring in strict Doric style. He began taking more commissions outside Moscow, notably in Nizhny Novgorod, his hometown of Saratov, and Taganrog, including the neoclassical Chekhov Library in 1914. Vladimir Lenin's refuge in 1923-1924, the neoclassical Gorki Leninskiye estate (formerly Morozov property), is also Schechtel's design.

=== Death and legacy ===
The advent of World War I in 1914, which halted practically all new construction for a decade, brought an end to Schechtel's professional career. His last work before the revolution was a wooden tented church in the Moscow suburb of Solomennaya Storozhka, funded by the Tula Militia training camp. Schechtel modelled the church on historical Olonets area models (excluding the integrated belfry, which was uncommon for Olonets architecture). The church was closed in the 1930s, neglected and eventually demolished in the 1960s; a wooden replica was built in 1996-1997. Schectel's only post-1917 work, a pavilion at the 1923 All-Russia Agricultural Exhibition, met a similar fate.

Shechtel cooperated with various planning and design agencies, continued teaching at Stroganov School of Arts and VKhuTEMAS, and even applied to the 1925 Lenin Mausoleum contest (Schechtel's entry), but did not build anything anymore. Construction in the USSR, halted by a decade of hostilities, resumed in 1926, the year of Schechtel's death.

In 1918, the architect was evicted from his house on Bolshaya Sadovaya and had to live with his daughter, Vera Tonkova (née Schechtel). Of Schechtel's four children, two of them — Vera Tonkova and Lev Zhegin — would become well-known artists. According to several accounts, however, Schechtel died in bitter poverty. He was interred at Vagankovo Cemetery.

Schechtel's Art Nouveau was despised by Soviet critics as rotten formalism until the Brezhnev period. At the same time, his Neo-Russian structures, such as Yaroslavsky Terminal, which matched the patriotic Soviet rhetoric quite well, were at first tolerated and later praised. Many of his Moscow mansions were leased to foreign embassies, have been well maintained and are still in good order inside and out. His public buildings, including his theaters and the Taganrog Library, also remain close to their original design externally.

== Buildings ==
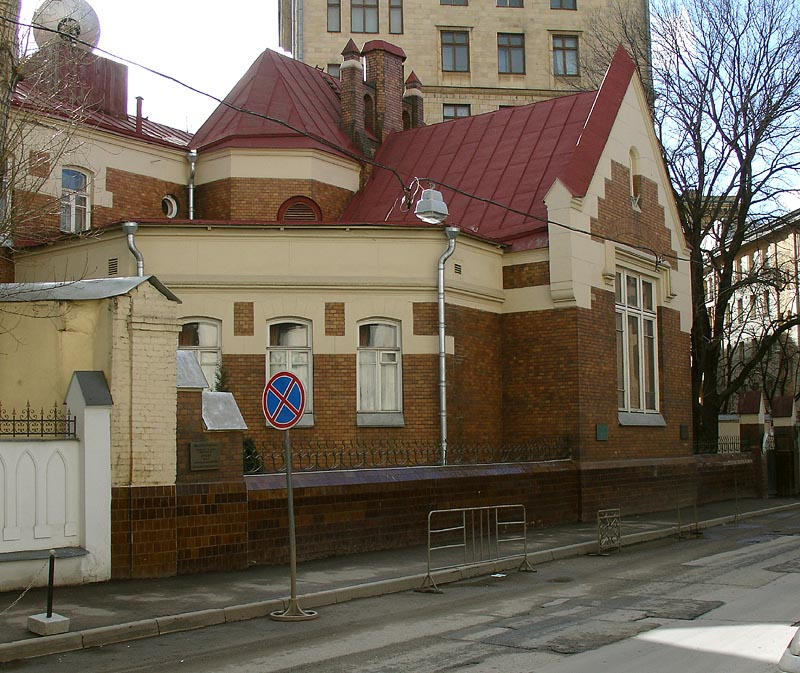
Schechtel's second own house, in Yermolayevsky Lane, 1896

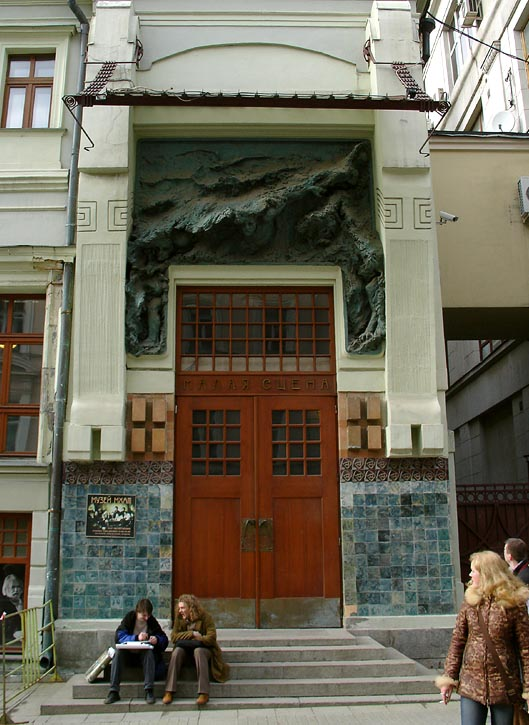
Moscow Art Theater, main entrance, sculpture by Anna Golubkina

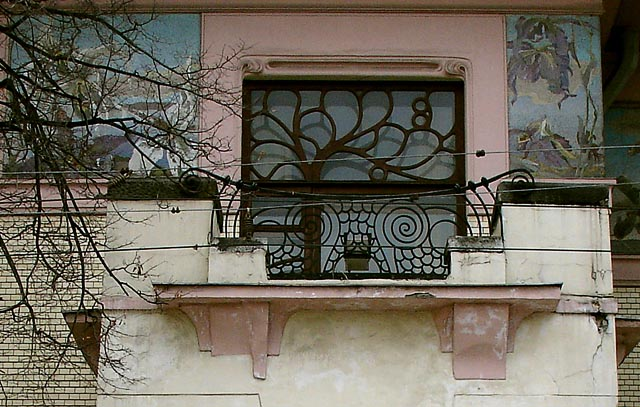
Details of 1900 Ryabushinsky House

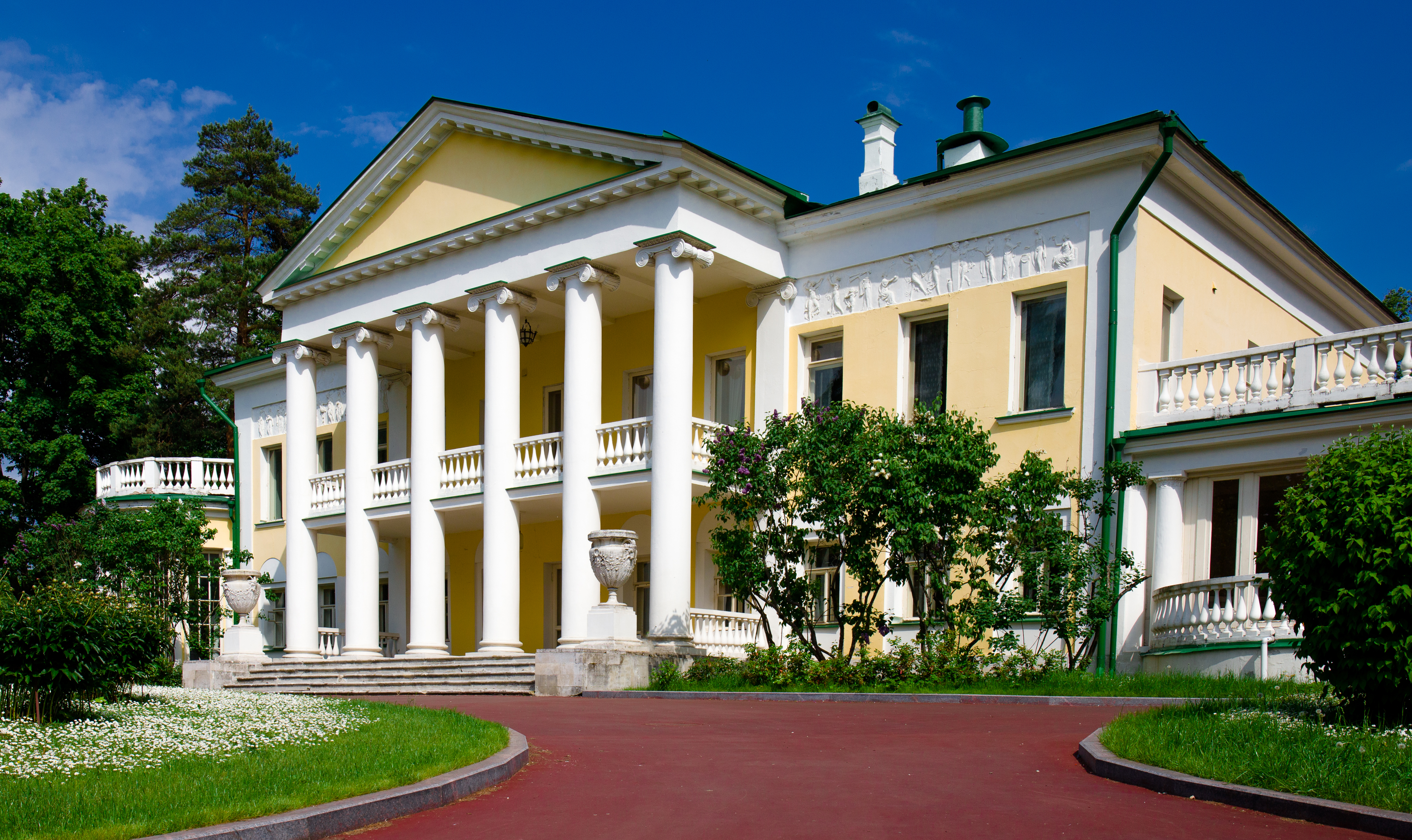
Morozova estate, now Gorki Leninskiye

- 1884: Shchapov Building (58, Baumanskaya Street, Moscow) - assistant to Alexander Kaminsky. First record of Schechtel's architecture.
- 1886: Paradise Theater (Bolshaya Nikitskaya, Moscow, now Mayakovsky Theater), with Konstantin Tersky
- 1887: (draft) Archangel Michael chapel, Taganrog
- 1889: Own (first) house (20, Peterburg Highway, Moscow, destroyed 1937)
- 1889: Von Dervis estates, Ryazan Oblast gallery
- 1889: Morozov memorial chapel (Rogozhskoye Cemetery, Moscow)
- 1892: Morozov House (Kirzhach)
- 1890: Lukalov country estate (Velikoye, Yaroslavl Oblast) photo
- 1891: Vikula Morozov country estate (Odintsovo-Arkhangeskoye, near Domodedovo) rebuilt and(or) destroyed Gates, 1900s see also
- 1893: Zinaida Morozova Mansion (Spiridonovka Street, Moscow), completed 1898
- 1893 [Pavel Kharitonenko] House, (Sofiiskaya Naberezhnaya, Moscow)
- 1896: Kuznetsov House (43, Prospekt Mira, Moscow)
- 1896: Own (second) House (28, Yermolaevsky Lane, Moscow)
- 1897: Varvara Morozova memorial chapel (Preobrazhenskoye Cemetery, Moscow)
- 1897: (draft) People's House in Sokolniki, Moscow draft
- 1899: Zakharyin memorial chapel (Kurkino, now Moscow)
- 1899: Arshinov House (32, Bolshaya Ordynka, Moscow)
- 1899: Arshinov offices (5, Staropansky Lane, Moscow)
- 1900: Lutheran chapel (7, Starosadsky Lane, Moscow)
- 1900: Ryabushinsky Mansion (Malaya Nikitskaya Street, Moscow)
- 1900: Church of the Saviour, Ivanovo (Byzantine Revival style, completed 1903, destroyed 1937)
- 1900: Maltsev House (75, Kommunisticheskaya Street, Balakovo) www.museum.ru
- 1901: Derozhinskaya Mansion (Kropotkinsky Lane, Moscow, currently Embassy of Australia)
- 1901: Russian Pavilion at Glasgow Exhibition
- 1901: "Boyarsky Dvor" hotel and offices (Staraya Square, Moscow photographs, floorplan
- 1901: Kahn apartment building (35, Malaya Nikitskaya Street, Moscow)
- 1902: Yaroslavsky Rail Terminal (completed 1904)
- 1902: St. Nicholas chapel (Tverskaya-Yamskaya Street, Moscow) destroyed 1930s
- 1900-1903: Moscow Art Theatre reconstruction (facade curtain artwork)
- 1901-1903: Smirnov House (18, Tverskoy Boulevard, reconstruction of earlier structure)
- 1903: Ryabushinsky Bank (Birzhevaya Square, Moscow)
- 1904: Stroganov School apartment building (24, Myasnitskaya Street, Moscow) photographs, floorplan
- 1904?: Kharitonenko House (12, Sofiyskaya Embankment, Moscow, former Gustav List house, now Embassy of United Kingdom) with Vasily Zalessky
- 1904?: Anton Chekhov's tomb Novodevichy Cemetery
- 1905: Old Believers' Church house (4, Turchaninov Lane, Moscow)
- 1906: Levenson House ("Teremok", 4, Chobotovsky Proezd, Moscow)
- 1907: Ryabushinsky Printshop ("Utro Rossii", 3, Bolshoy Putinkovsky Lane, Moscow, completed 1909) photographs, floorplan
- 1907: Patrikeev House (6, Pravoberezhnaya Street, Moscow, now within Hospital No.1)
- 1908: Winter Theater (55, Krasnaya Street, Krasnodar) with Alexander Kozlov
- 1909: Merchants' Society offices (2, Maly Cherkassky Lane, Moscow) photograph, floorplans
- 1909: Apartment building (13, Pyatnitskaya, Moscow)
- 1909: "Khudozhestvenny" Cinema (Arbat Square, Moscow)
- 1909: Shamshin apartment building (8/13, Znamenka Street, Moscow)
- 1909: Zakharyin Hospital (Kurkino, now Moscow) with Igor Grabar
- 1909: Stroganov School Store (Rozhdestvenka Street, Moscow)
- 1909: Own (third) house (4, Bolshaya Sadovaya Street, Moscow)
- 1909: Zinaida Morozova (Zimina) estate, now Gorki Leninskiye, completed 1914
- 1910: (draft) Bank Offices (Nikolskaya Street, Moscow)
- 1911: Chekhov Library, Taganrog draft, completed 1914
- 1911: Rukavishnikov House (39, Bolshaya Pokrovskaya Street, Nizhny Novgorod, later a concert hall) 1980s photo
- 1912: Sharonov Mansion (80, Frunze Street, Taganrog)
- 1911: Reyneke House (22, Sobornaya, Saratov)
- 1913: Rukavishnikov Bank (23, Rozhdestvenskaya, Nizhny Novgorod) 1980s photo: Embankment facade Street facade
- 1913: Mindovskaya House (9, Vspolny Lane, Moscow)
- 1913?: Suroshnikov House (Samara) photo
- 1914: Erlanger crypt (Vvedenskoye cemetery, Moscow)
- 1914: (draft) Museum in Nizhny Novgorod draft
- 1916: St.Nicholas Church of Tula Druzhina (Solomennaya Storozhka, Moscow, destroyed 1960) exterior interior photo The wooden tented church was rebuilt in 1996-1997: Official site
- 1923: Turkestan Pavilion, All-Russian Exhibition in Moscow
- 1925: (draft) Lenin Mausoleum www.utopia.ru

== See also ==
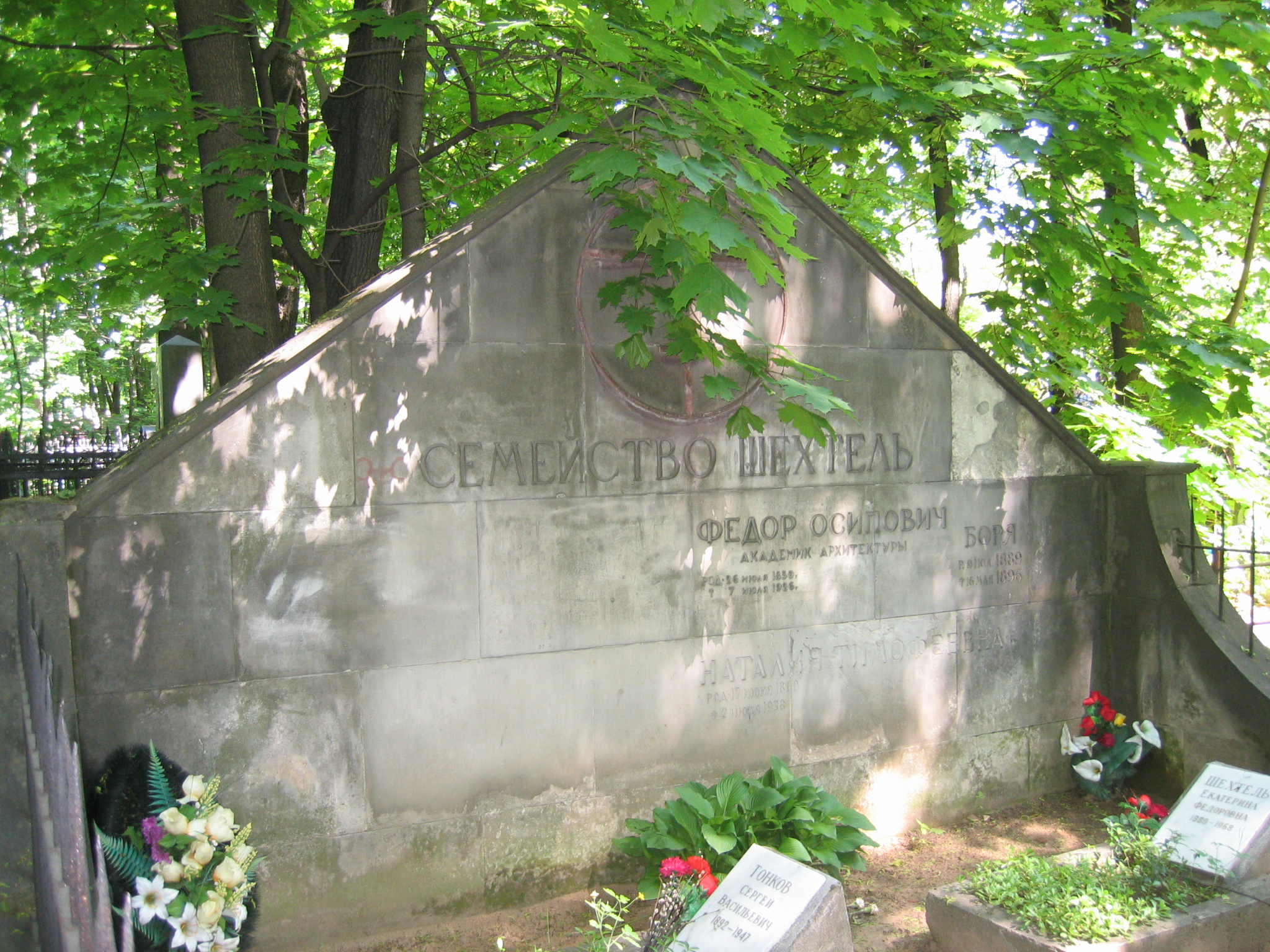
Schechtel's grave in Vagankovo cemetery

- William Craft Brumfield. The Origins of Modernism in Russian Architecture (Berkeley: University of California Press, 1991) ISBN 0-520-06929-3
- William C. Brumfield, "Fedor Shekhtel: Aesthetic Idealism in Modernist Architecture", 1991 www.cdlib.org
