= Gorki Leninskiye =

Gorki Leninskiye Горки Ленинские
- Urban-type settlement
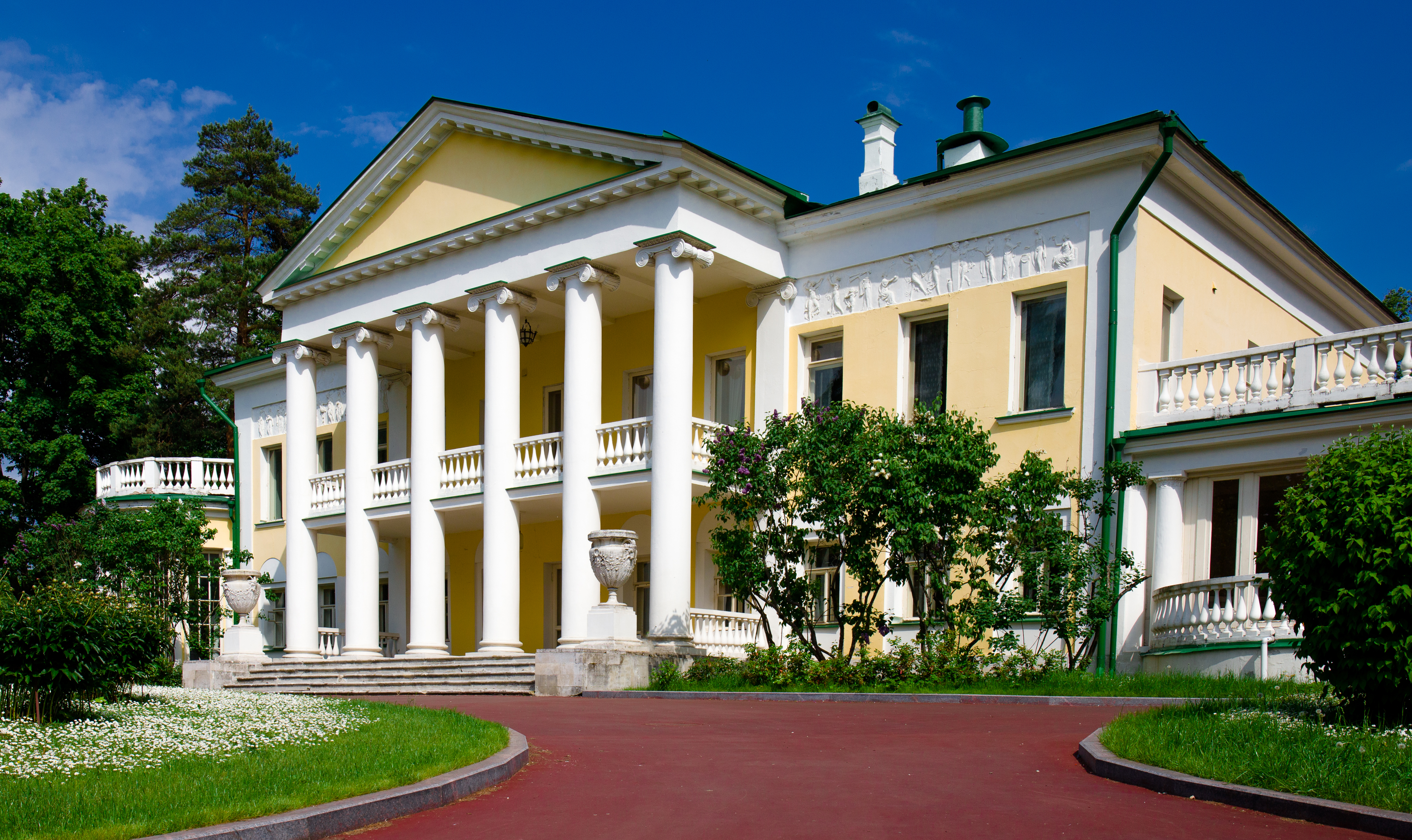
- Gorki Leninskiye Estate Museum, Main House (June 2022)

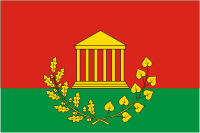
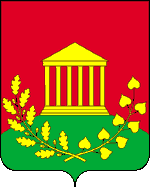
- Flag Coat of arms
- Interactive map of Gorki Leninskiye
- Location of Gorki Leninskiye Gorki Leninskiye (Moscow Oblast)
- Coordinates: 55°30′16.2″N 37°45′54.1″E
- Country: Russia
- Federal subject: Moscow Oblast
- Administrative district: Leninsky District

Population (2010 Census)
  - Total: 3,586
  - Estimate (2025): 3,236 (−9.8%)
- Time zone: UTC+3 (MSK)
- Postal code: 142712
- OKTMO ID: 46628155051

Gorki Leninskiye (Russian: Горки Ленинские, lit. 'Lenin Hill(ock)s') is an urban locality (a work settlement) in Leninsky District of Moscow Oblast, Russia, located 10 kilometers (6.2 mi) south of Moscow city limits and the Moscow Ring Road. Its population is: 3,586 (2010 census); 1,729 (2002 census); 1,711 (1989 Soviet census).

The estate of Gorki belonged to various Muscovite noblemen from the 18th century. Zinaida Morozova, the widow of Savva Morozov, purchased it in 1909, the year before she married General Anatoly Reinbot (later Anatoly Rezvoy), the chief of Moscow police. She engaged the most fashionable Russian architect, Fyodor Schechtel, to remodel the mansion in the then-current Neoclassical style, complete with a six-column Ionic portico.

On 21 January 1924, Vladimir Lenin, the leader of the Russian SFSR and subsequently the Soviet Union, died at this estate, which he had used as his personal dacha since its nationalization in 1918.

== Lenin's dacha ==
After the Soviet government moved to Moscow in 1918, it nationalized the luxurious estate and converted it into Vladimir Lenin's dacha. In September 1918, the Soviet leader recuperated there following an assassination attempt. He spent an increasing amount of time there as his health declined over the following years. On May 15, 1923, Lenin followed medical advice and left the Moscow Kremlin for Gorki. He lived there in semi-retirement until his death on January 21, 1924.

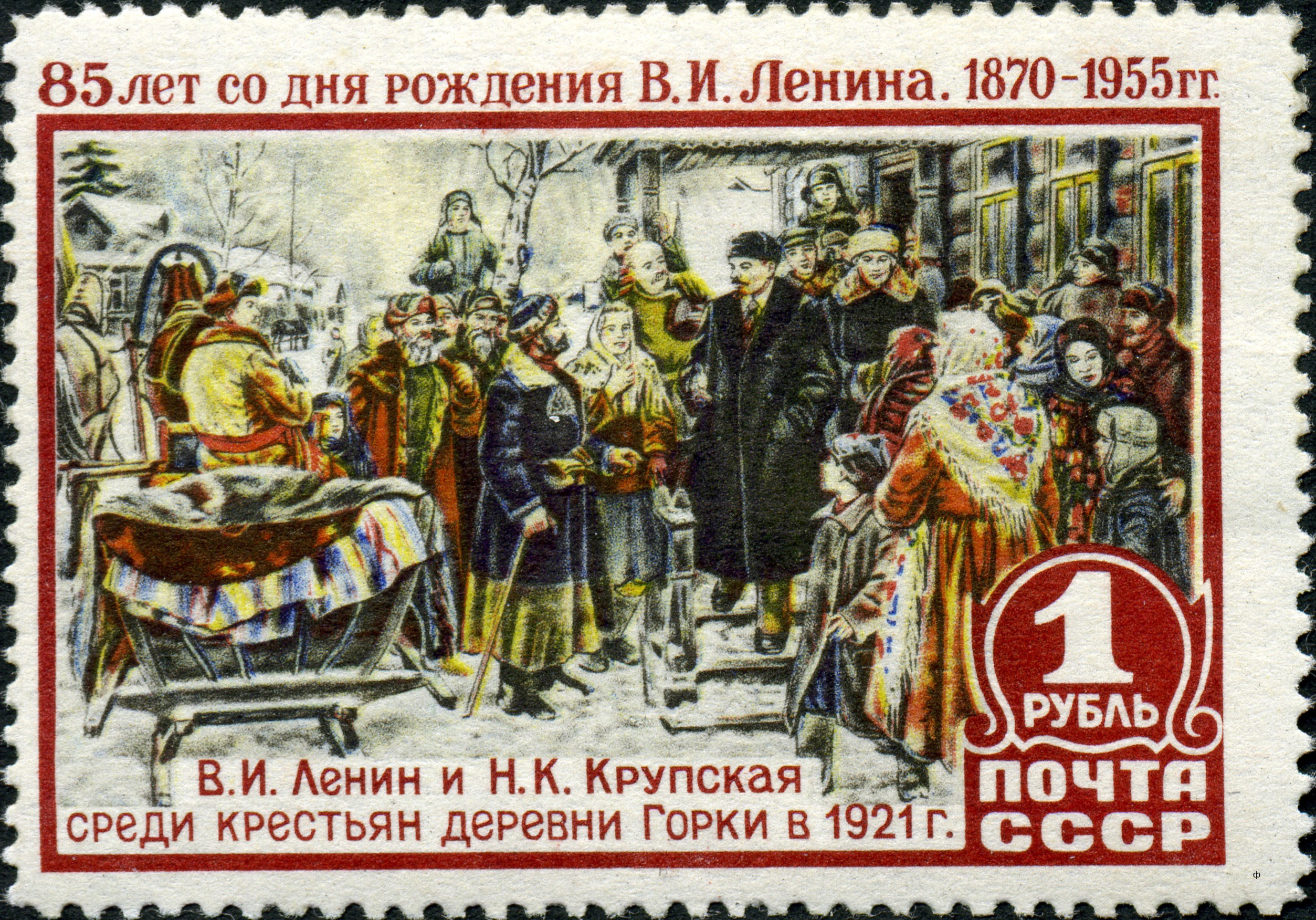
1955 stamp depicting Lenin and Nadezhda Krupskaya among the peasants of Gorki

After Lenin's death, Gorki was renamed Gorki Leninskiye (English: Lenin Hill(ock)s). The house became a museum holding many of Lenin's possessions. Also located on the estate is a large museum built in 1987 concerning Lenin's life there, containing such artifacts as his testament (as transcribed by Nadezhda Krupskaya), other documents, photos, books, Lenin's car (a Rolls-Royce Silver Ghost), his wheelchairs, and his apartment and office from the Kremlin, reconstructed in a separate building. A monument representing "The Death of the Leader" was unveiled in the 18th-century park in 1958.

== See also ==
- List of places named after Vladimir Lenin
