= Həsənqala, Khachmaz =

Həsənqala
- Municipality
- Location within Azerbaijan
- Coordinates: 41°34′50″N 48°41′27″E
- Country: Azerbaijan
- Rayon: Khachmaz

Population
  - Total: 1,568
- Time zone: UTC+4 (AZT)
  - Summer (DST): UTC+5 (AZT)

Həsənqala (also, Gasankala) is a village and municipality in the Khachmaz Rayon of Azerbaijan. It has a population of 1,568. The municipality consists of the villages of Həsənqala and Bala Qusarqışlaq.
