= Bala Qusarqışlaq =

- Location within Azerbaijan
- Coordinates: 41°36′27″N 48°38′58″E
- Country: Azerbaijan
- Rayon: Khachmaz
- Municipality: Həsənqala
- Time zone: UTC+4 (AZT)
  - Summer (DST): UTC+5 (AZT)

Bala Qusarqışlaq (also, Bala-Kusary) is a village in the Khachmaz Rayon of Azerbaijan. The village forms part of the municipality of Həsənqala.
