= Həsənqala, Qusar =

Həsənqala
- Municipality
- Location within Azerbaijan
- Coordinates: 41°27′11″N 48°29′34″E
- Country: Azerbaijan
- Rayon: Qusar

Population
  - Total: 1,200
- Time zone: UTC+4 (AZT)
  - Summer (DST): UTC+4 (AZT)

Həsənqala (also, Gasankala) is a village and municipality in the Qusar Rayon of Azerbaijan. It has a population of 1200.
