= Maltsev =

Maltsev (Russian: Мальцев) is a Russian male surname, its feminine counterpart is Maltseva. It may refer to

- Aleksandr Maltsev (born 1949), Russian ice hockey player
- Aleksandr Maltsev (synchronised swimmer) (born 1995), Russian synchronized swimmer
- Anatoly Maltsev (1909–1967), Russian mathematician
- Dmitry Maltsev (born 1991), Russian ice hockey player
- Eugene Maltsev (1929—2003), Russian painter
- Gleb Maltsev (born 1988), Kazakhstani football player
- Leonid Maltsev (born 1949), Former Minister of Defense of Belarus
- Mikhail Maltsev (born 1998), Russian ice hockey player
- Nikolai Maltsev (born 1986), Russian futsal player
- Oleg Maltsev (born 1967), Russian judoka
- Oleg Viktorovich Maltsev (born 1975), Ukrainian psychologist
- Vladimir Maltsev (born 1974), Ukrainian politician
- Viacheslav Maltsev (born 1964), Russian politician
- Yuliya Maltseva (born 1990), Russian discus thrower
