= Lenin Stadium =

Lenin Stadium was the common name of stadiums in the Soviet Union.

The stadiums formerly called the Lenin Stadium include:

- Luzhniki Stadium in Moscow
- Petrovsky Stadium in Saint Petersburg

The stadiums that still use this name include:

- Lenin Stadium (Khabarovsk)
