= Bala Qusar =

- Municipality
- Location within Azerbaijan
- Coordinates: 41°27′14″N 48°30′30″E
- Country: Azerbaijan
- Rayon: Qusar

Population
  - Total: 1,382
- Time zone: UTC+4 (AZT)
  - Summer (DST): UTC+5 (AZT)

Bala Qusar (also, Bala Kusar and Bala-Kusary) is a village and municipality in the Qusar Rayon of Azerbaijan. It has a population of 1,382.
