= Həsənqaya, Barda =

Həsənqaya
- Municipality
- Location within Azerbaijan Location within Karabakh Economic Region
- Coordinates: 40°26′44″N 47°04′45″E
- Country: Azerbaijan
- Rayon: Barda

Population
  - Total: 1,324
- Time zone: UTC+4 (AZT)
  - Summer (DST): UTC+5 (AZT)

Həsənqaya (also, Hasangaya) is a village and municipality in the Barda Rayon of Azerbaijan. It has a population of 1,324.
