= Həsənqaya, Aghdara =

Hasangaya / Haykajur Həsənqaya / Հայկաջուր
- Location within Azerbaijan
- Coordinates: 40°19′31″N 46°50′52″E
- Country: Azerbaijan
- District: Aghdara
- Time zone: UTC+4 (AZT)

Hasangaya (Azerbaijani: Həsənqaya) or Haykajur (Armenian: Հայկաջուր, also Margushevan) is a village in the Aghdara District of Azerbaijan, in the region of Nagorno-Karabakh.

== History ==
The village had an ethnic Armenian-majority population prior to the First Nagorno-Karabakh war when the village came under Azerbaijani control.

During the Soviet period, the village was located in the Mardakert District of the former Nagorno-Karabakh Autonomous Oblast.
