= Qarakeçdi =

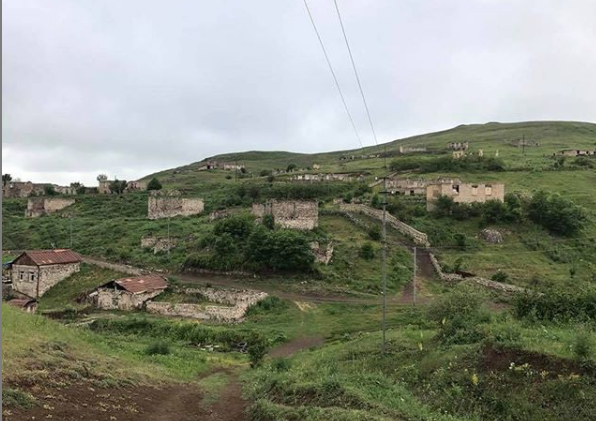

- Location within Azerbaijan Location within East Zangezur Economic Region
- Coordinates: 39°45′09″N 46°16′20″E
- Country: Azerbaijan
- District: Lachin

Population (2015)
  - Total: 56
- Time zone: UTC+4 (AZT)

Qarakeçdi (Garakechdi) is a village in the Lachin District of Azerbaijan.

== History ==
The village was known as Leninkend (Azerbaijani: Leninkənd) during the Soviet period until it was renamed in 1999 to Qarakeçdi.

The village was located in the Armenian-occupied territories surrounding Nagorno-Karabakh, coming under the control of ethnic Armenian forces in May 1992 during the First Nagorno-Karabakh War. The village subsequently became part of the breakaway Republic of Artsakh as part of its Kashatagh Province, referred to as Lernahovit (Armenian: Լեռնահովիտ), and previously Yeznagomer (Եզնագոմեր). It was returned to Azerbaijan as part of the 2020 Nagorno-Karabakh ceasefire agreement.
