= Semyonovsky (rural locality) =

Semyonovsky (Russian: Семёновский; masculine), Semyonovskaya (Семёновская; feminine), or Semyonovskoye (Семёновское; neuter) is the name of several rural localities in Russia.

== Republic of Bashkortostan ==
As of 2010, one rural locality in the Republic of Bashkortostan bears this name:

- Semyonovskoye, Republic of Bashkortostan, a selo in Semyonovsky Selsoviet of Baymaksky District

== Bryansk Oblast ==
As of 2010, one rural locality in Bryansk Oblast bears this name:

- Semyonovsky, Bryansk Oblast, a settlement in Supryaginsky Selsoviet of Pochepsky District

== Chuvash Republic ==
As of 2010, one rural locality in the Chuvash Republic bears this name:

- Semyonovskoye, Chuvash Republic, a selo in Semyonovskoye Rural Settlement of Poretsky District

== Irkutsk Oblast ==
As of 2010, one rural locality in Irkutsk Oblast bears this name:

- Semyonovskoye, Irkutsk Oblast, a selo in Zalarinsky District

== Ivanovo Oblast ==
As of 2010, four rural localities in Ivanovo Oblast bear this name:

- Semyonovskoye, Ilyinsky District, Ivanovo Oblast, a village in Ilyinsky District
- Semyonovskoye, Ivanovsky District, Ivanovo Oblast, a selo in Ivanovsky District
- Semyonovskoye, Vichugsky District, Ivanovo Oblast, a selo in Vichugsky District
- Semyonovskoye, Zavolzhsky District, Ivanovo Oblast, a selo in Zavolzhsky District

== Kaluga Oblast ==
As of 2010, five rural localities in Kaluga Oblast bear this name:

- Semyonovsky, Kaluga Oblast, a settlement in Khvastovichsky District
- Semyonovskoye (Orekhovnya Rural Settlement), Iznoskovsky District, Kaluga Oblast, a village in Iznoskovsky District; municipally, a part of Orekhovnya Rural Settlement of that district
- Semyonovskoye (Izvolsk Rural Settlement), Iznoskovsky District, Kaluga Oblast, a village in Iznoskovsky District; municipally, a part of Izvolsk Rural Settlement of that district
- Semyonovskoye (Khvoshchi Rural Settlement), Iznoskovsky District, Kaluga Oblast, a village in Iznoskovsky District; municipally, a part of Khvoshchi Rural Settlement of that district
- Semyonovskoye, Zhukovsky District, Kaluga Oblast, a village in Zhukovsky District

== Kemerovo Oblast ==
As of 2010, one rural locality in Kemerovo Oblast bears this name:

- Semyonovsky, Kemerovo Oblast, a settlement in Zvezdnaya Rural Territory of Kemerovsky District

== Kirov Oblast ==
As of 2010, three rural localities in Kirov Oblast bear this name:

- Semyonovsky, Kirov Oblast, a railway crossing loop under the administrative jurisdiction of the urban-type settlement of Leninskoye, Shabalinsky District
- Semyonovskoye, Kirov Oblast, a selo under the administrative jurisdiction of the urban-type settlement of Leninskoye, Shabalinsky District
- Semyonovskaya, Kirov Oblast, a village under the administrative jurisdiction of the urban-type settlement of Lalsk, Luzsky District

== Kostroma Oblast ==
As of 2010, four rural localities in Kostroma Oblast bear this name:

- Semyonovskoye, Buysky District, Kostroma Oblast, a village in Tsentralnoye Settlement of Buysky District
- Semyonovskoye, Galichsky District, Kostroma Oblast, a village in Stepanovskoye Settlement of Galichsky District
- Semyonovskoye, Nerekhtsky District, Kostroma Oblast, a selo in Prigorodnoye Settlement of Nerekhtsky District
- Semyonovskoye, Sudislavsky District, Kostroma Oblast, a village in Raslovskoye Settlement of Sudislavsky District

== Kursk Oblast ==
As of 2010, two rural localities in Kursk Oblast bear this name:

- Semyonovsky, Fatezhsky District, Kursk Oblast, a khutor in Kolychevsky Selsoviet of Fatezhsky District
- Semyonovsky, Kastorensky District, Kursk Oblast, a settlement in Tsvetochensky Selsoviet of Kastorensky District

== Moscow Oblast ==
As of 2010, fourteen rural localities in Moscow Oblast bear this name:

- Semyonovskoye, Dmitrovsky District, Moscow Oblast, a selo in Sinkovskoye Rural Settlement of Dmitrovsky District
- Semyonovskoye, Biorkovskoye Rural Settlement, Kolomensky District, Moscow Oblast, a village in Biorkovskoye Rural Settlement of Kolomensky District
- Semyonovskoye, Nepetsinskoye Rural Settlement, Kolomensky District, Moscow Oblast, a village in Nepetsinskoye Rural Settlement of Kolomensky District
- Semyonovskoye, Borodinskoye Rural Settlement, Mozhaysky District, Moscow Oblast, a village in Borodinskoye Rural Settlement of Mozhaysky District, Moscow Oblast
- Semyonovskoye, Zamoshinskoye Rural Settlement, Mozhaysky District, Moscow Oblast, a selo in Zamoshinskoye Rural Settlement of Mozhaysky District
- Semyonovskoye, Pushkinsky District, Moscow Oblast, a selo in Yeldiginskoye Rural Settlement of Pushkinsky District
- Semyonovskoye, Ramensky District, Moscow Oblast, a village in Nikonovskoye Rural Settlement of Ramensky District
- Semyonovskoye, Serpukhovsky District, Moscow Oblast, a village in Lipitskoye Rural Settlement of Serpukhovsky District
- Semyonovskoye, Stupinsky District, Moscow Oblast, a selo in Semyonovskoye Rural Settlement of Stupinsky District
- Semyonovskoye, Taldomsky District, Moscow Oblast, a village in Guslevskoye Rural Settlement of Taldomsky District
- Semyonovskaya, Krivandinskoye Rural Settlement, Shatursky District, Moscow Oblast, a village in Krivandinskoye Rural Settlement of Shatursky District
- Semyonovskaya, Pyshlitskoye Rural Settlement, Shatursky District, Moscow Oblast, a village in Pyshlitskoye Rural Settlement of Shatursky District
- Semyonovskaya, Misheronsky Work Settlement, Shatursky District, Moscow Oblast, a village under the administrative jurisdiction of the work settlement of Misheronsky, Shatursky District
- Semyonovskaya, Yegoryevsky District, Moscow Oblast, a village under the administrative jurisdiction of the town of Yegoryevsk, Yegoryevsky District

== Novgorod Oblast ==
As of 2010, one rural locality in Novgorod Oblast bears this name:

- Semyonovskoye, Novgorod Oblast, a village in Volokskoye Settlement of Borovichsky District

== Novosibirsk Oblast ==
As of 2010, three rural localities in Novosibirsk Oblast bear this name:

- Semyonovsky, Cherepanovsky District, Novosibirsk Oblast, a settlement in Cherepanovsky District
- Semyonovsky, Kochenyovsky District, Novosibirsk Oblast, a settlement in Kochenyovsky District
- Semyonovsky, Toguchinsky District, Novosibirsk Oblast, a settlement in Toguchinsky District

== Oryol Oblast ==
As of 2010, one rural locality in Oryol Oblast bears this name:

- Semyonovsky, Oryol Oblast, a settlement in Stolbishchensky Selsoviet of Dmitrovsky District

== Smolensk Oblast ==
As of 2010, five rural localities in Smolensk Oblast bear this name:

- Semyonovskoye, Kardymovsky District, Smolensk Oblast, a village in Berezkinskoye Rural Settlement of Kardymovsky District
- Semyonovskoye, Tyomkinsky District, Smolensk Oblast, a village in Medvedevskoye Rural Settlement of Tyomkinsky District
- Semyonovskoye, Khmelitskoye Rural Settlement, Vyazemsky District, Smolensk Oblast, a village in Khmelitskoye Rural Settlement of Vyazemsky District
- Semyonovskoye, Rossiyskoye Rural Settlement, Vyazemsky District, Smolensk Oblast, a village in Rossiyskoye Rural Settlement of Vyazemsky District
- Semyonovskaya, Smolensk Oblast, a village in Vasilyevskoye Rural Settlement of Tyomkinsky District

== Tambov Oblast ==
As of 2010, one rural locality in Tambov Oblast bears this name:

- Semyonovsky, Tambov Oblast, a settlement in Kamensky Selsoviet of Rzhaksinsky District

== Tver Oblast ==
As of 2010, twelve rural localities in Tver Oblast bear this name:

- Semyonovskoye, Kalininsky District, Tver Oblast, a village in Kalininsky District
- Semyonovskoye (Pisyakovskoye Rural Settlement), Kashinsky District, Tver Oblast, a village in Kashinsky District; municipally, a part of Pisyakovskoye Rural Settlement of that district
- Semyonovskoye (Bulatovskoye Rural Settlement), Kashinsky District, Tver Oblast, a village in Kashinsky District; municipally, a part of Bulatovskoye Rural Settlement of that district
- Semyonovskoye, Kesovogorsky District, Tver Oblast, a village in Kesovogorsky District
- Semyonovskoye, Krasnokholmsky District, Tver Oblast, a village in Krasnokholmsky District
- Semyonovskoye, Maksatikhinsky District, Tver Oblast, a khutor in Maksatikhinsky District
- Semyonovskoye, Nelidovsky District, Tver Oblast, a village in Nelidovsky District
- Semyonovskoye (Itomlya Rural Settlement), Rzhevsky District, Tver Oblast, a village in Rzhevsky District; municipally, a part of Itomlya Rural Settlement of that district
- Semyonovskoye (Pobeda Rural Settlement), Rzhevsky District, Tver Oblast, a village in Rzhevsky District; municipally, a part of Pobeda Rural Settlement of that district
- Semyonovskoye, Torzhoksky District, Tver Oblast, a village in Torzhoksky District
- Semyonovskoye, Zapadnodvinsky District, Tver Oblast, a village in Zapadnodvinsky District
- Semyonovskoye, Zubtsovsky District, Tver Oblast, a village in Zubtsovsky District

== Udmurt Republic ==
As of 2010, one rural locality in the Udmurt Republic bears this name:

- Semyonovsky, Udmurt Republic, a village in Kachkashursky Selsoviet of Glazovsky District

== Vladimir Oblast ==
As of 2010, two rural localities in Vladimir Oblast bear this name:

- Semyonovskoye, Kirzhachsky District, Vladimir Oblast, a selo in Kirzhachsky District
- Semyonovskoye, Sobinsky District, Vladimir Oblast, a selo in Sobinsky District

== Vologda Oblast ==
As of 2010, twenty-one rural localities in Vologda Oblast bear this name:

- Semyonovskoye, Gryazovetsky District, Vologda Oblast, a village in Ploskovsky Selsoviet of Gryazovetsky District
- Semyonovskoye, Mezhdurechensky District, Vologda Oblast, a village in Sukhonsky Selsoviet of Mezhdurechensky District
- Semyonovskoye, Ust-Kubinsky District, Vologda Oblast, a village in Mitensky Selsoviet of Ust-Kubinsky District
- Semyonovskoye, Novlensky Selsoviet, Vologodsky District, Vologda Oblast, a village in Novlensky Selsoviet of Vologodsky District
- Semyonovskoye, Podlesny Selsoviet, Vologodsky District, Vologda Oblast, a village in Podlesny Selsoviet of Vologodsky District
- Semyonovskaya, Babayevsky District, Vologda Oblast, a village in Novolukinsky Selsoviet of Babayevsky District
- Semyonovskaya, Baranovsky Selsoviet, Kaduysky District, Vologda Oblast, a village in Baranovsky Selsoviet of Kaduysky District
- Semyonovskaya, Nikolsky Selsoviet, Kaduysky District, Vologda Oblast, a village in Nikolsky Selsoviet of Kaduysky District
- Semyonovskaya, Azletsky Selsoviet, Kharovsky District, Vologda Oblast, a village in Azletsky Selsoviet of Kharovsky District
- Semyonovskaya, Kumzersky Selsoviet, Kharovsky District, Vologda Oblast, a village in Kumzersky Selsoviet of Kharovsky District
- Semyonovskaya, Shevnitsky Selsoviet, Kharovsky District, Vologda Oblast, a village in Shevnitsky Selsoviet of Kharovsky District
- Semyonovskaya, Slobodskoy Selsoviet, Kharovsky District, Vologda Oblast, a village in Slobodskoy Selsoviet of Kharovsky District
- Semyonovskaya, Kirillovsky District, Vologda Oblast, a village in Pechengsky Selsoviet of Kirillovsky District
- Semyonovskaya, Tarnogsky District, Vologda Oblast, a village in Zaborsky Selsoviet of Tarnogsky District
- Semyonovskaya, Totemsky District, Vologda Oblast, a village in Vozhbalsky Selsoviet of Totemsky District
- Semyonovskaya, Ivanovsky Selsoviet, Vashkinsky District, Vologda Oblast, a village in Ivanovsky Selsoviet of Vashkinsky District
- Semyonovskaya, Porechensky Selsoviet, Vashkinsky District, Vologda Oblast, a village in Porechensky Selsoviet of Vashkinsky District
- Semyonovskaya, Verkhovazhsky District, Vologda Oblast, a village in Lipetsky Selsoviet of Verkhovazhsky District
- Semyonovskaya, Beketovsky Selsoviet, Vozhegodsky District, Vologda Oblast, a village in Beketovsky Selsoviet of Vozhegodsky District
- Semyonovskaya, Maryinsky Selsoviet, Vozhegodsky District, Vologda Oblast, a village in Maryinsky Selsoviet of Vozhegodsky District
- Semyonovskaya, Vytegorsky District, Vologda Oblast, a village in Semyonovsky Selsoviet of Vytegorsky District

== Voronezh Oblast ==
As of 2010, one rural locality in Voronezh Oblast bears this name:

- Semyonovsky, Voronezh Oblast, a settlement in Buravtsovskoye Rural Settlement of Ertilsky District

== Yaroslavl Oblast ==
As of 2010, eleven rural localities in Yaroslavl Oblast bear this name:

- Semyonovskoye, Borisoglebsky District, Yaroslavl Oblast, a selo in Voshchazhnikovsky Rural Okrug of Borisoglebsky District
- Semyonovskoye, Breytovsky District, Yaroslavl Oblast, a selo in Pokrovo-Sitsky Rural Okrug of Breytovsky District
- Semyonovskoye, Danilovsky District, Yaroslavl Oblast, a village in Trofimovsky Rural Okrug of Danilovsky District
- Semyonovskoye, Nekrasovsky District, Yaroslavl Oblast, a village in Nikolsky Rural Okrug of Nekrasovsky District
- Semyonovskoye, Pervomaysky District, Yaroslavl Oblast, a selo in Semyonovsky Rural Okrug of Pervomaysky District
- Semyonovskoye, Rostovsky District, Yaroslavl Oblast, a village in Novo-Nikolsky Rural Okrug of Rostovsky District
- Semyonovskoye, Rybinsky District, Yaroslavl Oblast, a selo in Volzhsky Rural Okrug of Rybinsky District
- Semyonovskoye, Kurbsky Rural Okrug, Yaroslavsky District, Yaroslavl Oblast, a village in Kurbsky Rural Okrug of Yaroslavsky District
- Semyonovskoye, Levtsovsky Rural Okrug, Yaroslavsky District, Yaroslavl Oblast, a village in Levtsovsky Rural Okrug of Yaroslavsky District
- Semyonovskoye, Lyutovsky Rural Okrug, Yaroslavsky District, Yaroslavl Oblast, a village in Lyutovsky Rural Okrug of Yaroslavsky District
- Semyonovskoye, Mordvinovsky Rural Okrug, Yaroslavsky District, Yaroslavl Oblast, a village in Mordvinovsky Rural Okrug of Yaroslavsky District
