= Leninsky Urban Settlement =

Leninsky Urban Settlement or Leninskoye Urban Settlement is the name of several municipal formations in Russia.

== Modern urban settlements ==
- Leninsky Urban Settlement, Sakha Republic, a municipal formation which the Settlements of Leninsky and Lebediny in Aldansky District of the Sakha Republic are incorporated as
- Leninskoye Urban Settlement, a municipal formation which the Urban-Type Settlement of Leninskoye in Shabalinsky District of Kirov Oblast is incorporated as
- Leninskoye Urban Settlement, a municipal formation which imeni V. I. Lenina Settlement Okrug in Baryshsky District of Ulyanovsk Oblast is incorporated as

== Historical urban settlements ==
- Leninsky Urban Settlement, Tula Oblast, a former municipal formation which the Urban-Type Settlement of Leninsky and Barsukovsky Selsoviet in Leninsky District of Tula Oblast were incorporated as before being demoted in status to that of a rural settlement in May 2014

== See also ==
- Leninsky (disambiguation)
