= Leninsky =

Toponyms Leninsky (masculine), Leninskaya (feminine), or Leninskoye (neuter), named after Vladimir Lenin, may refer to:

== Geography ==
- Leninsky District (disambiguation), several districts in the countries of the former Soviet Union
- Leninsky Okrug (disambiguation), various divisions in Russia
- Leninsky Urban Settlement (or Leninskoye Urban Settlement), several municipal urban settlements in Russia
- Leninski, Belarus (Leninsky), a settlement in Belarus
- Leninsky, Russia (Leninskaya, Leninskoye), several inhabited localities in Russia
- Leninskoye, Kazakhstan, a locality in Aktobe Province, Kazakhstan

== Transportation ==
- Leninsky Avenue (disambiguation), several streets in Russian cities
- Leninskaya Line, a rapid transit line in Novosibirsk, Russia
- Leninskaya (Nizhny Novgorod Metro), a metro station in Nizhny Novgorod, Russia
- Leninska (Leninskaya), the former name of Teatralna station in Kyiv, Ukraine

== See also ==
- Leninske (disambiguation)
- Leninsk (disambiguation)
- List of places named after Vladimir Lenin
