= Leninsky, Russia =

Leninsky (Russian: Ленинский; masculine), Leninskaya (Ленинская; feminine), or Leninskoye (Ленинское; neuter) is the name of several inhabited localities in Russia.

Urban localities

- Leninsky, Sakha Republic, a settlement in Aldansky District of the Sakha Republic
- Leninskoye, Kirov Oblast, an urban-type settlement in Shabalinsky District of Kirov Oblast

Rural localities

- Leninsky, Altai Krai, a settlement in Troitsky District of Altai Krai
- Leninsky, Tula Oblast, a settlement in Barsukovsky Rural Okrug of Leninsky District of Tula Oblast
- Leninsky, several other rural localities
- Leninskoye, Altai Krai, a selo in Smolensky District of Altai Krai
- Leninskoye, Jewish Autonomous Oblast, a selo in Leninsky District of the Jewish Autonomous Oblast
- Leninskoye, several other rural localities

== See also ==
- Leninsk (disambiguation)
- List of places named after Vladimir Lenin
