= Bezvodny =

Bezvodny (Russian: Безво́дный; masculine), Bezvodnaya (Безво́дная; feminine), or Bezvodnoye (Безво́дное; neuter) is the name of several rural localities in Russia:

- Bezvodny, Chelyabinsk Oblast, a settlement in Tarasovsky Selsoviet of Chesmensky District of Chelyabinsk Oblast
- Bezvodny, Krasnodar Krai, a khutor in Moldavansky Rural Okrug of Krymsky District of Krasnodar Krai
- Bezvodnoye, Nolinsky District, Kirov Oblast, a village in Shvarikhinsky Rural Okrug of Nolinsky District of Kirov Oblast
- Bezvodnoye, Pizhansky District, Kirov Oblast, a village in Bezvodninsky Rural Okrug of Pizhansky District of Kirov Oblast
- Bezvodnoye, Yuryansky District, Kirov Oblast, a village in Ivanovsky Rural Okrug of Yuryansky District of Kirov Oblast
- Bezvodnoye, Republic of Mordovia, a selo in Kechushevsky Selsoviet of Ardatovsky District of the Republic of Mordovia
- Bezvodnoye, Ogibnovsky Selsoviet, Semyonov, Nizhny Novgorod Oblast, a village in Ogibnovsky Selsoviet of the city of oblast significance of Semyonov, Nizhny Novgorod Oblast
- Bezvodnoye, Shaldezhsky Selsoviet, Semyonov, Nizhny Novgorod Oblast, a village in Shaldezhsky Selsoviet of the city of oblast significance of Semyonov, Nizhny Novgorod Oblast
- Bezvodnoye, Shakhunya, Nizhny Novgorod Oblast, a village in Akatovsky Selsoviet of the city of oblast significance of Shakhunya, Nizhny Novgorod Oblast
- Bezvodnoye, Kumokhinsky Selsoviet, Gorodetsky District, Nizhny Novgorod Oblast, a village in Kumokhinsky Selsoviet of Gorodetsky District of Nizhny Novgorod Oblast
- Bezvodnoye, Nikolo-Pogostinsky Selsoviet, Gorodetsky District, Nizhny Novgorod Oblast, a village in Nikolo-Pogostinsky Selsoviet of Gorodetsky District of Nizhny Novgorod Oblast
- Bezvodnoye, Kstovsky District, Nizhny Novgorod Oblast, a selo in Bezvodninsky Selsoviet of Kstovsky District of Nizhny Novgorod Oblast
- Bezvodnoye, Tonkinsky District, Nizhny Novgorod Oblast, a village in Bolshesodomovsky Selsoviet of Tonkinsky District of Nizhny Novgorod Oblast
- Bezvodnoye, Urensky District, Nizhny Novgorod Oblast, a village in Bolshepesochninsky Selsoviet of Urensky District of Nizhny Novgorod Oblast
- Bezvodnoye, Nakhratovsky Selsoviet, Voskresensky District, Nizhny Novgorod Oblast, a village in Nakhratovsky Selsoviet of Voskresensky District of Nizhny Novgorod Oblast
- Bezvodnoye, Staroustinsky Selsoviet, Voskresensky District, Nizhny Novgorod Oblast, a village in Staroustinsky Selsoviet of Voskresensky District of Nizhny Novgorod Oblast
- Bezvodnoye, Penza Oblast, a selo in Alferyevsky Selsoviet of Penzensky District of Penza Oblast
- Bezvodnoye, Vladimir Oblast, a village in Sobinsky District of Vladimir Oblast
- Bezvodnaya, Republic of Adygea, a stanitsa in Maykopsky District of the Republic of Adygea
- Bezvodnaya, Kirov Oblast, a village under the administrative jurisdiction of the urban-type settlement of Leninskoye in Shabalinsky District of Kirov Oblast
