= Diocese of Birobidzhan =

Diocese of Birobidzhan and Kuldur Биробиджанская и Кульдурская епархия
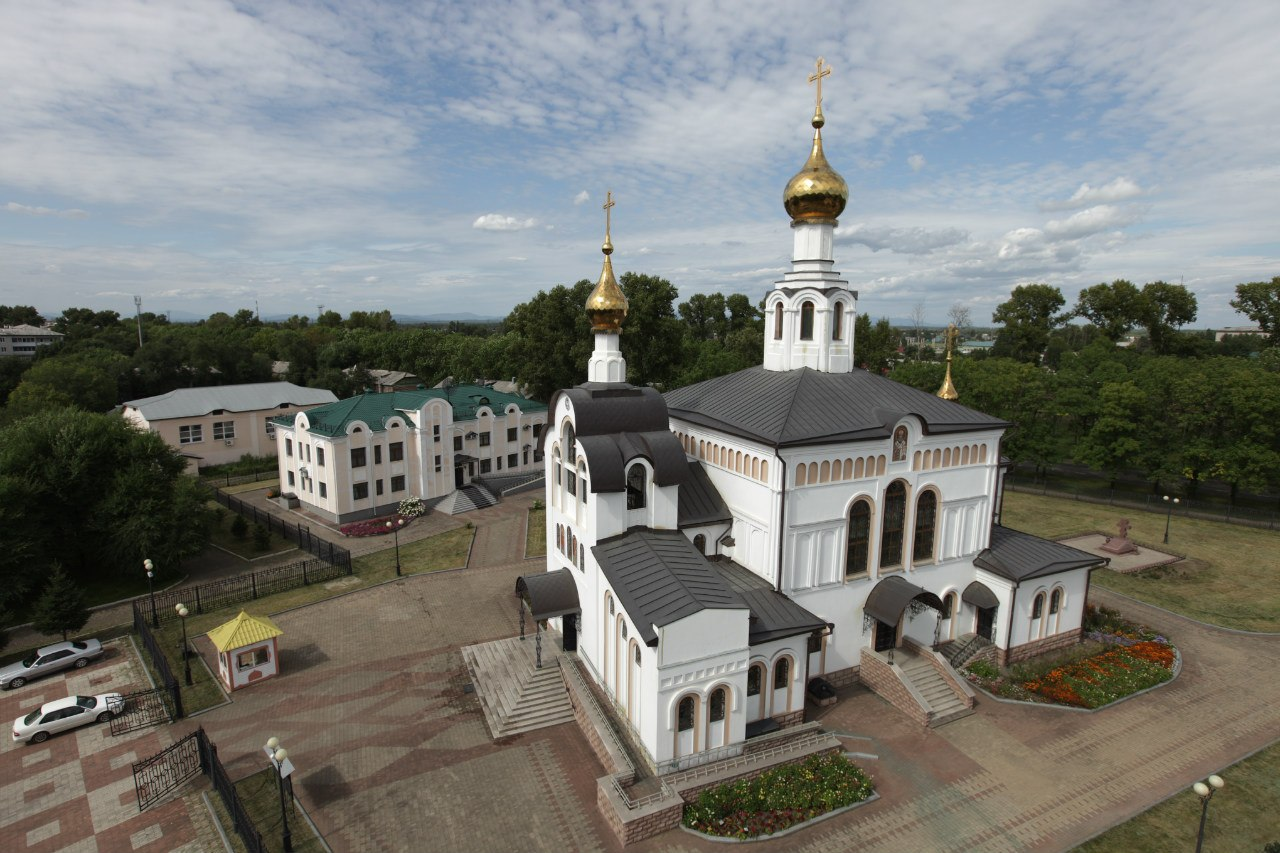
- Annunciation Cathedral

Location
- Country: Russia
- Territory: Jewish Autonomous Region
- Deaneries: 3

Statistics
- Area: 36,266 km^{2} (14,002 sq mi)
- Population: Total: (as of 2010); 172,671
- Parishes: 48

Information
- Established: October 7, 2002
- Cathedral: Annunciation Cathedral

Current leadership
- Archbishop: Joseph (Balabanov)

Map
- Diocese of Birobidzhan and Kuldur

Website
- www.eparh.ru

The Diocese of Birobidzhan and Kuldur (Биробиджанская и Кульдурская епархия) is a diocese of the Russian Orthodox Church, the centralized religious organization headed by Moscow Patriarchate. The diocese operates churches within the borders of the Jewish Autonomous Region which borders with China on the south, Amur Oblast on the west and Khabarovsk Krai on the northeast.

The cathedral church and the official seat of a diocesan bishop are located in the city of Birobidzhan.

The Birobidzhan diocese of the Russian Orthodox Church was founded by the resolution of the Patriarch of Moscow and All Russia Alexy II and the Holy Synod of the Russian Orthodox Church on October 7, 2002. The bishop of the Birobidzhan diocese is Joseph (Balabanov), who appointed by the decree of Patriarch of Moscow and All Russia Alexy II of October 7, 2002.

== Parish listing ==
=== Central deanery ===
The city of Birobidzhan

- Annunciation Cathedral
- Church of Saint Nicholas
- Chapel of the Our Lady "Derzhavnaya"
- Parish of Saint Pantaleon
- Parish of Our Lady of Kazan
- Parish of Blessed Xenia
- Home church and chapel of Saint Dmitry Donskoy
- Chapel of All Saints

Birobidzhan district

- Convent of Saint Innocent of Alaska (Razdolnoye)
- Church of Saint Sophia the Martyr (Valdgeym)
- Parish of the Forty Martyrs of Sebaste (Nayfeld)
- Parish of the Royal Martyrs (Dubovoye)
- Parish of Our Lady "The Inexhaustible Chalice" (Birofeld)
- Parish of Saint John the Warrior (Kirga)

=== West deanery ===
Obluchensky district

- Parish of the Transfiguration of Jesus (Obluchye)
- Parish of the Nativity of the Theotokos (Kuldur)
- Parish of the Presentation of the Lord (Teploozersk)
- Parish of the Martyrs Florus and Laurus (Izvestkovy)
- Temple of Saint Anastasia of Sirmium (Bira)
- Church of Saint Simeon (Budukan)
- Parish of the Holy Trinity (Pashkovo)
- Parish of Saint Seraphim of Sarov (Birakan)
- Parish of Blessed Matrona of Moscow (Hingansk)
- Parish of the Apostles Peter and Paul (Dvurechye)
- Parish of Our Lady Mother of God "Seeker of the Perished" (Budukan)
- Parish of Saint Spyridon of Trimythous (Bira)

=== Southeast deanery ===
Smidovichesky district

- Church of the Intercession of the Theotokos (Smidovich)
- Parish of Blessed Matrona of Moscow (Kluchevoye)
- Parish of Our Lady "Tender Feeling"(Peschanoye)
- Parish of Saint Nicholas (Nikolayevka)
- Parish of Our Lady of Saint Theodore (Volochayevka-1)
- Chapel of Our Lady "Softener of Evil Hearts" (Volochayevka-1)
- Parish of the Holy New Martyrs and Confessors of Russia (Priamursky)

Octyabrsky district

- Church of the Holy Prophet Elijah (Amurzet)
- Church of Saint Catherine of Alexandria (Yekaterino-Nikolskoye)

Leninsky district

- Church of Saint Michael the Archangel (Leninskoye)
- Parish of Saint George (Babstovo)
- Parish of Our Lady of Kazan (Dezhnyovo)
- Parish of Saint Lazarus of Bethany (Lazarevo)

=== Diocesan saints ===
- Archpriest Martyr Neil (Smirnov): February 8 (January 26), October 2 (September 19)
- Priest Martyr Demetrius (Rozanov): November 12 (November 25)
- Deacon Martyr Gregory (Samarin): June 28 (July 11)
- St. John the Martyr (Demidov): June 28 (July 11)
- Holy Martyr Dimitri (Vdovin): April 10 (April 23)
- Holy Martyr Paraskeva (Kochneva): March 26 (April 8)
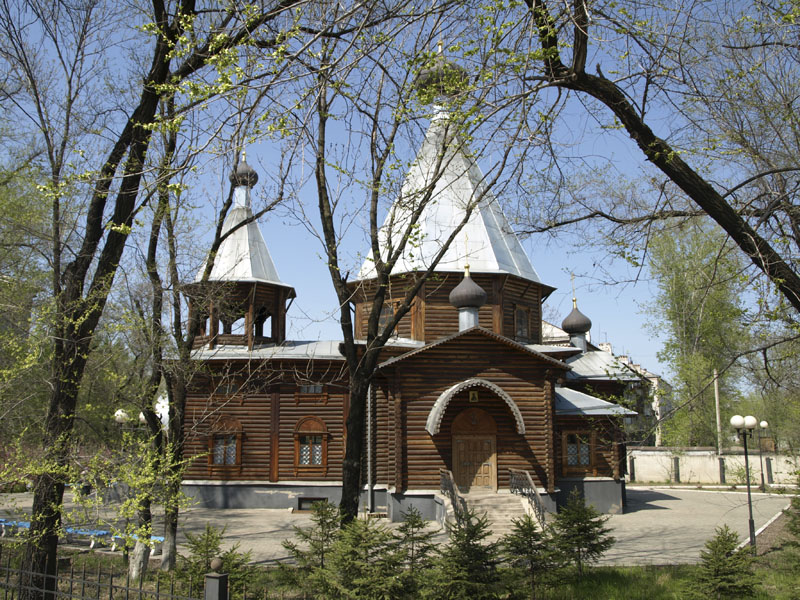
Saint Nicholas Church (Birobidzhan)

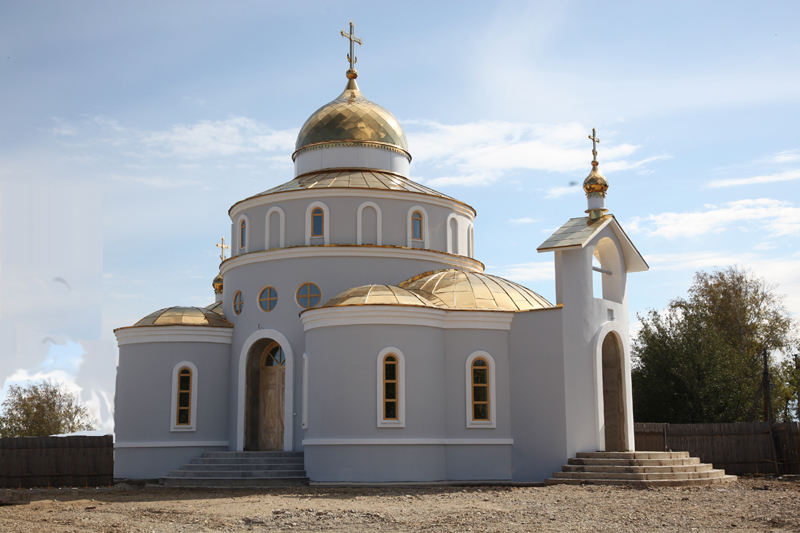
Temple of the Holy Martyrs Faith, Hope and Charity (Valdheim)

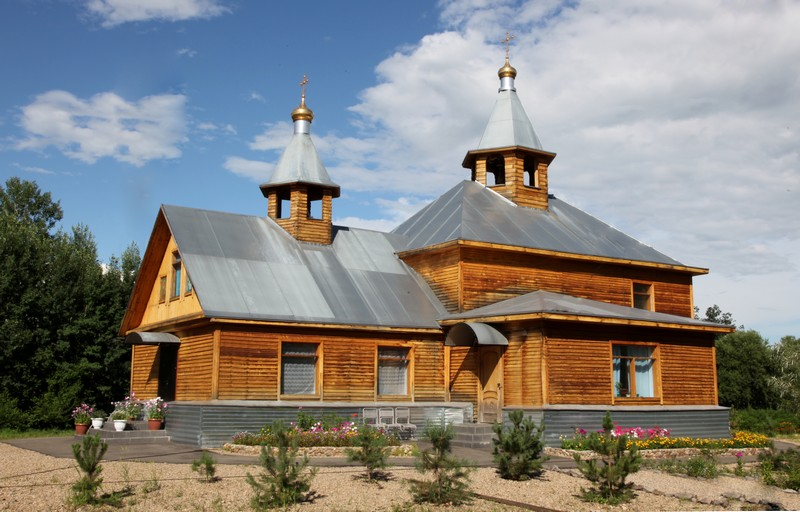
St. Innocent convent (Razdolnoye)

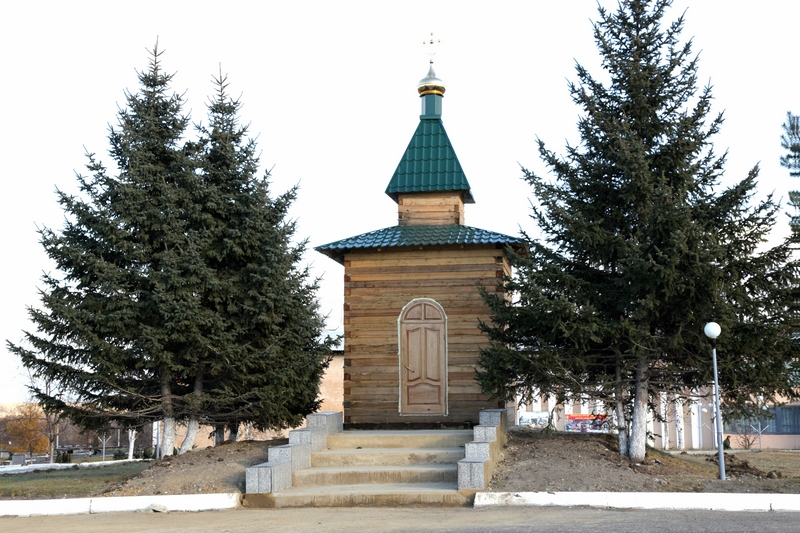
Chapel of St. Dmitry Donskoy (Birobidzhan)

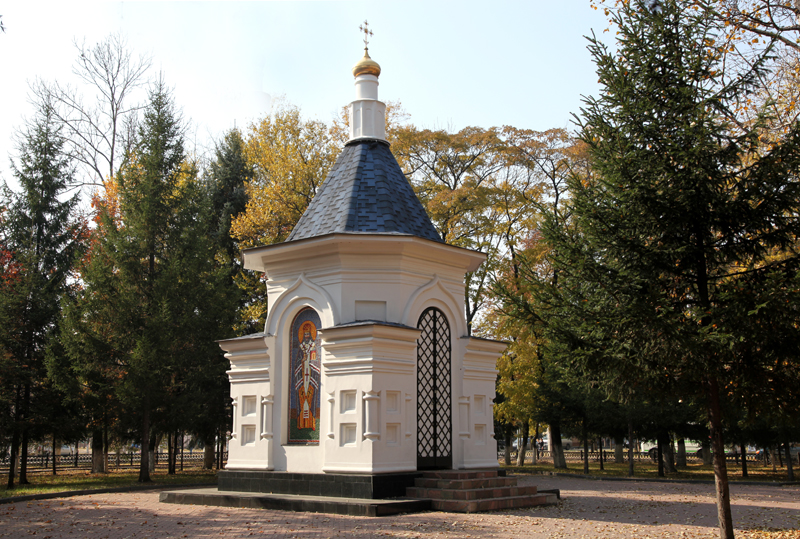
Chapel of the Reigning Icon (Birobidzhan)

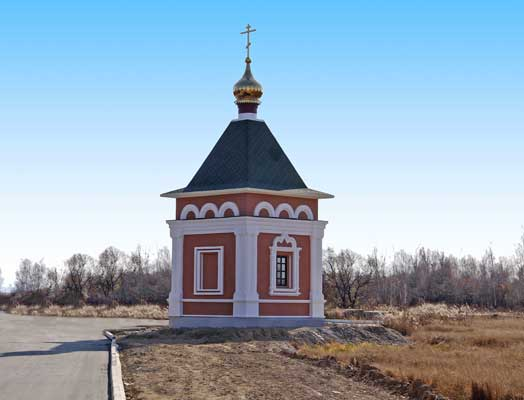
Chapel of All Saints (Birobidzhan)

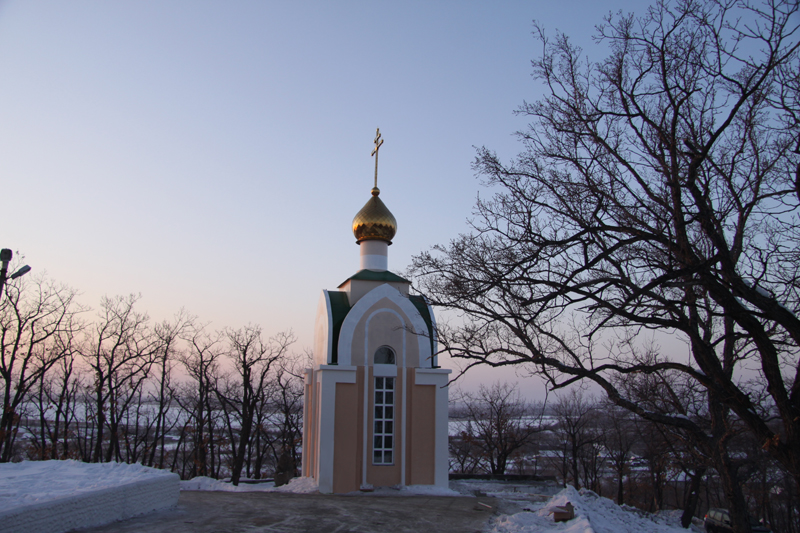
Chapel of Our Lady "Softener of Evil Hearts" (Volochayevka-1)

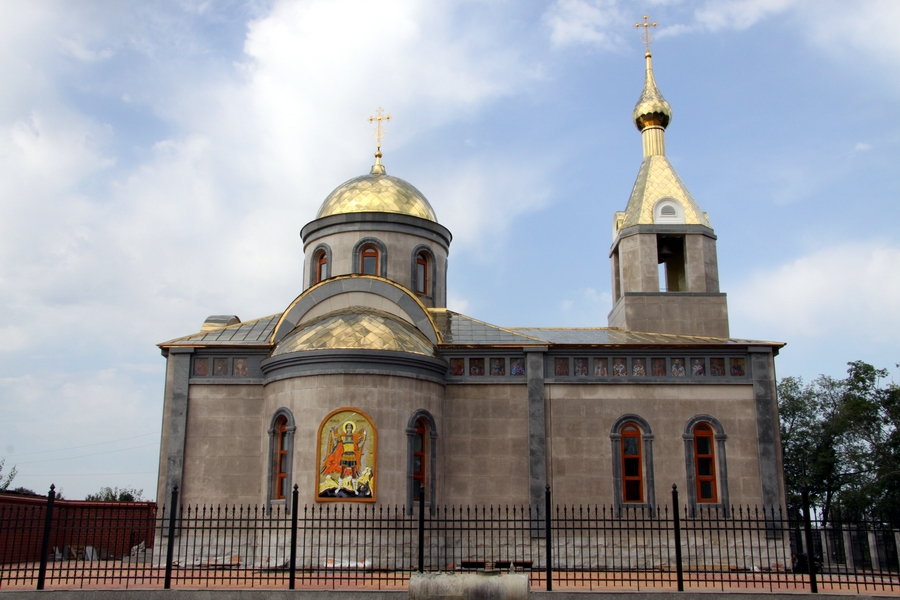
Church of St. Michael the Archangel (Leninskoye)

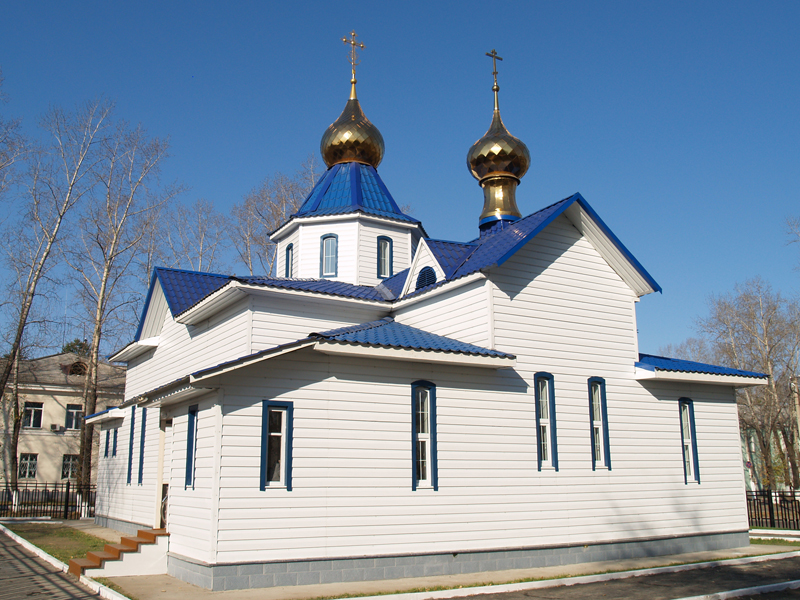
Church of St. Elijah (Amurzet)

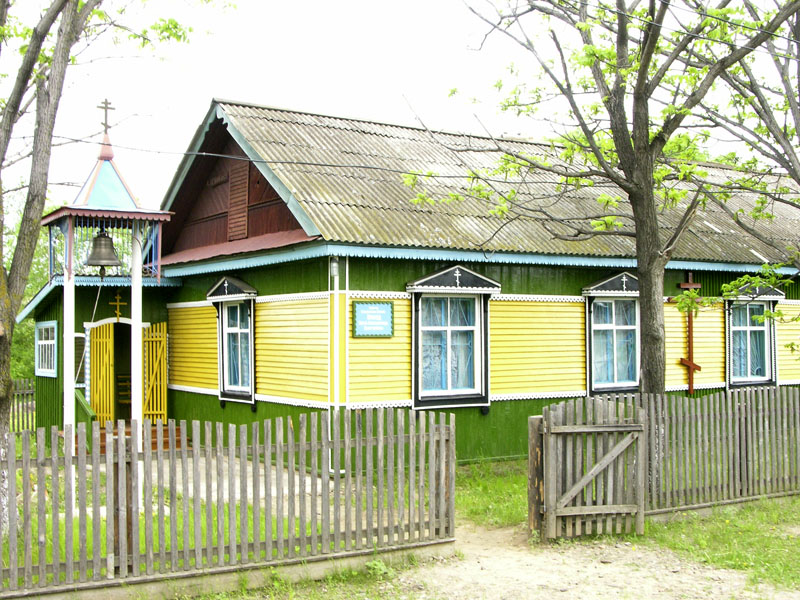
Church of St. Catherine (Yekaterino-Nikolskoye)
