= Lenina =

Lenina is a given name, and may refer to:

== People and characters ==
- Lenina Crowne, the female protagonist in Aldous Huxley's 1932 dystopian novel Brave New World
- Lenina Huxley, a character in the 1993 action movie Demolition Man

== Populated places ==
- The former name of Mariia, Ukraine
- Lenina, Bolshezhirovsky selsovet, Fatezhsky District, Kursk Oblast, Russia
- Lenina, Verkhnekhotemlsky selsovet, Fatezhsky District, Kursk Oblast, Russia
- Lenina, Volgograd Oblast, Russia

== Buildings ==
- Biblioteka Imeni Lenina
- Ploshchad Lenina (Saint Petersburg Metro)

== Other ==
- "Lenina", a song by British band The Vapors from their 1981 album Magnets
