= Shabalinsky =

Shabalinsky (masculine), Shabalinskaya (feminine), or Shabalinskoye (neuter) may refer to:

- Shabalinsky District, a district of Kirov Oblast, Russia
- Shabalinskoye, a rural locality (a village) in Kirov Oblast, Russia
