= Leninske =

Leninske may refer to:

- Former name of Valianivske, a rural settlement in Luhansk Oblast, Ukraine
- Former name of Pivdenne, Donetsk Oblast
- An alternative name of Uzhivka, Donetsk Oblast

== See also ==
- Lenina (disambiguation)
- Leninsky (disambiguation)
- List of places named after Vladimir Lenin
