= Leninsky District =

Leninsky District may refer to:

- Leninsky District, Russia, name of several districts and city districts in Russia
- Lenin District, Bishkek, a city district of Bishkek, Kyrgyzstan
- Leninsky District, Minsk, a city district (raion) of Minsk, Belarus
- Leninsky District, name of Rudaki District, Tajikistan, in 1970–2003

== See also ==
- Lenin Raion (disambiguation)
- Leninsk (disambiguation)
- Leninsky (disambiguation)
- Oleninsky District
