= Semyonovsky =

Semyonovsky (masculine), Semyonovskaya (feminine), or Semyonovskoye (neuter) may refer to:

== Places in Russia ==
- Semyonovsky District, former district of Nizhny Novgorod Oblast, Russia
- Semyonovsky Urban Okrug, a municipal formation of Nizhny Novgorod Oblast, which the town of Semyonov is incorporated as
- Semyonovsky Municipal Okrug, a municipal okrug of Admiralteysky District of St. Petersburg
- Semyonovsky (rural locality) (Semyonovskaya, Semyonovskoye), name of several rural localities
- Semyonovskaya (Moscow Metro), a station of the Moscow Metro in Moscow
- Semyonovsky Island

== Other uses ==
- Semyonovsky Life Guards Regiment, a guards regiment in the Imperial Russian Army
- Evgenia Semenovskaya (1895 – 1976), a Russian ophthalmologist and politician
