= Lenin Raion =

Lenin Raion is a popular Russian toponym of several city districts in Ukraine commemorating the Russian politician Vladimir Lenin.

It may refer to

== Ukraine ==
- Lenin Raion, Donetsk
- Lenin Raion, Luhansk
- Lenin Raion, Sevastopol

== See also ==
- Illich Raion
- Leninsky District (disambiguation)
