= Leninsky Okrug =

Leninsky Okrug may refer to:

- Leninsky Okrug, Kaluga, a division of the city of Kaluga, Russia
- Leninsky Administrative Okrug, Murmansk, a division of the city of Murmansk, Russia
- Leninsky Administrative Okrug, Omsk, a division of the city of Omsk, Russia
- Leninsky Administrative Okrug, Tyumen, a division of the city of Tyumen, Russia
- Leninsky Okrug, Komsomolsk-on-Amur (otherwise known as Dzyomgi), a division of the city of Komsomolsk-on-Amur
