= Leninsk, Russia =

Leninsk (Russian: Ленинск) is the name of several inhabited localities in Russia.

== Modern inhabited localities ==
Urban localities

- Leninsk, Volgograd Oblast, a town in Leninsky District of Volgograd Oblast; administratively incorporated as a town of district significance

Rural localities

- Leninsk, Chelyabinsk Oblast, a settlement under the administrative jurisdiction of the City of Miass, Chelyabinsk Oblast
- Leninsk, Jewish Autonomous Oblast, a station in Leninsky District of the Jewish Autonomous Oblast
- Leninsk, Omsk Oblast, a village in Krestinsky Rural Okrug of Okoneshnikovsky District of Omsk Oblast
- Leninsk, Perm Krai, a selo in Kudymkarsky District of Perm Krai

== Historical entities ==
Abolished inhabited localities

- Leninsk, a former urban-type settlement in Chelyabinsk Oblast; since 2005—a part of the city of Miass

Renamed inhabited localities

- Leninsk, name of the town of Taldom in 1918–1929
