= Semyonovskaya, Beketovsky Selsoviet, Vozhegodsky District, Vologda Oblast =

Semyonovskaya Семёновская
- Village
- Location within Vologda Oblast Location within Russia
- Coordinates: 60°36′N 39°13′E
- Country: Russia
- Region: Vologda Oblast
- District: Vozhegodsky District
- Time zone: UTC+3:00

Semyonovskaya (Russian: Семёновская) is a rural locality (a village) in Beketovskoye Rural Settlement, Vozhegodsky District, Vologda Oblast, Russia. The population was 3 as of 2002.

== Geography ==
The distance to Vozhega is 68 km, to Beketovskaya is 16 km. Barkanovskaya, Miguyevskaya, Vershina are the nearest rural localities.
