= Semyonovsky, Voronezh Oblast =

Semyonovsky Семёновский
- Settlement
- Location within Voronezh Oblast Location within Russia
- Coordinates: 51°39′N 40°53′E
- Country: Russia
- Region: Voronezh Oblast
- District: Ertilsky District
- Time zone: UTC+3:00

Semyonovsky (Russian: Семёновский) is a rural locality (a settlement) in Buravtsovskoye Rural Settlement, Ertilsky District, Voronezh Oblast, Russia. The population was 68 as of 2010. There are 2 streets.

== Geography ==
Semyonovsky is located 24 km south of Ertil (the district's administrative centre) by road. Rostoshi is the nearest rural locality.
