= Joseph Balabanov =

Russian Orthodox bishop

His Eminence Joseph
- Metropolitan of Ulan-Ude and Buryatia
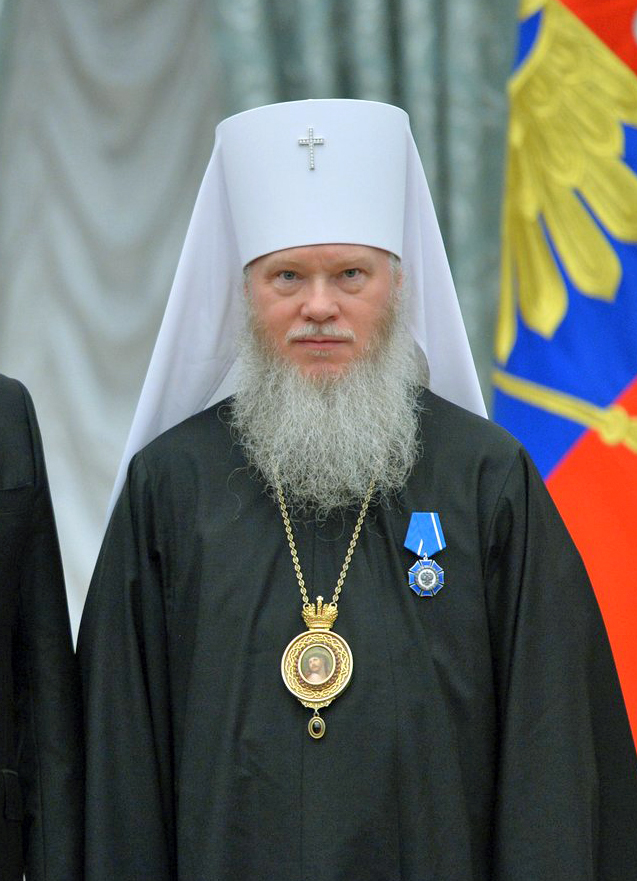
- Appointed: May 5, 2015
- Installed: May 24, 2015
- Other posts: Bishop of Uglich, vicar Yaroslavl diocese (January 1999—October 2002); Archbishop of Birobidzhan and Kuldur (October 2002—May 2015)

Orders
- Ordination: April 23, 1981 by Juvenal (Poyarkov)
- Consecration: January 31, 1999 by Alexy II of Moscow

Personal details
- Born: Igor Balabanov; 31 January 1954 (age 72) Kashira, Moscow Oblast, Russia
- Denomination: Orthodoxy
- Residence: Kurgan
- Parents: Anatoly Balabanov; Nadezhda Balabanova
- Profession: Theologian
- Education: Moscow Theological Seminary

Metropolitan Joseph (Russian: Митрополит Иосиф, secular name Igor Anatolievich Balabanov, Russian: Игорь Анатольевич Балабанов; born January 31, 1954) is a Russian Orthodox bishop, metropolitan of Ulan-Ude and Buryatia. His Name Day is on the Monday of Holy Week.

== Biography ==
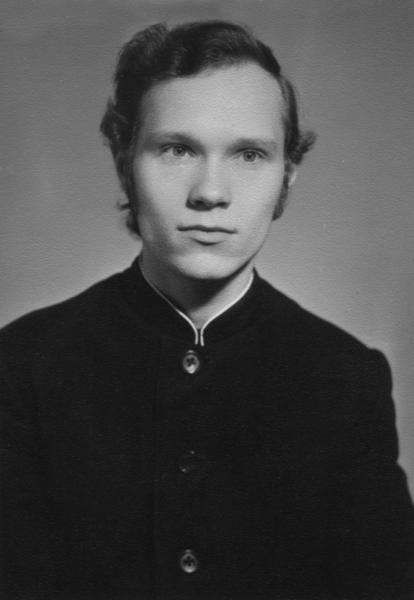
Future Archbishop

=== Early life and education ===
Igor Balabanov was born and spent his childhood in the old city of Kashira (Moscow region). His father, Anatoly Balabanov, died in 2001. His mother, Nadezhda Balabanova, died in 1999. According to the family tradition, 40 days after birth the child was baptized in the church of the Holy Martyrs Florus and Laurus in Kashira—the only church that was open in those days in the city. From his early childhood Igor served in this church under the guidance of nun Angelina—today Mother Macaria, the prioress of the Makarievo-Pisemsky monastery located in the diocese of Kostroma and Galich—a very strict and demanding woman taught an altar boy everything she knew about church services.

After ten years of high school, he served in the military in Smolensk. In 1975, after leaving the army, he entered the Moscow Theological Seminary. After the first year of education he received only excellent grades, and thus was immediately transferred to the third class, and in 1978, after graduation from the seminary, he was admitted to the Moscow Theological Academy without sitting for entrance examinations.

=== Ordination ===
On March 5, 1979 Metropolitan Juvenal tonsured him with the name of Joseph after the righteous Patriarch Joseph in the Church of the Holy Prince Daniel of Moscow in Novodevichy Convent. On March 9 that year, Metropolitan Juvenal ordained monk Joseph as a deacon and on July 26, Patriarch of Moscow and All Russia Pimen assigned deacon Joseph to a full-time service position at the Church of the Assumption in Novodevichy Convent.

On April 23, 1981, on Holy Thursday, monk Joseph was ordained to the priesthood by Metropolitan Juvenal. In 1982, on the feast of the Annunciation, he was awarded a pectoral cross.

On September 15, 1982, by the directive of Pimen he was placed at the service of Metropolitan of Krutitsa and Kolomna Juvenal. Two weeks later on September 30, Metropolitan Juvenal appointed Joseph pastor of the Ilyinsky temple in the city of Serpukhov, Moscow region.

The following year on July 13, hieromonk Joseph was assigned as the dean of Serpukhov circuit, consisting of Serpukhovsky, Chekhovsky and Narofominsky districts. He held this position until 1999. The revival of traditional styles of worship; the construction of new churches and monasteries or the restoration of existing places of worship; and development of religious life in all its forms, became the main objectives of the new dean.

=== Revival of the Vysotsky monastery ===
On March 19, 1984, hieromonk Joseph became hegumen of the Ilinsky Church. Under his guidance the church underwent extensive external and internal restoration. The restoration included the construction of a new two-story brick building, replacement of plumbing systems and placement of an iron fence around the precinct. But most importantly the new hegumen turned out to be the first bishop who was able to end longstanding conflicts and unite all the clergy and believers around the parish. On November 22, 1987, hieromonk Joseph received four awards and was elevated to the rank of archimandrite by Patriarch Pimen.

In early June 1990, he took part in the Local Council of the Russian Orthodox Church as delegate from the diocesan clergy of the city of Moscow, when the Patriarch of Moscow and All Russia was elected Metropolitan of Leningrad Alexis (Ridiger). The same year Archimandrite Joseph was elected as a member of the City Council of Serpukhov. As a member of the city council he has done everything possible to return to the Church all its monasteries and churches, including the Vysotsky monastery located right in the centre of Serpukhov.

On February 28, 1991, Alexy II and the Holy Synod made Archimandrite Joseph hegumen of the Vysotsky Monastery, with the right to deliver services with crozier. He worked to revive this ancient monastery, founded by Sergius of Radonezh in 1374.

At the initiative of the hegumen there was continued the veneration of the miraculous icon of the Mother of God "The Inexhaustible Cup", venerated in many parishes of the Russian Orthodox Church, with akathist to the Mother of God read daily before this icon. The first edition of the akathist to the Theotokos "The Inexhaustible Cup" was made by Bishop Joseph based on the only copy of the akathist left by an unknown old woman.

In 1993 Archimandrite Joseph was elected as a member of the Diocesan Council of the Moscow diocese. On September 25, 1995, Patriarch of Moscow and All Russia Alexy II, during his visit to the Vysotsky Monastery, awarded Joseph with the Order of St. Sergius. On March 28, 1996, Alexy bestowed on him the right to celebrate Divine Liturgy with open royal gates.

=== Episcopal ministry in the city of Yaroslavl ===
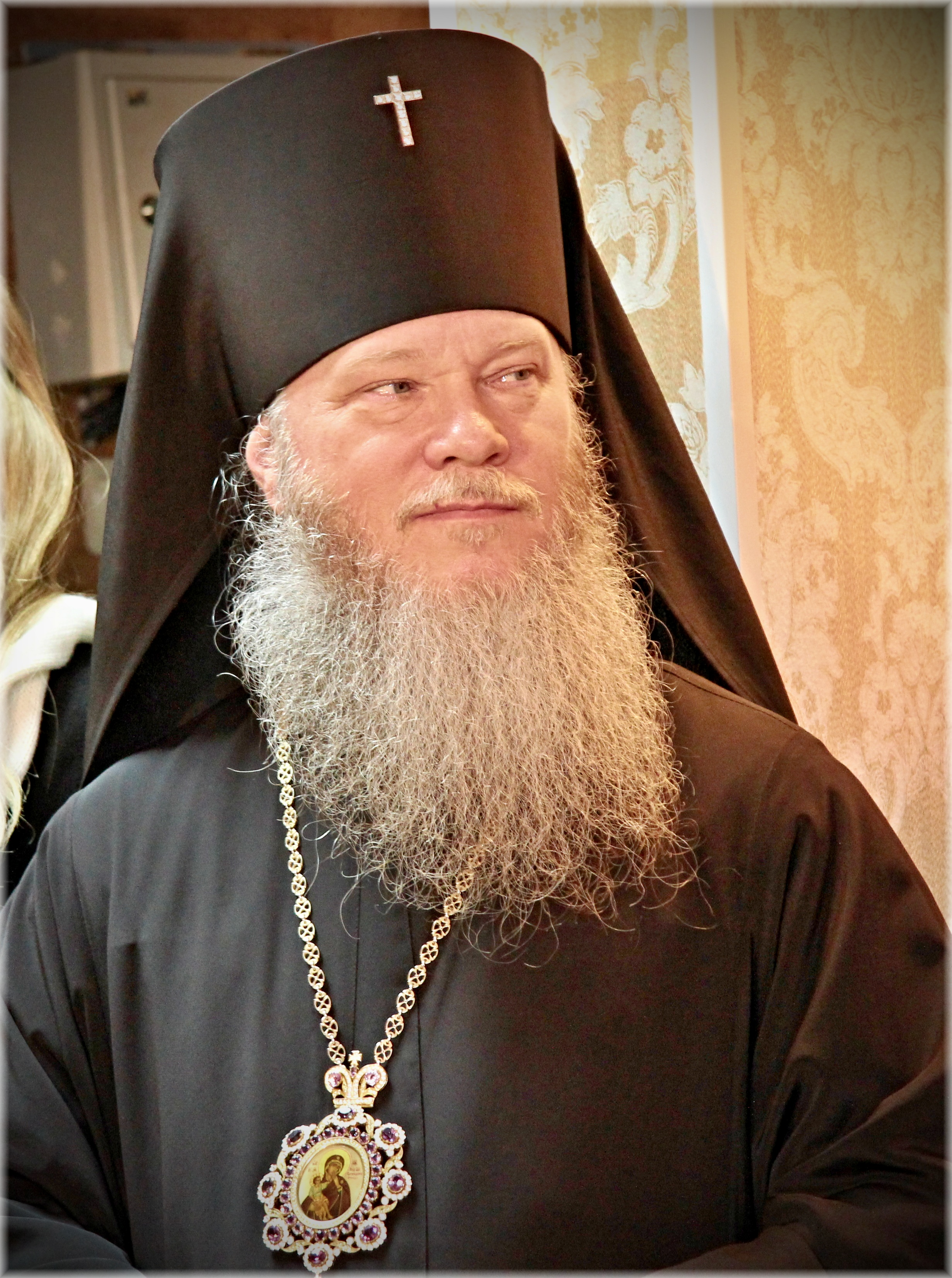
Archbishop Joseph

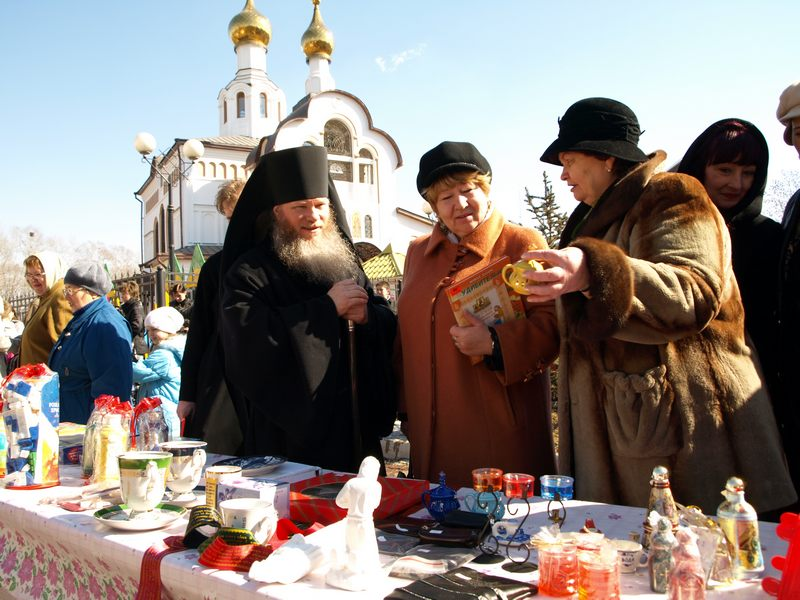
Archbishop Joseph at the festival "Great Maslenitsa" in Birobidzhan

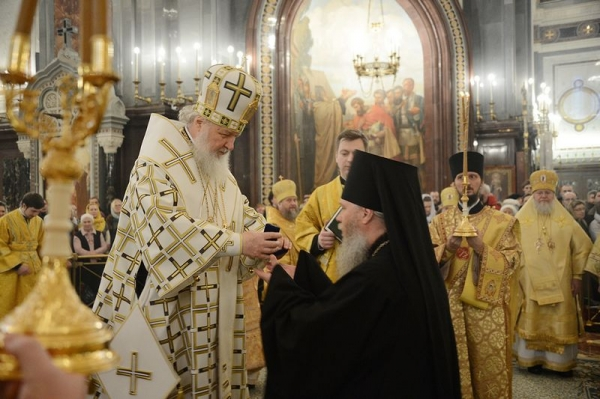
Elevation to the rank of archbishop

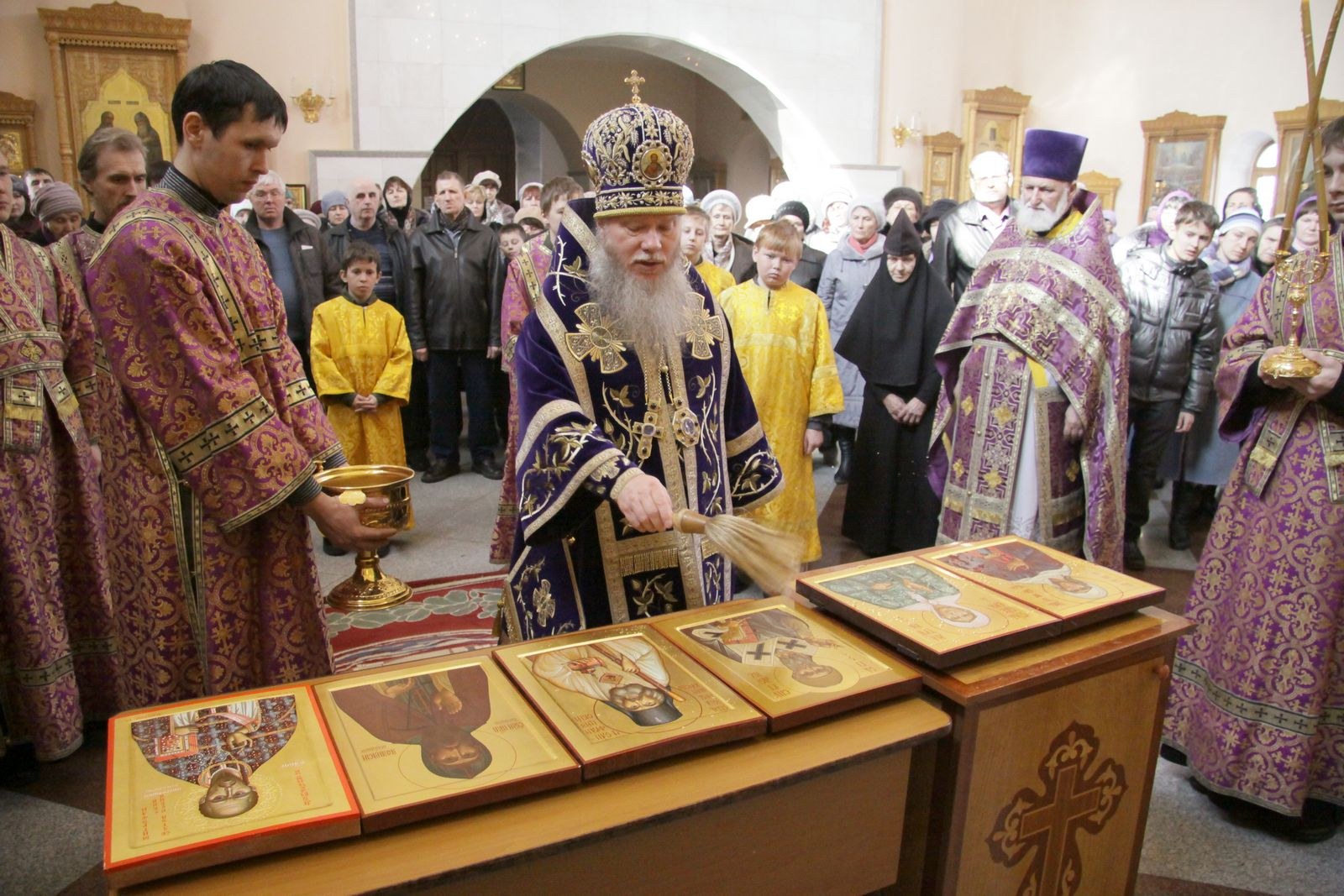
Archbishop Joseph sanctifying new icons for the church in Birobidzhan

On December 28, 1998, Alexy II and the Holy Synod elected Joseph as Bishop of Uglich, vicar of the Diocese of Yaroslavl. His episcopal ordination took place in the Epiphany Cathedral at Yelokhovo on January 31, 1999.

From February 1999, Bishop Joseph carried out his episcopal duties in the old city of Yaroslavl. By the directive of Alexy II, Bishop Joseph served also as vicar of the diocese, where he worked to build new churches and monasteries and to revive abandoned temples. A temple of the Epiphany built in the 17th century was renovated and finally transferred to the Diocese of Yaroslavl and Rostov. For a long time the temple building was closed for worships and was used as a museum. The Great Consecration of the temple was the final point of his episcopal ministry in the city of Yaroslavl.

=== Episcopal ministry in the city of Birobidzhan ===
Alexy II and the Holy Synod made Joseph bishop of a newly founded diocese located within the borders of the Jewish Autonomous Oblast in the Russian Far East on October 7, 2002.

In 2003-2005 Bishop Joseph led construction work on the first cathedral in history of Birobidzhan. On September 21, 2005, the cathedral in honor of the Annunciation was completed. The day of the consecration of the cathedral, Joseph was awarded the Order of St. Innocent, Metropolitan of Moscow and Kolomna (second class). In 2006, a Socio-Educational Center was built at the east side of the cathedral precinct. In ten years dozens of churches were built all over the region, including the Convent of Saint Innocent in Razdolnoye and two temples in correctional facilities.

Throughout his career Bishop Joseph received non-Church awards. An order of the Minister of Justice on January 22, 2002, awarded Joseph the medal "For strengthening of the penal system" (second class). A decree of the President of the Russian Federation Vladimir Putin on August 8, 2005, awarded Joseph the Order For Merit to the Fatherland (second class). February 12, 2007, by the order of the Federal Penitentiary Service of Russia he was awarded the medal "For strengthening of the penal system" (first class). A decree of President Dmitry Medvedev on April 29, 2009, awarded Joseph the Order of Friendship "For great personal contribution to the spiritual and cultural traditions and strengthening friendship between peoples". On October 1, 2012, the governor of the Jewish Autonomous Region Alexander Vinnikov bestowed on Bishop Joseph the Jewish Autonomous Region Award Honorable Medal "Honor and Respect".

On February 3, 2013, Joseph was elevated to the rank of archbishop.

=== Episcopal ministry in the city of Kurgan ===
On 5 May 2015, Joseph was appointed the ruling Bishop of the Diocese of Kurgan with the title "of Kurgan and Belozerskoye" and the head of the Metropolis of Kurgan. On 24 May 2015 he was elevated to the rank of metropolitan bishop at the Cathedral of Christ the Savior in Moscow.

On 30 August 2019, by the decision of the Holy Synod, he was appointed Metropolitan of Simbirsk and Novospasskoye, head of the Metropolis of Simbirsk.

On 25 August 2020, by the decision of the Holy Synod, he was appointed Metropolitan of Ulan-Ude and Buryatiya, head of the Metropolis of Buryatiya.

== Honours and awards ==
=== Church awards ===
- Order of St. Sergius of Radonezh, 2nd class, 1995
- Order of St. Innocent Metropolitan of Moscow and Kolomna, 2nd class, 2005
- A right to celebrate Divine Liturgy with open royal doors, 1996
- Pectoral cross, 1982
- Certificate of Honour, 1980

=== State awards ===
- Order of Honour, 2015
- Order of Friendship, 2009 (for great personal contribution to the spiritual and cultural traditions and strengthening friendship between peoples)
- Medal of the Order "For Merit to the Fatherland", 2nd Class, 2005
- Medal "For strengthening the prison system", 1st Class, 2007
- Medal "For strengthening the prison system", 2nd Class, 2002
- Jewish Autonomous Region Honorable Medal "Honor and Respect", 2012
