= Semyonovskoye, Republic of Bashkortostan =

Semyonovskoye Семёновское
- Selo
- Location within Bashkortostan Location within Russia
- Coordinates: 52°30′N 58°13′E
- Country: Russia
- Region: Bashkortostan
- District: Baymaksky District
- Time zone: UTC+5:00

Semyonovskoye (Russian: Семёновское) is a rural locality (a selo) and the administrative centre of Semyonovsky Selsoviet, Baymaksky District, Bashkortostan, Russia. The population was 276 as of 2010.

== Geography ==
Semyonovskoye is located 11 km south of Baymak (the district's administrative centre) by road. Munasipovo is the nearest rural locality.
