= Leninsky Okrug, Komsomolsk-on-Amur =

City district of Komsomolsk-on-Amur, Russia

Leninsky Okrug Ленинский округ
- City district (Okrug)
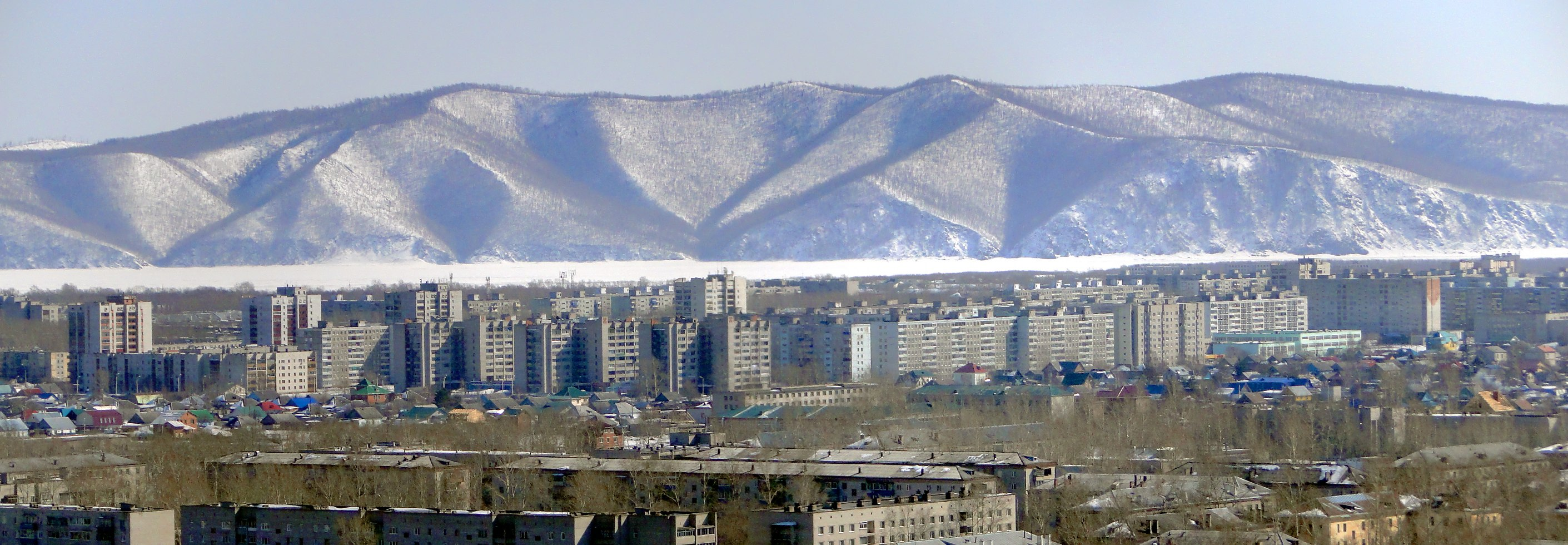
- Skyline
- Interactive map of Leninsky Okrug
- Coordinates: 50°36′03″N 137°04′41″E
- Country: Russia
- Federal subject: Khabarovsk Krai
- City of krai significance: Komsomolsk-on-Amur
- Settled: 1934
- Formally established: October 19, 1943
- Microdistricts: Dzyomgi, Mendeleyeva, imeni Popova, Kalininskiy

Leninsky Okrug (Russian: Ленинский округ), historically and colloquially known as Dzyomgi (Russian: Дзёмги), is one of the two administrative city districts (okrugs) comprising Komsomolsk-on-Amur, a major industrial city in Khabarovsk Krai, Russia. Located on the northeast side of the city along the left bank of the Amur River, it functions as one of the most critical aerospace and defense manufacturing hubs in the Russian Far East.

The district is geographically separated from the southwestern "Center" district (Tsentralny Okrug) by the Silinka River. While the city center historically developed around naval shipyards, Leninsky Okrug evolved strictly as an aviation-centric micro-city.

== Etymology and indigenous roots ==
Prior to Soviet urbanization in the 1930s, the left bank of the Amur loop was populated by the indigenous Nanai people (historically referred to as Golds). The colloquial name "Dzyomgi" (alternative spelling: Dzemgi) is derived from the native Nanai language, translating directly to mean "wooden house", "clan dwelling", or "birch grove". The modern industrial district was erected over and adjacent to a historical seasonal Nanai settlement that counted 5 households and 44 residents during the 1897 census.

== History ==
The modern foundation of the district began in the early 1930s due to Soviet strategic industrialization. On July 18, 1934, construction officially commenced on a massive state aviation manufacturing plant initially designated as GAZ 126. To house the thousands of engineers, Komsomol volunteers, and laborers arriving to operate the facility, residential neighborhoods were built incrementally around the factory walls, isolated from the southern shipyard zones.

On October 19, 1943, by decree of the Presidium of the Supreme Soviet of the RSFSR, the urbanized territory was formally organized into the "Leninsky District" alongside the Stalinsky and Central districts. District divisions were temporarily abolished in August 1957, but on March 31, 1972, the Presidium re-established the boundary lines, dividing the city permanently along the Silinka River into the Center and Leninsky (Dzyomgi) districts.

== Aerospace and defense infrastructure ==
=== Dzyomgi Airfield ===
Operating as a joint-use military air base and experimental factory flight-testing field, Dzyomgi Airport serves as the core logistics asset of the district. The airfield features a unique heavy-duty runway configuration engineered with an active industrial railway crossing cutting directly through the tarmac surface. The facility routinely handles heavy long-range transport crafts alongside state combat units.

=== 23rd Fighter Aviation Regiment ===
The base serves as the home terminal for the 23rd Guards Fighter Aviation Regiment (operating under the 303rd Composite Aviation Division). The tactical air group operates mainline front-line air superiority fighters including the Sukhoi Su-30M2/SM and the Sukhoi Su-35S. The regiment carries an elite honorary "Guards" designation issued by state military decree.

=== Aircraft manufacturing ===
Leninsky Okrug houses the principal assembly facilities of the Komsomolsk-on-Amur Aircraft Plant (KnAAZ), named after Yuri Gagarin. Notable manufacturing programs hosted in the district include:

- Sukhoi Superjet 100: Final assembly workshops for Russia's domestic regional passenger jet program are located entirely within the Leninsky complex.
- Sukhoi Su-57: Full-scale serial production of the fifth-generation stealth fighter commenced at the plant in January 2010. High concentrations of the operational fleet utilize the integrated Dzyomgi airfield infrastructure for testing, factory upgrade profiles, and combat readiness checkouts.

== Culture and landmarks ==
- Cathedral of the Holy Prophet Elijah: A multi-domed Eastern Orthodox cathedral erected in Leninsky Okrug in 2007 to serve the district's industrial workforce.
- Dzomgi Complex: Located on Orekhova Street, this specialized commercial hospitality facility and boutique hotel serves as a major venue for local civic gatherings and corporate accommodation, intentionally insulated from the noise of the adjacent heavy machinery zones.

== See also ==
- Komsomolsk-on-Amur Aircraft Plant
- Tsentralny Okrug, Komsomolsk-on-Amur
