= Semyonovskaya, Vytegorsky District, Vologda Oblast =

Semyonovskaya Семёновская
- Village
- Location within Vologda Oblast Location within Russia
- Coordinates: 60°35′N 36°49′E
- Country: Russia
- Region: Vologda Oblast
- District: Vytegorsky District
- Time zone: UTC+3:00

Semyonovskaya (Russian: Семёновская) is a rural locality (a village) in Almozerskoye Rural Settlement, Vytegorsky District, Vologda Oblast, Russia. The population was 22 as of 2002.

== Geography ==
Semyonovskaya is located 68 km south of Vytegra (the district's administrative centre) by road. Karpovskaya is the nearest rural locality.
