= Semyonovskoye, Novlensky Selsoviet, Vologodsky District, Vologda Oblast =

Semyonovskoye Семёновское
- Village
- Location within Vologda Oblast Location within Russia
- Coordinates: 59°37′N 39°16′E
- Country: Russia
- Region: Vologda Oblast
- District: Vologodsky District
- Time zone: UTC+3:00

Semyonovskoye (Russian: Семёновское) is a rural locality (a village) in Novlenskoye Rural Settlement, Vologodsky District, Vologda Oblast, Russia. The population was 4 as of 2002.

== Geography ==
The distance to Vologda is 64 km, to Novlenskoye is 4 km.
