= Semyonovskoye, Sobinsky District, Vladimir Oblast =

Semyonovskoye Семёновское
- Selo
- Location within Vladimir Oblast Location within Russia
- Coordinates: 56°07′N 40°11′E
- Country: Russia
- Region: Vladimir Oblast
- District: Sobinsky District
- Time zone: UTC+3:00

Semyonovskoye (Russian: Семёновское) is a rural locality (a selo) in Kolokshanskoye Rural Settlement, Sobinsky District, Vladimir Oblast, Russia. The population was 185 as of 2010. There are 4 streets.

== Geography ==
Semyonovskoye is located on the Sodyshka River, 26 km northeast of Sobinka (the district's administrative centre) by road. Vladimirovka is the nearest rural locality.
