= Leninsk, Perm Krai =

Leninsk Ленинск
- Selo
- Location within Perm Krai Location within Russia
- Coordinates: 58°43′N 54°41′E
- Country: Russia
- Region: Perm Krai
- District: Kudymkarsky District
- Time zone: UTC+5:00

Leninsk (Russian: Ленинск) is a rural locality (a selo) and the administrative center of Leninskoye Rural Settlement, Kudymkarsky District, Perm Krai, Russia. The population was 592 as of 2010. There are 11 streets.

== Geography ==
Leninsk is located 35 km south of Kudymkar (the district's administrative centre) by road. Yevdokimova is the nearest rural locality.
