= Semyonovskoye, Ivanovsky District, Ivanovo Oblast =

Semyonovskoye Семёновское
- Selo
- Location within Ivanovo Oblast Location within Russia
- Coordinates: 57°05′N 40°54′E
- Country: Russia
- Region: Ivanovo Oblast
- District: Ivanovsky District
- Time zone: UTC+3:00

Semyonovskoye (Russian: Семёновское) is a rural locality (a selo) in Ivanovsky District, Ivanovo Oblast, Russia. Population: 109 (2010 census);

== Geography ==
This rural locality is located 11 kilometres (6.8 mi) from Ivanovo (the district's administrative centre and capital of Ivanovo Oblast) and 248 kilometres (154 mi) from Moscow. Ivantsevo is the nearest rural locality.
