= Semyonovskoye, Kirzhachsky District, Vladimir Oblast =

Semyonovskoye Семёновское
- Selo
- Location within Vladimir Oblast Location within Russia
- Coordinates: 56°14′N 38°45′E
- Country: Russia
- Region: Vladimir Oblast
- District: Kirzhachsky District
- Time zone: UTC+3:00

Semyonovskoye (Russian: Семёновское) is a rural locality (a selo) in Gorkinskoye Rural Settlement, Kirzhachsky District, Vladimir Oblast, Russia. The population was 13 as of 2010. There are 2 streets.

== Geography ==
Semyonovskoye is located on the Sherna River, 16 km north of Kirzhach (the district's administrative centre) by road. Gorka is the nearest rural locality.
