= Lenina, Bolshezhirovsky selsovet, Fatezhsky District, Kursk Oblast =

Rural locality in Kursk Oblast, Russia

Lenina Ленина
- Khutor
- Interactive map of Lenina
- Location of Lenina Lenina (Kursk Oblast)
- Coordinates: 51°57′19″N 35°43′42″E
- Country: Russia
- Federal subject: Kursk Oblast
- Administrative district: Fatezhsky District
- SelsovietSelsoviet: Bolshezhirovsky

Population (2010 Census)
  - Total: 17
  - Estimate (2010): 17 (0%)

Municipal status
  - Municipal district: Fatezhsky Municipal District
  - Rural settlement: Bolshezhirovsky Selsoviet Rural Settlement
- Postal code: 307113
- Dialing code: +7 47144
- Website: мобольшежировский.рф

Lenina (Russian: Ленина) is a rural locality (a khutor) in Bolshezhirovsky Selsoviet Rural Settlement, Fatezhsky District, Kursk Oblast, Russia. Population: 17 (2010 census); 35 (2002 census);

== Geography ==
The khutor is located on the Gryaznaya Rudka Brook (a right tributary of the Ruda in the basin of the Svapa), 90.5 km from the Russia–Ukraine border, 39.5 km north-west of Kursk, 17 km south-west of the district center – the town Fatezh, 17 km from the selsoviet center – Bolshoye Zhirovo.

Climate

Lenina has a warm-summer humid continental climate (Dfb in the Köppen climate classification).

== Transport ==
Lenina is located 14 km from the federal route M-2 Crimea Highway as part of the European route E105, 16 km from the road of regional importance 38K-038 (Fatezh – Dmitriyev), 2.5 km from the road of intermunicipal significance 38H-221 (M2 "Crimea Highway" – Kromskaya), 29.5 km from the nearest railway halt 552 km (railway line Navlya – Lgov-Kiyevsky).

The rural locality is situated 44.5 km from Kursk Vostochny Airport, 156 km from Belgorod International Airport and 241 km from Voronezh Peter the Great Airport.
