= Semyonovskoye, Vichugsky District, Ivanovo Oblast =

Semyonovskoye Семеновское
- Selo
- Location within Ivanovo Oblast Location within Russia
- Coordinates: 57°11′N 42°12′E
- Country: Russia
- Region: Ivanovo Oblast
- District: Vichugsky District
- Time zone: UTC+3:00

Semyonovskoye (Russian: Семеновское) is a rural locality (a selo) in Vichugsky District, Ivanovo Oblast, Russia. Population: 71 (2010 census); 99 (2002 census);

== Geography ==
This rural locality is located 17 km from Vichuga (the district's administrative centre), 78 km from Ivanovo (capital of Ivanovo Oblast) and 319 km from Moscow. Korovino Nizhneye is the nearest rural locality.
