= Leninsk =

Leninsk may refer to several places:

- Leninsk, Russia, name of several inhabited localities in Russia
- Leninsk, former name of the town of Asaka, Uzbekistan
- Leninsk, name of Baikonur, Kazakhstan, in 1958–1995
- Leninsk-Kuznetsky (city), a city in Kemerovo Oblast, Russia
