= Leninsky, Tula Oblast =

Rural locality in Tula Oblast, Russia

Coordinates: 54°17′10″N 37°27′58″E

Leninsky (Russian: Ленинский) is a rural locality (a settlement) and the administrative center of Leninsky District, Tula Oblast, Russia. Population: 7,054 (2010 census); 10,120 (2002 census); 10,761 (1989 Soviet census).
