= Leninsky District, Tula Oblast =

Leninsky District Ленинский район (Russian)
- District
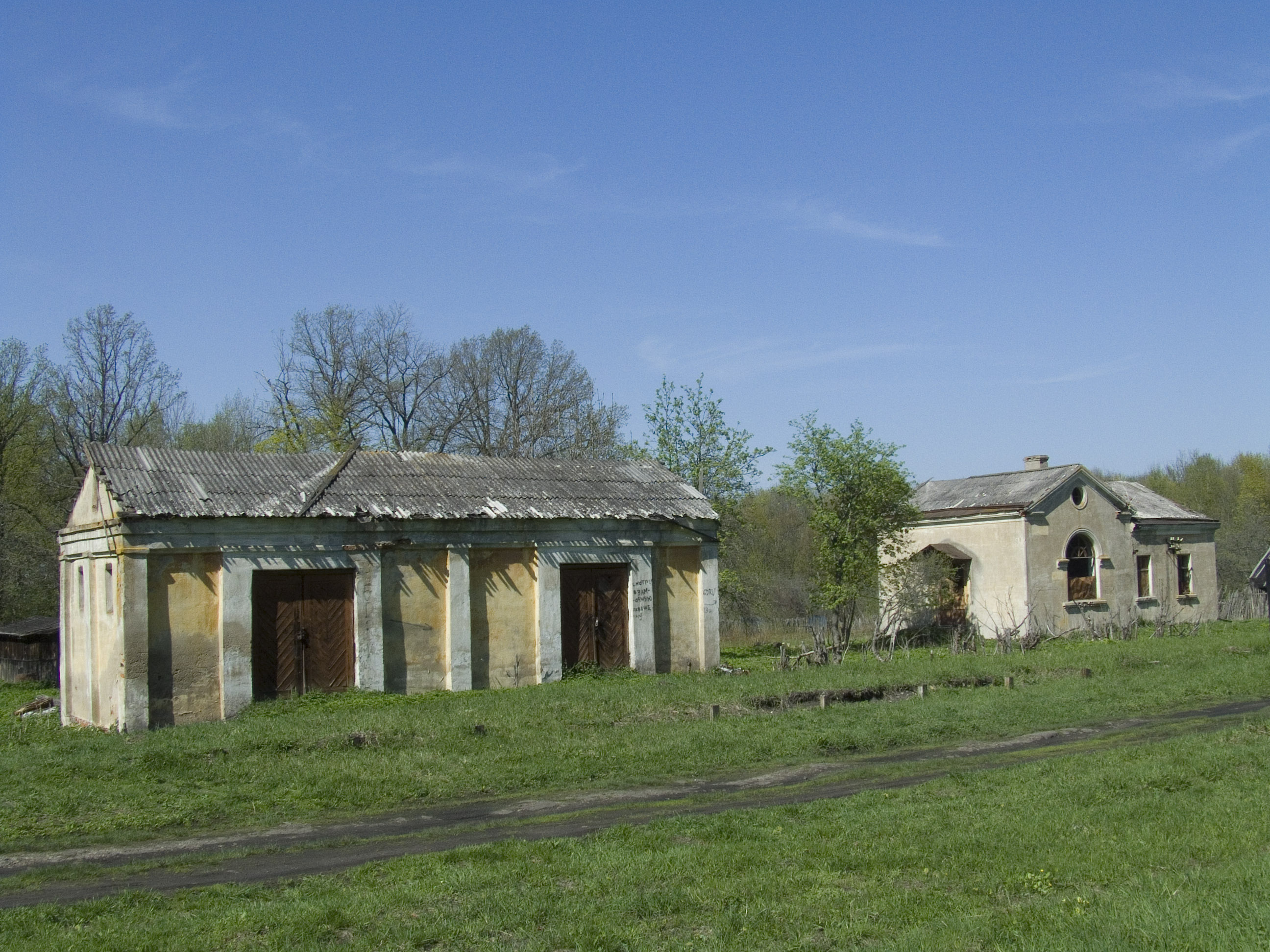
- A former railway station in the village of Rvy in Leninsky District

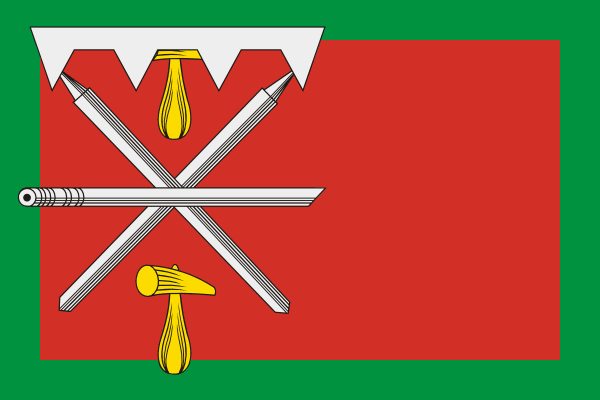
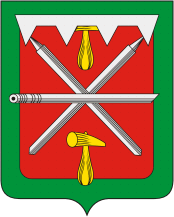
- Flag Coat of arms
- Location of Leninsky District in Tula Oblast
- Coordinates: 54°17′31″N 37°27′40″E
- Country: Russia
- Federal subject: Tula Oblast
- Established: 21 August 1939
- Administrative center: Leninsky

Area
  - Total: 1,351.21 km^{2} (521.71 sq mi)

Population (2010 Census)
  - Total: 63,355
  - Density: 46.888/km^{2} (121.44/sq mi)
  - Urban: 25.6%
  - Rural: 74.4%

Administrative structure
  - Administrative divisions: 17 Rural okrugs
  - Inhabited localities: 244 rural localities

Municipal structure
  - Municipally incorporated as: Tula Urban Okrug
- Website: https://archive.today/20130417223048/http://leninskiy.tulobl.ru/

Leninsky District (Russian: Ле́нинский райо́н) is an administrative district (raion), one of the twenty-three in Tula Oblast, Russia. It is located in the northern central part of the oblast. The area of the district is 1,351.21 square kilometers (521.71 sq mi). Its administrative center is the rural locality (a settlement) of Leninsky. Population: 63,355 (2010 Census); 64,412 (2002 census); 70,013 (1989 Soviet census). The population of the administrative center accounts for 11.1% of the district's total population.

== Administrative and municipal status ==
Within the framework of administrative divisions, Leninsky District is one of the twenty-three in the oblast. The rural locality (a settlement) of Leninsky serves as its administrative center.

As a municipal division, the territory of the administrative district and the territory of the Tula City Under Oblast Jurisdiction are incorporated together as Tula Urban Okrug.
