= Leninskoye, Kirov Oblast =

Leninskoye Ленинское
- Urban-type settlement
- Interactive map of Leninskoye
- Location of Leninskoye Leninskoye (Kirov Oblast)
- Coordinates: 58.3163°N 47.0876°E
- Country: Russia
- Federal subject: Kirov Oblast
- Administrative district: Shabalinsky District
- Founded: 1854

Population (2010 Census)
  - Total: 5,054
  - Estimate (2025): 3,899 (−22.9%)
- Time zone: UTC+3 (MSK)
- Postal code: 612020
- OKTMO ID: 33647151051

Leninskoye (Russian: Ленинское) is an urban locality (an urban-type settlement) in Shabalinsky District of Kirov Oblast, Russia. Population: 5,054 (2010 census); 5,490 (2002 census); 5,916 (1989 Soviet census).
