= Shabalinsky District =

Shabalinsky District Шабалинский район (Russian)
- District
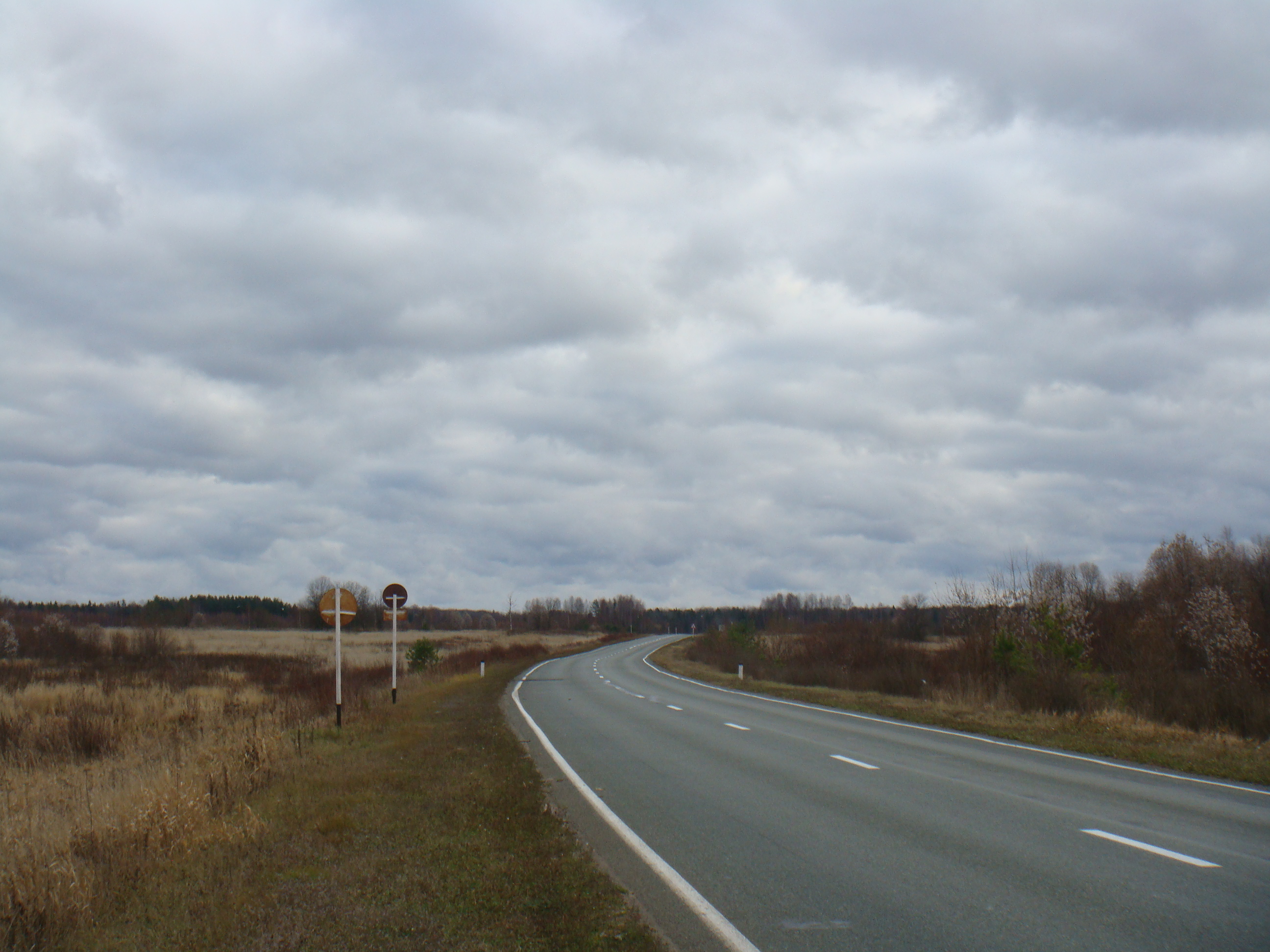
- November in Shabalinsky District

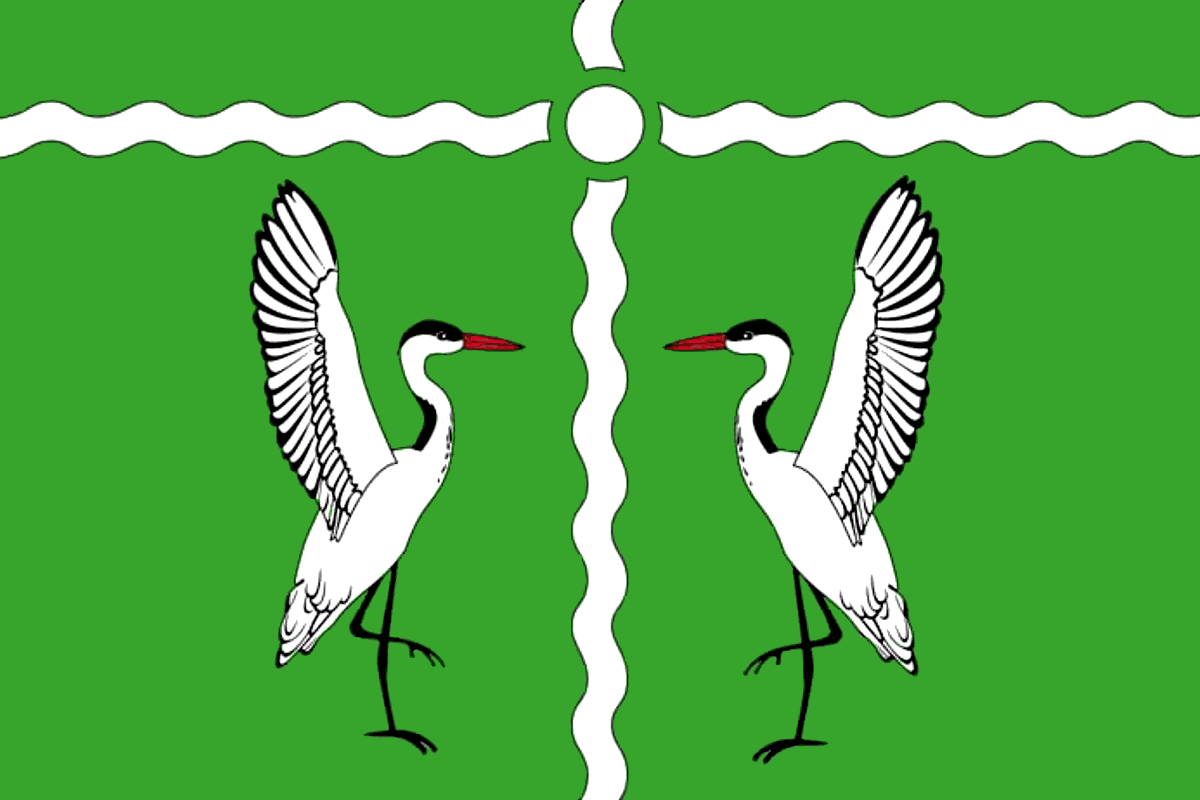
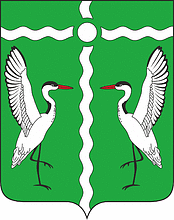
- Flag Coat of arms
- Location of Shabalinsky District in Kirov Oblast
- Coordinates: 58°18′33″N 47°05′07″E
- Country: Russia
- Federal subject: Kirov Oblast
- Established: 1929
- Administrative center: Leninskoye

Area
  - Total: 3,860 km^{2} (1,490 sq mi)

Population (2010 Census)
  - Total: 10,854
  - Density: 2.81/km^{2} (7.28/sq mi)
  - Urban: 46.6%
  - Rural: 53.4%

Administrative structure
  - Administrative divisions: 1 Urban-type settlements, 4 Rural okrugs
  - Inhabited localities: 1 urban-type settlements, 142 rural localities

Municipal structure
  - Municipally incorporated as: Shabalinsky Municipal District
  - Municipal divisions: 1 urban settlements, 4 rural settlements
- Time zone: UTC+3 (MSK)
- OKTMO ID: 33647000
- Website: https://adm-shabalino.ru/

Shabalinsky District (Russian: Шабалинский райо́н) is an administrative and municipal district (raion), one of the thirty-nine in Kirov Oblast, Russia. It is located in the west of the oblast. The area of the district is 3,860 square kilometers (1,490 sq mi). Its administrative center is the urban locality (an urban-type settlement) of Leninskoye. Population: 10,854 (2010 census); 14,013 (2002 Census); 17,489 (1989 Soviet census). The population of Leninskoye accounts for 46.6% of the district's total population.

== People ==
- Alexey Dobrovolsky (Dobroslav) (October 13, 1938 – May 19, 2013) - a member of the dissident movement of the USSR in the 1950s - 1960s and ideologist of Slavic neopaganism (Rodnoverie). Since the 1990s, he lived in the village of Vasenyovo.
