= Ushakovo =

Ushakovo (Russian: Ушаково) is the name of several rural localities in Russia.

== Amur Oblast ==
As of 2012, one rural locality in Amur Oblast bears this name:

- Ushakovo, Amur Oblast, a selo in Ushakovsky Rural Settlement of Shimanovsky District

== Republic of Bashkortostan ==
As of 2012, one rural locality in the Republic of Bashkortostan bears this name:

- Ushakovo, Republic of Bashkortostan, a village in Nikolayevsky Selsoviet of Ufimsky District

== Belgorod Oblast ==
As of 2012, one rural locality in Belgorod Oblast bears this name:

- Ushakovo, Belgorod Oblast, a selo in Korochansky District

== Ivanovo Oblast ==
As of 2012, two rural localities in Ivanovo Oblast bear this name:

- Ushakovo, Rodnikovsky District, Ivanovo Oblast, a village in Rodnikovsky District
- Ushakovo, Teykovsky District, Ivanovo Oblast, a village in Teykovsky District

== Kaliningrad Oblast ==
As of 2012, four rural localities in Kaliningrad Oblast bear this name:

- Ushakovo, Chernyakhovsky District, Kaliningrad Oblast, a settlement in Svobodnensky Rural Okrug of Chernyakhovsky District
- Ushakovo, Nizovsky Rural Okrug, Guryevsky District, Kaliningrad Oblast, a settlement in Nizovsky Rural Okrug of Guryevsky District
- Ushakovo, Novomoskovsky Rural Okrug, Guryevsky District, Kaliningrad Oblast, a settlement in Novomoskovsky Rural Okrug of Guryevsky District
- Ushakovo, Ozyorsky District, Kaliningrad Oblast, a settlement under the administrative jurisdiction of the Town of District Significance of Ozyorsk in Ozyorsky District

== Kaluga Oblast ==
As of 2012, one rural locality in Kaluga Oblast bears this name:

- Ushakovo, Kaluga Oblast, a village in Maloyaroslavetsky District

== Kemerovo Oblast ==
As of 2012, one rural locality in Kemerovo Oblast bears this name:

- Ushakovo, Kemerovo Oblast, a village in Kalinkinskaya Rural Territory of Promyshlennovsky District; 54°56′N 85°51′E

== Kirov Oblast ==
As of 2012, three rural localities in Kirov Oblast bear this name:

- Ushakovo, Kiknursky District, Kirov Oblast, a village in Vashtrangsky Rural Okrug of Kiknursky District; 57°22′N 47°6′E
- Ushakovo, Luzsky District, Kirov Oblast, a village under the administrative jurisdiction of Lalsk Urban-Type Settlement in Luzsky District; 60°38′N 47°50′E
- Ushakovo, Verkhnekamsky District, Kirov Oblast, a village in Loynsky Rural Okrug of Verkhnekamsky District; 59°56′N 52°28′E

== Kostroma Oblast ==
As of 2012, three rural localities in Kostroma Oblast bear this name:

- Ushakovo, Buysky District, Kostroma Oblast, a selo in Tsentralnoye Settlement of Buysky District; 58°42′N 41°54′E
- Ushakovo, Nerekhtsky District, Kostroma Oblast, a selo in Volzhskoye Settlement of Nerekhtsky District; 57°32′N 40°55′E
- Ushakovo, Oktyabrsky District, Kostroma Oblast, a village in Pokrovskoye Settlement of Oktyabrsky District; 58°57′N 47°2′E

== Kurgan Oblast ==
As of 2012, one rural locality in Kurgan Oblast bears this name:

- Ushakovo, Kurgan Oblast, a village in Peschansky Selsoviet of Shchuchansky District

== Kursk Oblast ==
As of 2012, two rural localities in Kursk Oblast bear this name:

- Ushakovo, Fatezhsky District, Kursk Oblast, a village in Bolshezhirovsky Selsoviet of Fatezhsky District
- Ushakovo, Kursky District, Kursk Oblast, a village in Shchetinsky Selsoviet of Kursky District

== Leningrad Oblast ==
As of 2012, one rural locality in Leningrad Oblast bears this name:

- Ushakovo, Leningrad Oblast, a village in Shugozerskoye Settlement Municipal Formation of Tikhvinsky District

== Mari El Republic ==
As of 2012, one rural locality in the Mari El Republic bears this name:

- Ushakovo, Mari El Republic, a village in Karakshinsky Rural Okrug of Orshansky District

== Moscow Oblast ==
As of 2012, one rural locality in Moscow Oblast bears this name:

- Ushakovo, Moscow Oblast, a village in Osheykinskoye Rural Settlement of Lotoshinsky District

== Nizhny Novgorod Oblast ==
As of 2012, three rural localities in Nizhny Novgorod Oblast bear this name:

- Ushakovo, Aleshkovsky Selsoviet, Bogorodsky District, Nizhny Novgorod Oblast, a village in Aleshkovsky Selsoviet of Bogorodsky District
- Ushakovo, Kamensky Selsoviet, Bogorodsky District, Nizhny Novgorod Oblast, a village in Kamensky Selsoviet of Bogorodsky District
- Ushakovo, Gaginsky District, Nizhny Novgorod Oblast, a selo in Ushakovsky Selsoviet of Gaginsky District

== Novgorod Oblast ==
As of 2012, two rural localities in Novgorod Oblast bear this name:

- Ushakovo, Borovichsky District, Novgorod Oblast, a village in Travkovskoye Settlement of Borovichsky District
- Ushakovo, Lyubytinsky District, Novgorod Oblast, a village under the administrative jurisdiction of the Settlement of Nebolchskoye in Lyubytinsky District

== Omsk Oblast ==
As of 2012, one rural locality in Omsk Oblast bears this name:

- Ushakovo, Omsk Oblast, a selo in Ushakovsky Rural Okrug of Muromtsevsky District

== Oryol Oblast ==
As of 2012, one rural locality in Oryol Oblast bears this name:

- Ushakovo, Oryol Oblast, a selo in Ushakovsky Selsoviet of Kolpnyansky District

== Pskov Oblast ==
As of 2012, one rural locality in Pskov Oblast bears this name:

- Ushakovo, Pskov Oblast, a village in Nevelsky District

== Ryazan Oblast ==
As of 2012, one rural locality in Ryazan Oblast bears this name:

- Ushakovo, Ryazan Oblast, a selo in Sobchakovsky Rural Okrug of Spassky District

== Smolensk Oblast ==
As of 2012, two rural localities in Smolensk Oblast bear this name:

- Ushakovo, Dorogobuzhsky District, Smolensk Oblast, a village in Ushakovskoye Rural Settlement of Dorogobuzhsky District
- Ushakovo, Yelninsky District, Smolensk Oblast, a village in Rozhdestvenskoye Rural Settlement of Yelninsky District

== Tula Oblast ==
As of 2012, three rural localities in Tula Oblast bear this name:

- Ushakovo, Uzlovsky District, Tula Oblast, a village in Lyutoricheskaya Rural Administration of Uzlovsky District
- Ushakovo, Yasnogorsky District, Tula Oblast, a village in Znamenskaya Rural Territory of Yasnogorsky District
- Ushakovo, Yefremovsky District, Tula Oblast, a selo in Shkilevsky Rural Okrug of Yefremovsky District

== Tver Oblast ==
As of 2012, five rural localities in Tver Oblast bear this name:

- Ushakovo, Bezhetsky District, Tver Oblast, a village in Shishkovskoye Rural Settlement of Bezhetsky District
- Ushakovo, Staritsky District, Tver Oblast, a village in Stepurinskoye Rural Settlement of Staritsky District
- Ushakovo, Torzhoksky District, Tver Oblast, a village in Budovskoye Rural Settlement of Torzhoksky District
- Ushakovo, Udomelsky District, Tver Oblast, a village in Brusovskoye Rural Settlement of Udomelsky District
- Ushakovo, Vesyegonsky District, Tver Oblast, a village in Proninskoye Rural Settlement of Vesyegonsky District

== Tyumen Oblast ==
As of 2012, one rural locality in Tyumen Oblast bears this name:

- Ushakovo, Tyumen Oblast, a selo in Ushakovsky Rural Okrug of Vagaysky District

== Vladimir Oblast ==
As of 2012, one rural locality in Vladimir Oblast bears this name:

- Ushakovo, Vladimir Oblast, a village in Sudogodsky District

== Vologda Oblast ==
As of 2012, seven rural localities in Vologda Oblast bear this name:

- Ushakovo, Chagodoshchensky District, Vologda Oblast, a village in Pervomaysky Selsoviet of Chagodoshchensky District
- Ushakovo, Gryazovetsky District, Vologda Oblast, a village in Anokhinsky Selsoviet of Gryazovetsky District
- Ushakovo, Kichmengsko-Gorodetsky District, Vologda Oblast, a village in Kichmengsky Selsoviet of Kichmengsko-Gorodetsky District
- Ushakovo, Mezhdurechensky District, Vologda Oblast, a village in Botanovsky Selsoviet of Mezhdurechensky District
- Ushakovo, Ust-Kubinsky District, Vologda Oblast, a village in Filisovsky Selsoviet of Ust-Kubinsky District
- Ushakovo, Ivanovsky Selsoviet, Vashkinsky District, Vologda Oblast, a village in Ivanovsky Selsoviet of Vashkinsky District
- Ushakovo, Piksimovsky Selsoviet, Vashkinsky District, Vologda Oblast, a village in Piksimovsky Selsoviet of Vashkinsky District

== Yaroslavl Oblast ==
As of 2012, nine rural localities in Yaroslavl Oblast bear this name:

- Ushakovo, Bolsheselsky District, Yaroslavl Oblast, a village in Bolsheselsky Rural Okrug of Bolsheselsky District
- Ushakovo, Nekouzsky District, Yaroslavl Oblast, a village in Stanilovsky Rural Okrug of Nekouzsky District
- Ushakovo, Pervomaysky District, Yaroslavl Oblast, a village in Semenovsky Rural Okrug of Pervomaysky District
- Ushakovo, Rostovsky District, Yaroslavl Oblast, a village in Novo-Nikolsky Rural Okrug of Rostovsky District
- Ushakovo, Rybinsky District, Yaroslavl Oblast, a village in Arefinsky Rural Okrug of Rybinsky District
- Ushakovo, Tutayevsky District, Yaroslavl Oblast, a village in Borisoglebsky Rural Okrug of Tutayevsky District
- Ushakovo, Uglichsky District, Yaroslavl Oblast, a village in Ninorovsky Rural Okrug of Uglichsky District
- Ushakovo, Lyutovsky Rural Okrug, Yaroslavsky District, Yaroslavl Oblast, a village in Lyutovsky Rural Okrug of Yaroslavsky District
- Ushakovo, Tochishchensky Rural Okrug, Yaroslavsky District, Yaroslavl Oblast, a selo in Tochishchensky Rural Okrug of Yaroslavsky District
