= Maloye Zhirovo =

Rural locality in Kursk Oblast, Russia

Maloye Zhirovo Малое Жирово
- Village
- Interactive map of Maloye Zhirovo
- Location of Maloye Zhirovo Maloye Zhirovo (Kursk Oblast)
- Coordinates: 51°58′09″N 36°01′48″E
- Country: Russia
- Federal subject: Kursk Oblast
- Administrative district: Fatezhsky District
- SelsovietSelsoviet: Bolshezhirovsky

Population (2010 Census)
  - Total: 32
  - Estimate (2010): 32 (0%)

Municipal status
  - Municipal district: Fatezhsky Municipal District
  - Rural settlement: Bolshezhirovsky Selsoviet Rural Settlement
- Time zone: UTC+3 (MSK)
- Postal code: 307116
- Dialing code: +7 47144
- OKTMO ID: 38644412136
- Website: мобольшежировский.рф

Maloye Zhirovo (Russian: Малое Жирово) is a rural locality (Russian: деревня, lit. 'village') in Bolshezhirovsky Selsoviet Rural Settlement, Fatezhsky District, Kursk Oblast, Russia. The population as of 2010 is 32.

== Geography ==
The village is located on the Bolshaya Kuritsa River (a right tributary of the Seym River), 102 km from the Russia–Ukraine border, 27 km north-west of Kursk, 18 km south-east of the district center – the town Fatezh, 3.5 km from the selsoviet center – Bolshoye Zhirovo.

=== Climate ===
Maloye Zhirovo has a warm-summer humid continental climate (Dfb in the Köppen climate classification).

== Transport ==
Maloye Zhirovo is located 2.5 km from the federal route M-2 Crimea Highway as part of the European route E105, 18 km from the road of regional importance 38K-018 (Kursk – Ponyri), 5.5 km from the road 38K-039 (Fatezh – 38K-018), 2.5 km from the road of intermunicipal significance 38Н-819 (Bolshoye Zhirovo – Skripeyevka – Kutasovka), 21.5 km from the nearest railway halt 517 km (railway line Oryol – Kursk).

The rural locality is situated 29 km from Kursk Vostochny Airport, 150 km from Belgorod International Airport and 221 km from Voronezh Peter the Great Airport.
