= Kukuyevka, Russia =

Kukuyevka (Russian: Кукуевка) is a common name shared by a number of rural localities in Russia.

== Belgorod Oblast ==
- Kukuyevka, a selo in Valuysky District

== Bryansk Oblast ==
- Kukuyevka, Bryansk Oblast, a settlement

== Kursk Oblast ==
- Kukuyevka, Kursky District, Kursk Oblast, a village
- Kukuyevka (village), Fatezhsky District, Kursk Oblast, a village
- Kukuyevka (khutor), Fatezhsky District, Kursk Oblast, a khutor
- Kukuyevka, Shchigrovsky District, Kursk Oblast, a village

== Oryol Oblast ==
- Kukuyevka, Glazynovsky District, Oryol Oblast, a village
- Kukuyevka, Khotynetsky District, Oryol Oblast, a village
- Kukuyevka, Soskovsky District, Oryol Oblast, a settlement

== Pskov Oblast ==
- Kukuyevka, Pskov Oblast, a village

== Smolensk Oblast ==
- Kukuyevka, Smolensk Oblast, a village

== Tula Oblast ==
- Kukuyevka, Chernsky District, Tula Oblast, a village
- Kukuyevka, Kurkinsky District, Tula Oblast, a village
- Kukuyevka, Shchyokinsky District, Tula Oblast, a village

== Sources ==
- Белгородская областная Дума. Закон №159 от 20 декабря 2004 г. «Об установлении границ муниципальных образований и наделении их статусом городского, сельского поселения, городского округа, муниципального района», в ред. Закона №244 от 4 декабря 2013 г. «О внесении изменения в статью 12 Закона Белгородской области "Об установлении границ муниципальных образований и наделении их статусом городского, сельского поселения, городского округа, муниципального района"». Вступил в силу по истечении 10 дней со дня официального опубликования. Опубликован: "Белгородские известия", №218–220, 24 декабря 2004 г. (Belgorod Oblast Duma. Law #159 of December 20, 2004 On Establishing the Borders of the Municipal Formations and on Granting Them a Status of Urban, Rural Settlement, Urban Okrug, Municipal District, as amended by the Law #244 of December 4, 2013 On Amending Article 12 of the Law of Belgorod Oblast "On Establishing the Borders of the Municipal Formations and on Granting Them a Status of Urban, Rural Settlement, Urban Okrug, Municipal District". Effective as of the day which is 10 days after the official publication.).
- Брянская областная Дума. Закон №69-З от 2 ноября 2012 г. «Об образовании городских административных округов, поселковых административных округов, сельских административных округов, установлении границ, наименований и административных центров административных округов в Брянской области». Вступил в силу 1 января 2013 г. Опубликован: Информационный бюллетень "Официальная Брянщина", №16, 6 ноября 2012 г.. (Bryansk Oblast Duma. Law #69-Z of November 2, 2002 On the Establishment of Urban Administrative Okrugs, Settlement Administrative Okrugs, Rural Administrative Okrugs, on Establishing Borders, Names, and Administrative Centers of the Administrative Okrugs of Bryansk Oblast. Effective as of January 1, 2013.).
- Брянская областная Дума. Закон №3-З от 9 марта 2005 г. «О наделении муниципальных образований статусом статусом городского округа, муниципального района, городского поселения, сельского поселения и установлении границ муниципальных образований в Брянской области», в ред. Закона №75-З от 28 сентября 2015 г. «Об изменении статуса населённого пункта посёлок Красный Ятвиж Клетнянского района Брянской области». Вступил в силу через 10 дней после официального опубликования. Опубликован: "Брянская неделя", №13, 8 апреля 2005 г. (Bryansk Oblast Duma. Law #3-Z of March 9, 2005 On Granting the Municipal Formations the Status of Urban Okrug, Municipal District, Urban Settlement, Rural Settlement and on Establishing the Borders of the Municipal Formations of Bryansk Oblast, as amended by the Law #75-Z of September 28, 2015 On Changing the Status of the Inhabited Locality the Settlement of Krasny Yatvizh in Kletnyansky District of Bryansk Oblast. Effective as of the day which is 10 days after the official publication.).
- Губернатор Курской области. Постановление №489 от 6 ноября 2008 г. «Об утверждении реестра административно-территориальных единиц населённых пунктов Курской области», в ред. Постановления №26-пг от 29 января 2013 г. «О внесении изменений и дополнений в Постановление Губернатора Курской области от 06.11.2008 №489 "Об утверждении реестра административно-территориальных единиц населённых пунктов Курской области"». Вступил в силу 6 ноября 2008 г. (Governor of Kursk Oblast. Resolution #489 of November 6, 2008 On the Adoption of the Registry of the Administrative-Territorial Units and Inhabited Localities of Kursk Oblast, as amended by the Resolution #26-pg of January 29, 2013 On Amending and Supplementing Resolution #489 of the Governor of Kursk Oblast of November 6, 2008 "On the Adoption of the Registry of the Administrative-Territorial Units and Inhabited Localities of Kursk Oblast". Effective as of November 6, 2008.).
- Курская областная Дума. Закон №48-ЗКО от 21 октября 2004 г. «О муниципальных образованиях Курской области», в ред. Закона №65-ЗКО от 23 августа 2011 г. «О внесении изменений и дополнений в Закон Курской области "О границах муниципальных образований Курской области", Закон Курской области "О муниципальных образованиях Курской области"». Вступил в силу со дня официального опубликования. Опубликован: "Курская правда", №214, 30 октября 2004 г. (Kursk Oblast Duma. Law #48-ZKO of October 21, 2004 On the Municipal Formations of Kursk Oblast, as amended by the Law #65-ZKO of August 23, 2011 On Amending and Supplementing the Law of Kursk Oblast "On the Borders of the Municipal Formations of Kursk Oblast", Law of Kursk Oblast "On the Municipal Formations of Kursk Oblast". Effective as of the day of the official publication.).
- Орловский областной Совет народных депутатов. Закон №522-ОЗ от 6 июля 2005 г. «Об административно-территориальном устройстве Орловской области», в ред. Закона №1187-ОЗ от 1 апреля 2011 г «О внесении изменений в законодательные акты Орловской области». Вступил в силу с момента официального опубликования. Опубликован: "Орловская правда", №116, 13 июля 2005 г. (Oryol Oblast Council of People's Deputies. Law #522-OZ of July 6, 2005 On the Administrative-Territorial Structure of Oryol Oblast, as amended by the Law #1187-OZ of April 1, 2011 On Amending the Legislative Acts of Oryol Oblast. Effective as of the moment of the official publication.).
- Псковское областное Собрание депутатов. Закон №420-оз от 28 февраля 2005 г. «Об установлении границ и статусе вновь образуемых муниципальных образований на территории Псковской области», в ред. Закона №1542-ОЗ от 5 июня 2015 г. «О внесении изменений в Закон Псковской области "Об установлении границ и статусе вновь образуемых муниципальных образований на территории Псковской области"». Вступил в силу со дня официального опубликования. Опубликован: "Псковская правда", №41–43, №44–46, №49–51, 4 марта 2005 г., 5 марта 2005 г., 11 марта 2005 г. (Pskov Oblast Council of Deputies. Law #420-oz of February 28, 2005 On Establishing the Borders and the Status of the Newly Formed Municipal Formations on the Territory of Pskov Oblast, as amended by the Law #1542-OZ of June 5, 2015 On Amending the Law of Pskov Oblast "On Establishing the Borders and the Status of the Newly Formed Municipal Formations on the Territory of Pskov Oblast". Effective as of the official publication date.).
- Псковское областное Собрание депутатов. Закон №420-оз от 28 февраля 2005 г. «Об установлении границ и статусе вновь образуемых муниципальных образований на территории Псковской области», в ред. Закона №1542-ОЗ от 5 июня 2015 г. «О внесении изменений в Закон Псковской области "Об установлении границ и статусе вновь образуемых муниципальных образований на территории Псковской области"». Вступил в силу со дня официального опубликования. Опубликован: "Псковская правда", №41–43, №44–46, №49–51, 4 марта 2005 г., 5 марта 2005 г., 11 марта 2005 г. (Pskov Oblast Council of Deputies. Law #420-oz of February 28, 2005 On Establishing the Borders and the Status of the Newly Formed Municipal Formations on the Territory of Pskov Oblast, as amended by the Law #1542-OZ of June 5, 2015 On Amending the Law of Pskov Oblast "On Establishing the Borders and the Status of the Newly Formed Municipal Formations on the Territory of Pskov Oblast". Effective as of the official publication date.).
- Администрация Смоленской области. Постановление №261 от 30 апреля 2008 г. «Об утверждении реестра административно-территориальных единиц и территориальных единиц Смоленской области», в ред. Постановления №464 от 27 июня 2014 г. «О внесении изменений в реестр административно-территориальных единиц и территориальных единиц Смоленской области». Опубликован: База данных "Консультант-плюс". (Administration of Smolensk Oblast. Resolution #261 of April 30, 2008 On the Adoption of the Registry of the Administrative-Territorial Units and Territorial Units of Smolensk Oblast, as amended by the Resolution #464 of June 27, 2014 On Amending the Registry of the Administrative-Territorial Units and Territorial Units of Smolensk Oblast. ).
