= Biryukovka, Fatezhsky District, Kursk Oblast =

Rural locality in Kursk Oblast, Russia

Biryukovka Бирюковка
- Village
- Interactive map of Biryukovka
- Location of Biryukovka Biryukovka (Kursk Oblast)
- Coordinates: 51°57′45″N 35°59′50″E
- Country: Russia
- Federal subject: Kursk Oblast
- Administrative district: Fatezhsky District
- SelsovietSelsoviet: Bolshezhirovsky

Population (2010 Census)
  - Total: 37
  - Estimate (2010): 37 (0%)

Municipal status
  - Municipal district: Fatezhsky Municipal District
  - Rural settlement: Bolshezhirovsky Selsoviet Rural Settlement
- Time zone: UTC+3 (MSK)
- Postal code: 307116
- Dialing code: +7 47144
- OKTMO ID: 38644412111
- Website: мобольшежировский.рф

Biryukovka (Russian: Бирюковка) is a rural locality (Russian: деревня, lit. 'village') in Bolshezhirovsky Selsoviet Rural Settlement, Fatezhsky District, Kursk Oblast, Russia. Population: 37 (2010 census); 22 (2002 census);

== Geography ==
The village is located in the Bolshaya Kuritsa River basin (a right tributary of the Seym River), 101 km from the Russia–Ukraine border, 29 km north-west of Kursk, 17 km south-east of the district center – the town Fatezh, 2 km from the selsoviet center – Bolshoye Zhirovo.

Climate

Biryukovka has a warm-summer humid continental climate (Dfb in the Köppen climate classification).

== Transport ==
Biryukovka is located 1.5 km from the federal route M-2 Crimea Highway as part of the European route E105, 20.5 km from the road of regional importance 38K-018 (Kursk – Ponyri), 6.5 km from the road 38K-039 (Fatezh – 38K-018), 0.5 km from the road of intermunicipal significance 38Н-819 (Bolshoye Zhirovo – Skripeyevka – Kutasovka), 23 km from the nearest railway halt Bukreyevka (railway line Oryol – Kursk).

The rural locality is situated 30 km from Kursk Vostochny Airport, 151 km from Belgorod International Airport and 223 km from Voronezh Peter the Great Airport.
