= Setnoye, Kursk Oblast =

Rural locality in Kursk Oblast, Russia

Setnoye Сетное
- Village
- Interactive map of Setnoye
- Location of Setnoye Setnoye (Kursk Oblast)
- Coordinates: 51°58′39″N 35°53′16″E
- Country: Russia
- Federal subject: Kursk Oblast
- Administrative district: Fatezhsky District
- SelsovietSelsoviet: Bolshezhirovsky

Population (2010 Census)
  - Total: 33
  - Estimate (2010): 33 (0%)

Municipal status
  - Municipal district: Fatezhsky Municipal District
  - Rural settlement: Bolshezhirovsky Selsoviet Rural Settlement
- Time zone: UTC+3 (MSK)
- Postal code: 307116
- Dialing code: +7 47144
- OKTMO ID: 38644412146
- Website: мобольшежировский.рф

Setnoye (Russian: Сетное) is a rural locality (Russian: деревня, lit. 'village') in Bolshezhirovsky Selsoviet Rural Settlement, Fatezhsky District, Kursk Oblast, Russia. The population as of 2010 is 33.

== Geography ==
The village is located on the Verkhny Khoteml Brook (a link tributary of the Usozha in the basin of the Svapa), 98.5 km from the Russia–Ukraine border, 33 km north-west of Kursk, 12 km south of the district center – the town Fatezh, 6 km from the selsoviet center – Bolshoye Zhirovo.

=== Climate ===
Setnoye has a warm-summer humid continental climate (Dfb in the Köppen climate classification).

== Transport ==
Setnoye is located 3.5 km from the federal route M-2 Crimea Highway as part of the European route E105, 28 km from the road of regional importance 38K-018 (Kursk – Ponyri), 6.5 km from the road 38K-039 (Fatezh – 38K-018), 2 km from the road of intermunicipal significance 38H-221 (M2 "Crimea Highway" – Kromskaya), 30 km from the nearest railway halt Bukreyevka (railway line Oryol – Kursk).

The rural locality is situated 37 km from Kursk Vostochny Airport, 154 km from Belgorod International Airport and 230 km from Voronezh Peter the Great Airport.
