= Tomilin Kolodez =

Rural locality in Kursk Oblast, Russia

Tomilin Kolodez Томилин Колодезь
- Village
- Interactive map of Tomilin Kolodez
- Location of Tomilin Kolodez Tomilin Kolodez (Kursk Oblast)
- Coordinates: 51°58′14″N 35°54′12″E
- Country: Russia
- Federal subject: Kursk Oblast
- Administrative district: Fatezhsky District
- SelsovietSelsoviet: Bolshezhirovsky

Population (2010 Census)
  - Total: 57
  - Estimate (2010): 57 (0%)

Municipal status
  - Municipal district: Fatezhsky Municipal District
  - Rural settlement: Bolshezhirovsky Selsoviet Rural Settlement
- Time zone: UTC+3 (MSK)
- Postal code: 307116
- Dialing code: +7 47144
- OKTMO ID: 38644412156
- Website: мобольшежировский.рф

Tomilin Kolodez (Russian: Томилин Колодезь) is a rural locality (Russian: деревня, lit. 'village') in Bolshezhirovsky Selsoviet Rural Settlement, Fatezhsky District, Kursk Oblast, Russia. Population: 57 (2010 census); 90 (2002 census);

== Geography ==
The village is located 98 km from the Russia–Ukraine border, 31.5 km north-west of Kursk, 13 km south-east of the district center – the town Fatezh, 4.5 km from the selsoviet center – Bolshoye Zhirovo.

Climate

Tomilin Kolodez has a warm-summer humid continental climate (Dfb in the Köppen climate classification).

== Transport ==
Tomilin Kolodez is located 3 km from the federal route M-2 Crimea Highway as part of the European route E105, 27 km from the road of regional importance 38K-018 (Kursk – Ponyri), 6.5 km from the road 38K-039 (Fatezh – 38K-018), 1 km from the road of intermunicipal significance 38H-221 (M2 "Crimea Highway" – Kromskaya), 29 km from the nearest railway halt Bukreyevka (railway line Oryol – Kursk).

The rural locality is situated 35 km from Kursk Vostochny Airport, 154 km from Belgorod International Airport and 229 km from Voronezh Peter the Great Airport.
