= Novoye Sdobnikovo =

Rural locality in Kursk Oblast, Russia

Novoye Sdobnikovo Новое Сдобниково
- Selo
- Interactive map of Novoye Sdobnikovo
- Location of Novoye Sdobnikovo Novoye Sdobnikovo (Kursk Oblast)
- Coordinates: 51°53′39″N 35°45′15″E
- Country: Russia
- Federal subject: Kursk Oblast
- Administrative district: Fatezhsky District
- SelsovietSelsoviet: Bolshezhirovsky

Population (2010 Census)
  - Total: 31
  - Estimate (2010): 31 (0%)

Municipal status
  - Municipal district: Fatezhsky Municipal District
  - Rural settlement: Bolshezhirovsky Selsoviet Rural Settlement
- Time zone: UTC+3 (MSK)
- Postal code: 307113
- Dialing code: +7 47144
- OKTMO ID: 38644412221
- Website: мобольшежировский.рф

Novoye Sdobnikovo (Russian: Новое Сдобниково) is a rural locality (Russian: село, lit. 'village') in Bolshezhirovsky Selsoviet Rural Settlement, Fatezhsky District, Kursk Oblast, Russia. The population as of 2010 is 31.

== Geography ==
The village is located on the Gryaznaya Rudka Brook (a right tributary of the Ruda in the basin of the Svapa), 85.5 km from the Russia–Ukraine border, 34.5 km north-west of Kursk, 22.5 km south-west of the district center – the town Fatezh, 17 km from the selsoviet center – Bolshoye Zhirovo.

=== Climate ===
Novoye Sdobnikovo has a warm-summer humid continental climate (Dfb in the Köppen climate classification).

== Transport ==
Novoye Sdobnikovo is located 16.5 km from the federal route M-2 Crimea Highway as part of the European route E105, 25 km from the road of regional importance 38K-017 (Kursk – Lgov – Rylsk – border with Ukraine) as part of the European route E38, 2.5 km from the road of intermunicipal significance 38H-221 (M2 "Crimea Highway" – Kromskaya), 27 km from the nearest railway halt 433 km (railway line Lgov I — Kursk).

The rural locality is situated 40 km from Kursk Vostochny Airport, 149 km from Belgorod International Airport and 239 km from Voronezh Peter the Great Airport.
