= Bartenevsky =

Rural locality in Kursk Oblast, Russia

Bartenevsky Бартеневский
- Settlement
- Interactive map of Bartenevsky
- Location of Bartenevsky Bartenevsky (Kursk Oblast)
- Coordinates: 51°55′50″N 35°53′53″E
- Country: Russia
- Federal subject: Kursk Oblast
- Administrative district: Fatezhsky District
- SelsovietSelsoviet: Bolshezhirovsky

Population (2010 Census)
  - Total: 23
  - Estimate (2010): 23 (0%)

Municipal status
  - Municipal district: Fatezhsky Municipal District
  - Rural settlement: Bolshezhirovsky Selsoviet Rural Settlement
- Time zone: UTC+3 (MSK)
- Postal code: 307114
- Dialing code: +7 47144
- OKTMO ID: 38644412276
- Website: мобольшежировский.рф

Bartenevsky (Russian: Бартеневский) is a rural locality (a settlement) in Bolshezhirovsky Selsoviet Rural Settlement, Fatezhsky District, Kursk Oblast, Russia. Population: 23 (2010 census); 89 (2002 census);

== Geography ==
The settlement is located on the Malaya Kuritsa River (a right tributary of the Bolshaya Kuritsa River in the Seym River basin), 94 km from the Russia–Ukraine border, 29 km north-west of Kursk, 17 km south of the district center – the town Fatezh, 6 km from the selsoviet center – Bolshoye Zhirovo.

Climate

Bartenevsky has a warm-summer humid continental climate (Dfb in the Köppen climate classification).

== Transport ==
Bartenevsky is located 6 km from the federal route M-2 Crimea Highway as part of the European route E105, 27.5 km from the road of regional importance 38K-018 (Kursk – Ponyri), 11 km from the road 38K-039 (Fatezh – 38K-018), 2 km from the road of intermunicipal significance 38H-221 (M2 "Crimea Highway" – Kromskaya), 27 km from the nearest railway halt Bukreyevka (railway line Oryol – Kursk).

The rural locality is situated 33 km from Kursk Vostochny Airport, 149 km from Belgorod International Airport and 229 km from Voronezh Peter the Great Airport.
