= Bogdanovka, Fatezhsky District, Kursk Oblast =

Rural locality in Kursk Oblast, Russia

Bogdanovka Богдановка
- Village
- Interactive map of Bogdanovka
- Location of Bogdanovka Bogdanovka (Kursk Oblast)
- Coordinates: 51°56′16″N 35°47′30″E
- Country: Russia
- Federal subject: Kursk Oblast
- Administrative district: Fatezhsky District
- SelsovietSelsoviet: Bolshezhirovsky

Population (2010 Census)
  - Total: 21
  - Estimate (2010): 21 (0%)

Municipal status
  - Municipal district: Fatezhsky Municipal District
  - Rural settlement: Bolshezhirovsky Selsoviet Rural Settlement
- Time zone: UTC+3 (MSK)
- Postal code: 307114
- Dialing code: +7 47144
- OKTMO ID: 38644412281
- Website: мобольшежировский.рф

Bogdanovka (Russian: Богдановка) is a rural locality (Russian: деревня, lit. 'village') in Bolshezhirovsky Selsoviet Rural Settlement, Fatezhsky District, Kursk Oblast, Russia. Population: 21 (2010 census); 33 (2002 census);

== Geography ==
The village is located on the Nikovets Brook (a right tributary of the Ruda in the basin of the Svapa), 91 km from the Russia–Ukraine border, 35.5 km north-west of Kursk, 17 km south-west of the district center – the town Fatezh, 12.5 km from the selsoviet center – Bolshoye Zhirovo.

Climate

Bogdanovka has a warm-summer humid continental climate (Dfb in the Köppen climate classification).

== Transport ==
Bogdanovka is located 11 km from the federal route M-2 Crimea Highway as part of the European route E105, 34.5 km from the road of regional importance 38K-018 (Kursk – Ponyri), 14 km from the road 38K-039 (Fatezh – 38K-018), on the road of intermunicipal significance 38H-221 (M2 "Crimea Highway" – Kromskaya), 32 km from the nearest railway halt 433 km (railway line Lgov I — Kursk).

The rural locality is situated 39.5 km from Kursk Vostochny Airport, 152 km from Belgorod International Airport and 237 km from Voronezh Peter the Great Airport.
