= Meleshinka =

Rural locality in Kursk Oblast, Russia

Meleshinka Мелешинка
- Khutor
- Interactive map of Meleshinka
- Location of Meleshinka Meleshinka (Kursk Oblast)
- Coordinates: 51°54′49″N 35°45′02″E
- Country: Russia
- Federal subject: Kursk Oblast
- Administrative district: Fatezhsky District
- SelsovietSelsoviet: Bolshezhirovsky

Population (2010 Census)
  - Total: 47
  - Estimate (2010): 47 (0%)

Municipal status
  - Municipal district: Fatezhsky Municipal District
  - Rural settlement: Bolshezhirovsky Selsoviet Rural Settlement
- Time zone: UTC+3 (MSK)
- Postal code: 307113
- Dialing code: +7 47144
- OKTMO ID: 38644412171
- Website: мобольшежировский.рф

Meleshinka (Russian: Мелешинка) is a rural locality (a khutor) in Bolshezhirovsky Selsoviet Rural Settlement, Fatezhsky District, Kursk Oblast, Russia. The population as of 2010 is 47.

== Geography ==
The khutor is located on the Gryaznaya Rudka Brook (a right tributary of the Ruda in the basin of the Svapa), 87.5 km from the Russia–Ukraine border, 36 km north-west of Kursk, 20.5 km south-west of the district center – the town Fatezh, 16 km from the selsoviet center – Bolshoye Zhirovo.

Climate

Meleshinka has a warm-summer humid continental climate (Dfb in the Köppen climate classification).

== Transport ==
Meleshinka is located 15 km from the federal route M-2 Crimea Highway as part of the European route E105, 27.5 km from the road of regional importance 38K-017 (Kursk – Lgov – Rylsk – border with Ukraine) as part of the European route E38, 0.5 km from the road of intermunicipal significance 38H-221 (M2 "Crimea Highway" – Kromskaya), 29 km from the nearest railway halt 433 km (railway line Lgov I — Kursk).

The rural locality is situated 41 km from Kursk Vostochny Airport, 151 km from Belgorod International Airport and 240 km from Voronezh Peter the Great Airport.
