= Kolychevo, Kursk Oblast =

Rural locality in Kursk Oblast, Russia

Kolychevo Колычево
- Village
- Interactive map of Kolychevo
- Location of Kolychevo Kolychevo (Kursk Oblast)
- Coordinates: 51°56′56″N 35°49′46″E
- Country: Russia
- Federal subject: Kursk Oblast
- Administrative district: Fatezhsky District
- SelsovietSelsoviet: Bolshezhirovsky

Population (2010 Census)
  - Total: 7
  - Estimate (2010): 7 (0%)

Municipal status
  - Municipal district: Fatezhsky Municipal District
  - Rural settlement: Bolshezhirovsky Selsoviet Rural Settlement
- Time zone: UTC+3 (MSK)
- Postal code: 307114
- Dialing code: +7 47144
- OKTMO ID: 38644412336
- Website: мобольшежировский.рф

Kolychevo (Russian: Колычево) is a rural locality (Russian: деревня, lit. 'village') in Bolshezhirovsky Selsoviet Rural Settlement, Fatezhsky District, Kursk Oblast, Russia. Population: 7 (2010 census); 11 (2002 census);

== Geography ==
The village is located in the Nikovets River basin (a right tributary of the Ruda in the basin of the Svapa), 93 km from the Russia–Ukraine border, 34 km north-west of Kursk, 15.5 km south-west of the district center – the town Fatezh, 10 km from the selsoviet center – Bolshoye Zhirovo.

Climate

Kolychevo has a warm-summer humid continental climate (Dfb in the Köppen climate classification).

== Transport ==
Kolychevo is located 8.5 km from the federal route M-2 Crimea Highway as part of the European route E105, 16.5 km from the road of regional importance 38K-038 (Fatezh – Dmitriyev), 0.6 km from the road of intermunicipal significance 38H-221 (M2 "Crimea Highway" – Kromskaya), 33.5 km from the nearest railway halt 433 km (railway line Lgov I — Kursk).

The rural locality is situated 37.5 km from Kursk Vostochny Airport, 153 km from Belgorod International Airport and 235 km from Voronezh Peter the Great Airport.
