= Kukuyevka (village), Fatezhsky District, Kursk Oblast =

Rural locality in Kursk Oblast, Russia

Kukuyevka Кукуевка
- Village
- Interactive map of Kukuyevka
- Location of Kukuyevka Kukuyevka (Kursk Oblast)
- Coordinates: 51°57′48″N 35°59′26″E
- Country: Russia
- Federal subject: Kursk Oblast
- Administrative district: Fatezhsky District
- SelsovietSelsoviet: Bolshezhirovsky

Population (2010 Census)
  - Total: 11
  - Estimate (2010): 11 (0%)

Municipal status
  - Municipal district: Fatezhsky Municipal District
  - Rural settlement: Bolshezhirovsky Selsoviet Rural Settlement
- Time zone: UTC+3 (MSK)
- Postal code: 307116
- Dialing code: +7 47144
- OKTMO ID: 38644412121
- Website: мобольшежировский.рф

Kukuyevka (Russian: Кукуевка) is a rural locality (Russian: деревня, lit. 'village') in Bolshezhirovsky Selsoviet Rural Settlement, Fatezhsky District, Kursk Oblast, Russia. Population: 11 (2010 census); 6 (2002 census);

== Geography ==
The village is located 101 km from the Russia–Ukraine border, 28.5 km north-west of Kursk, 16.5 km south-east of the district center – the town Fatezh, 1.5 km from the selsoviet center – Bolshoye Zhirovo.

Climate

Kukuyevka has a warm-summer humid continental climate (Dfb in the Köppen climate classification).

== Transport ==
Kukuyevka is located 1.5 km from the federal route M-2 Crimea Highway as part of the European route E105, 21 km from the road of regional importance 38K-018 (Kursk – Ponyri), 6.5 km from the road 38K-039 (Fatezh – 38K-018), 0.5 km from the road of intermunicipal significance 38Н-819 (Bolshoye Zhirovo – Skripeyevka – Kutasovka), 23 km from the nearest railway halt Bukreyevka (railway line Oryol – Kursk).

The rural locality is situated 30.5 km from Kursk Vostochny Airport, 151 km from Belgorod International Airport and 223 km from Voronezh Peter the Great Airport.
