= Khlynino, Fatezhsky District, Kursk Oblast =

Rural locality in Kursk Oblast, Russia

Khlynino Хлынино
- Village
- Interactive map of Khlynino
- Location of Khlynino Khlynino (Kursk Oblast)
- Coordinates: 51°55′32″N 35°44′21″E
- Country: Russia
- Federal subject: Kursk Oblast
- Administrative district: Fatezhsky District
- SelsovietSelsoviet: Bolshezhirovsky

Population (2010 Census)
  - Total: 45
  - Estimate (2010): 45 (0%)

Municipal status
  - Municipal district: Fatezhsky Municipal District
  - Rural settlement: Bolshezhirovsky Selsoviet Rural Settlement
- Time zone: UTC+3 (MSK)
- Postal code: 307113
- Dialing code: +7 47144
- OKTMO ID: 38644412236
- Website: мобольшежировский.рф

Khlynino (Russian: Хлынино) is a rural locality (Russian: деревня, lit. 'village') in Bolshezhirovsky Selsoviet Rural Settlement, Fatezhsky District, Kursk Oblast, Russia. Population: 45 (2010 census); 45 (2002 census);

== Geography ==
The village is located on the Gryaznaya Rudka Brook (a right tributary of the Ruda in the basin of the Svapa), 88 km from the Russia–Ukraine border, 37.5 km north-west of Kursk, 19.5 km south-west of the district center – the town Fatezh, 16 km from the selsoviet center – Bolshoye Zhirovo.

Climate

Khlynino has a warm-summer humid continental climate (Dfb in the Köppen climate classification).

== Transport ==
Khlynino is located 15 km from the federal route M-2 Crimea Highway as part of the European route E105, 29 km from the road of regional importance 38K-017 (Kursk – Lgov – Rylsk – border with Ukraine) as part of the European route E38, on the road of intermunicipal significance 38H-221 (M2 "Crimea Highway" – Kromskaya), 30.5 km from the nearest railway halt 433 km (railway line Lgov I — Kursk).

The rural locality is situated 42 km from Kursk Vostochny Airport, 153 km from Belgorod International Airport and 241 km from Voronezh Peter the Great Airport.
