= Marmyzhi, Fatezhsky District, Kursk Oblast =

Rural locality in Kursk Oblast, Russia

Marmyzhi Мармыжи
- Village
- Location of Marmyzhi
- Location of Marmyzhi Marmyzhi (Kursk Oblast)
- Coordinates: 51°53′51″N 35°45′32″E
- Country: Russia
- Federal subject: Kursk Oblast
- Administrative district: Fatezhsky District
- Selsoviet: Bolshezhirovsky

Population (2010 Census)
  - Total: 24

Municipal status
  - Municipal district: Fatezhsky Municipal District
  - Rural settlement: Bolshezhirovsky Selsoviet Rural Settlement
- Time zone: UTC+3 (MSK)
- Postal code(s): 307113
- Dialing code(s): +7 47144
- OKTMO ID: 38644412216
- Website: мобольшежировский.рф

Marmyzhi (Russian: Мармыжи) is a rural locality (Russian: деревня, lit. 'village') in Bolshezhirovsky Selsoviet Rural Settlement, Fatezhsky District, Kursk Oblast, Russia. The population as of 2010 is 24.

== Geography ==
The village is located on the Gryaznaya Rudka Brook (a right tributary of the Ruda in the basin of the Svapa), 86 km from the Russia–Ukraine border, 35 km north-west of Kursk, 22 km south-west of the district center – the town Fatezh, 16 km from the selsoviet center – Bolshoye Zhirovo.

=== Climate ===
Marmyzhi has a warm-summer humid continental climate (Dfb in the Köppen climate classification).

== Transport ==
Marmyzhi is located 16 km from the federal route M-2 Crimea Highway as part of the European route E105, 25.5 km from the road of regional importance 38K-017 (Kursk – Lgov – Rylsk – border with Ukraine) as part of the European route E38, 2.5 km from the road of intermunicipal significance 38H-221 (M2 "Crimea Highway" – Kromskaya), 27 km from the nearest railway halt 433 km (railway line Lgov I — Kursk).

The rural locality is situated 39.5 km from Kursk Vostochny Airport, 149 km from Belgorod International Airport and 239 km from Voronezh Peter the Great Airport.
