= Kochetok, Kursk Oblast, OKTMO 38644412116 =

Rural locality in Kursk Oblast, Russia

Kochetok Кочеток
- Khutor
- Interactive map of Kochetok
- Location of Kochetok Kochetok (Kursk Oblast)
- Coordinates: 52°00′48″N 36°02′24″E
- Country: Russia
- Federal subject: Kursk Oblast
- Administrative district: Fatezhsky District
- SelsovietSelsoviet: Bolshezhirovsky

Population (2010 Census)
  - Total: 22
  - Estimate (2010): 22 (0%)

Municipal status
  - Municipal district: Fatezhsky Municipal District
  - Rural settlement: Bolshezhirovsky Selsoviet Rural Settlement
- Time zone: UTC+3 (MSK)
- Postal code: 307116
- Dialing code: +7 47144
- OKTMO ID: 38644412116
- Website: мобольшежировский.рф

Kochetok (Russian: Кочеток) is a rural locality (a khutor) in Bolshezhirovsky Selsoviet Rural Settlement, Fatezhsky District, Kursk Oblast, Russia. Population: 22 (2010 census); 49 (2002 census);

== Geography ==
The khutor is located on the Bolshaya Kuritsa River (a right tributary of the Seym River), 107 km from the Russia–Ukraine border, 32 km north-west of Kursk, 15 km south-east of the district center – the town Fatezh, 7 km from the selsoviet center – Bolshoye Zhirovo.

Climate

Kochetok has a warm-summer humid continental climate (Dfb in the Köppen climate classification).

== Transport ==
Kochetok is located 7.5 km from the federal route M-2 Crimea Highway as part of the European route E105, 17 km from the road of regional importance 38K-018 (Kursk – Ponyri), on the road 38K-039 (Fatezh – 38K-018), 22.5 km from the nearest railway halt 517 km (railway line Oryol – Kursk).

The rural locality is situated 33 km from Kursk Vostochny Airport, 155 km from Belgorod International Airport and 220 km from Voronezh Peter the Great Airport.
