= Kislino, Kursk Oblast =

Rural locality in Kursk Oblast, Russia

Kislino Кислино
- Khutor
- Interactive map of Kislino
- Location of Kislino Kislino (Kursk Oblast)
- Coordinates: 51°38′04″N 36°09′01″E
- Country: Russia
- Federal subject: Kursk Oblast
- Administrative district: Kursky District
- SelsovietSelsoviet: Ryshkovsky

Population (2010 Census)
  - Total: 504
  - Estimate (2010): 504 (0%)

Municipal status
  - Municipal district: Kursky Municipal District
  - Rural settlement: Ryshkovsky Selsoviet Rural Settlement
- Time zone: UTC+3 (MSK)
- Postal code: 305524
- Dialing code: +7 4712
- OKTMO ID: 38620476116
- Website: rishkovo.rkursk.ru

Kislino (Russian: Кислино) is a rural locality (a khutor) in Ryshkovsky Selsoviet Rural Settlement, Kursky District, Kursk Oblast, Russia. Population: 504 (2010 census); 449 (2002 census);

== Geography ==
The khutor is located in the Seym River basin (a left tributary of the Desna), 83 km from the Russia–Ukraine border, at the southern border of Kursk, 3 km from the selsoviet center – Ryshkovo.

Streets

There are the following streets in the locality: pereulok 1-y Lermontova, pereulok 2-oy Lermontova, 8 marta, Akhmatovoy, Arkticheskaya, Avangardnaya, Begovaya, Beryozovaya, Bezymyannaya, Blagopoluchnaya, Bumazhnaya, Chekhova, Donskaya, Feta, Fruktovaya, Gagarina, Gogolya, Goncharnaya, Gorokhovaya, Granitnaya, Izumrudnaya, Kazanskaya, Kalinina, Kirpichnaya, Kolkhoznaya, Kompleksnaya, Kosmonavtov, Lenina, Lermontova, Lesnaya, Lva Tolstogo, Lyubimaya, Masterovaya, Mayakovskogo, Mirnaya, Narodnaya, Nekrasova, Novaya, Olkhovaya, pereulok Ostrovskogo, Pesochnaya, Pobedy, Polevaya, Progonnaya, Prostornaya, Pushkina, Sadovaya, Slavyanskaya, Sovetskaya, Schastlivaya, Svetlaya, Svobodnaya, Tikhaya, Tsvetayevoy, Tsentralnaya, Tulskaya, Udachnaya, Uspeshnaya, Varshavskaya, Vatutina, Vesyolaya, Vishnyovaya, Vostochnaya, Voznesenskaya, Yeliseyeva, Yesenina, Yuzhnaya, Zapovednaya, Zelyonaya and Zhukovskogo (1535 houses).

Climate

Kislino has a warm-summer humid continental climate (Dfb in the Köppen climate classification).

== Transport ==
Kislino is located 2 km from the road of intermunicipal significance 38H-416 (Kursk – Petrin), on the road 38H-419 (38H-416 – Kislino – Kukuyevka), 2 km from the nearest railway station Ryshkovo (railway line Lgov I — Kursk).

The rural locality is situated 15 km from Kursk Vostochny Airport, 112 km from Belgorod International Airport and 214 km from Voronezh Peter the Great Airport.
