= Marmyzhi =

Marmyzhi may refer to the following places in Russia:

- Marmyzhi, Fatezhsky District, Kursk Oblast
- Marmyzhi, Konyshyovsky District, Kursk Oblast
- Marmyzhi, Kurchatovsky District, Kursk Oblast
