= Ushakovo, Belgorod Oblast =

Ushakovo Ушаково
- Selo
- Location within Belgorod Oblast Location within Russia
- Coordinates: 50°39′N 36°56′E
- Country: Russia
- Region: Belgorod Oblast
- District: Korochansky District
- Time zone: UTC+3:00

Ushakovo (Russian: Ушаково) is a rural locality (a selo) in Korochansky District, Belgorod Oblast, Russia. The population was 46 as of 2010. There is 1 street.

== Geography ==
Ushakovo is located 31 km southwest of Korocha (the district's administrative centre) by road. Novotroyevka is the nearest rural locality.
