= Ushakovo, Kursky District, Kursk Oblast =

Rural locality in Kursk Oblast, Russia

Ushakovo Ушаково
- Village
- Interactive map of Ushakovo
- Location of Ushakovo Ushakovo (Kursk Oblast)
- Coordinates: 51°48′16″N 36°16′13″E
- Country: Russia
- Federal subject: Kursk Oblast
- Administrative district: Kursky District
- SelsovietSelsoviet: Shchetinsky

Population (2010 Census)
  - Total: 583
  - Estimate (2010): 583 (0%)

Municipal status
  - Municipal district: Kursky Municipal District
  - Rural settlement: Shchetinsky Selsoviet Rural Settlement
- Time zone: UTC+3 (MSK)
- Postal code: 305511
- Dialing code: +7 4712
- OKTMO ID: 38620492131
- Website: shetin.rkursk.ru

Ushakovo (Russian: Ушаково) is a rural locality (Russian: деревня, lit. 'village') in Shchetinsky Selsoviet Rural Settlement, Kursky District, Kursk Oblast, Russia. Population: 583 (2010 census); 614 (2002 census);

== Geography ==
The village is located on the Vinogrobl River (a left tributary of the Tuskar in the basin of the Seym), 101 km from the Russia–Ukraine border, 4 km north-east of the district center – the town Kursk, 3 km from the selsoviet center – Shchetinka.

Climate

Ushakovo has a warm-summer humid continental climate (Dfb in the Köppen climate classification).

Climate data for Ushakovo
Month	Jan	Feb	Mar	Apr	May	Jun	Jul	Aug	Sep	Oct	Nov	Dec	Year
Mean daily maximum °C (°F)	−4.3 (24.3)	−3.4 (25.9)	2.5 (36.5)	12.9 (55.2)	19.3 (66.7)	22.6 (72.7)	25.3 (77.5)	24.6 (76.3)	18 (64)	10.4 (50.7)	3.2 (37.8)	−1.4 (29.5)	10.8 (51.4)
Daily mean °C (°F)	−6.4 (20.5)	−5.9 (21.4)	−1.1 (30.0)	8 (46)	14.6 (58.3)	18.3 (64.9)	20.9 (69.6)	19.9 (67.8)	13.9 (57.0)	7.1 (44.8)	0.9 (33.6)	−3.3 (26.1)	7.2 (45.0)
Mean daily minimum °C (°F)	−8.9 (16.0)	−8.9 (16.0)	−5.1 (22.8)	2.5 (36.5)	8.9 (48.0)	12.9 (55.2)	15.8 (60.4)	14.8 (58.6)	9.6 (49.3)	3.8 (38.8)	−1.4 (29.5)	−5.5 (22.1)	3.2 (37.8)
Average precipitation mm (inches)	51 (2.0)	44 (1.7)	47 (1.9)	50 (2.0)	60 (2.4)	68 (2.7)	70 (2.8)	55 (2.2)	59 (2.3)	59 (2.3)	46 (1.8)	48 (1.9)	657 (26)
Source: https://en.climate-data.org/asia/russian-federation/kursk-oblast/ушаково-666567/

== Transport ==
Ushakovo is located 10 km from the federal route M-2 Crimea Highway (a part of the European route E105), on the road of regional importance 38K-018 (Kursk – Ponyri), on the road of intermunicipal significance 38H-402 (38K-018 – Kamyshi), 1 km from the railway junction 530 km (railway line Oryol – Kursk).

The rural locality is situated 5 km from Kursk Vostochny Airport, 129 km from Belgorod International Airport and 204 km from Voronezh Peter the Great Airport.
