= Ushakovo, Piksimovsky Selsoviet, Vashkinsky District, Vologda Oblast =

Ushakovo Ушаково
- Village
- Location within Vologda Oblast Location within Russia
- Coordinates: 60°25′N 37°40′E
- Country: Russia
- Region: Vologda Oblast
- District: Vashkinsky District
- Time zone: UTC+3:00

Ushakovo (Russian: Ушаково) is a rural locality (a village) in Piksimovskoye Rural Settlement, Vashkinsky District, Vologda Oblast, Russia. The population was 10 as of 2002.

== Geography ==
The distance to Lipin Bor is 36 km, to Piksimovo is 4 km. Isakovo is the nearest rural locality.
