= Ushakovo, Ivanovsky Selsoviet, Vashkinsky District, Vologda Oblast =

Ushakovo Ушаково
- Village
- Location within Vologda Oblast Location within Russia
- Coordinates: 60°39′N 38°03′E
- Country: Russia
- Region: Vologda Oblast
- District: Vashkinsky District
- Time zone: UTC+3:00

Ushakovo (Russian: Ушаково) is a rural locality (a village) in Ivanovskoye Rural Settlement, Vashkinsky District, Vologda Oblast, Russia. The population was 14 as of 2002.

== Geography ==
The distance to Lipin Bor is 57 km, to Ivanovskaya is 2 km. Mytchikovo is the nearest rural locality.
