= Kukuyevka =

Kukuyevka Кукуевка
- Selo
- Location within Belgorod Oblast Location within Russia
- Coordinates: 50°06′N 37°55′E
- Country: Russia
- Region: Belgorod Oblast
- District: Valuysky District
- Time zone: UTC+3:00

Kukuyevka (Russian: Кукуевка) is a rural locality (a selo) and the administrative center of Kukuyevskoye Rural Settlement, Valuysky District, Belgorod Oblast, Russia. The population was 411 as of 2010. There are 4 streets.

== Geography ==
Kukuyevka is located 27 km southwest of Valuyki (the district's administrative centre) by road. Dolgoye is the nearest rural locality.
