= Ushakovo, Republic of Bashkortostan =

Ushakovo Ушаково
- Village
- Location within Bashkortostan Location within Russia
- Coordinates: 54°47′N 55°43′E
- Country: Russia
- Region: Bashkortostan
- District: Ufimsky District
- Time zone: UTC+5:00

Ushakovo (Russian: Ушаково) is a rural locality (a village) in Nikolayevsky Selsoviet, Ufimsky District, Bashkortostan, Russia. The population was 118 as of 2010. There are 10 streets.

== Geography ==
Ushakovo is located 24 km northwest of Ufa (the district's administrative centre) by road. Yagodnaya Polyana is the nearest rural locality.
