= Ushakovo, Vladimir Oblast =

Ushakovo Ушаково
- Village
- Location within Vladimir Oblast Location within Russia
- Coordinates: 55°57′N 40°47′E
- Country: Russia
- Region: Vladimir Oblast
- District: Sudogodsky District
- Time zone: UTC+3:00

Ushakovo (Russian: Ушаково) is a rural locality (a village) in Muromtsevskoye Rural Settlement, Sudogodsky District, Vladimir Oblast, Russia. The population was 4 as of 2010.

== Geography ==
Ushakovo is located 7 km west of Sudogda (the district's administrative centre) by road. Stepachevo is the nearest rural locality.
