= Kukuyevka, Kursky District, Kursk Oblast =

Rural locality in Kursk Oblast, Russia

Kukuyevka Кукуевка
- Village
- Interactive map of Kukuyevka
- Location of Kukuyevka Kukuyevka (Kursk Oblast)
- Coordinates: 51°37′36″N 36°07′39″E
- Country: Russia
- Federal subject: Kursk Oblast
- Administrative district: Kursky District
- SelsovietSelsoviet: Novoposelenovsky

Population (2010 Census)
  - Total: 374
  - Estimate (2010): 374 (0%)

Municipal status
  - Municipal district: Kursky Municipal District
  - Rural settlement: Novoposelenovsky Selsoviet Rural Settlement
- Time zone: UTC+3 (MSK)
- Postal code: 305523
- Dialing code: +7 4712
- OKTMO ID: 38620452126
- Website: novoposel.rkursk.ru

Kukuyevka (Russian: Кукуевка) is a rural locality (Russian: деревня, lit. 'village') in Novoposelenovsky Selsoviet Rural Settlement, Kursky District, Kursk Oblast, Russia. Population: 374 (2010 census); 393 (2002 census);

== Geography ==
The village is located 81 km from the Russia–Ukraine border, 11 km south-west of Kursk, at the еаstern border of the selsoviet center – 1st Tsvetovo.

Streets

There are the following streets in the locality: Beryozovaya, Chistaya, Dachny 1-y pereulok, Dachny 2-y pereulok, Dachny 3-y pereulok, Dachny 4-y pereulok, Dachny 5-y pereulok, Dachny 6-y pereulok, Dachny 7-y pereulok, Dachny 8-y pereulok, Dachny 9-y pereulok, Dachny 10-y pereulok, Dachny 11-y pereulok, Dorozhnaya, Gorodskaya, Iskristaya, Koltsevoy pereulok, Kochetovskaya, Krymskaya, Kurskaya, Lazurnaya, Lesnoy pereulok, Letnyaya, Lugovaya, Luchistaya, Magistralnaya, Mostovoy pereulok, Muzykalnaya, Naberezhnaya, Naberezhny pereulok, Narodnaya, Promyshlennaya, Promyshlenny pereulok, Razdolnaya, Rublevskaya, Rublevsky 1-y pereulok, Rublevsky 2-y pereulok, Rublevsky 3-y pereulok, Svetlaya, Sevastopolskaya, Selikhovskaya, Skazochnaya, Sportivnaya, Schastlivaya, Schastlivaya 2-ya, Shirokaya, Shkolnaya, Shosseynaya, Tsvetochny 1-y pereulok, Tsvetochny 2-y pereulok, Tsvetochny 3-y pereulok, Tsvetochny 4-y pereulok, Tsvetochny 5-y pereulok, Tsvetochny 6-y pereulok, Tsvetochny 7-y pereulok, Tsvetochny 8-y pereulok, Tsvetochny 9-y pereulok, Tsvetochny 10-y pereulok, Tsentralnaya, Tsentralny pereulok, Yagodnaya, Vesyolaya, Voronezhsky kvartal, Zapovednaya 1-ya, Zapovednaya 2-ya, Zapovednaya 3-ya, Zapovedny proyezd and Zapovedny pereulok (599 houses).

Climate

Kukuyevka has a warm-summer humid continental climate (Dfb in the Köppen climate classification).

== Transport ==
Kukuyevka is located on the road of regional importance 38K-010 (M-2 – Ivanino, part of the European route E38), on the roads of intermunicipal significance 38H-842 (an access road to Kursk as a part of the "Crimea Highway") and 38H-222 (38N-842 – Kukuyevka), 3.5 km from the nearest railway station Ryshkovo (railway line Lgov I — Kursk).

The rural locality is situated 18 km from Kursk Vostochny Airport, 112 km from Belgorod International Airport and 215 km from Voronezh Peter the Great Airport.
