= Skripeyevka =

Rural locality in Kursk Oblast, Russia

Skripeyevka Скрипеевка
- Village
- Interactive map of Skripeyevka
- Location of Skripeyevka Skripeyevka (Kursk Oblast)
- Coordinates: 51°58′17″N 35°58′54″E
- Country: Russia
- Federal subject: Kursk Oblast
- Administrative district: Fatezhsky District
- SelsovietSelsoviet: Bolshezhirovsky

Population (2010 Census)
  - Total: 26
  - Estimate (2010): 26 (0%)

Municipal status
  - Municipal district: Fatezhsky Municipal District
  - Rural settlement: Bolshezhirovsky Selsoviet Rural Settlement
- Time zone: UTC+3 (MSK)
- Postal code: 307116
- Dialing code: +7 47144
- OKTMO ID: 38644412151
- Website: мобольшежировский.рф

Skripeyevka (Russian: Скрипеевка) is a rural locality (Russian: деревня, lit. 'village') in Bolshezhirovsky Selsoviet Rural Settlement, Fatezhsky District, Kursk Oblast, Russia. Population: 26 (2010 census); 24 (2002 census);

== Geography ==
The village is located 101 km from the Russia–Ukraine border, 30 km north-west of Kursk, 15 km south-east of the district center – the town Fatezh, 1 km from the selsoviet center – Bolshoye Zhirovo.

Climate

Skripeyevka has a warm-summer humid continental climate (Dfb in the Köppen climate classification).

== Transport ==
Skripeyevka is located 1.5 km from the federal route M-2 Crimea Highway as part of the European route E105, 22 km from the road of regional importance 38K-018 (Kursk – Ponyri), 5.5 km from the road 38K-039 (Fatezh – 38K-018), on the road of intermunicipal significance 38Н-819 (Bolshoye Zhirovo – Skripeyevka – Kutasovka), 24 km from the nearest railway halt 521 km (railway line Oryol – Kursk).

The rural locality is situated 32 km from Kursk Vostochny Airport, 152 km from Belgorod International Airport and 224 km from Voronezh Peter the Great Airport.
