= Kromskaya, Kursk Oblast =

Rural locality in Kursk Oblast, Russia

Kromskaya Кромская
- Village
- Interactive map of Kromskaya
- Location of Kromskaya Kromskaya (Kursk Oblast)
- Coordinates: 51°56′05″N 35°44′27″E
- Country: Russia
- Federal subject: Kursk Oblast
- Administrative district: Fatezhsky District
- SelsovietSelsoviet: Bolshezhirovsky
- Elevation: 240 m (790 ft)

Population (2010 Census)
  - Total: 24
  - Estimate (2010): 24 (0%)

Municipal status
  - Municipal district: Fatezhsky Municipal District
  - Rural settlement: Bolshezhirovsky Selsoviet Rural Settlement
- Time zone: UTC+3 (MSK)
- Postal code: 307113
- Dialing code: +7 47144
- OKTMO ID: 38644412206
- Website: мобольшежировский.рф

Kromskaya (Russian: Кромская) is a rural locality (Russian: деревня, lit. 'village') in Bolshezhirovsky Selsoviet Rural Settlement, Fatezhsky District, Kursk Oblast, Russia. Population: 24 (2010 census); 43 (2002 census);

== Geography ==
The village is located on the Gryaznaya Rudka Brook (a right tributary of the Ruda in the basin of the Svapa), 89 km from the Russia–Ukraine border, 38 km north-west of Kursk, 19 km south-west of the district center – the town Fatezh, 16 km from the selsoviet center – Bolshoye Zhirovo.

Climate

Kromskaya has a warm-summer humid continental climate (Dfb in the Köppen climate classification).

== Transport ==
Kromskaya is located 14 km from the federal route M-2 Crimea Highway as part of the European route E105, 18.5 km from the road of regional importance 38K-038 (Fatezh – Dmitriyev), on the road of intermunicipal significance 38H-221 (M2 "Crimea Highway" – Kromskaya), 30 km from the nearest railway halt 552 km (railway line Navlya – Lgov-Kiyevsky).

The rural locality is situated 42 km from Kursk Vostochny Airport, 154 km from Belgorod International Airport and 240 km from Voronezh Peter the Great Airport.
