= Bolshoye Zhirovo =

Rural locality in Kursk Oblast, Russia

Bolshoye Zhirovo Большое Жирово
- Selo
- Interactive map of Bolshoye Zhirovo
- Location of Bolshoye Zhirovo Bolshoye Zhirovo (Kursk Oblast)
- Coordinates: 51°57′49″N 35°57′52″E
- Country: Russia
- Federal subject: Kursk Oblast
- Administrative district: Fatezhsky District
- SelsovietSelsoviet: Bolshezhirovsky
- Elevation: 244 m (801 ft)

Population (2010 Census)
  - Total: 542
  - Estimate (2010): 542 (0%)

Administrative status
  - Capital of: Bolshezhirovsky Selsoviet

Municipal status
  - Municipal district: Fatezhsky Municipal District
  - Rural settlement: Bolshezhirovsky Selsoviet Rural Settlement
  - Capital of: Bolshezhirovsky Selsoviet Rural Settlement
- Time zone: UTC+3 (MSK)
- Postal code: 307116
- Dialing code: +7 47144
- OKTMO ID: 38644412101
- Website: мобольшежировский.рф

Bolshoye Zhirovo (Russian: Большое Жирово) is a rural locality (Russian: село, lit. 'village') and the administrative center of Bolshezhirovsky Selsoviet Rural Settlement, Fatezhsky District, Kursk Oblast, Russia. Population: 542 (2010 census); 513 (2002 census);

== Geography ==
The village is located 100 km from the Russia–Ukraine border, 29 km north-west of Kursk, 15 km south-east of the district center – the town Fatezh.

Climate

Bolshoye Zhirovo has a warm-summer humid continental climate (Dfb in the Köppen climate classification).

Climate data for Bolshoye Zhirovo
Month	Jan	Feb	Mar	Apr	May	Jun	Jul	Aug	Sep	Oct	Nov	Dec	Year
Mean daily maximum °C (°F)	−4.5 (23.9)	−3.6 (25.5)	2.1 (35.8)	12.5 (54.5)	18.9 (66.0)	22.2 (72.0)	24.9 (76.8)	24.1 (75.4)	17.7 (63.9)	10.1 (50.2)	3 (37)	−1.5 (29.3)	10.5 (50.9)
Daily mean °C (°F)	−6.5 (20.3)	−6.1 (21.0)	−1.4 (29.5)	7.7 (45.9)	14.3 (57.7)	17.9 (64.2)	20.5 (68.9)	19.6 (67.3)	13.6 (56.5)	6.9 (44.4)	0.8 (33.4)	−3.4 (25.9)	7.0 (44.6)
Mean daily minimum °C (°F)	−9 (16)	−9.1 (15.6)	−5.4 (22.3)	2.3 (36.1)	8.7 (47.7)	12.6 (54.7)	15.5 (59.9)	14.5 (58.1)	9.4 (48.9)	3.6 (38.5)	−1.5 (29.3)	−5.6 (21.9)	3.0 (37.4)
Average precipitation mm (inches)	52 (2.0)	45 (1.8)	47 (1.9)	51 (2.0)	62 (2.4)	74 (2.9)	76 (3.0)	57 (2.2)	61 (2.4)	60 (2.4)	48 (1.9)	50 (2.0)	683 (26.9)
Source: https://en.climate-data.org/asia/russian-federation/kursk-oblast/большое-жирово-290739/

== Transport ==
Bolshoye Zhirovo is located on the federal route M-2 Crimea Highway as part of the European route E105, 17 km from the road of regional importance 38K-038 (Fatezh – Dmitriyev), on the road of intermunicipal significance 38Н-819 (Bolshoye Zhirovo – Skripeyevka – Kutasovka), 25 km from the nearest railway halt 521 km (railway line Oryol – Kursk).

The rural locality is situated 31.5 km from Kursk Vostochny Airport, 151 km from Belgorod International Airport and 225 km from Voronezh Peter the Great Airport.
