= Fatezh =

Town in Kursk Oblast, Russia

Fatezh Фатеж
- Town
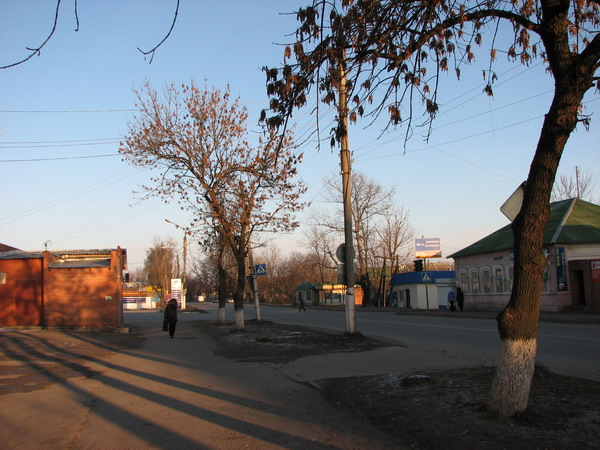
- A street in Fatezh

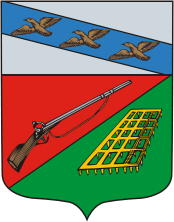
- Coat of arms
- Interactive map of Fatezh
- Location of Fatezh Fatezh (Kursk Oblast)
- Coordinates: 52°06′N 35°51′E
- Country: Russia
- Federal subject: Kursk Oblast
- Administrative district: Fatezhsky District
- Town of district significanceSelsoviet: Fatezh
- Founded: 17th century
- Town status since: 1779
- Elevation: 200 m (660 ft)

Population (2010 Census)
  - Total: 5,404
  - Estimate (2024): 4,592 (−15%)

Administrative status
  - Capital of: Fatezhsky District, town of district significance of Fatezh

Municipal status
  - Municipal district: Fatezhsky Municipal District
  - Urban settlement: Fatezh Urban Settlement
  - Capital of: Fatezhsky Municipal District, Fatezh Urban Settlement
- Time zone: UTC+3 (MSK)
- Postal codes: 307100, 307139
- OKTMO ID: 38644101001

Fatezh (Russian: Фате́ж) is a town and the administrative center of Fatezhsky District in Kursk Oblast, Russia, located on the Usozha River 45 kilometers (28 mi) north of Kursk, the administrative center of the oblast. Population: 4,691 (2021 census); 5,404 (2010 census); 5,710 (2002 census); 5,712 (1989 Soviet census). 4,959 (1897).

== History and etymology ==
It was founded as a village in the 17th century and granted town status in 1779. Fatezh took its name from a local stream; the etymology is uncertain, but it may be based on the given names Foty or Iosafat in diminutive form (place names in -ezh are common in the region). During World War II, Fatezh was occupied by German troops from October 22, 1941 to February 7, 1943.

== Administrative and municipal status ==
Within the framework of administrative divisions, Fatezh serves as the administrative center of Fatezhsky District. As an administrative division, it is incorporated within Fatezhsky District as the town of district significance of Fatezh. As a municipal division, the town of district significance of Fatezh is incorporated within Fatezhsky Municipal District as Fatezh Urban Settlement.

== Literary references ==
In Vasily Narezhny's 1814 novel A Russian Gil Blas (Российский Жильблаз), the picaresque hero leaves his home village in Kursk Governorate to go to Moscow; after two weeks of traveling he reaches a magnificent city he is sure must be Moscow, but when he asks a passing policeman it turns out to be Fatezh.

== Notable people ==
Fatezh is the birthplace of composer Georgy Sviridov.
