= Krasivy, Kursk Oblast =

Rural locality in Kursk Oblast, Russia

Krasivy Красивый
- Settlement
- Interactive map of Krasivy
- Location of Krasivy Krasivy (Kursk Oblast)
- Coordinates: 52°00′38″N 35°46′25″E
- Country: Russia
- Federal subject: Kursk Oblast
- Administrative district: Fatezhsky District
- SelsovietSelsoviet: Soldatsky

Population (2010 Census)
  - Total: 5
  - Estimate (2010): 5 (0%)

Municipal status
  - Municipal district: Fatezhsky Municipal District
  - Rural settlement: Soldatsky Selsoviet Rural Settlement
- Time zone: UTC+3 (MSK)
- Postal code: 307111
- Dialing code: +7 47144
- OKTMO ID: 38644468196
- Website: мосолдатский.рф

Krasivy (Russian: Красивый) is a rural locality (a settlement) in Soldatsky Selsoviet Rural Settlement, Fatezhsky District, Kursk Oblast, Russia. Population: 5 (2010 census); 14 (2002 census); 70 (1989 Soviet census).

== Geography ==
The settlement is located on the Zhuravchik River (a right tributary of the Ruda in the basin of the Svapa), 96 km from the Russia–Ukraine border, 41 km north-west of Kursk, 9 km south-west of the district center – the town Fatezh, 7.5 km from the selsoviet center – Soldatskoye.

Climate

Krasivy has a warm-summer humid continental climate (Dfb in the Köppen climate classification).

== Transport ==
Krasivy is located 7.5 km from the federal route M-2 Crimea Highway as part of the European route E105, 10 km from the road of regional importance 38K-038 (Fatezh – Dmitriyev), 0.5 km from the road of intermunicipal significance 38Н-826 (Alisovo-Pokrovskoye – Kofanovka), 34 km from the nearest railway halt 29 km (railway line Arbuzovo – Luzhki-Orlovskiye).

The rural locality is situated 45 km from Kursk Vostochny Airport, 160 km from Belgorod International Airport and 238 km from Voronezh Peter the Great Airport.
