= Rudka, Fatezhsky District, Kursk Oblast =

Rural locality in Kursk Oblast, Russia

Rudka Рудка
- Village
- Interactive map of Rudka
- Location of Rudka Rudka (Kursk Oblast)
- Coordinates: 52°00′10″N 35°43′34″E
- Country: Russia
- Federal subject: Kursk Oblast
- Administrative district: Fatezhsky District
- SelsovietSelsoviet: Soldatsky

Population (2010 Census)
  - Total: 28
  - Estimate (2010): 28 (0%)

Municipal status
  - Municipal district: Fatezhsky Municipal District
  - Rural settlement: Soldatsky Selsoviet Rural Settlement
- Time zone: UTC+3 (MSK)
- Postal code: 307111
- Dialing code: +7 47144
- OKTMO ID: 38644468241
- Website: мосолдатский.рф

Rudka (Russian: Рудка) is a rural locality (Russian: деревня, lit. 'village') in Soldatsky Selsoviet Rural Settlement, Fatezhsky District, Kursk Oblast, Russia. The population as of 2010 is 28.

== Geography ==
The village is located on the Ruda River (a link tributary of the Usozha in the basin of the Svapa), 92 km from the Russia–Ukraine border, 44 km north-west of Kursk, 12.5 km south-west of the district center – the town Fatezh, 8 km from the selsoviet center – Soldatskoye.

=== Climate ===
Rudka has a warm-summer humid continental climate (Dfb in the Köppen climate classification).

== Transport ==
Rudka is located 10.5 km from the federal route M-2 Crimea Highway as part of the European route E105, 11 km from the road of regional importance 38K-038 (Fatezh – Dmitriyev), 1.5 km from the road of intermunicipal significance 38Н-679 (38K-038 – Soldatskoye – Shuklino), on the road 38Н-680 (38N-679 – Alisovo), 31 km from the nearest railway halt 552 km (railway line Navlya – Lgov-Kiyevsky).

The rural locality is situated 47 km from Kursk Vostochny Airport, 161 km from Belgorod International Airport and 242 km from Voronezh Peter the Great Airport.
