= Solovyovka =

Solovyovka may refer to:

- Solovyovka (Bashkortostan)
- Solovyovka, Fatezhsky District, Kursk Oblast
- Solovyovka (Novosibirsk Oblast)
