= Rebender =

Rural locality in Kursk Oblast, Russia

Rebender Ребендер
- Settlement
- Interactive map of Rebender
- Location of Rebender Rebender (Kursk Oblast)
- Coordinates: 51°58′21″N 35°47′17″E
- Country: Russia
- Federal subject: Kursk Oblast
- Administrative district: Fatezhsky District
- SelsovietSelsoviet: Soldatsky

Population (2010 Census)
  - Total: 14
  - Estimate (2010): 14 (0%)

Municipal status
  - Municipal district: Fatezhsky Municipal District
  - Rural settlement: Soldatsky Selsoviet Rural Settlement
- Time zone: UTC+3 (MSK)
- Postal code: 307111
- Dialing code: +7 47144
- OKTMO ID: 38644468231
- Website: мосолдатский.рф

Rebender (Russian: Ребендер) is a rural locality (a settlement) in Soldatsky Selsoviet Rural Settlement, Fatezhsky District, Kursk Oblast, Russia. The population as of 2010 is 14.

== Geography ==
The settlement is located in the Nikovets River basin (a right tributary of the Ruda in the basin of the Svapa), 96 km from the Russia–Ukraine border, 38 km north-west of Kursk, 13 km south-west of the district center – the town Fatezh, 12 km from the selsoviet center – Soldatskoye.

=== Climate ===
Rebender has a warm-summer humid continental climate (Dfb in the Köppen climate classification).

== Transport ==
Rebender is located 9 km from the federal route M-2 Crimea Highway as part of the European route E105, 14 km from the road of regional importance 38K-038 (Fatezh – Dmitriyev), 2.5 km from the road of intermunicipal significance 38Н-826 (Alisovo-Pokrovskoye – Kofanovka), 34 km from the nearest railway halt 552 km (railway line Navlya – Lgov-Kiyevsky).

The rural locality is situated 42 km from Kursk Vostochny Airport, 156 km from Belgorod International Airport and 237 km from Voronezh Peter the Great Airport.
