= Nizhniye Khalchi =

Rural locality in Kursk Oblast, Russia

Nizhniye Khalchi Нижние Халчи
- Village
- Interactive map of Nizhniye Khalchi
- Location of Nizhniye Khalchi Nizhniye Khalchi (Kursk Oblast)
- Coordinates: 52°02′19″N 35°40′27″E
- Country: Russia
- Federal subject: Kursk Oblast
- Administrative district: Fatezhsky District
- SelsovietSelsoviet: Soldatsky

Population (2010 Census)
  - Total: 186
  - Estimate (2010): 186 (0%)

Municipal status
  - Municipal district: Fatezhsky Municipal District
  - Rural settlement: Soldatsky Selsoviet Rural Settlement
- Time zone: UTC+3 (MSK)
- Postal code: 307105
- Dialing code: +7 47144
- OKTMO ID: 38644468251
- Website: мосолдатский.рф

Nizhniye Khalchi (Russian: Нижние Халчи) is a rural locality (Russian: деревня, lit. 'village') in Soldatsky Selsoviet Rural Settlement, Fatezhsky District, Kursk Oblast, Russia. The population as of 2010 is 186.

== Geography ==
The village is located on the Khalchi River (a link tributary of the Usozha in the basin of the Svapa), 89 km from the Russia–Ukraine border, 47 km north-west of Kursk, 13 km south-west of the district center – the town Fatezh, 6 km from the selsoviet center – Soldatskoye.

=== Climate ===
Nizhniye Khalchi has a warm-summer humid continental climate (Dfb in the Köppen climate classification).

Climate data for Nizhniye Khalchi
Month	Jan	Feb	Mar	Apr	May	Jun	Jul	Aug	Sep	Oct	Nov	Dec	Year
Mean daily maximum °C (°F)	−4.3 (24.3)	−3.4 (25.9)	2.4 (36.3)	12.7 (54.9)	19 (66)	22.3 (72.1)	24.9 (76.8)	24.2 (75.6)	17.8 (64.0)	10.2 (50.4)	3.1 (37.6)	−1.4 (29.5)	10.6 (51.1)
Daily mean °C (°F)	−6.3 (20.7)	−5.8 (21.6)	−1 (30)	8 (46)	14.5 (58.1)	18.1 (64.6)	20.7 (69.3)	19.7 (67.5)	13.7 (56.7)	7 (45)	1 (34)	−3.3 (26.1)	7.2 (45.0)
Mean daily minimum °C (°F)	−8.7 (16.3)	−8.7 (16.3)	−4.9 (23.2)	2.6 (36.7)	9 (48)	12.9 (55.2)	15.7 (60.3)	14.7 (58.5)	9.6 (49.3)	3.9 (39.0)	−1.3 (29.7)	−5.4 (22.3)	3.3 (37.9)
Average precipitation mm (inches)	52 (2.0)	45 (1.8)	47 (1.9)	51 (2.0)	62 (2.4)	73 (2.9)	77 (3.0)	57 (2.2)	60 (2.4)	60 (2.4)	48 (1.9)	50 (2.0)	682 (26.9)
Source: https://en.climate-data.org/asia/russian-federation/kursk-oblast/нижние-халчи-687151/

== Transport ==
Nizhniye Khalchi is located 11 km from the federal route M-2 Crimea Highway as part of the European route E105, 7 km from the road of regional importance 38K-038 (Fatezh – Dmitriyev), 2 km from the road of intermunicipal significance 38Н-679 (38K-038 – Soldatskoye – Shuklino), on the road 38Н-681 (38N-679 – Verkhniye Khalchi), 27 km from the nearest railway halt 29 km (railway line Arbuzovo – Luzhki-Orlovskiye).

The rural locality is situated 52 km from Kursk Vostochny Airport, 165 km from Belgorod International Airport and 245 km from Voronezh Peter the Great Airport.
