= Nadezhda, Kursk Oblast =

Rural locality in Kursk Oblast, Russia

Nadezhda Надежда
- Khutor
- Interactive map of Nadezhda
- Location of Nadezhda Nadezhda (Kursk Oblast)
- Coordinates: 51°59′30″N 35°43′10″E
- Country: Russia
- Federal subject: Kursk Oblast
- Administrative district: Fatezhsky District
- SelsovietSelsoviet: Soldatsky

Population (2010 Census)
  - Total: 1
  - Estimate (2010): 1 (0%)

Municipal status
  - Municipal district: Fatezhsky Municipal District
  - Rural settlement: Soldatsky Selsoviet Rural Settlement
- Time zone: UTC+3 (MSK)
- Postal code: 307111
- Dialing code: +7 47144
- OKTMO ID: 38644468211
- Website: мосолдатский.рф

Nadezhda (Russian: Надежда) is a rural locality (a khutor) in Soldatsky Selsoviet Rural Settlement, Fatezhsky District, Kursk Oblast, Russia. The population as of 2010 is 1.

== Geography ==
The khutor is located on the Ruda River (a link tributary of the Usozha in the basin of the Svapa) and its tributary, Nikovets, 92 km from the Russia–Ukraine border, 43 km north-west of Kursk, 13.5 km south-west of the district center – the town Fatezh, 9 km from the selsoviet center – Soldatskoye.

=== Climate ===
Nadezhda has a warm-summer humid continental climate (Dfb in the Köppen climate classification).

== Transport ==
Nadezhda is located 13 km from the federal route M-2 Crimea Highway as part of the European route E105, 12 km from the road of regional importance 38K-038 (Fatezh – Dmitriyev), 2 km from the road of intermunicipal significance 38Н-679 (38K-038 – Soldatskoye – Shuklino), 1 km from the road 38Н-680 (38N-679 – Alisovo), 30 km from the nearest railway halt 552 km (railway line Navlya – Lgov-Kiyevsky).

The rural locality is situated 47 km from Kursk Vostochny Airport, 160 km from Belgorod International Airport and 242 km from Voronezh Peter the Great Airport.
