= Prelestny =

Rural locality in Kursk Oblast, Russia

Prelestny Прелестный
- Khutor
- Interactive map of Prelestny
- Location of Prelestny Prelestny (Kursk Oblast)
- Coordinates: 52°00′42″N 35°45′54″E
- Country: Russia
- Federal subject: Kursk Oblast
- Administrative district: Fatezhsky District
- SelsovietSelsoviet: Soldatsky

Population (2010 Census)
  - Total: 8
  - Estimate (2010): 8 (0%)

Municipal status
  - Municipal district: Fatezhsky Municipal District
  - Rural settlement: Soldatsky Selsoviet Rural Settlement
- Time zone: UTC+3 (MSK)
- Postal code: 307111
- Dialing code: +7 47144
- OKTMO ID: 38644468221
- Website: мосолдатский.рф

Prelestny (Russian: Прелестный) is a rural locality (a khutor) in Soldatsky Selsoviet Rural Settlement, Fatezhsky District, Kursk Oblast, Russia. The population as of 2010 is 8.

== Geography ==
The khutor is located on the Zhuravchik River (a right tributary of the Ruda in the basin of the Svapa), 95 km from the Russia–Ukraine border, 42 km north-west of Kursk, 9 km south-west of the district center – the town Fatezh, 7 km from the selsoviet center – Soldatskoye.

=== Climate ===
Prelestny has a warm-summer humid continental climate (Dfb in the Köppen climate classification).

== Transport ==
Prelestny is located 8 km from the federal route M-2 Crimea Highway as part of the European route E105, 10 km from the road of regional importance 38K-038 (Fatezh – Dmitriyev), 1 km from the road of intermunicipal significance 38Н-826 (Alisovo-Pokrovskoye – Kofanovka), 33.5 km from the nearest railway halt 29 km (railway line Arbuzovo – Luzhki-Orlovskiye).

The rural locality is situated 45 km from Kursk Vostochny Airport, 161 km from Belgorod International Airport and 239 km from Voronezh Peter the Great Airport.
