= Podymovka, Kursk Oblast =

Rural locality in Kursk Oblast, Russia

Podymovka Подымовка
- Village
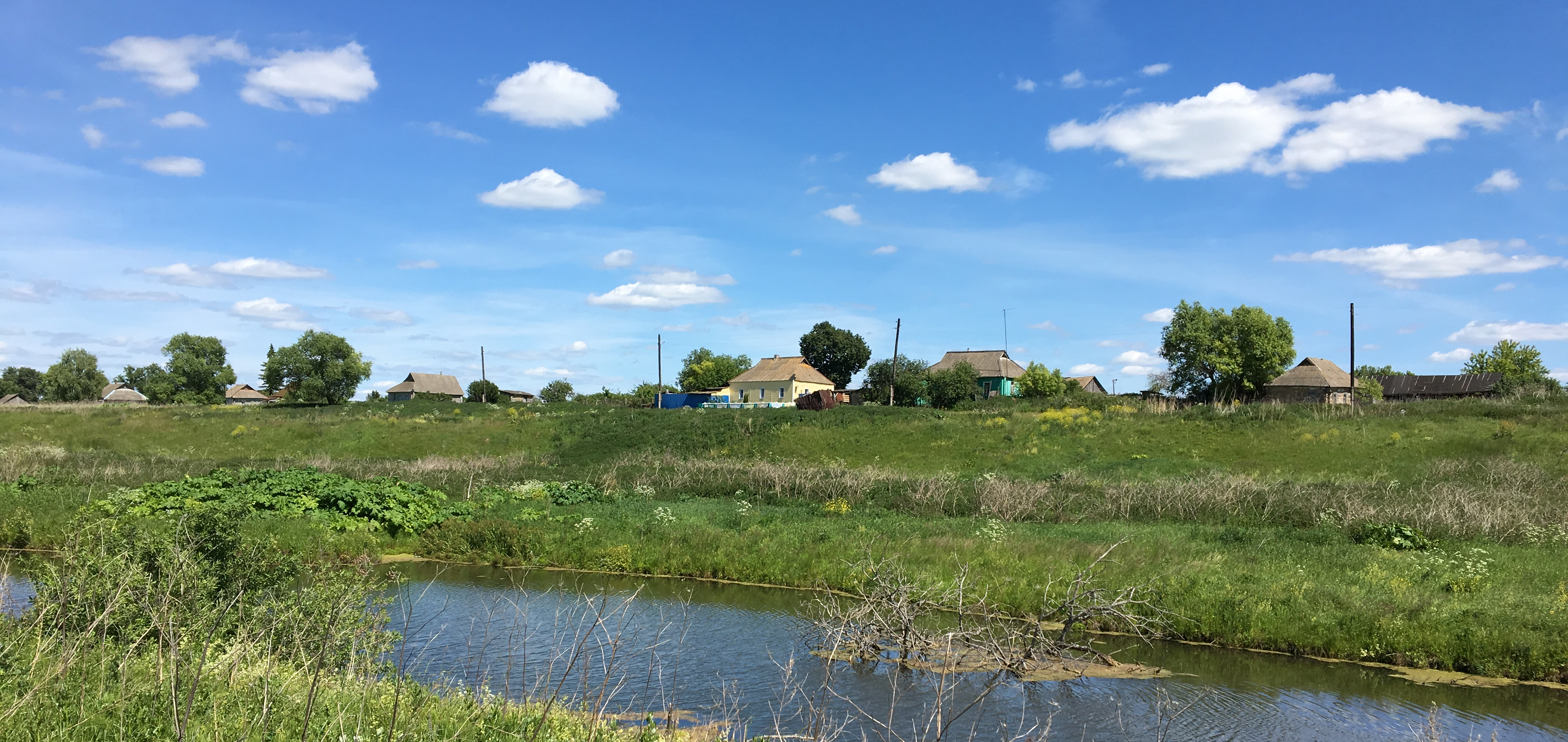
- Interactive map of Podymovka
- Location of Podymovka Podymovka (Kursk Oblast)
- Coordinates: 52°02′46″N 35°36′37″E
- Country: Russia
- Federal subject: Kursk Oblast
- Administrative district: Fatezhsky District
- SelsovietSelsoviet: Soldatsky
- Elevation: 201 m (659 ft)

Population (2010 Census)
  - Total: 13
  - Estimate (2010): 13 (0%)

Municipal status
  - Municipal district: Fatezhsky Municipal District
  - Rural settlement: Soldatsky Selsoviet Rural Settlement
- Time zone: UTC+3 (MSK)
- Postal code: 307105
- Dialing code: +7 47144
- OKTMO ID: 38644468266
- Website: мосолдатский.рф

Podymovka (Russian: Подымовка) is a rural locality (Russian: деревня, lit. 'village') in Soldatsky Selsoviet Rural Settlement, Fatezhsky District, Kursk Oblast, Russia. The population as of 2010 is 13.

== Geography ==
The village is located on the Radubezhsky Brook (a link tributary of the Usozha in the basin of the Svapa), 86 km from the Russia–Ukraine border, 53 km north-west of Kursk, 17 km south-west of the district center – the town Fatezh, 9.5 km from the selsoviet center – Soldatskoye.

=== Climate ===
Podymovka has a warm-summer humid continental climate (Dfb in the Köppen climate classification).

== Transport ==
Podymovka is located 15 km from the federal route M-2 Crimea Highway as part of the European route E105, 6 km from the road of regional importance 38K-038 (Fatezh – Dmitriyev), 9.5 km from the road 38K-005 (Konyshyovka – Zhigayevo – 38K-038), 6.5 km from the road of intermunicipal significance 38Н-679 (38K-038 – Soldatskoye – Shuklino), 4 km from the road 38Н-681 (38N-679 – Verkhniye Khalchi), on the road 38Н-682 (38N-681 – Podymovka – Proletarovka), 23 km from the nearest railway halt Mitsen (railway line Arbuzovo – Luzhki-Orlovskiye).

The rural locality is situated 56.5 km from Kursk Vostochny Airport, 168 km from Belgorod International Airport and 250 km from Voronezh Peter the Great Airport.
