= Lyubimovka =

Lyubimovka (Russian: Любимовка), often refers to rural localities in Russia.

== Places ==
- Lyubimovka, Bashkortostan
- Lyubimovka, Bolshesoldatsky District, Kursk Oblast
- Lyubimovka, Fatezhsky District, Kursk Oblast
- Lyubimovka, Korenevsky District, Kursk Oblast
- Lyubimovka, Medvensky District, Kursk Oblast

== Other ==
- Lyubimovka (festival), Russian theater festival

== See also ==
- Liubymivka (disambiguation)
