= Brigadirovo =

Rural locality in Kursk Oblast, Russia

Brigadirovo Бригадирово
- Village
- Interactive map of Brigadirovo
- Location of Brigadirovo Brigadirovo (Kursk Oblast)
- Coordinates: 51°57′53″N 35°43′07″E
- Country: Russia
- Federal subject: Kursk Oblast
- Administrative district: Fatezhsky District
- SelsovietSelsoviet: Soldatsky
- Elevation: 233 m (764 ft)

Population (2010 Census)
  - Total: 19
  - Estimate (2010): 19 (0%)

Municipal status
  - Municipal district: Fatezhsky Municipal District
  - Rural settlement: Soldatsky Selsoviet Rural Settlement
- Time zone: UTC+3 (MSK)
- Postal code: 307111
- Dialing code: +7 47144
- OKTMO ID: 38644468171
- Website: мосолдатский.рф

Brigadirovo (Russian: Бригадирово) is a rural locality (Russian: деревня, lit. 'village') in Soldatsky Selsoviet Rural Settlement, Fatezhsky District, Kursk Oblast, Russia.

== Geography ==
The village is located on the Gryaznaya Rudka River (a right tributary of the Ruda in the basin of the Svapa), 91 km from the Russia–Ukraine border, 41 km north-west of Kursk, 16 km south-west of the district center – the town Fatezh, 12.5 km from the selsoviet center – Soldatskoye.

== Climate and population ==
Brigadirovo has a warm-summer humid continental climate (Dfb in the Köppen climate classification). Population: 19 (2010 census); 41 (2002 census); 70 (1989 Soviet census).

== Transport ==
Brigadirovo is located 14 km from the federal route M-2 Crimea Highway as part of the European route E105, 15 km from the road of regional importance 38K-038 (Fatezh – Dmitriyev), 4 km from the road of intermunicipal significance 38Н-679 (38K-038 – Soldatskoye – Shuklino), 29 km from the nearest railway halt 552 km (railway line Navlya – Lgov-Kiyevsky).

The rural locality is situated 45.5 km from Kursk Vostochny Airport, 157 km from Belgorod International Airport and 242 km from Voronezh Peter the Great Airport.
