= Krasny Kamysh =

Rural locality in Kursk Oblast, Russia

Krasny Kamysh Красный Камыш
- Khutor
- Interactive map of Krasny Kamysh
- Location of Krasny Kamysh Krasny Kamysh (Kursk Oblast)
- Coordinates: 52°01′50″N 35°45′27″E
- Country: Russia
- Federal subject: Kursk Oblast
- Administrative district: Fatezhsky District
- SelsovietSelsoviet: Soldatsky

Population (2010 Census)
  - Total: 11
  - Estimate (2010): 11 (0%)

Municipal status
  - Municipal district: Fatezhsky Municipal District
  - Rural settlement: Soldatsky Selsoviet Rural Settlement
- Time zone: UTC+3 (MSK)
- Postal code: 307111
- Dialing code: +7 47144
- OKTMO ID: 38644468201
- Website: мосолдатский.рф

Krasny Kamysh (Russian: Красный Камыш) is a rural locality (a khutor) in Soldatsky Selsoviet Rural Settlement, Fatezhsky District, Kursk Oblast, Russia. Population: 11 (2010 census); 25 (2002 census); 24 (1989 Soviet census).

== Geography ==
The khutor is located on the Ruda River (a link tributary of the Usozha in the basin of the Svapa), 95 km from the Russia–Ukraine border, 44 km north-west of Kursk, 8.5 km south-west of the district center – the town Fatezh, 5 km from the selsoviet center – Soldatskoye.

Climate

Krasny Kamysh has a warm-summer humid continental climate (Dfb in the Köppen climate classification).

== Transport ==
Krasny Kamysh is located 7 km from the federal route M-2 Crimea Highway as part of the European route E105, 8 km from the road of regional importance 38K-038 (Fatezh – Dmitriyev), 2.5 km from the road of intermunicipal significance 38Н-679 (38K-038 – Soldatskoye – Shuklino), 31.5 km from the nearest railway halt 29 km (railway line Arbuzovo – Luzhki-Orlovskiye).

The rural locality is situated 47 km from Kursk Vostochny Airport, 163 km from Belgorod International Airport and 240 km from Voronezh Peter the Great Airport.
