= Morozov, Fatezhsky District, Kursk Oblast =

Rural locality in Kursk Oblast, Russia

Morozov Морозов
- Khutor
- Interactive map of Morozov
- Location of Morozov Morozov (Kursk Oblast)
- Coordinates: 51°58′22″N 35°40′54″E
- Country: Russia
- Federal subject: Kursk Oblast
- Administrative district: Fatezhsky District
- SelsovietSelsoviet: Soldatsky

Population (2010 Census)
  - Total: 37
  - Estimate (2010): 37 (0%)

Municipal status
  - Municipal district: Fatezhsky Municipal District
  - Rural settlement: Soldatsky Selsoviet Rural Settlement
- Time zone: UTC+3 (MSK)
- Postal code: 307112
- Dialing code: +7 47144
- OKTMO ID: 38644468296
- Website: мосолдатский.рф

Morozov (Russian: Морозов) is a rural locality (a khutor) in Soldatsky Selsoviet Rural Settlement, Fatezhsky District, Kursk Oblast, Russia. The population as of 2010 is 37.

== Geography ==
The khutor is located on the Ruda River (a link tributary of the Usozha in the basin of the Svapa), 88 km from the Russia–Ukraine border, 43 km north-west of Kursk, 16 km south-west of the district center – the town Fatezh, 12 km from the selsoviet center – Soldatskoye.

=== Climate ===
Morozov has a warm-summer humid continental climate (Dfb in the Köppen climate classification).

== Transport ==
Morozov is located 15 km from the federal route M-2 Crimea Highway as part of the European route E105, 14 km from the road of regional importance 38K-038 (Fatezh – Dmitriyev), on the road of intermunicipal significance 38Н-679 (38K-038 – Soldatskoye – Shuklino), 26 km from the nearest railway halt 552 km (railway line Navlya – Lgov-Kiyevsky).

The rural locality is situated 48 km from Kursk Vostochny Airport, 158 km from Belgorod International Airport and 245 km from Voronezh Peter the Great Airport.
