= Vesyoly, Soldatsky selsovet, Fatezhsky District, Kursk Oblast =

Rural locality in Kursk Oblast, Russia

Vesyoly Весёлый
- Khutor
- Interactive map of Vesyoly
- Location of Vesyoly Vesyoly (Kursk Oblast)
- Coordinates: 52°03′33″N 35°41′18″E
- Country: Russia
- Federal subject: Kursk Oblast
- Administrative district: Fatezhsky District
- SelsovietSelsoviet: Soldatsky
- Elevation: 172 m (564 ft)

Population (2010 Census)
  - Total: 5
  - Estimate (2010): 5 (0%)

Municipal status
  - Municipal district: Fatezhsky Municipal District
  - Rural settlement: Soldatsky Selsoviet Rural Settlement
- Time zone: UTC+3 (MSK)
- Postal code: 307106
- Dialing code: +7 47144
- OKTMO ID: 38644468111
- Website: мосолдатский.рф

Vesyoly (Russian: Весёлый) is a rural locality (a khutor) in Soldatsky Selsoviet Rural Settlement, Fatezhsky District, Kursk Oblast, Russia. Population: 5 (2010 census); 17 (2002 census); 35 (1989 Soviet census).

== Geography ==
The khutor is located on the Khalchi River (a link tributary of the Usozha in the basin of the Svapa), 92 km from the Russia–Ukraine border, 50 km north-west of Kursk, 10.5 km south-west of the district center – the town Fatezh, 3.5 km from the selsoviet center – Soldatskoye.

Climate

Vesyoly has a warm-summer humid continental climate (Dfb in the Köppen climate classification).

== Transport ==
Vesyoly is located 9 km from the federal route M-2 Crimea Highway as part of the European route E105, 5 km from the road of regional importance 38K-038 (Fatezh – Dmitriyev), 2 km from the road of intermunicipal significance 38Н-679 (38K-038 – Soldatskoye – Shuklino), 26 km from the nearest railway halt 29 km (railway line Arbuzovo – Luzhki-Orlovskiye).

The rural locality is situated 53 km from Kursk Vostochny Airport, 167 km from Belgorod International Airport and 245 km from Voronezh Peter the Great Airport.
