= Portina =

Rural locality in Kursk Oblast, Russia

Portina Портина
- Village
- Interactive map of Portina
- Location of Portina Portina (Kursk Oblast)
- Coordinates: 52°04′36″N 35°45′52″E
- Country: Russia
- Federal subject: Kursk Oblast
- Administrative district: Fatezhsky District
- SelsovietSelsoviet: Rusanovsky
- Elevation: 179 m (587 ft)

Population (2010 Census)
  - Total: 20
  - Estimate (2010): 20 (0%)

Municipal status
  - Municipal district: Fatezhsky Municipal District
  - Rural settlement: Rusanovsky Selsoviet Rural Settlement
- Time zone: UTC+3 (MSK)
- Postal code: 307119
- Dialing code: +7 47144
- OKTMO ID: 38644464151
- Website: морусановский.рф

Portina (Russian: Портина) is a rural locality (Russian: деревня, lit. 'village') in Rusanovsky Selsoviet Rural Settlement, Fatezhsky District, Kursk Oblast, Russia. The population as of 2010 is 20.

== Geography ==
The village is located on the Usozha River (a left tributary of the Svapa in the basin of the Seym) and its tributary, Ruda River, 97 km from the Russia–Ukraine border, 47.5 km north-west of Kursk, 6.5 km south-west of the district center – the town Fatezh, 5 km from the selsoviet center – Basovka.

=== Climate ===
Portina has a warm-summer humid continental climate (Dfb in the Köppen climate classification).

== Transport ==
Portina is located 4 km from the federal route M-2 Crimea Highway as part of the European route E105, 3.5 km from the road of regional importance 38K-038 (Fatezh – Dmitriyev), 1.5 km from the road of intermunicipal significance 38Н-679 (38K-038 – Soldatskoye – Shuklino), 29 km from the nearest railway halt 29 km (railway line Arbuzovo – Luzhki-Orlovskiye).

The rural locality is situated 51 km from Kursk Vostochny Airport, 168 km from Belgorod International Airport and 240 km from Voronezh Peter the Great Airport.
