= Novaya Zhizn, Fatezhsky District, Kursk Oblast =

Rural locality in Kursk Oblast, Russia

Novaya Zhizn Новая Жизнь
- Khutor
- Interactive map of Novaya Zhizn
- Location of Novaya Zhizn Novaya Zhizn (Kursk Oblast)
- Coordinates: 51°58′57″N 35°42′25″E
- Country: Russia
- Federal subject: Kursk Oblast
- Administrative district: Fatezhsky District
- SelsovietSelsoviet: Soldatsky

Population (2010 Census)
  - Total: 11
  - Estimate (2010): 11 (0%)

Municipal status
  - Municipal district: Fatezhsky Municipal District
  - Rural settlement: Soldatsky Selsoviet Rural Settlement
- Time zone: UTC+3 (MSK)
- Postal code: 307111
- Dialing code: +7 47144
- OKTMO ID: 38644468216
- Website: мосолдатский.рф

Novaya Zhizn (Russian: Новая Жизнь) is a rural locality (a khutor) in Soldatsky Selsoviet Rural Settlement, Fatezhsky District, Kursk Oblast, Russia. The population as of 2010 is 11.

== Geography ==
The khutor is located on the Ruda River (a link tributary of the Usozha in the basin of the Svapa) and its tributary, Gryaznaya Rudka, 90 km from the Russia–Ukraine border, 43 km north-west of Kursk, 14 km south-west of the district center – the town Fatezh, 10 km from the selsoviet center – Soldatskoye.

=== Climate ===
Novaya Zhizn has a warm-summer humid continental climate (Dfb in the Köppen climate classification).

== Transport ==
Novaya Zhizn is located 14 km from the federal route M-2 Crimea Highway as part of the European route E105, 13 km from the road of regional importance 38K-038 (Fatezh – Dmitriyev), 2 km from the road of intermunicipal significance 38Н-679 (38K-038 – Soldatskoye – Shuklino), 28.5 km from the nearest railway halt 552 km (railway line Navlya – Lgov-Kiyevsky).

The rural locality is situated 47 km from Kursk Vostochny Airport, 160 km from Belgorod International Airport and 243 km from Voronezh Peter the Great Airport.
