= Pozdnyakovo, Kursk Oblast =

Rural locality in Kursk Oblast, Russia

Pozdnyakovo Поздняково
- Village
- Interactive map of Pozdnyakovo
- Location of Pozdnyakovo Pozdnyakovo (Kursk Oblast)
- Coordinates: 51°57′18″N 35°38′33″E
- Country: Russia
- Federal subject: Kursk Oblast
- Administrative district: Fatezhsky District
- SelsovietSelsoviet: Soldatsky
- Elevation: 224 m (735 ft)

Population (2010 Census)
  - Total: 153
  - Estimate (2010): 153 (0%)

Municipal status
  - Municipal district: Fatezhsky Municipal District
  - Rural settlement: Soldatsky Selsoviet Rural Settlement
- Time zone: UTC+3 (MSK)
- Postal code: 307112
- Dialing code: +7 47144
- OKTMO ID: 38644468276
- Website: мосолдатский.рф

Pozdnyakovo (Russian: Поздняково) is a rural locality (Russian: деревня, lit. 'village') in Soldatsky Selsoviet Rural Settlement, Fatezhsky District, Kursk Oblast, Russia. The population as of 2010 is 153.

== Geography ==
The village is located on the Ruda River (a link tributary of the Usozha in the basin of the Svapa) and its tributary, Orekhovsky Brook, 86 km from the Russia–Ukraine border, 45 km north-west of Kursk, 20 km south-west of the district center – the town Fatezh, 15 km from the selsoviet center – Soldatskoye.

=== Climate ===
Pozdnyakovo has a warm-summer humid continental climate (Dfb in the Köppen climate classification).

== Transport ==
Pozdnyakovo is located 18 km from the federal route M-2 Crimea Highway as part of the European route E105, 16 km from the road of regional importance 38K-038 (Fatezh – Dmitriyev), on the road of intermunicipal significance 38Н-679 (38K-038 – Soldatskoye – Shuklino), 24 km from the nearest railway halt 552 km (railway line Navlya – Lgov-Kiyevsky).

The rural locality is situated 49 km from Kursk Vostochny Airport, 158 km from Belgorod International Airport and 247 km from Voronezh Peter the Great Airport.
