= Bunino, Fatezhsky District, Kursk Oblast =

Rural locality in Kursk Oblast, Russia

Bunino Бунино
- Village
- Interactive map of Bunino
- Location of Bunino Bunino (Kursk Oblast)
- Coordinates: 51°55′13″N 35°38′41″E
- Country: Russia
- Federal subject: Kursk Oblast
- Administrative district: Fatezhsky District
- SelsovietSelsoviet: Soldatsky
- Elevation: 220 m (720 ft)

Population (2010 Census)
  - Total: 25
  - Estimate (2010): 25 (0%)

Municipal status
  - Municipal district: Fatezhsky Municipal District
  - Rural settlement: Soldatsky Selsoviet Rural Settlement
- Time zone: UTC+3 (MSK)
- Postal code: 307112
- Dialing code: +7 47144
- OKTMO ID: 38644468281
- Website: мосолдатский.рф

Bunino (Russian: Бунино) is a rural locality (Russian: деревня, lit. 'village') in Soldatsky Selsoviet Rural Settlement, Fatezhsky District, Kursk Oblast, Russia. Population: 25 (2010 census); 69 (2002 census); 120 (1989 Soviet census).

== Geography ==
The village is located on the Orekhovsky Brook (a right tributary of the Ruda in the basin of the Svapa), 85 km from the Russia–Ukraine border, 42 km north-west of Kursk, 22 km south-west of the district center – the town Fatezh, 18 km from the selsoviet center – Soldatskoye.

Climate

Bunino has a warm-summer humid continental climate (Dfb in the Köppen climate classification).

== Transport ==
Bunino is located 20.5 km from the federal route M-2 Crimea Highway as part of the European route E105, 19.5 km from the road of regional importance 38K-038 (Fatezh – Dmitriyev), 3 km from the road of intermunicipal significance 38Н-679 (38K-038 – Soldatskoye – Shuklino), 23 km from the nearest railway halt 552 km (railway line Navlya – Lgov-Kiyevsky).

The rural locality is situated 48 km from Kursk Vostochny Airport, 155 km from Belgorod International Airport and 247 km from Voronezh Peter the Great Airport.
