= Lyubimovka, Fatezhsky District, Kursk Oblast =

Rural locality in Kursk Oblast, Russia

Lyubimovka Любимовка
- Village
- Interactive map of Lyubimovka
- Location of Lyubimovka Lyubimovka (Kursk Oblast)
- Coordinates: 52°00′54″N 35°42′58″E
- Country: Russia
- Federal subject: Kursk Oblast
- Administrative district: Fatezhsky District
- SelsovietSelsoviet: Soldatsky
- Elevation: 172 m (564 ft)

Population (2010 Census)
  - Total: 41
  - Estimate (2010): 41 (0%)

Municipal status
  - Municipal district: Fatezhsky Municipal District
  - Rural settlement: Soldatsky Selsoviet Rural Settlement
- Time zone: UTC+3 (MSK)
- Postal code: 307111
- Dialing code: +7 47144
- OKTMO ID: 38644468246
- Website: мосолдатский.рф

Lyubimovka (Russian: Любимовка) is a rural locality (Russian: деревня, lit. 'village') in Soldatsky Selsoviet Rural Settlement, Fatezhsky District, Kursk Oblast, Russia. The population as of 2010 is 41.

== Geography ==
The village is located on the Ruda River (a link tributary of the Usozha in the basin of the Svapa), 92 km from the Russia–Ukraine border, 44 km north-west of Kursk, 12 km south-west of the district center – the town Fatezh, 7 km from the selsoviet center – Soldatskoye.

=== Climate ===
Lyubimovka has a warm-summer humid continental climate (Dfb in the Köppen climate classification).

== Transport ==
Lyubimovka is located 10.5 km from the federal route M-2 Crimea Highway as part of the European route E105, 9 km from the road of regional importance 38K-038 (Fatezh – Dmitriyev), 0.6 km from the road of intermunicipal significance 38Н-679 (38K-038 – Soldatskoye – Shuklino), on the road 38Н-680 (38N-679 – Alisovo), 30.5 km from the nearest railway halt 552 km (railway line Navlya – Lgov-Kiyevsky).

The rural locality is situated 48 km from Kursk Vostochny Airport, 162 km from Belgorod International Airport and 243 km from Voronezh Peter the Great Airport.
