= Kosilovka =

Rural locality in Kursk Oblast, Russia

Kosilovka Косиловка
- Settlement
- Interactive map of Kosilovka
- Location of Kosilovka Kosilovka (Kursk Oblast)
- Coordinates: 52°05′12″N 35°44′21″E
- Country: Russia
- Federal subject: Kursk Oblast
- Administrative district: Fatezhsky District
- SelsovietSelsoviet: Soldatsky

Population (2010 Census)
  - Total: 34
  - Estimate (2010): 34 (0%)

Municipal status
  - Municipal district: Fatezhsky Municipal District
  - Rural settlement: Soldatsky Selsoviet Rural Settlement
- Time zone: UTC+3 (MSK)
- Postal code: 307106
- Dialing code: +7 47144
- OKTMO ID: 38644468116
- Website: мосолдатский.рф

Kosilovka (Russian: Косиловка) is a rural locality (a settlement) in Soldatsky Selsoviet Rural Settlement, Fatezhsky District, Kursk Oblast, Russia. Population: 34 (2010 census); 42 (2002 census); 50 (1989 Soviet census).

== Geography ==
The settlement is located on the Usozha River (a left tributary of the Svapa in the basin of the Seym), 96 km from the Russia–Ukraine border, 48 km north-west of Kursk, 8 km west of the district center – the town Fatezh, 1 km from the selsoviet center – Soldatskoye.

Climate

Kosilovka has a warm-summer humid continental climate (Dfb in the Köppen climate classification).

== Transport ==
Kosilovka is located 5 km from the federal route M-2 Crimea Highway as part of the European route E105, 2 km from the road of regional importance 38K-038 (Fatezh – Dmitriyev), on the road of intermunicipal significance 38Н-679 (38K-038 – Soldatskoye – Shuklino), 27.5 km from the nearest railway halt 29 km (railway line Arbuzovo – Luzhki-Orlovskiye).

The rural locality is situated 52 km from Kursk Vostochny Airport, 169 km from Belgorod International Airport and 241 km from Voronezh Peter the Great Airport.
