= Reprinka =

Rural locality in Kursk Oblast, Russia

Reprinka Репринка
- Village
- Interactive map of Reprinka
- Location of Reprinka Reprinka (Kursk Oblast)
- Coordinates: 52°01′05″N 35°44′06″E
- Country: Russia
- Federal subject: Kursk Oblast
- Administrative district: Fatezhsky District
- SelsovietSelsoviet: Soldatsky

Population (2010 Census)
  - Total: 9
  - Estimate (2010): 9 (0%)

Municipal status
  - Municipal district: Fatezhsky Municipal District
  - Rural settlement: Soldatsky Selsoviet Rural Settlement
- Time zone: UTC+3 (MSK)
- Postal code: 307111
- Dialing code: +7 47144
- OKTMO ID: 38644468236
- Website: мосолдатский.рф

Reprinka (Russian: Репринка) is a rural locality (Russian: деревня, lit. 'village') in Soldatsky Selsoviet Rural Settlement, Fatezhsky District, Kursk Oblast, Russia. The population as of 2010 is 9.

== Geography ==
The village is located on the Ruda River (a link tributary of the Usozha in the basin of the Svapa) and its tributary, Zhuravchik, 94 km from the Russia–Ukraine border, 44 km north-west of Kursk, 11 km south-west of the district center – the town Fatezh, 6.5 km from the selsoviet center – Soldatskoye.

=== Climate ===
Reprinka has a warm-summer humid continental climate (Dfb in the Köppen climate classification).

== Transport ==
Reprinka is located 9 km from the federal route M-2 Crimea Highway as part of the European route E105, 9 km from the road of regional importance 38K-038 (Fatezh – Dmitriyev), 2 km from the road of intermunicipal significance 38Н-679 (38K-038 – Soldatskoye – Shuklino), 31.5 km from the nearest railway halt 29 km (railway line Arbuzovo – Luzhki-Orlovskiye).

The rural locality is situated 48 km from Kursk Vostochny Airport, 162 km from Belgorod International Airport and 241 km from Voronezh Peter the Great Airport.
