= Bolonino =

Rural locality in Kursk Oblast, Russia

Bolonino Болонино
- Village
- Interactive map of Bolonino
- Location of Bolonino Bolonino (Kursk Oblast)
- Coordinates: 52°03′52″N 35°42′13″E
- Country: Russia
- Federal subject: Kursk Oblast
- Administrative district: Fatezhsky District
- SelsovietSelsoviet: Soldatsky
- Elevation: 163 m (535 ft)

Population (2010 Census)
  - Total: 12
  - Estimate (2010): 12 (0%)

Municipal status
  - Municipal district: Fatezhsky Municipal District
  - Rural settlement: Soldatsky Selsoviet Rural Settlement
- Time zone: UTC+3 (MSK)
- Postal code: 307106
- Dialing code: +7 47144
- OKTMO ID: 38644468106
- Website: мосолдатский.рф

Bolonino (Russian: Болонино) is a rural locality (Russian: деревня, lit. 'village') in Soldatsky Selsoviet Rural Settlement, Fatezhsky District, Kursk Oblast, Russia.

== Geography ==
The village is located on the Usozha River (a left tributary of the Svapa in the basin of the Seym), 93 km from the Russia–Ukraine border, 49 km north-west of Kursk, 10 km south-west of the district center – the town Fatezh, 2.5 km from the selsoviet center – Soldatskoye.

== Climate and population ==
Bolonino has a warm-summer humid continental climate (Dfb in the Köppen climate classification).

Population: 12 (2010 census); 22 (2002 census); 40 (1989 Soviet census).

== Transport ==
Bolonino is located 8 km from the federal route M-2 Crimea Highway as part of the European route E105, 4 km from the road of regional importance 38K-038 (Fatezh – Dmitriyev), 1 km from the road of intermunicipal significance 38Н-679 (38K-038 – Soldatskoye – Shuklino), 26.5 km from the nearest railway halt 29 km (railway line Arbuzovo – Luzhki-Orlovskiye).

The rural locality is situated 53 km from Kursk Vostochny Airport, 168 km from Belgorod International Airport and 244 km from Voronezh Peter the Great Airport.
