= Cheryakino =

Rural locality in Kursk Oblast, Russia

Cheryakino Черякино
- Khutor
- Interactive map of Cheryakino
- Location of Cheryakino Cheryakino (Kursk Oblast)
- Coordinates: 52°04′12″N 35°45′07″E
- Country: Russia
- Federal subject: Kursk Oblast
- Administrative district: Fatezhsky District
- SelsovietSelsoviet: Soldatsky

Population (2010 Census)
  - Total: 67
  - Estimate (2010): 67 (0%)

Municipal status
  - Municipal district: Fatezhsky Municipal District
  - Rural settlement: Soldatsky Selsoviet Rural Settlement
- Time zone: UTC+3 (MSK)
- Postal code: 307106
- Dialing code: +7 47144
- OKTMO ID: 38644468146
- Website: мосолдатский.рф

Cheryakino (Russian: Черякино) is a rural locality (a khutor) in Soldatsky Selsoviet Rural Settlement, Fatezhsky District, Kursk Oblast, Russia. Population: 67 (2010 census); 62 (2002 census); 79 (1989 Soviet census).

== Geography ==
The khutor is located on the Ruda River (a link tributary of the Usozha in the basin of the Svapa), 97 km from the Russia–Ukraine border, 47 km north-west of Kursk, 6.5 km west of the district center – the town Fatezh, 1 km from the selsoviet center – Soldatskoye.

Climate

Cheryakino has a warm-summer humid continental climate (Dfb in the Köppen climate classification).

== Transport ==
Cheryakino is located 5 km from the federal route M-2 Crimea Highway as part of the European route E105, 4 km from the road of regional importance 38K-038 (Fatezh – Dmitriyev), 0.5 km from the road of intermunicipal significance 38Н-679 (38K-038 – Soldatskoye – Shuklino), 29 km from the nearest railway halt 29 km (railway line Arbuzovo – Luzhki-Orlovskiye).

The rural locality is situated 50 km from Kursk Vostochny Airport, 168 km from Belgorod International Airport and 240 km from Voronezh Peter the Great Airport.
