= Zavidny =

Zavidny, Zavidnyi, etc. (Russian: Завидный) may refer to:

- Russian destroyer Zavidny, 1903
- Zavidny, Kursk Oblast, rural locality, Russia
