= Solovyovka, Fatezhsky District, Kursk Oblast =

Rural locality in Kursk Oblast, Russia

Solovyovka Соловьёвка
- Khutor
- Interactive map of Solovyovka
- Location of Solovyovka Solovyovka (Kursk Oblast)
- Coordinates: 52°04′36″N 35°42′56″E
- Country: Russia
- Federal subject: Kursk Oblast
- Administrative district: Fatezhsky District
- SelsovietSelsoviet: Soldatsky

Population (2010 Census)
  - Total: 3
  - Estimate (2010): 3 (0%)

Municipal status
  - Municipal district: Fatezhsky Municipal District
  - Rural settlement: Soldatsky Selsoviet Rural Settlement
- Time zone: UTC+3 (MSK)
- Postal code: 307106
- Dialing code: +7 47144
- OKTMO ID: 38644468136
- Website: мосолдатский.рф

Solovyovka (Russian: Соловьёвка) is a rural locality (a khutor) in Soldatsky Selsoviet Rural Settlement, Fatezhsky District, Kursk Oblast, Russia. Population: 3 (2010 census); 7 (2002 census); 16 (1989 Soviet census).

== Geography ==
The khutor is located on the Usozha River (a left tributary of the Svapa in the basin of the Seym), 94 km from the Russia–Ukraine border, 50 km north-west of Kursk, 10 km west of the district center – the town Fatezh, 1.5 km from the selsoviet center – Soldatskoye.

Climate

Solovyovka has a warm-summer humid continental climate (Dfb in the Köppen climate classification).

== Transport ==
Solovyovka is located 7 km from the federal route M-2 Crimea Highway as part of the European route E105, 3 km from the road of regional importance 38K-038 (Fatezh – Dmitriyev), 1 km from the road of intermunicipal significance 38Н-679 (38K-038 – Soldatskoye – Shuklino), 26.5 km from the nearest railway halt 29 km (railway line Arbuzovo – Luzhki-Orlovskiye).

The rural locality is situated 53 km from Kursk Vostochny Airport, 169 km from Belgorod International Airport and 243 km from Voronezh Peter the Great Airport.
