= Liubymivka =

Liubymivka may refer to the following places in Ukraine:

- Liubymivka, Beryslav Raion, Kherson Oblast, a village in Beryslav Raion of Kherson Oblast
- Liubymivka, Henichesk Raion, Kherson Oblast, a village in Henichesk Raion of Kherson Oblast
- Liubymivka, Kakhovka Raion, Kherson Oblast, a rural settlement in Kakhovka Raion of Kherson Oblast
- Liubymivka, Rovenky Raion, Luhansk Oblast, previously known as Dzerzhynskyi, a rural settlement in Luhansk Oblast
- Liubymivka, Zaporizhzhia Oblast, a village in Polohy Raion of Zaporizhzhia Oblast

== See also ==
- Lyubimovka (disambiguation)
