= Verkhniye Khalchi =

Rural locality in Kursk Oblast, Russia

Verkhniye Khalchi Верхние Халчи
- Selo
- Interactive map of Verkhniye Khalchi
- Location of Verkhniye Khalchi Verkhniye Khalchi (Kursk Oblast)
- Coordinates: 51°59′53″N 35°37′21″E
- Country: Russia
- Federal subject: Kursk Oblast
- Administrative district: Fatezhsky District
- SelsovietSelsoviet: Soldatsky

Population (2010 Census)
  - Total: 126
  - Estimate (2010): 126 (0%)

Municipal status
  - Municipal district: Fatezhsky Municipal District
  - Rural settlement: Soldatsky Selsoviet Rural Settlement
- Time zone: UTC+3 (MSK)
- Postal code: 307105
- Dialing code: +7 47144
- OKTMO ID: 38644468256
- Website: мосолдатский.рф

Verkhniye Khalchi (Russian: Верхние Халчи) is a rural locality (Russian: село, lit. 'village') in Soldatsky Selsoviet Rural Settlement, Fatezhsky District, Kursk Oblast, Russia. Population: 126 (2010 census); 197 (2002 census); 251 (1989 Soviet census).

== Geography ==
The village is located on the Khalchi River (a link tributary of the Usozha in the basin of the Svapa), 85 km from the Russia–Ukraine border, 48 km north-west of Kursk, 16 km south-west of the district center – the town Fatezh, 11 km from the selsoviet center – Soldatskoye.

Climate

Verkhniye Khalchi has a warm-summer humid continental climate (Dfb in the Köppen climate classification).

Climate data for Verkhniye Khalchi
Month	Jan	Feb	Mar	Apr	May	Jun	Jul	Aug	Sep	Oct	Nov	Dec	Year
Mean daily maximum °C (°F)	−4.2 (24.4)	−3.3 (26.1)	2.4 (36.3)	12.7 (54.9)	19 (66)	22.3 (72.1)	24.9 (76.8)	24.2 (75.6)	17.8 (64.0)	10.2 (50.4)	3.2 (37.8)	−1.3 (29.7)	10.7 (51.2)
Daily mean °C (°F)	−6.2 (20.8)	−5.7 (21.7)	−1 (30)	8 (46)	14.4 (57.9)	18.1 (64.6)	20.6 (69.1)	19.7 (67.5)	13.7 (56.7)	7 (45)	1 (34)	−3.2 (26.2)	7.2 (45.0)
Mean daily minimum °C (°F)	−8.6 (16.5)	−8.7 (16.3)	−4.9 (23.2)	2.6 (36.7)	9 (48)	12.9 (55.2)	15.7 (60.3)	14.7 (58.5)	9.6 (49.3)	3.9 (39.0)	−1.2 (29.8)	−5.4 (22.3)	3.3 (37.9)
Average precipitation mm (inches)	51 (2.0)	45 (1.8)	47 (1.9)	51 (2.0)	62 (2.4)	72 (2.8)	78 (3.1)	56 (2.2)	59 (2.3)	58 (2.3)	48 (1.9)	50 (2.0)	677 (26.7)
Source: https://en.climate-data.org/asia/russian-federation/kursk-oblast/верхние-халчи-687152/

== Transport ==
Verkhniye Khalchi is located 16 km from the federal route M-2 Crimea Highway as part of the European route E105, 11 km from the road of regional importance 38K-038 (Fatezh – Dmitriyev), 2.5 km from the road of intermunicipal significance 38Н-679 (38K-038 – Soldatskoye – Shuklino), on the road 38Н-681 (38N-679 – Verkhniye Khalchi), 25 km from the nearest railway halt 552 km (railway line Navlya – Lgov-Kiyevsky).

The rural locality is situated 52 km from Kursk Vostochny Airport, 163 km from Belgorod International Airport and 248 km from Voronezh Peter the Great Airport.
