= Solovyovka (Novosibirsk Oblast) =

Village in Russia

Solovyovka Соловьёвка
- Location within Novosibirsk Oblast Location within Russia
- Coordinates: 53°56′13″N 77°21′58″E
- Country: Russia
- Region: Novosibirsk Oblast
- District: Bagansky District
- Village Council: Kazansky Village Council
- Time zone: UTC+7:00
- Postcode: 632778

Solovyovka (Russian: Соловьёвка) is a rural locality (a selo). It is part of the Kazansky village council of Bagansky district, Novosibirsk Oblast, Russia.

Population 254 (2010 census); and 315 (2002 census); .
