= Lyubimovka, Bashkortostan =

Village in Askinsky District, Bashkortostan, Russia

Lyubimovka Любимовка
- Village
- Location within Bashkortostan Location within Russia
- Coordinates: 56°05′N 56°30′E
- Country: Russia
- Region: Bashkortostan
- District: Askinsky District
- Time zone: UTC+5:00

Lyubimovka (Russian: Любимовка) is a rural locality (a village) in Petropavlovsky Selsoviet, Askinsky District, Bashkortostan, Russia. The population was 19 as of 2010. There are 2 streets.

== Geography ==
Lyubimovka is located 5 km west of Askino (the district's administrative centre) by road. Askino is the nearest rural locality.
