= Lyubimovka (festival) =

Russian drama festival

Lyubimovka Независимый фестиваль драматургии «Любимовка»
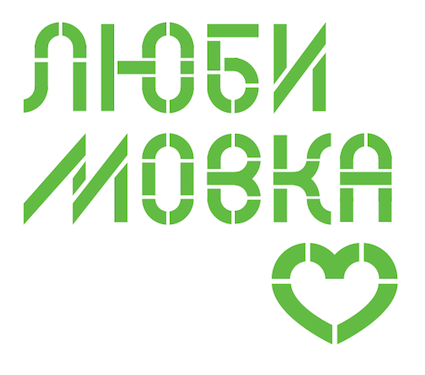
- Festival logo
- Status: Active
- Genre: Contemporary drama; theatre
- Frequency: Annual
- Locations: Teatr.doc (until 2022); independent venues
- Years active: 1990–present
- Inaugurated: 1990
- Founders: Mikhail Roshchin, Alexei Kazantsev, Viktor Slavkin and others
- Website: lubimovka.art

Lyubimovka (Russian: Независимый фестиваль драматургии «Любимовка») is an independent drama festival in Russia. Sources describe it as the country's oldest drama festival. It was previously known as the Lyubimovka Young Playwrights' Festival.

== History ==
=== 1990–2006 ===
The festival was founded in 1990 by the dramatists and critics Mikhail Roshchin, Alexei Kazantsev, Viktor Slavkin, Vladimir Gurkin, Yuri Rybakov, Inna Gromova, Margarita Svetlakova, Maria Medvedeva and others. It was conceived as a laboratory in which young authors could present their texts to the professional community.

From 1995 to 2000, the organising committee included the dramatists Elena Gremina, Mikhail Ugarov, Elena Isaeva, Olga Mikhailova, Maksim Kurochkin and Ksenia Dragunskaya. In 2000, Alexander Rodionov became the festival's director.

Until 2001, the festival was held at the historic Lyubimovka estate of Konstantin Stanislavski, and later in Moscow.

=== 2007–2012 ===
From 2007, the festival was held at Teatr.doc. A new artistic directorate included the theatre critics Elena Kovalskaya and Kristina Matvienko and the playwrights Alexander Rodionov and Mikhail Ugarov. Works presented during these years included Natashina mechta by Yaroslava Pulinovich, Kedy by Lyubov Strizhak, Kontslageristy by Valery Shergin, Eksponaty by Vyacheslav Durnenkov, Chas 18 by Elena Gremina, Kasting by German Grekov, Lyogkie lyudi by Mikhail Durnenkov and Sokoly by Valery Pecheykin.

=== 2013–2019 ===
In 2013, the festival's artistic direction was taken over by the playwrights Mikhail Durnenkov and Evgeny Kazachkov and the theatre scholar Anna Banasyukevich. During their tenure the programme expanded substantially: it added the experimental fringe programme, a non-competition programme for established playwrights, the LARK and Praktika post-dramaturga laboratories, and educational programmes with theatre professionals from around the world.

=== 2019–2024 ===
On 9 September 2019, the festival announced another change in artistic direction. The new generation of organisers included the playwrights Nina Belenitskaya, Ekaterina Bondarenko, Polina Borodina, Olzhas Zhanaydarov, Andrei Ivanov and Maria Ogneva, together with the theatre scholar Polina Pkhor and the director Yuri Shekhvatov.

=== 2024–present ===
In 2024, another change in artistic direction was announced. The new artistic directorate included the playwrights Natalia Lizorkina and Zukhra Yanikova, the director Anastasia Patlay and the theatre researcher Elena Gordienko.

In 2022, the festival became international and began taking place at independent venues around the world.

== Festival projects ==
=== Festival production project ===
The festival's production project supports stage productions based on plays that have appeared in the programme. Productions have included:

- 28 Days, written by Olga Shilyaeva and directed by Yuri Muravitsky and Svetlana Mikhalishcheva at Teatr.doc.
- Pro linya, written by Aleksandr Kargin and directed by Aleksandr Kudryashov at the 8/3 venue.
- S uchilishcha, written by Andrei Ivanov and directed by Semyon Serzin at the Pushkin Moscow Drama Theatre.
- The Hand of God, written by Robert Askins in an adaptation by Valery Pecheykin and directed by Yuri Muravitsky at Teatr.doc.
- Mama, written by Asya Voloshina and directed by Yuri Shekhvatov at the 8/3 venue.

=== Praktika post-dramaturga ===
In 2018 and 2019, the festival, together with Praktika Theatre and the Union of Theatre Workers of Russia, ran the year-long creative laboratory Praktika post-dramaturga. Participants included Ekaterina Avgustenyak, Ksenia Galyga, Gulnara Garipova, Mikhail Degtyaryov, Olzhas Zhanaydarov, Andrei Zhiganov, Viktoriya Kostyukevich, Mikhail Levin, Serafima Orlova, Ksenia Savelieva and Yevgeny Stashkov.

=== LARK+Lyubimovka ===
Together with the LARK play development centre in New York, the festival has run an annual creative-exchange programme between the United States and Russia. Texts by playwrights from both countries are translated, adapted and presented on stage. Participants in the laboratory have included Arthur Kopit, Rinat Tashimov, Yulia Tupikina, Erik Dufault and Dominique Morisseau.

== Influence on theatre ==
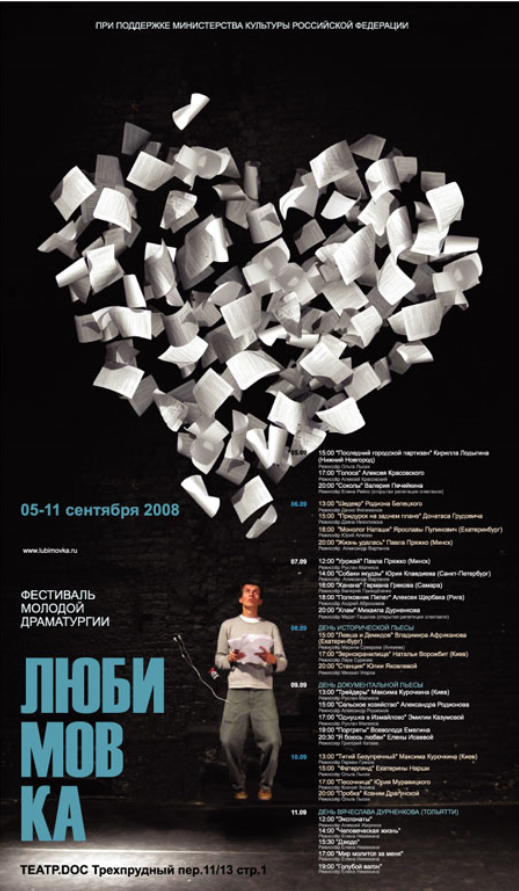
Festival poster in 2008

Critics and scholars have described Lyubimovka as playing a distinctive role in contemporary Russian theatre. According to these sources, the festival introduces new authors each year, integrates them into the theatrical process and creates a space for the exchange of experience. It has also been described as a venue that brings new names to theatre, media, cinema and contemporary art beyond conventional boundaries.

Elena Smorodinova wrote in Russian Reporter that the auditorium at Teatr.doc filled to capacity every year and that "practically all of today's well-known authors" had some connection to Lyubimovka.

In different years the festival gave first presentations to texts by Mikhail Ugarov, Yaroslava Pulinovich, Ivan Vyrypaev, Nikolai Kolyada, Vasily Sigarev, Yevgeny Grishkovets, Ksenia Dragunskaya, Boris Khlebnikov, Sergei Davydov, Maria Arbatova, Oleg Shishkin, Alexander Rodionov, Vyacheslav and Mikhail Durnenkov, Yuri Klavdiyev, Alexei Slapovsky, Dmitry Danilov, Lyubov Mulmenko and Valery Pecheykin, among others.
