= Solovyovka (Bashkortostan) =

Solovyovka Соловьёвка
- Village
- Location within Bashkortostan Location within Russia
- Coordinates: 53°52′N 55°55′E
- Country: Russia
- Region: Bashkortostan
- District: Sterlitamaksky District
- Time zone: UTC+5:00

Solovyovka (Russian: Соловьёвка) is a rural locality (a village) in Podlesnensky Selsoviet, Sterlitamaksky District, Bashkortostan, Russia. The population was 12 as of 2010. There is 1 street.

== Geography ==
Solovyovka is located 50 km north of Sterlitamak (the district's administrative centre) by road. Staromakarovo is the nearest rural locality.
