= Alisovo, Kursk Oblast =

Rural locality in Kursk Oblast, Russia

Alisovo Алисово
- Village
- Interactive map of Alisovo
- Location of Alisovo Alisovo (Kursk Oblast)
- Coordinates: 51°59′13″N 35°44′23″E
- Country: Russia
- Federal subject: Kursk Oblast
- Administrative district: Fatezhsky District
- SelsovietSelsoviet: Soldatsky

Population (2010 Census)
  - Total: 39
  - Estimate (2010): 39 (0%)

Municipal status
  - Municipal district: Fatezhsky Municipal District
  - Rural settlement: Soldatsky Selsoviet Rural Settlement
- Time zone: UTC+3 (MSK)
- Postal code: 307111
- Dialing code: +7 47144
- OKTMO ID: 38644468166
- Website: мосолдатский.рф

Alisovo (Russian: Алисово) is a rural locality (Russian: деревня, lit. 'village') in Soldatsky Selsoviet Rural Settlement, Fatezhsky District, Kursk Oblast, Russia. Population: 39 (2010 census); 62 (2002 census); 68 (1989 Soviet census).

== Geography ==
The village is located on the Nikovets River (a right tributary of the Ruda in the basin of the Svapa), 92 km from the Russia–Ukraine border, 41 km north-west of Kursk, 13 km south-west of the district center – the town Fatezh, 10 km from the selsoviet center – Soldatskoye.

Climate

Alisovo has a warm-summer humid continental climate (Dfb in the Köppen climate classification).

== Transport ==
Alisovo is located 12 km from the federal route M-2 Crimea Highway as part of the European route E105, 13 km from the road of regional importance 38K-038 (Fatezh – Dmitriyev), 3.5 km from the road of intermunicipal significance 38Н-679 (38K-038 – Soldatskoye – Shuklino), on the road 38Н-680 (38N-679 – Alisovo), 31 km from the nearest railway halt 552 km (railway line Navlya – Lgov-Kiyevsky).

The rural locality is situated 45 km from Kursk Vostochny Airport, 158 km from Belgorod International Airport and 241 km from Voronezh Peter the Great Airport.
