= Liubymivka, Henichesk Raion, Kherson Oblast =

Village in Kherson Oblast, Ukraine

Liubymivka Любимівка
- Village
- Interactive map of Liubymivka
- Location of Liubymivka in Kherson Oblast Liubymivka (Kherson Oblast)
- Coordinates: 46.555833°N 34.529722°E
- Country: Ukraine
- Oblast: Kherson Oblast
- Raion: Henichesk Raion
- Hromada: Ivanivka
- Founded: 1913

Area
  - Total: 35.733 km^{2} (13.797 sq mi)
- Elevation: 35 m (115 ft)

Population (2001 census)
  - Total: 880
  - Density: 25/km^{2} (64/sq mi)
- Time zone: UTC+2 (EET)
  - Summer (DST): UTC+3 (EEST)
- Postal code: 75443
- Area code: +380 5531
- KATOTTG: UA65040030110034404

Liubymivka (Ukrainian: Любимівка; Russian: Любимовка) is a village in Henichesk Raion (district) in Kherson Oblast of southern Ukraine, at about 145.91 kilometres (90.66 mi) east by south (EbS) of Kherson. It belongs to Ivanivka settlement hromada, one of the hromadas of Ukraine.

== History ==
The village was founded in 1914, along with several other settlements, each with the name Article 100. This was after the serial number of the plot of state land after the Stolypin reform. The Nezamozhennyk commune was established within the village limits in 1922. During the beginning of collectivization after occupation by the Soviet Union, three collective farms were established called "Red Ukraine", "Shevchenko", and "Red Giant". In 1939, these farms were united into a village. During the Great Patriotic War, the village was occupied by German troops from 17 September 1941 to 29 October 1943. The village was renamed in 1950 from Article 100 to Budenivka, which was reversed in 1962 to its current name, Liubymivka. In 1963, the collective farm was established as Yuzhnyi, later Pivdenne.

Until 18 July 2020, Liubymivka belonged to Ivanivka Raion. The raion was abolished in July 2020 as part of the administrative reform of Ukraine, which reduced the number of raions of Kherson Oblast to five. The area of Ivanivka Raion was merged into Henichesk Raion.

In December 2022, during the Russian occupation of the village, the appointed mayor by the Russians, Andrei Shtepa, was killed in a car bomb attack. He was burned to death during the attack.

== Demographics ==
The settlement had 880 inhabitants in 2001, native language distribution as of the Ukrainian Census of the same year:

- Ukrainian: 82.16%
- Russian: 10.34%
- Armenian: 2.05%
- Belarusian: 0.34%
- Romanian: 0.23%
- Moldovan (Romanian): 0.11%
- other languages: 4.77%
