= Kofanovka, Fatezhsky District, Kursk Oblast =

Rural locality in Kursk Oblast, Russia

Kofanovka Кофановка
- Village
- Interactive map of Kofanovka
- Location of Kofanovka Kofanovka (Kursk Oblast)
- Coordinates: 52°00′20″N 35°46′45″E
- Country: Russia
- Federal subject: Kursk Oblast
- Administrative district: Fatezhsky District
- SelsovietSelsoviet: Soldatsky

Population (2010 Census)
  - Total: 31
  - Estimate (2010): 31 (0%)

Municipal status
  - Municipal district: Fatezhsky Municipal District
  - Rural settlement: Soldatsky Selsoviet Rural Settlement
- Time zone: UTC+3 (MSK)
- Postal code: 307111
- Dialing code: +7 47144
- OKTMO ID: 38644468191
- Website: мосолдатский.рф

Kofanovka (Russian: Кофановка) is a rural locality (Russian: деревня, lit. 'village') in Soldatsky Selsoviet Rural Settlement, Fatezhsky District, Kursk Oblast, Russia. Population: 31 (2010 census); 47 (2002 census); 83 (1989 Soviet census).

== Geography ==
The village is located on the Zhuravchik River (a right tributary of the Ruda in the basin of the Svapa), 96 km from the Russia–Ukraine border, 41 km north-west of Kursk, 10 km south-west of the district center – the town Fatezh, 8.5 km from the selsoviet center – Soldatskoye.

Climate

Kofanovka has a warm-summer humid continental climate (Dfb in the Köppen climate classification).

== Transport ==
Kofanovka is located 8.5 km from the federal route M-2 Crimea Highway as part of the European route E105, 11 km from the road of regional importance 38K-038 (Fatezh – Dmitriyev), on the road of intermunicipal significance 38Н-826 (Alisovo-Pokrovskoye – Kofanovka), 34.5 km from the nearest railway halt 552 km (railway line Navlya – Lgov-Kiyevsky).

The rural locality is situated 44 km from Kursk Vostochny Airport, 160 km from Belgorod International Airport and 238 km from Voronezh Peter the Great Airport.
