= Alisovo-Pokrovskoye =

Rural locality in Kursk Oblast, Russia

Alisovo-Pokrovskoye Алисово-Покровское
- Selo
- Interactive map of Alisovo-Pokrovskoye
- Location of Alisovo-Pokrovskoye Alisovo-Pokrovskoye (Kursk Oblast)
- Coordinates: 51°58′43″N 35°45′28″E
- Country: Russia
- Federal subject: Kursk Oblast
- Administrative district: Fatezhsky District
- SelsovietSelsoviet: Soldatsky
- Elevation: 235 m (771 ft)

Population (2010 Census)
  - Total: 83
  - Estimate (2010): 83 (0%)

Municipal status
  - Municipal district: Fatezhsky Municipal District
  - Rural settlement: Soldatsky Selsoviet Rural Settlement
- Time zone: UTC+3 (MSK)
- Postal code: 307111
- Dialing code: +7 47144
- OKTMO ID: 38644468161
- Website: мосолдатский.рф

Alisovo-Pokrovskoye (Russian: Алисово-Покровское) is a rural locality (Russian: село, lit. 'village') in Soldatsky Selsoviet Rural Settlement, Fatezhsky District, Kursk Oblast, Russia. Population: 83 (2010 census); 89 (2002 census); 77 (1989 Soviet census).

== Geography ==
The village is located on the Nikovets River (a right tributary of the Ruda in the basin of the Svapa), 94 km from the Russia–Ukraine border, 40 km north-west of Kursk, 11 km south-west of the district center – the town Fatezh, 13 km from the selsoviet center – Soldatskoye.

Climate

Alisovo-Pokrovskoye has a warm-summer humid continental climate (Dfb in the Köppen climate classification).

== Transport ==
Alisovo-Pokrovskoye is located 11 km from the federal route M-2 Crimea Highway as part of the European route E105, 13.5 km from the road of regional importance 38K-038 (Fatezh – Dmitriyev), on the road of intermunicipal significance 38Н-826 (Alisovo-Pokrovskoye – Kofanovka), 32 km from the nearest railway halt 552 km (railway line Navlya – Lgov-Kiyevsky).

The rural locality is situated 44 km from Kursk Vostochny Airport, 158 km from Belgorod International Airport and 239 km from Voronezh Peter the Great Airport.
