= Shuklino, Kursk Oblast =

Rural locality in Kursk Oblast, Russia

Shuklino Шуклино
- Village
- Interactive map of Shuklino
- Location of Shuklino Shuklino (Kursk Oblast)
- Coordinates: 51°57′29″N 35°39′34″E
- Country: Russia
- Federal subject: Kursk Oblast
- Administrative district: Fatezhsky District
- SelsovietSelsoviet: Soldatsky
- Elevation: 235 m (771 ft)

Population (2010 Census)
  - Total: 50
  - Estimate (2010): 50 (0%)

Municipal status
  - Municipal district: Fatezhsky Municipal District
  - Rural settlement: Soldatsky Selsoviet Rural Settlement
- Time zone: UTC+3 (MSK)
- Postal code: 307112
- Dialing code: +7 47144
- OKTMO ID: 38644468301
- Website: мосолдатский.рф

Shuklino (Russian: Шуклино) is a rural locality (Russian: деревня, lit. 'village') in Soldatsky Selsoviet Rural Settlement, Fatezhsky District, Kursk Oblast, Russia. Population: 50 (2010 census); 68 (2002 census); 79 (1989 Soviet census).

== Geography ==
The village is located on the Ruda River (a link tributary of the Usozha in the basin of the Svapa), 87 km from the Russia–Ukraine border, 44 km north-west of Kursk, 19 km south-west of the district center – the town Fatezh, 14 km from the selsoviet center – Soldatskoye.

Climate

Shuklino has a warm-summer humid continental climate (Dfb in the Köppen climate classification).

Climate data for Shuklino
Month	Jan	Feb	Mar	Apr	May	Jun	Jul	Aug	Sep	Oct	Nov	Dec	Year
Mean daily maximum °C (°F)	−4.3 (24.3)	−3.4 (25.9)	2.4 (36.3)	12.7 (54.9)	19 (66)	22.3 (72.1)	24.9 (76.8)	24.2 (75.6)	17.8 (64.0)	10.2 (50.4)	3.1 (37.6)	−1.4 (29.5)	10.6 (51.1)
Daily mean °C (°F)	−6.3 (20.7)	−5.8 (21.6)	−1 (30)	8 (46)	14.5 (58.1)	18.1 (64.6)	20.7 (69.3)	19.7 (67.5)	13.7 (56.7)	7 (45)	1 (34)	−3.3 (26.1)	7.2 (45.0)
Mean daily minimum °C (°F)	−8.7 (16.3)	−8.7 (16.3)	−4.9 (23.2)	2.6 (36.7)	9 (48)	12.9 (55.2)	15.7 (60.3)	14.7 (58.5)	9.6 (49.3)	3.9 (39.0)	−1.3 (29.7)	−5.4 (22.3)	3.3 (37.9)
Average precipitation mm (inches)	52 (2.0)	45 (1.8)	47 (1.9)	51 (2.0)	62 (2.4)	73 (2.9)	77 (3.0)	57 (2.2)	60 (2.4)	60 (2.4)	48 (1.9)	50 (2.0)	682 (26.9)
Source: https://en.climate-data.org/asia/russian-federation/kursk-oblast/шуклино-687149/

== Transport ==
Shuklino is located 18 km from the federal route M-2 Crimea Highway as part of the European route E105, 16 km from the road of regional importance 38K-038 (Fatezh – Dmitriyev), 0.5 km from the road of intermunicipal significance 38Н-679 (38K-038 – Soldatskoye – Shuklino), 24.5 km from the nearest railway halt 552 km (railway line Navlya – Lgov-Kiyevsky).

The rural locality is situated 48.5 km from Kursk Vostochny Airport, 158 km from Belgorod International Airport and 246 km from Voronezh Peter the Great Airport.
