= Soldatskoye, Fatezhsky District, Kursk Oblast =

Rural locality in Kursk Oblast, Russia

Soldatskoye Солдатское
- Selo
- Interactive map of Soldatskoye
- Location of Soldatskoye Soldatskoye (Kursk Oblast)
- Coordinates: 52°04′29″N 35°44′13″E
- Country: Russia
- Federal subject: Kursk Oblast
- Administrative district: Fatezhsky District
- SelsovietSelsoviet: Soldatsky
- Elevation: 168 m (551 ft)

Population (2010 Census)
  - Total: 225
  - Estimate (2010): 225 (0%)

Administrative status
  - Capital of: Soldatsky Selsoviet

Municipal status
  - Municipal district: Fatezhsky Municipal District
  - Rural settlement: Soldatsky Selsoviet Rural Settlement
  - Capital of: Soldatsky Selsoviet Rural Settlement
- Time zone: UTC+3 (MSK)
- Postal code: 307106
- Dialing code: +7 47144
- OKTMO ID: 38644468101
- Website: мосолдатский.рф

Soldatskoye (Russian: Солдатское) is a rural locality (Russian: село, lit. 'village') and the administrative center of Soldatsky Selsoviet Rural Settlement, Fatezhsky District, Kursk Oblast, Russia. Population: 225 (2010 census); 241 (2002 census); 175 (1989 Soviet census).

== Geography ==
The village is located on the Usozha River (a left tributary of the Svapa in the basin of the Seym), 95 km from the Russia–Ukraine border, 49 km north-west of Kursk, 8 km west of the district center – the town Fatezh.

Climate

Soldatskoye has a warm-summer humid continental climate (Dfb in the Köppen climate classification).

Climate data for Soldatskoye
Month	Jan	Feb	Mar	Apr	May	Jun	Jul	Aug	Sep	Oct	Nov	Dec	Year
Mean daily maximum °C (°F)	−4.3 (24.3)	−3.4 (25.9)	2.3 (36.1)	12.7 (54.9)	19.1 (66.4)	22.3 (72.1)	25 (77)	24.2 (75.6)	17.8 (64.0)	10.2 (50.4)	3.1 (37.6)	−1.4 (29.5)	10.6 (51.2)
Daily mean °C (°F)	−6.4 (20.5)	−5.9 (21.4)	−1.1 (30.0)	7.9 (46.2)	14.5 (58.1)	18.1 (64.6)	20.7 (69.3)	19.7 (67.5)	13.8 (56.8)	7 (45)	0.9 (33.6)	−3.3 (26.1)	7.2 (44.9)
Mean daily minimum °C (°F)	−8.8 (16.2)	−8.8 (16.2)	−5.1 (22.8)	2.5 (36.5)	8.9 (48.0)	12.8 (55.0)	15.7 (60.3)	14.7 (58.5)	9.6 (49.3)	3.8 (38.8)	−1.3 (29.7)	−5.4 (22.3)	3.2 (37.8)
Average precipitation mm (inches)	52 (2.0)	45 (1.8)	47 (1.9)	51 (2.0)	62 (2.4)	73 (2.9)	77 (3.0)	57 (2.2)	60 (2.4)	60 (2.4)	48 (1.9)	50 (2.0)	682 (26.9)
Source: https://en.climate-data.org/asia/russian-federation/kursk-oblast/солдатское-687015/

== Transport ==
Soldatskoye is located 5 km from the federal route M-2 Crimea Highway as part of the European route E105, 2.5 km from the road of regional importance 38K-038 (Fatezh – Dmitriyev), on the road of intermunicipal significance 38Н-679 (38K-038 – Soldatskoye – Shuklino), 27 km from the nearest railway halt 29 km (railway line Arbuzovo – Luzhki-Orlovskiye).

The rural locality is situated 52 km from Kursk Vostochny Airport, 168 km from Belgorod International Airport and 242 km from Voronezh Peter the Great Airport.
