= List of rural localities in Jewish Autonomous Oblast =

Map of Russia with Jewish Autonomous Oblast highlighted

This is a list of rural localities in the Jewish Autonomous Oblast. The Jewish Autonomous Oblast (JAO; Russian: Евре́йская автоно́мная о́бласть, Yevreyskaya avtonomnaya oblast; Yiddish: ייִדישע אװטאָנאָמע געגנט, yidishe avtonome Gegnt) is a federal subject of Russia in the Russian Far East, bordering Khabarovsk Krai and Amur Oblast in Russia and Heilongjiang province in China. Its administrative center is the town of Birobidzhan. Article 65 of the Constitution of Russia provides that the JAO is Russia's only autonomous oblast.

== Birobidzhansky District ==
Rural localities in Birobidzhansky District:

- Aeroport
- Alexeyevka
- Birofeld
- Golovino
- Dimitrovo
- Dubovoye
- Kazanka
- Nayfeld
- Opytnoye Pole
- Petrovka
- Pronkino
- Ptichnik
- Russkaya Polyana
- Valdgeym
- Zhyolty Yar

== Leninsky District ==
Rural localities in Leninsky District:

- Babstovo
- Bashmak
- Bidzhan
- Churki
- Gornoye
- Dezhnyovo
- Kalinino
- Kirovo
- Kukelevo
- Kvashnino
- Leninskoye
- Nizhneleninskoye
- Novotroitskoye
- Novoye
- Oktyabrskoye
- Preobrazhenovka
- Stepnoye
- Tselinnoye
- Ungun
- Ventselevo
- Voskresenovka

== Obluchensky District ==
Rural localities in Obluchensky District:

- Abramovka
- Bashurovo
- Budukan
- Dvurechye
- Izvestkovy
- Kimkan
- Lagar-Aul
- Londoko
- Pashkovo
- Radde
- Rudnoye
- Semistochny
- Snarsky
- Solovyovka
- Sutara
- Trek
- Tyoplye Klyuchi
- Udarny

== Oktyabrsky District ==
Rural localities in Oktyabrsky District:

- Amurzet
- Blagoslovennoye
- Dobroye
- Ekaterino-Nikolskoye
- Nagibovo
- Ozyornoye
- Polevoye
- Puzino
- Rucheyki
- Sadovoye
- Samara
- Soyuznoye
- Stolbovoye

== Smidovichsky District ==
Rural localities in Smidovichsky District:

- Aur
- Belgorodskoye
- Danilovka
- Dezhnyovka
- Ikura
- Kamyshovka
- Klyuchevoye
- Nizhnespasskoye
- Ol
- Olgokhta
- Osinovka
- Partizanskoye
- Peschanoye
- Selo imeni Telmana
- Sotsgorodok
- Vladimirovka
- Volochayevka-1

== See also ==
- Lists of rural localities in Russia
