= Preobrazhenovka, Jewish Autonomous Oblast =

Preobrazhenovka Преображеновка
- Selo
- Location within Jewish Autonomous Oblast Location within Russia
- Coordinates: 48°04′N 131°54′E
- Country: Russia
- Region: Jewish Autonomous Oblast
- District: Leninsky District
- Time zone: UTC+10:00

Preobrazhenovka (Russian: Преображеновка) is a rural locality (a selo) in Leninsky District, Jewish Autonomous Oblast, Russia. Population: 343 (2010 census); 418 (2002 census); There are 12 streets in this selo.

== Geography ==
This rural locality is located 56 km from Leninskoye (the district's administrative centre), 110 km from Birobidzhan (capital of Jewish Autonomous Oblast) and 7,055 km from Moscow. Bidzhan is the nearest rural locality.
