= Partizanskoye, Jewish Autonomous Oblast =

Partizanskoye Партизанское
- Selo
- Location within Jewish Autonomous Oblast Location within Russia
- Coordinates: 48°24′N 133°10′E
- Country: Russia
- Region: Jewish Autonomous Oblast
- District: Smidovichsky District
- Time zone: UTC+10:00

Partizanskoye (Russian: Партизанское) is a rural locality (a selo) in Smidovichsky District, Jewish Autonomous Oblast, Russia. Population: 1,067 (2010 census); 1,017 (2002 census); There are 13 streets in this selo.

== Geography ==
This rural locality is located 47 km from Smidovich (the district's administrative centre), 116 km from Birobidzhan (capital of Jewish Autonomous Oblast) and 7,170 km from Moscow. Volochayevka-1 is the nearest rural locality.
