= Nizhnespasskoye =

Nizhnespasskoye Нижнеспасское
- Selo
- Location within Jewish Autonomous Oblast Location within Russia
- Coordinates: 48°26′N 134°31′E
- Country: Russia
- Region: Jewish Autonomous Oblast
- District: Smidovichsky District
- Time zone: UTC+10:00

Nizhnespasskoye (Russian: Нижнеспасское) is a rural locality (a selo) in Smidovichsky District, Jewish Autonomous Oblast, Russia. Population: 43 (2010 census); 29 (2002 census); There is 1 street in this selo.

== Geography ==
This rural locality is located 55 km from Smidovich (the district's administrative centre), 125 km from Birobidzhan (capital of Jewish Autonomous Oblast) and 7,195 km from Moscow. Kamyshovka is the nearest rural locality.
