= Pashkovo =

Pashkovo Пашково
- Selo
- Location within Jewish Autonomous Oblast Location within Russia
- Coordinates: 48°53′N 130°39′E
- Country: Russia
- Region: Jewish Autonomous Oblast
- District: Obluchensky District
- Time zone: UTC+10:00

Pashkovo (Russian: Пашково) is a rural locality (a selo) in Obluchensky District, Jewish Autonomous Oblast, Russia. Population: 668 (2010 census); 882 (2002 census); There are 14 streets in this selo.

== Geography ==
This rural locality is located 33 km from Obluchye (the district's administrative centre), 166 km from Birobidzhan (capital of Jewish Autonomous Oblast) and 6,845 km from Moscow. Sagibovo is the nearest rural locality.
