= Rucheyki, Jewish Autonomous Oblast =

Rucheyki Ручейки
- Selo
- Location within Jewish Autonomous Oblast Location within Russia
- Coordinates: 47°49′N 131°38′E
- Country: Russia
- Region: Jewish Autonomous Oblast
- District: Oktyabrsky District
- Time zone: UTC+10:00

Rucheyki (Russian: Ручейки) is a rural locality (a selo) in Oktyabrsky District, Jewish Autonomous Oblast, Russia. Population: 146 (2010 census); 249 (2002 census); There are 5 streets in this selo.

== Geography ==
This rural locality is located 43 km from Amurzet (the district's administrative centre), 144 km from Birobidzhan (capital of Jewish Autonomous Oblast) and 7,075 km from Moscow. Dobroye is the nearest rural locality.
