= Kimkan =

Kimkan Кимкан
- Selo
- Location within Jewish Autonomous Oblast Location within Russia
- Coordinates: 48°59′N 131°25′E
- Country: Russia
- Region: Jewish Autonomous Oblast
- District: Obluchensky District
- Time zone: UTC+10:00

Kimkan (Russian: Кимкан) is a rural locality (a selo) in Obluchensky District, Jewish Autonomous Oblast, Russia. Population: 62 (2010 census); 97 (2002 census); There are 5 streets in this selo.

== Geography ==
This rural locality is located 27 km from Obluchye (the district's administrative centre), 112 km from Birobidzhan (capital of Jewish Autonomous Oblast) and 6,886 km from Moscow. Snarsky is the nearest rural locality.
