= Kvashnino, Jewish Autonomous Oblast =

Kvashnino Квашнино
- Selo
- Location within Jewish Autonomous Oblast Location within Russia
- Coordinates: 47°46′N 132°07′E
- Country: Russia
- Region: Jewish Autonomous Oblast
- District: Leninsky District
- Time zone: UTC+10:00

Kvashnino (Russian: Квашнино) is a rural locality (a selo) in Leninsky District, Jewish Autonomous Oblast, Russia. Population: 238 (2010 census); 262 (2002 census); There are 6 streets in this selo.

== Geography ==
This rural locality is located 40 km from Leninskoye (the district's administrative centre), 127 km from Birobidzhan (capital of Jewish Autonomous Oblast) and 7,118 km from Moscow. Dezhnyovo is the nearest rural locality.
