= Radde (rural locality) =

Radde Радде
- Selo
- Location within Jewish Autonomous Oblast Location within Russia
- Coordinates: 48°35′N 130°36′E
- Country: Russia
- Region: Jewish Autonomous Oblast
- District: Obluchensky District
- Time zone: UTC+10:00

Radde (Russian: Радде) is a rural locality (a selo) in Obluchensky District, Jewish Autonomous Oblast, Russia. Population: 429 (2010 census); 563 (2002 census); There are 10 streets in this selo.

== Geography ==
This rural locality is located 57 km from Obluchye (the district's administrative centre), 172 km from Birobidzhan (capital of Jewish Autonomous Oblast) and 6,885 km from Moscow. Bashurovo is the nearest rural locality.
