= Ol, Jewish Autonomous Oblast =

Ol Оль
- Station
- Location within Jewish Autonomous Oblast Location within Russia
- Coordinates: 48°35′N 133°37′E
- Country: Russia
- Region: Jewish Autonomous Oblast
- District: Smidovichsky District
- Time zone: UTC+10:00

Ol (Russian: Оль) is a rural locality (a station) in Smidovichsky District, Jewish Autonomous Oblast, Russia. Population: 23 (2010 census); 37 (2002 census); There are 2 streets in this station.

== Geography ==
This rural locality is located 14 km from Smidovich (the district's administrative centre), 56 km from Birobidzhan (capital of Jewish Autonomous Oblast) and 7,105 km from Moscow. Belgorodskoye is the nearest rural locality.
