= Rudnoye, Jewish Autonomous Oblast =

Rudnoye Рудное
- Selo
- Location within Jewish Autonomous Oblast Location within Russia
- Coordinates: 48°24′N 131°10′E
- Country: Russia
- Region: Jewish Autonomous Oblast
- District: Obluchensky District
- Time zone: UTC+10:00

Rudnoye (Russian: Рудное) is a rural locality (a selo) in Obluchensky District, Jewish Autonomous Oblast, Russia. Population: 110 (2010 census); 169 (2002 census); There are 6 streets in this selo.

== Geography ==
This rural locality is located 35 km from Obluchye (the district's administrative centre), 104 km from Birobidzhan (capital of Jewish Autonomous Oblast) and 6,888 km from Moscow. Snarsky is the nearest rural locality.
