= Osinovka, Jewish Autonomous Oblast =

Osinovka Осиновка
- Selo
- Location within Jewish Autonomous Oblast Location within Russia
- Coordinates: 48°26′N 134°51′E
- Country: Russia
- Region: Jewish Autonomous Oblast
- District: Smidovichsky District
- Time zone: UTC+10:00

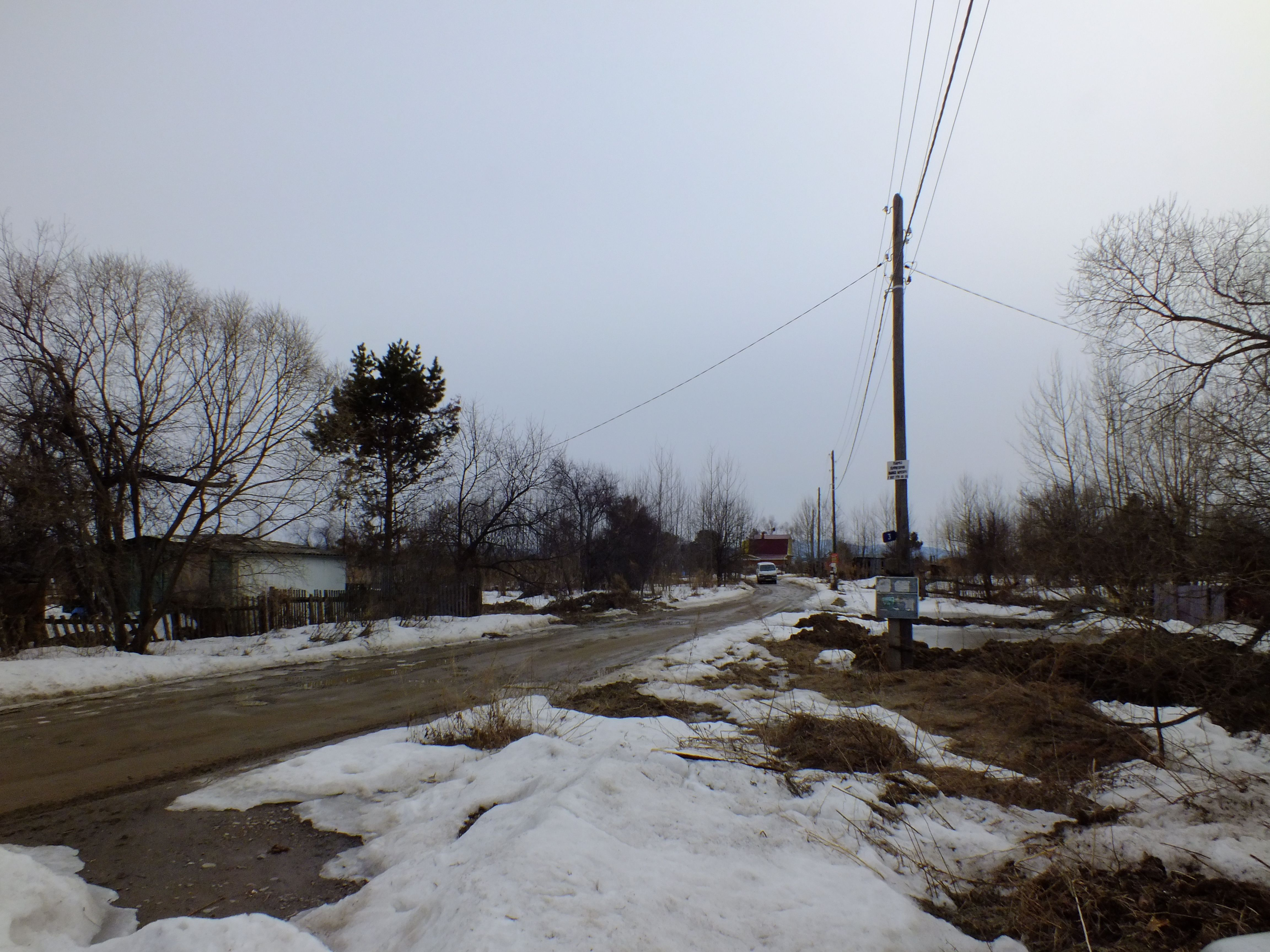
Osinovka Village, Jewish Autonomous Oblast

Osinovka (Russian: Осиновка) is a rural locality (a selo) in Smidovichsky District, Jewish Autonomous Oblast, Russia. Population: 20 (2010 census); 13 (2002 census); There are 2 streets in this selo.

== Geography ==
This rural locality is located 79 km from Smidovich (the district's administrative centre), 148 km from Birobidzhan (capital of Jewish Autonomous Oblast) and 7,128 km from Moscow. Vladimirovka is the nearest rural locality.
