= Klyuchevoye, Jewish Autonomous Oblast =

Klyuchevoye Ключевое
- Selo
- Location within Jewish Autonomous Oblast Location within Russia
- Coordinates: 48°32′N 134°43′E
- Country: Russia
- Region: Jewish Autonomous Oblast
- District: Smidovichsky District
- Time zone: UTC+10:00

Klyuchevoye (Russian: Ключевое) is a rural locality (a selo) in Smidovichsky District, Jewish Autonomous Oblast, Russia. Population: 874 (2010 census); 768 (2002 census); There are 14 streets in this selo.

== Geography ==
This rural locality is located 68 km from Smidovich (the district's administrative centre), 136 km from Birobidzhan (capital of Jewish Autonomous Oblast) and 7,195 km from Moscow. Dezhnyovka is the nearest rural locality.
