= Sadovoye, Jewish Autonomous Oblast =

Sadovoye Садовое
- Selo
- Location within Jewish Autonomous Oblast Location within Russia
- Coordinates: 47°45′N 131°26′E
- Country: Russia
- Region: Jewish Autonomous Oblast
- District: Oktyabrsky District
- Time zone: UTC+10:00

Sadovoye (Russian: Садовое) is a rural locality (a selo) in Oktyabrsky District, Jewish Autonomous Oblast, Russia. Population: 339 (2010 census); 459 (2002 census); There are 5 streets in this selo.

== Geography ==
This rural locality is located 27 km from Amurzet (the district's administrative centre), 159 km from Birobidzhan (capital of Jewish Autonomous Oblast) and 7,069 km from Moscow. Blagoslovennoye is the nearest rural locality.
