= Tyoplye Klyuchi =

Tyoplye Klyuchi Тёплые Ключи
- Selo
- Location within Jewish Autonomous Oblast Location within Russia
- Coordinates: 48°38′N 131°37′E
- Country: Russia
- Region: Jewish Autonomous Oblast
- District: Obluchensky District
- Time zone: UTC+10:00

Tyoplye Klyuchi (Russian: Тёплые Ключи) is a rural locality (a selo) in Obluchensky District, Jewish Autonomous Oblast, Russia. Population: 14 (2010 census); 41 (2002 census); There is 1 street in this selo.

== Geography ==
This rural locality is located 59 km from Obluchye (the district's administrative centre), 97 km from Birobidzhan (capital of Jewish Autonomous Oblast) and 6,952 km from Moscow. Sutara is the nearest rural locality.
