= Samara, Jewish Autonomous Oblast =

Samara Самара
- Selo
- Location within Jewish Autonomous Oblast Location within Russia
- Coordinates: 47°49′N 131°13′E
- Country: Russia
- Region: Jewish Autonomous Oblast
- District: Oktyabrsky District
- Time zone: UTC+10:00

Samara (Russian: Самара) is a rural locality (a selo) in Oktyabrsky District, Jewish Autonomous Oblast, Russia. Population: 369 (2010 census); 442 (2002 census); There are 8 streets in this selo.

== Geography ==
This rural locality is located 18 km from Amurzet (the district's administrative centre), 166 km from Birobidzhan (capital of Jewish Autonomous Oblast) and 7,044 km from Moscow. Polevoye is the nearest rural locality.
