= Trek, Jewish Autonomous Oblast =

Trek Трек
- Selo
- Location within Jewish Autonomous Oblast Location within Russia
- Coordinates: 48°54′N 132°43′E
- Country: Russia
- Region: Jewish Autonomous Oblast
- District: Obluchensky District
- Time zone: UTC+10:00

Trek (Russian: Трек) is a rural locality (a selo) in Obluchensky District, Jewish Autonomous Oblast, Russia. Population: 22 (2010 census); 88 (2002 census); There is 1 street in this selo.

== Geography ==
This rural locality is located 122 km from Obluchye (the district's administrative centre), 20 km from Birobidzhan (capital of Jewish Autonomous Oblast) and 6,991 km from Moscow. Semistochny is the nearest rural locality.
