= Oktyabrskoye, Jewish Autonomous Oblast =

Oktyabrskoye Октябрьское
- Selo
- Location within Jewish Autonomous Oblast Location within Russia
- Coordinates: 48°05′N 132°31′E
- Country: Russia
- Region: Jewish Autonomous Oblast
- District: Leninsky District
- Time zone: UTC+10:00

Oktyabrskoye (Russian: Октябрьское) is a rural locality (a selo) in Leninsky District, Jewish Autonomous Oblast, Russia. Population: 198 (2010 census); 214 (2002 census); There are 8 streets in this selo.

== Geography ==
This rural locality is located 19 km from Leninskoye (the district's administrative centre), 84 km from Birobidzhan (capital of Jewish Autonomous Oblast) and 7,100 km from Moscow. Babstovo is the nearest rural locality.
