= Sotsgorodok =

Sotsgorodok Соцгородок
- Selo
- Location within Jewish Autonomous Oblast Location within Russia
- Coordinates: 48°35′N 134°34′E
- Country: Russia
- Region: Jewish Autonomous Oblast
- District: Smidovichsky District
- Time zone: UTC+10:00

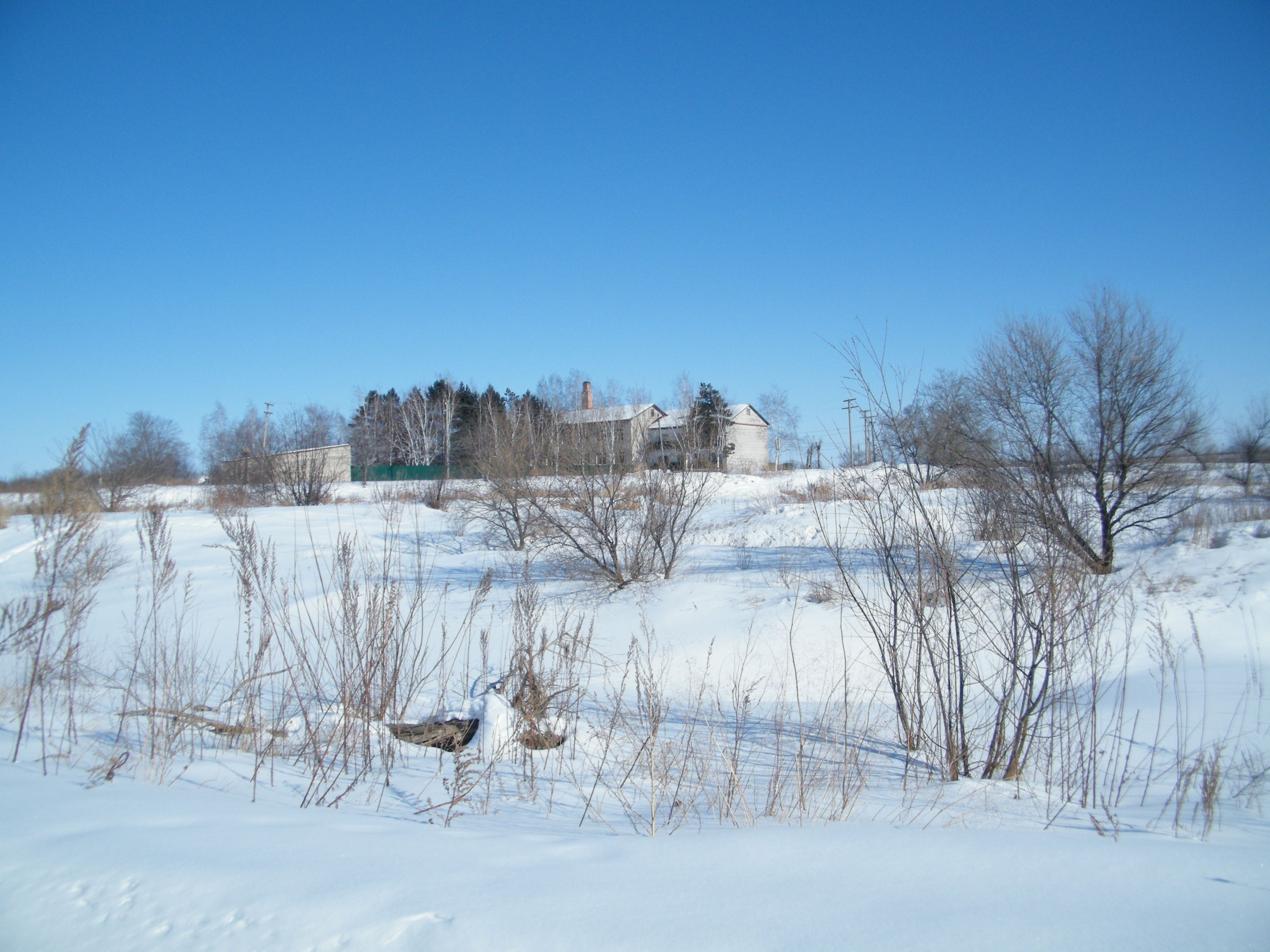
Home in Sotsgorodok

Sotsgorodok (Russian: Соцгородок) is a rural locality (a selo) in Smidovichsky District, Jewish Autonomous Oblast, Russia. Population: 180 (2010 census); 244 (2002 census); There are 4 streets in this selo.

== Geography ==
This rural locality is located 56 km from Smidovich (the district's administrative centre), 124 km from Birobidzhan (capital of Jewish Autonomous Oblast) and 7,176 km from Moscow. Danilovka is the nearest rural locality.
