= Stepnoye, Jewish Autonomous Oblast =

Stepnoye Степное
- Selo
- Location within Jewish Autonomous Oblast Location within Russia
- Coordinates: 47°53′N 131°54′E
- Country: Russia
- Region: Jewish Autonomous Oblast
- District: Leninsky District
- Time zone: UTC+10:00

Stepnoye (Russian: Степное) is a rural locality (a selo) in Leninsky District, Jewish Autonomous Oblast, Russia. Population: 533 (2010 census); 681 (2002 census); There are 14 streets in this selo.

== Geography ==
This rural locality is located 54 km from Leninskoye (the district's administrative centre), 126 km from Birobidzhan (capital of Jewish Autonomous Oblast) and 7,084 km from Moscow. Bidzhan is the nearest rural locality.
