= Administrative divisions of the Jewish Autonomous Oblast =

Jewish Autonomous Oblast Russia
- Administrative center: Birobidzhan

Administrative structure (as of 2013)
- Districts: 5
- Cities/towns: 2
- Urban-type settlements: 11
- Selsovets: 18

Municipal structure (as of 2002)
- Rural settlements: 98 (inhabited); 3 (uninhabited)

Jewish Autonomous Oblast is a federal subject of Russia.

== Administrative and municipal divisions ==
Map

Division	Structure		OKATO	OKTMO	Urban-type settlement/ district-level town*	Rural (rural okrug)
Division	Administrative	Municipal	OKATO	OKTMO	Urban-type settlement/ district-level town*	Rural (rural okrug)
Birobidzhan (Биробиджан)	city	urban okrug	99 401	99 701		
Birobidzhansky (Биробиджанский)	district		99 205	99 605		6
Leninsky (Ленинский)	district		99 210	99 610		5
Obluchensky (Облученский)	district		99 220	99 620	Obluchye (Облучье) town*; Bira (Бира); Birakan (Биракан); Izvestkovy (Известковый); Khingansk (Хинганск); Kuldur resort settlement (Кульдур); Londoko (Лондоко); Teploozyorsk (Теплоозёрск)	2
Oktyabrsky (Октябрьский)	district		99 225	99 625		3
Smidovichsky (Смидовичский)	district		99 230	99 630	Nikolayevka (Николаевка); Priamursky (Приамурский); Smidovich (Смидович); Volochayevka-2 (Волочаевка-2)	2
