= Obluchensky =

Obluchensky (masculine), Obluchenskaya (feminine), or Obluchenskoye (neuter) may refer to:

- Obluchensky District, a district of the Jewish Autonomous Oblast, Russia
- Obluchenskoye Urban Settlement, a municipal formation which the town of Obluchye and five rural localities in Obluchensky District of the Jewish Autonomous Oblast, Russia are incorporated as
