= Kalinino, Jewish Autonomous Oblast =

Kalinino Калинино
- Selo
- Location within Jewish Autonomous Oblast Location within Russia
- Coordinates: 48°00′N 132°35′E
- Country: Russia
- Region: Jewish Autonomous Oblast
- District: Leninsky District
- Time zone: UTC+10:00

Kalinino (Russian: Калинино) is a rural locality (a selo) in Leninsky District, Jewish Autonomous Oblast, Russia. Population: 538 (2010 census); 539 (2002 census); There are 9 streets in this selo.

== Geography ==
This rural locality is located 9 km from Leninskoye (the district's administrative centre), 91 km from Birobidzhan (capital of Jewish Autonomous Oblast) and 7,118 km from Moscow. Leninsk is the nearest rural locality.
