= Puzino =

Puzino Пузино
- Selo
- Location within Jewish Autonomous Oblast Location within Russia
- Coordinates: 47°44′N 131°12′E
- Country: Russia
- Region: Jewish Autonomous Oblast
- District: Oktyabrsky District
- Time zone: UTC+10:00

Puzino (Russian: Пузино) is a rural locality (a selo) in Oktyabrsky District, Jewish Autonomous Oblast, Russia. Population: 729 (2010 census); 922 (2002 census); There are 15 streets in this selo.

== Geography ==
This rural locality is located 10 km from Amurzet (the district's administrative centre), 174 km from Birobidzhan (capital of Jewish Autonomous Oblast) and 7,057 km from Moscow. Ozyornoye is the nearest rural locality.
