= Olgokhta =

Olgokhta Ольгохта
- Station
- Location within Jewish Autonomous Oblast Location within Russia
- Coordinates: 48°36′N 134°09′E
- Country: Russia
- Region: Jewish Autonomous Oblast
- District: Smidovichsky District
- Time zone: UTC+10:00

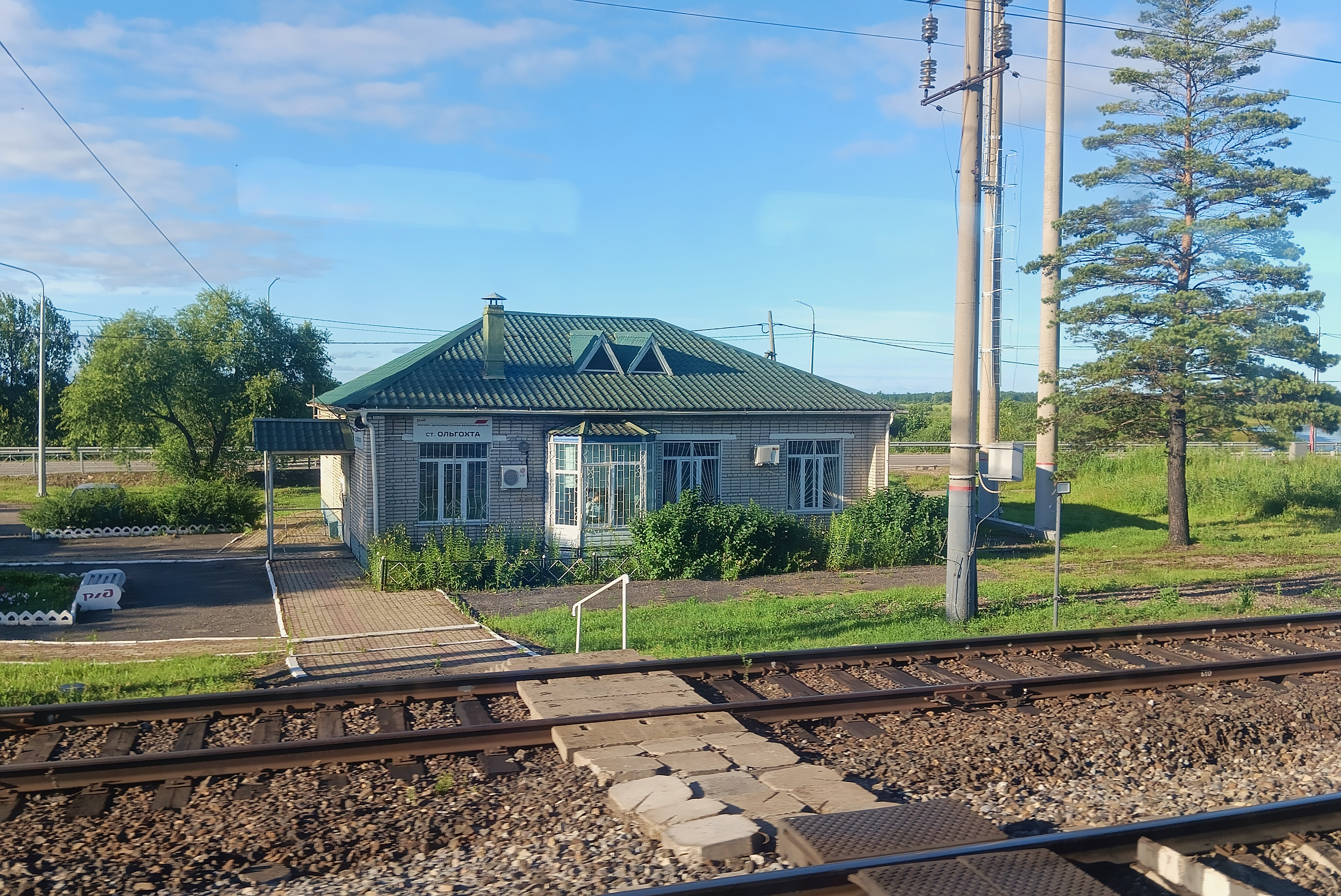
Olgokhta station, 2024

Olgokhta (Russian: Ольгохта) is a rural locality (a station) in Smidovichsky District, Jewish Autonomous Oblast, Russia. Population: 72 (2010 census); 82 (2002 census); There is 1 street in this station.

== Geography ==
This rural locality is located 25 km from Smidovich (the district's administrative centre), 93 km from Birobidzhan (capital of Jewish Autonomous Oblast) and 7,142 km from Moscow. Urmi is the nearest rural locality.
