= Nagibovo =

Nagibovo Нагибово
- Selo
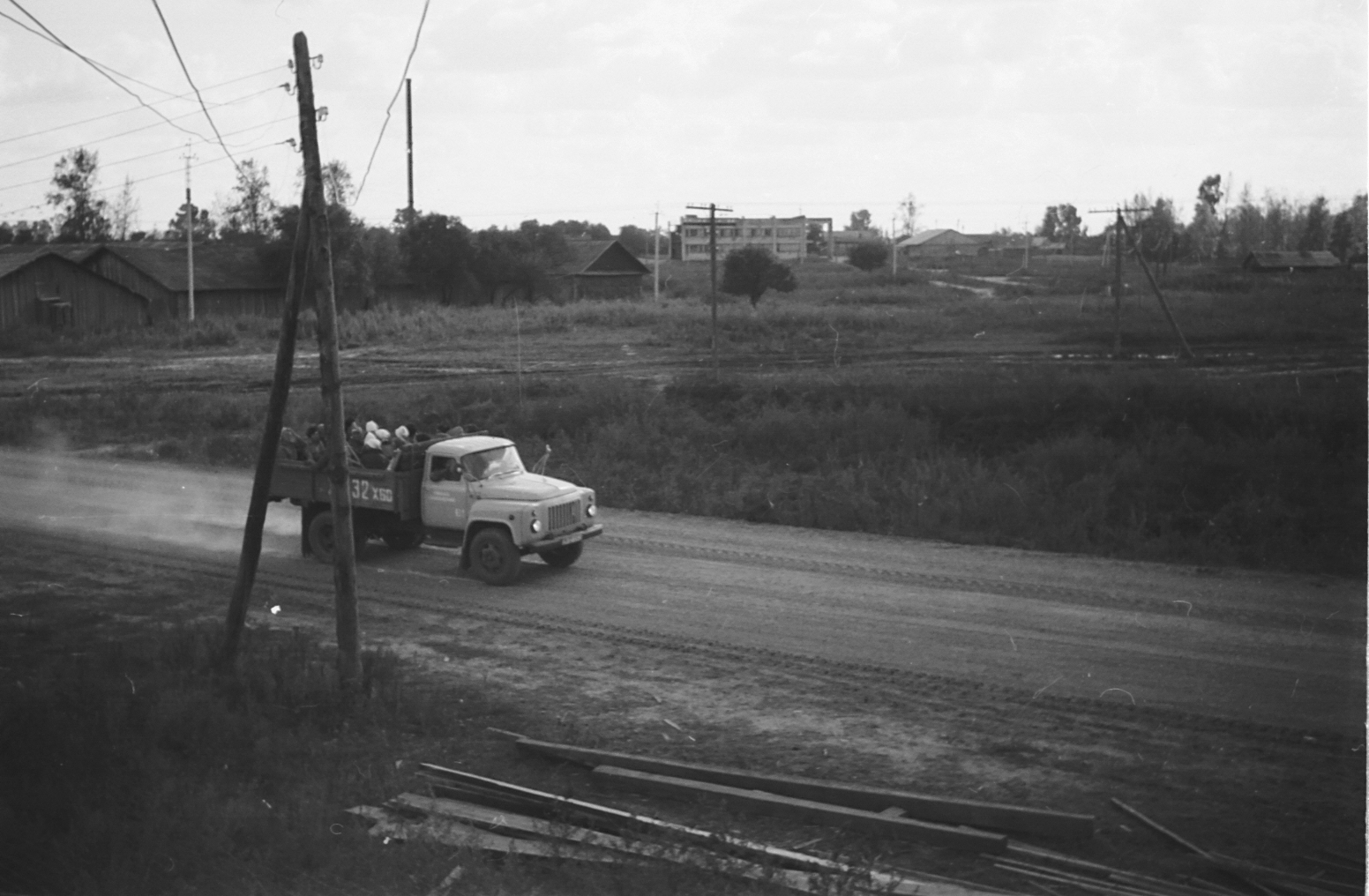
- Road at Nagibovo

- Location within Jewish Autonomous Oblast Location within Russia
- Coordinates: 47°44′N 131°32′E
- Country: Russia
- Region: Jewish Autonomous Oblast
- District: Oktyabrsky District
- Time zone: UTC+10:00

Nagibovo (Russian: Нагибово) is a rural locality (a selo) in Oktyabrsky District, Jewish Autonomous Oblast, Russia. Population: 534 (2010 census); 621 (2002 census); There are 11 streets in this selo.

== Geography ==
This rural locality is located 33 km from Amurzet (the district's administrative centre), 156 km from Birobidzhan (capital of Jewish Autonomous Oblast) and 7,079 km from Moscow. Sadovoye is the nearest rural locality.
