= Ikura, Jewish Autonomous Oblast =

Ikura Икура
- Station
- Location within Jewish Autonomous Oblast Location within Russia
- Coordinates: 48°43′N 133°06′E
- Country: Russia
- Region: Jewish Autonomous Oblast
- District: Smidovichsky District
- Time zone: UTC+10:00

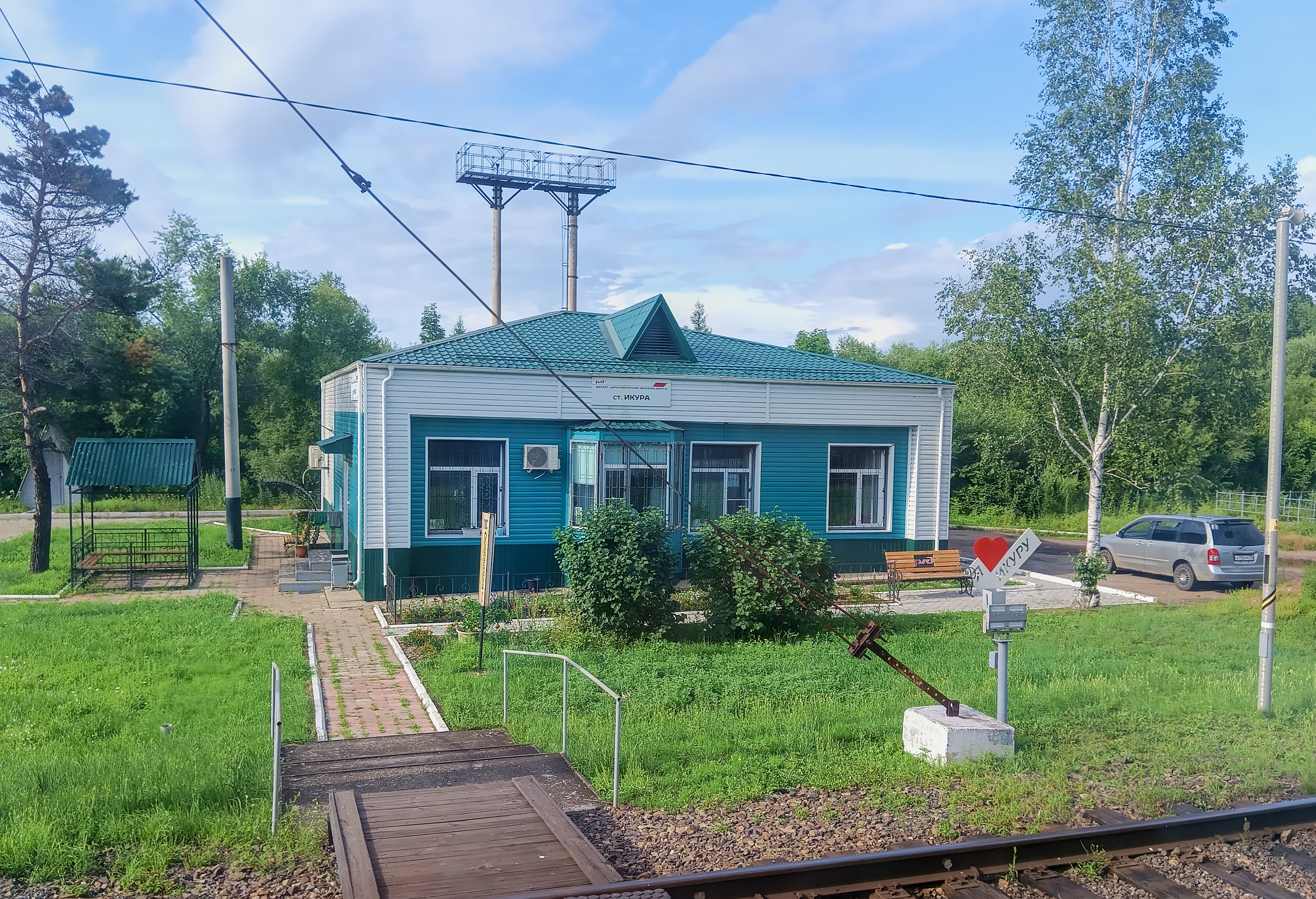
Ikura station

Ikura (Russian: Икура) is a rural locality (a station) in Smidovichsky District, Jewish Autonomous Oblast, Russia. Population: 20 (2010 census); 14 (2002 census); There is 1 street in this station.

== Geography ==
This rural locality is located 54 km from Smidovich (the district's administrative centre), 16 km from Birobidzhan (capital of Jewish Autonomous Oblast) and 7,048 km from Moscow. Valdgeym is the nearest rural locality.
