= Udarny =

Udarny (Russian: Ударный; masculine), Udarnaya (Ударная; feminine), or Udarnoye (Ударное; neuter) is the name of several inhabited localities in Russia.

Urban localities

- Udarny, Karachay-Cherkess Republic, a work settlement in Prikubansky District of the Karachay-Cherkess Republic; 44°21′N 42°31′E

Rural localities

- Udarny, Jewish Autonomous Oblast, a station in Obluchensky District of the Jewish Autonomous Oblast
- Udarny, Krasnodar Krai, a khutor in Staroderevyankovsky Rural Okrug of Kanevskoy District in Krasnodar Krai; 46°13′N 39°1′E
- Udarny, Republic of Mordovia, a settlement in Lepleysky Selsoviet of Zubovo-Polyansky District in the Republic of Mordovia; 54°21′N 42°51′E
- Udarny, Omsk Oblast, a settlement in Krasnopolyansky Rural Okrug of Gorkovsky District in Omsk Oblast; 55°11′N 74°14′E
- Udarny, Orenburg Oblast, a settlement in Rubezhinsky Selsoviet of Pervomaysky District in Orenburg Oblast
- Udarny, Stavropol Krai, a settlement in Prisadovy Selsoviet of Novoalexandrovsky District in Stavropol Krai
- Udarnoye, Amur Oblast, a selo in Polyansky Rural Settlement of Seryshevsky District in Amur Oblast
- Udarnoye, Belogorsky District, Republic of Crimea, a selo in Belogorsky District of the Republic of Crimea
- Udarnoye, Dzhankoysky District, Republic of Crimea, a selo in Dzhankoysky District of the Republic of Crimea
- Udarnoye, Kaliningrad Oblast, a settlement in Kaluzhsky Rural Okrug of Chernyakhovsky District in Kaliningrad Oblast
- Udarnoye, Krasnodar Krai, a selo in Kiyevsky Rural Okrug of Krymsky District in Krasnodar Krai; 45°3′N 37°52′E
- Udarnoye, Primorsky Krai, a selo in Dalnerechensky District of Primorsky Krai
- Udarnoye, Sakhalin Oblast, a selo under the administrative jurisdiction of the town of district significance of Shakhtyorsk in Uglegorsky District of Sakhalin Oblast
