= Ungun =

Ungun Унгун
- Selo
- Location within Jewish Autonomous Oblast Location within Russia
- Coordinates: 48°12′N 132°24′E
- Country: Russia
- Region: Jewish Autonomous Oblast
- District: Leninsky District
- Time zone: UTC+10:00

Ungun (Russian: Унгун) is a rural locality (a selo) in Leninsky District, Jewish Autonomous Oblast, Russia. Population: 322 (2010 census); 374 (2002 census); There are 14 streets in this selo.

== Geography ==
This rural locality is located 35 km from Leninskoye (the district's administrative centre), 75 km from Birobidzhan (capital of Jewish Autonomous Oblast) and 7,074 km from Moscow. Lazarevo is the nearest rural locality.
