= Budukan =

Budukan Будукан
- Selo
- Location within Jewish Autonomous Oblast Location within Russia
- Coordinates: 49°00′N 132°13′E
- Country: Russia
- Region: Jewish Autonomous Oblast
- District: Obluchensky District
- Time zone: UTC+10:00

Budukan (Russian: Будукан) is a rural locality (a selo) in Obluchensky District, Jewish Autonomous Oblast, Russia. Population: 1,107 (2010 census); 1,479 (2002 census); There are 6 streets in this selo.

== Geography ==
This rural locality is located 86 km from Obluchye (the district's administrative centre), 56 km from Birobidzhan (capital of Jewish Autonomous Oblast) and 6,940 km from Moscow. Londoko is the nearest rural locality.
