= Peschanoye, Jewish Autonomous Oblast =

Peschanoye Песчаное
- Selo
- Location within Jewish Autonomous Oblast Location within Russia
- Coordinates: 48°36′N 133°51′E
- Country: Russia
- Region: Jewish Autonomous Oblast
- District: Smidovichsky District
- Time zone: UTC+10:00

Peschanoye (Russian: Песчаное) is a rural locality (a selo) in Smidovichsky District, Jewish Autonomous Oblast, Russia. Population: 1,088 (2010 census); 1,076 (2002 census); There are 15 streets in this selo.

== Geography ==
This rural locality is located 4 km from Smidovich (the district's administrative centre), 72 km from Birobidzhan (capital of Jewish Autonomous Oblast) and 7,120 km from Moscow. Smidovich is the nearest rural locality.
