= Kukelevo =

Kukelevo Кукелево
- Selo
- Location within Jewish Autonomous Oblast Location within Russia
- Coordinates: 47°53′N 132°31′E
- Country: Russia
- Region: Jewish Autonomous Oblast
- District: Leninsky District
- Time zone: UTC+10:00

Kukelevo (Russian: Кукелево) is a rural locality (a selo) in Leninsky District, Jewish Autonomous Oblast, Russia. Population: 893 (2010 census); 1,053 (2002 census); There are 10 streets in this selo.

== Geography ==
This rural locality is located 9 km from Leninskoye (the district's administrative centre), 105 km from Birobidzhan (capital of Jewish Autonomous Oblast) and 7,130 km from Moscow. Leninskoye is the nearest rural locality.
