= Londoko (selo) =

Londoko Лондоко
- Selo
- Location within Jewish Autonomous Oblast Location within Russia
- Coordinates: 49°00′N 131°59′E
- Country: Russia
- Region: Jewish Autonomous Oblast
- District: Obluchensky District
- Time zone: UTC+10:00

Londoko (Russian: Лондоко) is a rural locality (a selo) in Obluchensky District, Jewish Autonomous Oblast, Russia. Population: 238 (2010 census); 366 (2002 census); There are 8 streets in this selo.

== Geography ==
This rural locality is located 68 km from Obluchye (the district's administrative centre), 72 km from Birobidzhan (capital of Jewish Autonomous Oblast) and 6,923 km from Moscow. Teploozersk is the nearest rural locality.
