= Ventselevo =

Ventselevo Венцелево
- Selo
- Location within Jewish Autonomous Oblast Location within Russia
- Coordinates: 47°24′N 132°10′E
- Country: Russia
- Region: Jewish Autonomous Oblast
- District: Leninsky District
- Time zone: UTC+10:00

Ventselevo (Russian: Венцелево) is a rural locality (a selo) in Leninsky District, Jewish Autonomous Oblast, Russia. Population: 383 (2010 census); 550 (2002 census); There are 5 streets in this selo.

== Geography ==
This rural locality is located 54 km from Leninskoye (the district's administrative centre), 134 km from Birobidzhan (capital of Jewish Autonomous Oblast) and 7,102 km from Moscow. Stepnoye is the nearest rural locality.
