= Solovyovka, Jewish Autonomous Oblast =

Solovyovka Соловьёвка
- Selo
- Location within Jewish Autonomous Oblast Location within Russia
- Coordinates: 49°05′N 131°05′E
- Country: Russia
- Region: Jewish Autonomous Oblast
- District: Obluchensky District
- Time zone: UTC+10:00

Solovyovka (Russian: Соловьёвка) is a rural locality (a selo) in Obluchensky District, Jewish Autonomous Oblast, Russia. Population: 18 (2010 census); 42 (2002 census); There is 1 street in this selo.

== Geography ==
This rural locality is located 10 km from Obluchye (the district's administrative centre), 138 km from Birobidzhan (capital of Jewish Autonomous Oblast) and 6,845 km from Moscow. Khingansk is the nearest rural locality.
