= Dvurechye =

Dvurechye Двуречье
- Selo
- Location within Jewish Autonomous Oblast Location within Russia
- Coordinates: 48°58′N 131°34′E
- Country: Russia
- Region: Jewish Autonomous Oblast
- District: Obluchensky District
- Time zone: UTC+10:00

Dvurechye (Russian: Двуречье) is a rural locality (a selo) in Obluchensky District, Jewish Autonomous Oblast, Russia. Population: 657 (2010 census); 867 (2002 census); There are 12 streets in this selo.

== Geography ==
This rural locality is located 39 km from Obluchye (the district's administrative centre), 99 km from Birobidzhan (capital of Jewish Autonomous Oblast) and 6,901 km from Moscow. Vervoye Zarechye is the nearest rural locality.
