= Petrovka, Jewish Autonomous Oblast =

Petrovka Петровка
- Selo
- Location within Jewish Autonomous Oblast Location within Russia
- Coordinates: 48°24′N 133°10′E
- Country: Russia
- Region: Jewish Autonomous Oblast
- District: Birobidzhansky District
- Time zone: UTC+10:00

Petrovka (Russian: Петровка) is a rural locality (a selo) in Birobidzhansky District, Jewish Autonomous Oblast, Russia. Population: 106 (2010 census); 164 (2002 census); There are 4 streets in this selo.

== Geography ==
This rural locality is located 48 km from Birobidzhan (the district's administrative centre and capital of Jewish Autonomous Oblast) and 7,102 km from Moscow. Dubovoye is the nearest rural locality.
