= Aur, Jewish Autonomous Oblast =

Aur Аур
- Selo
- Location within Jewish Autonomous Oblast Location within Russia
- Coordinates: 48°37′N 133°26′E
- Country: Russia
- Region: Jewish Autonomous Oblast
- District: Smidovichsky District
- Time zone: UTC+10:00

Aur (Russian: Аур) is a rural locality (a selo) in Smidovichsky District, Jewish Autonomous Oblast, Russia. Population: 741 (2010 census); 739 (2002 census); There are 5 streets in this selo.

== Geography ==
This rural locality is located 28 km from Smidovich (the district's administrative centre), 42 km from Birobidzhan (capital of Jewish Autonomous Oblast) and 7,087 km from Moscow. Ol is the nearest rural locality.
