= Dobroye, Jewish Autonomous Oblast =

Dobroye Доброе
- Selo
- Location within Jewish Autonomous Oblast Location within Russia
- Coordinates: 47°45′N 131°40′E
- Country: Russia
- Region: Jewish Autonomous Oblast
- District: Oktyabrsky District
- Time zone: UTC+10:00

Dobroye (Russian: Доброе) is a rural locality (a selo) in Oktyabrsky District, Jewish Autonomous Oblast, Russia. Population: 158 (2010 census); 250 (2002 census); There are 3 streets in this selo.

== Geography ==
This rural locality is located 44 km from Amurzet (the district's administrative centre), 148 km from Birobidzhan (capital of Jewish Autonomous Oblast) and 7,086 km from Moscow. Rucheyki is the nearest rural locality.
