= Tselinnoye, Jewish Autonomous Oblast =

Tselinnoye Целинное
- Selo
- Location within Jewish Autonomous Oblast Location within Russia
- Coordinates: 48°07′N 132°24′E
- Country: Russia
- Region: Jewish Autonomous Oblast
- District: Leninsky District
- Time zone: UTC+10:00

Tselinnoye (Russian: Целинное) is a rural locality (a selo) in Leninsky District, Jewish Autonomous Oblast, Russia. Population: 60 (2010 census); 123 (2002 census); There are 5 streets in this selo.

== Geography ==
This rural locality is located 26 km from Leninskoye (the district's administrative centre), 84 km from Birobidzhan (capital of Jewish Autonomous Oblast) and 7,087 km from Moscow. Gornoye is the nearest rural locality.
