= Obluchye =

Obluchye (Russian: Облучье) is the name of several inhabited localities in Russia.

== Urban localities ==
- Obluchye, Jewish Autonomous Oblast, a town in Obluchensky District of the Jewish Autonomous Oblast

== Rural localities ==
- Obluchye, Novgorod Oblast, a village in Gruzinskoye Settlement of Chudovsky District in Novgorod Oblast
- Obluchye, Pskov Oblast, a village in Dedovichsky District of Pskov Oblast
- Obluchye, Tula Oblast, a settlement in Krasivskaya Rural Administration of Chernsky District in Tula Oblast.
