= Ekaterino-Nikolskoye =

Ekaterino-Nikolskoye Екатерино-Никольское
- Selo
- Location within Jewish Autonomous Oblast Location within Russia
- Coordinates: 47°44′N 130°57′E
- Country: Russia
- Region: Jewish Autonomous Oblast
- District: Oktyabrsky District
- Time zone: UTC+10:00

Ekaterino-Nikolskoye (Russian: Екатерино-Никольское) is a rural locality (a selo) in Oktyabrsky District, Jewish Autonomous Oblast, Russia. Population: 1,715 (2010 census); 1,975 (2002 census); There are 12 streets in this selo.

== Geography ==
This rural locality is located 12 km from Amurzet (the district's administrative centre), 187 km from Birobidzhan (capital of Jewish Autonomous Oblast) and 7,036 km from Moscow. Amurzet is the nearest rural locality.
