= Selo imeni Telmana =

Selo imeni Telmana Село имени Тельмана
- Selo
- Location within Jewish Autonomous Oblast Location within Russia
- Coordinates: 48°32′N 134°58′E
- Country: Russia
- Region: Jewish Autonomous Oblast
- District: Smidovichsky District
- Time zone: UTC+10:00

Selo imeni Telmana (Russian: Село имени Тельмана) is a rural locality (a selo) in Smidovichsky District, Jewish Autonomous Oblast, Russia. Population: 1,210 (2010 census); 1,110 (2002 census);

== Geography ==
This rural locality is located 86 km from Smidovich (the district's administrative centre), 154 km from Birobidzhan (capital of Jewish Autonomous Oblast) and 7,211 km from Moscow. Priamursky is the nearest rural locality.
