= Novotroitskoye, Jewish Autonomous Oblast =

Novotroitskoye Новотроицкое
- Selo
- Location within Jewish Autonomous Oblast Location within Russia
- Coordinates: 48°15′N 131°57′E
- Country: Russia
- Region: Jewish Autonomous Oblast
- District: Leninsky District
- Time zone: UTC+10:00

Novotroitskoye (Russian: Новотроицкое) is a rural locality (a selo) in Leninsky District, Jewish Autonomous Oblast, Russia. Population: 279 (2010 census); 381 (2002 census); There are 7 streets in this selo.

== Geography ==
This rural locality is located 56 km from Leninskoye (the district's administrative centre), 97 km from Birobidzhan (capital of Jewish Autonomous Oblast) and 7,044 km from Moscow. Preobrazhenovka is the nearest rural locality.
