= Lagar-Aul =

Lagar-Aul Лагар-Аул
- Station
- Location within Jewish Autonomous Oblast Location within Russia
- Coordinates: 49°00′N 131°13′E
- Country: Russia
- Region: Jewish Autonomous Oblast
- District: Obluchensky District
- Time zone: UTC+10:00

Lagar-Aul (Russian: Лагар-Аул) is a rural locality (a station) in Obluchensky District, Jewish Autonomous Oblast, Russia. Population: 7 (2010 census); 61 (2002 census); There is 1 street in this station.

== Geography ==
This rural locality is located 13 km from Obluchye (the district's administrative centre), 125 km from Birobidzhan (capital of Jewish Autonomous Oblast) and 6,870 km from Moscow. Udarny is the nearest rural locality.
