= Belgorodskoye, Jewish Autonomous Oblast =

Belgorodskoye Белгородское
- Selo
- Location within Jewish Autonomous Oblast Location within Russia
- Coordinates: 48°35′N 133°43′E
- Country: Russia
- Region: Jewish Autonomous Oblast
- District: Smidovichsky District
- Time zone: UTC+10:00

Belgorodskoye (Russian: Белгородское) is a rural locality (a selo) in Smidovichsky District, Jewish Autonomous Oblast, Russia. Population: 535 (2010 census); 538 (2002 census); There are 13 streets in this selo.

== Geography ==
This rural locality is located 7 km from Smidovich (the district's administrative centre), 63 km from Birobidzhan (capital of Jewish Autonomous Oblast) and 7,113 km from Moscow. Smidovich is the nearest rural locality.
