= Izvestkovy, Jewish Autonomous Oblast =

Izvestkovy Известковый
- Urban-type settlement
- Location within Jewish Autonomous Oblast Location within Russia
- Coordinates: 48°59′N 131°32′E
- Country: Russia
- Region: Jewish Autonomous Oblast
- District: Obluchensky District
- Time zone: UTC+10:00

Izvestkovy (Russian: Известковый) is a rural locality (an urban-type settlement) in Obluchensky District, Jewish Autonomous Oblast, Russia. Population: 1,809 (2010 census); 2,229 (2002 census); There are 33 streets in this selo.

== Geography ==
This rural locality is located 36 km from Obluchye (the district's administrative centre), 102 km from Birobidzhan (capital of Jewish Autonomous Oblast) and 6,896 km from Moscow. Pervoye Zarechye is the nearest rural locality.
