= Volochayevka =

Volochayevka may refer to the following places in Russia:

- Volochayevka-1
- Volochayevka-2
