= Bidzhan (rural locality) =

Bidzhan Биджан
- Selo
- Location within Jewish Autonomous Oblast Location within Russia
- Coordinates: 47°58′N 131°56′E
- Country: Russia
- Region: Jewish Autonomous Oblast
- District: Leninsky District
- Time zone: UTC+10:00

Bidzhan (Russian: Биджан) is a rural locality (a selo) in Leninsky District, Jewish Autonomous Oblast, Russia. Population: 1,635 (2010 census); 2,002 (2002 census); There are 23 streets in this selo.

== Geography ==
This rural locality is located 51 km from Leninskoye (the district's administrative centre), 117 km from Birobidzhan (capital of Jewish Autonomous Oblast) and 7,074 km from Moscow. Bashmak is the nearest rural locality.
