= Bashurovo =

Bashurovo Башурово
- Selo
- Location within Jewish Autonomous Oblast Location within Russia
- Coordinates: 48°41′N 130°35′E
- Country: Russia
- Region: Jewish Autonomous Oblast
- District: Obluchensky District
- Time zone: UTC+10:00

Bashurovo (Russian: Башурово) is a rural locality (a selo) in Obluchensky District, Jewish Autonomous Oblast, Russia. Population: 164 (2010 census); 322 (2002 census); There are 6 streets in this selo.

== Geography ==
This rural locality is located 49 km from Obluchye (the district's administrative centre), 171 km from Birobidzhan (capital of Jewish Autonomous Oblast) and 6,869 km from Moscow. Radde is the nearest rural locality.
