= Udarny, Jewish Autonomous Oblast =

Udarny Ударный
- Station
- Location within Jewish Autonomous Oblast Location within Russia
- Coordinates: 48°59′N 131°07′E
- Country: Russia
- Region: Jewish Autonomous Oblast
- District: Obluchensky District
- Time zone: UTC+10:00

Udarny (Russian: Ударный) is a rural locality (a station) in Obluchensky District, Jewish Autonomous Oblast, Russia. Population: 8 (2002 census); There are 2 streets in this station.

== Geography ==
This rural locality is located 7 km from Obluchye (the district's administrative centre), 132 km from Birobidzhan (capital of Jewish Autonomous Oblast) and 6,865 km from Moscow. Obluchye is the nearest rural locality.
