= Russkaya Polyana, Jewish Autonomous Oblast =

Russkaya Polyana Русская Поляна
- Selo
- Location within Jewish Autonomous Oblast Location within Russia
- Coordinates: 48°19′N 133°14′E
- Country: Russia
- Region: Jewish Autonomous Oblast
- District: Birobidzhansky District
- Time zone: UTC+10:00

Russkaya Polyana (Russian: Русская Поляна) is a rural locality (a selo) in Birobidzhansky District, Jewish Autonomous Oblast, Russia. Population: 98 (2010 census); 138 (2002 census); There are 2 streets in this selo.

== Geography ==
This rural locality is located 58 km from Birobidzhan (the district's administrative centre and capital of Jewish Autonomous Oblast) and 7,118 km from Moscow. Nadezhdinskoye is the nearest rural locality.
