= Sutara =

Sutara Сутара
- Selo
- Location within Jewish Autonomous Oblast Location within Russia
- Coordinates: 48°49′N 131°15′E
- Country: Russia
- Region: Jewish Autonomous Oblast
- District: Obluchensky District
- Time zone: UTC+10:00

Sutara (Russian: Сутара) is a rural locality (a selo) in Obluchensky District, Jewish Autonomous Oblast, Russia. Population: 7 (2010 census); 103 (2002 census); There is 1 street in this selo.

== Geography ==
This rural locality is located 25 km from Obluchye (the district's administrative centre), 122 km from Birobidzhan (capital of Jewish Autonomous Oblast) and 6,897 km from Moscow. Udarny is the nearest rural locality.
