= Bashmak =

Bashmak Башмак
- Selo
- Location within Jewish Autonomous Oblast Location within Russia
- Coordinates: 47°56′N 132°01′E
- Country: Russia
- Region: Jewish Autonomous Oblast
- District: Leninsky District, Russia
- Time zone: UTC+10:00

Bashmak (Russian: Башмак) is a rural locality (a selo) in Leninsky District, Russia, Jewish Autonomous Oblast, Russia. Population: 559 (2010 census); 687 (2002 census); There are 6 streets in this selo.

== Geography ==
This rural locality is located 44 km from Leninskoye (the district's administrative centre), 116 km from Birobidzhan (capital of Jewish Autonomous Oblast) and 7,086 km from Moscow. Bidzhan is the nearest rural locality.
