= Dezhnyovo, Jewish Autonomous Oblast =

Dezhnyovo Дежнёво
- Selo
- Location within Jewish Autonomous Oblast Location within Russia
- Coordinates: 47°47′N 132°11′E
- Country: Russia
- Region: Jewish Autonomous Oblast
- District: Leninsky District
- Time zone: UTC+10:00

Dezhnyovo (Russian: Дежнёво) is a rural locality (a selo) in Leninsky District, Jewish Autonomous Oblast, Russia. Population: 966 (2010 census); 1,022 (2002 census); There are 9 streets in this selo.

== Geography ==
This rural locality is located 35 km from Leninskoye (the district's administrative centre), 123 km from Birobidzhan (capital of Jewish Autonomous Oblast) and 7,120 km from Moscow. Kvashnino is the nearest rural locality.
