= Golovino, Jewish Autonomous Oblast =

Golovino Головино
- Selo
- Location within Jewish Autonomous Oblast Location within Russia
- Coordinates: 48°12′N 132°11′E
- Country: Russia
- Region: Jewish Autonomous Oblast
- District: Birobidzhansky District
- Time zone: UTC+10:00

Golovino (Russian: Головино) is a rural locality (a selo) in Birobidzhansky District, Jewish Autonomous Oblast, Russia. Population: 279 (2010 census); 334 (2002 census); There are 9 streets in this selo.

== Geography ==
This rural locality is located 69 km from Birobidzhan (the district's administrative centre and capital of Jewish Autonomous Oblast) and 7,133 km from Moscow. Nadezhdinskoye is the nearest rural locality.
