= Kamyshovka, Jewish Autonomous Oblast =

Kamyshovka Камышовка
- Selo
- Location within Jewish Autonomous Oblast Location within Russia
- Coordinates: 48°33′N 134°36′E
- Country: Russia
- Region: Jewish Autonomous Oblast
- District: Smidovichsky District
- Time zone: UTC+10:00

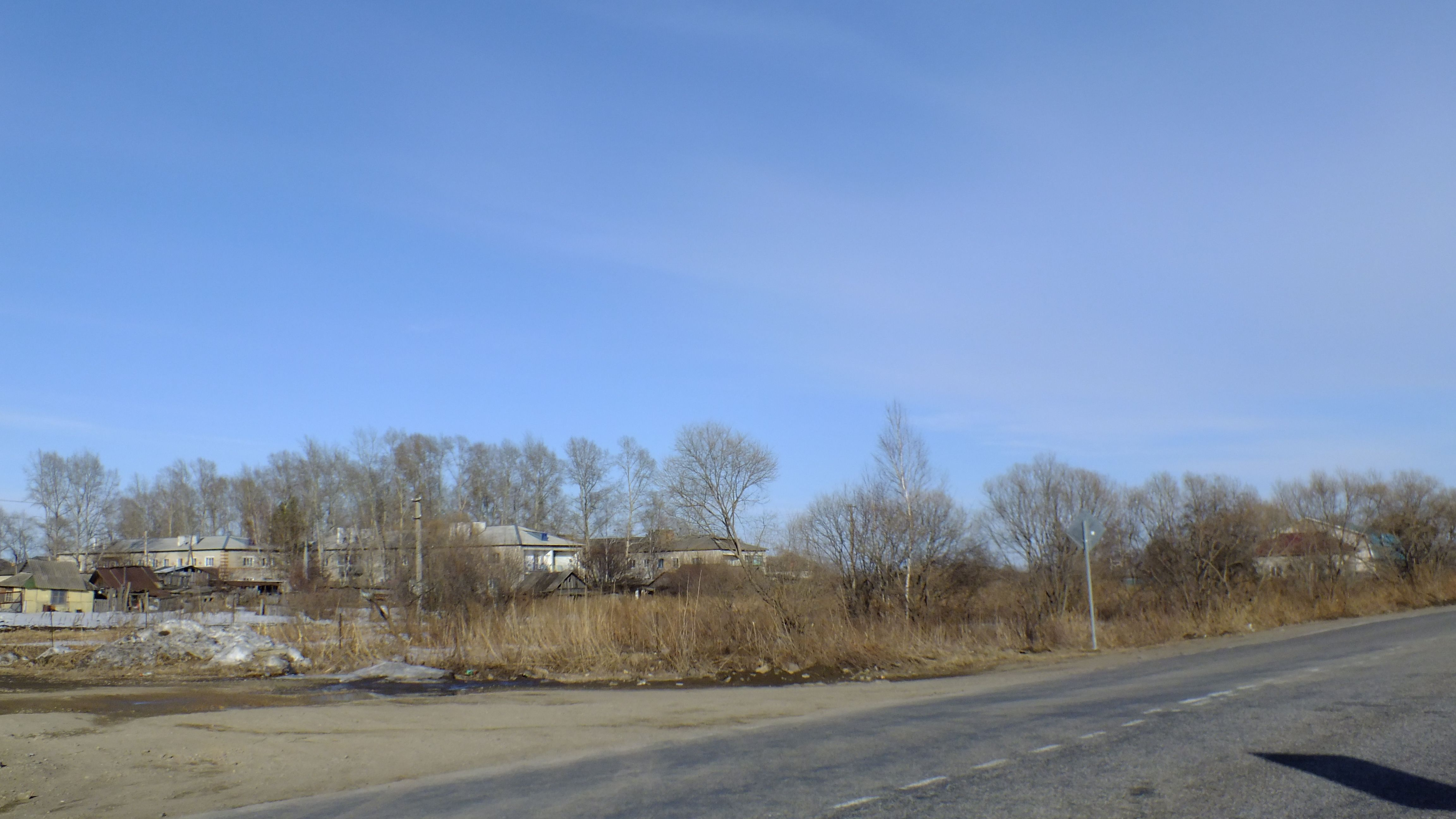

Kamyshovka (Russian: Камышовка) is a rural locality (a selo) in Smidovichsky District, Jewish Autonomous Oblast, Russia. Population: 1,123 (2010 census); 1,084 (2002 census); There are 10 streets in this selo.

== Geography ==
This rural locality is located 58 km from Smidovich (the district's administrative centre), 127 km from Birobidzhan (capital of Jewish Autonomous Oblast) and 7,184 km from Moscow. Volochayevka-2 is the nearest rural locality.
