= Pronkino =

Pronkino Пронькино
- Selo
- Location within Jewish Autonomous Oblast Location within Russia
- Coordinates: 48°36′N 132°59′E
- Country: Russia
- Region: Jewish Autonomous Oblast
- District: Birobidzhansky District
- Time zone: UTC+10:00

Pronkino (Russian: Пронькино) is a rural locality (a selo) in Birobidzhansky District, Jewish Autonomous Oblast, Russia. Population: 481 (2010 census); 539 (2002 census); There are 5 streets in this selo.

== Geography ==
This rural locality is located 21 km from Birobidzhan (the district's administrative centre and capital of Jewish Autonomous Oblast) and 7,056 km from Moscow. Krasy Vostok is the nearest rural locality.
