= Kazanka, Jewish Autonomous Oblast =

Kazanka Казанка
- Selo
- Location within Jewish Autonomous Oblast Location within Russia
- Coordinates: 48°28′N 133°03′E
- Country: Russia
- Region: Jewish Autonomous Oblast
- District: Birobidzhansky District
- Time zone: UTC+10:00

Kazanka (Russian: Казанка) is a rural locality (a selo) in Birobidzhansky District, Jewish Autonomous Oblast, Russia. Population: 220 (2010 census); 302 (2002 census); There are 6 streets in this selo.

== Geography ==
This rural locality is located 38 km from Birobidzhan (the district's administrative centre and capital of Jewish Autonomous Oblast) and 7,083 km from Moscow. Nayfeld is the nearest rural locality.
