= Snarsky =

Snarsky Снарский
- Selo
- Location within Jewish Autonomous Oblast Location within Russia
- Coordinates: 48°59′N 131°30′E
- Country: Russia
- Region: Jewish Autonomous Oblast
- District: Obluchensky District
- Time zone: UTC+10:00

Snarsky (Russian: Снарский) is a rural locality (a selo) in Obluchensky District, Jewish Autonomous Oblast, Russia. Population: 34 (2010 census); 32 (2002 census); There are 3 streets in this selo.

== Geography ==
This rural locality is located 34 km from Obluchye (the district's administrative centre), 105 km from Birobidzhan (capital of Jewish Autonomous Oblast) and 6,893 km from Moscow. Izvestkovy is the nearest rural locality.
