= Vladimirovka, Jewish Autonomous Oblast =

Vladimirovka Владимировка
- Selo
- Location within Jewish Autonomous Oblast Location within Russia
- Coordinates: 48°27′N 134°53′E
- Country: Russia
- Region: Jewish Autonomous Oblast
- District: Smidovichsky District
- Time zone: UTC+10:00

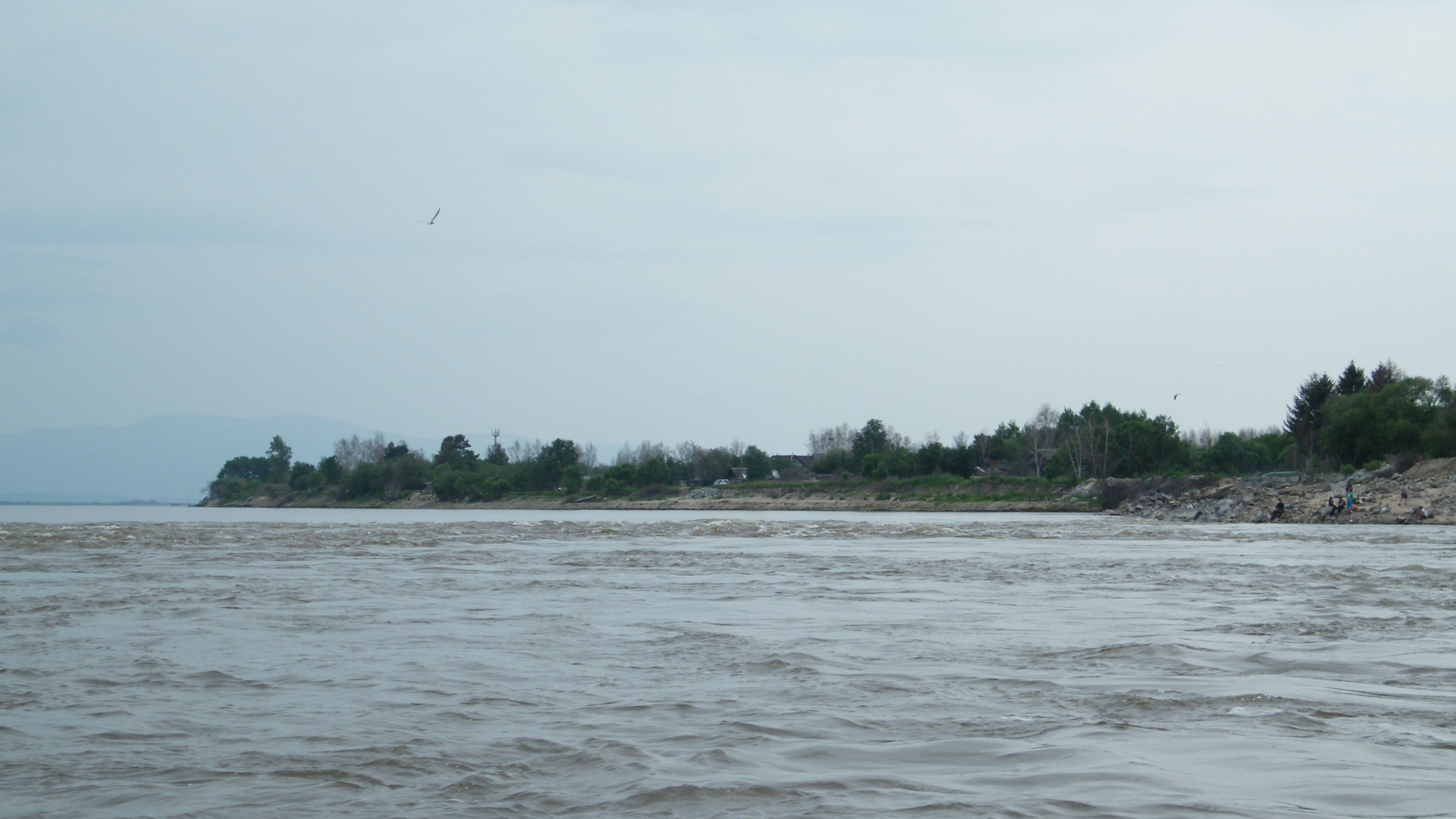
Overflow dam on the Pemzenskaya channel, Vladimirovka village, June 2014

Vladimirovka (Russian: Владимировка) is a rural locality (a selo) in Smidovichsky District, Jewish Autonomous Oblast, Russia. Population: 31 (2010 census); 25 (2002 census); There are 4 streets in this selo.

== Geography ==
This rural locality is located 81 km from Smidovich (the district's administrative centre), 150 km from Birobidzhan (capital of Jewish Autonomous Oblast) and 7,220 km from Moscow. Osinovka is the nearest rural locality.
