= Opytnoye Pole =

Opytnoye Pole Опытное Поле
- Selo
- Location within Jewish Autonomous Oblast Location within Russia
- Coordinates: 48°24′N 132°41′E
- Country: Russia
- Region: Jewish Autonomous Oblast
- District: Birobidzhansky District
- Time zone: UTC+10:00

Opytnoye Pole (Russian: Опытное Поле) is a rural locality (a selo) in Birobidzhansky District, Jewish Autonomous Oblast, Russia. Population: 173 (2010 census); 279 (2002 census); There are 6 streets in this selo.

== Geography ==
This rural locality is located 46 km from Birobidzhan (the district's administrative centre and capital of Jewish Autonomous Oblast) and 7,066 km from Moscow. Birofeld is the nearest rural locality.
