= Abramovka, Jewish Autonomous Oblast =

Abramovka Абрамовка
- Selo
- Location within Jewish Autonomous Oblast Location within Russia
- Coordinates: 48°59′N 131°29′E
- Country: Russia
- Region: Jewish Autonomous Oblast
- District: Obluchensky District

Population (2010)
  - Total: 1
- Time zone: [[UTC+10:00]]

Abramovka (Russian: Абрамовка) is a rural locality (a selo) in Izvestkovskoye Urban Settlement of Obluchensky District, Jewish Autonomous Oblast, Russia. The population was 1 as of 2010.

== Geography ==
The village is located on Trans-Siberian Railway, 52 km east of Obluchye (the district's administrative centre) by road. Snarsky is the nearest rural locality.
