= Ptichnik =

Ptichnik Птичник
- Selo
- Location within Jewish Autonomous Oblast Location within Russia
- Coordinates: 48°45′N 132°57′E
- Country: Russia
- Region: Jewish Autonomous Oblast
- District: Birobidzhansky District
- Time zone: UTC+10:00

Ptichnik (Russian: Птичник) is a rural locality (a selo) in Birobidzhansky District, Jewish Autonomous Oblast, Russia. Population: 3,194 (2010 census); 2,969 (2002 census); There are 34 streets in this selo.

== Geography ==
This rural locality is located 6 km from Birobidzhan (the district's administrative centre and capital of Jewish Autonomous Oblast) and 7,033 km from Moscow. Birobidzhan is the nearest rural locality.
