= Polevoye, Jewish Autonomous Oblast =

Polevoye Полевое
- Selo
- Location within Jewish Autonomous Oblast Location within Russia
- Coordinates: 47°50′N 131°15′E
- Country: Russia
- Region: Jewish Autonomous Oblast
- District: Oktyabrsky District
- Time zone: UTC+10:00

Polevoye (Russian: Полевое) is a rural locality (a selo) in Oktyabrsky District, Jewish Autonomous Oblast, Russia. Population: 691 (2010 census); 796 (2002 census); There are 13 streets in this selo.

== Geography ==
This rural locality is located 20 km from Amurzet (the district's administrative centre), 164 km from Birobidzhan (capital of Jewish Autonomous Oblast) and 7,043 km from Moscow. Samara is the nearest rural locality.
