= Dezhnyovka =

Dezhnyovka Дежнёвка
- Selo
- Location within Jewish Autonomous Oblast Location within Russia
- Coordinates: 48°31′N 134°41′E
- Country: Russia
- Region: Jewish Autonomous Oblast
- District: Smidovichsky District
- Time zone: UTC+10:00

Dezhnyovka (Russian: Дежнёвка) is a rural locality (a selo) in Smidovichsky District, Jewish Autonomous Oblast, Russia. Population: 46 (2010 census); 37 (2002 census);

== Geography ==
This rural locality is located 65 km from Smidovich (the district's administrative centre), 134 km from Birobidzhan (capital of Jewish Autonomous Oblast) and 7,194 km from Moscow. Klyuchevoye is the nearest rural locality.
