= Novoye, Jewish Autonomous Oblast =

Village in Leninsky District, Jewish Autonomous Oblast, Russia

Coordinates: 47°48′26″N 132°19′55″E

Novoye (Russian: Новое) is a rural locality (a selo) in Leninsky District of the Jewish Autonomous Oblast, Russia. According to the 2010 Census, its population was 683.

The village was established in 1869 as the khutor of Novinsky. It later became the settlement of Novy before being renamed as the selo of Novoye.
