= Leninsky District, Russia =

Leninsky District is the name of several administrative and municipal divisions in Russia. The districts are named after Vladimir Lenin, the founder of the Soviet state.

== Districts of the federal subjects ==
Federal subjects of Russia which have an entity called Leninsky District

Location of the federal city of Sevastopol on the Crimean Peninsula

- Leninsky District, Jewish Autonomous Oblast, an administrative and municipal district of the Jewish Autonomous Oblast
- Leninsky District, Moscow Oblast, an administrative and municipal district of Moscow Oblast
- Leninsky District, Tula Oblast, an administrative district of Tula Oblast
- Leninsky District, Volgograd Oblast, an administrative and municipal district of Volgograd Oblast
- Leninsky District, Republic of Crimea, a district in the Republic of Crimea (located on the Crimean Peninsula, which is disputed between Russia and Ukraine)
- Leninsky District, Sevastopol, an administrative district of the federal city of Sevastopol (located on the Crimean Peninsula, which is disputed between Russia and Ukraine)

== City divisions ==
1. Leninsky City District, Astrakhan, a city district of Astrakhan, the administrative center of Astrakhan Oblast
2. Leninsky City District, Barnaul, a city district of Barnaul, the administrative center of Altai Krai
3. Leninsky City District, Cheboksary, a city district of Cheboksary, the capital of the Chuvash Republic
4. Leninsky City District, Chelyabinsk, an administrative and municipal city district of Chelyabinsk, the administrative center of Chelyabinsk Oblast
5. Leninsky City District, Grozny, a city district of Grozny, the capital of the Chechen Republic
6. Leninsky City District, Irkutsk, a city district of Irkutsk, the administrative center of Irkutsk Oblast
7. Leninsky City District, Ivanovo, a city district of Ivanovo, the administrative center of Ivanovo Oblast
8. Leninsky City District, Izhevsk, a city district of Izhevsk, the capital of the Udmurt Republic
9. Leninsky Okrug, Kaluga, an okrug of the city of Kaluga, the administrative center of Kaluga Oblast
10. Leninsky City District, Kemerovo, a city district of Kemerovo, the administrative center of Kemerovo Oblast
11. Leninsky City District, Kirov, a city district of Kirov, the administrative center of Kirov Oblast
12. Leninsky City District, Krasnoyarsk, a city district of Krasnoyarsk, the administrative center of Krasnoyarsk Krai
13. Leninsky City District, Magnitogorsk, a city district of Magnitogorsk, a city in Chelyabinsk Oblast
14. Leninsky City District, Makhachkala, an administrative and municipal city district of Makhachkala, the capital of the Republic of Dagestan
15. Leninsky Administrative Okrug, Murmansk, an administrative okrug of the city of Murmansk, the administrative center of Murmansk Oblast
16. Leninsky City District, Nizhny Novgorod, a city district of Nizhny Novgorod, the administrative center of Nizhny Novgorod Oblast
17. Leninsky City District, Nizhny Tagil, a city district of Nizhny Tagil, a city in Sverdlovsk Oblast
18. Leninsky City District, Novosibirsk, a city district of Novosibirsk, the administrative center of Novosibirsk Oblast
19. Leninsky Administrative Okrug, Omsk, an administrative okrug of the city of Omsk, the administrative center of Omsk Oblast
20. Leninsky City District, Orenburg, a city district of Orenburg, the administrative center of Orenburg Oblast
21. Leninsky City District, Orsk, a city district of Orsk, a city in Orenburg Oblast
22. Leninsky City District, Penza, a city district of Penza, the administrative center of Penza Oblast
23. Leninsky City District, Perm, a city district of Perm, the administrative center of Perm Krai
24. Leninsky City District, Rostov-on-Don, a city district of Rostov-on-Don, the administrative center of Rostov Oblast
25. Leninsky City District, Samara, an administrative and municipal city district of Samara, the administrative center of Samara Oblast
26. Leninsky City District, Saransk, a city district of Saransk, the capital of the Republic of Mordovia
27. Leninsky City District, Saratov, a city district of Saratov, the administrative center of Saratov Oblast
28. Leninsky City District, Smolensk, a city district of Smolensk, the administrative center of Smolensk Oblast
29. Leninsky City District, Stavropol, a city district of Stavropol, the administrative center of Stavropol Krai
30. Leninsky City District, Tambov, a city district of Tambov, the administrative center of Tambov Oblast
31. Leninsky City District, Tomsk, a city district of Tomsk, the administrative center of Tomsk Oblast
32. Leninsky Administrative Okrug, Tyumen, an administrative okrug of the city of Tyumen, the administrative center of Tyumen Oblast
33. Leninsky City District, Ufa, a city district of Ufa, the capital of the Republic of Bashkortostan
34. Leninsky City District, Ulyanovsk, a city district of Ulyanovsk, the administrative center of Ulyanovsk Oblast
35. Leninsky City District, Vladimir, a city district of Vladimir, the administrative center of Vladimir Oblast
36. Leninsky City District, Vladivostok, a city district of Vladivostok, the administrative center of Primorsky Krai
37. Leninsky City District, Voronezh, a city district of Voronezh, the administrative center of Voronezh Oblast
38. Leninsky City District, Yaroslavl, a city district of Yaroslavl, the administrative center of Yaroslavl Oblast
39. Leninsky City District, Yekaterinburg, a city district of Yekaterinburg, the administrative center of Sverdlovsk Oblast
Cities in Russia with a city division called "Leninsky"

== Renamed districts ==
- Leninsky District, name of Karabudakhkentsky District of the Republic of Dagestan in 1962–1992
- Leninsky District, name of Nyurbinsky District of the Sakha Republic until 1992
- Leninsky District, name of Taldomsky District of Moscow Oblast in 1929—1930

== Historical districts ==
- Leninsky District, Kalinin Oblast, a district which existed in Western Oblast, Kalinin Oblast, and Velikiye Luki Oblast between 1927 and 1963.
- Leninsky District, Saint Petersburg, a district of the federal city of St. Petersburg; merged into the newly established Admiralteysky District in March 1994

== See also ==
- Leninsky (disambiguation)
- Leninsky Okrug (disambiguation)
