= Dubovoye, Jewish Autonomous Oblast =

Dubovoye Дубовое
- Selo
- Location within Jewish Autonomous Oblast Location within Russia
- Coordinates: 48°23′N 133°06′E
- Country: Russia
- Region: Jewish Autonomous Oblast
- District: Birobidzhansky District
- Time zone: UTC+10:00

Dubovoye (Russian: Дубовое) is a rural locality (a selo) in Birobidzhansky District, Jewish Autonomous Oblast, Russia. Population: 1,043 (2010 census); 1,231 (2002 census); There are 15 streets in this selo.

== Geography ==
This rural locality is located 46 km from Birobidzhan (the district's administrative centre and capital of Jewish Autonomous Oblast) and 7,098 km from Moscow. Petrovka is the nearest rural locality.
