= Kuldur =

Urban locality in Obluchensky District, Jewish Autonomous Oblast, Russia

Coordinates: 49°07′00″N 131°11′00″E

Kuldur (Russian: Кульдур; Yiddish: קולדור) is an urban locality (a resort settlement) in Obluchensky District of the Jewish Autonomous Oblast, Russia. Population: 1,609 (2010 census); 1,957 (2002 census); 4,132 (1989 Soviet census).
