= Nadezhda Birobidzhan =

Nadezhda
- City: Birobidzhan, Russia
- Founded: 1939; 86 years ago
- Home arena: Dalselmash Stadium

KhK Nadezhda (Russian: ХК Надежд) is a bandy club in Birobidzhan, Russia. The club was founded in 1939 and has been playing in the Russian Bandy Supreme League, the second tier of Russian bandy, with home games at Stadium Dalselmash in Birobidzhan, until the 2016–17 season. Building an indoor arena has been considered. However, in 2017–18 the team is not playing in the league, but non-professionally. The club colours are green and white.
