= Babstovo =

Babstovo Бабстово
- Selo
- Location within Jewish Autonomous Oblast Location within Russia
- Coordinates: 48°07′03″N 132°28′54″E
- Country: Russia
- Region: Jewish Autonomous Oblast
- District: Leninsky District

Population (2010)
  - Total: 4,465
- Time zone: UTC+10:00

Babstovo (Russian: Бабстово) is a rural locality (a selo) in Leninsky District of the Jewish Autonomous Oblast, Russia. According to the 2010 Census, its population was 4,465, of whom 3,075 (68.9%) were men and 1,390 (31.1%) women. Due to its proximity to the China–Russia border, Babstovo is the location of base of the 69th Covering Brigade of the Russian Ground Forces.

== History ==
The village was founded in 1863 as the stanitsa of Babstovskoye by Amur Cossack settlers of the 1st Company of the Amur Foot Cossack Battalion from Mikhailo-Semyonovskoye and Kukelevsky stanitsas in the same area, according to an 1893 account. Another contemporary account says that it was founded in 1865 and named after battalion commander Colonel A.K. Babst. By 1894 it included 55 houses, a chapel, a school with 28 students, and water and windmills. It was inhabited by Cossacks and had a population of 382, who primarily engaged in agriculture and hunting. By 1901, Babstovsky was part of the Mikhailo-Semyonovskoye stanitsa district. It had a population of 831 by 1917.

The administrative divisions of the region were reorganized in 1923 and Babstovskoye became part of Mikhailo-Semyonovskoye volost. In 1924 it had a population of 923. It was included in Blyukherovsky District (renamed from Mikhailo-Semyonovskoye) in 1934. From 1935 to 1945 the 100th Rifle Regiment and 34th Artillery Regiment of the 34th Rifle Division were based at Babstovo.

By 2002 it had a population of 380. The village included the village administration building, construction enterprises, the Birobidzhan Agricultural-Technical School, a post office, clinic, secondary school, primary school, kindergarten, House of Culture, and library as well as shops.
