= Blagoslovennoye =

Village in Jewish Autonomous Oblast, Russia

Coordinates: 47°46′05″N 131°22′58″E

Blagoslovennoye (Russian: Благословенное; Korean: 사만리; Hanja: 四萬里; RR: Samanri) is a rural locality (a selo) in Oktyabrsky District of the Jewish Autonomous Oblast, Russia. According to the 2010 Census, its population was 869.

The village was established in 1871 by Korean settlers who had fled from their country into Primorye due to famine and been resettled at Russian state expense in the southernmost, uninhabited portion of Amur Oblast, three versts from the northern bank of the Amur River. Blagoslovennoye remained populated by Koreans until 1937, when they were deported to Kazakhstan, like all Korean settlers in the Soviet Far East.
