= Danilovka, Jewish Autonomous Oblast =

Danilovka Даниловка
- Selo
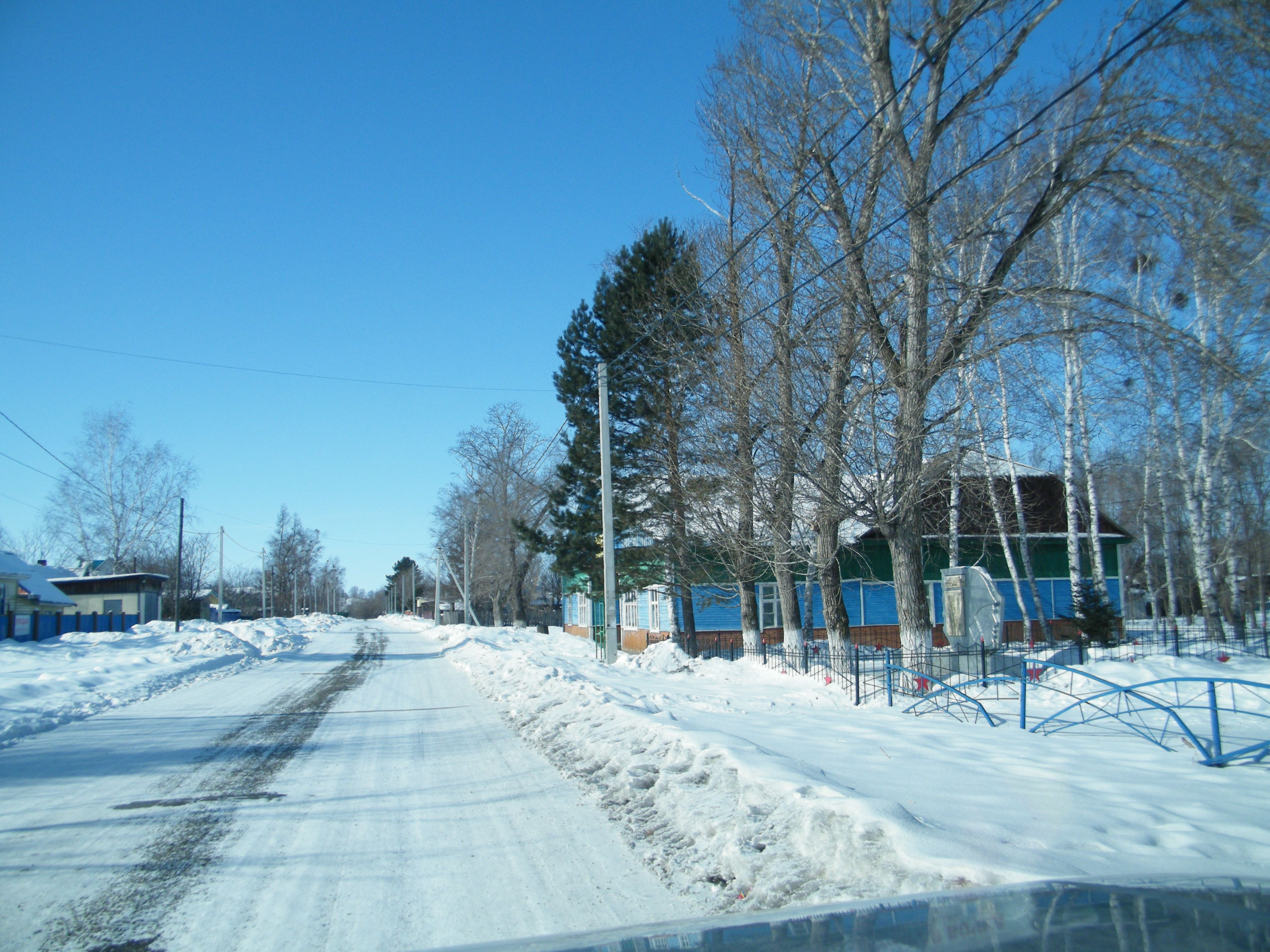

- Location within Jewish Autonomous Oblast Location within Russia
- Coordinates: 48°35′30″N 134°36′19″E
- Country: Russia
- Region: Jewish Autonomous Oblast
- District: Smidovichsky District

Population (2010)
  - Total: 858
- Time zone: UTC+10:00

Danilovka (Russian: Даниловка) is a village in Smidovichsky District of Jewish Autonomous Oblast, Russia.

== Geography ==
Danilovka stands on the right bank of the Tunguska. The road to the village of Danilovka goes north from the Volochayevka-2 railway station, the distance is about 4 km. Near the village there is the Komsomolsk–Dezhnyovka railway line; there is a railway bridge across the Tunguska.

== Infrastructure ==
The village has a post office, a kindergarten school, a feldsher-obstetric station, a library and a culture house. The main enterprise is the Danilovsky agricultural cooperative.
