= Sagibovo =

Sagibovo Сагибово
- Selo
- Location within Amur Oblast Location within Russia
- Coordinates: 48°54′N 130°23′E
- Country: Russia
- Region: Amur Oblast
- District: Arkharinsky District
- Time zone: UTC+9:00

Sagibovo (Russian: Сагибово) is a rural locality (a selo) in Kasatkinsky Selsoviet of Arkharinsky District, Amur Oblast, Russia. The population was 59 as of 2018. There is 1 street.

== Geography ==
Sagibovo is located on the left bank of the Amur River, 94 km southeast of Arkhara (the district's administrative centre) by road. Novopokrovka is the nearest rural locality.
