= Rucheyki =

Rucheyki Ручейки
- Selo
- Location within Vladimir Oblast Location within Russia
- Coordinates: 56°31′N 39°36′E
- Country: Russia
- Region: Vladimir Oblast
- District: Yuryev-Polsky District
- Time zone: UTC+3:00

Rucheyki (Russian: Ручейки) is a rural locality (a selo) in Krasnoselskoye Rural Settlement, Yuryev-Polsky District, Vladimir Oblast, Russia. The population was two inhabitants as of 2010.

== Geography ==
Rucheyki is located on the Koloksha River, seven km northwest from Yuryev-Polsky (the district's administrative centre) by road. Afineyevo is the nearest rural locality.
