= Volochayevka-1 =

Village in Smidovichsky District, Russia

Coordinates: 48°33′50″N 134°29′00″E

Volochayevka-1 is a rural locality (a (selo) in Smidovichsky District of the Jewish Autonomous Oblast, Russia. Population: 1,148 (2010 census);
