= Amurzet =

Amurzet Амурзет
- Rural locality
- Interactive map of Amurzet
- Location of Amurzet Amurzet (Jewish Autonomous Oblast)
- Coordinates: 47°41′48″N 131°05′53″E
- Country: Russia
- Federal subject: Jewish Autonomous Oblast
- Founded: 1928
- Elevation: 70 m (230 ft)

Population
  - Estimate (2021): 3,953 )
- Time zone: UTC+10 (MSK+7)
- Postal code: 679230
- OKTMO ID: 99625405101

Amurzet (Russian: Амурзет; Yiddish: אמורזעט) is a rural locality (a selo) and the administrative center of Oktyabrsky District of the Jewish Autonomous Oblast, Russia, located 250 kilometers (160 mi) from Birobidzhan. Population: 5,051 (2010 census); 5,382 (2002 census); 6,243 (1989 Soviet census).

== History ==
It was founded in 1929 as a large collective farm. Specifically, Amurzet has a history of Jewish settlement in the JAO since its inception. Concerning the period 1929 through 1939, Amurzet was the center of Jewish settlement for the area south of Birobidzhan.

== Jewish community ==
The present day Jewish community members hold Kabalat Shabbat ceremonies and gatherings that feature songs in Yiddish, Jewish cuisine, and discussions on Jewish culture. Today, many descendants of the founders of this settlement have left their native village, while others remain. Present day inhabitants of Amurzet, especially those having relatives in Israel, are learning more about the traditions and roots of the Jewish people and religion.

== See also ==
- History of the Jews in the Jewish Autonomous Oblast
