= Birobidzhansky District =

Birobidzhansky District Биробиджанский район (Russian)
- District

Other transcription(s)
  - Yiddish: ביראָבידזשאַן סקי דיסטריקט
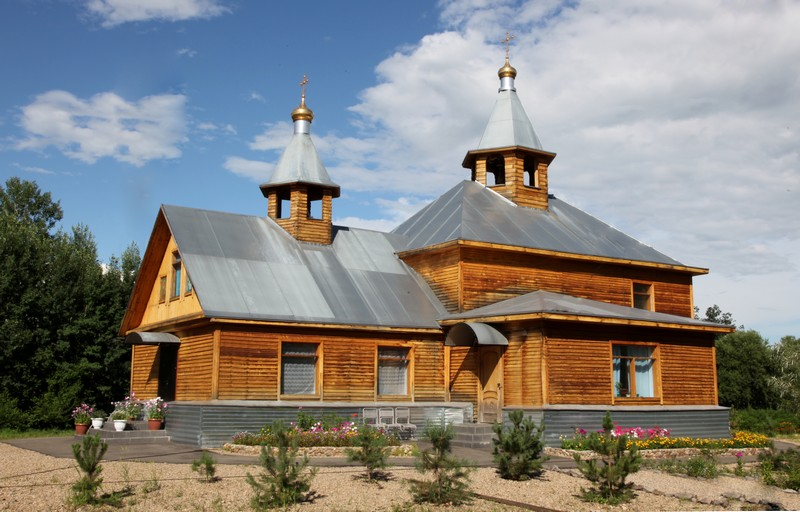
- Convent of St. Innocent, village of Razdolnoye, Birobidzhansky District

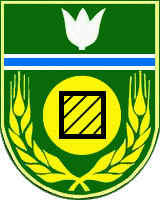
- Coat of arms
- Location of Birobidzhansky District in the Jewish Autonomous Oblast
- Coordinates: 48°47′N 132°56′E
- Country: Russia
- Federal subject: Jewish Autonomous Oblast
- Established: 1934
- Administrative center: Birobidzhan

Area
  - Total: 4,442.56 km^{2} (1,715.28 sq mi)

Population (2010 Census)
  - Total: 11,907
  - Density: 2.6802/km^{2} (6.9417/sq mi)
  - Urban: 0%
  - Rural: 100%

Administrative structure
  - Inhabited localities: 20 rural localities

Municipal structure
  - Municipally incorporated as: Birobidzhansky Municipal District
  - Municipal divisions: 0 urban settlements, 6 rural settlements
- Time zone: UTC+10 (MSK+7)
- OKTMO ID: 99605000
- Website: http://br.eao.ru/

Birobidzhansky District (Russian: Биробиджа́нский райо́н, Yiddish: ביראָבידזשאַן סקי דיסטריקט) is an administrative and municipal district (raion), one of the five in the Jewish Autonomous Oblast, Russia. It is located in the center of the autonomous oblast. The area of the district is 4,442.56 square kilometers (1,715.28 sq mi). Its administrative center is the town of Birobidzhan (which is not administratively a part of the district). Population: 11,907 (2010 Census); 13,018 (2002 census); 15,437 (1989 Soviet census).

== Geography ==
Birobidzhansky District is located in the central of the Jewish Autonomous Oblast. The main river in the district is the Bira River, which runs north-to-south through the district. About 20 km of the Amur River runs along the southern border of Birobidzhansky. The district is about 125 km west of the city of Khabarovsk, and the area measures 90 km (north-south) by 70 km (west-east). The administrative center, Birobidzhan, straddles the Bira River in the north but is not administratively part of the district. Bira River valley of the district is surrounded by foothills of the Lesser Khingan mountains. the area has deposits of brown coal and peat.

The district is bordered on the north and west by Obluchensky District, on the east by Smidovichsky District, on the south by Leninsky District, Jewish Autonomous Oblast and a short border with China.

== History ==
Officially, the area had come under control of Russia in 1858 after the Treaty of Aigun with China. The treaty set the Amur River as border between the two countries. Settlers began drifting in, mostly from the Trans-Baikal area, over the following years. The village of Golovino reaching a population of 400 by the year 1891, with a school, a post office, and a chapel. Another wave of population growth came in 1890–1910 with the construction of the Trans-Siberian Railway and the Amur Cart Road; these migrants were mostly from Central Russia and Volga regions. New villages spread north from the Amur along the Bira River.

The first large migration of Jews began in the 1920s, who founded at least half a dozen villages in the district. They established an Experimental Farm (later the Research Institute of Agriculture) to develop farming practices more appropriate to the area, as the heavy summer rains interfered with harvests and the soils and climate were different from European Russia. Until the 1930s, there were few roads and transportation centered on a 60-horsepower steamer that worked up and down the Bira from the Amur to the town of Birobidzhan. Good roads did not begin to appear until the 1950s-1960s.

The current district administration was formed in 1942 as the area was growing in importance and was supplying food to the war effort. At the time, there were 5,883 people in the district, on 1683 farms and 12 collectives. Late in 1942, the village of Valdgame contributed 250,000 rubles to support the squadron "Jewish Farmer". Agriculture improved in the post-war years with the introduction of fertilizers, pesticides, and crop rotation.

== Administrative and municipal status ==
Within the framework of administrative divisions, Birobidzhansky District is one of the five in the autonomous oblast. The town of Birobidzhan serves as its administrative center, despite being incorporated separately as a town of oblast significance—an administrative unit with the status equal to that of the districts.

As a municipal division, the district is incorporated as Birobidzhansky Municipal District. The town of oblast significance of Birobidzhan is incorporated separately from the district as Birobidzhan Urban Okrug.
