= Oktyabrsky District, Jewish Autonomous Oblast =

Oktyabrsky District Октябрьский район (Russian)
- District
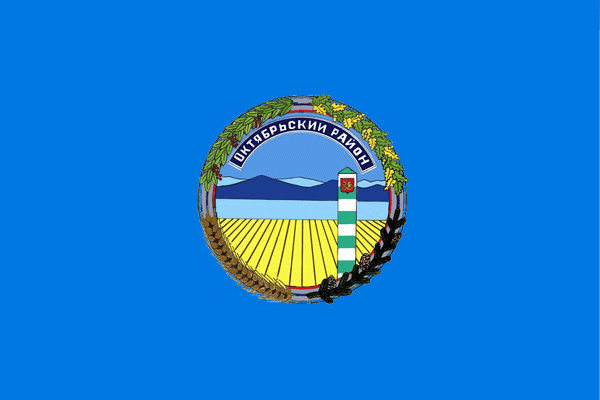
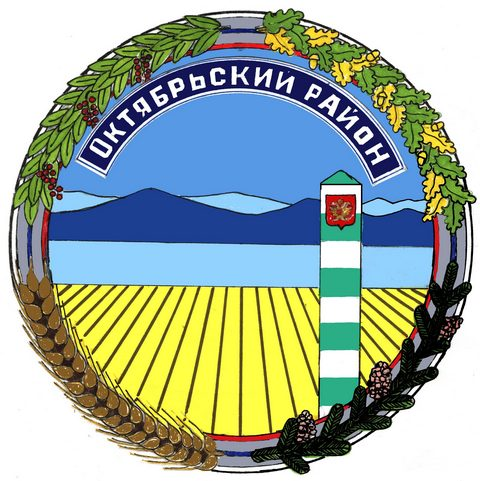
- Flag Coat of arms
- Location of Oktyabrsky District in the Jewish Autonomous Oblast
- Coordinates: 47°41′48″N 131°05′53″E
- Country: Russia
- Federal subject: Jewish Autonomous Oblast
- Established: 1934
- Administrative center: Amurzet

Area
  - Total: 6,400 km^{2} (2,500 sq mi)

Population (2010 Census)
  - Total: 11,354
  - Density: 1.8/km^{2} (4.6/sq mi)
  - Urban: 0%
  - Rural: 100%

Administrative structure
  - Inhabited localities: 15 rural localities

Municipal structure
  - Municipally incorporated as: Oktyabrsky Municipal District
  - Municipal divisions: 0 urban settlements, 3 rural settlements
- Time zone: UTC+10 (MSK+7)
- OKTMO ID: 99625000
- Website: http://www.okt.eao.ru/

Oktyabrsky District (Russian: Октя́брьский райо́н) is an administrative and municipal district (raion), one of the five in the Jewish Autonomous Oblast, Russia. It is located in the west and southwest of the autonomous oblast. The area of the district is 6,400 square kilometers (2,500 sq mi). Its administrative center is the rural locality (a selo) of Amurzet. Population: 11,354 (2010 Census); 13,095 (2002 census); 15,599 (1989 Soviet census). The population of Amurzet accounts for 44.5% of the district's total population.
