= Leninskoye, Jewish Autonomous Oblast =

Village in Leninsky District, Jewish Autonomous Oblast, Russia

Coordinates: 47°56′30″N 132°37′05″E

Leninskoye is a rural locality (a (selo) and the administrative center of Leninsky District of the Jewish Autonomous Oblast, Russia. Population: 6,109 (2010 census); 7,048 (2002 census); 6,707 (1989 Soviet census).
