= Leninsky District, Jewish Autonomous Oblast =

Leninsky District Ленинский район (Russian)
- District
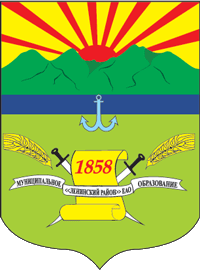
- Coat of arms
- Location of Leninsky District in the Jewish Autonomous Oblast
- Coordinates: 47°56′30″N 132°37′05″E
- Country: Russia
- Federal subject: Jewish Autonomous Oblast
- Established: 1934
- Administrative center: Leninskoye

Area
  - Total: 6,068 km^{2} (2,343 sq mi)

Population (2010 Census)
  - Total: 20,684
  - Density: 3.409/km^{2} (8.828/sq mi)
  - Urban: 0%
  - Rural: 100%

Administrative structure
  - Inhabited localities: 24 rural localities

Municipal structure
  - Municipally incorporated as: Leninsky Municipal District
  - Municipal divisions: 0 urban settlements, 5 rural settlements
- Time zone: UTC+10 (MSK+7)
- OKTMO ID: 99610000
- Website: http://leninsk.eao.ru/

Leninsky District (Russian: Ле́нинский райо́н) is an administrative and municipal district (raion), one of the five in the Jewish Autonomous Oblast, Russia. It is located in the south and center of the autonomous oblast. The area of the district is 6,068 square kilometers (2,343 sq mi). Its administrative center is the rural locality (a selo) of Leninskoye. Population: 20,684 (2010 Census); 22,844 (2002 census); 28,464 (1989 Soviet census). The population of Leninskoye accounts for 29.5% of the district's total population.

== Geography ==
Leninsky District is located in the south central region of the Jewish Autonomous Oblast. About 132 km of the Amur River runs along the southern border of Leninsky. The district is about 160 km west of the city of Khabarovsk, and the area measures 90 km (north-south) by 100 km (west-east). About 60% of the district is on the Middle Plain of the Amur River, with the remainder on the northern foothills of the Lesser Khingan mountains. The area has commercial deposits of building materials: granite, sandstone, clay and gravel.

The district is bordered on the north by Obluchensky District, on the west by Oktyabrsky District, on the east by Birobidzhansky District, on the south across the Amur is China.

== History ==
After the area came under the official control of Russia in 1858, after the Treaty of Aigun with China, the Russian government resettled Trans-Baikal Cossacks into the district to provide a military presence. Volunteers were insufficient, so settlers were selected by lot and relocated down the Amur River on rafts with their families. District was officially constituted in 1934.
