= Smidovich =

Coordinates: 48°35′45″N 133°48′15″E

Smidovich (Russian: Смидович; Yiddish: סמידאוויטש) is an urban locality (an urban-type settlement) and the administrative center of Smidovichsky District of the Jewish Autonomous Oblast, Russia. Population: 5,120 (2010 census); 5,905 (2002 census); 6,646 (1989 Soviet census).

== History ==
It is an early Jewish settlement, which was founded in 1928 named after Pyotr Smidovich who, along with Mikhail Kalinin, came up with the idea to found the Jewish Autonomous Oblast.

== Climate ==
Like most of the Amur Basin, Smidovich has an extreme humid continental climate (Köppen Dwb), featuring very warm and rainy summers contrasting with frigid and very dry winters.

Climate data for Smidovich
Month	Jan	Feb	Mar	Apr	May	Jun	Jul	Aug	Sep	Oct	Nov	Dec	Year
Mean daily maximum °C (°F)	−17.9 (−0.2)	−12.4 (9.7)	−1.5 (29.3)	10.1 (50.2)	18.7 (65.7)	24.5 (76.1)	27 (81)	24.7 (76.5)	18.6 (65.5)	9.3 (48.7)	−4.6 (23.7)	−15.5 (4.1)	6.8 (44.2)
Daily mean °C (°F)	−22.7 (−8.9)	−18.3 (−0.9)	−7.7 (18.1)	4.3 (39.7)	12.1 (53.8)	18.2 (64.8)	21.4 (70.5)	19.6 (67.3)	13.2 (55.8)	4.1 (39.4)	−9.1 (15.6)	−19.8 (−3.6)	1.3 (34.3)
Mean daily minimum °C (°F)	−27.5 (−17.5)	−24.2 (−11.6)	−13.8 (7.2)	−1.5 (29.3)	5.5 (41.9)	11.9 (53.4)	15.9 (60.6)	14.6 (58.3)	7.9 (46.2)	−1 (30)	−13.6 (7.5)	−24.1 (−11.4)	−4.2 (24.5)
Average precipitation mm (inches)	9 (0.4)	8 (0.3)	16 (0.6)	40 (1.6)	56 (2.2)	92 (3.6)	135 (5.3)	141 (5.6)	89 (3.5)	42 (1.7)	20 (0.8)	14 (0.6)	662 (26.2)
Source: Climate-Data.org

== Sport ==
The bandy club Urozhay played in the Russian Bandy Supreme League, the second highest division, until 2015–16. Its home arena was the Lokomotiv Stadium.

== See also ==
- History of the Jews in the Jewish Autonomous Oblast
