= Smidovichsky District =

Smidovichsky District Смидовичский район (Russian)
- District
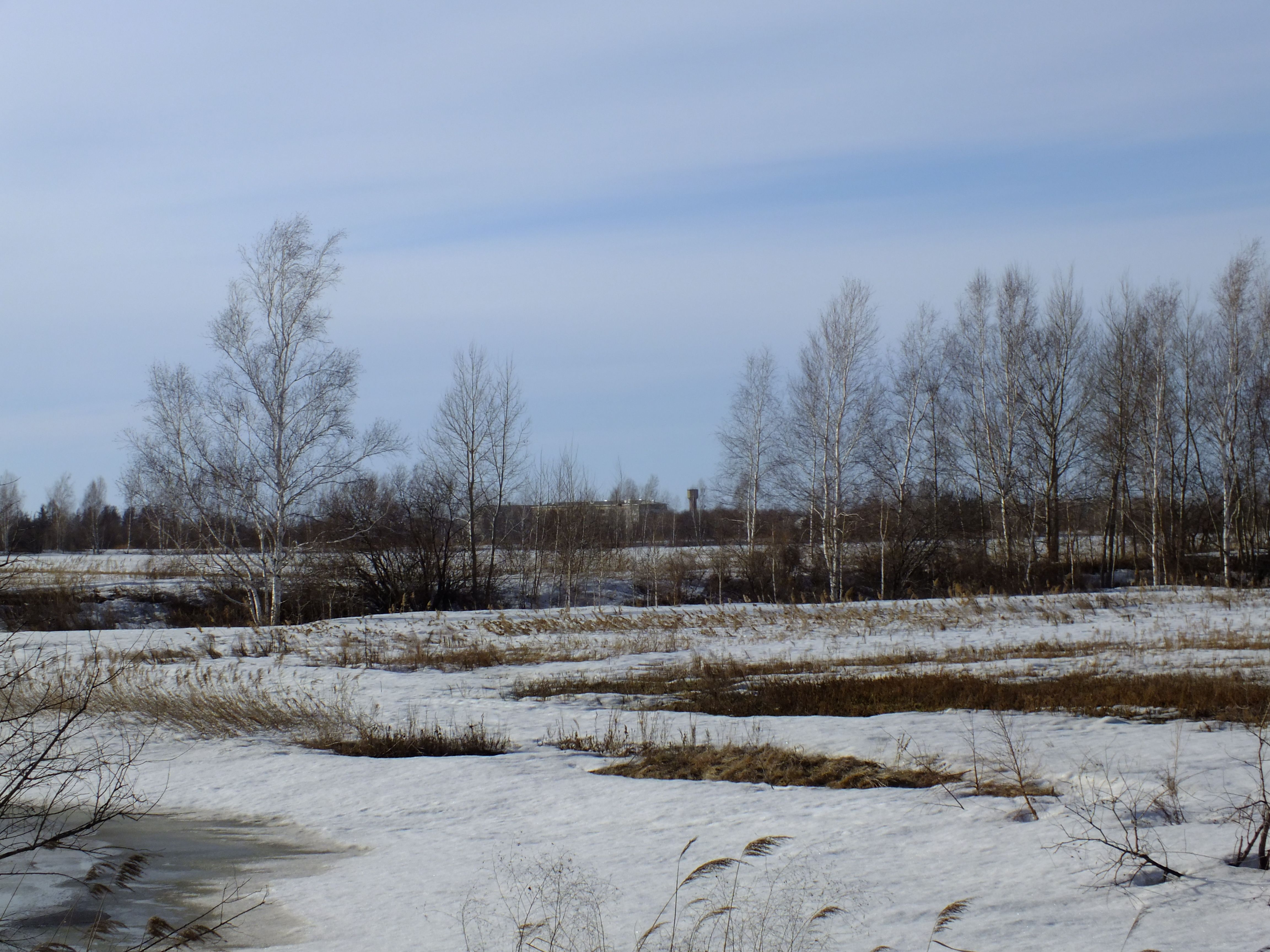
- Landscape of Smidovichsky District, with the settlement of Volochayevka-2 visible on the horizon

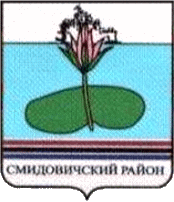
- Coat of arms
- Location of Smidovichsky District in the Jewish Autonomous Oblast
- Coordinates: 48°36′N 133°48′E
- Country: Russia
- Federal subject: Jewish Autonomous Oblast
- Established: 1934
- Administrative center: Smidovich

Area
  - Total: 5,900 km^{2} (2,300 sq mi)

Population (2010 Census)
  - Total: 28,165
  - Density: 4.8/km^{2} (12/sq mi)
  - Urban: 67.5%
  - Rural: 32.5%

Administrative structure
  - Inhabited localities: 4 urban-type settlements, 21 rural localities

Municipal structure
  - Municipally incorporated as: Smidovichsky Municipal District
  - Municipal divisions: 4 urban settlements, 2 rural settlements
- Time zone: UTC+10 (MSK+7)
- OKTMO ID: 99630000
- Website: http://smid.eao.ru

Population of Smidovichsky District
- 2010 Census: 28,165
- 2002 Census: 28,193
- 1989 Census: 29,708
- 1979 Census: 28,114

Smidovichsky District (Russian: Смидо́вичский райо́н) is an administrative and municipal district (raion), one of the five in the Jewish Autonomous Oblast, Russia. It is located in the east of the autonomous oblast and borders Khabarovsk Krai (via the Tunguska River) in the north and east, China (via the Amur River) in the south, and Birobidzhansky District in the west. The area of the district is 5,900 square kilometers (2,300 sq mi). Its administrative center is the urban locality (a settlement) of Smidovich. As of the 2010 Census, the total population of the district was 28,165, with the population of Smidovich accounting for 18.2% of that number.

== Geography ==
The district stretches for 50 kilometers (31 mi) from north to south and for 125 kilometers (78 mi) from west to east. The terrain is low river plain, with the Amur and Tunguska Rivers wide and meandering along the district borders. Immediately to the east of the district is the city of Khabarovsk.

The climate is suited to agriculture, supporting buckwheat, corn, wheat, and vegetables.

== Transportation ==
The Trans-Siberian Railway runs across northern length of the district, as does the Amur Highway (R297) from Chita to Khabarovsk.
