= Obluchye, Jewish Autonomous Oblast =

Obluchye Облучье אָבלוטשיע (Yiddish)
- Town
- Interactive map of Obluchye
- Location of Obluchye Obluchye (Jewish Autonomous Oblast)
- Coordinates: 49°01′N 131°03′E
- Country: Russia
- Federal subject: Jewish Autonomous Oblast
- Administrative district: Obluchensky District
- Founded: 1911
- Town status since: 1938
- Elevation: 270 m (890 ft)

Population (2010 Census)
  - Total: 9,379
  - Estimate (2023): 7,831 (−16.5%)

Administrative status
  - Capital of: Obluchensky District

Municipal status
  - Municipal district: Obluchensky Municipal District
  - Urban settlement: Obluchenskoye Urban Settlement
  - Capital of: Obluchensky Municipal District, Obluchenskoye Urban Settlement
- Time zone: UTC+10 (MSK+7)
- Postal codes: 679100, 679102, 679104, 679109
- Dialing code: +7 42666
- OKTMO ID: 99620101001

Obluchye (Russian: Облу́чье, Yiddish: אָבלוטשיע, romanized: oblutshye) is a town and the administrative center of Obluchensky District in the Jewish Autonomous Oblast, Russia, located on the Khingan River, 159 kilometers (99 mi) west of Birobidzhan, the administrative center of the autonomous oblast. Population: 7,959 (2021 census); 9,379 (2010 census); 11,069 (2002 census); 12,016 (1989 Soviet census).

== History ==
Construction on a section of the Trans-Siberian Railway connecting Chita and Vladivostok began in 1898, starting at each end and meeting halfway. The project produced a large influx of new settlers and in 1911 a village was founded around the Obluchye railway station, the name of which roughly means the route passing around as the railway at this point travels through a large curve around the mountains.

The railway was completed in October 1916.

Town status was granted to Obluchye in 1938.

== Administrative and municipal status ==
Within the framework of administrative divisions, Obluchye serves as the administrative center of Obluchensky District, to which it is directly subordinated. As a municipal division, the town of Obluchye, together with five rural localities in Obluchensky District, is incorporated within Obluchensky Municipal District as Obluchenskoye Urban Settlement.

== Economy ==
The gold mining company Zoloto Zutary is based in the town. Other employers include the railway workshops connected to the town's station on the Trans-Siberian Railway.
