= Obluchensky District =

Obluchensky District Облученский район (Russian)
- District
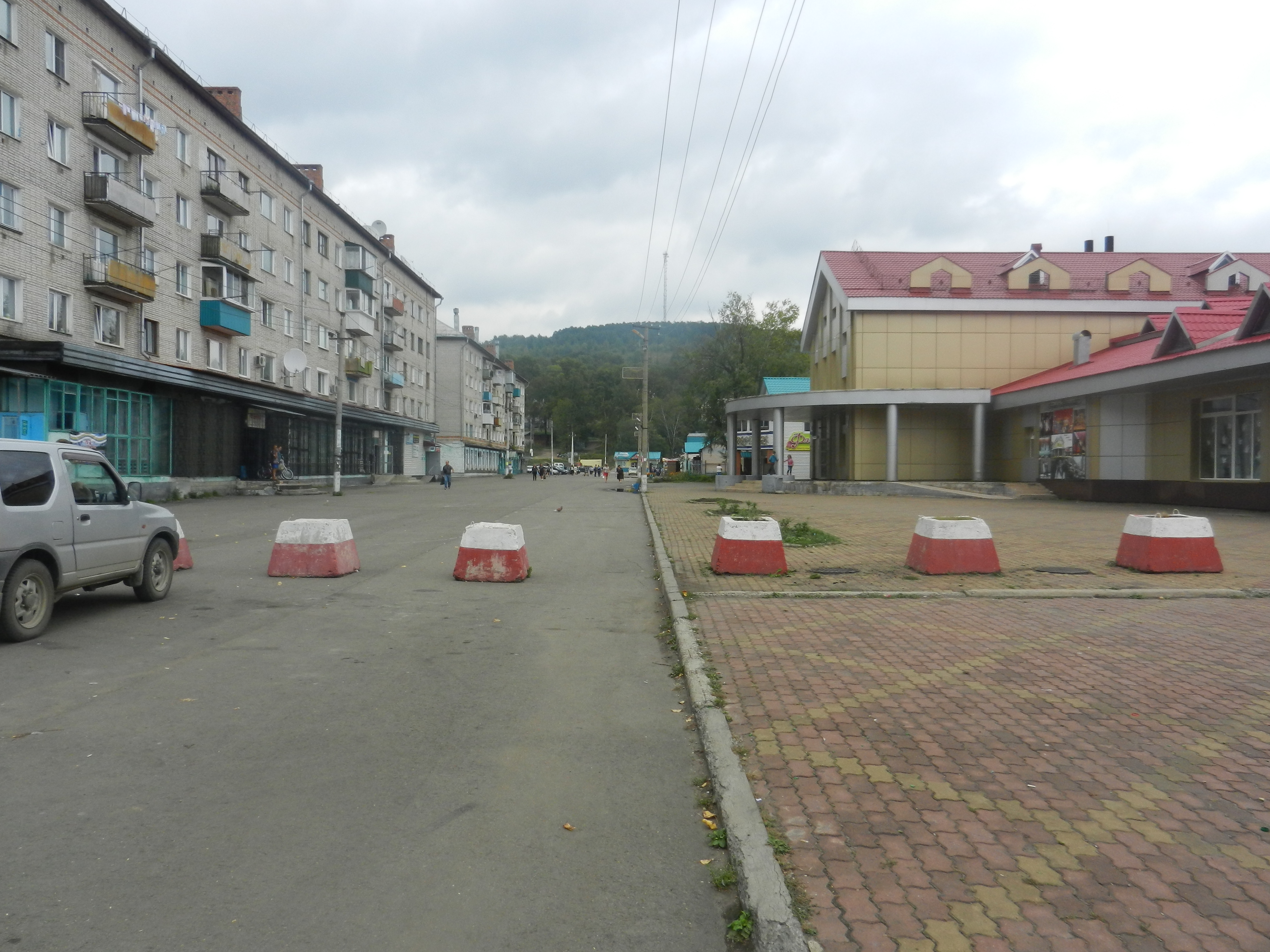
- Obluch'e town, Obluchensky District

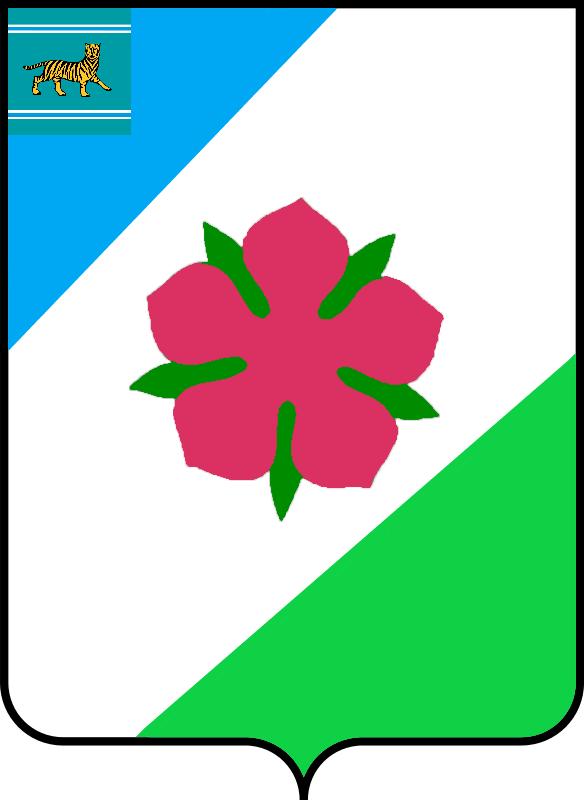
- Coat of arms
- Location of Obluchensky District in the Jewish Autonomous Oblast
- Coordinates: 49°00′N 131°03′E
- Country: Russia
- Federal subject: Jewish Autonomous Oblast
- Established: 1945
- Administrative center: Obluchye

Area
  - Total: 13,300 km^{2} (5,100 sq mi)

Population (2010 Census)
  - Total: 29,035
  - Density: 2.18/km^{2} (5.65/sq mi)
  - Urban: 85.9%
  - Rural: 14.1%

Administrative structure
  - Inhabited localities: 1 cities/towns, 7 urban-type settlements, 19 rural localities

Municipal structure
  - Municipally incorporated as: Obluchensky Municipal District
  - Municipal divisions: 6 urban settlements, 1 rural settlements
- Time zone: UTC+10 (MSK+7)
- OKTMO ID: 99620000
- Website: http://obl-raion.ru/

Obluchensky District (Russian: Облученский райо́н; yiddish: אבלוטשיער ראיאן Oblutshyer raion) is an administrative and municipal district (raion), one of the five in the Jewish Autonomous Oblast, Russia. It is located in the north, east, and center of the autonomous oblast. The area of the district is 13,300 square kilometers (5,100 sq mi). Its administrative center is the town of Obluchye. Population: 29,035 (2010 Census); 36,515 (2002 census); 43,062 (1989 Soviet census). The population of Obluchye accounts for 32.3% of the district's total population.

== Geography ==
Obluchensky District is located in the northwest region of the Jewish Autonomous Oblast; it is the largest district in the oblast. About 50 km of the Amur River runs along the western border of Obluchensky. The district is dominated by mountain ranges such as the Bureya Range with 1,421 metres (4,662 ft) high Mount Studencheskaya, the highest point of the oblast, and the Lesser Khingan, through which flow the upper and middle reaches of the Bira River. The Bira basin runs west-to-east through the middle of the district, and is relatively narrow. Most of the larger towns of the district are along the Bira. The southeastern area of the district lies on the lowlands and plains of the Amur itself. The district is about 150 km west of the city of Khabarovsk, and the area measures 90 km (north-south) by 190 km (west-east). The Bastak Nature Reserve is located in Obluchensky and Biroidzhansky Districts.

The district is bordered on the north and east by Khabarovsk Krai, on the west by China across the Amur, and on the south by Birobidzhansky District, Leninsky District, and Oktyabrsky District.
