= Birobidzhan =

Administrative centre and town in Russia

Birobidzhan Биробиджан
- Town

Other transcription(s)
  - Yiddish: ביראָבידזשאַן
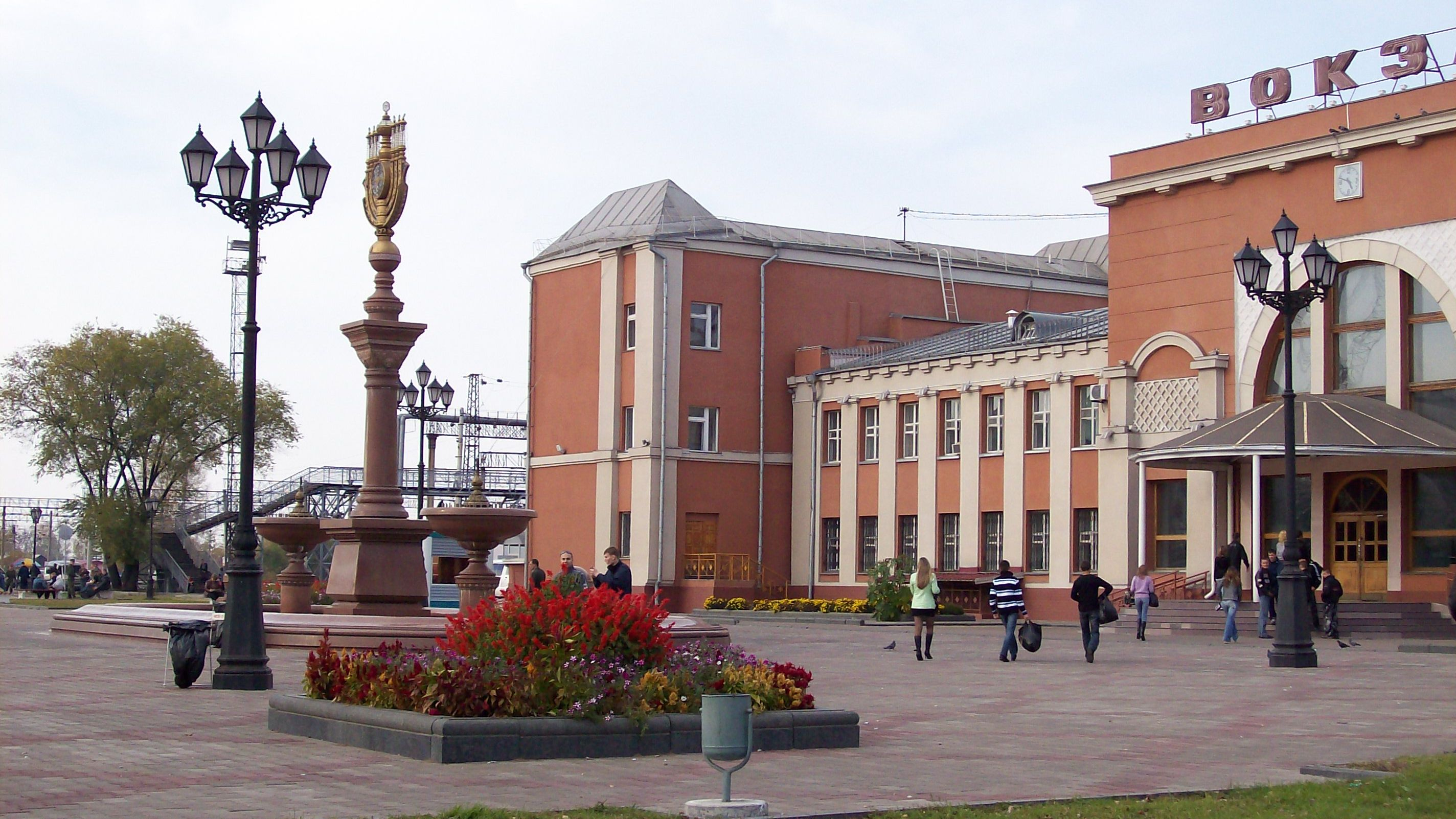
- Birobidzhan railway station

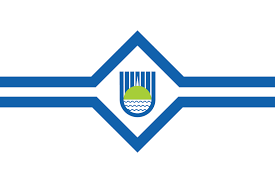
- Flag Coat of arms
- Interactive map of Birobidzhan
- Location of Birobidzhan Birobidzhan (Jewish Autonomous Oblast)
- Coordinates: 48°48′N 132°56′E
- Country: Russia
- Federal subject: Jewish Autonomous Oblast
- Founded: 1931
- Town status since: 1937

Government
  - Body: Town Duma
  - Mayor: Aleksandr Golovaty

Area
  - Total: 169.38 km^{2} (65.40 sq mi)
- Elevation: 80 m (260 ft)

Population (2010 Census)
  - Total: 75,413
  - Estimate (2025): 74,791 (−0.8%)
  - Rank: 215th in 2010
  - Density: 445.23/km^{2} (1,153.1/sq mi)

Administrative status
  - Subordinated to: town of oblast significance of Birobidzhan
  - Capital of: Jewish Autonomous Oblast, Birobidzhansky District

Municipal status
  - Urban okrug: Birobidzhan Urban Okrug
  - Capital of: Birobidzhan Urban Okrug, Birobidzhansky Municipal District
- Time zone: UTC+10 (MSK+7)
- Postal codes: 679000, 679002, 679005, 679006, 679011, 679013–679017, 679700, 679801, 679950
- Dialing code: +7 42622
- OKTMO ID: 99701000001
- Town Day: Last Saturday of May
- Website: www.biradm.ru

Birobidzhan (Russian: Биробиджан, IPA: [bʲɪrəbʲɪˈdʐan]; Yiddish: ביראָבידזשאַן, IPA: [ˌbɪrɔbɪˈdʒan]), also spelt Birobijan (/ˌbɪrəbɪˈdʒɑːn/ BIRR-ə-bih-JAHN), is a town and the administrative centre of the Jewish Autonomous Oblast, Russia, located on the Trans-Siberian Railway, near the China–Russia border.

As of the 2010 Census, its population is 75,413. Birobidzhan is named after the two largest rivers in the autonomous oblast: the Bira and the Bidzhan. The Bira, which lies to the east of the Bidzhan Valley, flows through the town. Both rivers are tributaries of the Amur.

Historical population
Year	Pop.	±%
1926	831	—
1939	29,648	+3467.7%
1959	40,667	+37.2%
1970	55,724	+37.0%
1979	68,630	+23.2%
1989	83,667	+21.9%
2002	77,250	−7.7%
2010	75,413	−2.4%
2021	68,536	−9.1%
Source: Census data

== History ==
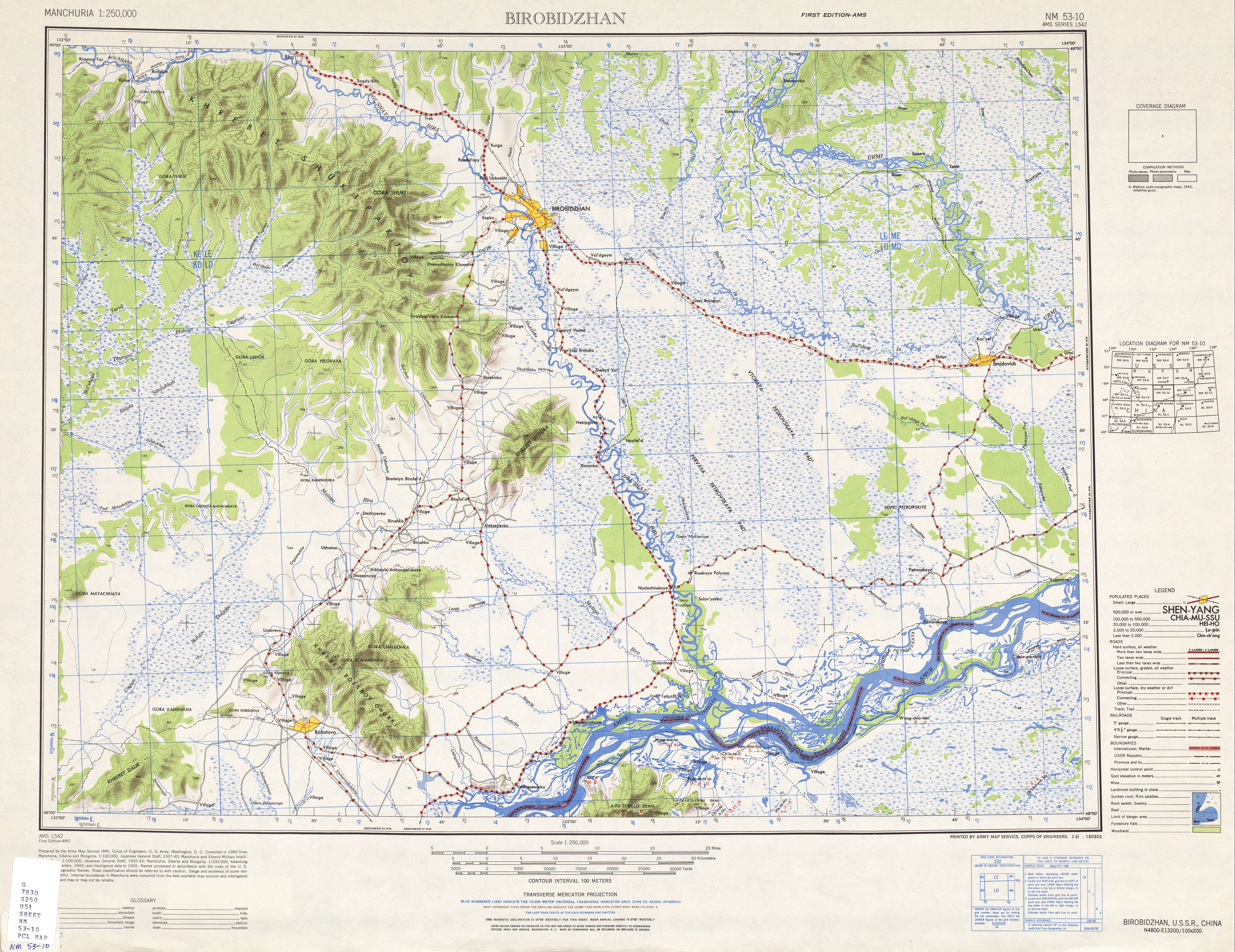
Birobidzhan (1950)

Built on the site of an earlier village called Tikhonka, Birobidzhan was planned by the Swiss architect Hannes Meyer, and established in 1931. It became the administrative centre of the Jewish Autonomous Oblast in 1934, and town status was granted to it in 1937. The 36,000 km^{2} area of Birobidzhan was approved by the Politburo on March 28, 1928. After the Bolshevik revolution, the Soviet government set up two organisations that worked with the settlement of Jews into Birobidzhan, the KOMZET and OZET. These organisations were responsible for the distribution of land as well as domestic responsibilities, ranging from moving to medical assistance. Many Jewish Canadians then gave their support to the Soviet Union by becoming either members or sympathisers with the Communist Party of Canada.

Jewish communists believed that the Soviet Union's creation of Birobidzhan was the "only true and sensible solution to the national question." The Soviet government used the slogan "To the Jewish Homeland!" to encourage Jewish workers to move to Birobidzhan. The slogan proved successful in convincing Soviet Jews as well as Jews from other countries to move to the city. In 1935, Ambijan received permission from the Soviet government to aid Jewish families travelling to Birobidzhan from Poland, Romania, Lithuania and Germany. Jewish workers and engineers travelled to Birobidzhan from Argentina and the United States as well. This campaign by the Soviet government was known as the Birobidzhan Experiment.

=== Factors behind the Birobidzhan Experiment ===
Although Birobidzhan was meant to serve as a home for the Jewish population, the authorities struggled to turn the idea into a reality. There were no important cultural connections between the land and the Jewish settlers. The growing population was culturally diverse, with some settlers focused on being modern Russian citizens, some disillusioned by modern cultures with a desire to work the land and promote socialist ideals, with few interested in establishing a cultural homeland. Ulterior motives generated by the Soviet government were the primary reasons for Jewish people to relocate to Birobidzhan. The placement of the Jews in Birobidzhan was meant to serve as a buffer to dissuade any Chinese or Japanese expansion. The region was also a link between the Trans-Siberian Railroad and the Amur River Valley, and the Soviet government sought to exploit the natural resources of the area, such as fish, timber, iron, tin, and gold.

=== Complications during the Experiment ===
Before the Russian Revolution of 1917, residence for Jews was restricted to the Pale of Settlement. As Jews relocated to Birobidzhan, they had to compete with the approximately 27,000 Russians, Cossacks, Koreans, and Ukrainians already residing there for property and land to develop new homes. This complicated the transition for the Jewish population, as there was no significant area to claim as their own.

Logistically and practically, settling Birobidzhan proved to be difficult. Due to inadequate infrastructure and the weather conditions of the area, more than half the Jewish settlers who relocated to Birobidzhan after the initial settlement did not remain.

When the Stalinist purges began, shortly after the creation of Birobidzhan, Jews there were targeted. Following World War II, tens of thousands of displaced Eastern European Jews found their way to Birobidzhan from 1946 to 1948. Some were Ukrainian and Belarusian Jews who were not allowed to return to their original homes. However, Jews were once again targeted in the wake of World War II when Joseph Stalin embarked on a campaign against "rootless cosmopolitans". Nearly all the Yiddish institutions of Birobidzhan were liquidated.

=== Notable supporters of Birobidzhan ===
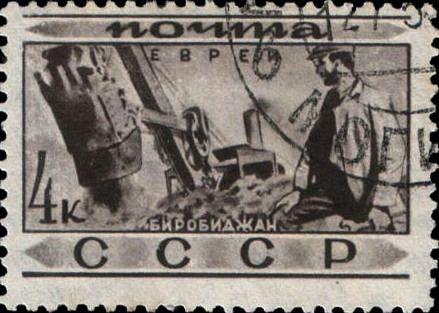
Jews of Birobidzhan in a 1933 "Peoples of the Soviet Union" postage stamp

Among Birobidzhan's proponents was Dudley Aman, 1st Baron Marley. After Lord Marley met Peter Smidovich and Jacob Tsegelnitski in August 1932, Marley became a proponent of Birobidzhan as a new homeland for Jewish workers and refugees. His visit to Birobidzhan in October 1933 was organised by Smidovich himself. Marley's assessment of the area was positive, and he became a more avid supporter of the settlement of Birobidzhan.

Yiddish writer David Bergelson played a large part in promoting Birobidzhan, although he himself did not settle there permanently. Bergelson wrote articles in the Yiddish language newspapers in other countries extolling the region as an ideal escape from antisemitism elsewhere. At least 1,000 families from the United States and Latin America came to Birobidzhan because of Bergelson. On his 68th birthday in 1952, Bergelson was among those executed during Stalin's antisemitic campaign against "rootless cosmopolitans" following the establishment of the state of Israel in 1948.

In the Russian language play Novaia rodina (New Homeland) by the Soviet playwright Victor Fink celebrated Birobidzhan as the coming together of three communities – the Koreans, the Amur Cossacks and the Jews. Each community has its own good and bad characters, but ultimately the good characters from each community learnt to cooperate and work with each other. To symbolise the unity achieved, the play ends with mixed marriages with one Jewish character marrying a Korean, another Jewish character marrying a Cossack and a Cossack marrying a Korean. Likewise, the Soviet Yiddish writer Emmanuil Kazakevich portrayed in a poem the achievement of Birobidzhan being declared the Jewish Autonomous Region on 7 May 1934 as an inter-communal event with the members of the Amur Cossack Host coming out to join the celebrations. Kazkevich's poem had a basis in reality as many members of the Amur Cossack Host hoped that Birobidzhan signalled Soviet interest in the neglected region along the banks of the Amur river.

Canadian Arctic explorer Vilhjalmur Stefansson was vice president of Ambijan, or the American Committee for the Settlement of Jews in Birobidjan, which was a supplementary group that was combined with ICOR in 1946. His support of Birobidzhan as a new homeland for Jewish families consisted of appearing at meetings in support of the relocation of Jews to Birobidzhan as well as advocating for families who truly wished to travel rather than those who were the most suited for the journey.

== Jewish and Yiddish culture ==
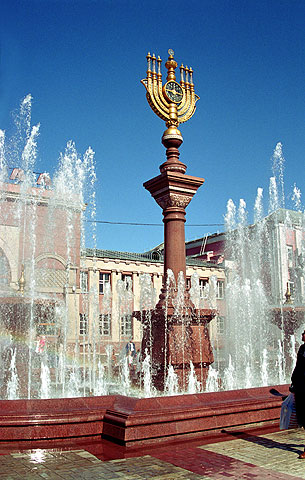
A menorah on the forecourt

The Russian Empire had the largest Jewish population in the world in the 19th and early 20th centuries, with the majority consisting of Ashkenazi Jews. While two million departed for other countries prior to the formation the Soviet Union, a large number still remained.

While thousands of Jews migrated to Birobidzhan, the hardship and isolation caused most to leave. In 1939 the Jewish population made up less than twenty percent of the overall population. Shortly after World War II, the Jewish population in the region reached its peak of about 30,000. As of the mid-2010s, only about 2,000 Jews remain in the region, making up about one half of a percent of the population.

Yiddish, at that time widely regarded as the lingua franca of the Jewish community, was meant to help integrate the Jewish population into the Soviet population. The language would ensure 'national in form, socialist in content' was being followed by the Soviet Jewry. Many government officials in the Kremlin were under the impression that Birobidzhan was to become the new centre for Soviet Jewish life, which is why Jewish migration to Birobidzhan was strongly pushed during the 1920s.

The Jewish religious community in Birobidzhan was officially registered in 1946. The religious community suffered persecution in the early 1950s. Jewish culture was revived in Birobidzhan much earlier than elsewhere in the Soviet Union. Yiddish theaters opened in the 1970s. Since the early 1990s, Yiddish and Jewish traditions were required components in all public schools, taught not as Jewish exotica but as part of the region's national heritage. The orthodox synagogue, completed in 2004, is next to a complex housing Sunday School classrooms, a library, a museum, and administrative offices. The buildings were officially opened in 2004 to mark the 70th anniversary of the founding of the Jewish Autonomous Oblast.

According to Israeli Rabbi Mordechai Scheiner, the former Chief Rabbi of Birobidzhan and Chabad Lubavitch representative to the region, "Today one can enjoy the benefits of the Yiddish culture and not be afraid to return to their Jewish traditions. It's safe without any anti-Semitism, and we plan to open the first Jewish day school here." Scheiner also hosted the Russian television show, Yiddishkeit in the region. His student, actually born in Birobidzhan, Rabbi Eliyahu Riss, has taken over the reins since 2010.

The orthodox synagogue opened in 2004. Rabbi Scheiner says there are 4,000 Jews in Birobidzhan, just over 5 percent of the town's population of 75,000. The Birobidzhan Jewish community was led by Lev Toitman, until his death in September, 2007.

Concerning the Jewish community of the oblast, Governor Nikolay Mikhaylovich Volkov has stated that he intends to "support every valuable initiative maintained by our local Jewish organizations". In 2007, the Birobidzhan International Summer Program for Yiddish Language and Culture was launched by Yiddish studies professor Boris Kotlerman of Bar-Ilan University. The town's main street is named after the Yiddish language author and humorist Sholem Aleichem.

For the Chanukah celebration of 2007, officials of Birobidzhan in the Jewish Autonomous Oblast claimed to have built the world's largest menorah. A November 2017 article in The Guardian, titled, "Revival of a Soviet Zion: Birobidzhan celebrates its Jewish heritage", examined the current status of the city and suggested that, even though the Jewish Autonomous Region in Russia's far east is now barely 1% Jewish, officials hope to woo back people who left after Soviet collapse.

Rabbi Eli Riss has set out to return the Jewish culture to the Jewish Autonomous Oblast. The current slogan is "make Birobidzhan Jewish again". The people want this to include teaching Yiddish in the school systems again as well as celebrating the variety of Jewish holidays. Riss' parents were originally residents of Birobidzhan, but moved to Israel in the 1990s along with a large majority of the Jewish population from the Oblast. He came back as the Chief Rabbi with plans of reinvigorating the Jewish culture. There are already plans for a kosher restaurant, supermarket, and mikveh. Riss is trying to make Birobidzhan a 'safe place for Jews' and has already stated that it is one of the few places he has been where he has not experienced any antisemitism.

== Administrative and municipal status ==
Birobidzhan is the administrative center of the autonomous oblast and, within the framework of administrative divisions, it also serves as the administrative center of Birobidzhansky District, although it is not a part of it. As an administrative division, it is incorporated separately as the town of oblast significance of Birobidzhan—an administrative unit with a status equal to that of the districts. As a municipal division, the town of oblast significance of Birobidzhan is incorporated as Birobidzhan Urban Okrug.

== Economy, infrastructure and transportation ==
The chief economic activity is light industry, including textile and footwear. The city also has a vehicle repair factory, a furniture factory, a quicklime production factory, and several foodstuff factories. Khabarovsk is the closest major city to Birobidzhan and provides the closest major airport access to it, which is Khabarovsk Novy Airport (KHV / UHHH), 198 km from the center of Birobidzhan.

== Education ==
The Sholem Aleichem Amur State University works in cooperation with the local religious community. The university is unique in the Russian Far East. Studies include Yiddish, Hebrew, history and classic Jewish texts. The town has several state-run schools that teach Yiddish, as well as an Anglo-Yiddish faculty at its higher education college, a Yiddish school for religious instruction and a kindergarten. The five- to seven-year-olds spend two lessons a week learning to speak Yiddish, as well as being taught Jewish songs, dance and traditions.

== Climate ==
Birobidzhan experiences a harsh, monsoon-influenced humid continental climate (Köppen climate classification Dwb) that is typified by very large seasonal temperature differences, with warm to hot (and often humid) summers and severely cold (and dry) winters. January has never had an above-freezing temperature.

Climate data for Birobidzhan
Month	Jan	Feb	Mar	Apr	May	Jun	Jul	Aug	Sep	Oct	Nov	Dec	Year
Record high °C (°F)	−0.4 (31.3)	5.9 (42.6)	18.4 (65.1)	29.8 (85.6)	33.7 (92.7)	37.1 (98.8)	39.9 (103.8)	36.8 (98.2)	32.7 (90.9)	26.9 (80.4)	16.1 (61.0)	5.2 (41.4)	39.9 (103.8)
Mean daily maximum °C (°F)	−15.6 (3.9)	−10.9 (12.4)	0.2 (32.4)	9.5 (49.1)	18.2 (64.8)	24.5 (76.1)	26.8 (80.2)	24.3 (75.7)	18.1 (64.6)	8.5 (47.3)	−4.1 (24.6)	−14.2 (6.4)	7.0 (44.6)
Daily mean °C (°F)	−22.2 (−8.0)	−16.5 (2.3)	−6.4 (20.5)	5.4 (41.7)	13.0 (55.4)	18.9 (66.0)	21.1 (70.0)	19.2 (66.6)	12.8 (55.0)	3.9 (39.0)	−9.2 (15.4)	−18.8 (−1.8)	1.9 (35.4)
Mean daily minimum °C (°F)	−27.4 (−17.3)	−26.4 (−15.5)	−16.5 (2.3)	−3.4 (25.9)	5.0 (41.0)	12.5 (54.5)	15.1 (59.2)	13.4 (56.1)	5.9 (42.6)	−1.3 (29.7)	−16.9 (1.6)	−26.6 (−15.9)	−3.6 (25.5)
Record low °C (°F)	−43.7 (−46.7)	−39.9 (−39.8)	−34.1 (−29.4)	−19.7 (−3.5)	−3.9 (25.0)	1.5 (34.7)	5.9 (42.6)	3.7 (38.7)	−3.9 (25.0)	−19.8 (−3.6)	−33.6 (−28.5)	−37.9 (−36.2)	−43.7 (−46.7)
Average precipitation mm (inches)	6 (0.2)	5 (0.2)	13 (0.5)	35 (1.4)	61 (2.4)	108 (4.3)	147 (5.8)	154 (6.1)	88 (3.5)	35 (1.4)	19 (0.7)	11 (0.4)	682 (26.9)
Average precipitation days	2	2	4	6	10	12	13	13	10	5	4	3	84
Source 1: World Meteorological Organisation (UN)
Source 2: [www.retscreen.net/ru/home.php NASA RETScreen Database]

== Sports ==
The bandy club Nadezhda played in the 2nd highest division, the Russian Bandy Supreme League, until the 2016–17 season. However, in 2017–18 the team did not play in the league.

== Twin towns – sister cities ==
Birobidzhan is twinned with:

- Beaverton, OR, United States
- Niigata, Japan
- Hegang, China
- Yichun, China
- Ma'alot-Tarshiha, Israel
- Nof HaGalil, Israel

== In popular culture ==
- Soviet Zion, a contemporary opera set in 1930s Birobidzhan
- In Search of Happiness, a documentary about modern-day Birobidzhan

== Notable people ==
- Nataliya Gumenyuk, journalist, teacher

== See also ==
- Organization for Jewish Colonization in the Soviet Union (IKOR)
- History of the Jews in the Jewish Autonomous Oblast
- New Jerusalem
- Beit T'shuva
- Boris "Dov" Kaufman
- Yoel Razvozov, an Israeli judoka and member of Parliament, born in Birobidzhan
