= List of Jewish Autonomous Oblast leaders =

The following is a list of leaders in Russia's Jewish Autonomous Oblast (JAO):

== Jewish leadership in the 21st Century ==
Jews have historically played a role in the Jewish Autonomous Oblast's Jewish community, historical narrative, and government. In 2004 Chief Rabbi of Russia, Berel Lazar, took part in the 70th anniversary celebration for the Jewish Autonomous Oblast. Rabbi Lazar and Avraham Berkowitz, the Executive Director of the Federation of Jewish Communities of the CIS, led a delegation to Birobidzhan for the event. Local Jewish Community leaders Mayor Alexander Vinnikov, Lev Toitman, and Valery Solomonovich Gurevich also participated in the opening of the Birobidzhan Synagogue, which marked the 70th anniversary of the region. Rabbi Mordechai Scheiner, the Chief Rabbi of Birobidzhan and Chabad Lubavitch representative to the region, said "Today one can enjoy the benefits of the Yiddish culture and not be afraid to return to their Jewish traditions. Its safe without any Anti-Semitism and we plan to open the first Jewish day school here". Concerning the Jewish Community of the oblast, then-Governor Nikolay Mikhaylovich Volkov stated that he intended to, "support every valuable initiative maintained by our local Jewish organizations."

== Jewish leaders of the JAO ==
- Alexander Vinnikov – Mayor of Birobizhan from July 1999 – January 2010, then governor of the JAO between February 2010 – February 2015.
- Alexander Levintal – Appointed acting-governor of the JAO in February 2015, then elected Governor in September 2015 and remained in the position until his resignation in December 2019.
- Valery Solomonovich Gurevich – Vice-Chairman of the JAO.
- Lev Toitman – Former Chairman of Birobidzhan's 4,500-member Jewish Community (Federation of Jewish Communities of the CIS).
- Mordechai Scheiner – Chief Rabbi of Birobidzhan between 2002 – 2011.
- Boris "Dov" Kaufman – Leader of Beit T'shuva, a small Jewish community based in Birobidzhan synagogue.
- Rostislav Goldshteyn – Acting-governor of the JAO from December 2019 – September 2020, then elected Governor, and remained in the position until he was reassigned in November 2024.

== Non-Jewish leaders of the JAO ==
- Nikolay Mikhaylovich Volkov – Former governor of the JAO.
- Viktor Gozhy – First Vice-Chairman of the JAO.
- Maria Kostyuk – Governor of the JAO since September 2025. Acting-governor from November 2024 to September 2025.

== See also ==
- Administrative divisions of the Jewish Autonomous Oblast
- Tongjiang-Nizhneleninskoye railway bridge
- Sholem Aleichem Amur State University
- Birobidzhaner Shtern
- David Bergelson
- History of the Jews in the Jewish Autonomous Oblast
- Mikhail Kalinin
- Semyon Dimanstein
