= Pyotr Smidovich =

Russian revolutionary and Soviet politician

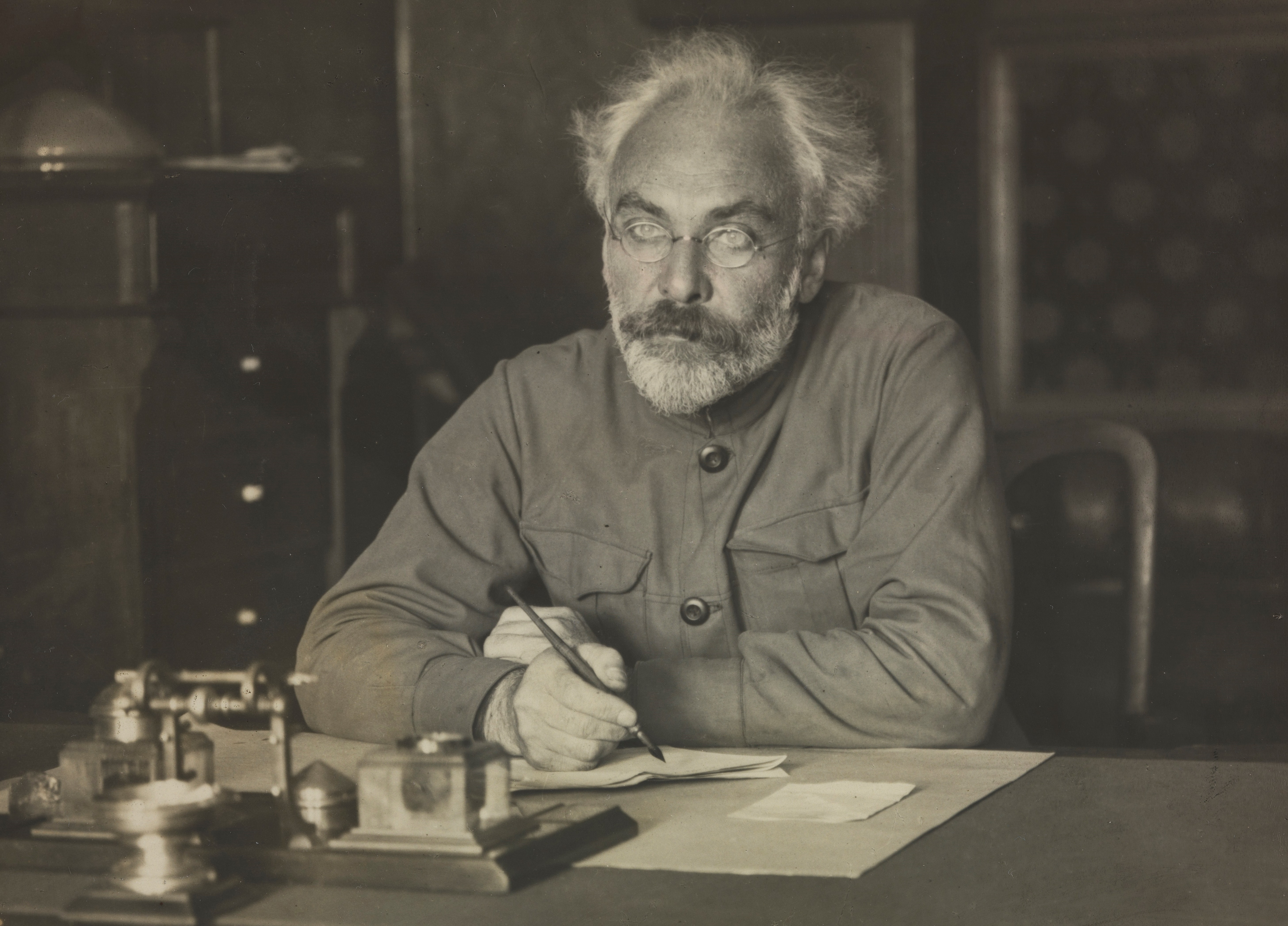

Mayor of Moscow
- In office March 1918 – October 1918
- Preceded by: Mikhail Pokrovsky
- Succeeded by: Lev Kamenev

Personal details
- Born: May 7, 1874 Rahachow, Russian Empire
- Died: April 16, 1935 (aged 60) Moscow, Russian SFSR, Soviet Union
- Spouse: Sofia Smidovich

Pyotr Germogenovich Smidovich (Russian: Пётр Гермогенович Смидович; 19 May [O.S. 7 May] 1874 – 16 April 1935), was a Russian revolutionary and Soviet politician.

Born into a noble family of the Suchekomanty coat of arms, he joined the Russian Social Democratic Labour Party in 1898 and worked as an agent for the party's newspaper, Iskra.

During the October Revolution of 1917, he was a member of the Moscow Military Revolutionary Committee, a member of the Presidium of the All-Russian Central Executive Committee and the Supreme Council of National Economy.

From March 1918 to October 1918 Smidovich served as the chairman of the Moscow Soviet. From 1919 he was the chairman of the Moscow Provincial Economic Council. In 1920 he took part in the Soviet delegation at the peace negotiations with Poland. In 1921 he took part in the liquidation of the Tambov and Kronstadt rebellions. On December 30, 1922, he opened the I All-Union Congress of Soviets, was elected to its presidium. From 1922 he was a member of the Anti-Religious Commission under the Central Committee of the All-Union Communist Party (Bolsheviks) and head of the Secretariat for Religious Affairs under the All-Russian Central Executive Committee, since 1929 he was Chairman of the Standing Commission on Cults under the Presidium of the All-Russian Central Executive Committee.

Smidovich was the leader of the communist organization Komzet, which was established in 1921 in Russia. The idea to found a Jewish Autonomous Oblast in the USSR with Yiddish as its official language belonged to Mikhail Kalinin and Smidovich.

Pyotr Smidovich died in Moscow on April 16, 1935. The urn with his ashes was buried in Red Square near the Kremlin Wall.

The urban-type settlement of Smidovich in the Jewish Autonomous Oblast is named after him.

== See also ==
- List of Jewish Autonomous Oblast Leaders
- Jews and Judaism in the Jewish Autonomous Oblast
- Mikhail Kalinin

Political offices
Preceded by Mikhail Pokrovsky	Mayor of Moscow; March–October, 1918	Succeeded by Lev Kamenev
