= Lev Toitman =

Russian-Jewish leader active in Birobidzhan

Lev Grigorievich Toitman (Russian: Лев Григорьевич Тойтман; 1925 – September 11, 2007) was a soldier in World War II. Toitman is known for the "foundation and revival of the local Jewish community" in Birobidzhan.

== Jewish Community leadership ==
Lev Toitman was the Federation of Jewish Communities of the CIS Chairman for Birobidzhan, the capital of the Jewish Autonomous Oblast. During the time of his leadership, the Jewish Community of Birobidzhan had a membership of about 4,500. Lev Toitman led this community from 1997 until he died on September 11, 2007. In 2004, Lev Toitman participated in the 70th anniversary celebration for the Jewish Autonomous Oblast. The anniversary was celebrated with the opening of Birobidzhan Synagogue. Toitman played a role in both the synagogue's construction and opening. On the day of the opening, Rabbi Mordechai Scheiner, the Chief Rabbi of Birobidzhan and Chabad Lubavitch representative to the region, said "Today one can enjoy the benefits of the Yiddish culture and not be afraid to return to their Jewish traditions. Its safe without any Anti-Semitism and we plan to open the first Jewish day school here".

== Awards and Medals ==
Lev Toitman was awarded the Order of Friendship in 2005 for organizing the Jewish Community of Birobidzhan. For his service at the front during World War II, and for being seriously wounded in battle, he earned two medals for bravery. Lev Toitman also bore the title 'Honorable Citizen of the Jewish Autonomous Oblast."

== See also ==
- Jews and Judaism in the Jewish Autonomous Oblast
- List of Jewish Autonomous Oblast Leaders
