= In Search of Happiness =

- Boris Rak sitting in his kitchen
- Directed by: Alexander Gutman
- Written by: Hana Belohradska
- Produced by: Viacheslav Telnov
- Distributed by: St. Petersburg Documentary Film Studio
- Release date: 2005
- Running time: 54 minutes
- Country: Russia
- Language: Russian with English subtitles

In Search of Happiness (Russian: В поисках счастья) is a 2005 Russian documentary film that poetically follows the lives of Boris and Masha Rak, Soviet Jews who in 1934 moved to the Jewish Autonomous Oblast (JAO) created by the Soviet government in Russian Far East. The film won the Best Documentary award in the Russian Film Festival in 2006.

The Jewish population of the JAO never reached 30% and as of 2003 it was only about 1.2%. The population of the capital, Birobidzhan, has dwindled. The city's only Birobidzhan Synagogue holds services twice a week.

== Summary ==
The film shows Boris's and Masha's modest life, without modern technology, relying on each other's hard work to survive. Rak is the chairman of Birobidzhan's last collective farm, which excessive rain has reduced to a swampland. For Rak, the puddles have become "a memorial to his life's work." The two also raise animals, which are all given the names of political leaders.

"No one wants to invest any money in this city, because they don't want two homelands,” one of the only practicing Jews in Birobidzhan explains, “Jews in Moscow, Saint Petersburg, Kyiv all receive money. But the only money we get is to help the Jews who are here to leave.”

The documentary stresses human vulnerability. Nature has reduced the once prosperous communal farm into a swampy, puddled mush. Physical handicaps and old age cripple the people that the film follows, and it is clear that their expectations of the Jewish Republic have been met by disappointment. Despite being subjected to the negative effects of rain, aging, politics, and other's people's decisions, Rak and Masha continue to persevere.

== Accolades ==
- Winner, Best Documentary in the Russian Film Festival, 2006
- Honorable Mention in the Cinema du Reel Film Festival, 2006
- Official Selection in the Leipzig Festival for Documentary Films, 2006
- Official Selection Docpoint Film Festival, 2006

== See also ==
- Jewish State
- History of the Jews in Serbia
- Secular Jewish culture
- List of Czech and Slovak Jews
- Progressive Jewish Thought and the New Anti-Semitism
- History of the Jews in Russia and the Soviet Union
- Antisemitism and Joseph Stalin
- Jews and Judaism in the Jewish Autonomous Oblast

Other documentaries about Jewish communities outside of Israel:

- Jews of Iran
- Next Year in Argentina
- The Jewish Steppe
