= Birobidzhan Synagogue =

Chabad synagogue Birobidzhan, Jewish Autonomous Oblast, Russia

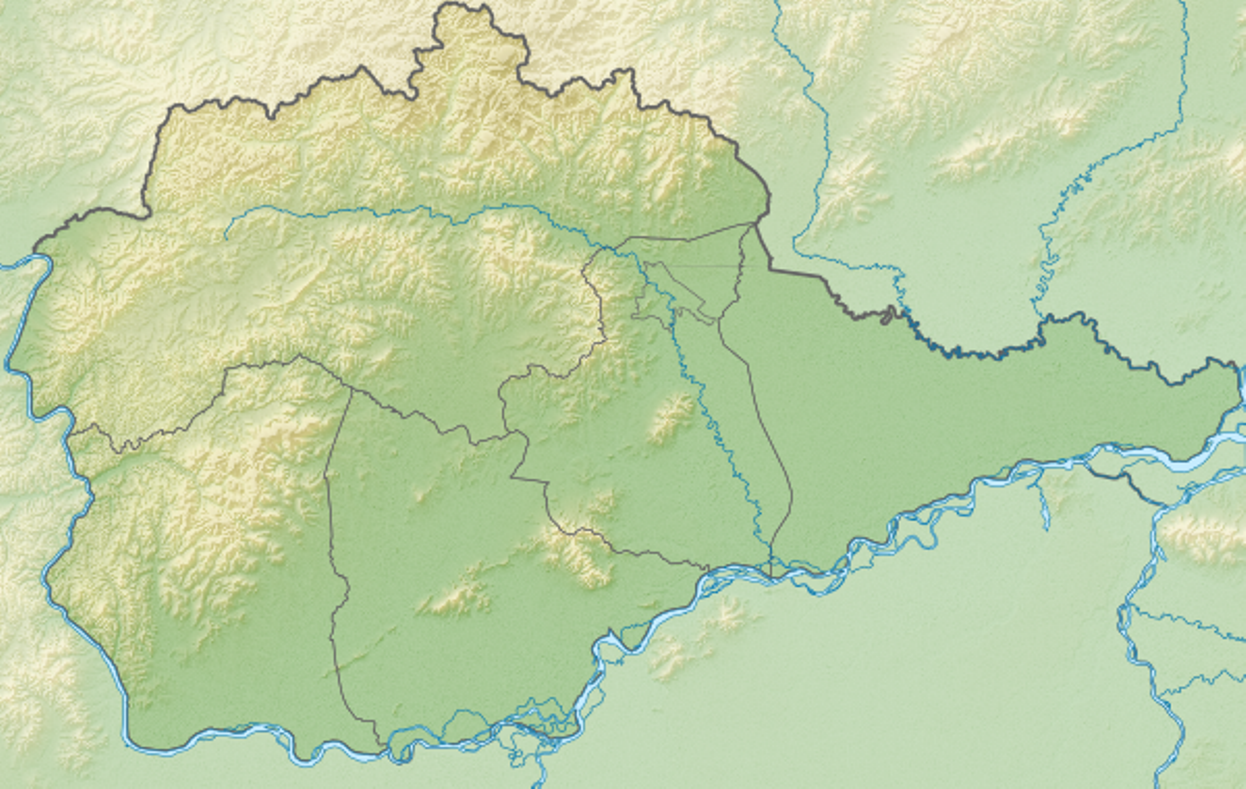
- Location of the synagogue in the Jewish Autonomous Oblast

Religion
- Affiliation: Hasidic Judaism
- Rite: Nusach Ari
- Ecclesiastical or organisational status: Synagogue
- Status: Active

Location
- Location: 19 Lenina Street, Birobidzhan, Jewish Autonomous Oblast
- Country: Russia
- Coordinates: 48°47′28″N 132°55′48″E

Architecture
- Type: Synagogue architecture
- Funded by: Government of the Russian Federation (part)
- Groundbreaking: 2000
- Completed: 2004
- Materials: Brick

The Birobidzhan Synagogue, officially the Freyd Community and Beit Menachem Synagogue in Birobidzhan, is a Chabad Jewish congregation and synagogue, located at 19 Lenina Street, in the city of Birobidzhan, in the capital of the Jewish Autonomous Oblast, in Russia.

According to the Federation of Jewish Communities of the CIS, it is "the first synagogue in Russia to be built partly with state money". The Russian government allotted US$112,000 to help build the synagogue that was completed in 2004.

== History ==
=== 2004 opening ===
In 2004, the Chief Rabbi of Russia, Berel Lazar, took part in the 70th-anniversary celebration of the Jewish Autonomous Oblast. Rabbi Lazar and Avraham Berkowitz, the executive director of the Federation of Jewish Communities of the CIS, led a delegation to Birobidzhan for the event. Mayor Alexander Vinnikov and Valery Solomonovich Gurevich also participated in the opening. Governor Nikolay Mikhaylovich Volkov stated that the Birobidzhan Synagogue is the Jewish Autonomous Oblast's first "kosher synagogue, according to Jewish law." Rabbi Mordechai Scheiner, the Chief Rabbi of Birobidzhan and Chabad Lubavitch representative to the region, said "Today one can enjoy the benefits of the Yiddish culture and not be afraid to return to their Jewish traditions. It is safe without any antisemitism and we plan to open the first Jewish day school here". The local Jewish community leader, Lev Toitman, also participated.

=== Jewish community ===
According to Rabbi Scheiner, there are 4,000 Jews in Birobidzhan, or just over 5 percent of the town's 75,000 population. In 2006, Rabbi Scheiner visited the villages of Bira (Jewish Autonomous Oblast), Naifeld, Londoko, Birakan and Birofeld with the Jewish Community of Birobidzhan. Together they inspected local cemeteries and gathered information about the Jews buried there in the years prior to World War II. The names of these individuals are listed in the Memory Book in the Birobidzhan Synagogue. The dates of birth and death are written down according to the Hebrew calendar as well as the Gregorian calendar. As of 2007, some of the original Jewish settlers were still present in these villages. Lev Toitman led the community of Birobidzhan from 1997 until he died on September 11, 2007.

=== International support ===
In 2004, the Jewish community in Birobidzhan received an Aron Kodesh. This special storage case for the Torah, from Birobidzhan's sister city in China, was made in accordance with Jewish canons. In 2008, Shalom Brandman, a resident of Ramat Gan, Israel, donated a Judaic studies collection to the synagogue after his visit to Birobidzhan during the 2007 summer Yiddish program.

== See also ==
- History of the Jews in the Jewish Autonomous Oblast
- List of synagogues in Russia
- Birobidzhan Jewish National University
