= Birobidzhaner Shtern =

Russian Jewish newspaper

- Type: Weekly newspaper
- Format: A3
- Editor-in-chief: Yelena Sarashevskaya
- Founded: November 1930
- Language: Yiddish, Russian
- Country: Russia
- Circulation: 5,000
- Website: gazetaeao.ru

The Birobidzhaner Shtern (Yiddish: ביראָבידזשאַנער שטערן; Russian: Биробиджанер штерн Birobidžaner štern; "The Birobidzhan Star") is a newspaper published in both Yiddish and Russian in the Jewish Autonomous Oblast of Russia. It was set up in November 1930 in Birobidzhan to cater for the newly arrived Jewish immigrants. It is the oldest national newspaper in the region.

== History ==
Birobidzhaner Shtern was established on October 30, 1930. Jankel Levin was first editor of the newspaper. He received the first printing equipment from China. Emmanuil Kazakevich, who was awarded the Stalin-Prize twice, the highest literary award in the country, was an author and staff member of the newspaper in 1935–1938. During the Second World War, Birobidzhaner Shtern became part of the newspaper “Birobidzhanskaya Zvezda”. In May 1945 the Birobidzhaner Shtern resumed its independent edition. The Jewish Autonomous Oblast had been set up by the Soviet government in an attempt to resolve the Jewish Question and provide an alternative to the Zionist Jewish experience offered later by Israel. The publication was interrupted in 1949 and continued since 1952. According to official data it had an edition of 12,000 in 1970. Birobidzhaner Shtern was the only newspaper in Russia that contained a section in Yiddish.

The newspaper, led by a local Yiddish-speaking woman, Yelena Sarashevskaya, features Yiddish and Russian articles written by contributors from different countries, including Yoel Matveyev and Velvl Chernin.

Mordechai Scheiner, a Yiddish speaker and the former Chief Rabbi for the Jewish Autonomous Oblast and head of the Birobidzhan Synagogue, and additional Jewish settlements such as Valdheym. was one of the paper's readers and supporters. The previous Birobidzhan rabbi Eli Riss, was born in the city and supports Yiddish activities in the city. The current rabbi, Efraim Kolpak, is also a vocal supporter of the newspaper and Yiddish activism in Birobidzhan.

In 2009 Birobidzhaner Shtern and the regional newspaper Birobidzhanskaya Zvezda united under Birobidzhan Publishing House.

== Recognitions ==
In 1980, Birobidzhaner Shtern was awarded the Order of the Badge of Honor.

== Chief Editors ==
- Henekh Kazakevich (1932–1935)
- Buzi Goldenberg (1936–1937)
- Buzi Miller (1941, 1944–1948)
- Naum (Nokhem) Fridman (1949–1950)
- Naum Korchminski (1956–1984)
- Leonid Shkolnik (1984–1988)
- Inna Dmitrienko (from 1994)

== See also ==
- History of the Jews in the Jewish Autonomous Oblast
- History of the Jews in Russia and Soviet Union
- Yevsektsiya
- Yiddishkeit (TV series)
