= Nikolay Volkov (politician) =

Russian politician (born 1951)

- Николай Волков
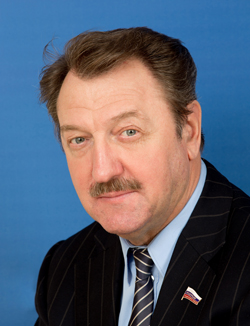

Russian Federation Senator from the Jewish Autonomous Oblast
- In office 3 March 2010 – 22 September 2015
- Preceded by: Igor Glukhovsky
- Succeeded by: Rostislav Goldstein

1st Governor of Jewish Autonomous Oblast
- In office 26 October 1991 – 25 February 2010
- Succeeded by: Alexander Vinnikov

Personal details
- Born: Nikolay Mikhaylovich Volkov; 19 December 1951 (age 74) Krasnoye, Shablykinsky District, Oryol Oblast, RSFSR, Soviet Union
- Party: United Russia

Nikolay Mikhaylovich Volkov (Russian: Никола́й Миха́йлович Во́лков; born 19 December 1951) is a Russian politician.

== Childhood and education ==
Volkov was born in 1951 in Krasnoye village, in the Shablykinsky district of the Oryol Region. In 1973, Volkov graduated from a civil engineer institute in Odessa.

== Politics ==
Volkov is the former governor of the Jewish Autonomous Oblast. Volkov was a member of Our Home - Russia. Viktor Gozhy is the First vice-chairman of the Jewish Autonomous Oblast and next in the line of succession after Volkov. In 2006, Volkov met with an American consul general, who also met with representatives of the JAO's Jewish community and visited Birobidzhan Synagogue. The two men discussed the potential for cooperation between U.S. and JAO businessmen.

== Relationship with Jewish Community ==
In 1997, Governor Volkov stated that he wanted, "our Jewish community to have a permanent rabbi and a synagogue."

Concerning the Jewish community of the oblast and the Birobidzhan Synagogue, Volkov has stated that he intends to, "support every valuable initiative maintained by our local Jewish organizations."

In 2004, Volkov received an award for the category 'Regional Leader' during the 'Man of the Year 5764' Ceremony organized by the Federation of Jewish Communities of the CIS. This award served as recognition for, "his initiative in the revival of Jewish life in Birobidzhan and in arranging the Jewish Autonomous Oblast's 70th anniversary celebrations."

== See also ==
- List of Jewish Autonomous Oblast Leaders
