= Yiddishkeit (TV series) =

Yiddishkeit (Russian: Идишкайт) is a Russian documentary television show concerning the subject of Yiddishkeit. Since 2005, when the show had begun taking its current format, it is edited by Tatyana Kadinskaya, directed by Natalya Kaper and filmed by Oleg Veksler. The former Chief Rabbi of the Jewish Autonomous Oblast, Mordechai Scheiner, and his wife, Esther Scheiner, were often guests who hosted parts of the show. Before 2005, various programs related to Yiddish and Jewish subjects were regularly broadcast by the local television without a specific name.

Yiddishkeit is viewed in the Jewish Autonomous Oblast and the Russian Far East. The television show is broadcast each Friday out of Birobidzhan and often contains both Russian and Yiddish content. In 2015, when the show celebrated its anniversary, it was reported that Yiddishkeit had aired by then more than 500 episodes. Recent episodes are posted online by the local TV channel.

== See also ==
- Jews and Judaism in the Jewish Autonomous Oblast
- List of Jewish Autonomous Oblast Leaders
