= Coat of arms of the Jewish Autonomous Oblast =

Russian regional coat of arms

- Armiger: Jewish Autonomous Oblast
- Adopted: 31 July 1996

The coat of arms of the Jewish Autonomous Oblast (Note: Russian: Герб Еврейской автономной области, romanized: Gerb Jevrejskoj avtonomnoj oblastj; Yiddish: הערב פון ייִדישע אװטאָנאָמע (אױטאָנאָמע) געגנט, romanized: Herb fun Yidishe avtonome (oytonome) gegnt) is the official coat of arms of the Jewish Autonomous Oblast in Russia. It consists of a Siberian tiger standing on four legs with the tail and the head turned upwards, of which the latter is facing the observer. This specific position and occurrence of the tiger symbolizes the history and development of the Oblast. The emblem is a heraldic French shield (the ratio of width to height is 8:9) and the background represents the color of the geographical characteristics of the Russian Far East, which includes taigas, hills, and meadows.

== Symbolism ==
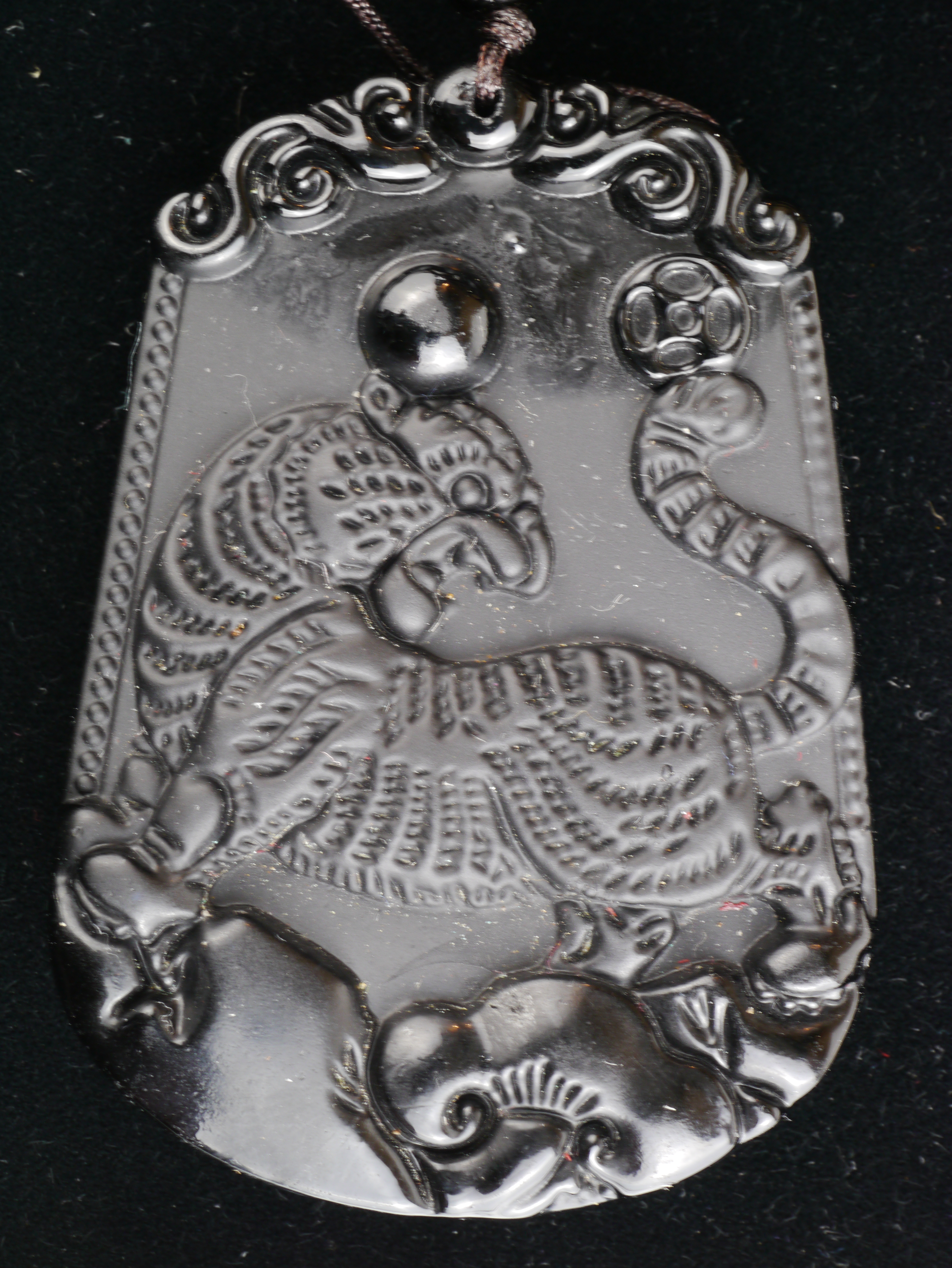
Chinese religious pendant depicting a tiger.

The Siberian tiger was a commonly revered symbol in multiple cultures around the Amur river (it is, in fact, also called Amur tiger). The Tunguska people considered the tiger a deity and often referred to it as "Grandfather". The Udege and Nanai people call it "Amba". The Manchu considered the Siberian tiger as a king, because of a mark on its forehead that can resemble the Chinese character for "King" (Chinese: 王; pinyin: Wáng). From 1642 to 1846, the tiger was mistakenly used as a heraldic figure in the coat of arms of Irkutsk because of the similarities between the old Russian word for tiger (babr) and beaver (bober).

The bluish-green colour of the coat of arms is due to green historically being associated with the Amur region, which was known as the "Green Wedge" (Russian: Зелёный Клин).

== Usage ==
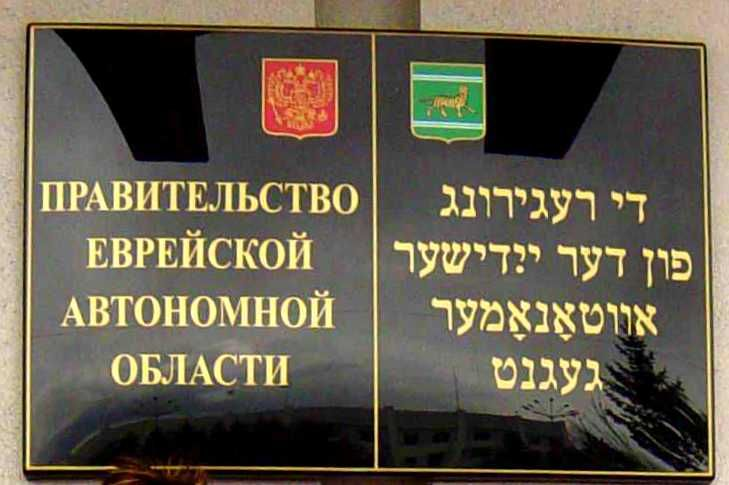
Sign on the JAO government headquarters.

On 28 March 1928, the Presidium of the General Executive Committee of the USSR passed the decree "On the attaching for Komzet of free territory near the Amur River in the Far East for settlement of the working Jews." The decree meant "a possibility of establishment of a Jewish administrative territorial unit on the territory of said region". Two Jewish districts (raiony) were formed in Crimea and three in south Ukraine. However, an alternative scheme, perceived as more advantageous, was put into practice. Thus, Jewish Autonomous Oblast started as a Soviet administrative subject.

During the Soviet era, all administrative subjects used the hammer and sickle as a common emblem. After the dissolution of Soviet Union in 1991, the hammer and sickle were to be replaced as they symbolized the authority of the Communist Party of the Soviet Union. In 1993, the hammer and sickle were officially fully abandoned.

On July 31, 1996, the oblast officially adopted the coat of arms. However, the current version of the coat of arms was officially declared on April 23, 2008, with "Law of the Jewish Autonomous Region (#369-OZ) On State Symbols of the Jewish Autonomous Region", which states:

"The coat of arms of the region is a heraldic French shield (the ratio of width to height is 8:9) of aquamarine color, in the upper and lower parts of which there are narrow horizontal stripes, consisting of white, blue and white stripes, equal in width to each other, making up 1/50 height of the coat of arms and symbolizing the Bira and Bijan rivers. In the center of the emblem, there is a golden Ussuri tiger with black stripes according to its natural color. The figure of the tiger is turned to the right of the viewer. A multi-color and one-color drawing of the coat of arms of the region is placed in annexes 2 and 3 to this law."

In 2009, the Central Bank of Russia issued 10 million ten-ruble coins dedicated to the 75th anniversary of the Jewish autonomous region. On the backside of the coin is the coat of arms of the Jewish Autonomous Oblast. On the ring around the circumference are inscriptions: at the top is "Russian Federation" and at the bottom the "Jewish Autonomous Oblast".

== Similar coats of arms ==
The Amur tiger, due to its cultural value, is used in several other coats of arms, such as the coat of arms of Primorsky Krai, Vladivostok and Khabarovsk. These regions also are located in Siberia, and they contain shades of green and/or blue as colors. Babr (Бабр) appears in the pre-1846 coat of arms of Irkutsk.

Coat of arms of Primorsky Krai

Coat of arms of Vladivostok

Coat of arms of Khabarovsk

Coat of arms of Irkutsk in 1790

Current coat of arms of Irkutsk

== See also ==
- Flag of the Jewish Autonomous Oblast
- Tyger (heraldry)
- Leopard (heraldry)
- Panther (legendary creature)
