= History of the Jews in the Jewish Autonomous Oblast =

The history of the Jews in the Jewish Autonomous Oblast (JAO), Russia, began with the early settlements of 1928.

Yiddish and Russian are the two official languages of the JAO. According to Peter Matthiessen in The Birds of Heaven, p20-21, “According to local memory, thousands of Jews from Ukraine and elsewhere were transported here during the vast purges and organized famines of the mid-1930s… most of the displaced were city dwellers… a large number of Jews died…”

== Early settlement ==
In May 1928 the first group of Jewish settlers from cities and villages in Ukraine, Belarus and Russia arrived in the region that became the Jewish Autonomous Oblast. These individuals settled in many different areas of the autonomous oblast, some in Birobidzhan and others in various rural settlements.

In 1934, the Jewish Autonomous Oblast was formed in the Russian Far East to show that, like other national groups in the Soviet Union, Russian Jews could receive a territory in which to pursue cultural autonomy in a socialist framework. The JAO's capital city was in Birobidzhan, and Yiddish was its official language. Jewish life was revived in Birobidzhan much earlier than in other regions of the Soviet Union. Yiddish theatres began opening in the 1970s.

== Judaism in the 21st century ==
Rabbi Efraim Kolpak, the Chief Rabbi of Birobidzhan and Chabad Lubavitch representative of the region, said, "Today one can enjoy the benefits of the Yiddish culture and not be afraid to return to their Jewish traditions. It's safe without any antisemitism and we plan to open the first Jewish day school here." Efraim has been the rabbi of Birobidzhan since 2019. He is also the host of the Russian television show Yiddishkeit. The local Orthodox synagogue opened its doors in 2004. Rabbi Kolpak says there are 4,000 Jews in Birobidzhan, just over 5 percent of the town's 75,000 population. The Birobidzhan Jewish Community was led by Lev Toitman, until his death in September 2007.

Yiddish and Jewish traditions have been required components in all public schools for almost fifteen years, taught not as Jewish exotica but as part of the region's national heritage. The Beit Menachem Synagogue, completed in 2004, is accompanied by a complex housing Sunday School classrooms, a library, a museum, and administrative offices. The buildings were officially opened in 2004 to mark the 70th anniversary of the founding of the Jewish Autonomous Oblast. Concerning the Jewish Community of the oblast, Governor Nikolay Mikhaylovich Volkov has stated that he intends to "support every valuable initiative maintained by our local Jewish organizations." In 2007, the First Birobidzhan International Summer Program for Yiddish Language and Culture was launched by Yiddish studies professor Boris Kotlerman of Bar-Ilan University.

In 2004 the Regional Government announced that Chief Rabbi of Russia Berel Lazar has agreed to take part in the 70th anniversary celebration for the Jewish Autonomous Oblast. Rabbi Lazar and Avraham Berkowitz, the Executive Director of the Federation of Jewish Communities CIS will lead a delegation to Birobidjan for the event. The Federation of Jewish Communities of Russia estimates the number of Jews in Russia at about one million, or 0.7 percent of the country's 143 million population.

Concerning the status of Judaism in the Jewish Autonomous Oblast, Chief Rabbi Efraim Kolpak has stated, "Jewish life is reviving, both in quantity and quality." Rabbi Kolpak visited the villages of Bira, Nayfeld, Londoko, Birakan and Birofeld with the Jewish Community of Birobidzhan. Together they inspected local cemeteries and gathered information about the Jews buried there in the years prior to World War II. The names of these individuals are listed in the Memory Book in the Beit Menachem Synagogue Orthodox. The dates of birth and death are written down according to the Hebrew calendar as well as the Gregorian. As of 2007, some of the original Jewish settlers were still present in these villages.

According to the 2021 census, there were only 837 ethnic Jews in the JAO.

=== Leadership ===
Jews have historically played a role in the Jewish Autonomous Oblast's Jewish Community, historical narrative and government. In 2004 Chief Rabbi of Russia Berel Lazar took part in the 70th anniversary celebration for the Jewish Autonomous Oblast. Rabbi Lazar and Avraham Berkowitz, the Executive Director of the Federation of Jewish Communities of the CIS, led a delegation to Birobidzhan for the event. Local Jewish Community leaders; Mayor Alexander Vinnikov, Lev Toitman and Valery Solomonovich Gurevich also participated in the opening of the Birobidzhan Orthodox Synagogue, which marked the 70th anniversary of the region.

=== Synagogues ===
The Beit Menachem Synagogue was established in 2004 in the city of Birobidzhan. It was "the first synagogue in Russia to be built partly with state money," according to the Federation of Jewish Communities of the CIS.

Beit T'shuva is a small Jewish community located in Birobidzhan's old synagogue. The rabbi is Boris "Dov" Kaufman. As of 2005, the religious services have been strictly Jewish and no longer include a blend of Christian and Jewish traditions.

=== World's largest chanukia ===
For the Chanukah celebration of 2007, officials of Birobidzhan in the Jewish Autonomous Oblast claimed to have built the world's largest chanukia at approximately 21 metres (69 ft) tall. It is larger than its counterpart in New York, which is only about 9.8 metres (32 ft) tall.

== Jewish settlements in the JAO ==
- Amurzet
- Bira
- Birakan
- Birobidzhan
- Birofeld
- Danilovka
- Londoko
- Nayfeld
- Smidovich
- Valdgeym

== Jewish leaders of the JAO ==
- Alexander Vinnikov - mayor of Birobizhan
- Valery Solomonovich Gurevich - Vice-Chairman of the JAO
- Lev Toitman - Chairman for Birobidzhan's 4,500 member Jewish Community (Federation of Jewish Communities of the CIS). Died in September 2007
- Rakhmil Leder - succeeded Lev Toitman as Chairman of Brirobidzhan's Jewish Community Freud
- Mordechai Scheiner - Chief Rabbi of JAO
- Boris "Dov" Kaufman - Native JAO rabbi

== JDC work in Birobidzhan ==
The American Jewish Joint Distribution Committee (JDC), the largest Jewish humanitarian organization in the world, provides care for the needy elderly and children of Birobidzhan. They are bringing supplies and basic needs to the poor, and helping the Jewish community to blossom.

== See also ==
- History of the Jews in Russia and Soviet Union
- Administrative divisions of the Jewish Autonomous Oblast
- Tongjiang-Nizhneleninskoye railway bridge
- Birobidzhan Jewish National University
- Birobidzhaner Shtern
- Birobidzhan Synagogue
- David Bergelson
- Mikhail Kalinin
- Semyon Dimanstein
- Beit T'shuva
- L'Chayim, Comrade Stalin!
