= To Life =

To Life may refer to:

- To Life (album), a 1968 album by The Rabbis' Sons
- "To Life" (song), song from the 1964 musical Fiddler on the Roof
- To Life (film), a 2014 film
- To Life, a 1988 Holocaust memoir by Ruth Minsky Sender
- Zindagi Tere Naam (lit. 'To Life'), a 2012 Indian Hindi-language film

== See also ==
- L'Chaim, a Hebrew toast translated as "to life"
- Lechaim, a Russian Jewish magazine
- Life imprisonment, as in "sentenced to life"
