= FJC =

FJC may refer to:

- Federal Judicial Center, a component of the United States federal judiciary
- Federation of Jewish Communities of the CIS
- Florida Junior College, now Florida State College at Jacksonville, in the United States
- Foundation for Jewish Camp, in the United States
- Freely-jointed chain
- Fullerton Junior College, now Fullerton College, in California, United States
- Toyota FJ Cruiser, retro style, mid-size SUV
