= Next Year in Argentina =

- Directed by: Jorge Gurvich and Shlomo Slutzky
- Release date: 2005
- Running time: 62 min.
- Country: Israel
- Language: Spanish with English subtitles

Next Year in Argentina (original title El año que viene en... Argentina) is a 2005 documentary about diaspora Jews, who have either chosen to remain in Argentina or relocate to Israel. Argentine-Israeli filmmakers Jorge Gurvich and Shlomo Slutzky travel to Argentina to speak to those who have stayed behind.

== Summary ==
The title makes reference to “Next year in Jerusalem,” a phrase of a Jewish prayer that Jews have been chanting through two thousand years of exile. Yet nearly 60 years after the founding of the Jewish State, some who've emigrated to the Holy Land still long for the home they left behind—even if home meant poverty and persecution, as it did for many Argentine Jews.

“I always raise the subject of my being Jewish upfront ... for me it’s like my mark ... it’s my pride” says one director's brother. When people ask why he doesn't move to Israel, he responds: “Argentina is the best country in the world.”

Argentina has a long history of anti-Semitism and political unrest, which came to a head in the early 1990s when attacks on its Israeli embassy and Jewish community center left 116 dead, most of them Jews. For many Jews, Israel was the only way out, which was also the case during Argentina’s recent economic crisis. But now, more than ten years after the attacks, and with the country’s economy on the rebound, Argentina’s Jewish community is staying put.

Directors Jorge Gurvich and Shlomo Slutzky grew up in Argentina, and made aliyah as adults. They have built families and careers in Israel but still visit Argentina frequently—perhaps out of a desire to stay in touch with friends and family, but also because, on some essential level, Argentina is still their home. While Shlomo and Jorge continue to straddle two worlds, some of their friends have returned to Argentina after making aliyah. And many, like Gurvich’s brother, refuse to even consider immigrating to Israel.

Many see aliyah as an unwise tradeoff; while Argentine Jews exchange anti-Semitic slurs in the shadow of the attacks, life in Israel demands the far more immediate and permanent sacrifices of a country that is perpetually at war. Israelis believe that “in order to be Jewish you need to live in Israel, to sacrifice yourself and to give up your children for the defense of the country,” says Laura, whose husband was killed in the community center attack. Laura resents the Israeli perception of Diaspora Jews that “makes us ... feel as if we’re not Jewish.” The truth, she says, is that “I don’t have to live in Israel in order to be a Jew.”

While the vast majority of those who have immigrated to Israel may not return, some are still plagued by self-doubt and continue to question their decision years—even decades—after moving to Israel, especially in the wake of the intifada and Israel's economic recession.

But for Gurvich, any need for Jewish identification is satisfied in Israel where he “is not preoccupied with my Jewish identity—it seems natural to me.” And yet, he is drawn back to Argentina, and continues to regard this country as his home.

“I have family in Israel, I’m an Israeli filmmaker, but my heart is still here, in faraway Argentina, and this tears me apart,” he reveals.

== See also ==
Other documentaries about World Jewry:

- In Search of Happiness
- Jews of Iran
- From Swastika to Jim Crow
- Reconstruction
