= Birofeld =

Village in Jewish Autonomous Oblast, Russia

Coordinates: 48.4269°N 132.8013°E

Birofeld (Russian: Бирофельд; Yiddish: ביראפעלד) is a village (selo) in Birobidzhansky District of the Jewish Autonomous Oblast, Russia. It is an early Jewish settlement, which was founded in 1928 when a large collective farm was established in the area. In 2003, a Jewish Book Festival took place here. In 2006, Chief Rabbi of the Jewish Autonomous Oblast, Mordechai Scheiner, visited Birofeld with the Jewish community of Birobidzhan. As of 2007, some of the original Jewish settlers still lived here.

== See also ==
- Jews and Judaism in the Jewish Autonomous Oblast
