= Boris Kaufman (rabbi) =

Russian rabbi

Boris "Dov" Kaufman is a native Birobidzhan rabbi. Rabbi Kaufman has been a part of the Jewish Autonomous Oblast's Jewish community through its transitions from the 1990s into the 21st century. His congregation has been transformed, as has he, from practicing a blend of Jewish and Christian religious practices to mainstream Judaism. Rabbi Kaufman is the leader of Beit T'shuva, a small Jewish community located in Birobidzhan's old synagogue.

In 2010, The Christian Science Monitor reported that, "Nowhere are the ties between Jews and non-Jews here clearer than in Birobidzhan's tiny second synagogue, located on the outskirts of the city. It is Sabbath and it could be a 19th- century Jewish village were it not for the phone in the corner. The building is no more than 40 paces long, with low ceilings and a tin roof. A dozen mostly middle-aged parishioners sit on benches, a simple curtain separating men from women. The rabbi, Dov Kofman, an affable man who walks with a cane, says when the ceremony is over: "I love Israel, my son is now there serving in the army, but this is my fatherland." Suddenly a non-Jewish neighbor stops by to say hello, sitting down on one of the benches. An engineer by training, Yevgeni Stolbov oversaw the construction of most of Birobidzhan, and is now retired. "I love coming here, I would do anything to help this synagogue, it's part of my life and want to see it here forever," he says as his friend, the rabbi, looks on with a smile.

== See also ==
- Jews and Judaism in the Jewish Autonomous Oblast
- List of Jewish Autonomous Oblast Leaders
