= Nayfeld =

Village in Birobidzhansky District, Jewish Autonomous Oblast, Russia

Coordinates: 48°29′47″N 133°6′10″E

Nayfeld (Russian: Найфельд, Yiddish: נייפעלד) is a village (selo) in Birobidzhansky District of the Jewish Autonomous Oblast, located 40 kilometers (25 mi) from Birobidzhan. One of the early Jewish settlements in the area was founded in 1928.

The first grave in the Nayfeld Cemetery dates back to 1929, a year after the first houses in the village were built.

In 2003, a Jewish Book Festival took place in the village. In 2006, Mordechai Scheiner, the Chief Rabbi of the Jewish Autonomous Oblast, visited the village.

== See also ==
- Jews and Judaism in the Jewish Autonomous Oblast
