= Valery Solomonovich Gurevich =

Russian politician

Valery Solomonovich Gurevich, a Russian politician, is the vice-governor of the Jewish Autonomous Oblast.

== Leadership in the Jewish Autonomous Oblast ==
Gurevich both organized, and participated in, the 2004 70th anniversary celebrations of the Jewish Autonomous Oblast (founded in 1934). During this time Gurevich assisted in the opening of the Birobidzhan Synagogue which was coordinated along with the 70th anniversary celebrations.

== Political history ==
Gurevich is the highest ranking Jewish politician in the oblast. His official title is "Vice-chairman of the Government" . He is in the line of succession after the vice-chairman of the Government, Viktor Gozhy, who follows Governor Nikolay Mikhaylovich Volkov

== Jewish heritage ==
Gurevich is the son of Jewish settlers who arrived in the Jewish Autonomous Oblast in the 1930s. Gurevich is interested in developing the region's Jewish identity. Both his parents and grandparents spoke Yiddish. Gurivich has also been described as a Jewish activist.

== Tongjiang-Nizhneleninskoye railway bridge ==
During the 2007 China Harbin International Fair for Trade and Economic Cooperation (Harbin Fair), Valery Solomonovich Gurevich proposed a railway bridge over the Amur River. The bridge will connect Tongjiang with Nizhneleninskoye, a village in the Jewish Autonomous Oblast.

The Chinese portion of the bridge was finished in July 2016. In December 2016, work began on the Russian portion of the bridge.
