= Birobidzhan Yuzhniy Airfield =

- IATA: none; ICAO: UHHB

Summary
- Serves: Birobidzhan, Jewish Autonomous Oblast, Russia
- Elevation AMSL: 66 m / 217 ft
- Coordinates: 48°34′55″N 133°2′35″E
- Interactive map of Birobidzhan Yuzhniy Airfield

Runways
Direction	Length		Surface
Direction	m	ft	Surface
11/29	1,000	3,281	Asphalt concrete

Birobidzhan Yuzhniy Airfield (ICAO: UHHB) is an airport located in Birobidzhan, Jewish Autonomous Oblast, Russia. The airport serves Khabarovsk.

Aerodrome code RU

УХХБ

Magnetic course

107/287

Main runway width

74

Runway lighting

Not

A type: Aerodrome
Aerodrome class:

4th class (up to 10 tons) - An-2, An-3T, An-28, An-38, L-410, M-101T, etc.

Affiliation:

civil Aviation

Status: Acting

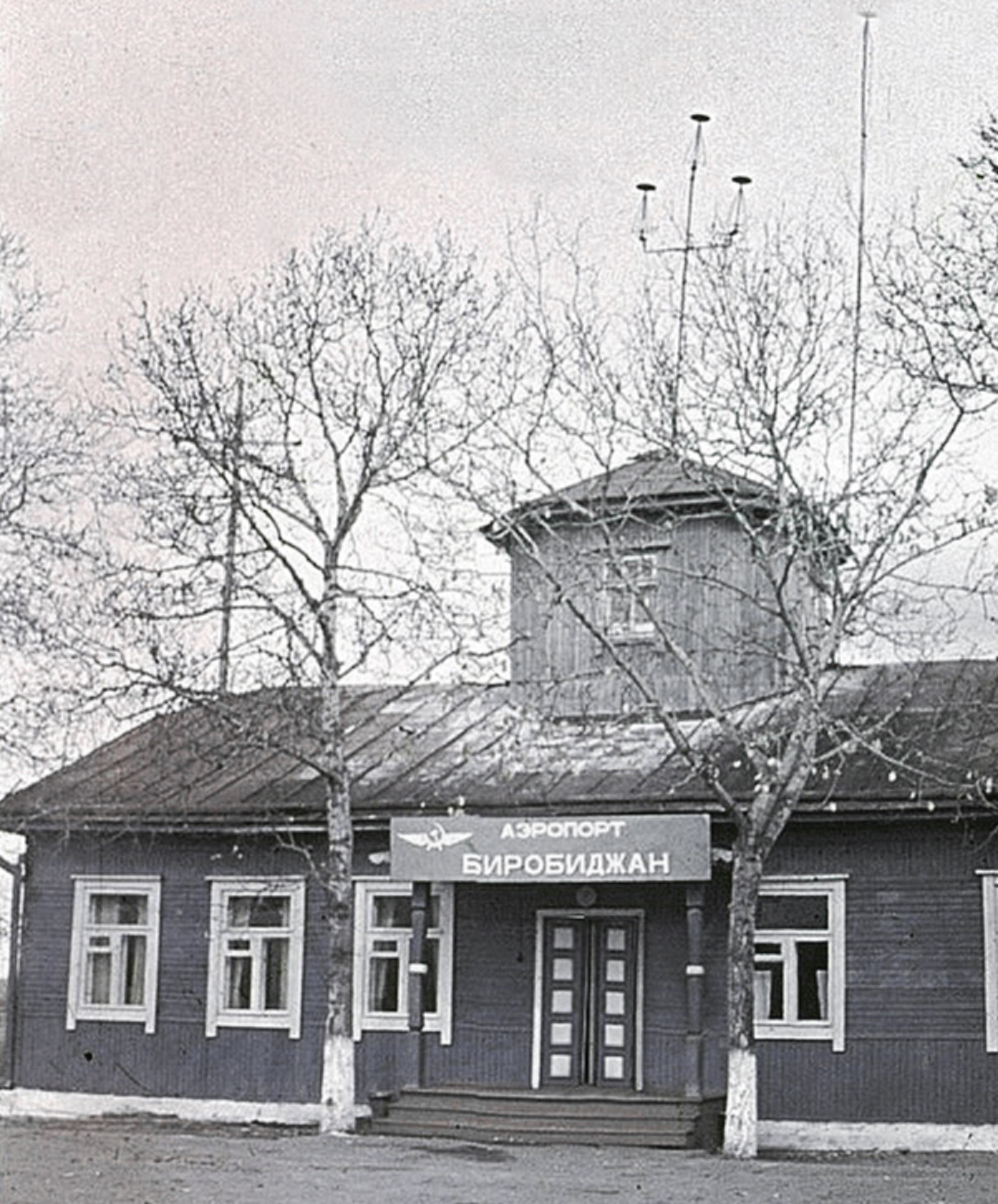

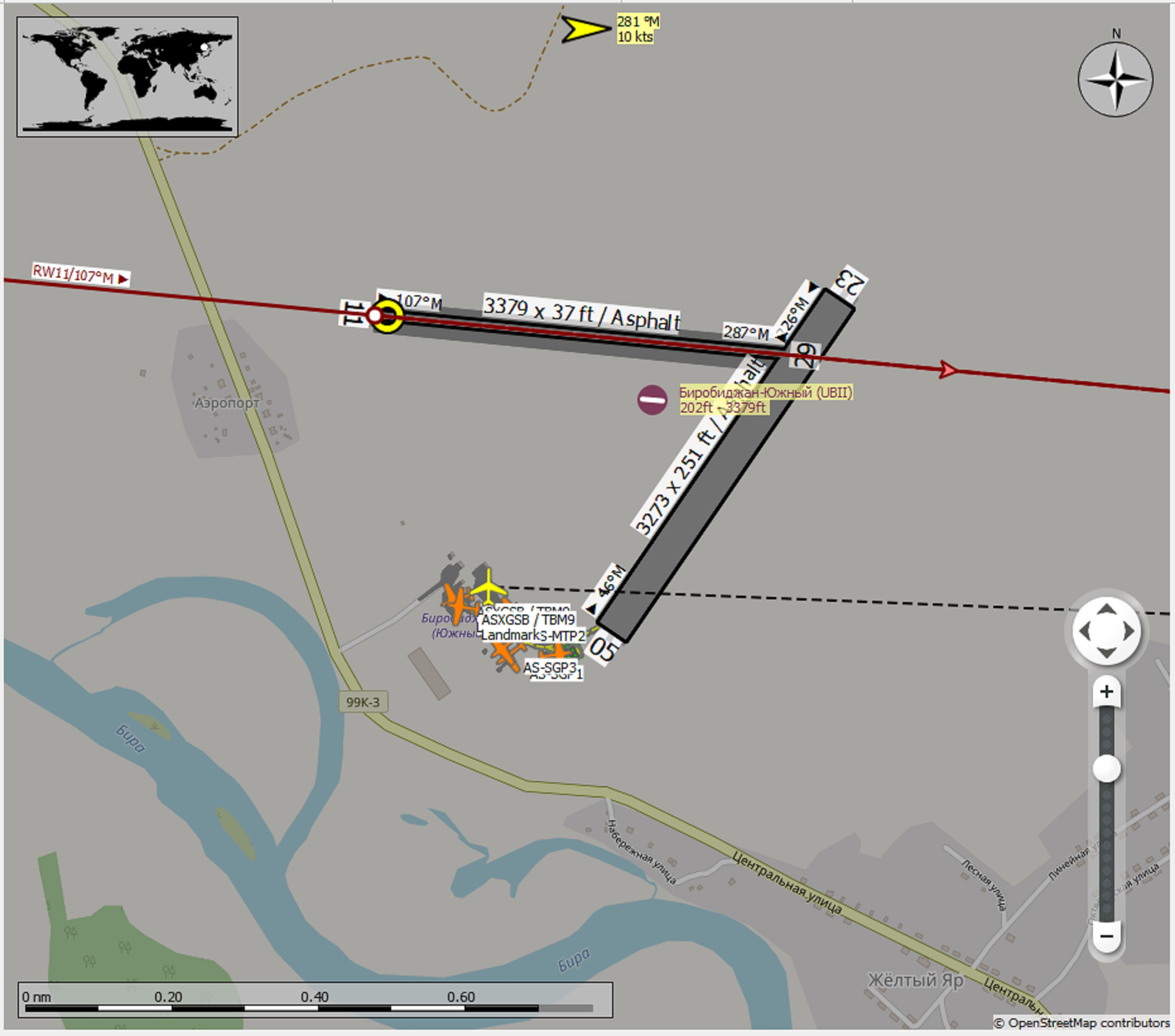
