= Bira, Russia =

Urban settlement in Obluchensky, District of the Jewish Autonomous Oblast, Russia

Coordinates: 48°59′06″N 132°27′53″E

Bira (Russian: Бира) is an urban locality (an urban-type settlement) in Obluchensky District of the Jewish Autonomous Oblast, Russia. Population: 3,167 (2010 census); 4,311 (2002 census); 4,111 (1989 Soviet census).

== History ==
Bira railway station was built in 1908. In 1937, a larger railway station and a depot were constructed.

In 2006, the Chief Rabbi of the Jewish Autonomous Oblast, Mordechai Scheiner, visited Bira to inspect local cemeteries and gather information about the Jews buried there in the years prior to World War II.

== See also ==
- Jews and Judaism in the Jewish Autonomous Oblast
