= Alexander Vinnikov =

Russian politician

- Александр Винников
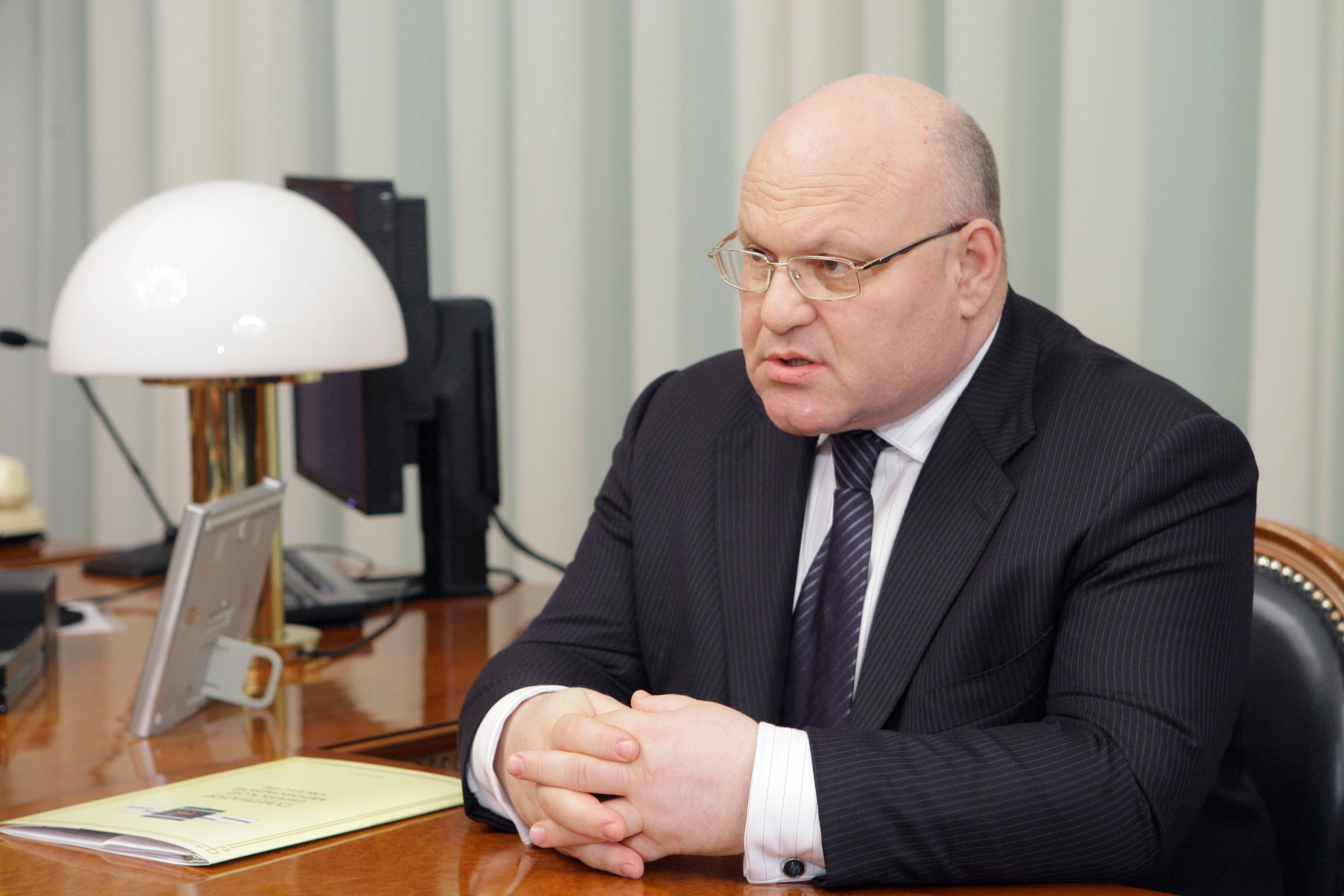
- Vinnikov in 2011

2nd Governor of the Jewish Autonomous Oblast
- In office 25 February 2010 – 24 February 2015
- Preceded by: Nikolay Mikhailovich Volkov
- Succeeded by: Alexander Levintal

Mayor of Birobidzhan
- In office July 1999 – January 2010
- Preceded by: Viktor Bolotnov
- Succeeded by: Andrey Parkhomenko

Personal details
- Born: 6 October 1955 (age 70) Krasny Yar, Khabarovsk Krai, RSFSR, USSR
- Party: United Russia
- Profession: Teacher

Alexander Aronovich Vinnikov (Russian: Александр Аронович Винников; born 6 October 1955) is a Russian politician and formerly the governor of the Jewish Autonomous Oblast.

== Political history ==
Alexander Vinnikov was the mayor of Birobidzhan, the capital of the Jewish Autonomous Oblast. The 2004 Birobidzhan mayoral election was held during the same time as the 2004 Russian presidential election. On 14 March 2004, Alexander Vinnikov, the incumbent, faced professor Miron Fishbeyn, and Aleksandr Kurdyukov of the Birobidzhan municipal administration. Alexander Vinnikov won the election.

== Jewish community ==
Alexander Vinnikov is Jewish. His family arrived in the Jewish Autonomous Oblast in 1947 from Belarus. In 2004, as mayor, he participated in the opening of the new Chabad House and Birobidzhan Synagogue in Birobidzhan. As member of the local kehilla, during the December 2005 candle-lighting of a Hanukkah Menorah, Alexander Vinnikov lit the 'shamash' candle and passed it to the Chief Rabbi of the Jewish Autonomous Oblast and Chabad Lubavich representative, Mordechai Scheiner.

== Governor ==
According to Interfax, "Lawmakers in Russia's Jewish Autonomous Region have confirmed the appointment of Alexander Vinnikov as the region's new governor. Vinnikov, who was nominated to the post by Russian President Dmitry Medvedev on February 8, was supported by 13 deputies out of a total of 16."

== See also ==
- Jews and Judaism in the Jewish Autonomous Oblast
