= Mikhail Ivanovich Venyukov =

Russian geographer (1832–1901)

- Born: June 23, 1832; Ryazan
- Died: July 16, 1901 (aged 69); Paris
- Occupation: Geographer

Mikhail Venyukov (June 23, 1832 – July 16, 1901) was a Russian geographer and Major General.

== Biography ==
Mikhail Venyukov was born in the village of Nikitino Pronsky district of Ryazan province (now Korablin district of the Ryazan region). At the age of thirteen, he was accepted into the Cadet Corps; in 1850 he graduated with the rank of artillery ensign in the Nobility Regiment. Venyukov attended St. Petersburg University, entered the Academy of the General Staff, graduating in 1856.

In early May 1857 lieutenant Venyukov as a senior adjutant arrived at the headquarters of the troops of Eastern Siberia. Governor-General N. N. Muraviev invited Venyukov to go with him to the Amur. In his diary Veniukov wrote: "My dream to be on the Cupid, which at that time represented a major political interest, was coming true." Venyukov was entrusted with compiling topographic maps and analyzing military statistics to fully assess the political situation in the Far East with a view to its further settlement.

In St. Petersburg, he met with GI Nevelskim. On the instructions of Governor-General Veniukov, there was a land expedition along the Ussuri River. In connection with this, Nevelskoy provided the future traveler with valuable information about the Lower Amur and Ussuri regions.

In February 1858, MI Venyukov, then in Irkutsk, began preparations for his first expedition: through Ussuri, and through the Sikhote-Alin to the ocean. And on June 1, 1858, MI Venyukov and his companions—the hundredth Peshkov, the translator Maslennikov, the sergeant-officer Karmanov, the orderly and the eleven Cossacks, began their journey from Kazakevichevo, which is located next to the recently founded Khabarovka.

The 26-year-old officer walked more than 700 km from the mouth of the Ussuri to the pass through the Sikhote-Alin. Arriving at the sea, Veniukov intended to continue his journey to the Vladimir post, but he had to return along his previous route, because the Chinese living near the mouth of the Zerkalnaya River (formerly known as Tadushu) had with threats blocked the way of the expedition. During the trip he wrote an expeditionary report "Description of the Ussuri River and the lands east of it to the sea". The report gives the physical geography of the newly discovered region, presents the life of its extremely rare population and possible prospects for settlement and development. Personal circumstances forced Mikhail Ivanovich to leave Siberia.

In March 1859 Veniukov spoke in St. Petersburg at the Russian Geographical Society with a report on his trip to Ussuri . The information presented to them was highly appreciated by the audience, and in particular by the vice-president of the Petr Petrovich Semenov-Tyan-Shansky Society.

All his further work was devoted to travel with scientific purposes. In the years 1857–1863. Venyukov traveled to Amur, Ussuri, Transbaikalia, Issyk-Kul, Tien-Shan, Altai and the Caucasus. In 1861 he was promoted to the rank of Major. He then served in Poland as chairman of the commission on peasant affairs. In the years 1868–1869, he undertook a round-the-world trip, with particular attention to China and Japan.

Venyukov spent 1874 in Asiatic Turkey, and in 1876 was promoted to the rank of Major-General.

In 1877, Venyukov filed a petition for resignation from military service and was dismissed "Major-Major with uniform". In the same year he left for Paris. He lived in France, Switzerland, England, and was elected a member of the geographical societies of these countries. Veniukov traveled extensively in North Africa, Madagascar, Zanzibar, South and Central America, Norway, and Italy. These trips produced numerous printed works of a geographical and military-geographical nature. His scientific works were published by the French Academy of Sciences.

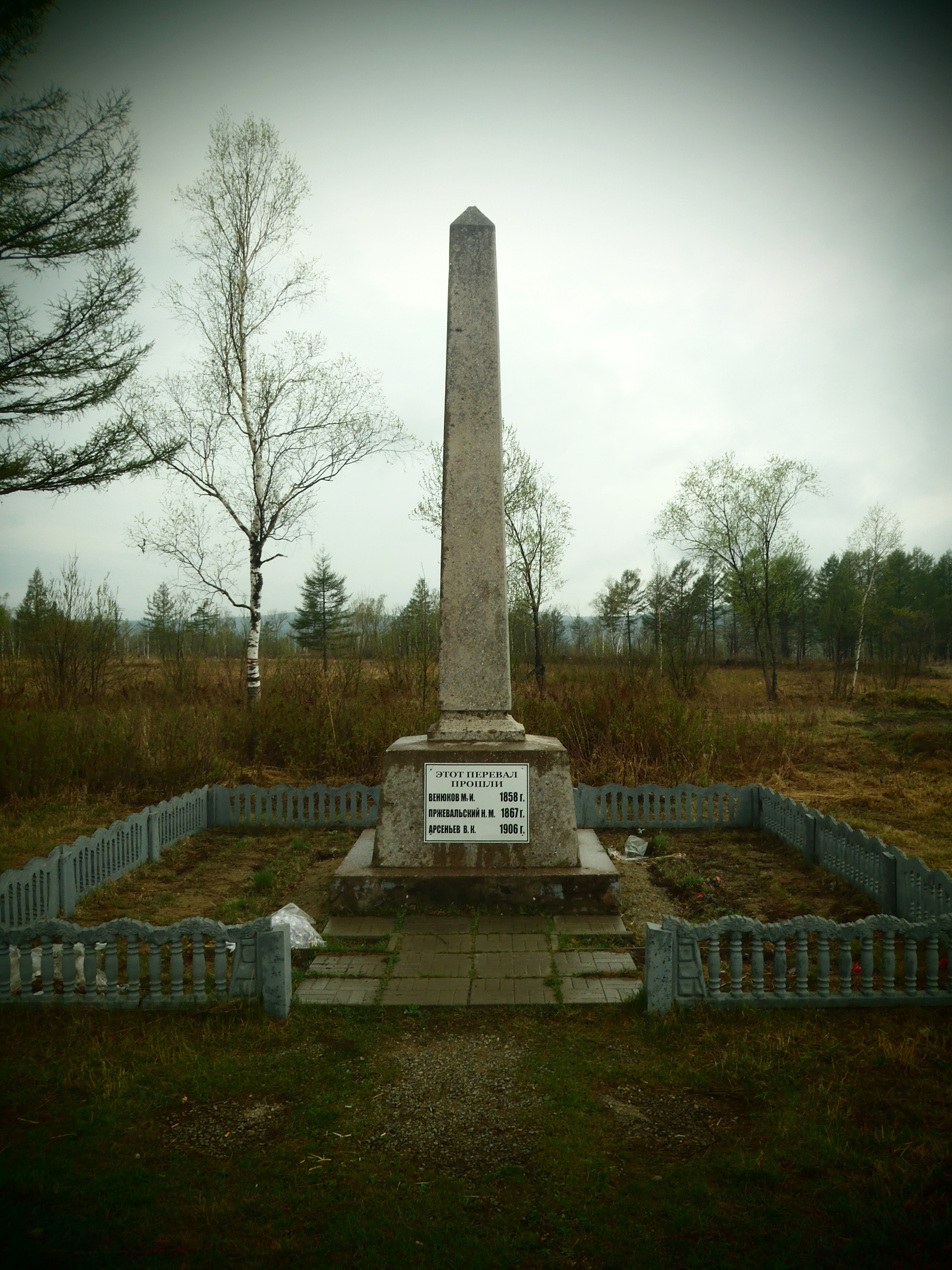
Obelisk on the Venyukov Pass

In 1878, Venyukov published an article in the Stock Exchange Gazette (1878, No. 92), in which he sharply criticized Vesin's work "On the Road to India" (Golos, 1878, No. 81). As a supporter of Justice Pyotr Pashino in the newspaper "Russian World" (1878, number 94) Venyukov delivered a letter against the article Venyukova, and refuting all the arguments on which it is based, called the act of the author of the article "indecent towards society".

The permanent secret correspondent of the "Bell" journal of AI Herzen, Vanyukov published in it letters about Siberia, the Caucasus, China, some of which were later published in a separate illegal collection.

In his will, Venyukov left his scientific library of over 1200 volumes and all his manuscripts to "the village of Khabarovka", his monetary estate to the Russian Geographical Society, the village of Nikitinsky, where he was born, and the village of Venyukovo in Ussuri, expressing the desire that these funds should be spent on educational needs.

Mikhail Ivanovich Venyukov died in Paris on July 17, 1901, and was buried, according to the will, next to the grave of Alexander Herzen in Nice.

The village of Veniukovo, of the Vyazemsky district of the Khabarovsk Territory, standing on the Ussuri River, was named in his honour, and a school in the village built using the proceeds of his will. The pass through the Sikhote-Alin Range near the village of Kavalerovo, Primorsky Krai, is also named in his honour. There is an obelisk on the pass. The Venyukovka River in the Terneysky District is likewise named in his honour.

== Selected bibliography ==
- 1 Old and New Treaties of Russia with China. - SPb., 1863. - 95 p.
- From memories. Book. 1–3. - Amsterdam, 1895–1901.
- praga-1878-1880 Historical essays of Russia from the time of the Crimean War to the conclusion of the Berlin Treaty. 1855-1878. - Leipzig; Prague, 1878–1880. - 6 tons.
- A short essay on English possessions in Asia. - SPb .: Type. V. Bezobrazov and Co., 1875.
- Materials for military geography of the southern outskirts of the Aral-Caspian lowland. - St. Petersburg., 1874.
- Review of the Japanese archipelago in its present state. Issue. 1–2. - St. Petersburg, 1871.
- Experience of military description of Russian borders in Asia. 2 issues. - St. Petersburg, 1873–1876.
- Essay on old and new treaties between Russia and China. - SPb .: Type. V. Bezobrazov and Co., 1861.
- Essays of modern China. - SPb .: Type. V. Bezobrazova and Co., 1874.
- Essays on Japan. - SPb .: Type. Imp. Acad. Sciences, 1869.
- Progressive movement of Russia in Central Asia. - SPb .: Type. V. Bezobrazova and Co., 1877.
- Travel around the outskirts of Russian Asia and notes about them. - SPb .: Type. Imp. Acad. Sciences, 1868.
- Travel through the Amur, China and Japan. / Ed., Preface. and note. A. A. Stepanova. - Khabarovsk: Khabarovsk Prince. publishing house, 1970.
- Reformed Russians. A novel in verse, but without a denouement, which is in prose. - Geneva, 1889.
- Russia and the East. Collection of geographical and political articles. - SPb .: Type. V. Bezobrazova and Co., 1877.
- Physiography. Book. 1–2. - SPb .: Type. Imp. Acad. Sciences, 1865.

== Sources ==
- Glynoytsky NP Historical sketch of the Nikolaev Academy of the General Staff. - SPb .: Type. Headquarters of the Russian Guards of the Guard and military. okr., 1882.
- Esakov, Vasily Alekseevich (2002). Mikhail Ivanovich Venyukov. Science. p. 240. ISBN 5-02-022722-6.
- Esakov, Vasily Alekseevich (1993). Russian scientists and engineers in exile. PO "Perspective". p. 192. ISBN 5-02-022722-6.
- Veniukov MI Traveling to the Amur, China and Japan
