= Tongjiang-Nizhneleninskoye railway bridge =

International railway bridge across the Amur (Heilong) River

Coordinates: 47.96°N 132.70°E

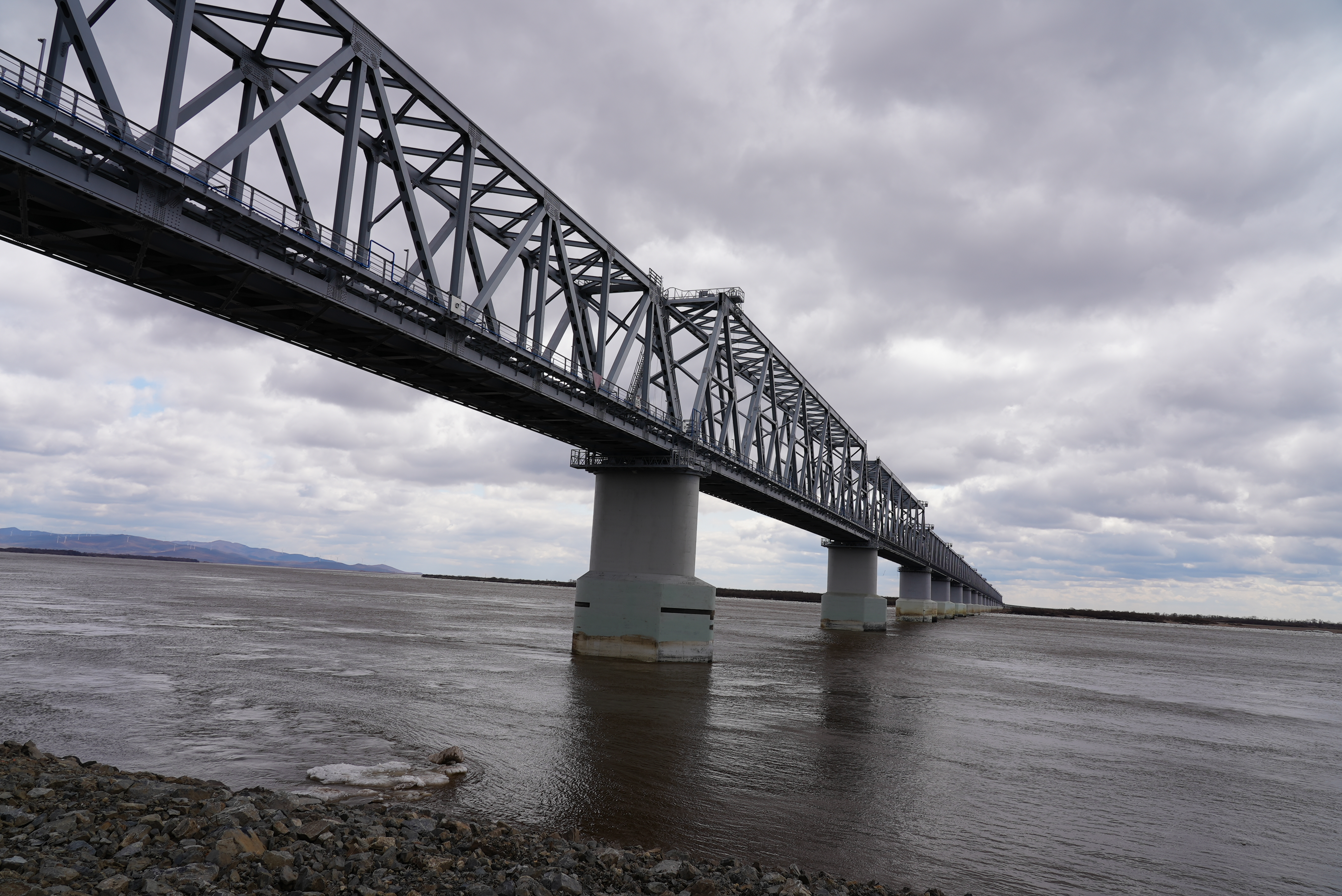
Tongjiang-Nizhneleninskoye railway bridge in April 2022

Tongjiang-Nizhneleninskoye railway bridge (Amur River Bridge) is an international Sino-Russian railroad bridge linking Nizhneleninskoye (in Russian: Нижнеленинское) in the Jewish Autonomous Oblast with Tongjiang (in Chinese: 同江) in Heilongjiang Province.

== Projected uses ==
A major use of the bridge will be to transport iron ore from the Kimkan open-pit mine in the Jewish Autonomous Oblast that is owned by IRC Limited, which is partly owned by Petropavlovsk plc. Petropavlovsk plc will participate in financing the bridge's construction. The bridge is expected to transport more than 3 million metric tons of cargo and 1.5 million passengers per year.

== History ==
In 1995, China and Russia signed an agreement to build a bridge across the Amur and Ussuri rivers.

The bridge was first proposed in 2007 by Valery Solomonovich Gurevich, the vice-chairman of the Jewish Autonomous Oblast. Gurevich said that the proposal to construct a bridge across the river was first suggested by the Russian side, in view of growing cargo transportation demands.

In 2013, the transport ministries of Russia and China signed a general construction agreement. During President Putin's visit to China in May 2014, another agreement about the construction of the bridge was signed by Russian and Chinese officials. In September 2014, Russia and China founded a joint company which will control the process of building the bridge.

In November 2014, the local Russian media reported that a significant amount of the construction work had been carried out on the Chinese part of the bridge, but hardly anything had been done on the Russian part. In June 2016, the Russian government selected SK Most Group, a well-connected private Russian company led by Ruslan Baisarov, to work on the project.

By July 2016, the Chinese portion of the bridge was finished but work had not started on the much shorter Russian portion.

In December 2016, work began on the Russian portion of the bridge.

The Russian Direct Investment Fund together with Chinese partners financed more than 70% of the construction of the Russian part of the bridge. The VEB.RF state development corporation and Russian Railways also acted as investors in the project.

Completion of structural link between the two sides of the bridge was completed in March 2019. Opening of rail traffic has been repeatedly delayed, with the December 2019 estimate being "the end of 2020", and then 3rd quarter of 2021. The bridge was finally completed on August 17, 2021, and the first Russian commercial train entered China on November 16, 2022. The launch of traffic on the bridge opened a new transport corridor between Russia and China, which removed a number of existing infrastructure restrictions. The distance for transporting goods to the northern provinces of China has been reduced by more than 700 km compared to existing routes.

== Design ==
The bridge was designed by Russia's Giprostroymost institute, satisfying both Russian and Chinese standards. In 2014, it was reported that the main structure over the Amur River runs north-south and will consist of 20 110-meter steel through-truss spans. The bridge will have both a standard gauge (1435 mm) track and a Russian gauge (1520 mm) track. However, the two tracks will be offset by only 800 mm, so that only one track can be used at any given time.

== See also ==
- Khabarovsk Bridge
- List of international bridges
