= Nizhneleninskoye =

Nizhneleninskoye Нижнеленинское
- Selo
- Location within Jewish Autonomous Oblast Location within Russia
- Coordinates: 47°57′45″N 132°40′08″E
- Country: Russia
- Region: Jewish Autonomous Oblast
- District: Leninsky District

Population
  - Total: 212
- Time zone: UTC+10:00 (VLAT)
- Postal code: 679389

Nizhneleninskoye (Russian: Нижнеле́нинское) is a rural locality (a selo) in Leninsky District of the Jewish Autonomous Oblast. Located on the Amur River, Nizhneleninskoye is the location for the Tongjiang-Nizhneleninskoye railway bridge which crosses over the river to China, joining it by a railway bridge to Tongjiang in Heilongjiang Province.

== Tongjiang-Nizhneleninskoye railway bridge ==
The Tongjiang-Nizhneleninskoye railway bridge was proposed in 2007 by Valery Solomonovich Gurevich, the vice-chairman of the Jewish Autonomous Oblast in Russia. The railway bridge over the Amur River will connect Tongjiang with Nizhneleninskoye, a village in the Jewish Autonomous Oblast.

The Chinese portion of the bridge was finished in July 2016. In December 2016, work began on the Russian portion of the bridge in December 2016. The bridge was expected to open in October 2019 but was delayed to late 2021, finally opening on August 17, 2021.
