= Khabarovka =

Khabarovka Хабаровка
- Selo
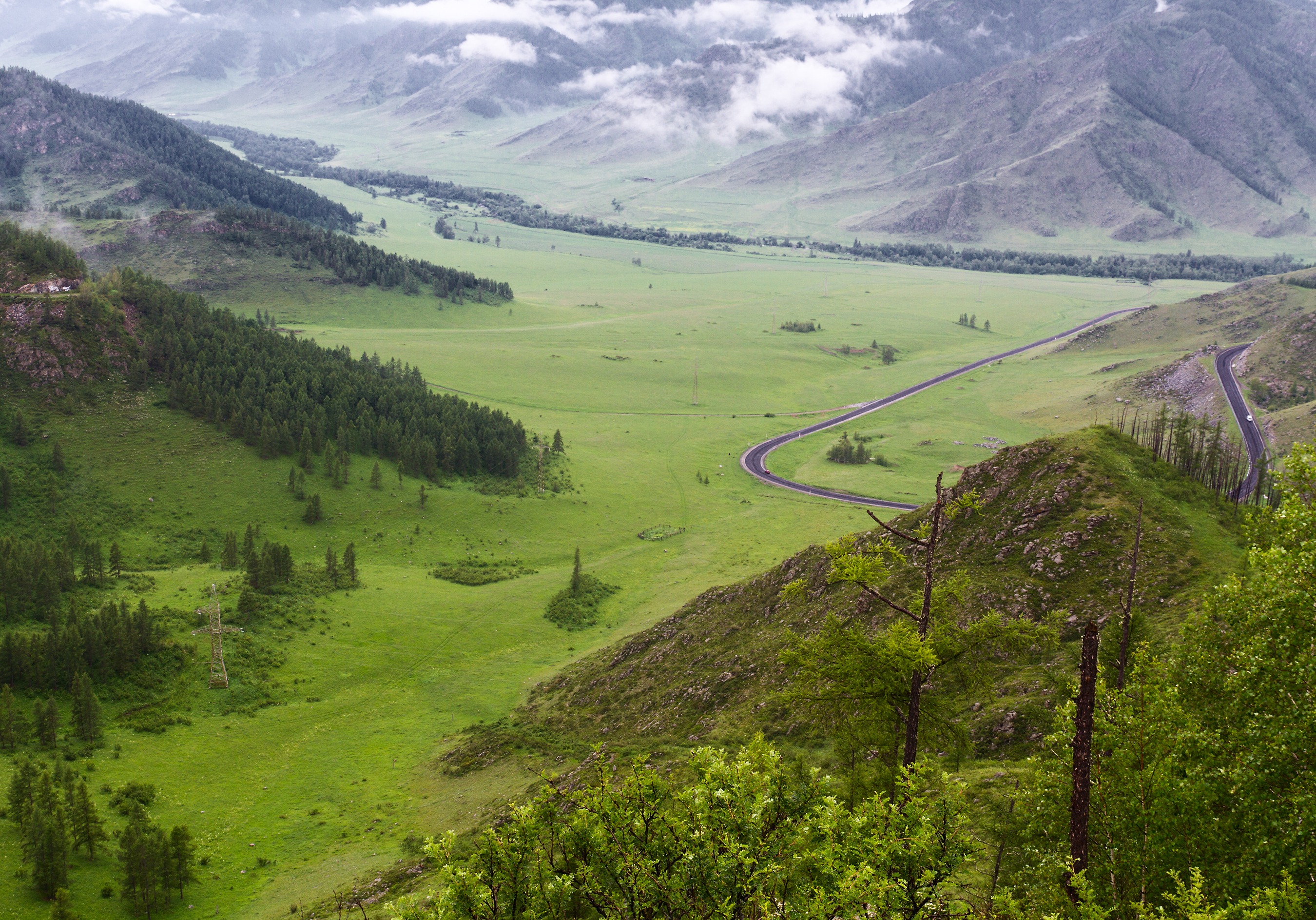
- View of the village (in the background) from the chike-taman pass

- Location within Altai Republic Location within Russia
- Coordinates: 50°41′N 86°17′E
- Country: Russia
- Region: Altai Republic
- District: Ongudaysky District
- Time zone: UTC+7:00

Khabarovka (Russian: Хабаровка; Altay: Ӱлегем, Ülegem) is a rural locality (a selo) and the administrative centre of Khabarovskoye Rural Settlement, Ongudaysky District, the Altai Republic, Russia. The population was 274 as of 2016. There are 4 streets.

== Geography ==
Khabarovka is located 18 km southeast of Onguday (the district's administrative centre) by road. Ulita is the nearest rural locality.
