= Beit T'shuva =

Synagogue in Birobidzhan, Jewish Autonomous Oblast, Russia

Beit T'shuva Synagogue
- Russian: Синагога Бейт-Тшува
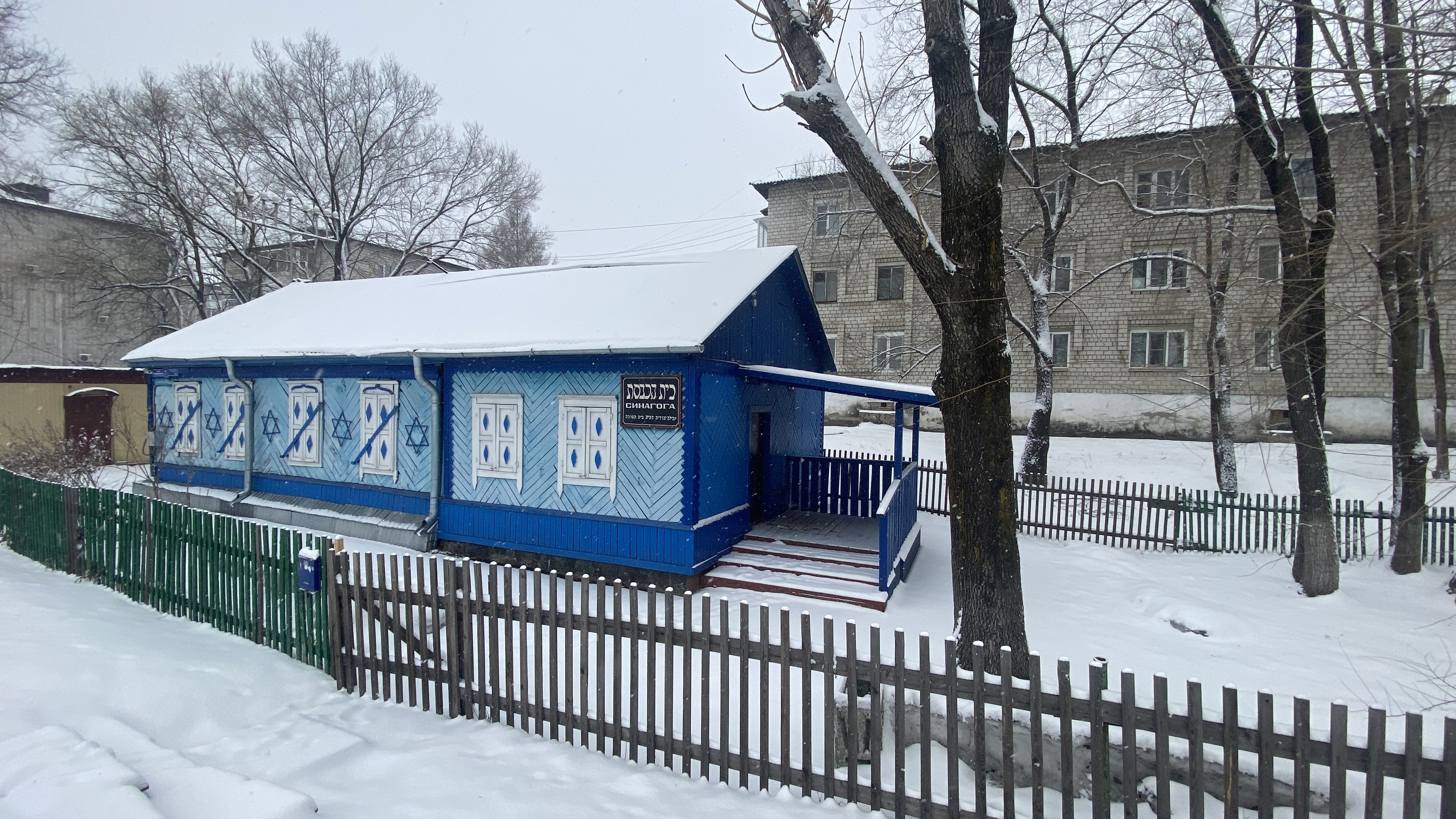
- The synagogue in 2023

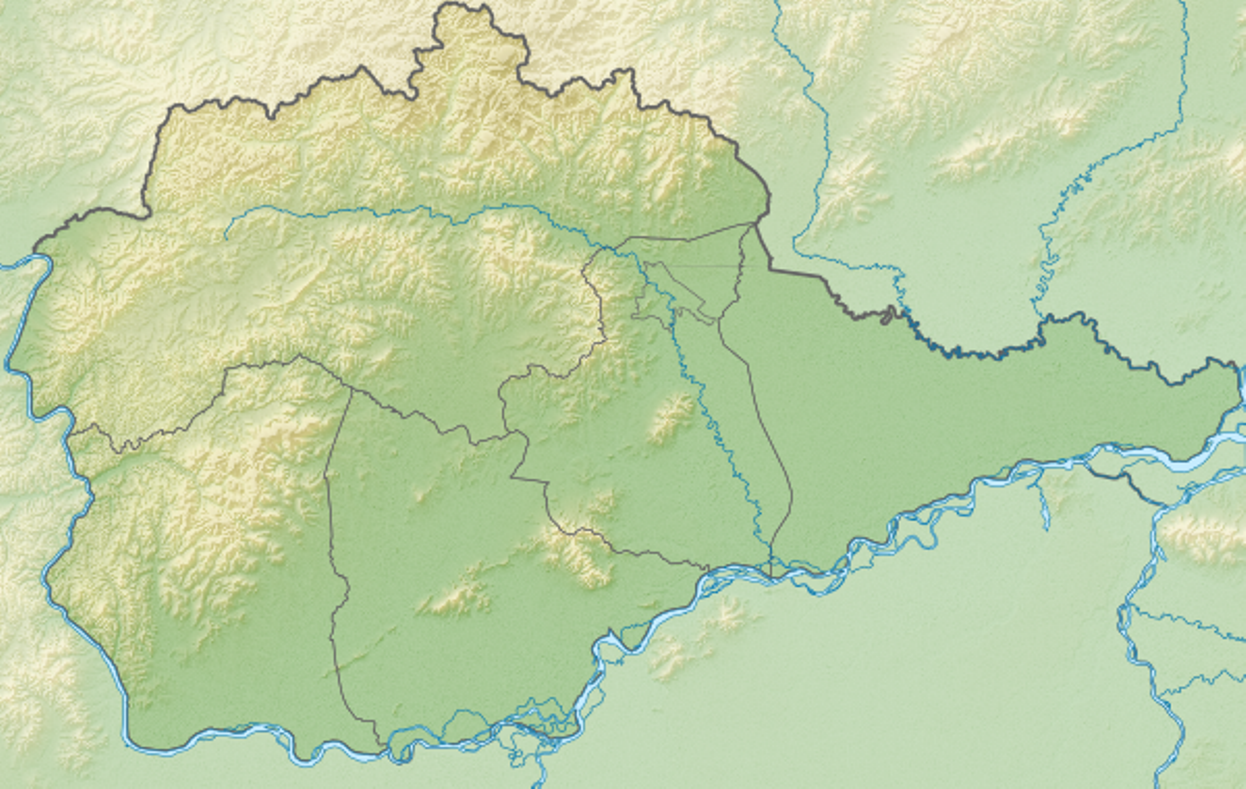
- Location of the synagogue in the Jewish Autonomous Oblast

Religion
- Affiliation: Judaism
- Ecclesiastical or organizational status: Synagogue
- Status: Active

Location
- Location: 7 Mayakovskogo Street, Birobidzhan, Jewish Autonomous Oblast
- Country: Russia
- Interactive map of Beit T'shuva Synagogue
- Coordinates: 48°46′44″N 132°56′38″E

Architecture
- Type: Synagogue architecture
- Style: Wooden synagogue
- Completed: 1986
- Materials: Timber

The Beit T'shuva Synagogue (Russian: Синагога Бейт-Тшува, romanized: Sinagoga Beyt-Tshuva) is a Jewish congregation and synagogue, located at 7 Mayakovskogo Street, in the city of Birobidzhan, in the Jewish Autonomous Oblast of Russia.

== History ==
The oldest synagogue in the city, established in 1986, it is sometimes referred to as "Birobidzhan's old synagogue". While for years, the congregation's religious services included a blend of Christian and Jewish traditions, in 2005, under its leader of many years, Rabbi Boris "Dov" Kaufman, it underwent a transformation to become a "strictly Jewish" synagogue without any Christian influence.

The synagogue, known for its warmth and quaintness, is located in a small Siberian-style wooden house. In 2010, The Christian Science Monitor reported that "nowhere are the ties between Jews and non-Jews here clearer than in Birobidzhan's tiny second synagogue, located on the outskirts of the city." The Monitor went on to convey a scene to back-up its claim:

It is Sabbath and it could be a 19th-century Jewish village were it not for the phone in the corner. The building is no more than 40 paces long, with low ceilings and a tin roof. A dozen mostly middle-aged parishioners sit on benches, a simple curtain separating men from women. The rabbi, Dov Kofman, an affable man who walks with a cane, says when the ceremony is over: "I love Israel, my son is now there serving in the army, but this is my fatherland." Suddenly a non-Jewish neighbor stops by to say hello, sitting down on one of the benches. An engineer by training, Yevgeni Stolbov oversaw the construction of most of Birobidzhan, and is now retired. "I love coming here, I would do anything to help this synagogue, it's part of my life and want to see it here forever," he says as his friend, the rabbi, looks on with a smile.

== See also ==
- History of the Jews in the Jewish Autonomous Oblast
- List of synagogues in Russia
