= Lechaim =

Russian Jewish magazine

Lechaim (Лехаим) is the flagship magazine of the Federation of Jewish Communities of the CIS (FJC).

== History and profile ==
Lechaim was founded in 1991. It is printed monthly in Russian, with sections on news, memoirs, Torah studies, Jewish culture and art, literature and interviews. Most of the content is also available online.
