= Sholem Aleichem Amur State University =

Public university in Birobidzhan, Jewish Autonomous Oblast, Russia

- Приамурский государственный университет имени Шолом-Алейхема
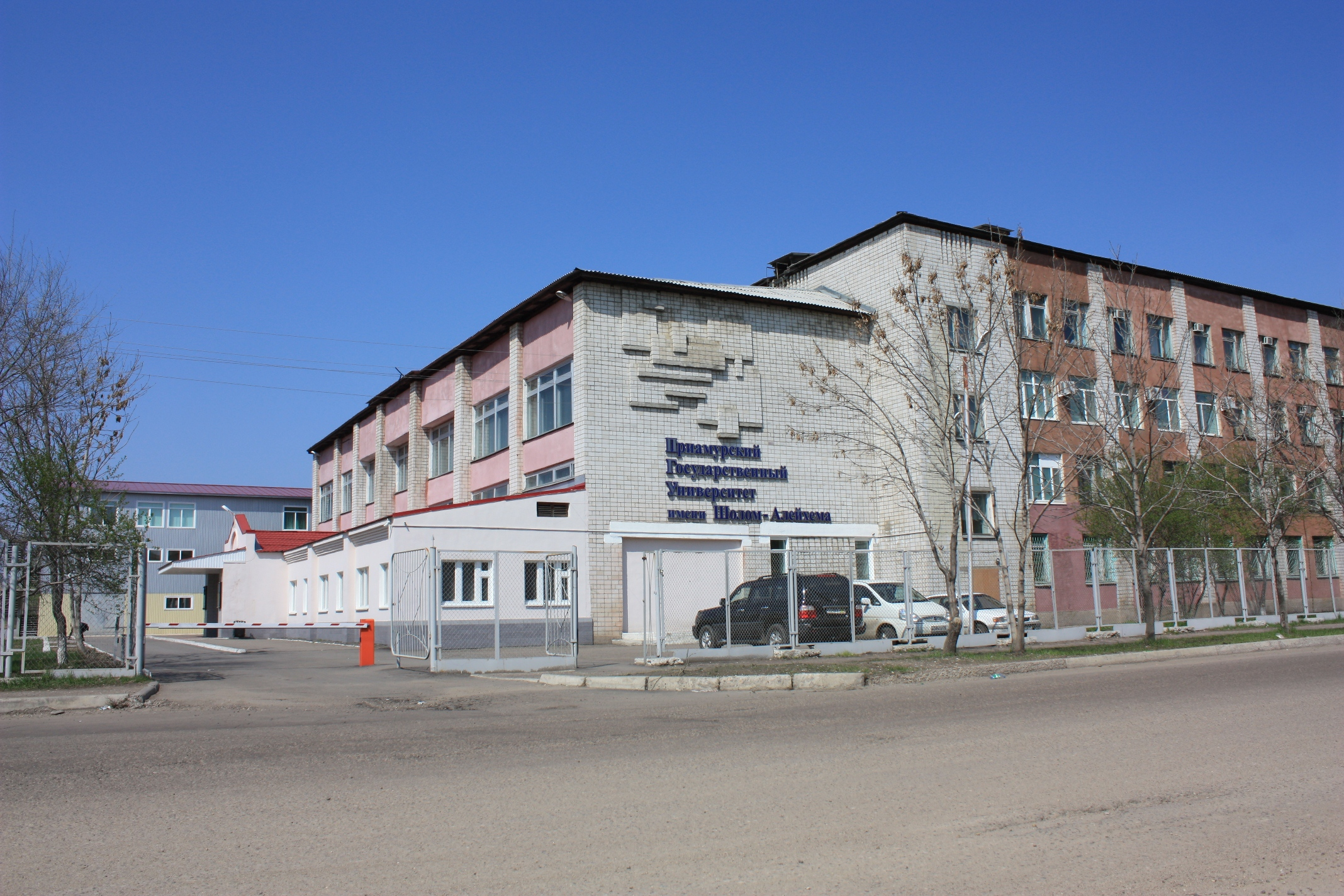
- Type: Public
- Location: 70 Shirokaya str., Birobidzhan, Russia; 48.773216°N 132.941329°E
- Campus: Urban
- Website: www.pgusa.ru

Sholem Aleichem Amur State University (Russian: Приамурский государственный университет имени Шолом-Алейхема), formerly Birobidzhan State Pedagogical Institute, is a university in Russia. This is the only university based in the Jewish Autonomous Oblast. It is named after Jewish-Russian author Sholem Aleichem.

== History ==
The Sholom Aleichem Amur State University was founded in 1989 as the Birobidzhan State Pedagogical Institute. In 2005, it became the Far Eastern State Social and Humanitarian Academy, and in 2011, it was accredited as a university, receiving its current name.

In 2007, the first Birobidzhan International Summer Program for Yiddish Language and Culture was launched by Boris Kotlerman, a Yiddish studies professor at Bar-Ilan University. Yiddish is still the region's second official language after Russian, although it is spoken only by a handful of 4,000 remaining Jews. This program includes a workshop on the village of Valdgeym and its Yiddish heritage.

== Overview ==
The university works in cooperation with the local Jewish community of Birobidzhan and the Birobidzhan Orthodox Synagogue. It is unique in the Russian Far East. The basis of the training courses is study of the Hebrew language, history and classic Jewish texts.

The university addresses the growth of interest Jewish Autonomous Oblast in its Jewish roots. Students study Hebrew and Yiddish at the Jewish school and Birobidzhan Jewish National University in order to leave the Oblast in favour of Israel. In 1989, the Jewish Center founded a Sunday school, where children can study Yiddish, learn Jewish dances, and history of Israel. The Israeli government helps fund this program.

== See also ==
- Jews and Judaism in the Jewish Autonomous Oblast
