= Mordechai Scheiner =

Israeli rabbi

Mordechai Sheiner (Hebrew: מרדכי שיינר; Russian: Мордеха́й Шейнер) is an Israeli Orthodox rabbi associated with the Chabad Hasidic movement. Sheiner served as Chief Rabbi of Jewish Autonomous Oblast from 2002 to 2011.

== Background ==
Mordechai Sheiner came to the Jewish Autonomous Oblast in 2002. He arrived in Birobidzhan as a 30-year-old rabbi from Israel. He had never been to Birobidzhan before, but spoke Russian thanks to two years he spent in Ukraine, working at another synagogue. He was also the leader of the Birobidzhan Synagogue and led the local Jewish community with Lev Toitman, until Toitman's death in 2007.

== On Judaism in the JAO ==
Concerning the status of Judaism in the Jewish Autonomous Oblast, Sheiner has stated, "Jewish life is reviving, both in quantity and quality." In 2006, Rabbi Scheiner visited the villages of Bira (Jewish Autonomous Oblast), Naifeld, Londoko, Birakan and Birofeld with the Jewish Community of Birobidzhan. Together they inspected local cemeteries and gathered information about the Jews buried there in the years prior to World War II . The names of these individuals are listed in the Memory Book in the Birobidzhan Synagogue. The dates of birth and death are written down according to the Hebrew calendar as well as the modern calendar. As of 2007, some of the original Jewish settlers were still present in these villages.

== Yiddish and Jewish education in JAO ==
Sheiner has also noted that the Birobidzhaner Shtern still publishes twice weekly, but now mostly in Russian with just two pages a week in Yiddish. In recent years, the Jewish Autonomous Oblast has grown interested in its Jewish roots. Students study Hebrew and Yiddish at a Jewish school and Birobidzhan Jewish National University. In 1989, the Jewish center founded its Sunday school, where children study Yiddish, learn folk Jewish dance, and learn about the history of Israel. The Israeli government helps fund the program.

Sheiner has commented the progress at School No. 2, Birobidjan's Jewish public school with 670 students, 30 percent of whom are Jewish. Pupils learn about Jewish history, and the Hebrew and Yiddish languages. The Birobidzhan Jewish National University works in cooperation with the local Jewish Community of Birobidzhan. The university is unique in the Russian Far East. The basis of the training course is study of the Hebrew language, history and classic Jewish texts.

Rabbi Scheiner also hosted the television show Yiddishkeit, which began in 2005.
