= Valdgeym =

Village in Birobidzhansky District, Jewish Autonomous Oblast, Russia

Coordinates: 48°43′N 132°54′E

Valdgeym (Russian: Валдгейм; Yiddish: װאלדהײם, Valdheym; German: Waldheim) is a rural locality (a selo) in Birobidzhansky District of the Jewish Autonomous Oblast, Russia. Valdgeym was the place where the first collective farm was established in the Jewish Autonomous Oblast. As of 1992, Valdgeym was the largest farming cooperative in the region.

== Etymology ==
The name is Yiddish, meaning "forest + home."

== History ==
Valdgeym was founded in 1928 by a group of Jewish settlers from the areas of modern Lithuania, Latvia, and Poland. In 1929, Valdgeym's first school was established with all subjects taught in Yiddish. Among the founders was L. Geffen, who, with his family, fled a small shtetl near Wilno, Lithuania. In 2004, his son Zyama Geffen, age 83, still lived on the Valdgeym collective farm that his father founded. Zyama was six years old when his father moved to the area in 1928.

In 1980, a Yiddish school was opened in the settlement. During the early 20th century, Soviet Chairman of the Central Executive Committee Mikhail Kalinin desired that Valdgeym and other localities of the Jewish Autonomous Oblast become new centres of Jewish life of the Soviet Union.

== See also ==
- Jews and Judaism in the Jewish Autonomous Oblast
