= Federation of Jewish Communities of the CIS =

Jewish cultural organisation in the Commonwealth of Independent States

- Founded: August 1, 1997; 28 years ago
- Tax ID no.: 13-3970940
- Legal status: 501(c)(3) nonprofit organization
- Location(s): Moscow, Russia; New York City, United States
- Services: Provides programming and funding to member Jewish umbrella organizations in fifteen countries through the former Soviet Union and United States.
- Director: David Mondshine
- Director: Berel Lazar
- Director: Shlomo Peles
- Revenue: $33,871,857 (2013)
- Expenses: $20,778,659 (2013)
- Employees: 8 (2012)
- Website: fjc-fsu.org

Federation of Jewish Communities of the CIS (FJC) is a Jewish organisation dedicated to restoring Jewish life, culture and religion in the Commonwealth of Independent States (CIS), the former Soviet Union. The FJC was founded on August 1, 1997, with sponsorship of Ohr Avner Foundation.

Current heads of the organization are:

- Lev Leviev, President of FJC of the CIS
- Rabbi Berel Lazar, chief rabbi of Russia, head of Union of Rabbis of CIS

Its headquarters is in Moscow, Russia, and it has an office in New York City in the United States.

FJC have a total of 454 affiliated member communities throughout the former USSR.

In 2009 there were 171 member communities of FJC in Russia.

Haaretz and several other sources maintain that it is a pro-Putin organization, established to counter the Russian Jewish Congress formed by Vladimir Gusinsky in 1996, which was sometimes critical of Putin.

== See also ==
- Lechaim magazine
- Russian Jewish Congress
- Union of Councils for Soviet Jews
- Congress of the Jewish Religious Organizations and Associations in Russia
