= Jewish Autonomous Oblast =

Federal subject of the Russian Federation in the Russian Far East

Jewish Autonomous Oblast Еврейская автономная область (Russian)
- Autonomous oblast

Other transcription(s)
  - Yiddish: ייִדישע אװטאָנאָמע געגנט
- Flag Coat of arms

- Coordinates: 48°36′N 132°12′E
- Country: Russia
- Federal district: Far Eastern
- Economic region: Far Eastern
- Established: 7 May 1934
- Administrative center: Birobidzhan

Government
  - Body: Legislative Assembly
  - Governor: Maria Kostyuk

Area
  - Total: 36,271 km^{2} (14,004 sq mi)
  - Rank: 61st

Population (2021 census)
  - Total: 150,453
  - Estimate (2018): 162,014
  - Rank: 80th
  - Density: 4.1480/km^{2} (10.743/sq mi)
  - Urban: 70.8%
  - Rural: 29.2%

GDP (nominal, 2024)
  - Total: ₽102 billion (US$1.2 billion)
  - Per capita: ₽697,097 (US$8,179.87)
- Time zone: UTC+10 (MSK+7)
- ISO 3166 code: RU-YEV
- License plates: 79
- OKTMO ID: 99000000
- Official languages: Russian
- Recognised languages: Yiddish
- Website: www.eao.ru

The Jewish Autonomous Oblast (JAO) (Note: Russian: Еврейская автономная область (ЕАО), romanized: Yevreyskaya avtonomnaya oblast IPA: [jɪˈvrʲejskəjə ɐftɐˈnomnəjə ˈobləsʲtʲ (ˌje‿ˌa‿ˈo)]; Yiddish: ייִדישע אװטאָנאָמע געגנט, romanized: Yidishe Avtonome Gegnt, IPA: [ˈjɪdɪʃə avtɔˈnɔmə ˈɡɛɡn̩t]; Standard Yiddish: ייִדישע אױטאָנאָמע געגנט, romanized: Yidishe Oytonome Gegnt, IPA: [ˈjɪdɪʃə ɔɪtɔˈnɔmə ˈɡɛɡn̩t]) is a federal subject of Russia in the far east of the country, bordering Khabarovsk Krai and Amur Oblast in Russia and Heilongjiang province in China. Its administrative center is the town of Birobidzhan.

The JAO was designated by a Soviet official decree in 1928, and officially established in 1934. At its height, in the late 1940s, the Jewish population in the region peaked around 46,000–50,000, approximately 25% of its population. Since then, the share of Jews steadily declined, climaxing in the 1990s post-Soviet aliyah to Israel, and according to the 2021 Russian census, there were only 837 ethnic Jews left in the JAO (0.6%).

Article 65 of the Constitution of Russia provides that the JAO is Russia's only autonomous oblast. It is one of two officially Jewish jurisdictions in the world, the other being the State of Israel. It is one of the few places in the world where Yiddish is a recognized minority language.

== History ==
=== Background ===
==== Annexation of the Amur Region by Russia ====
Prior to 1858, the area of what is today the Jewish Autonomous Oblast was ruled by a succession of Chinese imperial dynasties. In 1858, the northern bank of the Amur River, including the territory of today's Jewish Autonomous Oblast, was split away from the Qing Chinese territory of Manchuria and became incorporated into the Russian Empire pursuant to the Treaty of Aigun (1858) and the Convention of Peking (1860).

==== Military colonization ====
In December 1858, the Russian government authorized the formation of the Amur Cossack Host to protect the south-east boundary of Siberia and communications on the Amur and Ussuri rivers. This military colonization included settlers from Transbaikalia. Between 1858 and 1882, many settlements consisting of wooden houses were founded.

Expeditions of scientists, including geographers, ethnographers, naturalists, and botanists such as Mikhail Ivanovich Venyukov, Leopold von Schrenck, Karl Maximovich, Gustav Radde, and Vladimir Leontyevich Komarov promoted research in the area. It is estimated that as many as 40,000 men from the Russian military moved into the region.

==== Soviet policies regarding Jews ====
Although Judaism as a religion ran counter to the Bolshevik party's policy of atheism and there was a crackdown on organized Jewish communities by closing synagogues and harassing believers, Vladimir Lenin also wanted to appease minority groups to gain their support and provide examples of tolerance.

In 1924, the unemployment rate among Jews exceeded 30 percent, as a result of USSR policies against private property ownership, which prohibited them from being craftspeople and small business owners as many had been prior to the revolution. With the goal of getting Jews back to work to be more productive members of society, the government established Komzet, the committee for the agricultural settlement of Jews. The Soviet government entertained the idea of resettling all Jews in the USSR in a designated territory where they would be able to pursue a lifestyle that was "socialist in content and national in form". The Russians also wanted to offer an alternative to Zionism, the establishment of the Mandate of Palestine as a Jewish homeland. Socialist Zionists such as Ber Borochov were gaining followers at that time, and Zionism was the favored ideology in the world's political economy to the Yiddish interpretations, which were essentially incompatible with the USSR because of the Yiddish movement's growing opposition (e.g. Emma Goldman) to the very ethno-nationalism which constituted and structured Soviet states.

Crimea was initially considered in the early 1920s, when it already had a significant Jewish population. Two Jewish districts (raiony) were formed in Crimea and three in south Ukraine. However, an alternative scheme, perceived as more advantageous, was put into practice.

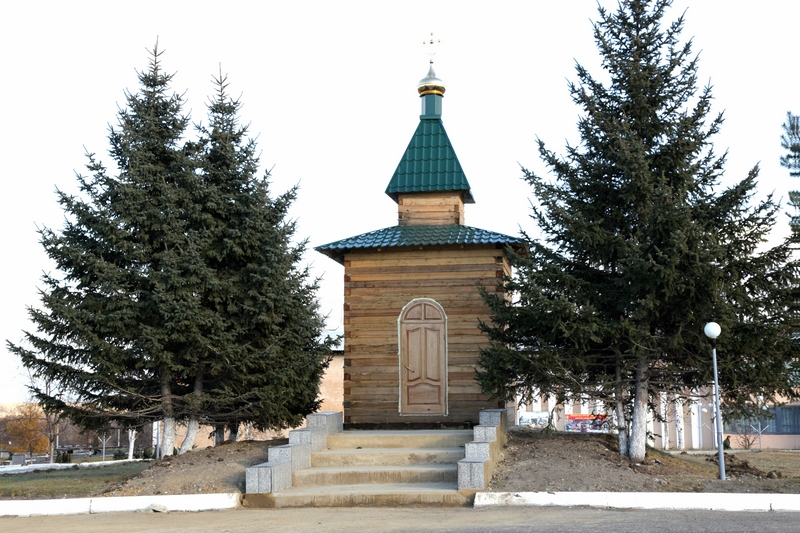
The Chapel of St. Dmitry Donskoy

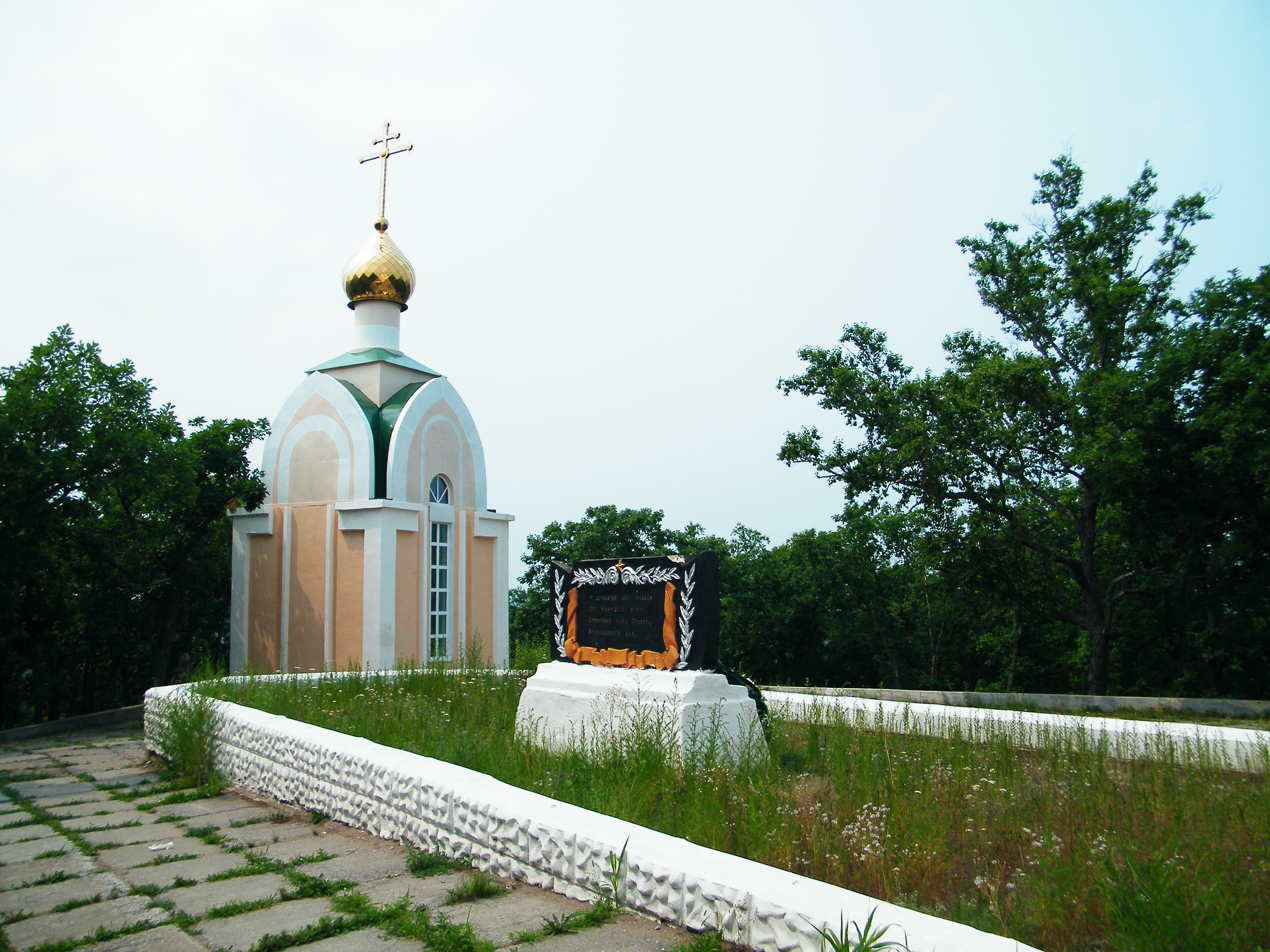
A monument to the Battle of Volochayevka

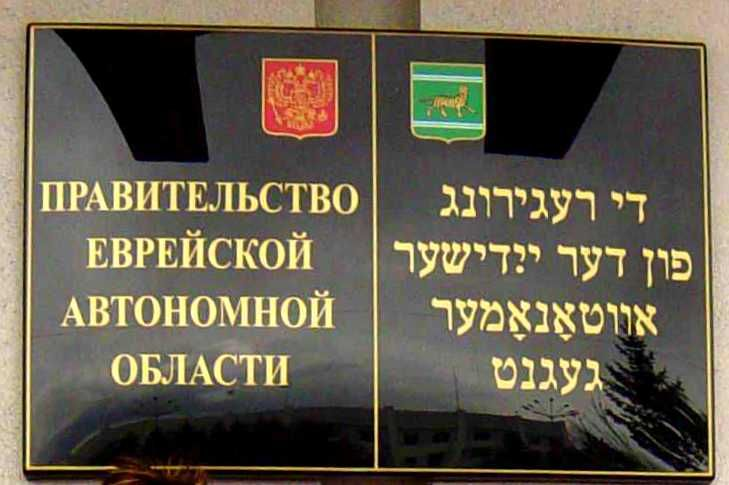
A Yiddish-Russian sign on the JAO government headquarters

=== Early history ===
==== Establishment ====
Eventually, Birobidzhan, in what is now the JAO, was chosen by the Soviet leadership as the site for the Jewish region. The choice of this area was a surprise to Komzet; the area had been chosen for military and economic reasons. This area was often infiltrated by China, while Japan also wanted Russia to lose the provinces of the Soviet Far East. At the time, there were only about 30,000 inhabitants in the area, mostly descendants of Trans-Baikal Cossacks resettled there by tsarist authorities, Koreans, Kazakhs, and the Tungusic peoples. The Soviet government wanted to increase settlement in the remote Russian Far East, especially along the vulnerable border with China. General Pavel Sudoplatov writes about the government's rationale behind picking the area in the Far East:

The establishment of the Jewish Autonomous Oblast in Birobidzhan in 1928 was ordered by Stalin only as an effort to strengthen the Far Eastern border region with an outpost, not as a favour to the Jews. The area was constantly penetrated by Chinese and White Russian resistance groups, and the idea was to shield the territory by establishing a settlement whose inhabitants would be hostile to white Russian émigrés, especially the Cossacks. The status of this region was defined shrewdly as an autonomous district, not an autonomous republic, which meant that no local legislature, high court, or government post of ministerial rank was permitted. It was an autonomous area, but a bare frontier, not a political center.

On 28 March 1928, the Presidium of the General Executive Committee of the USSR passed the decree "On the attaching for Komzet of free territory near the Amur River in the Russian Far East for settlement of the working Jews". The decree meant "a possibility of establishment of a Jewish administrative territorial unit on the territory of said region".

The new territory was initially called the Birobidzhan Jewish National Raion.

Birobidzhan had a harsh geography and climate: it was mountainous, covered with virgin forests of oak, pine and cedar, and also swamplands, and any new settlers would have to build their lives from scratch. To make colonization more enticing, the Soviet government allowed private land ownership. This led to many non-Jews settling in the oblast to get a free farm.

In the spring of 1928, 654 Jews arrived to settle in the area; however, by October 1928, 49.7% of them had left because of the severe conditions. In the summer of 1928, there were torrential rains that flooded the crops and an outbreak of anthrax that killed the cattle.

On 7 May 1934, the Presidium of the General Executive Committee accepted the decree on its transformation into the Jewish Autonomous Region within the Russian Soviet Federative Socialist Republic. In 1938, with the formation of the Khabarovsk Territory, the Jewish Autonomous Region (JAR) was included in its structure.

==== Growth of Jewish communities in the early 1930s ====
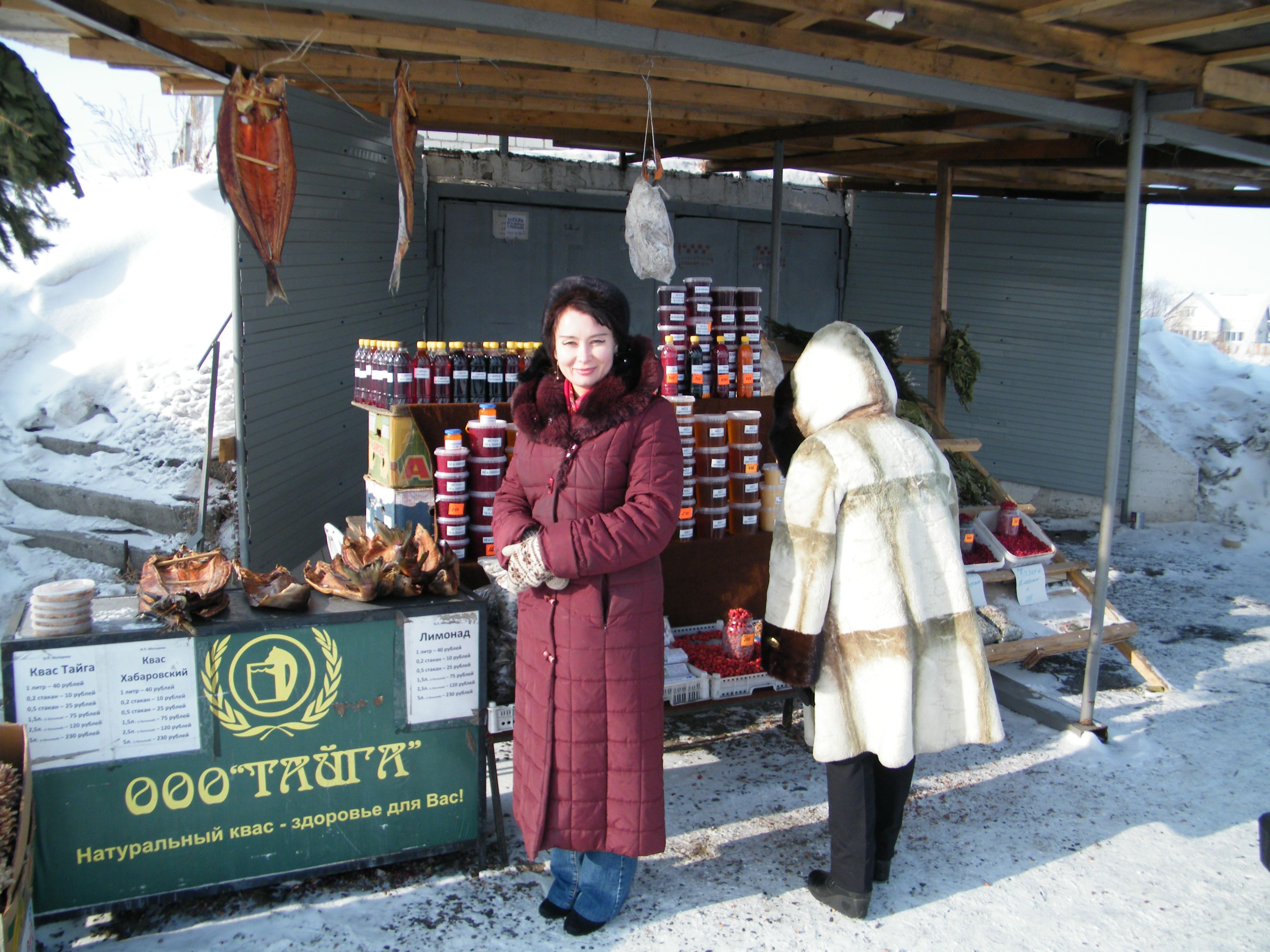
Market near the village of Nikolaevka

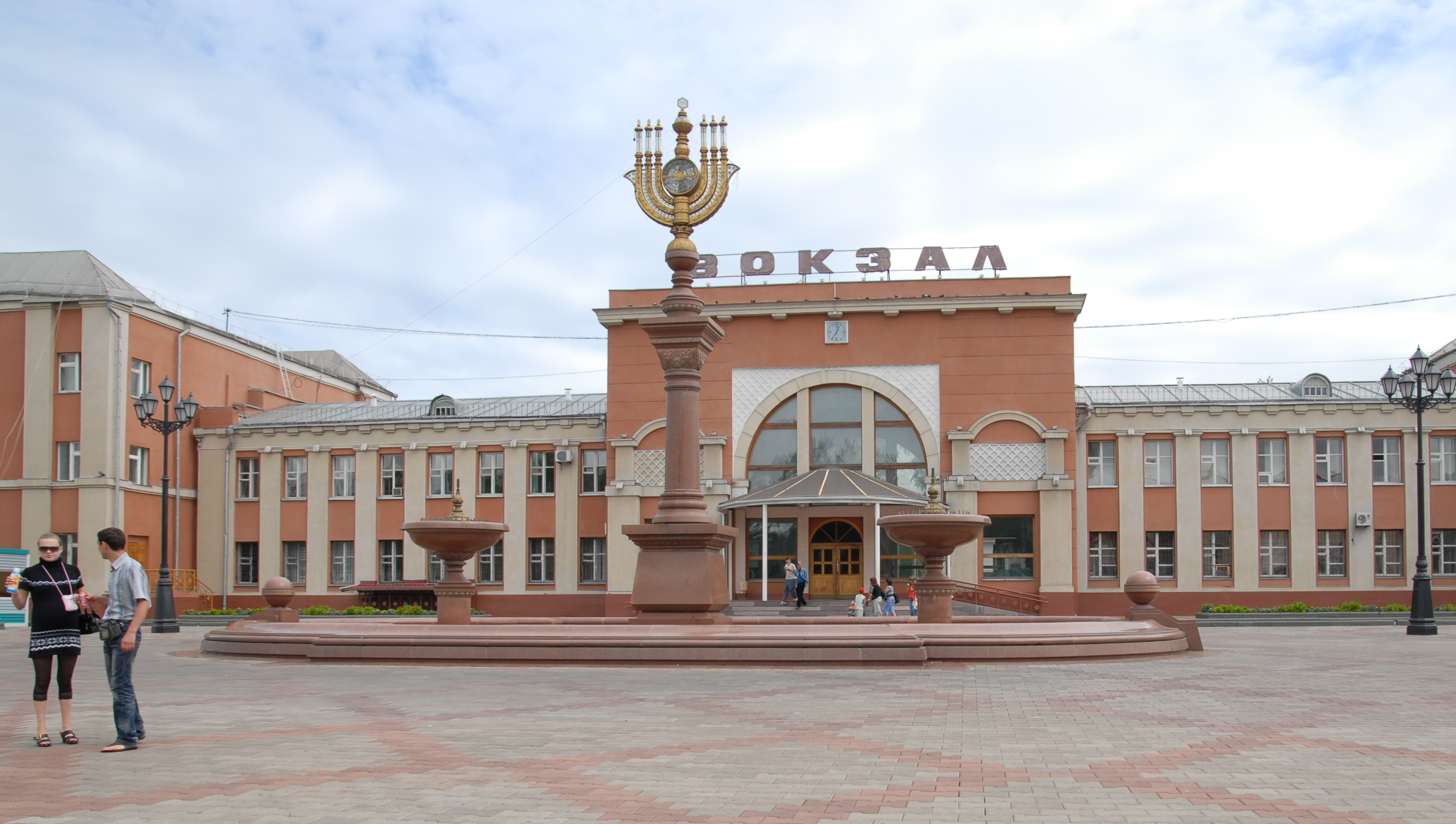
A menorah dominates the front of Birobidzhan's railway station.

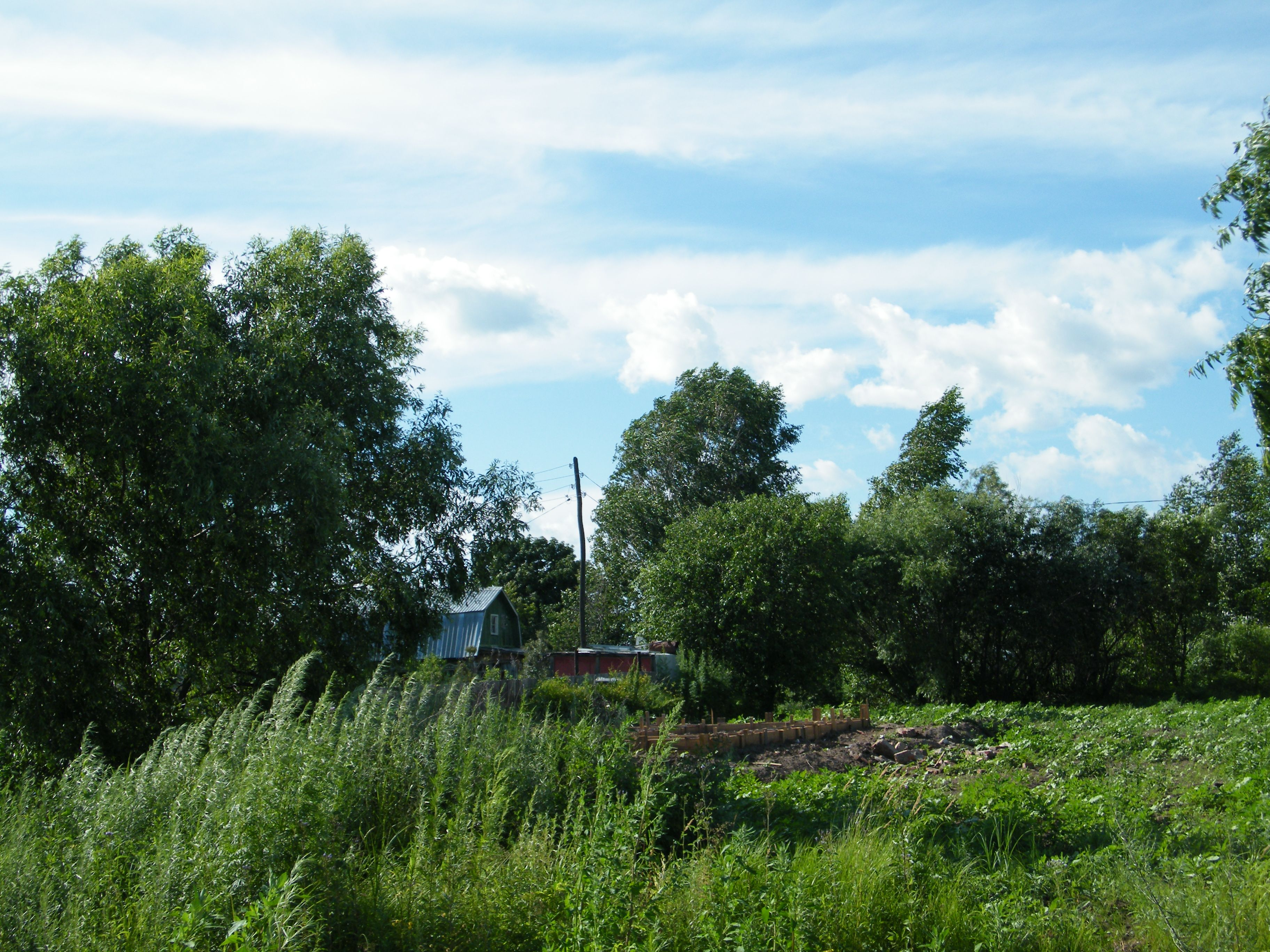
Vladimirovka village

In the 1930s, a Soviet promotional campaign was created to entice more Jewish settlers to move there. The campaign partly incorporated the standard Soviet promotional tools of the era, including posters and Yiddish-language novels describing a socialist utopia there. In one instance, leaflets promoting Birobidzhan were dropped from an airplane over a Jewish neighborhood in Belarus. In another instance, a government-produced Yiddish film called Seekers of Happiness told the story of a Jewish family from overseas making a new life for itself in Birobidzhan.

Early Jewish settlements included Valdgeym, dating from 1928, which included the first collective farm established in the oblast, Amurzet, which was the center of Jewish settlement south of Birobidzhan from 1929 to 1939, and Smidovich.

The Organization for Jewish Colonisation in the Soviet Union, a Jewish Communist organization in North America, successfully encouraged the immigration of some US residents, such as the family of the future spy George Koval, which arrived in 1932. Some 1,200 non-Soviet Jews chose to settle in Birobidzhan.

As the Jewish population grew, so did the impact of Yiddish culture on the region. The settlers established a Yiddish newspaper, the Birobidzhaner Shtern; a theatre troupe was created; and streets being built in the new city were named after prominent Yiddish authors such as Sholom Aleichem and I. L. Peretz.

==== Stalin era and World War II ====
The Jewish population of JAO reached a pre-war peak of 20,000 in 1937. According to the 1939 population census, 17,695 Jews lived in the region (16% of the total population).

After the war ended in 1945, there was renewed interest in the idea of Birobidzhan as a potential home for Jewish refugees. The Jewish population in the region peaked at around 46,000–50,000 Jews in 1948, around 25% of the entire population of the JAO.

==== Cold War ====
The census of 1959 found that the Jewish population of the JAO had declined by approximately 50%, down to 14,269 people.

A synagogue was opened at the end of World War II, but it closed in the mid-1960s after a fire left it severely damaged.

In 1980, a Yiddish school was opened in Valdgeym.

In 1987, the reformist Soviet government led by Mikhail Gorbachev pardoned many political prisoners and told the American Jewish community that it would allow the emigration of 11,000 Jewish refuseniks. According to the 1989 Soviet census, there were 8,887 Jews living in the JAO, or 4% of the total JAO population of 214,085.

=== Post-Soviet history ===
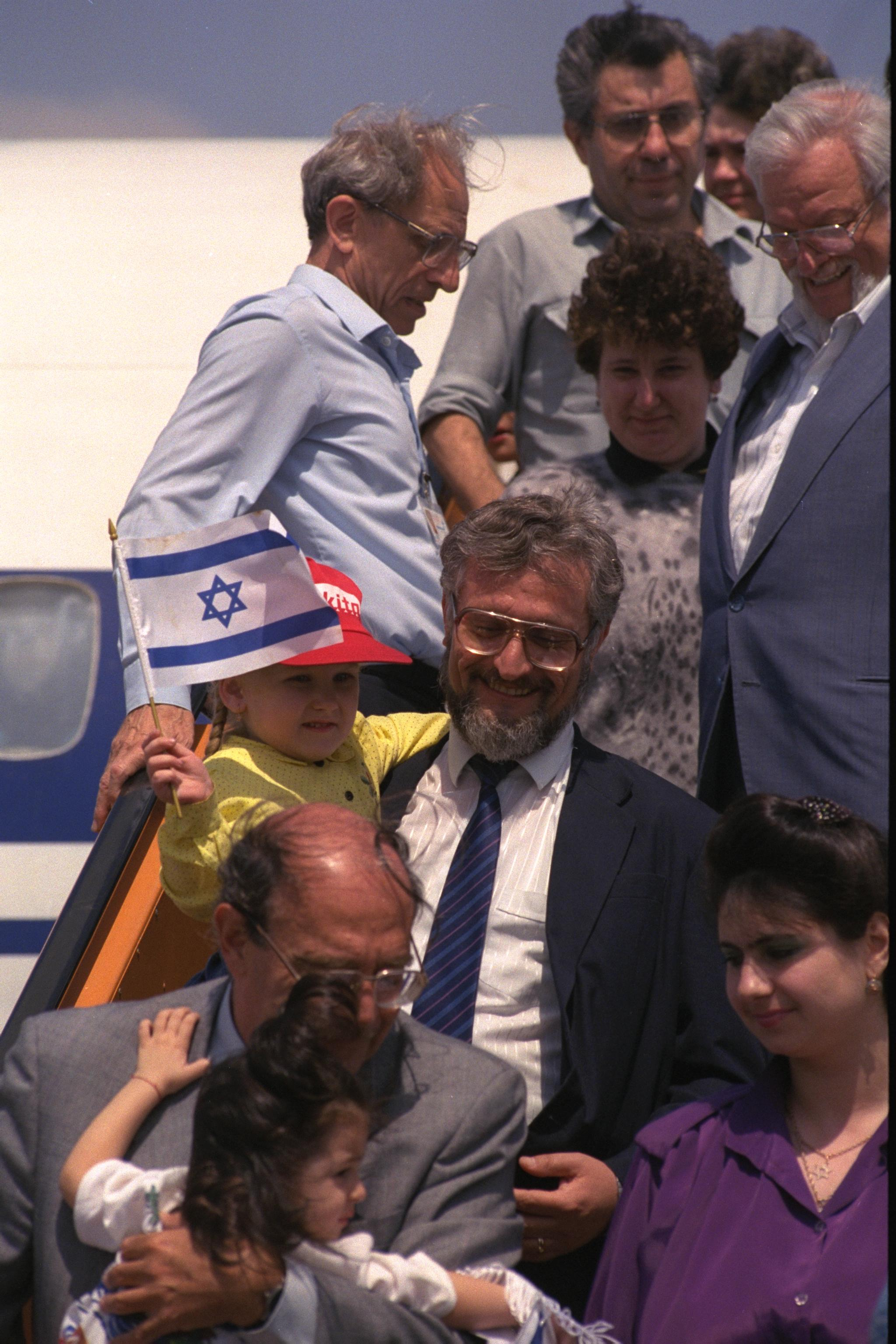
Birobidzhaners arriving in Israel, 23 March 1993

In 1991, after the breakup of the Soviet Union, the Jewish Autonomous Oblast became a federal subject of Russia and thus was no longer subordinated to Khabarovsk Krai. However, by that time, most of the Jews had emigrated from the Soviet Union and the remaining Jews constituted fewer than 2% of the local population. In early 1996, 872 people, or 20% of the Jewish population at that time, emigrated to Tel Aviv via chartered flights. As of 2002, 2,357 Jews were living in the JAO. A 2004 article stated that the number of Jews in the region "was now growing". As of 2005, Amurzet had a small active Jewish community. An April 2007 article in The Jerusalem Post claimed that the Jewish population had grown to about 4,000. The article cited Mordechai Scheiner, the Chief Rabbi of the JAO from 2002 to 2011, who said that, at the time the article was published, Jewish culture was enjoying a religious and cultural resurgence. By 2010, according to data provided by the Russian Census Bureau, there were only approximately 1,600 people of Jewish descent remaining in the JAO (1% of the total population), while ethnic Russians made up 93% of the JAO population.

According to an article published in 2000, Birobidzhan has several state-run schools that teach Yiddish, a Yiddish school for religious instruction and a kindergarten. The five- to seven-year-olds spend two lessons a week learning to speak Yiddish, as well as being taught Jewish songs, dance, and traditions. A 2006 article in The Washington Times stated that Yiddish is taught in the schools, a Yiddish radio station is in operation, and the Birobidzhaner Shtern newspaper includes a section in Yiddish.

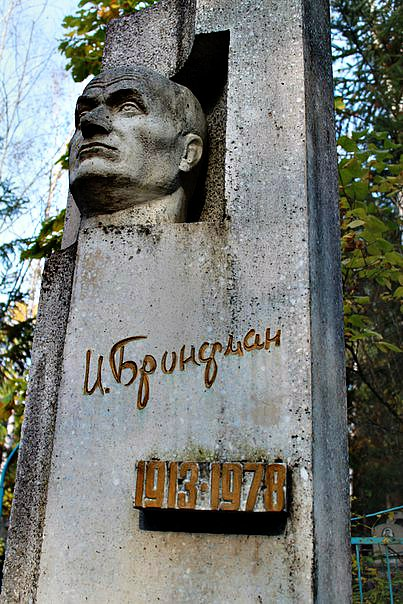
Memorial for Jewish poet Isaac Leibovich Bronfman

In 2002, L'Chayim, Comrade Stalin!, a documentary on Stalin's creation of the Jewish Autonomous Region and its settlement, was released by The Cinema Guild. In addition to being a history of the creation of the Jewish Autonomous Oblast, the film features scenes of contemporary Birobidzhan and interviews with Jewish residents.

According to an article published in 2010, Yiddish is the language of instruction in only one of Birobidzhan's 14 public schools. Two schools, representing a quarter of the city's students, offer compulsory Yiddish classes for children aged 6 to 10.

As of 2012, the Birobidzhaner Shtern continues to publish 2 or 3 pages per week in Yiddish and one local elementary school still teaches Yiddish.

According to a 2012 article, "only a very small minority, mostly seniors, speak Yiddish", a new Chabad-sponsored synagogue opened at the 14a Sholom-Aleichem Street, and the Sholem Aleichem Amur State University offers a Yiddish course.

In 2013, there were proposals to merge the JAO with Khabarovsk Krai or with Amur Oblast. The proposals led to protests, and were rejected by residents, as well as the Jewish community of Russia. There were also questions as to whether a merger would be allowed pursuant to the Constitution of Russia and whether a merger would require a national referendum.

According to a 2015 article, kosher meat arrives by train from Moscow every few weeks, a Sunday school functions, and there is also a minyan on Friday night and Shabbat.

A November 2017 article in The Guardian, titled "Revival of a Soviet Zion: Birobidzhan celebrates its Jewish heritage", examined the current status of the city and suggested that, even though the Jewish Autonomous Region in Russia's far east is now barely 1% Jewish, officials hope to woo back people who left after Soviet collapse.

== Culture ==
JAO and its history have been portrayed in the documentary film L'Chayim, Comrade Stalin!. Released in 2002, the film tells the story of Joseph Stalin's creation of the Jewish Autonomous Oblast and its partial settlement by thousands of Russian- and Yiddish-speaking Jews. As well as relating the history of the creation of the proposed Jewish homeland, the film features scenes of life in contemporary Birobidzhan and interviews with Jewish residents.

== Geography ==
The northern and western section of the oblast is mountainous, with the Lesser Khingan and the Bureya Range, among others. At 1,421 metres (4,662 ft) Mount Studencheskaya, located in the Bureya Range, is the highest point of the Jewish Autonomous Oblast. The southern and eastern section is part of the Amur valley, with only a few small residual ridges.

=== Climate ===
The territory has a monsoonal/anticyclonic climate, with warm, wet, humid summers due to the influence of the East Asian monsoon, and cold, dry, windy conditions prevailing in the winter months courtesy of the Siberian high-pressure system.

== Government ==
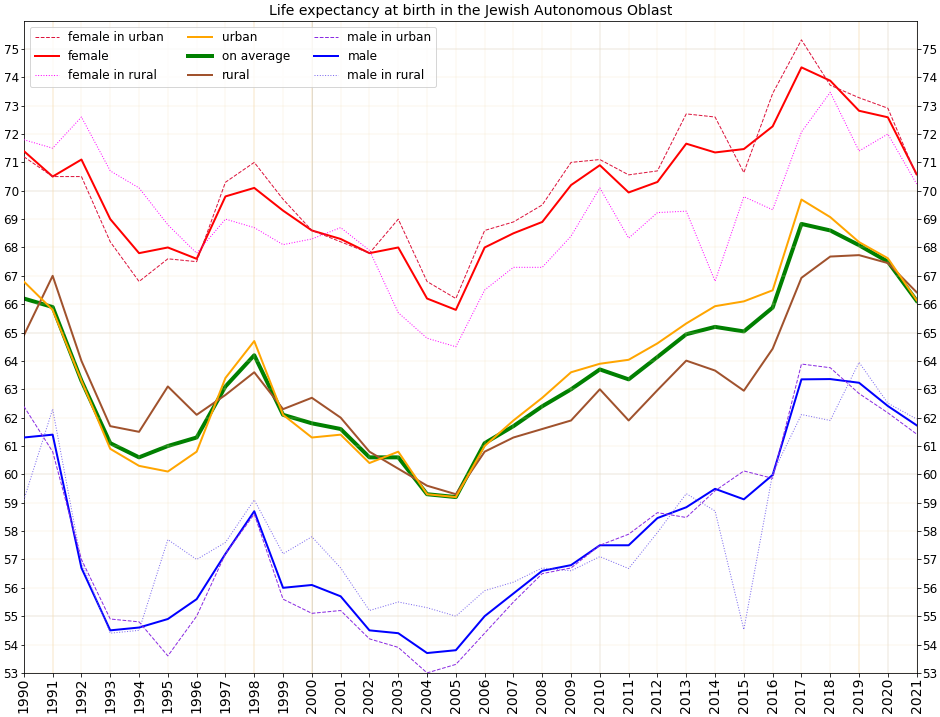
Life expectancy at birth in the JAO

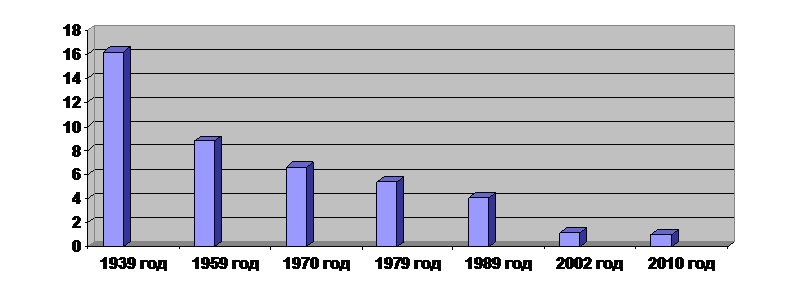
Proportion of Jews in the general population of the JAO by year

Article 65 of the Constitution of Russia provides that the JAO is Russia's only autonomous oblast.

=== Administrative divisions ===
The Jewish Autonomous Oblast is divided into five districts, including Birobidzhan, a town which has district status; the oblast has one other town (Obluchye) and a further 11 urban-type settlements.

== Economy ==
The Jewish Autonomous Oblast is part of the Far Eastern Economic Region. Although landlocked, it is a free economic zone. Nonferrous metallurgy, engineering, metalworking, and the building material, forest, woodworking, light industrial, and food industries are the most highly developed industrial sectors.

Agriculture is the Jewish Autonomous Oblast's main economic sector owing to fertile soils and a moist climate.

The largest companies in the region include Kimkano–Sutarsky Mining and Processing Plant (with revenues of $116.55 million in 2017), Teploozersky Cement Plant ($29.14 million) and Brider Trading House ($24 million).

=== Transportation ===
The region's transportation network consists of 530 km (330 mi) of railways, including the Tsarist-era Trans-Siberian Railway; 600 km (370 mi) of waterways along the Amur and Tunguska rivers; and 1,900 km (1,200 mi) of roads, including 1,600 km (1,000 mi) of paved roads. The most important road is the Khabarovsk-Birobidzhan-Obluchye-Amur Region highway with ferry service across the Amur. The Birobidzhan Yuzhniy Airfield, in the center of the region, connects Birobidzhan with Khabarovsk and outlying district centers.

==== Tongjiang-Nizhneleninskoye railway bridge ====
The Tongjiang-Nizhneleninskoye railway bridge is a 2.215 km (1.38 mi) long, $355 million bridge that links Nizhneleninskoye in the Jewish Autonomous Oblast with Tongjiang in the Heilongjiang Province of China. The bridge opened in 2021 and transports more than 3 million tonnes (3.3 million short tons; 3.0 million long tons) of cargo and 1.5 million passengers per year.

== Demographics ==
Historical population
Year	Pop.	±%
1926	35,540	—
1939	108,900	+206.4%
1959	162,856	+49.5%
1970	172,449	+5.9%
1979	190,219	+10.3%
1989	215,937	+13.5%
2002	190,915	−11.6%
2010	176,558	−7.5%
2021	150,453	−14.8%
Source: Census data

The population of JAO has declined by over 40% since 1989 due to massive exodus in 1989–1996, with the numbers recorded being 215,937 (1989 Soviet census) and 150,453 (2021 census);

=== Ethnic groups ===
Ethnicities in the Jewish Autonomous Oblast in 2021
Ethnicity	Population	Percentage
Russians	133,625	88.8%
Ukrainians	1,292	0.9%
Jews	837	0.6%
Tatars	431	0.3%
Azerbaijanis	411	0.3%
Tajiks	371	0.2%
Other ethnicities	2,712	1.8%
Ethnicity not stated	10,774	7.2%

In the late 1940s, the Jewish population in the region peaked around 46,000–50,000, approximately 25% of its population. The census of 1959 found that the Jewish population of the JAO had declined by approximately 50%, down to 14,269 persons. In 1987, the reformist Soviet government led by Mikhail Gorbachev pardoned many political prisoners and told the American Jewish community that it would allow the emigration of 11,000 Jewish refuseniks. According to the 1989 Soviet Census, there were 8,887 Jews living in the JAO, or 4% of the total JAO population of 214,085. In 1991, after the breakup of the Soviet Union, the Jewish Autonomous Oblast became a federal subject of Russia and thus was no longer subordinated to Khabarovsk Krai. However, by that time, most of the Jews had emigrated from the Soviet Union and the remaining Jews constituted fewer than 2% of the local population. In early 1996, 872 people, or 20% of the Jewish population at that time, emigrated to Israel. As of 2002, 2,357 Jews were living in the JAO. A 2004 article stated that the number of Jews in the region "was now growing". An April 2007 article in The Jerusalem Post claimed that the Jewish population had grown to about 4,000. The article cited Mordechai Scheiner, the Chief Rabbi of the JAO from 2002 to 2011, who said that, at the time the article was published, Jewish culture was enjoying a religious and cultural resurgence. However, the 2021 Russian census indicated (see the table above) a population of only 837 ethnic Jews, or 0.6% of the JAO population were Jewish.

Vital statistics for 2024:

- Births: 1,120 (7.7 per 1,000)
- Deaths: 2,193 (15.1 per 1,000)

Total fertility rate (2024):

- 1.35 children per woman

Life expectancy (2021):

- Total – 66.12 years
- Male – 61.73
- Female – 70.58

=== Languages spoken ===
In the Soviet Union there was an attempt to make Yiddish an official language within Birobidzhan. According to the statute of JAO (1997), Yiddish is one of the recognized minority languages.

Yiddish is taught in three of the region's schools, but the community is almost exclusively Russian-speaking.

According to an article published in 2000, Birobidzhan has several state-run schools that teach Yiddish, a Yiddish school for religious instruction and a kindergarten. The five- to seven-year-olds spend two lessons a week learning to speak Yiddish, as well as being taught Jewish songs, dance, and traditions. A 2006 article in The Washington Times stated that Yiddish is taught in the schools, a Yiddish radio station is in operation, and the Birobidzhaner Shtern newspaper includes a section in Yiddish.

=== Religion ===
Religion in Jewish Autonomous Oblast as of 2012 (Sreda Arena Atlas)
Russian Orthodoxy	23%
Other Orthodox	6%
Other Christians	10%
Islam	1%
Judaism	1%
Spiritual but not religious	35%
Atheism and irreligion	22%
Other and undeclared	3%

According to a 2012 survey, 23% of the population of the Jewish Autonomous Oblast adhere to Russian Orthodoxy, 6% are Orthodox Christians of other church jurisdictions or Orthodox believers who are not members of any church, and 9% are unaffiliated or generic Christians. Judaism, despite being the associated religion of the oblast's titular ethnoreligious group, is practiced by just 1% of the population, which is only slightly higher than the national average and is close to that of communities in other federal subjects. In addition, 35% of the population identify as "spiritual but not religious", and 22% profess atheism, making the Jewish Autonomous Oblast one of the least religious regions in Russia. A total of 5% of the population follows other religions or declined to answer the question.

Archbishop Ephraim (Prosyanka) (2015) is the head of the Russian Orthodox Eparchy (Diocese) of Birobidzhan (established 2002).

== See also ==
- History of the Jews in the Jewish Autonomous Oblast
- Beit T'shuva Synagogue
- East Asian Jews
- In Search of Happiness, 2005 documentary film
- L'Chayim, Comrade Stalin!, 2002 documentary film
- Boris Kaufman
- Pale of Settlement
- Proposals for a Jewish state
