= Judiciary of Russia =

Statutory body with hierarchical structure

The judiciary of Russia interprets and applies the law of Russia. It is defined under the Constitution and law with a hierarchical structure with the Constitutional Court and Supreme Court at the apex. The district courts are the primary criminal trial courts, and the regional courts are the primary appellate courts. The judiciary is governed by the All-Russian Congress of Judges and its Council of Judges, and its management is aided by the Judicial Department of the Supreme Court, the Higher Qualification Board of Judges, and the Ministry of Justice, and the various courts' presidents. And although there are many officers of the court, including jurors, the Prosecutor General remains the most powerful component of the Russian judicial system.

The judiciary faces many problems and a widespread lack of confidence. There have been serious violations of the accepted separation of powers doctrine, systematic attempts to undermine jury trials, problems with access to justice, problems with court infrastructure, financial support, and corruption.

== Courts ==
Russia has a trifurcated court system, with constitutional, ordinary (including military and non-military), and other courts. The Constitutional Court of Russia is considered a separate, independent court. The district courts are the primary criminal trial courts, and the regional courts are the primary appellate courts.

Courts of the Russian Federation
	Constitutional court	Ordinary courts					Arbitration courts		Disciplinary courts
	Constitutional court	Non-military ordinary courts			Military courts		Arbitration courts		Disciplinary courts
Categories of cases	Cases relating to the conformity with the Constitution of Russia of federal and regional laws and regional constitutions (Constitutional Court of Russia).	Criminal cases and cases of administrative offences, administrative cases, civil cases within their jurisdiction			Criminal cases and cases of administrative offences, administrative cases, civil cases within their jurisdiction		Civil cases, administrative cases, cases of administrative offences within their jurisdiction		Appeal decisions of the Higher Qualification Board of Judges of the Russian Federation and qualification boards of judges of federal subjects of Russia relating to the disciplinary offences committed by judges
Federal courts
Court of higher jurisdiction (judicial review)	Constitutional Court of the Russian Federation	Supreme Court of the Russian Federation (the presidium of the court)							
Courts of IV jurisdiction (second cassation review)	—	The Judicial Chamber on Criminal Cases of the Supreme Court of the Russian Federation, the Judicial Chamber on Administrative Cases of the Supreme Court of the Russian Federation, the Judicial Chamber on Civil Cases of the Supreme Court of the Russian Federation (Note: Aside from cassation review, it hears as the court of original jurisdiction the cases which should be heard by Supreme Court of the Russian Federation as the court of original jurisdiction.)			The Military Chamber of the Supreme Court of the Russian Federation (Note: Aside from cassation review, it hears as the court of original jurisdiction the cases relating to the military personnel which should be heard by the Supreme Court of the Russian Federation as the court of original jurisdiction.)		The Judicial Chamber for Commercial Disputes of the Supreme Court of the Russian Federation (Note: Aside from cassation review, it hears as the court of original jurisdiction the cases relating to the economic disputes which should be heard by Supreme Court of the Russian Federation as the court of original jurisdiction.)		—
Courts of III jurisdiction (first cassation review)	—	Cassation ordinary courts			Cassation military courts		Arbitration circuit courts	Court of intellectual rights (Note: It carries out the cassation procedure on the cases relating to the copyrights, patents, trademarks, trade secrets which were heard by arbitration courts of the federal subjects as the court of original jurisdiction. Aside from cassation review, it hears as the court of original jurisdiction some administrative and civil cases relating to the copyrights, patents, trademarks, trade secrets. The cases which were heard by Court of intellectual rights as the court of original jurisdiction could be reviewed in cassation procedure by the presidency of Court of intellectual rights only (appellate procedure is not provided).)	—
Courts of II jurisdiction (appellate review)	—	The judicial chambers on criminal cases of regional courts (supreme courts of republics, krai courts, oblast courts, courts of federal cities, court of autonomous oblast, courts of autonomous okrugs), the judicial chambers on administrative cases of regional courts (supreme courts of republics, krai courts, oblast courts, courts of federal cities, court of autonomous oblast, courts of autonomous okrugs), the judicial chambers on civil cases of regional courts (supreme courts of republics, krai courts, oblast courts, courts of federal cities, court of autonomous oblast, courts of autonomous okrugs) (Note: Aside from appellate review, it hears as the court of original jurisdiction some criminal, administrative and civil cases.)	Appellate ordinary courts (Note: It hears on appeal the cases which were heard by regional courts (supreme courts of republics, krai courts, oblast courts, courts of federal cities, court of autonomous oblast, courts of autonomous okrugs) as the court of original jurisdiction.)	The Appellate Chamber of Supreme Court of the Russian Federation (Note: It hears on appeal the cases which were heard by the Judicial Chamber on Criminal Cases of Supreme Court of the Russian Federation, the Judicial Chamber on Administrative Cases of Supreme Court of the Russian Federation, the Judicial Chamber on Civil Cases of Supreme Court of the Russian Federation as the court of original jurisdiction; the further review of such cases is carrying out by the presidency of Supreme Court of the Russian Federation on cassation.)	Military courts of military districts and military fleets (Note: Aside from appellate review, it hears as the court of original jurisdiction some criminal, administrative and civil cases relating to the military personnel.)	Appellate military courts (Note: It hears on appeal the cases which were heard by military courts of military districts and military fleets (1-st military court of Eastern Military District, 2-nd military court of Eastern Military District, 1-st military court of Western Military District, 2-nd military court of Western Military District, military court of Baltic Fleet, military court of Northern Fleet, military court of Pacific Fleet, military court of Central Military District, military court of Southern Military District) as the court of original jurisdiction.)	Arbitration appellate courts		The Appellate Chamber of Supreme Court of the Russian Federation
Courts of I jurisdiction (first instance/original jurisdiction)	—	District courts (town courts and raion courts)			Garrison military courts		Arbitration courts of subjects of the Russian Federation		The Disciplinary Chamber of Supreme Court of the Russian Federation
Regional courts
	—	Magistrates (Note: It hears some criminal cases and cases of administrative offences, administrative cases, civil cases as the court of original jurisdiction. The appeal review of acts of magistrates is carried out by district courts, and the cassation review – by cassation ordinary courts.)			—		—		—

=== Constitutional Court ===
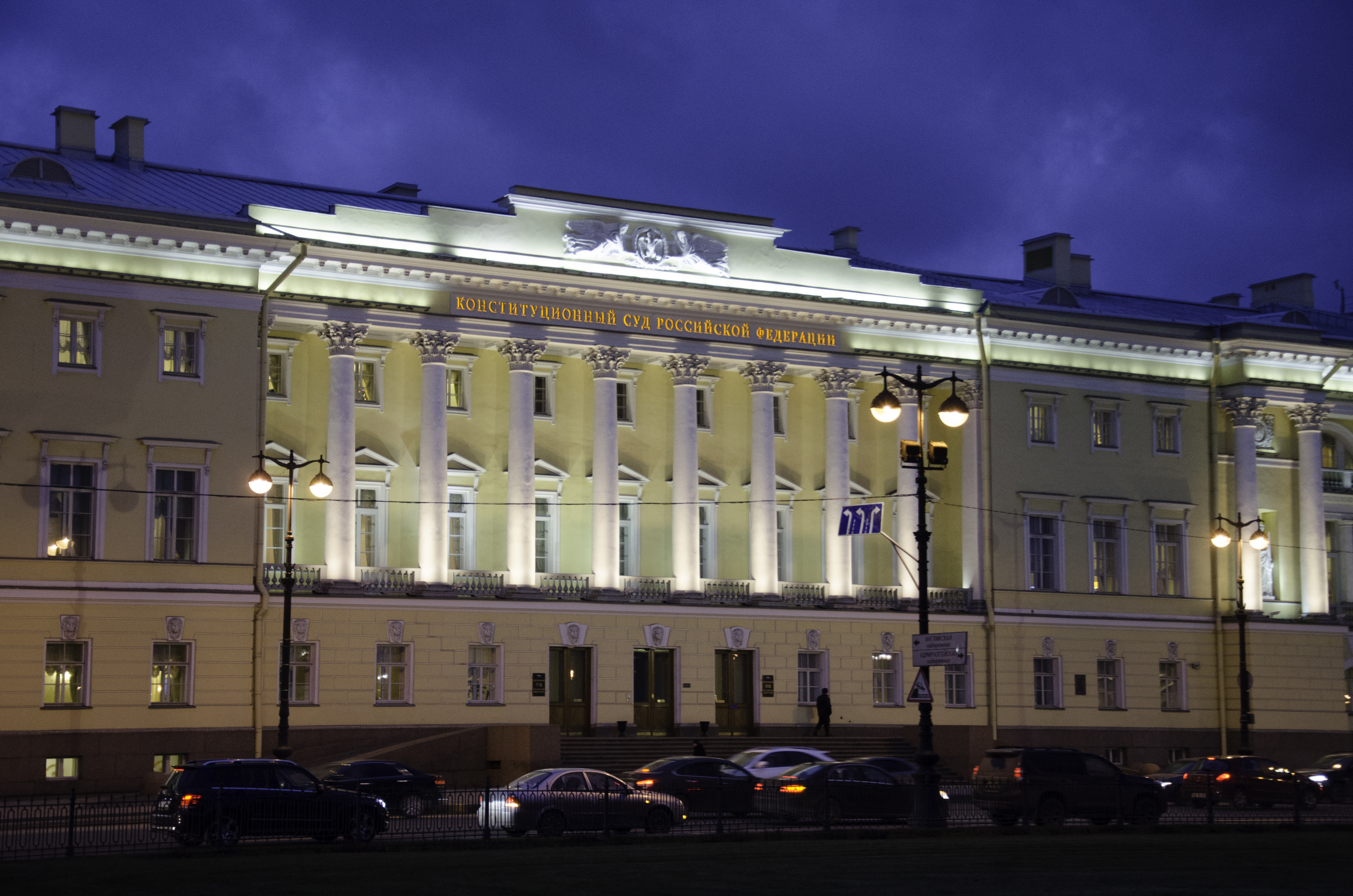
The Constitutional Court of Russia

The Constitutional Court of Russia (Конституционный суд Российской Федерации) is responsible for cases concerning conformity with the Constitution, judicial disputes between 2 or more federal bodies, between a federal body and a member of the Federation, and between members of the Federation. As such, it practices "constitutional review" (as differentiated from judicial review) and decides whether federal laws, presidential decrees and directives, and regional constitutions, charters, and laws comply with the federal constitution, as well as treaties between the national government and a regional governments and between regional governments.

It is composed of 11 judges (with the quorum of 8), and sits in plenary sessions. The President of the Court presides over the sessions. Constitutionality of laws, disputes concerning competence of governmental agencies, impeachment of the President of Russia, and Constitutional Court's proposals of legislation must be dealt with by the plenary session. The Constitutional Court may also submit to the plenary session any other issue at its discretion.

In general, the court hears cases referred by the President, the Federation Council, the State Duma, one-fifth of the members of either chamber of the Federal Assembly, the Government, the Supreme Court, or other bodies of legislative or executive authority. It also hears complains by citizens of allegations of constitutional rights violations.

=== Former constitutional (charter) courts of federal subjects ===
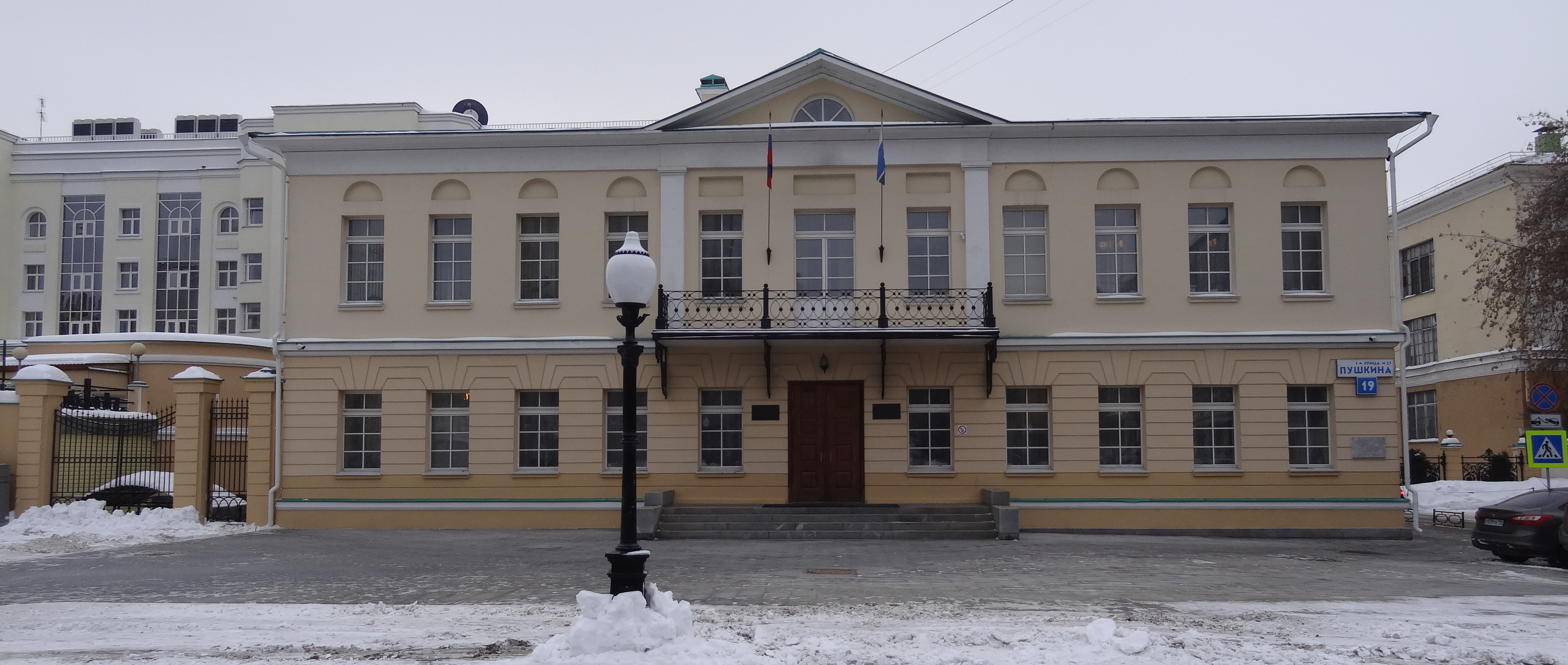
The charter court of the Sverdlovsk Oblast in Yekaterinburg (2019)

Constitutional courts of republics of Russia and charter courts of other Russia's federal subjects used to hear cases relating to conformity with regional constitutions or charters of laws adopted by regional legislatures and governors' decrees, and in this category of cases constitutional and charter courts were courts of single instance. Courts of this type were disestablished by the 2020 Constitutional amendments.

As for 2020, only twelve republics had their own constitutional courts, while two oblasts(Sverdlovsk and Kaliningrad) and one federal city (Saint Petersburg) had charter courts. Two republics (Buryatia and Tuva) and one oblast (Chelyabinsk) had abolished their constitutional/charter courts before 2020. In the republics of Bashkortostan, Tatarstan, and Sakha, the disestablished constitutional courts were transformed into constitutional councils without any judicial powers.

Constitutional and charter courts were completely independent and were not subordinate courts to the Constitutional Court of Russia. They were independent and had their own jurisdiction.

=== Supreme Court ===
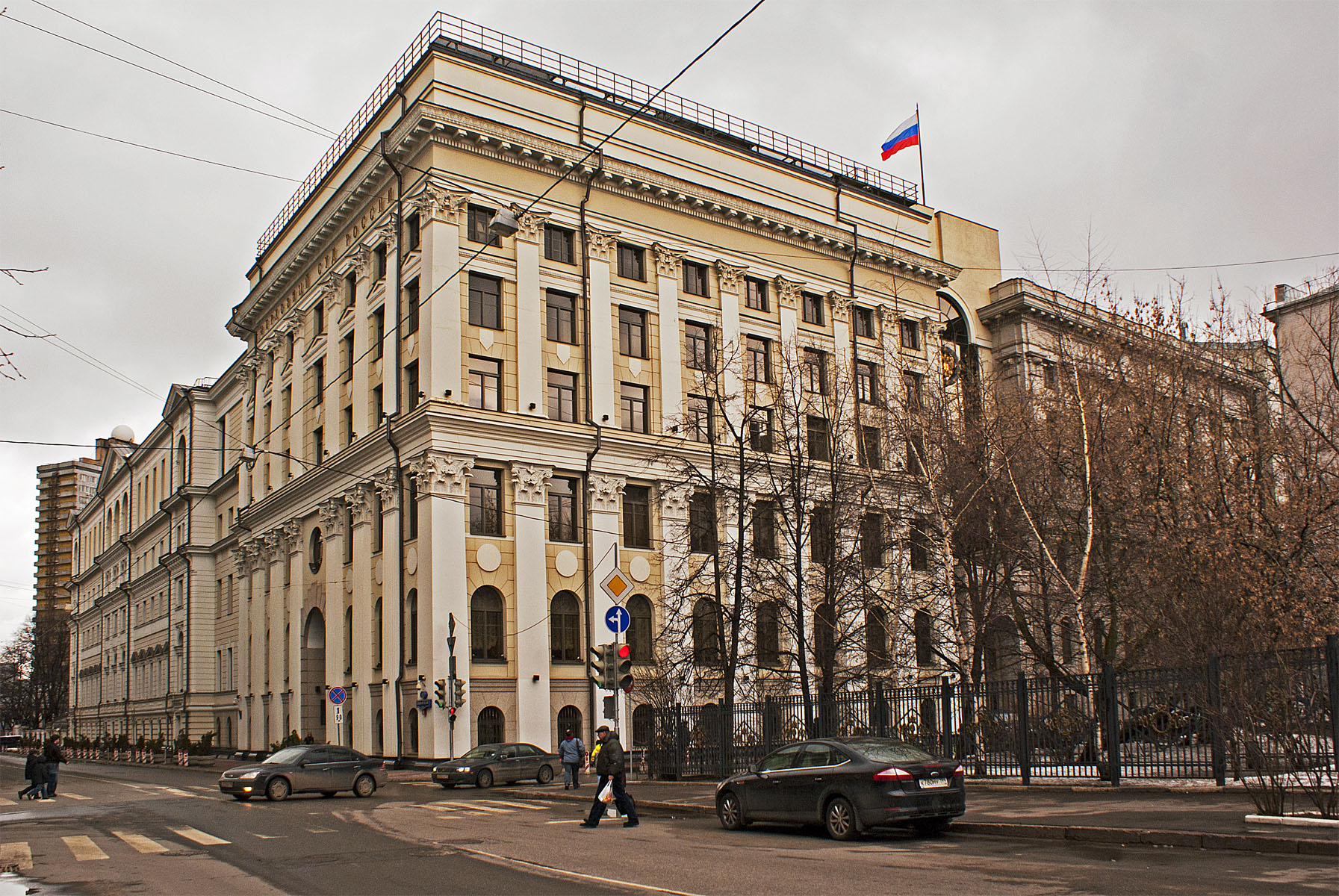
The building of the Supreme Court of the Russian Federation on Povarskaya Street

The Supreme Court of Russia (Верховный суд Российской Федерации) is the highest court, and supervises inferior courts of general jurisdiction. It occasionally sits as a court of first instance in cases where important interests of state are at issue; in this case it normally consists of a judge and a jury, but occasionally consists of three judges.

There are 115 members of the Supreme Court. At plenary sessions the Supreme Court studies the judicial decisions of lower courts on various topics and adopts resolutions, which establish recommendations on the interpretation of particular provisions of law for lower courts for uniform application.

The Presidium of the Supreme Court (Президиум Верховного Суда Российской Федерации) represents Russia's final court of appeal. The Presidium consists of thirteen judges: the Chief Justice, its first deputy, its six deputies and five other Supreme Court judges. Only the Prosecutor General has the right to appeal to the Presidium, and as a result, very few criminal cases reviewed by the three-judge panels of the Supreme Court make it to the Presidium. Only 0.4% of criminal cases in 1998 ended with an acquittal in the Presidium.

The court is divided into several chambers or collegia (коллегия), and each chamber normally sits with three judges:

- civil (коллегия по гражданским делам);
- criminal (коллегия по уголовным делам);
- administrative (коллегия по административным делам);
- for commercial disputes (коллегия по экономическим спорам);
- military (Военная коллегия); and
- appeals (Апелляционная коллегия; formerly the cassation panel or Кассационная коллегия), which can review decisions of the other chambers (if only other chambers acted as first instance courts).

There are several entities attached to the Supreme Court. The Academic Consultative Council (Научно-консультативный совет при Верховном Суде Российской Федерации) assists the court in various legal and academic matters and comprises members of the Supreme Court itself, academics, practicing lawyers, and law enforcement officers. The members of the Academic Consultative Council are elected at plenary sessions of the Supreme Court. The Judicial Department is responsible for administration of the courts.

In fact, after the merger of old Supreme Court and former High Court of Arbitration the new Supreme Court of Russia leads 2 subsystems of Russian judicial system: ordinary courts and arbitration courts.

=== Ordinary courts ===
Ordinary courts hear all criminal cases. Also ordinary courts hear administrative cases, civil cases, cases of administrative offenses with the exception of cases under the jurisdiction of arbitration courts. Ordinary courts are divided into 2 types: military and non-military (the courts of second type are also called "ordinary courts" in a narrow sense).

==== Cassation courts ====
Cassation courts became operational on October 1, 2019. They carry out the cassation review of cases which were heard by district courts or garrison military courts as the courts of first instance.

==== Appellate courts ====
Appellate courts became operational on October 1, 2019. They carry out the appeal review of cases which were heard by regional courts or military courts of military districts/fleets as the courts of first instance.

==== Regional courts and military courts of military districts/fleets ====
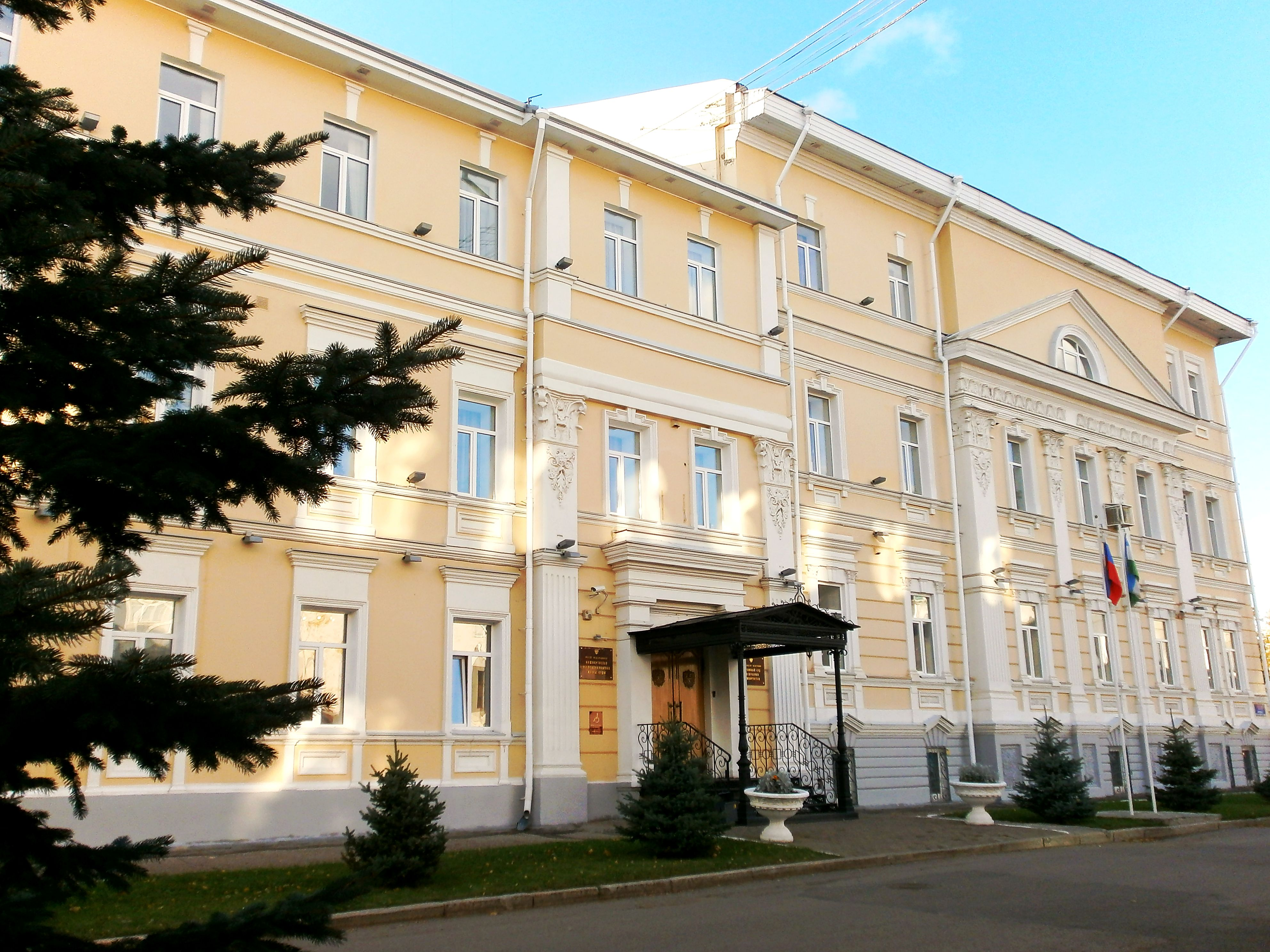
Supreme Court of the Republic of Bashkortostan in Ufa

Regional courts are the courts at the federal subject level, though are not all named as such. This includes the supreme courts of the republics of Russia, courts of the krais (territories; краевой суд or kray courts), courts of the oblasts (regions; областной суд), city courts of the federal cities of Russia (Moscow, Saint Petersburg, and Sevastopol), courts of the autonomous oblasts, and courts of the autonomous okrugs.

The courts sit as both courts of first instance and appellate courts. As courts of first instance, they hear more complex civil cases, serious criminal cases and administrative cases with participation of regional authorities. A judge and a jury, or alternatively 3 judges, hear these cases. As appellate courts, they hear decisions of district courts that have not yet entered into force, and consist of 3 judges.

The jurisdiction of military courts of military districts/fleets is similar to jurisdiction of regional courts, but military courts of military districts/fleets hear and review the cases relating to the military personnel only.

==== District courts and garrison military courts ====
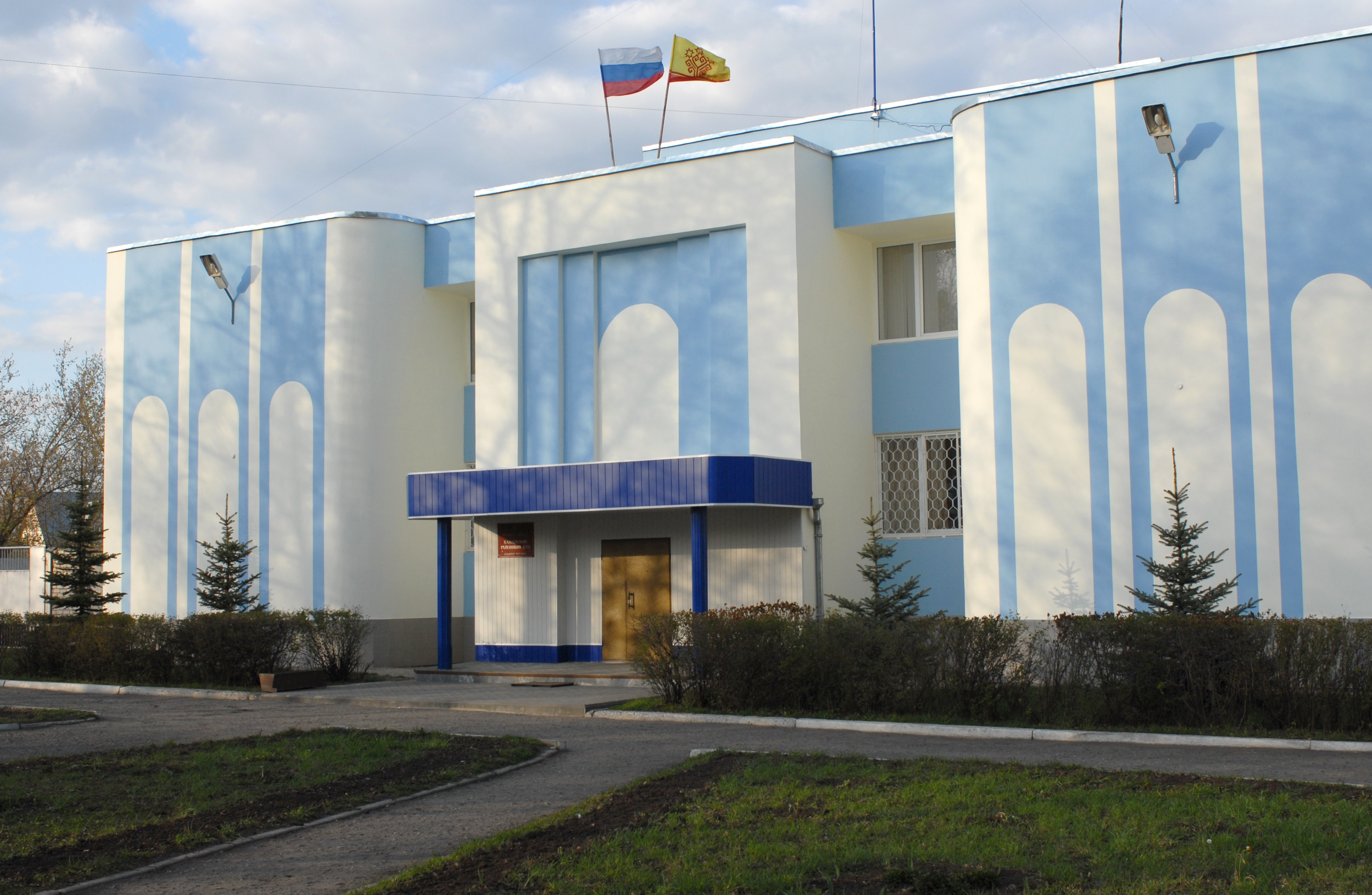
Kanashsky District Court in Chuvashia

District courts (районный суд or городской суд; also called rayon or raion courts), which were called People's Courts until 1996, are primarily courts of first instance but sometimes hear appeals from magistrates. They are formed in areas (районах or rayons), urban areas (районах в городах), and towns (городах). Decisions of the court are appealed to the regional court.

As courts of first instance, they handle criminal cases where imprisonment is for more than 3 years, and consist of 1 judge and a jury where required. As courts of appeal from decisions of the magistrates consisting of 1 justice of the peace, they consist of 1 judge and retry the case.

The jurisdiction of garrison military courts is similar to jurisdiction of district courts, but the garrison military courts hear the cases relating to the military personnel only. Furthermore, unlike district courts, the garrison military courts do not carry out appeal procedure (because magistrates don't have jurisdiction over military personnel).

==== Magistrates ====
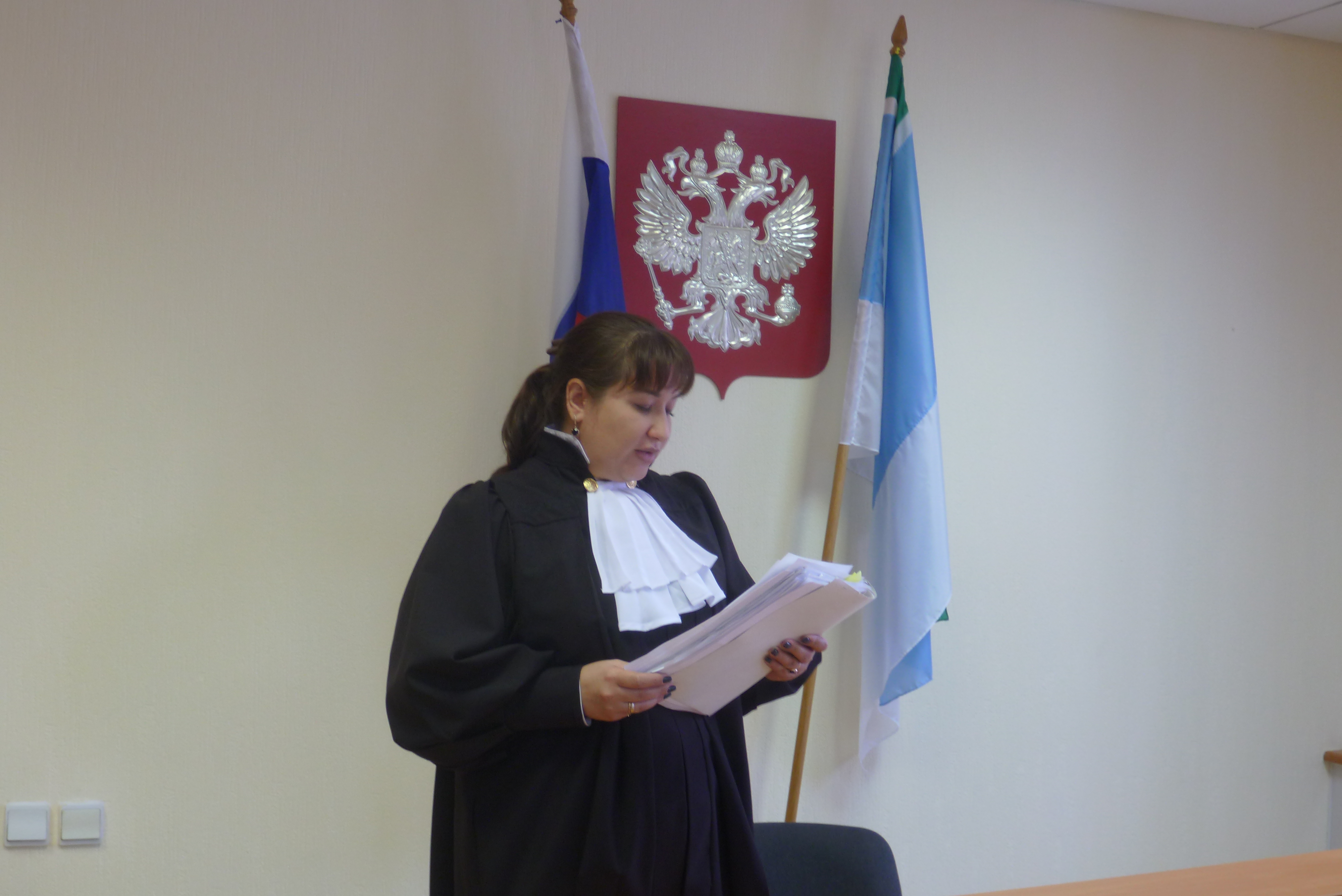
Magistrate Natalya Chekhmakina announces her judgement (Yekaterinburg, 2019)

Magistrates (мировой судья; also called Justices of the Peace) handle criminal cases where imprisonment is for less than three years such as petty hooliganism, public drunkenness, and serious traffic violations of a non-criminal nature, minor civil cases such as simple divorces, some property cases, disputes over land, and some labor cases, as well as some cases of administrative offenses and administrative cases. The magistrates were expected to hear two-thirds of all civil cases and close to 100,000 criminal cases.

=== Arbitration courts ===
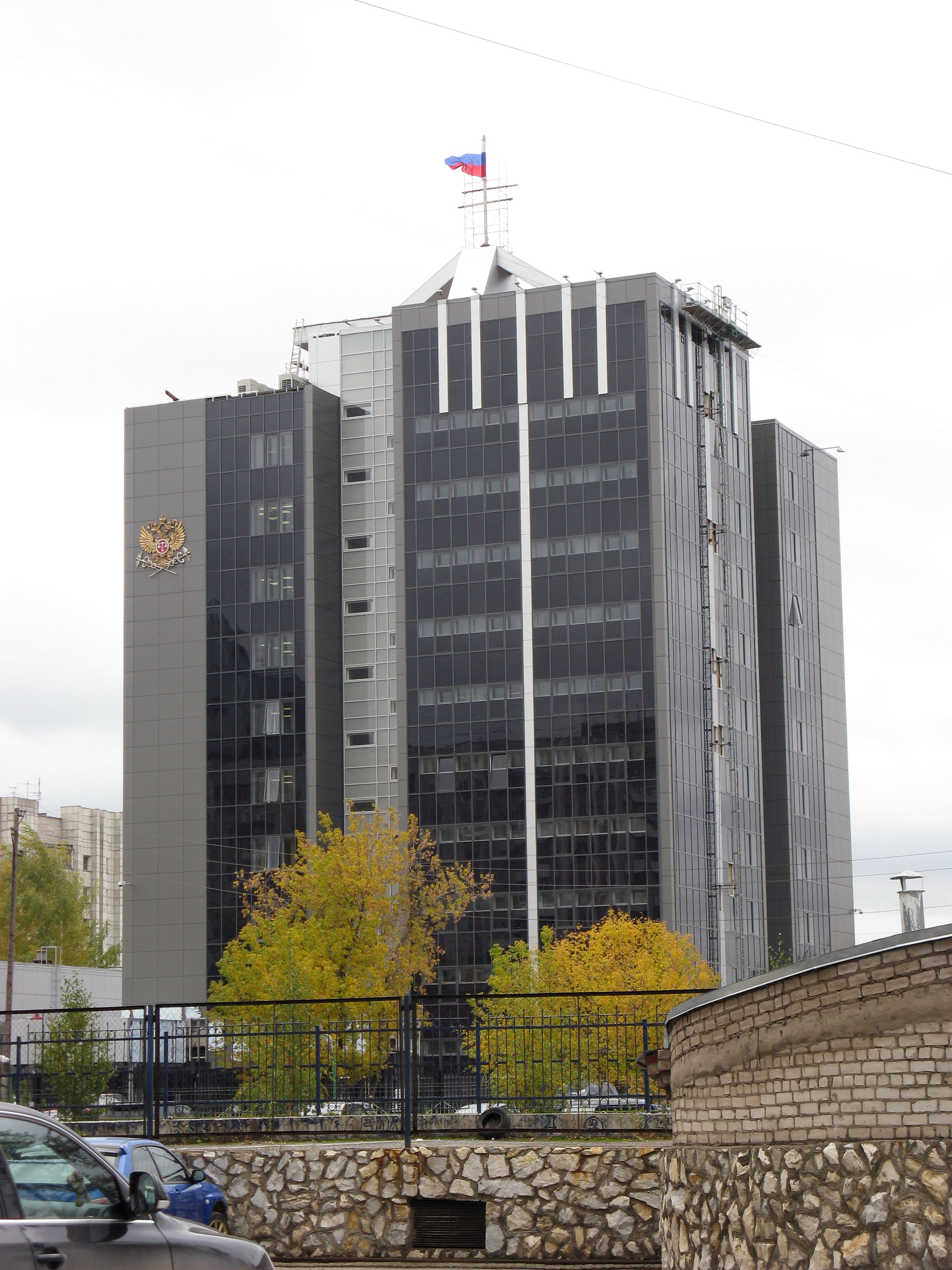
An arbitration court of appeals in Perm

Arbitration courts (арбитражный суд; also called arbitrazh or commercial courts) hear cases dealing with a wide matter of contractual issues, such as rights of ownership, contract changes, performance of obligations, loans, bank accounts, and insolvency (bankruptcy) of juridical persons and natural persons. They operate independently of the other courts. The system of arbitration courts is supervised 30-Judge Judicial Chamber for Commercial Disputes that is part of an expanded Russian Supreme Court effective from August 8, 2014.

==== Arbitration circuit courts and the Court of intellectual rights ====
Arbitration circuit courts carry out the first cassation review of cases which were heard by arbitration courts of the federal subjects as the courts of first instance.

The Court of intellectual rights became operational on July 3, 2013. The Court of intellectual rights carries out the cassation review of cases relating to the copyrights, patents, trademarks, trade secrets which were heard by arbitration courts of the federal subjects as the courts of first instance. Furthermore, the Court of intellectual rights hears some civil and administrative cases relating to the intellectual property issues as the court of first instance; such cases are heard by a panel of 3 judges of the Court of intellectual rights; appellate procedure is not provided for such cases; the first cassation review of such cases is carried out by the presidency of the Court of intellectual rights and the second – by the Judicial Chamber for Commercial Disputes of Supreme Court of Russia.

==== Arbitration appellate courts ====
Arbitration appellate courts carry out the appeal review of cases which were heard by arbitration courts of the federal subjects as the courts of first instance.

==== Arbitration courts of the federal subjects ====
Arbitration courts of the federal subjects hear the vast majority of cases under the jurisdiction of arbitration courts as the courts of first instance.

== Administration ==
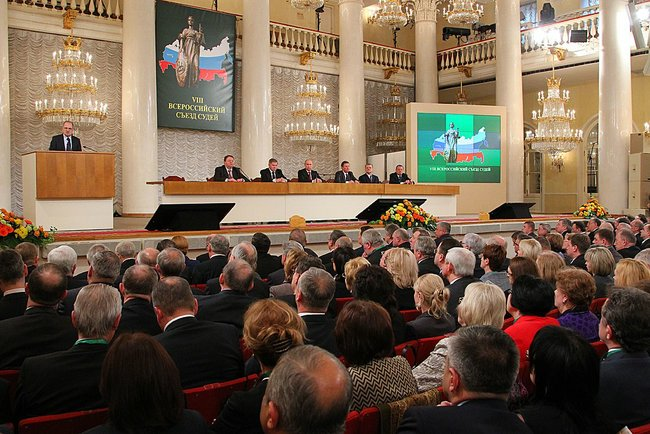
The VIII All-Russian Congress of Judges in December 2012

Pursuant to the 2002 Federal Law on Organs of the Judicial Community, which is the legal basis for the judicial organs of self-government, the All-Russian Congress of Judges is the supreme body of the judiciary. The Congress elects the members of the Council of Judges, the self-government body of the judiciary.

The Judicial Department of the Supreme Court of Russia is responsible for administration of the courts, such as selection and training of judicial candidates, working with law institutes, and qualifications of judges and other court officers. It is expected to enhance the independence of the judicial branch. It also supports the Council of Judges and the Higher Judges' Qualifications Board.

Judicial Qualification Board are bodies of judicial self-regulation that were established at the regional (Judicial Qualification Board) and national (Higher Judges' Qualifications Board) levels. They play a key role in the appointment, promotion and dismissal of judges.

Some judges serve as a court president. The court president is solely responsible for the allocation of cases to judges, has considerable powers in the matters of appointment, and makes the initial recommendation for disciplinary measures, in particular dismissal.

== Officers ==
=== Judges ===
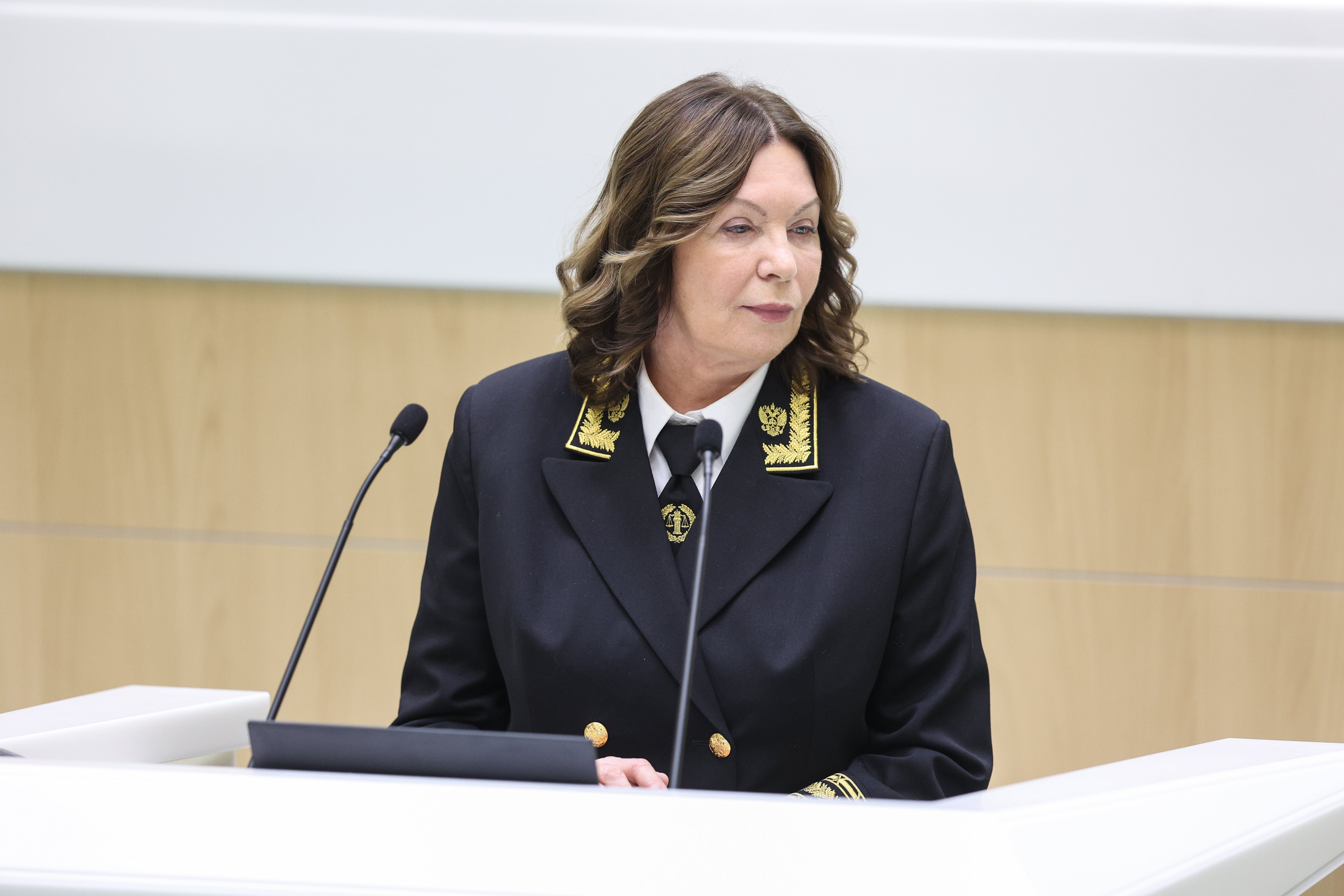
Irina Podnosova, former Chief Justice of the Supreme Court of Russia

Judges are appointed by the President of Russia, except for the judges of the Supreme Court, who are appointed by the Federation Council after being nominated by the President of Russia, and serve for life. Candidates are recommended by the Qualification Board / Higher Judges' Qualifications Board to the President, who in turn recommends candidates to the Federation Council.

The judges of the Constitutional Court are nominated by the President and appointed by the Federation Council for 12 years, and the judges must be at least 40 years old and must retire at 70 years old. The also must have served as a lawyer for at least 15 years and have a "recognized high qualification" (quotation from Constitutional Court Act) in law.

A candidate for the position of the district court judge must be at least 25 years old, be expected to have received a higher legal education (commonly a specialist degree), have at least 5 years of experience in the legal profession, and pass an examination from the Ministry of Justice. A candidate for a position of a judge of garrison military court has to meet the same conditions as for a candidate for a position of a judge of district court. Initially, a candidate for a position of a judge of garrison military court had to have a military rank of commissioned officer, because judges of military courts were military personnel (although not subordinated to any military authority); however, since 30 June 2009, when the amendments, contained in Federal Constitutional Law of 29 June 2009, No.3-FKZ, entered into force, judges of military courts are no longer military personnel and candidates are no longer necessary to have military rank of commissioned officer.

Magistrates are usually appointed by the regional legislature, but may also be elected. They require most of the same qualifications.

=== Prosecutors ===
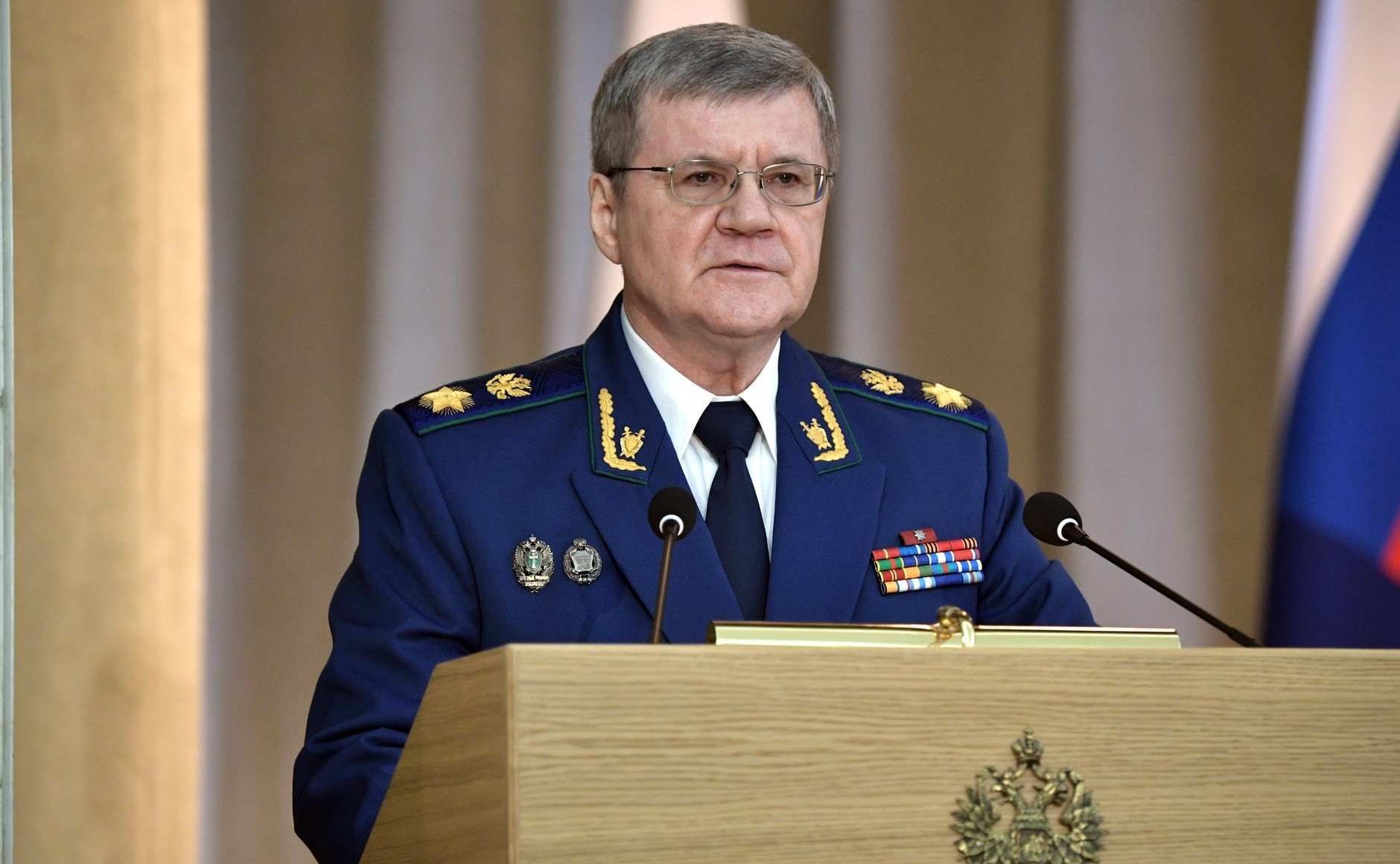
Yury Chaika, the former Prosecutor General of Russia

The Prosecutor General of Russia is the highest prosecutor in Russia, and both he and his office are independent from the executive, legislative and judicial branches of power. The Prosecutor General remains the most powerful component of the Russian judicial system.

The Prosecutor General is entrusted with:

1. prosecution in court on behalf of the State;
2. representation of the interests of a citizen or of the State in court in cases determined by law;
3. supervision of the observance of laws by bodies that conduct detective and search activity, inquiry and pre-trial investigation;
4. supervision of the observance of laws in the execution of judicial decisions in criminal cases, and also in the application of other measures of coercion related to the restraint of personal liberty of citizens.

The Prosecutor General is nominated by the President of Russia and appointed by the majority of Federation Council for a term of five years. If the nomination fails, the President must nominate another candidate within 30 days. The resignation of the Prosecutor General before the end of his term should be approved by both a majority of Federation Council and the President.

The Prosecutor General leads the General Prosecutor's Office of the Russian Federation. The prosecutor's offices of the federal subjects are subordinate to the General Prosecutor's Office of the Russian Federation, and the prosecutor's offices of towns and raions are subordinate to the prosecutor's offices of subjects of the Russian Federation. There are specialized prosecutor's offices (environmental prosecutor's offices, penitentiary prosecutor's offices, transport prosecutor's offices, closed towns prosecutor's offices) which are subordinate to the General Prosecutor's Office of the Russian Federation and have own subordinated prosecutor's offices. Finally, there is the Chief Military Prosecutor's Office of the Russia Federation which is subordinate to the General Prosecutor's Office of the Russian Federation and have own subordinated military prosecutor's offices (military prosecutor's office of Western Military District, military prosecutor's office of Eastern Military District, military prosecutor's office of Southern Military District, military prosecutor's office of Central Military District, military prosecutor's office of Northern Fleet, military prosecutor's office of Baltic Fleet, military prosecutor's office of Black Sea Fleet, military prosecutor's office of Pacific Fleet, military prosecutor's office of Strategic Missile Forces and Moscow city military prosecutor's office) which in turn have own subordinated military prosecutor's offices (garrison military prosecutor's offices).

Prosecutors in a broad sense are directly prosecutors (who leads prosecutor's offices), their deputies, senior assistants and junior assistants. All of them are federal government officials, have special ranks (Russian: классные чины) and wear special uniform with shoulder insignia. Military prosecutors (in a broad sense) are military personnel, have military ranks of commissioned officers and wear military uniform with shoulder insignia but they are not subordinate to any military authority (excepting higher military prosecutor).

=== Investigators/detectives ===
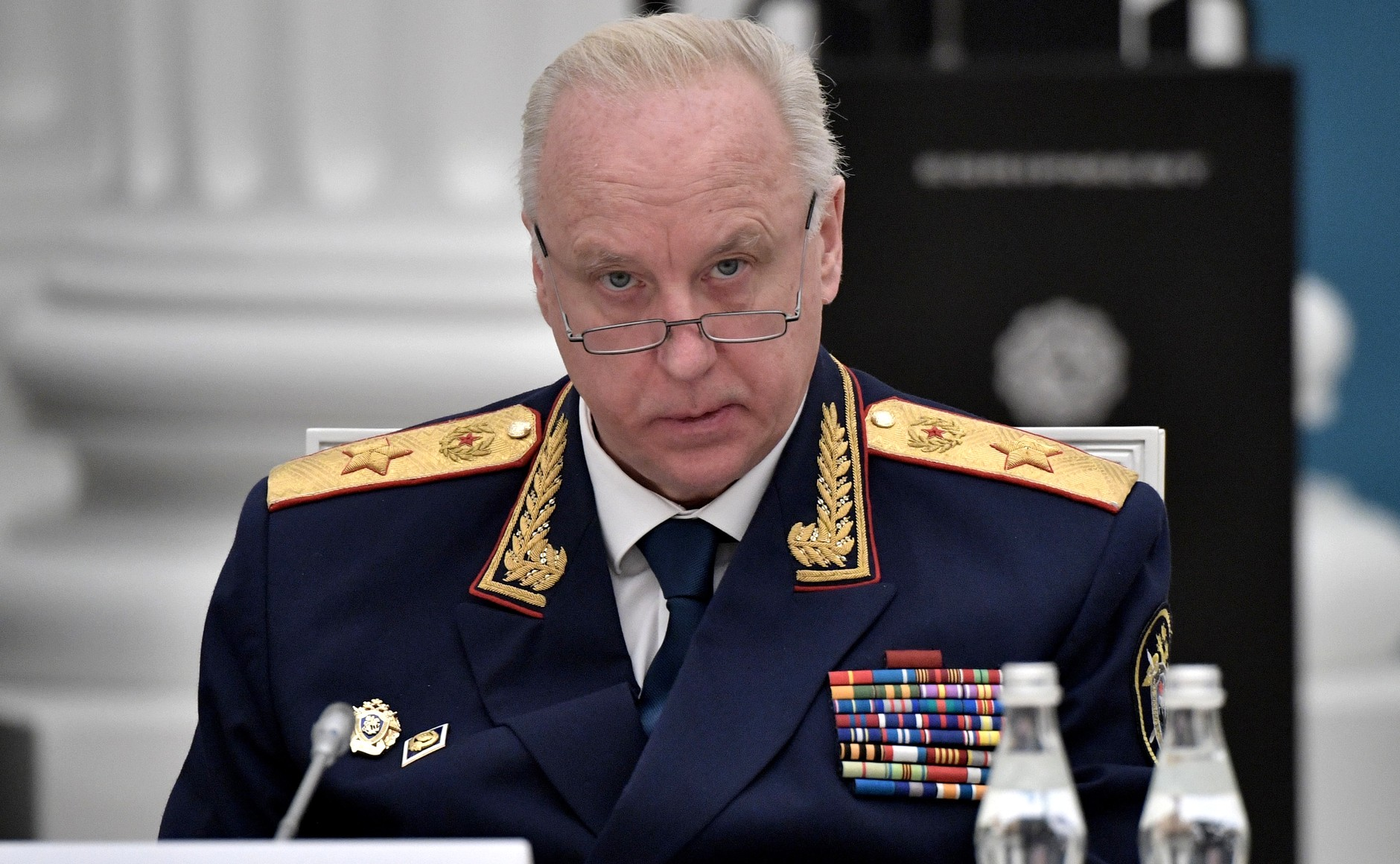
Alexander Bastrykin, head of the Investigative Committee of Russia

Russian Criminal Procedure Code provides 2 forms of criminal investigation (Предварительное расследование): directly investigation (Предварительное следствие) and initial inquiries (Дознание). In this connection, there are two categories of investigators (detectives): directly investigators (Следователь) and persons conducting an initial inquiry (Дознаватель), in Russia. Both of these categories of law-enforcement personnel are not among operational personnel (Оперуполномоченный) which carry out the crime detection activity (Оперативно-разыскная деятельность).

There are 3 law-enforcement authorities where investigators (Следователь) serve, in Russia:

- Investigative Committee
- Federal Security Service
- Ministry of Internal Affairs

The Investigative Committee, sometimes described as the "Russian FBI", is the main federal investigating authority in Russia, formed in place of the Investigative Committee of the Prosecutor General in 2011.

The investigative departments of the federal subjects are subordinate to the Investigative Committee, and the investigative divisions of towns and raions are subordinate to the investigative departments of the federal subjects. There are specialized investigative departments (investigative departments on transport, investigative department of Baikonur Cosmodrome) which are subordinate to the Investigative Committee and have own subordinated investigative divisions. Finally, there is the Chief Military Investigative Department which is subordinate to the Investigative Committee and have own subordinated military investigative departments (military investigative department of the Western Military District, military investigative department of the Eastern Military District, military investigative department of the Southern Military District, military investigative department of the Central Military District, military investigative department of the Northern Fleet, military investigative department of the Baltic Fleet, military investigative department of the Black Sea Fleet, military investigative department of the Pacific Fleet, military investigative department of the Strategic Missile Forces and Moscow city military investigative department) which in turn have own subordinated military investigative divisions (garrison military investigative divisions).

Investigators of the Investigative Committee in a broad sense are directly investigators, senior investigators, heads of investigative divisions and their deputies, heads of investigative departments and their deputies, chairman and vice-chairmen of the Investigative Committee. All of them are federal government officials, have special ranks (Russian: специальные звания) and wear special uniform with shoulder insignia. Military investigators (in a broad sense) are military personnel, have military ranks of commissioned officers and wear military uniform with shoulder insignia but they are not subordinate to any military authority (excepting higher military investigator).

There are 5 law-enforcement authorities where persons conducting an initial inquiry (Дознаватель) serve, in Russia:

- Ministry of Internal Affairs
- Border Service
- Federal Bailiffs Service
- Russian State Fire Service of Ministry of Emergency Situations
- Federal Customs Service

=== Advocates ===
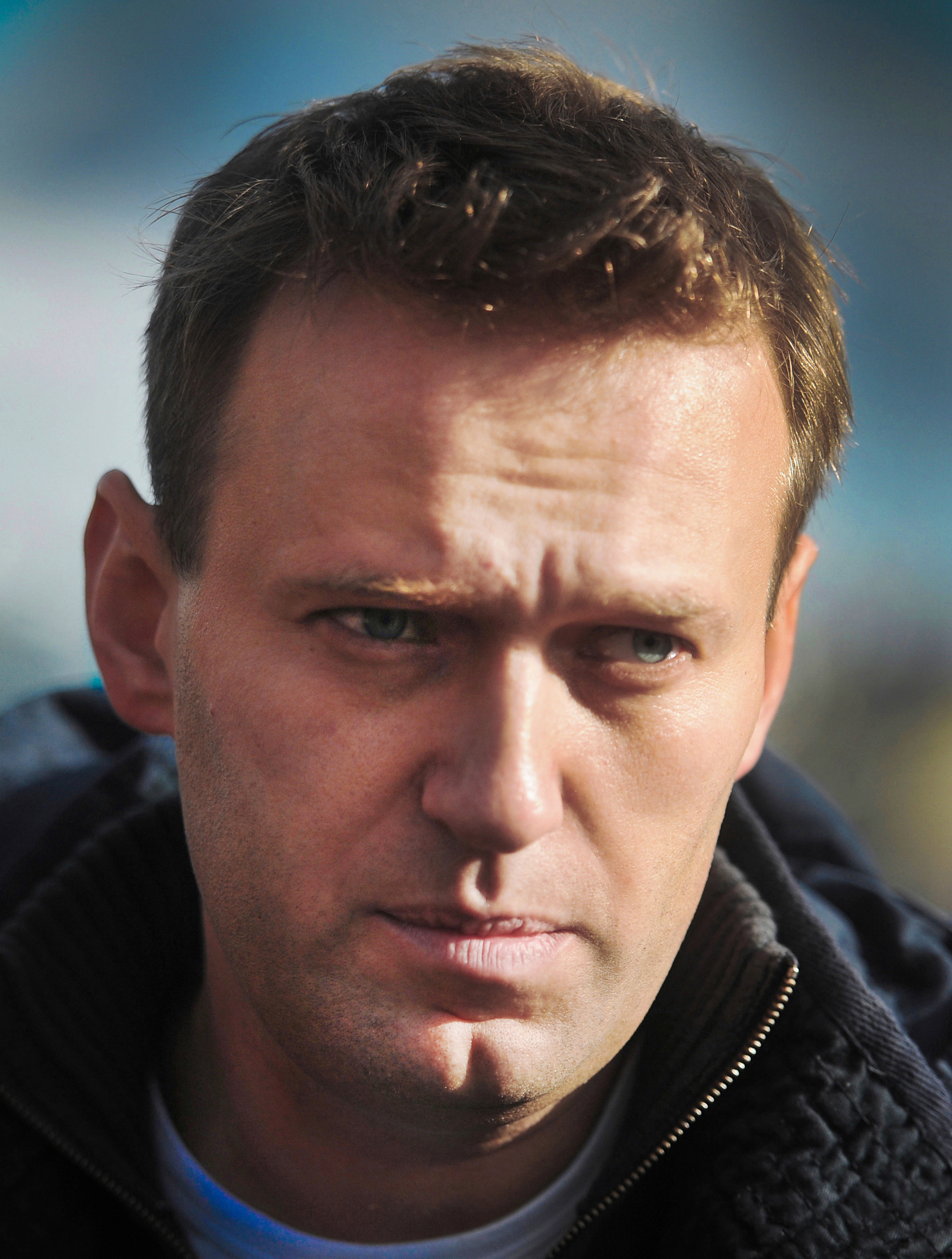
Alexei Navalny, the most famous Russian opposition leader and a former Russian advocate who was deprived advocate's status in November 2013 after the judgement in the Kirovles case had entered into force

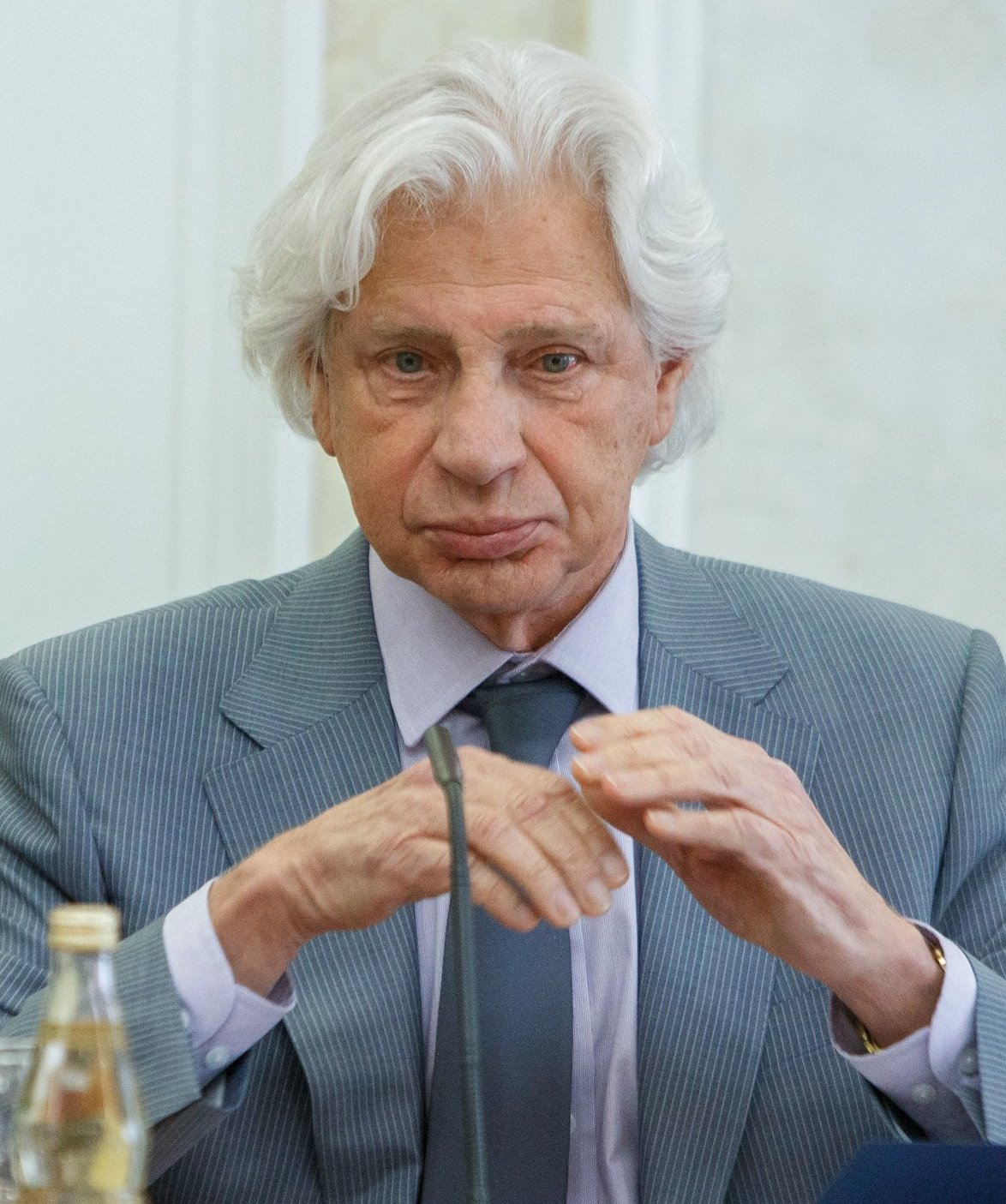
Henri Reznik, ex-president of the Moscow City Advocates' Chamber, who is widely considered as a maitre among advocates

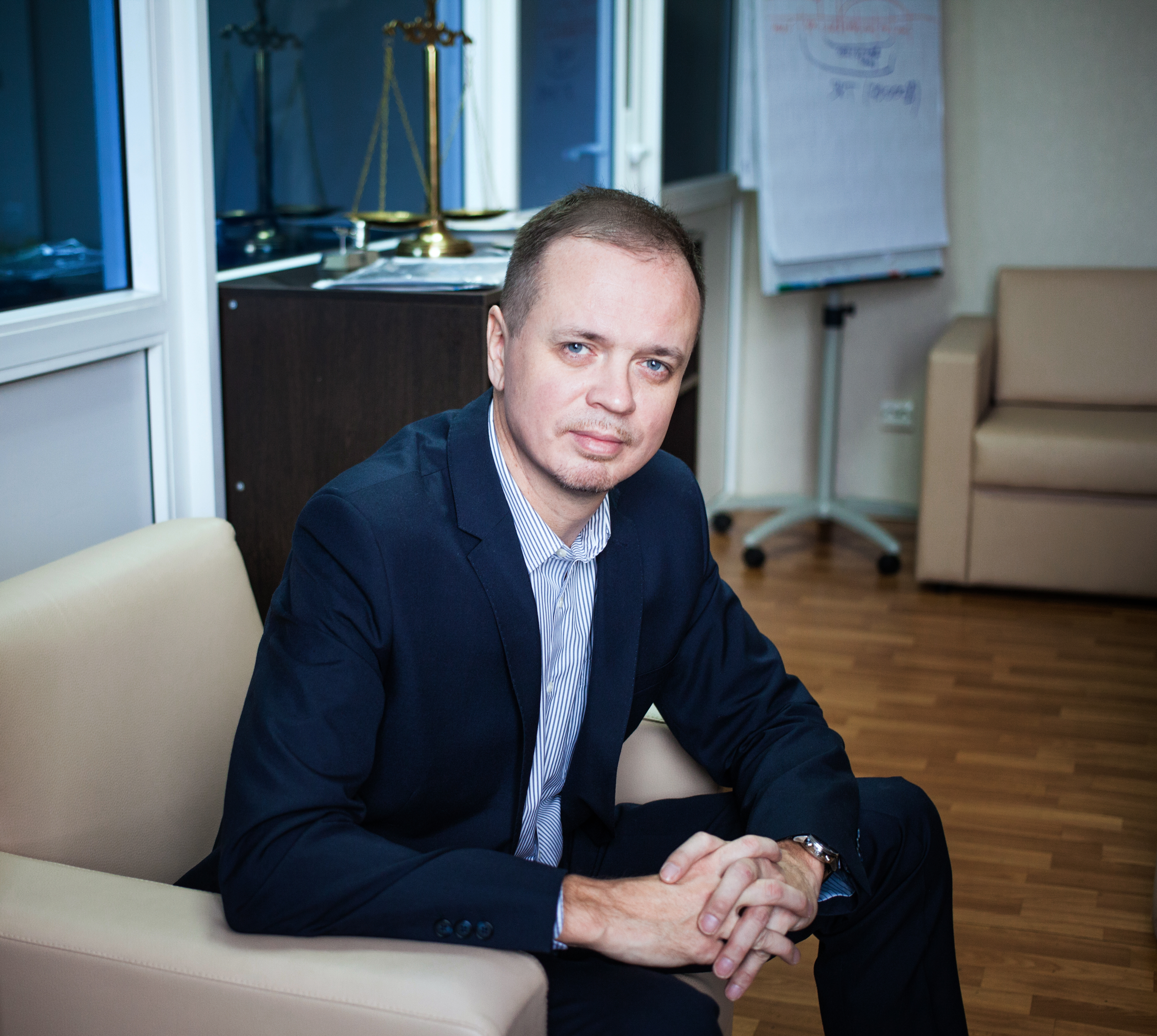
Ivan Pavlov, the leader of Team 29 and a Russian advocate who defended citizens persecuted by Federal Security Service

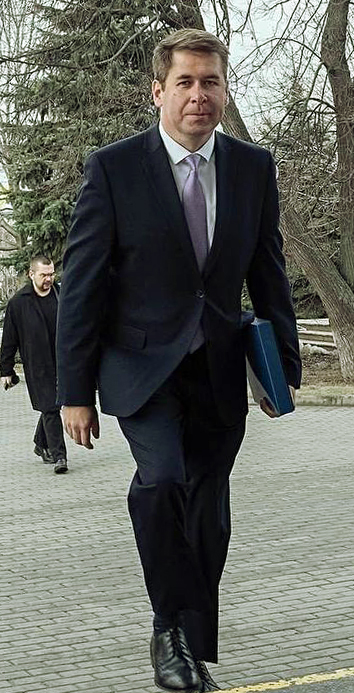
Ilia Novikov, a Russian and Ukrainian advocate who defended famous political prisoners in Russia

In Russia, anyone with a legal education (lawyer) can practice law, but only a member of the Advokatura (Адвокатура) may practice before a criminal court (other person can be a defence counsel in criminal proceeding along with a member of Advokatura but not in lieu him) and Constitutional Court (leaving aside persons having academic degree of candidate or doctor in juridical sciences who also can represent parties in constitutional proceeding). Specialist degree in law is the most commonly awarded academic degree in Russian jurisprudence but after Russia's accession to the Bologna process only bachelor of laws and master of laws academic degrees are available in Russian institutions of higher education. An "advocate" is a lawyer who has demonstrated qualification and belongs to an organizational structure of Advocates specified by law, known as being "called to the bar" in Commonwealth countries.

An examination is administered by the qualifications commission of regional advocate's chamber for admission to its Advokatura. To sit for the exam, one must have a higher legal education and also two years of experience in legal work after graduation or a training program in a law firm after graduation. The exam is both written and oral, but the main test is oral. The written exam takes place in the form of computer testing and includes issues of the professional conduct of advocate and advocate's professional responsibility. After successfully passing of the written exam the candidates are allowed to take the oral exam. As part of the oral exam, the candidate must demonstrate his knowledge in various bodies of law and solve some mimic a real-life legal tasks. The candidate who does not pass the qualification exam can try to pass it again after 1 year only. The qualifications commission is composed of seven Advocates, two judges, two representatives of the regional legislature, and two representatives of the Ministry of Justice.

After successful passing the qualification exam a candidate should take the oath of advocate. From the moment of taking the oath, he becomes an advocate and a member of the advocates' chamber of the relevant federal subject of Russia. Advocates' chamber sends relevant information to the territorial subdivision of the Ministry of Justice of the Russian Federation, which includes the new advocate in the register of Advocates of the relevant federal subject of Russia and issues to him an advocate's certificate, which is the only official document confirming the status of an advocate, on the basis of this information. The status of an advocate is granted for an indefinite period and is not limited by any age. There is only 1 advocates' chamber in each federal subject of Russia. Each advocate can be the member of only 1 advocates' chamber and can be listed in the register of Advocates of the relevant federal subject of Russia only. In case of relocation to another region, the advocate ceases to be a member of the advocates' chamber and should be excluded from register of Advocates at the old place of residence (advocate's certificate should be returned to the subdivision of the Ministry of Justice of the Russian Federation, which issued it), and after that he becomes a member of the advocates' chamber and is included in the register of Advocates at the new place of residence (where he receive new advocate's certificate) without any exams. Each advocate can carry out his professional activity throughout Russia, regardless of membership in particular regional advocates' chamber and regardless of particular regional register where he is listed in. Advocates carry out their professional activity individually (advocate's office) or as the member of advocate's juridical person (collegium of advocates, advocate's bureau). Advocate can open their own office after at least 3 years legal practice in collegium or bureau. An advocate, who has opened own office, can not be the member of any advocate's juridical person, and an advocate, who is the member of one advocate's juridical person, can not be the member of any other advocate's juridical person. Advocate is obliged to report to advocates' chamber any changes in his membership in a collegium or a bureau and, equally, opening and closing an office.

An advocate can not be an individual entrepreneur, government official, municipal official, notary, judge, elected official. An advocate can not work under an employment (labour) contract, with the exception of scientific and teaching activities. An advocate may combine his status with the status of a patent attorney, a trustee in bankruptcy. An advocate may be a shareholder/owner of business juridical persons and a member of voluntary associations and political parties. Russian advocate may have a status of advocate (attorney, barrister, solicitor) in foreign jurisdiction, subject to above conditions.

Russian law provides for voluntary and involuntary suspension of advocate's status. Voluntary suspension for a term of 1 to 10 years occurs when an Advocate files relevant application to the advocates' chamber. Involuntary suspension is applicable in cases of serious illness, election to an elected position in federal, regional or local authorities, military conscription, declaration of absence made by the court decision. An Advocate can not carry out advocate's activity during suspension, otherwise he may be deprived of the right to be an Advocate. After the end of the suspension, advocate's status should be resumed without any additional conditions. Also Russian law provides for voluntary and involuntary termination of advocate's status. Voluntary termination of the status occurs when an Advocate files relevant application to the advocates' chamber. Involuntary termination of the status is applicable in cases of death, declaration of no having legal capacity or having limited legal capacity made by the court decision, conviction for intentional crime made by the court decision, violations of the federal law regulating advocate's activity or advocate's code of conduct found by advocates' chamber. The latter two cases incur lifetime prohibition on being an Advocate. In other cases, ex-Advocate can go back to being an Advocate on general grounds through a passing the qualification exam, on condition that the reasons for termination of advocate's status have ceased to exist.

Advocates' chambers are professional associations of Advocates, which are based on mandatory membership of Advocates. All regional advocates' chambers are mandatory members of Federal Chamber of Advocates of Russia (Russian: Федеральная палата адвокатов Российской Федерации), which is professional association at the federal level.

As of 2018, there were 49,4 Advocates per 100,000 people in Russia.

In Russia, foreign Advocates can advise on the legislation of their countries; they should register in the special register maintained by the Ministry of Justice of the Russian Federation to obtain the right to carry out this activity. Foreign advocate can in addition become Russian advocate. There are two possible paths for that. The first possibility is to become Russian advocate on the same basis as Russian citizens (i.e. through higher legal education in one of Russian universities, two years of experience in legal work in Russia after graduation or a training program in Russian law firm after graduation, successful passing the qualification exam). Since Russia's WTO Accession the second possibility is available: foreign advocate can just pass special qualification exam to become Russian advocate.

=== Jurors ===
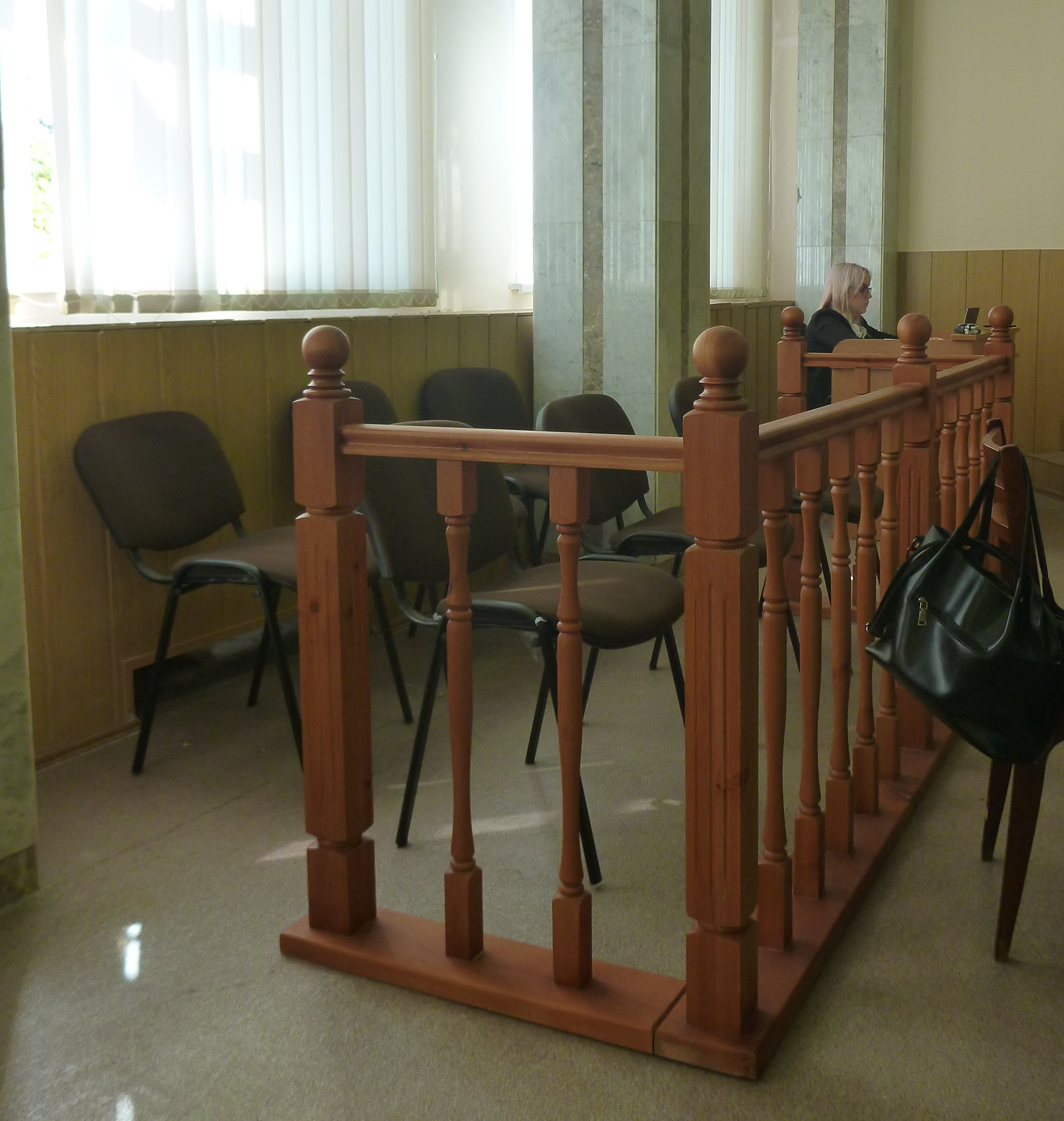
A jury box for 6 jurors in a district court in Yekaterinburg

A juror must be 25 years old, legally competent, and without a criminal record.

The right to a jury trial is provided by Constitution of Russia but for criminal cases only and in the procedure defined by law. Initially, the Criminal Procedure Code, which was adopted in 2001, provided that the right to a jury trial could be realized in criminal cases which should be heard by regional courts and military courts of military districts/fleets as the courts of first instance; the jury was composed of 12 jurors. In 2008, the anti-state criminal cases (treason, espionage, armed rebellion, sabotage, mass riot, creating an illegal paramilitary group, forcible seizure of power, terrorism) were removed from the jurisdiction of the jury trial. From 1 June 2018, defendants can claim a jury trial in criminal cases which are heard by district courts and garrison military courts as the courts of first instance; from that moment on, the jury is composed of 8 (in regional courts and military courts of military districts/fleets) or 6 (in district courts and garrison military courts) jurors.

== Law ==
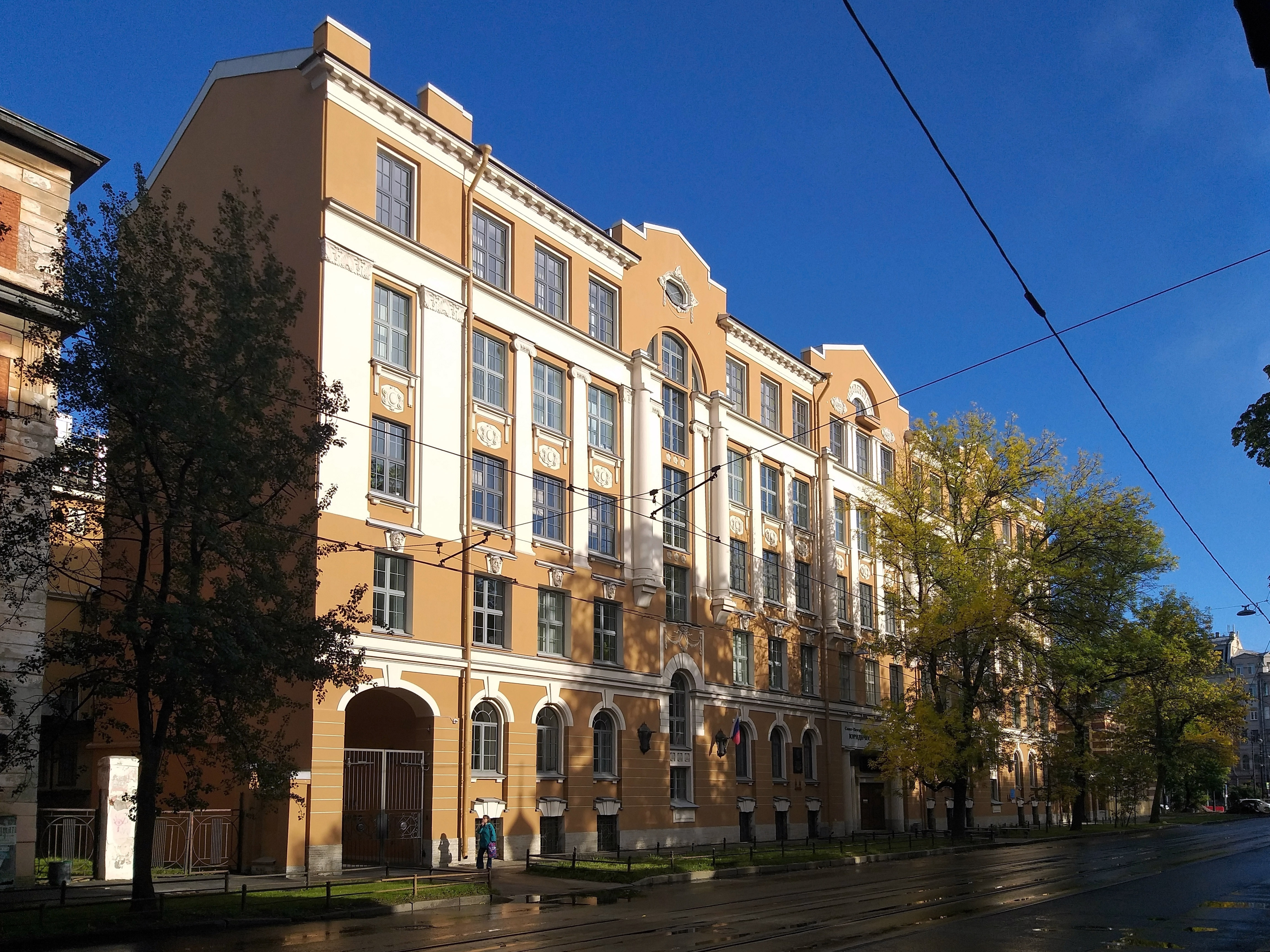
The Faculty of Law building of Saint Petersburg State University

The judiciary is primarily regulated by the Constitution of Russia, the Code of Criminal Procedure, and the 1996 Federal Constitutional Law on the Judicial System of the Russian Federation. The Constitution states that the judicial branch is independent of the legislative and executive branches.

There is no usage of precedent, as used in common law legal systems. As such, the law on appeal may depend on the composition of the chamber deciding the appeal. A chamber normally consists of 3 judges, out of the dozens of judges within the court (19 in the Constitutional Court, 115 in the Supreme Court). Without the legal principle of stare decisis, for each case a chamber may come to a different, even contradictory, conclusion, even compared to chambers within the same session. If they come to relatively consistent decisions, those in civil law legal systems call this jurisprudence constante.

=== Criminal procedure ===
Everyone has the right of legal assistance. The accused have the right to a defense lawyer from the time they are detained, put in custody, charged, or declared a suspect. According to the 2001 Code of Criminal Procedure, defense lawyers can participate in investigations with the consent of the prosecutor, meet privately with a client, collect evidence independently of the prosecutor, identify defense witnesses, present expert witnesses, be present for all court procedures, access to the prosecutions evidence after the investigation, and to file appeals regarding court procedures.

For serious and specific crimes, the accused have the option of a jury trial consisting of 12 jurors. The crimes that may be tried by a jury are murder, kidnapping, rape with aggravating circumstances, child trafficking, gangsterism, large-scale bribery, treason, terrorism, public calls for violent change in the constitutional system or for the seizure of power, and select other crimes against the state. The Constitution of Russia stipulates that, until the abolition of the death penalty, all defendants in a case that may result in a death sentence are entitled to a jury trial.

Jurors are selected by the prosecution and defense from a list of 30-40 eligible candidates. They are similar to common law juries, and unlike lay judges, in that they sit separately from the judges and decide questions of fact alone while the judge determines questions of law. They must return unanimous verdicts during the first 3 hours of deliberation, but may return majority verdicts after that, with 6 jurors being enough to acquit. They may also request that the judge show leniency in sentencing.

== Analysis and criticism ==
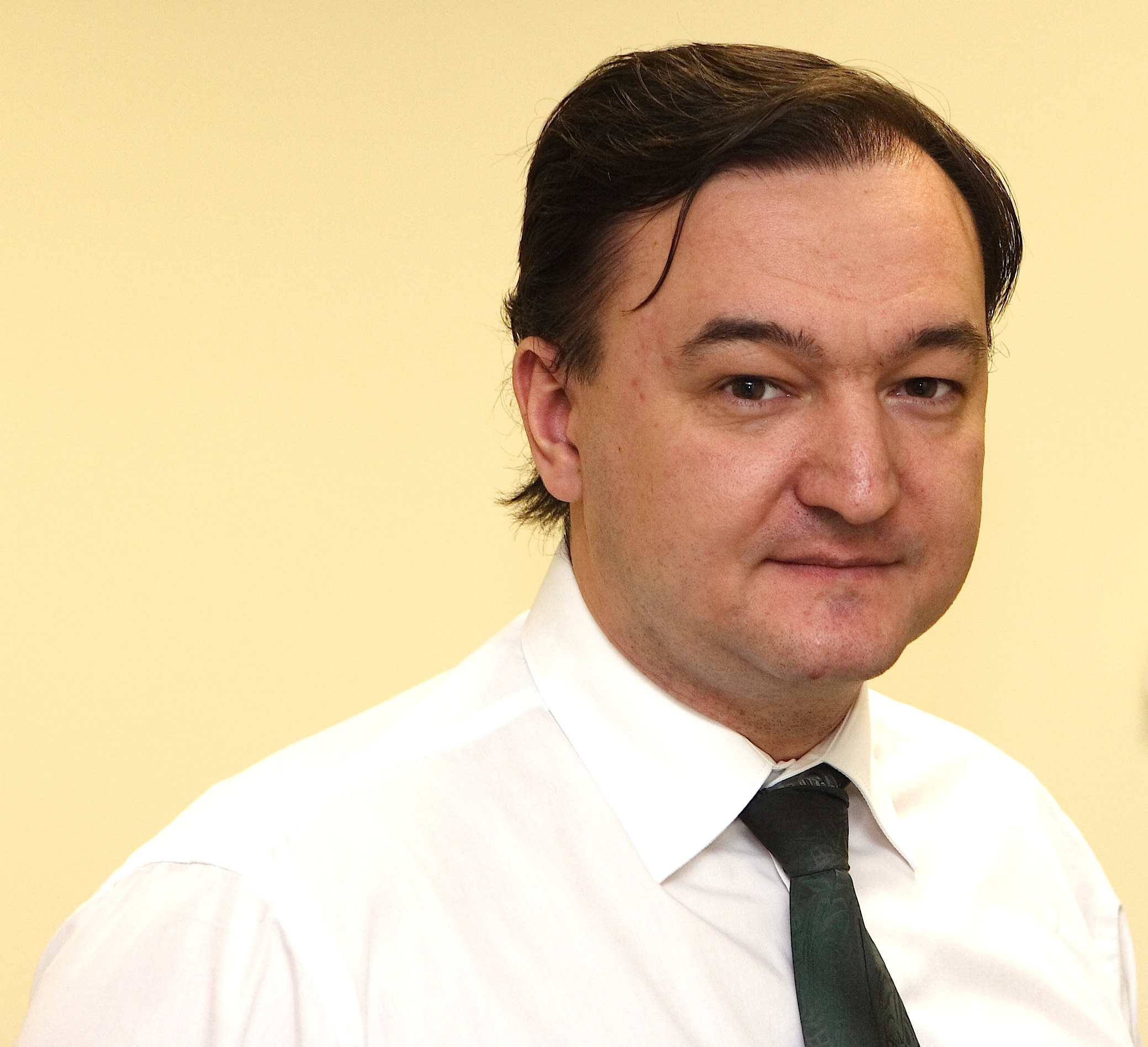
Sergei Magnitsky, a Russian tax advisor and an international cause célèbre

The arbitrazh courts have been singled out as particularly effective in dealing with business issues. Also, the number of people seeking assistance of the judicial system has increased from 1 million under Yeltsin to 6 million under Putin.

However, Transparency International found that 78% of respondents reported they did not expect to find justice in the courts. Both public perception and comments from senior judges point to bribery as prevalent at the trial court level. Carnegie Moscow Center states that judges only give out not-guilty verdicts once every seven years, and that those verdicts will be repealed.

There have been serious violations of the accepted separation of powers doctrine. Constitutional Court Judge and Council of Judges member Vladimir Yaroslavtsev, in a 2009 interview with the Spanish newspaper El País, claimed that the presidential executive office and security services had undermined judicial independence in Russia. Constitutional Court Judge Anatoly Kononov, who had frequently dissented from decisions taken by the majority of the court, in his interview to Sobesednik supported Yaroslavtsev, claiming that there was no independent judiciary in Russia.

There have been accusations of systematic attempts to undermine jury trials, including juror intimidation and bribery, and systematic trial delays. The number of jury trials remains small, at about 600 per year, out of about 1 million trials. Lawmakers are continuously chipping away at what types of criminal offenses merit a jury trial. Juries have granted acquittals in 15-20% of cases, compared with less than 1% in cases decided by judges. Juries may be dismissed and skeptical juries have been dismissed on the verge of verdicts, and acquittals are frequently overturned by higher courts.

Compared to other industrialized nations, Russia has historically had a small number of lawyers in relation to its population. In 2002 there were 47,000 defense lawyers in all of Russia, while the courts sentenced about 1 million people for criminal offenses and considered 3 million administrative offenses and 2.5 million civil cases, and the Russian Census of 2002 put the resident population at more than 145 million people. For a comparison to the United States, the number of active lawyers practicing before the judiciary of California as of December 2012 was more than 179,000, while the 2010 United States census put the California population at more than 37 million people.

The court president has sole discretion for allocation of court cases, and there is no systematic procedure for allocation based on objective criteria. There have been reports where the president always assigns sensitive cases to particular judges or transfers cases to another judge during an ongoing trial.

There have been allegations of corruption concerning the oral exam required for admission to the Advokatura, known as being "called to the bar" in commonwealth countries.

The crucial question of contemporary Russian judiciary is the specialization of judges and courts. One significant event concerning this topic was the International conference – First Siberian Legal Forum "Specialization of judges and courts: International experience and Russian perspective", held in the city of Tyumen (October 17–18, 2014) and organized by the Tyumen State University and Dmitry Maleshin

== History ==
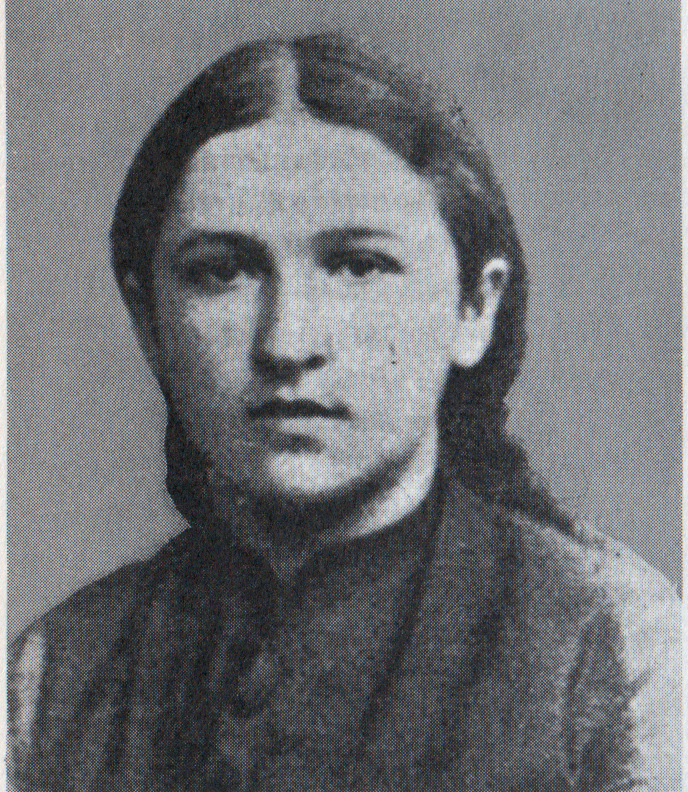
Vera Zasulich, acquitted by jury trial in a well publicized case in 1878

Trial by jury was first introduced in the Russian Empire as a result of the Judicial reform of Alexander II in 1864, and abolished after the October Revolution in 1917. They were reintroduced in the Russian Federation in 1993, and extended to another 69 regions in 2003. Its reintroduction was opposed by the Prosecutor General. Magistrates were first created in 1864, abolished in 1917, and gradually reintroduced from 2001 to 2003.

Lay judges were in use in the Soviet Union. After a 1958 reform they were elected for 2 years at general meetings of colleagues at their place of work or residence, or at higher levels appointed by the soviet. The incidents of lay judges overruling professional judges was rare, and was officially reported in only 1 case by the late 1960s. Unlike the juries of the United States, lay judges were not selected from panels that are cross-sections of the entire population, but selected by institutions in each district.

On 25 May 2001, President Putin proposed the Federal Law "On Amending the Federal Law On the Status of Judges In the Russian Federation", which was passed by the Duma, and signed by President Putin on 15 December 2001. The law introduced disciplinary and administrative responsibility for judges. The Federal Law on Organs of the Judicial Community, which is the legal basis for the judicial organs of self-government, was passed in 2002.

Constitutional Court Judge and Council of Judges member Vladimir Yaroslavtsev, in a 2009 interview with the Spanish newspaper El País, claimed that the presidential executive office and security services had undermined judicial independence in Russia. Constitutional Court Judge Anatoly Kononov, who had frequently dissented from decisions taken by the majority of the court, in his interview to Sobesednik supported Yaroslavtsev, claiming that there was no independent judiciary in Russia. In October the Constitutional Court in an unprecedented motion accused Yaroslavtsev of "undermining the authority of the judiciary" in violation of the judicial code, and Yaroslavtsev eventually resigned from the Council of Judges but remained a judge; Kononov resigned from the Constitutional Court on 1 January 2010, seven years ahead of schedule.

The VIII All-Russian Congress of Judges met from 17–19 December 2012.

== See also ==
- Law enforcement in Russia
