= Sharina =

Sharina is a feminine given name and surname. Notable people with the name include:

- Sharina Gutierrez (born 1990), American model
- Sharina Person, American biostatistician
- Sharina Ravikumar (born 1992), Sri Lankan cricketer
- Sharina van Dort (born 1988), Dutch handball player
- Natalya Sharina (born 1957), Russian librarian
