= Political positions of Grigory Yavlinsky =

Grigory Yavlinsky, a former member of the State Duma, leader of the Yabloko political party, and three-time Russian presidential candidate, has taken positions on many political issues through his public comments, his presidential campaign statements, and his voting record.

Regarding social issues, Yavlinsky has occupied the centre-left. In terms of economic issues, Yavlinksy occupied the centre-right of the Russian political spectrum. His ideology most strongly appealed to Russia's population of young intellectuals. His politics can be classified as liberal-democratic.

== Domestic policy ==
=== Government reform ===
Yavlinsky had opposed Yeltsin's 1993 constitution, as he believed it restructured the government to have a far too authoritarian executive branch. Yavlinsky opposed reductions in civil freedoms, and stood in strong opposition to the establishment of an authoritarian leadership.

Yavlinsky has advocated for undertaking a campaign to remove corruption in government.

He has asserted that the judiciary of Russia should be made genuinely independent.

=== Economic policy ===
During the 1995 legislative and 1996 presidential elections, Yavlinsky promised economic relief for the middle class, which had been neglected during Yeltsin's economic reforms. At this time, Yavlinsky described the sort of individual that he believed might be drawn to Yabloko's platform by saying,

"We appeal, in the first place, to those who have suffered the most from the reforms, however, have not lost the faith and believe that there exists a way out of the current predicament. We appeal to the middle class, primarily to those who receive their wages from the state budget.

they Yavlinsky long had been a figure who supported democratic and free market reforms, but opposed the course of actions which Yeltsin's regime had taken to implement reforms. Yabloko's economic platform sought to focus on a different order of priorities than both Yeltsin's regime and other democratic opposition parties had. Yavlinsky had declared,

As far as economic policy is concerned, the most important task for us is to create a single economical space embracing the entire CIS, to demonopolize the economy, to promote the development of a competitive medium, to make it so that proper ownership relations established in the country (in the sphere of land ownership first of all), to make it so that economic reforms develop from grass roots, not from top down. With regard to the majority of issues our colleagues (other democratic parties) suggest a different order of priorities.

In the 1990s, Yavlinsky advocated the creation of a flat tax. He also advocated for a more transparent, responsible, and efficient budget policy. He also argued that there was a need for policies aimed at supporting small and medium-sized businesses.

Strengthening Russia's economy was one of the main focuses of Yavlinsky's 2018 campaign platform. Yavlinsky stated that one of his main goals would be combating poverty. He wants to give three acres of land for free to each Russian family so that they can build a home there and develop the land.

=== Social policy ===
In regard to social issues, Yavlinsky has occupied the political left.

When campaigning for the presidency in 1996, he aimed to honor government commitments to citizens' social security.

He has supported protections against discrimination for ethnic and religious minorities.

Civil and human rights were key focuses of his 2018 campaign platform.

== Foreign policy ==
By 1995, to further differentiate itself from Democratic Choice of Russia, Yabloko had begun to avoid explicitly presenting itself as a pro-Western party.

Yavlinsky pursued a foreign policy guided by what he framed as "enlightened patriotism".

Yavlinsky did not support the annexation of Crimea in 2014 and believes that another referendum should be held in the disputed region, and that Russia should hold a conference with the United Nations and Ukraine to determine the status of the peninsula after recognizing the 2014 events as a violation of international law. Yavlinsky essentially regards Crimea as part of Ukraine and stated the following: "Any form of forceful intervention in the internal affairs of Ukraine, as well as the incitement and propaganda of war, should be stopped. Commitments to Ukraine's territorial integrity and respect by Russia of its international obligations should be declared at the highest state level." Speaking at a televised debate in September 2016, Yavlinsky said he considers Russian actions in Ukraine to be an "absolute and complete disgrace". In addition, he wants to withdraw all Russian forces from Syria, as well as take measures to normalize relations with the European Union and the United States, as he considers Russia to be politically part of Europe.

Yavlinsky believes that any escalation of tensions with North Korea and the possibility of a nuclear conflict there presents a major threat to Russia, and thus he did not support Donald Trump and his actions in regards to heightening tensions with North Korea in 2017.

== Military policy ==
Yavlinsky was strongly against the military conflict in Chechnya during both the First and Second Chechen Wars. Unlike other major political parties in Russia, Yavlinsky's Yabloko had consistently opposed the Chechen War. This was a position that had often placed the party at odds with prevailing public sentiments.
