= Lazarevo, Jewish Autonomous Oblast =

Lazarevo Лазарево
- Town
- Interactive map of Lazarevo
- Location of Lazarevo Lazarevo (Jewish Autonomous Oblast)
- Coordinates: 48°14′27″N 132°26′37″E
- Country: Russia
- Federal subject: Jewish Autonomous Oblast
- Administrative district: Leninsky District

Population (2010 Census)
  - Total: 751
  - Estimate (2021): 562 (−25.2%)

Municipal status
  - Capital of: Lazarevskoye Rural Settlement
- Time zone: UTC+10 (MSK+7)
- OKTMO ID: 99610455101

Lazarevo (Russian: Лазарево) is a small town in Leninsky District in the Jewish Autonomous Oblast, Russia. It is the head of Lazarevskoye Rural Settlement.

== Geography ==
Lazarevo is located at an elevation of 140 meters (460 ft) by a small mountain range north of the Amur River. The town lies 86 kilometers (53 mi) southwest of Birobidzhan, the administrative center of the autonomous oblast. Its population is 751 (2010 census);

== History ==
Lazarevo is the birthplace of Arctic explorer Georgy Ushakov who fully surveyed and charted Severnaya Zemlya for the first time in history.
