= Ivan Pavlov (lawyer) =

- Иван Павлов
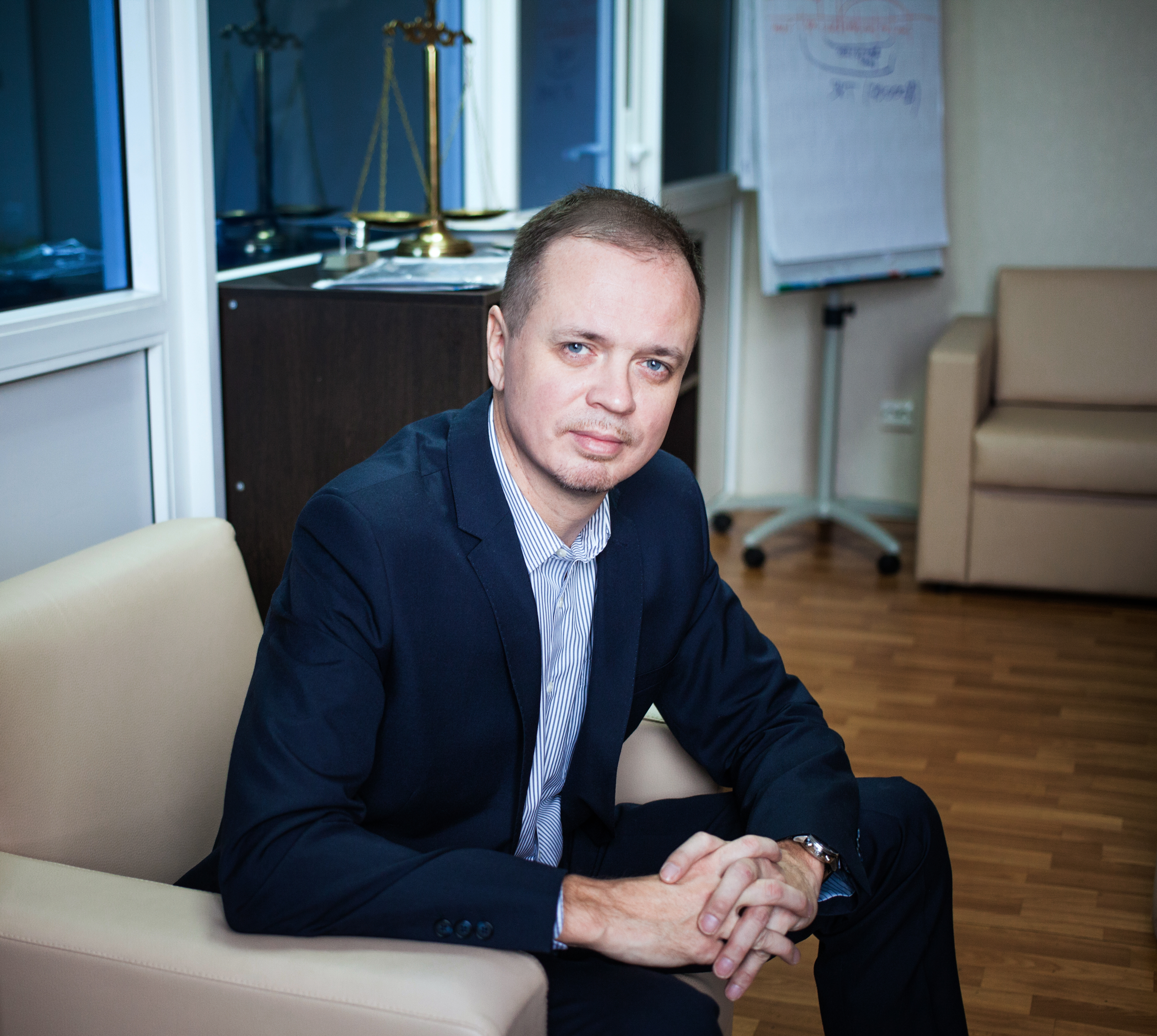
- Born: 13 January 1971; Saint Petersburg, Soviet Union
- Education: Saint Petersburg State University
- Occupations: Lawyer, human rights activist

Ivan Yuryevich Pavlov (Russian: Иван Юрьевич Павлов; born 13 January 1971 in St. Petersburg, Soviet Union) is a Russian advocate and open government activist. He participated in the development of Russian federal and regional freedom of information legislation. He specializes in protecting the right to access government information in Russia, and defending citizens from ungrounded accusations of disclosing state secrets, high treason, and espionage. Additionally, he focuses on raising public awareness of the need for modern legislation on state secrets and the use of current legislation as a means of repression.

As of 2022, his law office is in Tbilisi, Georgia; previously it had been in Russia.

== Biography ==
In 1997, Pavlov received his J.D. degree from St. Petersburg State University, and was admitted to the Russian defense bar. Pavlov received his Candidate of Law Science degree (Ph.D.) in 2009 from the Institute of State and Law, Russian Academy of Sciences.

From 1998-2004, Pavlov headed the Environmental Human Rights Center Bellona (St.-Petersburg, Russia).

== FOI initiatives ==
In 2004, Pavlov founded the Foundation “Institute for Information Freedom Development”, or Freedom of Information Foundation (FIF). For ten years, FIF rendered legal assistance to citizens and organizations, defending their rights to information access. FIF specialists also audited government bodies' official websites for compliance with actual FOI legislation requirements.

In 2014, FIF was included in the state register of "foreign agent" NGOs. After a series of court hearings where Pavlov and other lawyers of the FIF contested the "foreign agent" status, the Freedom of Information Foundation formally suspended its activities.

== Team 29 ==
However, the work has not ceased. Several ex-FIF staff members, led by Pavlov, have been joined by Team 29, the only Russian non-governmental initiative performing professional defense of the citizens’ right to freely look for, receive, transmit, produce, and distribute information by legal means. Team 29 transformed into a new organizational structure without having to create a legal entity, as a free partnership of lawyers, journalists, and civil activists. In 2015, Pavlov became the leader of Team 29. Since February 2015, Team 29 protects the rights of Russian citizens to court information and performs public outreach activities, publishing materials on governmental closeness and legal advice for citizens on its website.

On 16 July 2021, the website of Team 29 was blocked by Federal Service for Supervision of Communications, Information Technology and Mass Media at the request of Prosecutor General of Russia. According to official letter, Prosecutor General of Russia identifies the Team 29 to Czech nonprofit organization "Společnost Svobody Informace" which was designated undesirable on 29 June 2021. Team 29 doesn't agree with that but it made a decision to dissolve itself because of risks involved with criminal prosecution under article 284.1 of the Criminal Code of Russia against its members. Team 29 will delete its digital archive including judicial documents. Team 29 recommends to delete direct links to its documents because such links can be regarded as a participation in the activity of undesirable organization and be grounds for criminal prosecution. Former members of Team 29 will continue to work in their personal capacity.

== High-profile cases ==
=== Access to information ===
==== Access to texts of national standards ====
In 2006, Pavlov initiated a court case that resulted in a judicial obligation for the Federal Agency for Technical Regulation and Metrology (Russian: Rostechregulirovanie) to publish texts of national standards online. Previously, a fee was required for the public to access the standards. FIF lawyers won their victory in the first court instance in February of that year. The Rostechregulirovanie filed a cessation appeal. Its hearing was scheduled for 23 May 2006, but the federal agency's officials did not attend the court. The hearing session was adjourned to 8 June. On 31 May 2006, Pavlov was assaulted and taken to hospital with head injuries. Since the assaulters took none of his personal belongings, Pavlov linked the assault to his professional activities, namely the case on open online access to national standards. The criminal case was initiated but the criminals have not yet been found.

==== Contesting of the presidential decree on classification of information on military personnel losses in the time of peace ====
In 2015, Team 29 lawyers, led by Pavlov, prepared a claim against President Vladimir Putin's decree classifying information on military personnel losses within special operations during peacetime. The claim is supported by well-known human rights activists and journalists who believe that the decree would help state authorities to suppress the situation at the Ukrainian South-East. The team argued that Putin had exceeded his powers by classifying information regarding military losses as Russia's constitution clearly states the constitutional right to freely seek, receive and circulate information which can only be restricted by federal law. On 13 August 2015 the Supreme Court of the Russian Federation ruled the decree to be legal. The ruling gives grounds to apply to the constitutional court and request a proper assessment of how information in Russia is classified as state secret.

=== Defense of citizens persecuted by state security bodies ===
Pavlov has been involved with the defence of rights of citizens charged by state security bodies of high treason, unlawful access to security bodies’ secret archives, or state secret disclosure. According to statistical data from the Judicial Department under the Supreme Court of Russia, from 2010 until the first half of 2017, 57 sentences were given for high treason, 11 cases for espionage, and 137 cases for state secret disclosure. Zoya Svetova, a Russian human rights journalist, has defined the current state of affairs as immersion of Russia by “spy mania”.

==== High treason cases ====
===== The Alexander Nikitin case =====
Pavlov defended Alexander Nikitin, an environmentalist accused of high treason for having prepared the research report The Northern Fleet: A Potential Radioactive Contamination Threat for the Region. Nikitin was detained from February to December 1996; his case was widely covered by media, NGOs, and political organizations in Russia and Europe. Amnesty International recognized Nikitin as a prisoner of conscience. In 1998, the court sent the case back for further investigation. In 2000, Nikitin was fully acquitted by the Supreme Court of Russia.

===== The Grigory Pasko case =====
Pavlov represented Grigory Pasko, a military journalist arrested in 1997 and accused of high treason, alleging that when Pasko had flown from Russia to Japan, some documents had been taken from him and a preliminary studied had shown that they contained state secret-compromising information. The Amnesty International recognized Pasko, too, as a prisoner of conscience. In 1999, the military court of the Pacific Fleet sentenced Pasko to a year of imprisonment for abuse of official powers, immediately including amnesty; he was released from the courtroom.

In 2000, the Military Collegium of the Supreme Court of Russia canceled Pasko's sentence and the case was sent back for re-examination. On 25 December 2001 the military court of the Pacific Fleet found Pasko guilty of high treason in the form of espionage and sentenced him to four years of imprisonment. Having stayed in a penal colony for more than half a year, Pasko was released on parole.

===== The Svetlana Davydova case =====
Ivan Pavlov defended Svetlana Davydova, who had been accused of high treason for a phone call to the Ukrainian embassy. Davydova became the first person accused in accordance with Article 275, which states that any assistance to a foreign state or organization, or to its representative, in activities aimed against security of the Russian state, is considered high treason. The Davydova case is the first known accusation of pro-Ukraine espionage since the beginning of the war in Donbas.

According to the investigation, in April 2014, Davydova noticed that a military unit placed near her home was empty. She heard that a soldier from the associated military unit had said that he and his unit were being sent on a mission, and she informed the Ukrainian embassy. Eight months later, on 21 January 2015, she was arrested by an FSB operational group.

On 1 February 2015 Davydova dismissed her assigned counsel and replaced him with Pavlov and Sergey Badamshin. After introducing independent defence attorneys, she withdrew her previous testimony, explaining that she had made it under duress. On 13 March 2015 her attorneys stated that her case was dropped due to lack of evidence.

The Gennady Kravtsov case

In May 2014, Gennady Kravtsov, ex-officer of the Main Intelligence Directorate, was detained in Moscow upon suspicion of high treason. He left the service in the Main Intelligence Directorate in 2005 and had a foreign travel passport since 2011. The FSB public relations center informed that the case was initiated because Kravtsov had been supposed some information on Russian space intelligence activities to email to the radio engineering center of the Swedish ministry for defense. Kravtsov's wife, meanwhile, stated that he submitted a job resume to a Swedish organization and it was rejected since he was not a Swedish citizen. Kravtsov's defense team states that the resume contained no information comprising state secret.

As Kravtsov's defending attorney, Ivan Pavlov stated that the defense never denied the mere fact of resume submission but argued against the statement that the resume had contained any information comprising state secret. On 21 September 2015 the Moscow City Court sentenced Kravtsov to 14 years of imprisonment in a maximum security penal colony. On 4 February 2016 the Supreme Court of Russia revised Kravtsov's sentence and reduced his imprisonment term to 6 years.

The Evgeny Petrin case

Pavlov represented interests of Evgeny Petrin who had worked in the Moscow Patriarchy department of external church relations and was detained in June 2014 upon accusation of high treason. According to the investigation, Petrin had provided to the CIA representatives a piece of information comprising state secret when he had worked in the department of external church relations. Petrin himself stated that he was an FSB Captain and had worked in the church department under cover. His brother stated that Evgeny had detected a Ukrainian businessman who, according to Petrin's information, “had assisted to dissent between the Russian Orthodox Church and the Ukrainian one, had performed anti-Russian activities in Ukraine, and had recruited people, e.g., in Russian government bodies”. Evgeny Petrin more than once asked the security bodies to initiate a criminal case against that person. However, according to his brother, neither the Russian Orthodox Church nor the FSB had been interested in that so that “they decided to discredit Evgeny, to make him a traitor”.

On 14 June 2016 Petrin was sentenced to 12 years of imprisonment in a maximum security penal colony and to a fine of 200 thousand rubles for espionage in favor of the US. Pavlov, as Petrin's defending attorney, says that Petrin was “coerced” into confession. Pavlov assesses Petrin's sentence as “a compromise between severity of accusation and failure of evidence”: “The prosecutor demanded a cruel punishment, 19 years of imprisonment, and the Moscow City Court sentenced Evgeny to a minimal term of 12 years. Had he been really guilty, they should have punished him to the full extent. The court decision on a minimal term shows that it wend hard with the prosecution”.

The Sochi cases

In December 2016, Ivan Pavlov told about his new case in an interview for the Meduza. He then started defending Oksana Sevastidi sentenced by the Krasnodar Territorial Court to seven years of imprisonment in March 2016 for high treason. It was in 2008, before the Russo-Georgian war, that Sevastidi saw a train with military equipment moving in the direction of Abkhazia, and sent some SMS messages to an acquaintance of hers. In the beginning of 2015, she was arrested by security bodies who considered her SMSs high treason. Earlier, one similar case was known: Ekaterina Kharebava, a market saleswoman from Sochi, was in 2014 sentenced by the Krasnodar Territorial Court to six years of imprisonment for espionage. According to the investigation, in 2008 summer, Kharebava informed a military representative of Georgia on Russian troops’ movement.

According to Sevastidi, her first defending counsel, Ruslan Zurnadzhyan, made in fact nothing to defend her and never visited her in the pre-trial detention center. The Krasnodar Territory Bar Chamber inspected Zurnadzhyan's actions and found offense in them[50]. On 23 December 2016 President Vladimir Putin, at his annual press conference, promised to pay attention to Sevastidi's sentence. In February 2017, the Memorial human rights center recognized Sevastidi a political prisoner. On 7 March 2017 President Putin signed a decree granting pardon to Sevastidi. On 15 March the Supreme Court of Russia revised her sentence and reduced the punishment term from 7 to 3 years. After her release, Sevastidi told about Annik Kesyan, one more woman convicted for a SMS.

The Team 29 found that since 2013, the Krasnodar Territorial Court had issued at least ten sentences in case on high treason and espionage, convicting Ekaterina Kharebava, Oksana Sevastidi, Annik Kesyan, Marina Dzhandzhgava, Inga Tutisani, Manana Kapanadze, Petr Parpulov, Leval Latariya, Georgy Pataraya, and Georgy Khurtsilava. Investigators, judges, and the prosecutor were the same practically in all cases and many of them got promotion after those cases. For instance, Roman Troyan, former investigator, became head of the FSB Investigative Department for Krasnodar Territory. Leonid Korzhinek, prosecutor in the Kharebava, Dzhandzhgava, and Sevastidi cases, became Deputy Prosecutor General of Russia in 2016.

The Team 29 journalists found that at least six women (Ekaterina Kharebava, Oksana Sevastidi, Annik Kesyan, Marina Dzhandzhgava, Inga Tutisani, and Manana Kapanadze) were convicted just for SMS messages on open movements of military equipment to their acquaintances in Georgia. After that, the Team 29 attorneys entered the cases of Annik Kesyan, Marina Dzhandzhgava, and Inga Tutisani. On 29 July 2017 Vladimir Putin signed decrees on pardon for Marina Dzhandzhgava and Annik Kesyan; on 16 November 2017 Supreme Court revised Inga Tutisani's sentence and reduced her punishment term from 6 years to 4 years and 1 month. All three women were released.

On 16 March 2018 Ivan Pavlov informed on entrance of the case of Petr Parpulov, an ex-flight dispatcher from Sochi convicted by the Krasnodar Territorial Court. Parpulov was convicted to 12 years of imprisonment in a maximum security penal colony in January 2016 for high treason (Article 275 of the Criminal Code of Russia). On 12 March Parpulov's family was notified that he was denied of pardon.

==== Extremism cases ====
The Regional Press Institute case

Ivan Pavlov represented in court interests of the Regional Press Institute contesting fine imposed for the refusal to self-register as a “foreign agent” NGO and of its director, Anna Sharogradskaya, when they planned to initiate a criminal case for extremism against her. As a result, the Investigative Committee of Russia refused to initiate a criminal case against Sharogradskaya and the Supreme Court of Russia cancelled the lower-instance court decision on the fine for the Regional Press Institute.

The Natalia Sharina case

Ivan Pavlov defended Natalia Sharina, ex-Director of the Library for Ukrainian Literature in Moscow, accused of distribution of extremist literature through the library (Article 282 of the Criminal Code of Russia, part 2) and of misspending of money spent for lawyers; work (Article 160, part 4). Sharina was detained in 2015 and spent more than a year under home arrest. Employees of the library told that the books Sharina allegedly had distributed in fact had been planted within the search. Sharina's defense team pointed vagueness and absurdness of the charges against her: she had not been in charge of the library stock acquisition and fees for the lawyers had been permitted by the Department for Culture of the Government of Moscow. Finally, the court found Sharina guilty and gave her a 4-year suspended sentence.

The case of Scientologists in St. Petersburg

Ivan Pavlov served as a defending attorney for Sakhib Aliyev, chief accountant and one of the five members of the St.-Petersburg Scientologist Church, accused of illegal business practices and religious extremism. Pavlov is sure that “the case of Scientologists is a shameful page in the new history of Russian justice” since he believes that “they persecute them for their faith, trying to consider them extremists” and that “FSB already tries to dictate to the public what gods they may or may not worship”.

==== Other cases involving state security bodies ====
The Igor Baranov case

In 2013, Pavlov achieved termination of the criminal persecution of Igor Baranov, Professor of the Baltic State Technical University (St.-Petersburg, Russia), accused of “an attempt to cross the state border with materials that can be used for production of massive weapons” (the material in question was Baranov's paper report for an international research conference).

The Raoul Wallenberg case

Ivan Pavlov and the Team 29 represent in courts interests of the family of Raoul Wallenberg, Swedish diplomat who saved tens of thousands of Jews from the Holocaust during the World War II. In 1945, Soviet troops entered Budapest and Wallenberg was arrested by SMERSH officers. In 1957, the Soviet government confirmed the information on capture of Wallenberg and informed that he died from a heart attack in 1947 in the Lubyanka Prison. Wallenberg's family and the Raoul Wallenberg Research Initiative (RWI-70) research group seek for disclosure of Soviet archives that can contain information on Wallenberg's fate. The Russian government refuses to provide important documents, referring to their secrecy or to personal and family secrets the documents contain.

On 29 March 2017 Wallenberg's relatives submitted official requests to the Federal Security Service of Russia (FSB), asking to provide documents that could shed light to Wallenberg's fate. The FSB refused to respond to the requests so that the Team 29 and Wallenberg's family members sued the FSB. On 18 September 2017 the Meschansky district court of Moscow rejected the family's claim. On 20 February 2018 the Moscow City Court let stand the decision of the Meschansky district court. Pavlov stated that he was planning to file a cassation appeal and then “direct way to the European Court for Human Rights is opened”.

=== Other cases ===
The case on search of the Memorial Research Center

In 2009, Ivan Pavlov managed to achieve a court decision considering unlawful the search that had been performed by investigative bodies in the Memorial Research Center (St.-Petersburg, Russia).

==== The Suprun case ====
Ivan Pavlov defended Mikhail Suprun, a historian accused of privacy abuse in 2009 for preparing a memory book of Soviet political repression victims. In January 2014, the European Court for Human Rights started communicating with the Government of the Russian Federation upon the application from Suprun and Pavlov.

==== The "Troll Factory" case ====
In St. Petersburg there is a company whose employees are paid for aggressive pro-governmental posts and comments in the Internet. Lyudmila Savchuk, a former employee of that "troll-factory", sought to disclose its activities and filed a claim in court for labor violations. Ivan Pavlov represented Ms. Savchuk, and the defendant "troll-factory" agreed to pay Savchuk her withheld salaries and to restore her labor rights.

The Aleksandr Eivazov case

Ivan Pavlov is defending Aleksandr Eivazov, former judicial session secretary in the Oktyabrsky district court of St.-Petersburg who told publicly of law violations in the court. Eivazov took the position of judicial session secretary in the Oktyabrsky district court of St.-Petersburg in October 2016. According to his own words, he regularly met law violations (e.g. by judges) in the court. In December 2016, he left the job and submitted to the Ministry for Interior, to the Investigative Committee, to public prosecution, and to some other government bodies tens of complaints against labor law violations, procedural breaches, and ethics abuse by officials.

In August 2017, Eivazov was arrested and charged of legal obstruction. According to the investigation, Eivazov had not executed a number of documents in a proper way, trying to damage the judge he had conflicted. Eivazov himself stated that he had not finalized and signed a protocol for one case, having first been on medical leave and then left the job in court immediately; he had considered that it would have been a law violation for him to sign a protocol ex post facto, being not an official of the court. In January 2018, upon a statement by Judge Irina Kerro he had worked with, Eivazov was charged also of libel against her.

Since August 2017, Eivazov, suffering from severe bronchial asthma, is kept in a pre-trial detention center; his defending attorneys filed a number of motion for his hospitalization.

On 19 January 2018 information came on completion of the case preliminary investigation; on 23 January the investigator commissioned a psychological and psychiatric expert evaluation of Eivazov. On 14 February 2018 his defending attorneys informed on possible forgery of evidence: a blank protocol of victim familiarization with the case materials, signed by Judge Irina Kerro but neither filled nor dated, was found in the case files.

The Memorial human rights center recognized Eivazov a political prisoner, and Amnesty International, a prisoner of conscience.

== Awards ==
In 2015, Ivan Pavlov received the Moscow Helsinki Group Award for defending human rights in court.

In March 2018, he received the Alison Des Forges Award for Extraordinary Activism, awarded by the Human Rights Watch to activists who put their lives on the line to protect the dignity and rights of others.

== Persecution by Russian authorities ==
=== Criminal prosecution ===
On 30 April 2021, Ivan Pavlov was detained. He was charged in the violation of the secret of the investigation, specifically the disclosing contents of the investigator's decision, in the case of Ivan Safronov accused of treason allegedly committed at a time when Safronov was journalist. The investigator's decision was not classified as state secret, and Russian legislation does not provide for the obligation for an advocate to keep a secret of the investigation. The Bar association of Saint Petersburg, of which Ivan Pavlov is a member, stated that criminal proceedings against Ivan Pavlov is contrary to the law.

=== Emigration ===
Ivan Pavlov left Russia on 7 September 2021 due to the impossibility to proceed his activity as an advocate as a result of the persecution by Russian authorities.

=== "Foreign agent" status ===
On 8 November 2021, Ivan Pavlov was labeled as "foreign agent" by the decision of Ministry of Justice of the Russian Federation. Ivan Pavlov stated that he would not mark his messages in social media as "distributed by foreign agent", as required by Russian law.

=== Suspension of advocate's status ===
On 15 March 2022, the counsil of the advocate's chamber of Saint Petersburg decided to suspend the advocate's status of Ivan Pavlov due to the fact that "he had not been able to perform his professional duties for more than six months". The decision of this suspension was made on involuntary basis because Pavlov had not filed an application for suspension his advocate's status. The president of the advocate's chamber warned Pavlov personally that he had the right to carry out advocate's activity no more (even on non-profit ground) under the sanction of involuntary termination of the advocate's status and lifetime deprivation of the right to represent people in courts. Pavlov stated that he would appeal the decision of the advocate's chamber.
