= Military Courts (Russia) =

Flag of the Military Court of Russia

Military courts of the Russian Federation (Military tribunals before 21 April 1992) are Federal ordinary courts that are part of Russian Judicial system, exercising judicial power in the Russian Armed Forces, other troops, military formations and bodies in which military service is provided for by federal law.

== History of military courts ==
In 1716, as part of the creation of the regular army and navy in Russia, Peter the Great established by his decree the "Correct Independent Military Court." A little later, the military manual (the first Russian military Criminal Code) was approved.

During the military reforms of Emperor Alexander II in the second half of the 19th century, a major military judicial reform was carried out. On May 15, 1867, the Military Judicial Statute was adopted and a new military judicial structure was formed: regimental courts, military district courts and the Main Military Court. The district and Main Military Courts consisted of permanent military judges, who were selected by the Minister of War and appointed by order of the Emperor. The ranks for the military judicial department were supplied from among the graduate officers of the Alexander Military Law Academy, which was specially created for their training. They were equivalent in their position to officers who graduated from the General Staff Academy.

After the October Revolution, the former system of military courts was completely abandoned and a new one was created anew. In the RSFSR and the USSR, military courts were called "military tribunals." They were established in 1918 on all fronts and in active armies, and on October 14 of the same year, by order of the Revolutionary Military Council of the Republic, the Revolutionary Military Tribunal of the Republic was formed. The first Regulation on military tribunals was approved in 1919. In the absence of criminal legislation (the first Soviet codes were adopted only in 1922), the military tribunals of the Civil War period (apart from them, there were revolutionary tribunals to try cases of crimes committed by citizens) were mostly punitive bodies. In 1921, the Military Collegium of the Revolutionary Military Tribunal of the Republic was formed, which in January 1923 was incorporated into the Supreme Court of the RSFSR, and in April 1924 into the Supreme Court of the USSR.

During the Great Patriotic War (1941-1945), a large range of acts and persons who committed them were transferred from ordinary courts to the jurisdiction of military tribunals (for example, they considered cases of any crimes committed in areas declared under martial law, any cases of crimes committed by railway, river and sea transport workers, persons consisting of in the people's militia and in extermination formations, in units of the MPVO, in the paramilitary security of the NKVD and others). They were also assigned to consider cases of atrocities in the occupied territory committed by Soviet traitors, as well as by members of the German army and employees of the occupation administration. Each division in the active army had a military field court (in peacetime, the lowest instance of the military courts were on the corps level). The cases were reviewed in a short time, and as a tool for overseeing court decisions, the approval of sentences by Military Councils of armies and fronts, and solely by corps and division commanders (with the right to reduce the severity of the sentence or cancel it) was introduced. After the end of the war, peacetime jurisdiction was restored.
