= Team 29 =

Association of lawyers and journalists

The Team 29 is an informal association of lawyers and journalists aimed to counteract growing governmental closeness in Russia. The Team has worked since February 2015. Its leader is Ivan Pavlov, legal attorney. Most of the Team 29 members are ex-employees of the Freedom of Information Foundation, a NGO that worked in the field of FOI promotion and defense in Russia since 2004 and was in 2014 included in the list of "foreign agent" NGOs. Working now without a legal entity in Russia, the Foundation team has managed to continue their work despite governmental pressure over independent civic initiatives.

== Legal Activities ==
- Termination of criminal persecution of Svetlana Davydova, a mother of many children, charged of high treason for a phone call to the Ukrainian embassy.
- Contesting President Vladimir Putin's Decree classifying information on military personnel losses in the time of peace.
- Victory in a judicial dispute between an ex-employee of the "pro-Kremlin online troll fabric" against her former employer. The court trial has catalyzed public attention to the problem of paid online propaganda in Russia.
- Victory in the Constitutional Court of Russia: the Team 29 lawyers have achieved that child adoption secrecy is considered not absolute.

== Public Outreach ==
The Team 29 issued several media projects presenting legal guides for activists and the wide public. Within counteracting governmental closeness growth, the Team has launched "Closeness Chronicles", a chronology of governmental closeness growth facts happened in Russia during Vladimir Putin's last Presidency.

== Termination of the activities ==
On 16 July 2021, the website of the Team 29 was blocked by Federal Service for Supervision of Communications, Information Technology and Mass Media at the request of Prosecutor General of Russia. According to official letter, Prosecutor General of Russia identifies the Team 29 to Czech nonprofit organization "Společnost Svobody Informace" which was designated undesirable on 29 June 2021. The Team 29 doesn't agree with that but it has to make decision to dissolve itself because of risks involved with criminal prosecution under the article 284.1 of the Criminal Code of Russia against its members. The Team 29 will delete its digital archive including judicial documents. The Team 29 recommends to delete direct links to its documents because such links can be regarded as a participation in the activity of undesirable organization and be grounds for criminal prosecution. Former members of the Team 29 will continue to work in their personal capacity.
