= Natalya Sharina =

Director of the Ukrainian Literature Library in Moscow

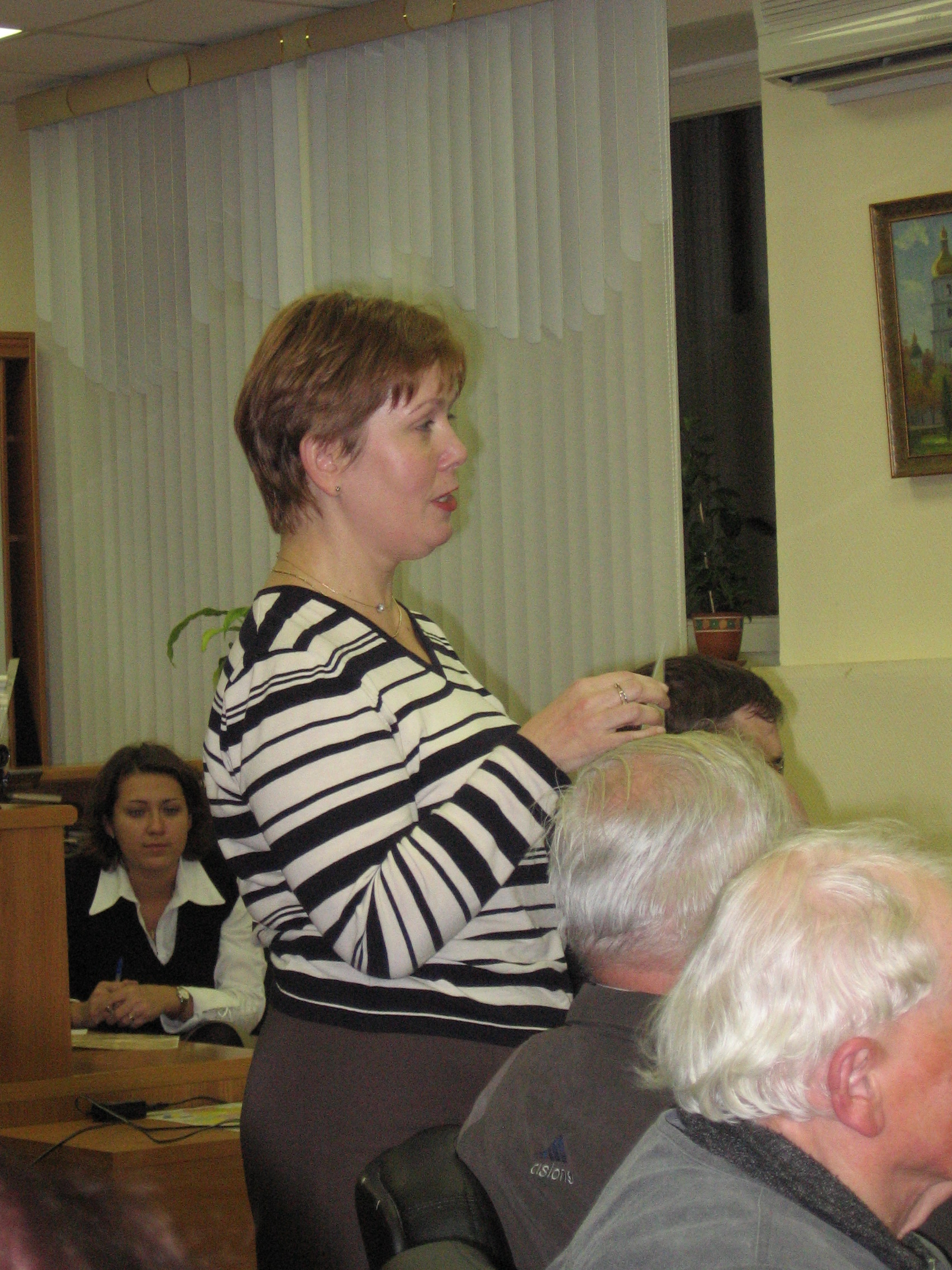
- Born: 13 July 1957 (age 68)

Natalya Grigorevna Sharina (Russian: Наталья Григорьевна Шарина; born 13 July 1957) is the director of the Ukrainian Literature Library in Moscow. She was put under house arrest in 2015 under the charges of inciting ethnic hatred and spreading "anti-Russian propaganda". In 2016, Sharina was put on trial for disseminating banned literature and embezzling library funds.

Ukraine officially protested against the arrest of Sharina, who has been designated a political prisoner by human rights organization Memorial. Human Rights Watch demanded her immediate release.

== Arrest and charges ==
The Ukrainian Literature Library, located in central Moscow, stocks some 60,000 books mainly in the Ukrainian language. In 2010, the Russian interior ministry’s anti-extremism department confiscated about 50 books and a case on inciting ethnic hatred was opened. Sharina became the library director in 2011.

In October 2015, she was detained on suspicion of inciting ethnic hatred. An investigative committee ordered her arrest after the investigators found books in the library that allegedly disseminated "anti-Russian propaganda", such as the books of Dmytro Korchynsky, which are banned in Russia. Similar charges had been made against her in 2010, but they turned out to be baseless, and were dropped by the authorities in 2013. But the new case against her claimed that she used library funds to pay for her legal defense in the old case.

On 2 November, Sharina was placed under house arrest and banned from speaking directly to journalists. She denied the charges, saying the banned books were "planted during the searches," a claim that was repeated by staff members. About half the librarians from the Ukrainian Library were summoned for questioning and at least two employees had their apartments searched by police in early morning raids.

Her trial for disseminating banned literature classed as extremist and for embezzling library funds began on 2 November 2016. She pleaded not guilty and said that books had been planted in the library. On 5 June 2017 she was found guilty of inciting hatred to Russians and embezzlement. She received a four-year suspended sentence.

== Reactions ==
The case was widely covered in Russian state-owned media. NTV television channel ran a short documentary in December 2015 alleging the library carried out the orders of the Ukrainian security services at the behest of the CIA.

The Ukrainian foreign ministry issued a note of protest, describing the investigation as "not the first attempt of the Kremlin's to put the labels of 'Russophobia' and 'extremism' on everything that's Ukrainian". Sharina was designated a political prisoner by Russian human rights organization Memorial. Human Rights Watch called for her immediate release. Amnesty International reacted to Sharina's conviction stating "The prosecution has exploited the highly charged anti-Ukrainian atmosphere that is prevalent in Russia at the moment, while the court simply dismissed key evidence for the defense".
