= Autonomous oblasts of Russia =

Type of federal subject of Russia

An autonomous oblast (Russian: автономная область, romanized: avtonómnaya óblastʹ) is a type of federal subject of the Russian Federation. An autonomous oblast has greater autonomy than other oblasts, but not as much as a republic.

Autonomous Oblasts of Russia (purple)

From 1977 to 1991, the Russian Soviet Federative Socialist Republic had five autonomous oblasts: Adygea, Gorno-Altai, Karachay-Cherkessia, Khakassia, and the Jewish Autonomous Oblast. The first four were elevated to republics on 3 July 1991, during the dissolution of the Soviet Union, leaving only the Jewish Autonomous Oblast in independent Russia.

== See also ==
- Autonomous oblasts of the Soviet Union
- Federal subjects of Russia
- Oblasts of Russia
- Republics of Russia
- Krais of Russia
- Federal cities of Russia
- Jewish Autonomous Oblast
