= Voskresensky (inhabited locality) =

Voskresensky (Russian: Воскресе́нский; masculine), Voskresenskaya (Воскресе́нская; feminine), or Voskresenskoye (Воскресе́нское; neuter) is the name of several inhabited localities in Russia.

== Republic of Bashkortostan ==
As of 2010, three rural localities in the Republic of Bashkortostan bear this name:

- Voskresenskoye, Kugarchinsky District, Republic of Bashkortostan, a village in Zarechensky Selsoviet of Kugarchinsky District
- Voskresenskoye, Meleuzovsky District, Republic of Bashkortostan, a selo in Voskresensky Selsoviet of Meleuzovsky District
- Voskresenskoye, Zilairsky District, Republic of Bashkortostan, a selo in Yuldybayevsky Selsoviet of Zilairsky District

== Bryansk Oblast ==
As of 2010, one rural locality in Bryansk Oblast bears this name:

- Voskresensky, Bryansk Oblast, a settlement in Mylinsky Selsoviet of Karachevsky District

== Chelyabinsk Oblast ==
As of 2010, one rural locality in Chelyabinsk Oblast bears this name:

- Voskresenskoye, Chelyabinsk Oblast, a selo in Tyubuksky Selsoviet of Kaslinsky District

== Ivanovo Oblast ==
As of 2010, five rural localities in Ivanovo Oblast bear this name:

- Voskresenskoye, Ilyinsky District, Ivanovo Oblast, a selo in Ilyinsky District
- Voskresenskoye, Kineshemsky District, Ivanovo Oblast, a selo in Kineshemsky District
- Voskresenskoye, Lezhnevsky District, Ivanovo Oblast, a selo in Lezhnevsky District
- Voskresenskoye, Rodnikovsky District, Ivanovo Oblast, a village in Rodnikovsky District
- Voskresenskoye, Savinsky District, Ivanovo Oblast, a selo in Savinsky District

== Kaliningrad Oblast ==
As of 2010, one rural locality in Kaliningrad Oblast bears this name:

- Voskresenskoye, Kaliningrad Oblast, a settlement in Prigorodny Rural Okrug of Nesterovsky District

== Kaluga Oblast ==
As of 2010, one rural locality in Kaluga Oblast bears this name:

- Voskresenskoye, Kaluga Oblast, a selo in Ferzikovsky District

== Khabarovsk Krai ==
As of 2010, one rural locality in Khabarovsk Krai bears this name:

- Voskresenskoye, Khabarovsk Krai, a selo in Ulchsky District

== Kostroma Oblast ==
As of 2010, four rural localities in Kostroma Oblast bear this name:

- Voskresenskoye, Antropovsky District, Kostroma Oblast, a village in Kotelnikovskoye Settlement of Antropovsky District
- Voskresenskoye, Galichsky District, Kostroma Oblast, a selo in Orekhovskoye Settlement of Galichsky District
- Voskresenskoye, Nerekhtsky District, Kostroma Oblast, a selo in Voskresenskoye Settlement of Nerekhtsky District
- Voskresenskoye, Ostrovsky District, Kostroma Oblast, a selo in Klevantsovskoye Settlement of Ostrovsky District

== Kurgan Oblast ==
As of 2010, one rural locality in Kurgan Oblast bears this name:

- Voskresenskoye, Kurgan Oblast, a village in Voskresensky Selsoviet of Polovinsky District

== Leningrad Oblast ==
As of 2010, two rural localities in Leningrad Oblast bear this name:

- Voskresenskoye, Gatchinsky District, Leningrad Oblast, a slobodka in Kobrinskoye Settlement Municipal Formation of Gatchinsky District
- Voskresenskoye, Volkhovsky District, Leningrad Oblast, a village in Khvalovskoye Settlement Municipal Formation of Volkhovsky District

== Lipetsk Oblast ==
As of 2010, three rural localities in Lipetsk Oblast bear this name:

- Voskresenskoye, Chaplyginsky District, Lipetsk Oblast, a village in Bratovsky Selsoviet of Chaplyginsky District
- Voskresenskoye, Oktyabrsky Selsoviet, Dankovsky District, Lipetsk Oblast, a selo in Oktyabrsky Selsoviet of Dankovsky District
- Voskresenskoye, Voskresensky Selsoviet, Dankovsky District, Lipetsk Oblast, a selo in Voskresensky Selsoviet of Dankovsky District

== Mari El Republic ==
As of 2010, two rural localities in the Mari El Republic bear this name:

- Voskresensky, Mari El Republic, a khutor in Bolsheparatsky Rural Okrug of Volzhsky District
- Voskresenskoye, Mari El Republic, a village in Kuzhmarinsky Rural Okrug of Sovetsky District

== Moscow Oblast ==
As of 2010, five rural localities in Moscow Oblast bear this name:

- Voskresenskoye, Kashirsky District, Moscow Oblast, a village in Znamenskoye Rural Settlement of Kashirsky District
- Voskresenskoye, Noginsky District, Moscow Oblast, a selo in Yamkinskoye Rural Settlement of Noginsky District
- Voskresenskoye, Ramensky District, Moscow Oblast, a selo in Konstantinovskoye Rural Settlement of Ramensky District
- Voskresenskoye, Ruzsky District, Moscow Oblast, a village in Staroruzskoye Rural Settlement of Ruzsky District
- Voskresenskoye, Shakhovskoy District, Moscow Oblast, a village in Ramenskoye Rural Settlement of Shakhovskoy District

== Nizhny Novgorod Oblast ==
As of 2010, three inhabited localities in Nizhny Novgorod Oblast bear this name:

- Voskresenskoye, Voskresensky District, Nizhny Novgorod Oblast, an urban locality (a work settlement) in Voskresensky District
- Voskresenskoye, Sergachsky District, Nizhny Novgorod Oblast, a rural locality (a selo) in Andreyevsky Selsoviet of Sergachsky District
- Voskresenskoye, Tonshayevsky District, Nizhny Novgorod Oblast, a rural locality (a village) in Berezyatsky Selsoviet of Tonshayevsky District

== Novgorod Oblast ==
As of 2010, two rural localities in Novgorod Oblast bear this name:

- Voskresenskoye, Maryovsky District, Novgorod Oblast, a village in Molvotitskoye Settlement of Maryovsky District
- Voskresenskoye, Pestovsky District, Novgorod Oblast, a village in Bykovskoye Settlement of Pestovsky District

== Oryol Oblast ==
As of 2010, three rural localities in Oryol Oblast bear this name:

- Voskresensky, Bolkhovsky District, Oryol Oblast, a settlement in Borovskoy Selsoviet of Bolkhovsky District
- Voskresensky, Dmitrovsky District, Oryol Oblast, a settlement in Domakhovsky Selsoviet of Dmitrovsky District
- Voskresensky, Kromskoy District, Oryol Oblast, a settlement in Retyazhsky Selsoviet of Kromskoy District

== Perm Krai ==
As of 2010, two rural localities in Perm Krai bear this name:

- Voskresenskoye, Perm Krai, a selo in Uinsky District
- Voskresenskaya, Perm Krai, a village in Sivinsky District

== Pskov Oblast ==
As of 2010, three rural localities in Pskov Oblast bear this name:

- Voskresenskoye, Gdovsky District, Pskov Oblast, a village in Gdovsky District
- Voskresenskoye, Pskovsky District, Pskov Oblast, a village in Pskovsky District
- Voskresenskoye, Pushkinogorsky District, Pskov Oblast, a village in Pushkinogorsky District

== Saratov Oblast ==
As of 2010, one rural locality in Saratov Oblast bears this name:

- Voskresenskoye, Saratov Oblast, a selo in Voskresensky District

== Stavropol Krai ==
As of 2010, one rural locality in Stavropol Krai bears this name:

- Voskresenskaya, Stavropol Krai, a stanitsa in Novoalexandrovsky District

== Republic of Tatarstan ==
As of 2010, one rural locality in the Republic of Tatarstan bears this name:

- Voskresensky, Republic of Tatarstan, a settlement in Kaybitsky District

== Tver Oblast ==
As of 2010, eight rural localities in Tver Oblast bear this name:

- Voskresenskoye, Andreapolsky District, Tver Oblast, a selo in Andreapolsky District
- Voskresenskoye, Kalininsky District, Tver Oblast, a village in Kalininsky District
- Voskresenskoye, Kalyazinsky District, Tver Oblast, a village in Kalyazinsky District
- Voskresenskoye, Likhoslavlsky District, Tver Oblast, a village in Likhoslavlsky District
- Voskresenskoye, Molokovsky District, Tver Oblast, a village in Molokovsky District
- Voskresenskoye, Sonkovsky District, Tver Oblast, a village in Sonkovsky District
- Voskresenskoye, Zubtsovsky District, Tver Oblast, two villages in Zubtsovsky District

== Vladimir Oblast ==
As of 2010, four rural localities in Vladimir Oblast bear this name:

- Voskresenskoye, Alexandrovsky District, Vladimir Oblast, a village in Alexandrovsky District
- Voskresenskoye, Kameshkovsky District, Vladimir Oblast, a selo in Kameshkovsky District
- Voskresenskoye, Kolchuginsky District, Vladimir Oblast, a selo in Kolchuginsky District
- Voskresenskoye, Yuryev-Polsky District, Vladimir Oblast, a village in Yuryev-Polsky District

== Vologda Oblast ==
As of 2010, seven rural localities in Vologda Oblast bear this name:

- Voskresenskoye, Babushkinsky District, Vologda Oblast, a selo in Bereznikovsky Selsoviet of Babushkinsky District
- Voskresenskoye, Musorsky Selsoviet, Cherepovetsky District, Vologda Oblast, a selo in Musorsky Selsoviet of Cherepovetsky District
- Voskresenskoye, Voskresensky Selsoviet, Cherepovetsky District, Vologda Oblast, a selo in Voskresensky Selsoviet of Cherepovetsky District
- Voskresenskoye, Gryazovetsky District, Vologda Oblast, a selo in Vederkovsky Selsoviet of Gryazovetsky District
- Voskresenskoye, Borisovsky Selsoviet, Vologodsky District, Vologda Oblast, a village in Borisovsky Selsoviet of Vologodsky District
- Voskresenskoye, Sosnovsky Selsoviet, Vologodsky District, Vologda Oblast, a village in Sosnovsky Selsoviet of Vologodsky District
- Voskresenskoye, Vozhegodsky District, Vologda Oblast, a selo in Punemsky Selsoviet of Vozhegodsky District

== Voronezh Oblast ==
As of 2010, one rural locality in Voronezh Oblast bears this name:

- Voskresensky, Voronezh Oblast, a settlement in Voznesenovskoye Rural Settlement of Talovsky District

== Yaroslavl Oblast ==
As of 2010, eight rural localities in Yaroslavl Oblast bear this name:

- Voskresenskoye, Lyubimsky District, Yaroslavl Oblast, a selo in Voskresensky Rural Okrug of Lyubimsky District
- Voskresenskoye, Myshkinsky District, Yaroslavl Oblast, a selo in Rozhdestvensky Rural Okrug of Myshkinsky District
- Voskresenskoye, Latskovsky Rural Okrug, Nekouzsky District, Yaroslavl Oblast, a selo in Latskovsky Rural Okrug of Nekouzsky District
- Voskresenskoye, Rodionovsky Rural Okrug, Nekouzsky District, Yaroslavl Oblast, a selo in Rodionovsky Rural Okrug of Nekouzsky District
- Voskresenskoye, Pereslavsky District, Yaroslavl Oblast, a village in Glebovsky Rural Okrug of Pereslavsky District
- Voskresenskoye, Poshekhonsky District, Yaroslavl Oblast, a selo in Vasilyevsky Rural Okrug of Poshekhonsky District
- Voskresenskoye, Ilyinsky Rural Okrug, Uglichsky District, Yaroslavl Oblast, a selo in Ilyinsky Rural Okrug of Uglichsky District
- Voskresenskoye, Ninorovsky Rural Okrug, Uglichsky District, Yaroslavl Oblast, a village in Ninorovsky Rural Okrug of Uglichsky District
