= Voskresensky =

Voskresensky (Russian: Воскресенский; masculine), Voskresenskaya (Воскресенская; feminine), or Voskresenskoye (Воскресенское; neuter) may refer to:

== People ==
- Alexander Voskresensky (1809–1880), Russian chemist
- Vasily Voskresensky (1880–1951), Russian ballet impresario, better known as Wassily de Basil
- Petr Voskresensky-Stekanov, Russian and German human rights and LGBTQ activist
- Leonid A. Voskresenskiy (1913–1965), Soviet rocket engineer and launch director for Sputnik
- Mikhail Voskresensky (1935– ), Russian Pianist
- Yury Voskresensky (1977– ), Belarusian politician and businessman

== Places ==
- Voskresensky District, several districts in Russia
- Voskresensky (inhabited locality) (Voskresenskaya, Voskresenskoye), several inhabited localities in Russia
- Voskresenskoye Settlement, a municipal formation in Novomoskovsky Administrative Okrug of the federal city of Moscow, Russia

== Other ==
- Voskresensky Gate, the only existing gate in Kitai-gorod, Moscow, Russia
- Voskresenskiy, lunar impact crater named after Leonid A. Voskresenskiy

== See also ==
- Voskresensk
- Voskresenovka
