= Maxyutovo, Zilairsky District, Republic of Bashkortostan =

Maksyutovo Максютово
- Village
- Location within Bashkortostan Location within Russia
- Coordinates: 52°16′N 57°46′E
- Country: Russia
- Region: Bashkortostan
- District: Zilairsky District
- Time zone: UTC+5:00

Maksyutovo (Russian: Максютово; Bashkir: Мәҡсүт, Mäqsüt) is a rural locality (a village) in Kashkarovsky Selsoviet, Zilairsky District, Bashkortostan, Russia. The population was 83 as of 2010. There are 2 streets.

== Geography ==
Maksyutovo is located 39 km east of Zilair (the district's administrative centre) by road. Izhbuldy is the nearest rural locality.
