= Novopokrovsky, Republic of Bashkortostan =

Novopokrovsky Новопокровский
- Village
- Location within Bashkortostan Location within Russia
- Coordinates: 52°28′N 57°10′E
- Country: Russia
- Region: Bashkortostan
- District: Zilairsky District
- Time zone: UTC+5:00

Novopokrovsky (Russian: Новопокровский) is a rural locality (a village) in Dmitriyevsky Selsoviet, Zilairsky District, Bashkortostan, Russia. The population was 65 as of 2010. There are 2 streets.

== Geography ==
Novopokrovsky is located 39 km northwest of Zilair (the district's administrative centre) by road. Muchetbar is the nearest rural locality.
