= Aralbayevo =

Aralbayevo Аралбаево
- Village
- Location within Bashkortostan Location within Russia
- Coordinates: 52°09′N 57°53′E
- Country: Russia
- Region: Bashkortostan
- District: Zilairsky District
- Time zone: UTC+5:00

Aralbayevo (Russian: Аралбаево; Bashkir: Аралбай, Aralbay) is a rural locality (a village) in Verkhnegaleyevsky Selsoviet, Zilairsky District, Bashkortostan, Russia. The population was 1 as of 2010. There is 1 street.

== Geography ==
Aralbayevo is located 73 km southeast of Zilair (the district's administrative centre) by road. Verkhnegaleyevo is the nearest rural locality.
