= Novoalexandrovka, Zilairsky District, Republic of Bashkortostan =

Novoalexandrovka Новоалександровка
- Selo
- Location within Bashkortostan Location within Russia
- Coordinates: 52°06′N 57°15′E
- Country: Russia
- Region: Bashkortostan
- District: Zilairsky District
- Time zone: UTC+5:00

Novoalexandrovka (Russian: Новоалександровка) is a rural locality (a selo) in Berdyashsky Selsoviet, Zilairsky District, Bashkortostan, Russia. The population was 119 as of 2010. There are 3 streets.

== Geography ==
Novoalexandrovka is located 30 km southwest of Zilair (the district's administrative centre) by road. Berdyash is the nearest rural locality.
