= Kanzafarovo =

Kanzafarovo Канзафарово
- Village
- Location within Bashkortostan Location within Russia
- Coordinates: 52°10′N 57°45′E
- Country: Russia
- Region: Bashkortostan
- District: Zilairsky District
- Time zone: UTC+5:00

Kanzafarovo (Russian: Канзафарово; Bashkir: Ҡәнзәфәр, Qänzäfär) is a rural locality (a village) in Kanzafarovsky Selsoviet, Zilairsky District, Bashkortostan, Russia. The population was 45 as of 2010. There is 1 street.

== Geography ==
Kanzafarovo is located 30 km southeast of Zilair (the district's administrative centre) by road. Yumaguzhino is the nearest rural locality.
