= Novoyakupovo =

Novoyakupovo Новоякупово
- Village
- Location within Bashkortostan Location within Russia
- Coordinates: 52°13′N 57°45′E
- Country: Russia
- Region: Bashkortostan
- District: Zilairsky District
- Time zone: UTC+5:00

Novoyakupovo (Russian: Новоякупово; Bashkir: Яңы Яҡуп, Yañı Yaqup) is a rural locality (a village) in Kanzafarovsky Selsoviet, Zilairsky District, Bashkortostan, Russia. The population was 26 as of 2010. There is 1 street.

== Geography ==
Novoyakupovo is located 28 km east of Zilair (the district's administrative centre) by road. Yumaguzhino is the nearest rural locality.
