= Sidorovka, Zilairsky District, Republic of Bashkortostan =

Sidorovka Сидоровка
- Village
- Location within Bashkortostan Location within Russia
- Coordinates: 52°10′N 57°59′E
- Country: Russia
- Region: Bashkortostan
- District: Zilairsky District
- Time zone: UTC+5:00

Sidorovka (Russian: Сидоровка) is a rural locality (a village) in Verkhnegaleyevsky Selsoviet, Zilairsky District, Bashkortostan, Russia. The population was 226 as of 2010. There are 2 streets.

== Geography ==
Sidorovka is located 66 km east of Zilair (the district's administrative centre) by road. Petropavlovsky is the nearest rural locality.
