= Kadyrsha =

Kadyrsha Кадырша
- Village
- Location within Bashkortostan Location within Russia
- Coordinates: 51°59′N 57°37′E
- Country: Russia
- Region: Bashkortostan
- District: Zilairsky District
- Time zone: UTC+5:00

Kadyrsha (Russian: Кадырша; Bashkir: Ҡаҙырша, Qaźırşa) is a rural locality (a village) in Sabyrovsky Selsoviet, Zilairsky District, Bashkortostan, Russia. The population was 105 as of 2010. There are 2 streets.

== Geography ==
Kadyrsha is located 54 km southeast of Zilair (the district's administrative centre) by road. Ashkadarovo is the nearest rural locality.
