= Kananikolskoye =

Kananikolskoye Кананикольское
- Selo
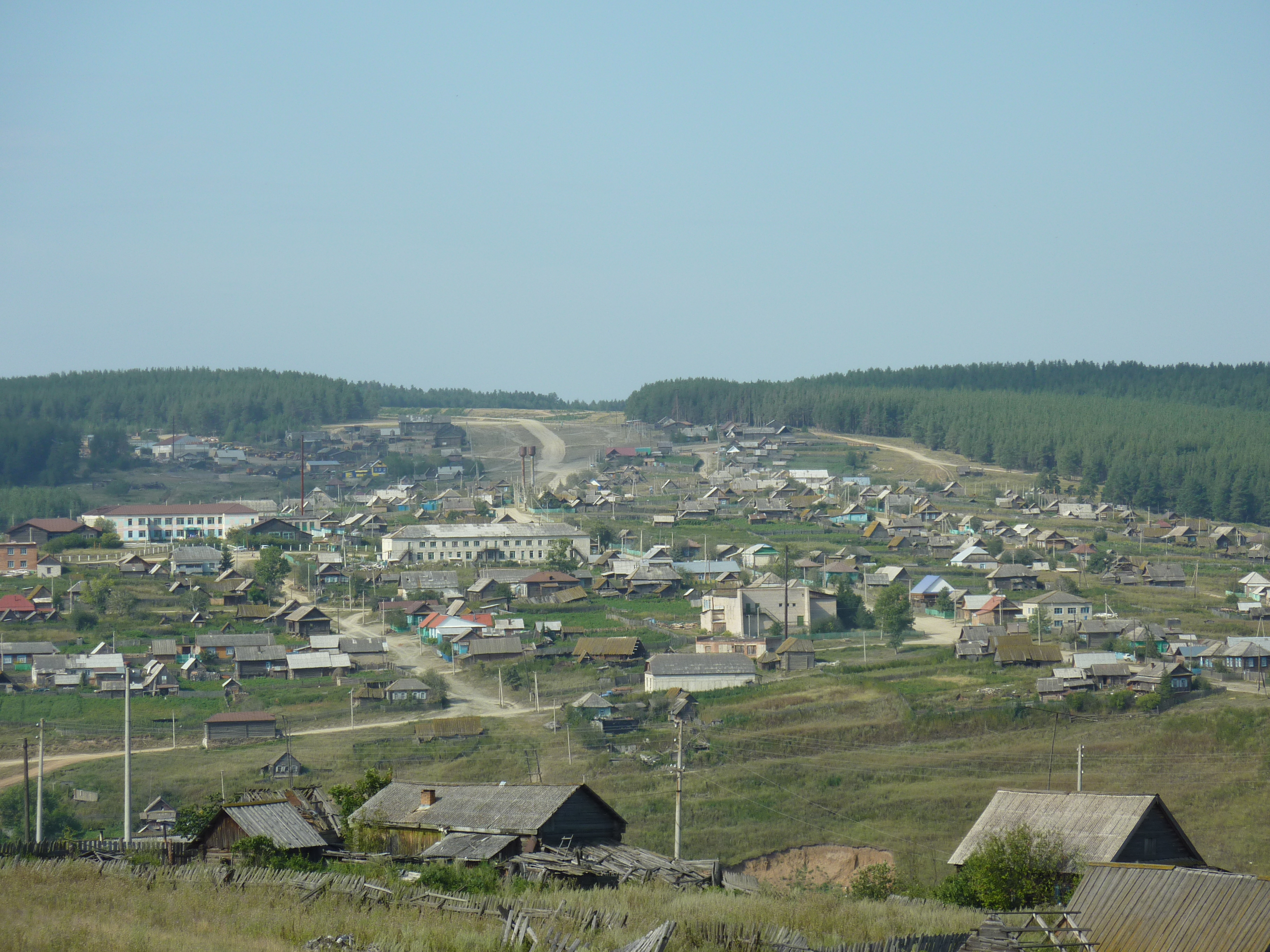

- Location within Bashkortostan Location within Russia
- Coordinates: 52°46′N 57°28′E
- Country: Russia
- Region: Bashkortostan
- District: Zilairsky District
- Time zone: UTC+5:00

Kananikolskoye (Russian: Кананикольское; Bashkir: Ҡананикольский, Qananikolskiy) is a rural locality (a selo) and the administrative centre of Kananikolsky Selsoviet, Zilairsky District, Bashkortostan, Russia. It was founded in 1751 as the Mosolov's (Masalov) copper smelting plant. According to the census of 1762, there was 544 people originally transferred from Tula-Kaluga-Ryazan' region of Russia. The population was 805 as of 2010. There are 40 streets.

== Geography ==
Kananikolskoye is located 77 km north of Zilair (the district's administrative centre) by road. Nadezhdinsky is the nearest rural locality.
