= Shansky =

Shansky Шанский
- Village
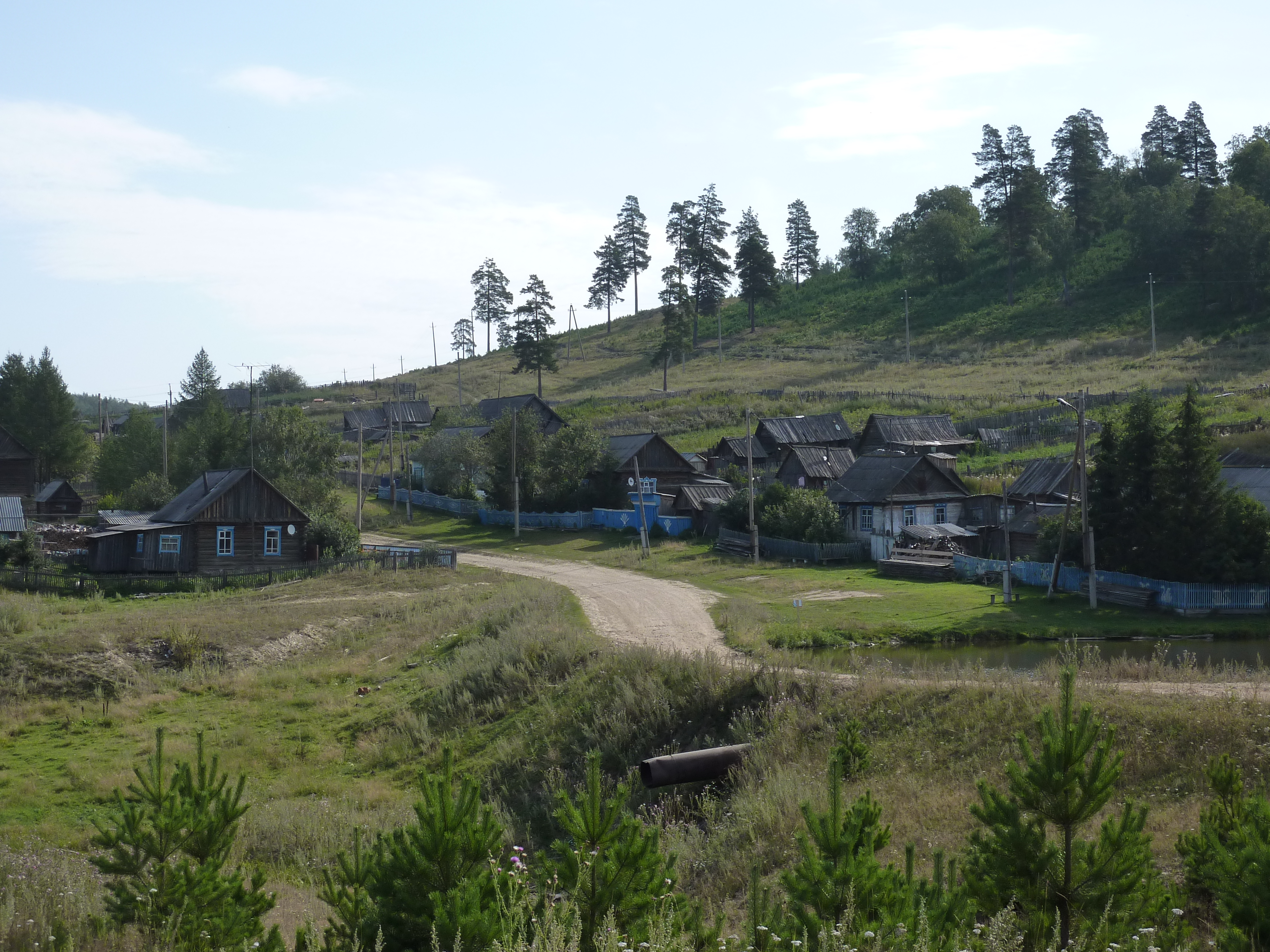

- Location within Bashkortostan Location within Russia
- Coordinates: 52°51′N 57°37′E
- Country: Russia
- Region: Bashkortostan
- District: Zilairsky District
- Time zone: UTC+5:00

Shansky (Russian: Шанский) is a rural locality (a village) in Kananikolsky Selsoviet, Zilairsky District, Bashkortostan, Russia. The population was 203 as of 2010. There are 3 streets.

== Geography ==
Shansky is located 93 km north of Zilair (the district's administrative centre) by road. Kananikolskoye is the nearest rural locality.
