= Yamansaz =

Yamansac Ямансаc
- Selo
- Location within Bashkortostan Location within Russia
- Coordinates: 52°18′N 58°00′E
- Country: Россия
- Region: Bashkortostan
- District: Zilairsky District
- Time zone: UTC+5:00

Yamansaz (Russian: Ямансаз; Bashkir: Яманһаҙ, Yamanhaź) is a rural locality (a selo) and the administrative centre of Yamansazsky Selsoviet, Zilairsky District, Bashkortostan, Russia. The population was 733 as of 2010. There are 8 streets.

== Geography ==
Yamansaz is located 50 km east of Zilair (the district's administrative centre) by road. Matrayevo is the nearest rural locality.
