= Novopreobrazhensky =

Novopreobrazhensky Новопреображенский
- Khutor
- Location within Bashkortostan Location within Russia
- Coordinates: 52°10′N 57°36′E
- Country: Russia
- Region: Bashkortostan
- District: Zilairsky District
- Time zone: UTC+5:00

Novopreobrazhensky (Russian: Новопреображенский) is a rural locality (a khutor) in Zilairsky Selsoviet, Zilairsky District, Bashkortostan, Russia. The population was 23 as of 2010. There are 3 streets.

== Geography ==
Novopreobrazhensky is located 16 km southeast of Zilair (the district's administrative centre) by road. Salyakhovo is the nearest rural locality.
