= Verkhnesalimovo =

Verkhnesalimovo Верхнесалимово
- Village
- Location within Bashkortostan Location within Russia
- Coordinates: 52°12′N 58°01′E
- Country: Russia
- Region: Bashkortostan
- District: Zilairsky District
- Time zone: UTC+5:00

Verkhnesalimovo (Russian: Верхнесалимово; Bashkir: Үрге Сәлим, Ürge Sälim) is a rural locality (a village) in Matrayevsky Selsoviet, Zilairsky District, Bashkortostan, Russia. The population was 174 as of 2010. There are 4 streets.

== Geography ==
Verkhnesalimovo is located 60 km east of Zilair (the district's administrative centre) by road. Balapan is the nearest rural locality.
