= Petrovka, Zilairsky District, Republic of Bashkortostan =

Petrovka Петровка
- Selo
- Location within Bashkortostan Location within Russia
- Coordinates: 52°21′N 57°26′E
- Country: Russia
- Region: Bashkortostan
- District: Zilairsky District
- Time zone: UTC+5:00

Petrovka (Russian: Петровка) is a rural locality (a selo) in Zilairsky Selsoviet, Zilairsky District, Bashkortostan, Russia. The population was 147 as of 2010. There are 6 streets.

== Geography ==
Petrovka is located 16 km north of Zilair (the district's administrative centre) by road. Zilair is the nearest rural locality.
