= Berdyash Russky =

Berdyash Russky Бердяш Русский
- Selo
- Location within Bashkortostan Location within Russia
- Coordinates: 52°33′50″N 57°18′26″E
- Country: Russia
- Region: Bashkortostan
- District: Zilairsky District
- Time zone: UTC+5:00

Berdyash Russky (Russian: Бердяш Русский; Bashkir: Урыҫ Бирҙәше, Urıś Birźäşe) is a rural locality (a selo) in Ivano-Kuvalatsky Selsoviet, Zilairsky District, Bashkortostan, Russia. The population was 13 as of 2010. There is one street.

== Geography ==
Berdyash Russky is located 46 km north of Zilair (the district's administrative centre) by road. Krasny Kushak is the nearest rural locality.
