= Salyakhovo =

Salyakhovo Саляхово
- Village
- Location within Bashkortostan Location within Russia
- Coordinates: 52°11′N 57°41′E
- Country: Russia
- Region: Bashkortostan
- District: Zilairsky District
- Time zone: UTC+5:00

Salyakhovo (Russian: Саляхово; Bashkir: Сәләх, Säläx) is a rural locality (a village) in Kanzafarovsky Selsoviet, Zilairsky District, Bashkortostan, Russia. The population was 161 as of 2010. There are 2 streets.

== Geography ==
Salyakhovo is located 21 km east of Zilair (the district's administrative centre) by road. Yumaguzhino is the nearest rural locality.
