= Izhbuldy =

Izhbuldy Ижбулды
- Village
- Location within Bashkortostan Location within Russia
- Coordinates: 52°18′N 57°45′E
- Country: Russia
- Region: Bashkortostan
- District: Zilairsky District
- Time zone: UTC+5:00

Izhbuldy (Russian: Ижбулды; Bashkir: Ишбулды, İşbuldı) is a rural locality (a village) in Kashkarovsky Selsoviet, Zilairsky District, Bashkortostan, Russia. The population was 77 as of 2010. There is 1 street.

== Geography ==
Izhbuldy is located 36 km northeast of Zilair (the district's administrative centre) by road. Kashkarovo is the nearest rural locality.
