= Staroyakupovo =

Staroyakupovo Староякупово
- Village
- Location within Bashkortostan Location within Russia
- Coordinates: 52°14′N 57°50′E
- Country: Russia
- Region: Bashkortostan
- District: Zilairsky District
- Time zone: UTC+5:00

Staroyakupovo (Russian: Староякупово; Bashkir: Иҫке Яҡуп, İśke Yaqup) is a rural locality (a village) in Matrayevsky Selsoviet, Zilairsky District, Bashkortostan, Russia. The population was 50 as of 2010. There are 3 streets.

== Geography ==
Sultanmirovo is located 68 km east of Zilair (the district's administrative centre) by road. Yaparsaz is the nearest rural locality.
