= Kyzlar-Birgan =

Kyzlar-Birgan Кызлар-Бирган
- Village
- Location within Bashkortostan Location within Russia
- Coordinates: 52°54′N 57°15′E
- Country: Russia
- Region: Bashkortostan
- District: Zilairsky District
- Time zone: UTC+5:00

Kyzlar-Birgan (Russian: Кызлар-Бирган; Bashkir: Ҡыҙҙар-Биргән, Qıźźar-Birgän) is a rural locality (a village) and the administrative centre of Urkassky Selsoviet, Zilairsky District, Bashkortostan, Russia. The population was 350 as of 2010. There are 6 streets.

== Geography ==
Kyzlar-Birgan is located 100 km north of Zilair (the district's administrative centre) by road. Kananikolskoye is the nearest rural locality.
