= Sabyrovo =

Sabyrovo Сабырово
- Selo
- Location within Bashkortostan Location within Russia
- Coordinates: 52°03′N 57°45′E
- Country: Russia
- Region: Bashkortostan
- District: Zilairsky District
- Time zone: UTC+5:00

Sabyrovo (Russian: Сабырово; Bashkir: Һабыр, Habır) is a rural locality (a selo) and the administrative centre of Sabyrovsky Selsoviet, Zilairsky District, Bashkortostan, Russia. The population was 527 as of 2010. There are 8 streets.

== Geography ==
Sabyrovo is located 40 km southeast of Zilair (the district's administrative centre) by road. Salyakhovo is the nearest rural locality.
