= Surtan-Uzyak =

Surtan-Uzyak Суртан-Узяк
- Village
- Location within Bashkortostan Location within Russia
- Coordinates: 52°13′N 58°05′E
- Country: Russia
- Region: Bashkortostan
- District: Zilairsky District
- Time zone: UTC+5:00

Surtan-Uzyak (Russian: Суртан-Узяк; Bashkir: Суртанүҙәк, Surtanüźäk) is a rural locality (a village) in Matrayevsky Selsoviet, Zilairsky District, Bashkortostan, Russia. The population was 59 as of 2010. There are 3 streets.

== Geography ==
Surtan-Uzyak is located 63 km east of Zilair (the district's administrative centre) by road. Balapan is the nearest rural locality.
