= Verkhnegaleyevo =

Verkhnegaleyevo Верхнегалеево
- Village
- Location within Bashkortostan Location within Russia
- Coordinates: 52°08′N 57°51′E
- Country: Russia
- Region: Bashkortostan
- District: Zilairsky District
- Time zone: UTC+5:00

Verkhnegaleyevo (Russian: Верхнегалеево; Bashkir: Үрге Ғәле, Ürge Ğäle) is a rural locality (a village) and the administrative centre of Verkhnegaleyevsky Selsoviet, Zilairsky District, Bashkortostan, Russia. The population was 99 as of 2010. There are 3 streets.

== Geography ==
Verkhnegaleyevo is located 73 km southeast of Zilair (the district's administrative centre) by road. Nizhnegaleyevo is the nearest rural locality.
