= Verkhnyaya Kazarma =

Verkhnyaya Kazarma Верхняя Казарма
- Village
- Location within Bashkortostan Location within Russia
- Coordinates: 52°10′N 57°06′E
- Country: Russia
- Region: Bashkortostan
- District: Zilairsky District
- Time zone: UTC+5:00

Verkhnyaya Kazarma (Russian: Верхняя Казарма; Bashkir: Үрге Ҡаҙарма, Ürge Qaźarma) is a rural locality (a village) in Berdyashsky Selsoviet, Zilairsky District, Bashkortostan, Russia. The population was 12 as of 2010. There is 1 street.

== Geography ==
Verkhnyaya Kazarma is located 28 km southwest of Zilair (the district's administrative centre) by road. Kargala is the nearest rural locality.
