= Kartlazma =

Kartlazma Картлазма
- Khutor
- Location within Bashkortostan Location within Russia
- Coordinates: 52°24′N 57°06′E
- Country: Russia
- Region: Bashkortostan
- District: Zilairsky District
- Time zone: UTC+5:00

Kartlazma (Russian: Картлазма; Bashkir: Ҡартлаҙма, Qartlaźma) is a rural locality (a khutor) in Dmitriyevsky Selsoviet, Zilairsky District, Bashkortostan, Russia. The population was 34 as of 2010. There are 2 streets.

== Geography ==
Kartlazma is located 42 km northwest of Zilair (the district's administrative centre) by road. Chuyunchi-Chulpanovo is the nearest rural locality.
