= Sultantimirovo =

Sultantimirovo Султантимирово
- Village
- Location within Bashkortostan Location within Russia
- Coordinates: 52°18′N 58°08′E
- Country: Russia
- Region: Bashkortostan
- District: Zilairsky District
- Time zone: UTC+5:00

Sultantimirovo (Russian: Султантимирово; Bashkir: Һултантимер, Hultantimer) is a rural locality (a village) in Yamansazsky Selsoviet, Zilairsky District, Bashkortostan, Russia. The population was 250 as of 2010. There are 4 streets.

== Geography ==
Sultantimirovo is located 60 km east of Zilair (the district's administrative centre) by road. Yamansaz is the nearest rural locality.
