= Bikyan =

Bikyan Бикъян
- Village
- Location within Bashkortostan Location within Russia
- Coordinates: 52°06′N 57°55′E
- Country: Russia
- Region: Bashkortostan
- District: Zilairsky District
- Time zone: UTC+5:00

Bikyan (Russian: Бикъян; Bashkir: Бикйән, Bikyän) is a rural locality (a village) in Verkhnegaleyevsky Selsoviet, Zilairsky District, Bashkortostan, Russia. The population was 29 as of 2010. There is 1 street.

== Geography ==
Bikyan is located 7 km east of Zilair (the district's administrative centre) by road.
