= Ashkadarovo =

Ashkadarovo Ашкадарово
- Village
- Location within Bashkortostan Location within Russia
- Coordinates: 52°00′N 57°40′E
- Country: Russia
- Region: Bashkortostan
- District: Zilairsky District
- Time zone: UTC+5:00

Ashkadarovo (Russian: Ашкадарово; Bashkir: Ашҡаҙар, Aşqaźar) is a rural locality (a village) in Sabyrovsky Selsoviet, Zilairsky District, Bashkortostan, Russia. The population was 169 as of 2010. There are 3 streets.

== Geography ==
Ashkadarovo is located 48 km (30 mi) southeast of Zilair (the district's administrative centre) by road. Kadyrsha is the nearest rural locality.
