= Talikha =

Talikha Талиха
- Khutor
- Location within Bashkortostan Location within Russia
- Coordinates: 52°19′N 57°15′E
- Country: Russia
- Region: Bashkortostan
- District: Zilairsky District
- Time zone: UTC+5:00

Talikha (Russian: Талиха) is a rural locality (a khutor) in Zilairsky Selsoviet, Zilairsky District, Bashkortostan, Russia. The population was 9 as of 2010. There is 1 street.

== Geography ==
Talikha is located 19 km northwest of Zilair (the district's administrative centre) by road. Saratovsky is the nearest rural locality.
