= Yumaguzhino =

Yumaguzhino Юмагужино
- Village
- Location within Bashkortostan Location within Russia
- Coordinates: 52°12′N 57°45′E
- Country: Russia
- Region: Bashkortostan
- District: Zilairsky District
- Time zone: UTC+5:00

Yumaguzhino (Russian: Юмагужино; Bashkir: Йомағужа, Yomağuja) is a rural locality (a village) and the administrative centre of Kanzafarovsky Selsoviet, Zilairsky District, Bashkortostan, Russia. The population was 380 as of 2010. There are 5 streets.

== Geography ==
Yumaguzhino is located 26 km east of Zilair (the district's administrative centre) by road. Novoyakupovo is the nearest rural locality.
