= Muchetbar =

Muchetbar Мучетьбар
- Khutor
- Location within Bashkortostan Location within Russia
- Coordinates: 52°27′N 57°10′E
- Country: Russia
- Region: Bashkortostan
- District: Zilairsky District
- Time zone: UTC+5:00

Muchetbar (Russian: Мучетьбар; Bashkir: Мәсетбәр, Mäsetbär) is a rural locality (a khutor) in Dmitriyevsky Selsoviet, Zilairsky District, Bashkortostan, Russia. The population was 70 as of 2010. There is 1 street.

== Geography ==
Muchetbar is located 37 km northwest of Zilair (the district's administrative centre) by road. Novopokrovsky is the nearest rural locality.
