= Yaparsaz =

Yaparsaz Япарсаз
- Village
- Location within Bashkortostan Location within Russia
- Coordinates: 52°14′N 57°56′E
- Country: Russia
- Region: Bashkortostan
- District: Zilairsky District
- Time zone: UTC+5:00

Yaparsaz (Russian: Япарсаз; Bashkir: Япарһаҙ, Yaparhaź) is a rural locality (a village) in Matrayevsky Selsoviet, Zilairsky District, Bashkortostan, Russia. The population was 236 as of 2010. There are 5 streets.

== Geography ==
Yaparsaz is located 61 km east of Zilair (the district's administrative centre) by road. Matrayevo is the nearest rural locality.
