= Vladimiro-Nikolayevsky =

Vladimiro-Nikolayevsky Владимиро-Николаевский
- Khutor
- Location within Bashkortostan Location within Russia
- Coordinates: 52°05′N 57°34′E
- Country: Russia
- Region: Bashkortostan
- District: Zilairsky District
- Time zone: UTC+5:00

Vladimiro-Nikolayevsky (Russian: Владимиро-Николаевский) is a rural locality (a khutor) in Zilairsky Selsoviet, Zilairsky District, Bashkortostan, Russia. The population was 27 as of 2010. There are 3 streets.

== Geography ==
Vladimiro-Nikolayevsky is located 24 km southeast of Zilair (the district's administrative centre) by road. Vasilyevka is the nearest rural locality.
