= Kamysh-Uzyak =

Kamysh-Uzyak Камыш-Узяк
- Village
- Location within Bashkortostan Location within Russia
- Coordinates: 52°12′N 57°54′E
- Country: Russia
- Region: Bashkortostan
- District: Zilairsky District
- Time zone: UTC+5:00

Kamysh-Uzyak (Russian: Камыш-Узяк; Bashkir: Ҡамышүҙәк, Qamışüźäk) is a rural locality (a village) in Matrayevsky Selsoviet, Zilairsky District, Bashkortostan, Russia. The population was 3 as of 2010. There is 1 street.

== Geography ==
Kamysh-Uzyak is located 69 km east of Zilair (the district's administrative centre) by road. Staroyakupovo is the nearest rural locality.
