= Matrayevo =

Matrayevo Матраево
- Selo
- Location within Bashkortostan Location within Russia
- Coordinates: 52°15′N 58°01′E
- Country: Russia
- Region: Bashkortostan
- District: Zilairsky District
- Time zone: UTC+5:00

Matrayevo (Russian: Матраево; Bashkir: Матрай, Matray) is a rural locality (a selo) and the administrative centre of Matrayevsky Selsoviet, Zilairsky District, Bashkortostan, Russia. The population was 940 as of 2010. There are 12 streets.

== Geography ==
Matrayevo is located 55 km east of Zilair (the district's administrative centre) by road. Balapan is the nearest rural locality.
