= Krasny Kushak =

Krasny Kushak Красный Кушак
- Khutor
- Location within Bashkortostan Location within Russia
- Coordinates: 52°30′N 57°25′E
- Country: Russia
- Region: Bashkortostan
- District: Zilairsky District
- Time zone: UTC+5:00

Krasny Kushak (Russian: Красный Кушак; Bashkir: Ҡыҙыл Ҡушаҡ, Qıźıl Quşaq) is a rural locality (a khutor) in Ivano-Kuvalatsky Selsoviet, Zilairsky District, Bashkortostan, Russia. The population was 10 as of 2010. There are 2 streets.

== Geography ==
Krasny Kushak is located 34 km north of Zilair (the district's administrative centre) by road. Berdyash Russky is the nearest rural locality.
