= Nizhnegaleyevo =

Nizhnegaleyevo Нижнегалеево
- Village
- Location within Bashkortostan Location within Russia
- Coordinates: 52°08′N 57°49′E
- Country: Russia
- Region: Bashkortostan
- District: Zilairsky District
- Time zone: UTC+5:00

Nizhnegaleyevo (Russian: Нижнегалеево; Bashkir: Түбәнге Ғәле, Tübänge Ğäle) is a rural locality (a village) in Verkhnegaleyevsky Selsoviet, Zilairsky District, Bashkortostan, Russia. The population was 2 as of 2010. There is 1 street.

== Geography ==
Nizhnegaleyevo is located 73 km east of Zilair (the district's administrative centre) by road. Verkhnegaleyevo is the nearest rural locality.
