= Iskuzhino, Zilairsky District, Republic of Bashkortostan =

Iskuzhino Искужино
- Village
- Location within Bashkortostan Location within Russia
- Coordinates: 52°21′N 57°45′E
- Country: Russia
- Region: Bashkortostan
- District: Zilairsky District
- Time zone: UTC+5:00

Iskuzhino (Russian: Искужино; Bashkir: Исҡужа, İsquja) is a rural locality (a village) in Kashkarovsky Selsoviet, Zilairsky District, Bashkortostan, Russia. The population was 183 as of 2010. There are 3 streets.

== Geography ==
Iskuzhino is located 30 km northeast of Zilair (the district's administrative centre) by road. Kashkarovo is the nearest rural locality.
