= Kashkarovo =

Kashkarovo Кашкарово
- Village
- Location within Bashkortostan Location within Russia
- Coordinates: 52°20′N 57°45′E
- Country: Russia
- Region: Bashkortostan
- District: Zilairsky District
- Time zone: UTC+5:00

Kashkarovo (Russian: Кашкарово; Bashkir: Ҡашҡар, Qaşqar) is a rural locality (a selo) and the administrative centre of Kashkarovsky Selsoviet, Zilairsky District, Bashkortostan, Russia. The population was 416 as of 2010. There are 8 streets.

== Geography ==
Kashkarovo is located 30 km northeast of Zilair (the district's administrative centre) by road. Ishkuzhino is the nearest rural locality.
