= Lacchini (crater) =

Crater on the Moon

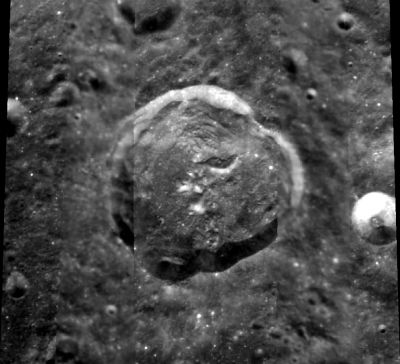
- Clementine mosaic
- Coordinates: 41.29°N 107.83°W
- Diameter: 57.95 km (36.01 mi)
- Depth: Unknown
- Colongitude: 108° at sunrise
- Eponym: Giovanni Lacchini

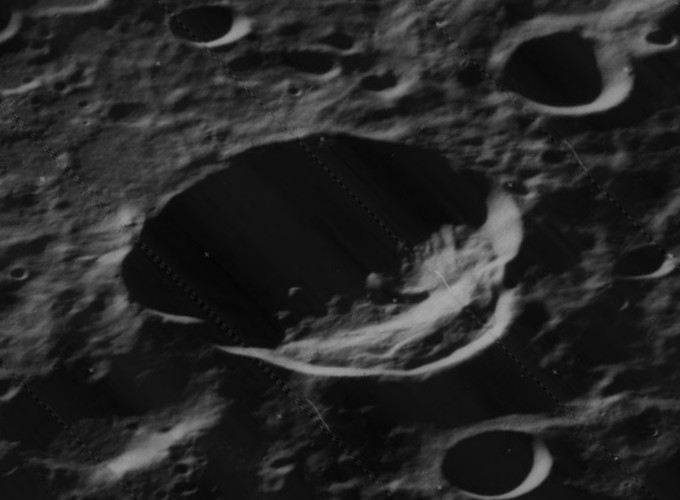
Oblique Lunar Orbiter 5 image, facing west

Lacchini is an impact crater on the far side of the Moon. It is located in the northern hemisphere, just behind the northwestern limb of the visible Moon. This part of the lunar surface can sometimes be viewed under favorable conditions of libration and illumination, but at such times the crater is only seen from the edge.

Less than one crater diameter to the east is the larger crater Bragg. To the north is Stefan, and farther to the southeast is a walled plain named Lorentz. Due west of Laccini is Landau, another walled plain.

The outer rim of Lacchini is roughly circular, with outward bulges to the south and east. The edge is sharp and not significantly eroded. The inner walls have slumped around much of the circumference, forming an irregular ring of talus about the interior floor. There are some low ridges near the midpoint and in the eastern half of the floor. The infrared spectrum of pure crystalline plagioclase has been identified on the central peak and southern part of the crater.

Prior to formal naming by the IAU in 1970, Lacchini was called Crater 101.

== See also ==
- Asteroid 145962 Lacchini
