= Maloyuldybayevo =

Maloyuldybayevo Малоюлдыбаево
- Village
- Location within Bashkortostan Location within Russia
- Coordinates: 52°19′N 57°50′E
- Country: Russia
- Region: Bashkortostan
- District: Zilairsky District
- Time zone: UTC+5:00

Maloyuldybayevo (Russian: Малоюлдыбаево; Bashkir: Бәләкәй Юлдыбай, Bäläkäy Yuldıbay) is a rural locality (a village) in Yuldybayevsky Selsoviet, Zilairsky District, Bashkortostan, Russia. The population was 208 as of 2010. There are 3 streets.

== Geography ==
Maloyuldybayevo is located 42 km northeast of Zilair (the district's administrative centre) by road. Yuldybayevo is the nearest rural locality.
