= Bragg (crater) =

Crater on the Moon

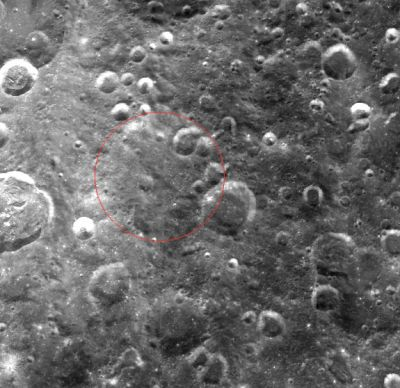
- Clementine mosaic
- Coordinates: 42.33°N 103.44°W
- Diameter: 77.21 km (47.98 mi)
- Depth: Unknown
- Colongitude: 104° at sunrise
- Formation: Pre-Nectarian
- Eponym: William H. Bragg

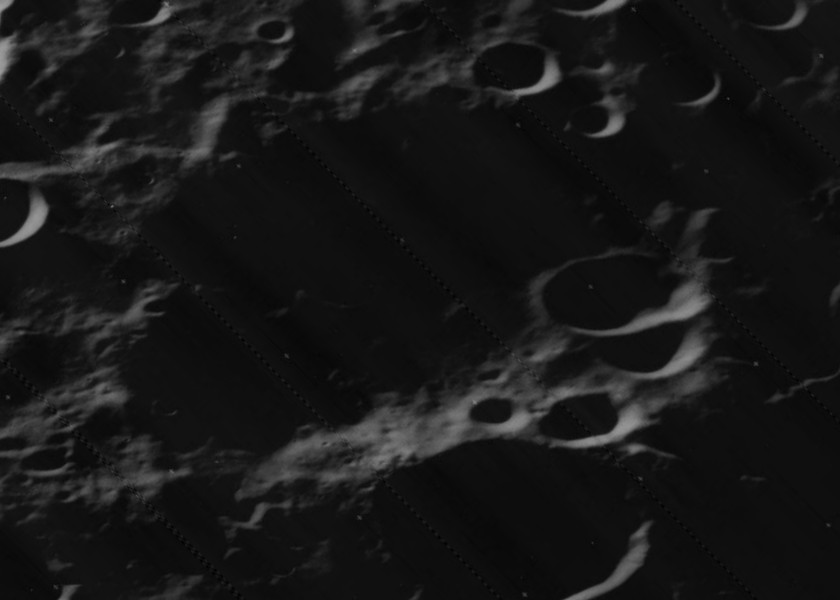
Oblique Lunar Orbiter 5 image, facing west

Bragg is an ancient lunar impact crater that is located on the far side of the Moon, just beyond the northwest limb. It dates to the Pre-Nectarian period of the lunar geologic timescale. This formation has been heavily eroded and reshaped by subsequent impacts, leaving an irregular depression in the surface. The most intact portion of the rim is along the western face, while the northern and eastern rim has been nearly worn away and is overlaid by several smaller craters. The most notable of these is Bragg H, which lies across the east-southeastern rim.

This crater is located to the north-northwest of a walled plain called Lorentz. Nearby craters of note include Rynin to the north, Stefan to the northwest, Lacchini to the west, and Avicenna to the southeast. The region about this crater is very rugged and marked by many smaller impacts.

This crater is named after English-Australian physicist William H. Bragg (1862–1942), a 1915 Nobel laureate in physics for his important work on X-ray crystallography. Prior to its designation being formally adopted by the IAU in 1970, Bragg was identified as Crater 102.

== Satellite craters ==
By convention these features are identified on lunar maps by placing the letter on the side of the crater midpoint that is closest to Bragg.

Bragg	Latitude	Longitude	Diameter
H	41.7° N	101.0° W	40 km
M	39.1° N	102.5° W	45 km
P	40.0° N	104.4° W	30 km
