= Voskresensky District =

Administrative and municipal district name

Location of Moscow Oblast in Russia

Location of Nizhny Novgorod Oblast in Russia

Location of Saratov Oblast in Russia

Voskresensky District is the name of several administrative and municipal districts in Russia. The name is generally derived from or related to the root "voskreseniye" (resurrection).

- Voskresensky District, Moscow Oblast, an administrative and municipal district of Moscow Oblast
- Voskresensky District, Nizhny Novgorod Oblast, an administrative and municipal district of Nizhny Novgorod Oblast
- Voskresensky District, Saratov Oblast, an administrative and municipal district of Saratov Oblast

== See also ==
- Voskresensky (disambiguation)
- Voskresensk
