= Voskresenskoye, Zilairsky District, Republic of Bashkortostan =

Voskresenskoye Воскресенское
- Selo
- Location within Bashkortostan Location within Russia
- Coordinates: 52°22′N 57°59′E
- Country: Russia
- Region: Bashkortostan
- District: Zilairsky District
- Time zone: UTC+5:00

Voskresenskoye (Russian: Воскресенское) is a rural locality (a selo) in Yuldybayevsky Selsoviet, Zilairsky District, Bashkortostan, Russia. The population was 159 as of 2010. There are 3 streets.

== Geography ==
Voskresenskoye is located 50 km northeast of Zilair (the district's administrative centre) by road. Yuldybayevo is the nearest rural locality.
