= Avicenna (crater) =

Lunar impact crater

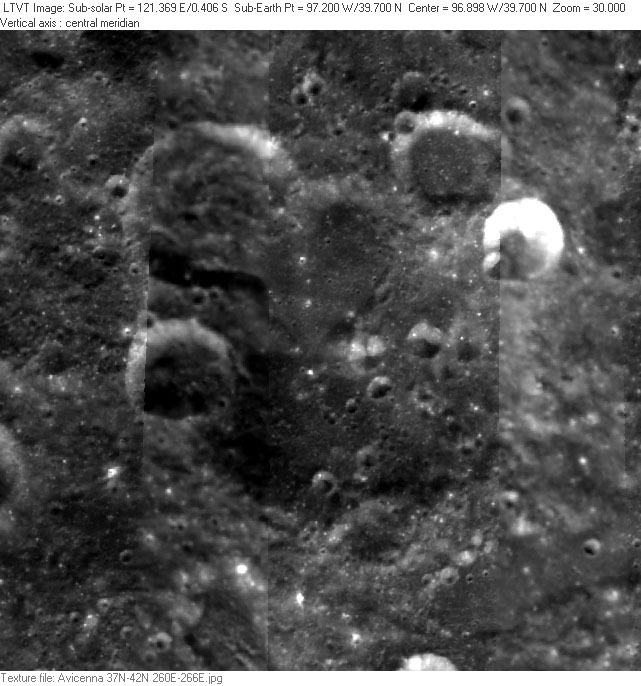
- Clementine mosaic
- Coordinates: 39.63°N 97.28°W
- Diameter: 72.99 km (45.35 mi)
- Depth: Unknown
- Colongitude: 98° at sunrise
- Formation: Pre-Nectarian
- Eponym: Avicenna

Avicenna is a lunar impact crater that lies on the far side of the Moon, just beyond the western limb on the northern rim of the Lorentz basin. It lies to the north-northwest of the larger crater Nernst, and to the southeast of Bragg.

This formation dates to the Pre-Nectarian period on the lunar geologic timescale. Much of the northern half of Avicenna has been obliterated by subsequent, overlapping impacts. The southern and southeastern rim is worn and eroded, but the outline can still be discerned. There is a small crater lying across the southern rim, although this formation is equally worn. Several small craters lie across the southern extent of Avicenna's floor.

This crater is named after Persian physician Ibn Sina (980–1037), known in the West as Avicenna. Prior to formal naming by the IAU in 1970, Avicenna was called Crater 180.

== Satellite craters ==
By convention these features are identified on lunar maps by placing the letter on the side of the crater midpoint that is closest to Avicenna.

Avicenna	Latitude	Longitude	Diameter
E	40.0° N	91.1° W	25 km
G	39.0° N	92.0° W	26 km
R	38.9° N	100.1° W	21 km
