= Voskresenovka, Jewish Autonomous Oblast =

Voskresenovka Воскресеновка
- Selo
- Location within Jewish Autonomous Oblast Location within Russia
- Coordinates: 48°02′N 132°52′E
- Country: Russia
- Region: Jewish Autonomous Oblast
- District: Leninsky District
- Time zone: UTC+10:00

Voskresenovka (Russian: Воскресеновка) is a rural locality (a selo) in Leninsky District, Jewish Autonomous Oblast, Russia. Population: 338 (2010 census); 373 (2002 census); There are 6 streets in this selo.

== Geography ==
This rural locality is located 23 km from Leninskoye (the district's administrative centre), 84 km from Birobidzhan (capital of Jewish Autonomous Oblast) and 7,134 km from Moscow. Churki is the nearest rural locality.
