= Laue (crater) =

Crater on the Moon

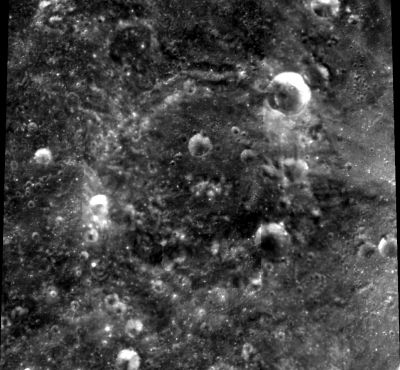
- Clementine image
- Coordinates: 28.29°N 97.05°W
- Diameter: 89.17 km (55.41 mi)
- Depth: Unknown
- Colongitude: 98° at sunrise
- Formation: Imbrian
- Eponym: Max von Laue

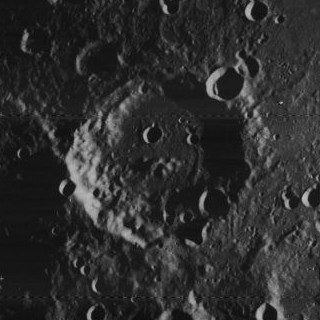
Lunar Orbiter 4 image

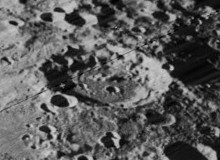
Oblique view facing south

Laue is a lunar impact crater that lies across the south-southwestern rim and interior floor of the huge walled plain named Lorentz. This feature is located on the Moon's far side, just beyond the west-northwestern limb. Under conditions of favorable libration and illumination from the Sun, this area can be seen at a very oblique angle from the Earth.

This formation dates to the Imbrian period on the lunar geologic timescale. It is a moderately worn crater formation with several small craters along the rim. The largest of these is a small crater that intrudes slightly into the northeastern rim. A cup-shaped crater lies along the east-southeastern inner wall. The interior wall is generally less wide along the northern side than elsewhere, which may have been the result of the terrain in which the impact was formed. The infrared spectrum of pure crystalline plagioclase has been identified on the northeastern rim.

There is a pair of low central ridges offset just to the south of the crater midpoint. A small, cup-shaped crater lies within the interior floor to the north-northwest of the center. The remainder of the floor is relatively level, but is marked by a number of small craters.

This crater is named after German physicist Max von Laue (1879–1960), who received the Nobel Prize in Physics in 1914 "for his discovery of the diffraction of X-rays by crystals." Prior to formal naming by the International Astronomical Union in 1970, Laue was called Crater 181.

== Satellite craters ==
By convention these features are identified on lunar maps by placing the letter on the side of the crater midpoint that is closest to Laue.

Laue	Latitude	Longitude	Diameter
G	27.8° N	93.2° W	36 km
U	28.8° N	101.4° W	56 km
