= Aston (crater) =

Crater on the Moon

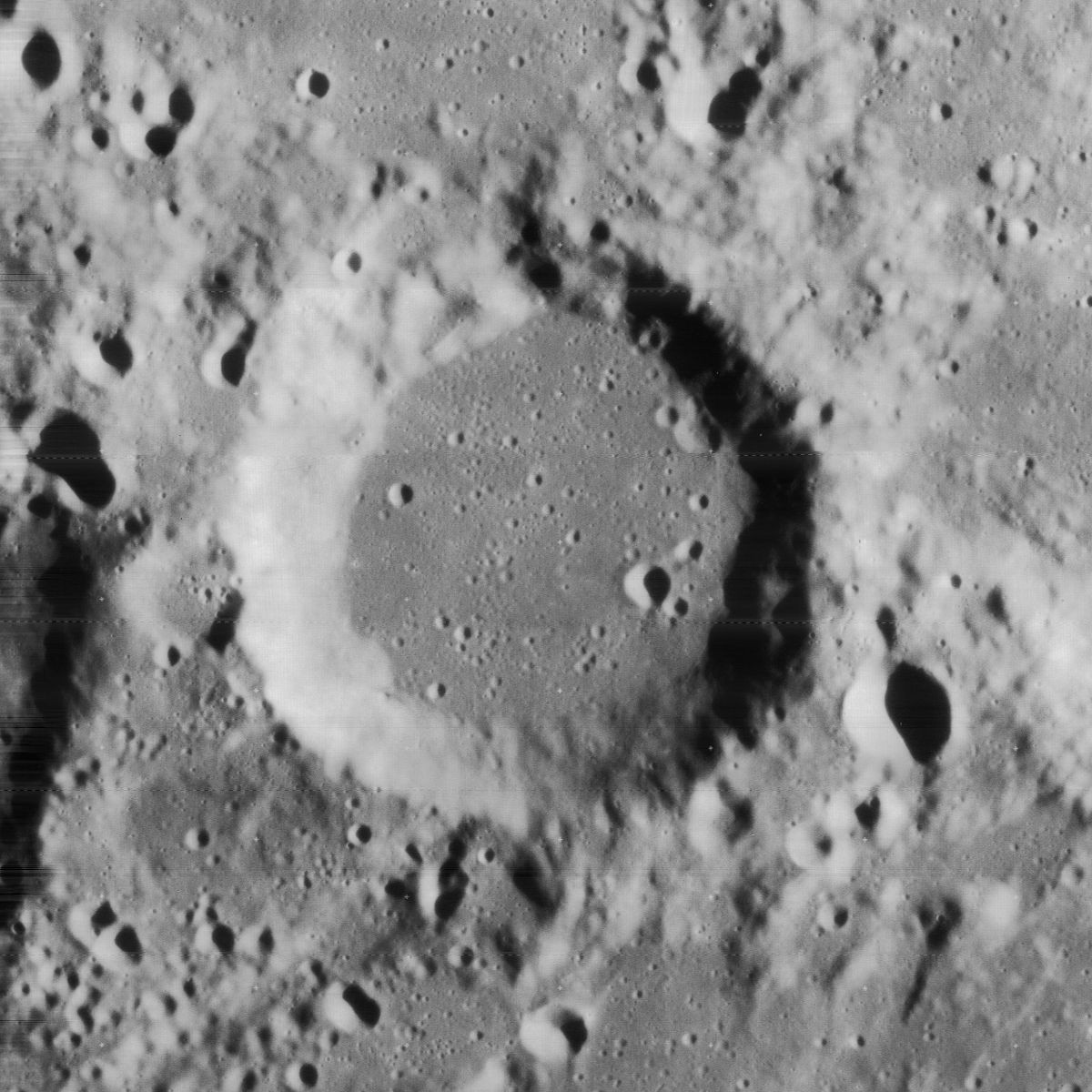
- Lunar Orbiter 4 image
- Coordinates: 32.9°N 87.7°W
- Diameter: 44.48 km (27.64 mi)
- Depth: Unknown
- Colongitude: 254° at sunrise
- Eponym: Francis W. Aston

Aston is a lunar impact crater that is located along the northwest limb of the Moon. Because of its location the crater is seen nearly from on edge, and visibility is subject to libration. It lies to the east of the crater Röntgen, some distance due west of Ulugh Beigh on the edge of the Oceanus Procellarum. To the south is the crater Voskresenskiy.

The rim of Aston has been worn down and rounded due to subsequent impacts. It forms a circular shape that has not been significantly altered by nearby impacts. The interior floor is relatively flat and featureless, with no central peak of significance. The region between Aston and Voskresenskiy has mare-like properties intermixed with ejecta from the Imbrian impact.

This crater is named after scientist Francis William Aston (1877-1945). The name was incorporated into lunar nomenclature with the Rectified Lunar Atlas in 1963. Its designation was formally adopted by the International Astronomical Union in 1964. Aston invented the mass spectrometer and used it to discover many of the stable isotopes. For his discoveries, he was awarded the 1922 Nobel Prize in Chemistry. He was a keen amateur astronomer with a particular interest in solar eclipses.

== Satellite craters ==
By convention these features are identified on lunar maps by placing the letter on the side of the crater midpoint that is closest to Aston.

Aston	Latitude	Longitude	Diameter
K	35.1° N	87.8° W	14 km
L	35.5° N	86.5° W	10 km
