= Röntgen (crater) =

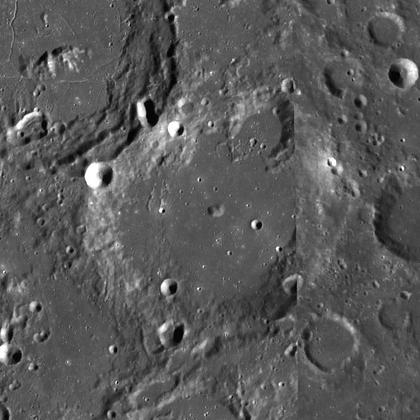
- LRO mosaic
- Coordinates: 32.88°N 91.42°W
- Diameter: 128.42 km (79.80 mi)
- Depth: Unknown
- Colongitude: 94° at sunrise
- Eponym: Wilhelm C. Röntgen

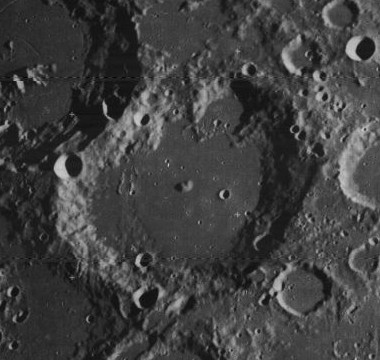
Lunar Orbiter 4 image

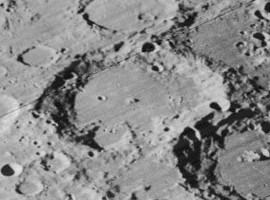
Another Lunar Orbiter 4 image, facing south

Röntgen is a relatively large lunar impact crater that lies along the northwestern limb of the Moon. Its northwestern outer rim is partly overlain by the crater Nernst. Both Nernst and Röntgen overlie the eastern rim of the much larger Lorentz, a walled plain. The smaller crater Aston is separated from the eastern edge of Röntgen by only a few kilometers of terrain. To the south-southeast is Voskresenskiy.

The outer rim of Röntgen has been heavily eroded by subsequent impacts, and it now forms an uneven, jumbled ring of ridges in the surface. There is a relatively fresh, cup-shaped crater along the common rim between Röntgen and Nernst. The infrared spectrum of pure crystalline plagioclase has been identified on the northwest rim. The interior floor of Röntgen is nearly level, with only a few patches of uneven terrain near the edges and a low ridge near the midpoint. The surface of the floor is marked by a few small and several tiny craterlets.

This crater is named after German physicist and 1901 Nobel laureate Wilhelm C. Röntgen (1845–1923). Prior to its designation being formally adopted by the International Astronomical Union in 1964, Röntgen was called Crater 184. A crater south of Röntgen that is currently unnamed was called Crater 185.

== Satellite craters ==
By convention these features are identified on lunar maps by placing the letter on the side of the crater midpoint that is closest to Röntgen.

Röntgen	Latitude	Longitude	Diameter
A	36.9° N	88.1° W	18 km
B	35.7° N	88.1° W	16 km
