= Voskresenovka =

Voskresenovka (Russian: Воскресе́новка) is the name of several rural localities in Russia:

- Voskresenovka, Bryansk Oblast, a village in Bryansk Oblast
- Voskresenovka, Jewish Autonomous Oblast, a selo in the Jewish Autonomous Oblast
- Voskresenovka, Kursky District, Kursk Oblast, a village in Kursk Oblast
- Voskresenovka (station), Mikhaylovsky District, Amur Oblast, station in the Mikhaylovsky District of Amur Oblast, Russia
