= Churki =

Churki Чурки
- Selo
- Location within Jewish Autonomous Oblast Location within Russia
- Coordinates: 48°04′N 132°39′E
- Country: Russia
- Region: Jewish Autonomous Oblast
- District: Leninsky District
- Time zone: UTC+10:00

Churki (Russian: Чурки) is a rural locality (a selo) in Leninsky District, Jewish Autonomous Oblast, Russia. Population: 159 (2010 census); 178 (2002 census); There are 6 streets in this selo.

== Geography ==
This rural locality is located 16 km from Leninskoye (the district's administrative centre), 82 km from Birobidzhan (capital of Jewish Autonomous Oblast) and 7,113 km from Moscow. Kalinino is the nearest rural locality.
