= Voskresenskoye, Saratov Oblast =

Rural locality in Saratov Oblast, Russia

Voskresenskoye, Saratov Oblast Воскресенское
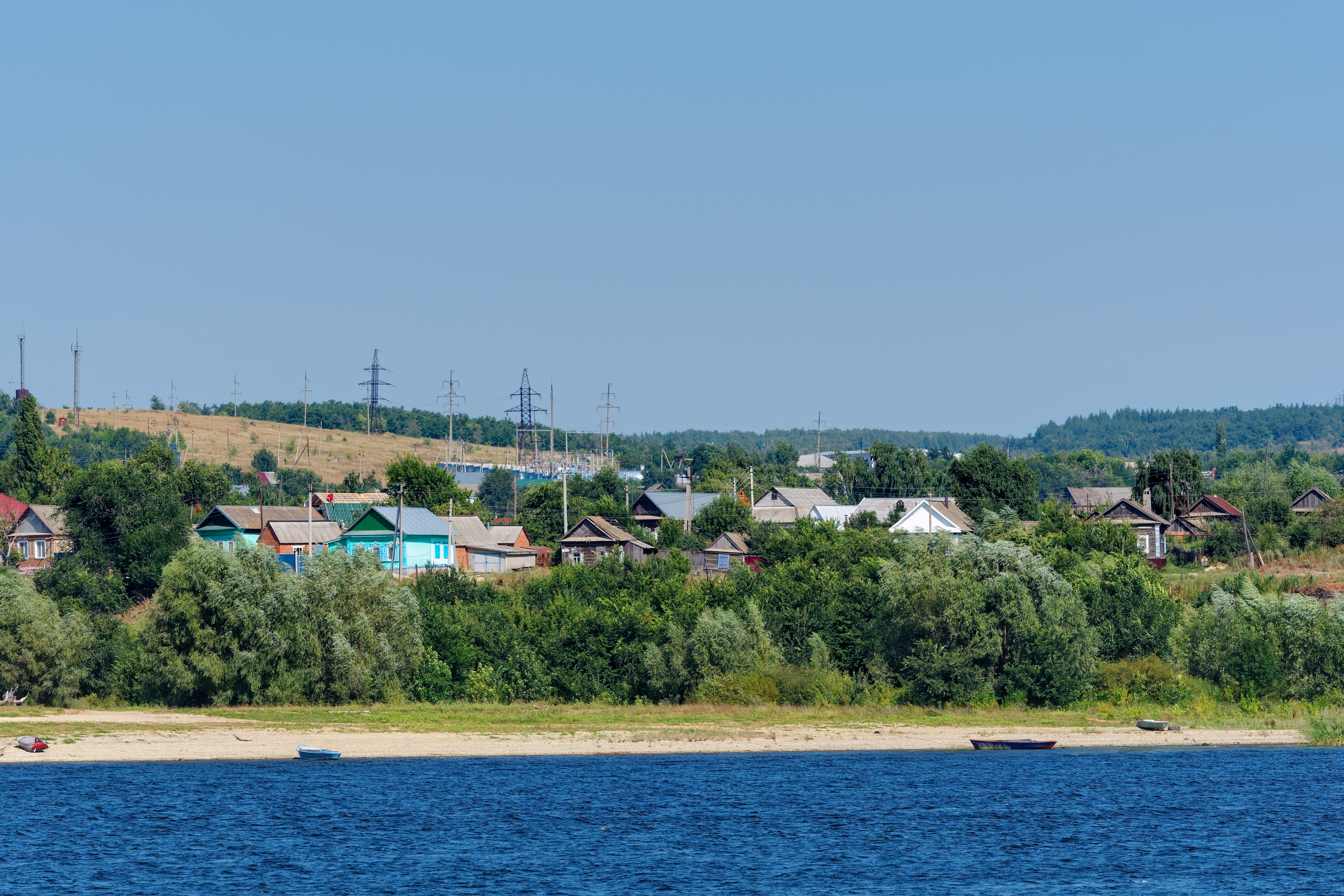
- Volga River. Voskresenskoye
- Interactive map of Voskresenskoye, Saratov Oblast
- Location of Voskresenskoye, Saratov Oblast Voskresenskoye, Saratov Oblast (Russia)
- Coordinates: 51°49′28″N 46°56′06″E
- Country: Russia
- Federal subject: Saratov Oblast

Population (2010 Census)
  - Total: 3,309
  - Estimate (2021): 3,014 (−8.9%)
- Time zone: UTC+4 (MSK+1)
- Postal code: 413030
- OKTMO ID: 63612408101

Voskresenskoye (Russian: Воскресе́нское) is a rural locality (a selo) and the administrative center of Voskresensky District, Saratov Oblast, Russia. Population: 3,309 (2010 census); 3,235 (2002 census); 3,263 (1989 Soviet census).

== History ==
The village of Voskresenskoye in the Saratov region has a history dating back to the 16th century. The first settlement on the territory of modern-day Voskresenskoye was founded by a group of participants in an expedition led by the merchant Nikonov. The settlement was established on the banks of the Volga River, near the ravines of Zmeyova Gora, and was given an official name in 1580.

In the late 17th century, the Resurrection Monastery in the Moscow district acquired a "wild field" in the southeastern outskirts of the Moscow state, including the area where Voskresenskoye was located. This area was settled by peasants, criminals, and schismatics who fled from persecution. With time, Voskresenskoye became inhabited by peasants transferred from the old estates of the Resurrection Monastery, and the village had an Orthodox church built on its banks.

In the 18th century, the inhabitants of Voskresenskoye belonged to the economic department and were considered economic peasants. By the 19th century, the villagers had become state-owned peasants, state-owned and burghers. In the 1890s, the village was described as one of the best on the Volga River, with wooden houses covered with plank roofs, brick houses with iron roofs, a bazaar, a parish stone church, grocers, a tavern, and windmills. The residents of Voskresenskoye were engaged in various occupations, including agriculture, shoemaking, tailoring, carpentry, trade, fishing, and transport. They were known for their cleanliness and neatness, and their lifestyle and development were more urban than rural.

== Infrastructure ==
The village of Voskresensky District in Russia has a range of amenities and services, including:

- General education school
- Children's art school
- Central district hospital
- District House of Culture
- Kindergartens
- Post office
- Branch of Sberbank

=== Attractions ===
The village has a number of notable attractions, including:

- Holy Trinity Church
- Memorial to those who died during the Great Patriotic War
- Wall of memory to the fallen of the Soviet Union, natives of the Voskresensky district
- Monument to countrymen who died in local wars

=== Mass media ===
The official newspaper of the Voskresensky District administration is "Nasha Zhizn." It has a circulation of 1500 copies and is published once a week, with its own website.
