= Voskresenskoye, Ilyinsky District, Ivanovo Oblast =

Voskresenskoye Воскресенское
- Selo
- Location within Ivanovo Oblast Location within Russia
- Coordinates: 56°55′N 39°53′E
- Country: Russia
- Region: Ivanovo Oblast
- District: Ilyinsky District
- Time zone: UTC+3:00

Voskresenskoye (Russian: Воскресенское) is a rural locality (a selo) in Ilyinsky District, Ivanovo Oblast, Russia. Population: 8 (2010 census);

== Geography ==
This rural locality is located 9 kilometres (5.6 mi) from Ilyinskoye-Khovanskoye (the district's administrative centre), 66 kilometres (41 mi) from Ivanovo (capital of Ivanovo Oblast) and 189 kilometres (117 mi) from Moscow. Kochki Bolshiye is the nearest rural locality.
