= Voskresenskiy (crater) =

Lunar impact crater

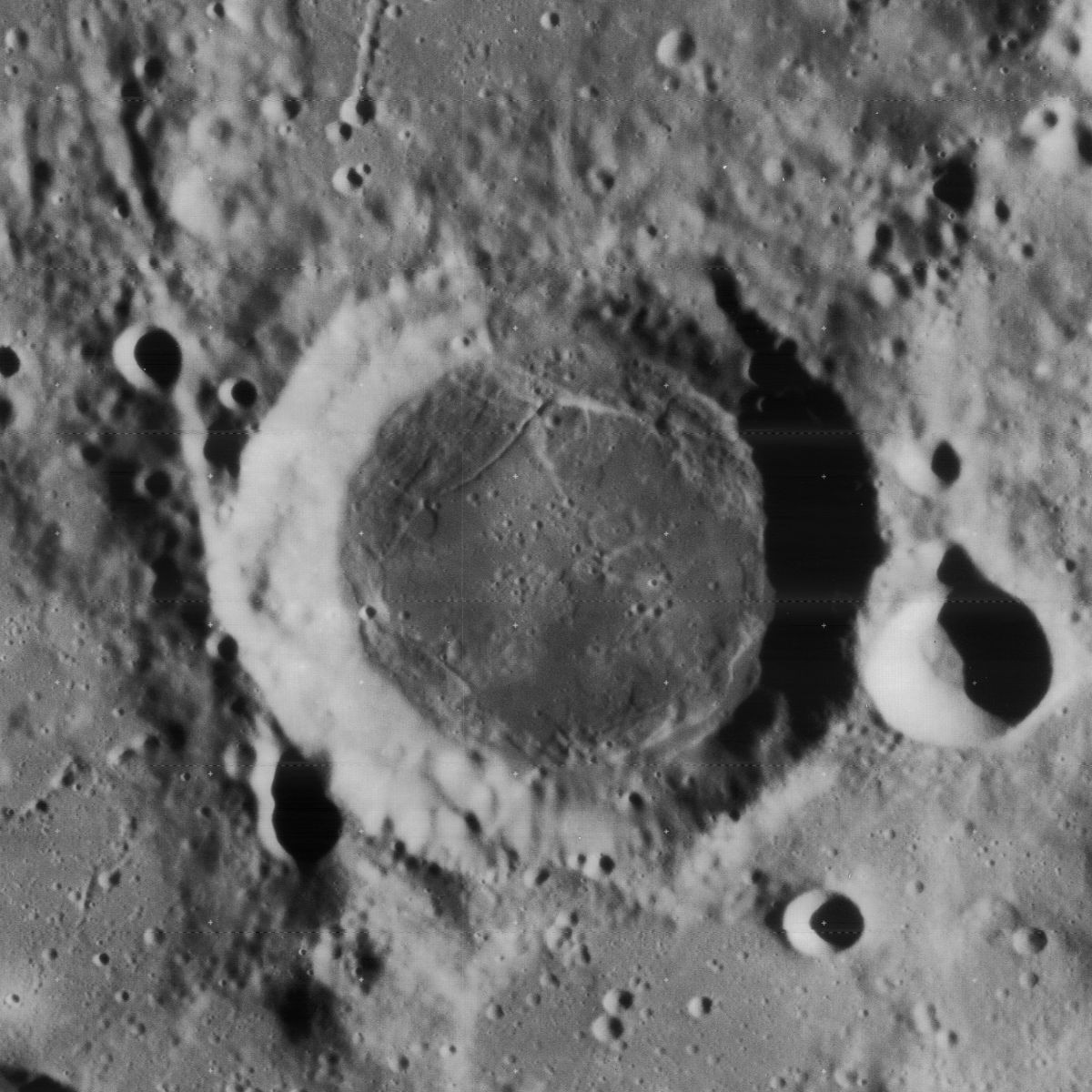
- Lunar Orbiter 4 image
- Coordinates: 28.0°N 88.1°W
- Diameter: 50 km
- Depth: Unknown
- Colongitude: 89° at sunrise
- Eponym: Leonid A. Voskresenskiy

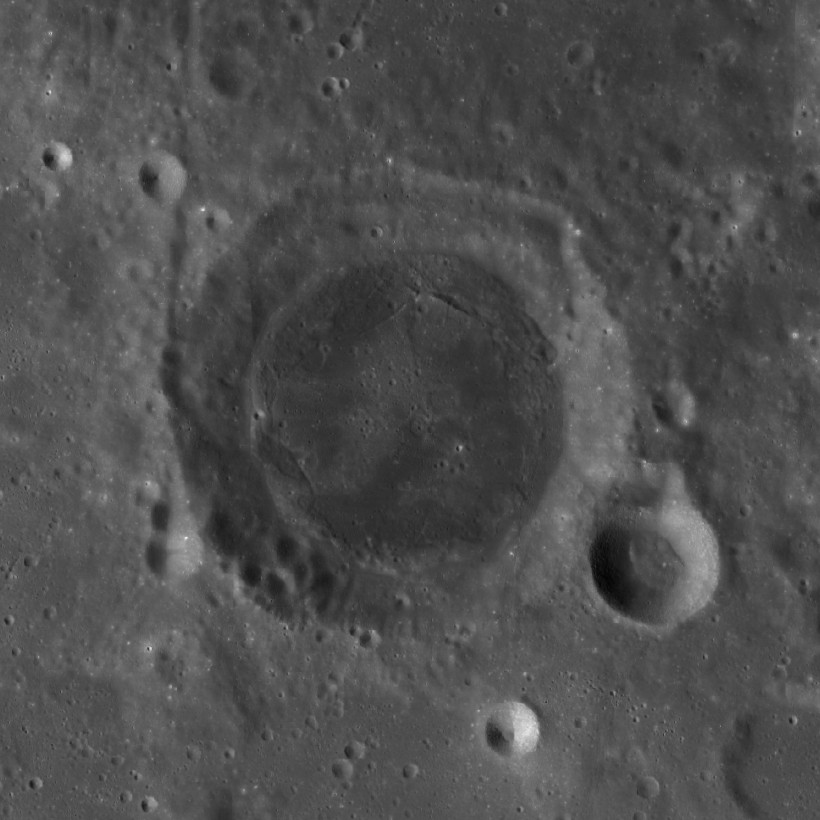
LRO mosaic

Voskresenskiy is a lunar impact crater that is located near the western limb of the Moon. Due to its position, this crater is viewed edge-on, limiting the amount of detail that can be seen. The visibility of this formation is also affected by libration, so that this crater is sometimes hidden from sight, while at other times it can be more readily viewed.

The crater is located to the southeast of the walled plains Röntgen and Lorentz. To the south-southwest lies the crater Bartels, and slightly further to the east is the western edge of the Oceanus Procellarum.

The outer edge of this crater is only slightly worn, and the edge is still well-defined with only a few tiny craterlets lying along the southwestern rim. A small crater is attached to the exterior edge of the rim to the southeast. The inner wall has a shelf or terrace along the northern and western sides. The dark interior floor has been resurfaced by basaltic lava, and it has the same low albedo as the lunar mare to the east.

== Satellite craters ==
By convention these features are identified on lunar maps by placing the letter on the side of the crater midpoint that is closest to Voskresenskiy.

| Voskresenskiy | Latitude | Longitude | Diameter |
|---|---|---|---|
| K | 28.8° N | 84.1° W | 34 km |
