= Voskresenskoye, Alexandrovsky District, Vladimir Oblast =

Voskresenskoye Воскресенское
- Village
- Location within Vladimir Oblast Location within Russia
- Coordinates: 56°20′N 38°28′E
- Country: Russia
- Region: Vladimir Oblast
- District: Alexandrovsky District
- Time zone: UTC+3:00

Voskresenskoye (Russian: Воскресенское) is a rural locality (a village) in Karinskoye Rural Settlement, Alexandrovsky District, Vladimir Oblast, Russia. The population was 17 as of 2010. There are 5 streets.

== Geography ==
Voskresenskoye is located 23 km southwest of Alexandrov (the district's administrative centre) by road. Plekhany is the nearest rural locality.
