= Voskresenskoye, Savinsky District =

Voskresenskoye Воскресенское
- Village
- Location within Ivanovo Oblast Location within Russia
- Coordinates: 56°37′N 41°25′E
- Country: Russia
- Region: Ivanovo Oblast
- District: Savinsky District
- Time zone: UTC+3:00

Voskresenskoye (Russian: Воскресенское) is a rural locality (a selo) in Savinsky District, Ivanovo Oblast, Russia. Population: 792 (2010 census);

== Geography ==
This rural locality is located 13 kilometres (8.1 mi) from Savino (the district's administrative centre), 50 kilometres (31 mi) from Ivanovo (capital of Ivanovo Oblast) and 252 kilometres (157 mi) from Moscow. Novo is the nearest rural locality.
