= Nernst (crater) =

Lunar crater

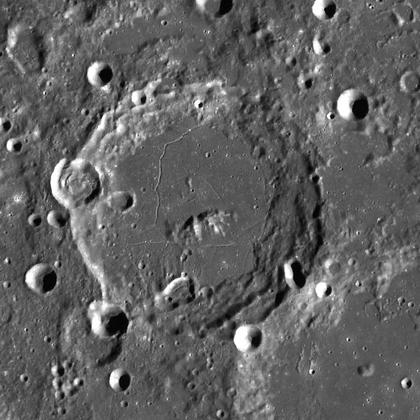
- LRO mosaic
- Coordinates: 35.57°N 94.64°W
- Diameter: 121.52 km (75.51 mi)
- Depth: Unknown
- Colongitude: 96° at sunrise
- Eponym: Walther H. Nernst

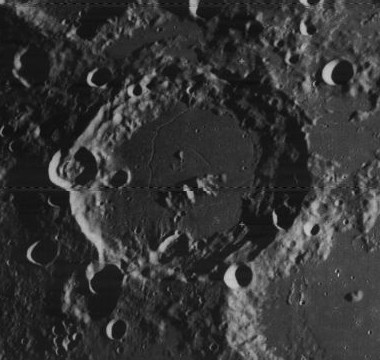
Lunar Orbiter 4 image

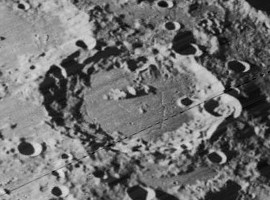
Another Lunar Orbiter 4 image, facing south

Nernst is a lunar impact crater that lies on the far side of the Moon, just beyond the northwestern limb. It lies across the northern part of a larger walled plain named Lorentz, and intrudes slightly into the northwestern rim of the crater Röntgen.

The rim of Nernst is relatively well-defined, although several smaller impacts lie across the edge. The satellite crater Nernst T has broken through the western rim edge. Smaller craters also lie along the rim to the southwest and south-southeast. Around the remainder of the inner wall is some slumping and a few terrace-like features.

The interior of Nernst is relatively level, with a central peak formation offset slightly to the south of the midpoint. A pair of small craters lies on the interior floor along the western and southern inner edges. Parts of the remaining floor are marked by a series of rilles. In the southern half these rilles form grooves running generally from east to west. The infrared spectrum of pure crystalline plagioclase has been identified within and around this crater.

Prior to formal naming by the IAU in 1970, Nernst was called Crater 183.

== Satellite craters ==
By convention these features are identified on lunar maps by placing the letter on the side of the crater midpoint that is closest to Nernst.

Nernst	Latitude	Longitude	Diameter
T	35.8° N	96.9° W	25 km
