= Voskresenskoye, Yuryev-Polsky District, Vladimir Oblast =

Voskresenskoye Воскресенское
- Village
- Location within Vladimir Oblast Location within Russia
- Coordinates: 56°26′N 39°51′E
- Country: Russia
- Region: Vladimir Oblast
- District: Yuryev-Polsky District
- Time zone: UTC+3:00

Voskresenskoye (Russian: Воскресенское) is a rural locality (a village) in Nebylovskoye Rural Settlement, Yuryev-Polsky District, Vladimir Oblast, Russia. The population was 41 as of 2010.

== Geography ==
Voskresenskoye is located on the Vykros River, 15 km southeast from Yuryev-Polsky (the district's administrative centre) by road. Nikulskoye is the nearest rural locality.
