= Voskresenskoye, Kineshemsky District, Ivanovo Oblast =

Voskresenskoye Воскресенское
- Village
- Location within Ivanovo Oblast Location within Russia
- Coordinates: 57°10′N 42°25′E
- Country: Russia
- Region: Ivanovo Oblast
- District: Kineshemsky District
- Time zone: UTC+3:00

Voskresenskoye (Russian: Воскресенское) is a rural locality (a selo) in Kineshemsky District, Ivanovo Oblast, Russia. Population: 78 (2010 census);

== Geography ==
This rural locality is located 35 kilometres (22 mi) from Kineshma (the district's administrative centre), 90 kilometres (56 mi) from Ivanovo (capital of Ivanovo Oblast) and 330 kilometres (210 mi) from Moscow. Shumovskaya is the nearest rural locality.
