= Leonid Voskresensky =

Soviet rocket engineer

- Born: 14 June 1913; Pavlovsky Posad, Russia
- Died: 14 December 1965 (aged 52); Moscow, Russia
- Occupation(s): Soviet rocket scientist and engineer
- Known for: Deputy Chief Designer of Soviet Space Program

Leonid Alexandrovich Voskresensky (Russian: Леонид Александрович Воскресенский; 14 June 1913 – 14 December 1965) was a Soviet engineer in the Soviet space program, and long-time associate of Chief Designer Sergei Korolev. He served as launch director for Sputnik and for the first crewed space flight, Vostok 1. The lunar crater Voskresenskiy is named in his honor.

== Biography ==
Voskresensky was born on 14 June 1913 in the town of Pavlovsky Posad. His mother was Yekaterina Sokolov (1880-1956); his father, Alexander Voskresensky (1875-1950), was a priest at St. Nicholas Church in Pavlovsky Posad and later was the senior priest at the Church of St. John the Warrior in Moscow.

From 1929 to 1936 he worked as an electrician while also studying at Moscow Power Engineering Institute. In 1936 he was drafted into the army, where he served as an engineer.

In 1945, he was sent to Germany with a team that was trying to identify engineers and German rocket equipment, such as the A-4 and the V-2. In 1946, he led the Vystral group, which performed test flights of V-2 rockets at the Soviet missile institute in Nordhausen, Germany.

Voskresensky continued to head several rocket test programs until 1953, when he was appointed as a Deputy Chief Designer of the primary Soviet rocket design bureau, OKB-1, under Sergei Korolev. During his tenure at OKB-1, the bureau achieved several significant achievements in rocketry and space flight, such as the engine used for the first intercontinental ballistic missile, the R-7 Semyorka, the first spacecraft in orbit, Sputnik, and the first crewed orbital space flight, Vostok 1.

In 1963, health issues led Voskresensky to become an instructor at the Moscow Aviation Institute. He also continued to serve as a consultant with OKB-1, as "acting head of department of scientific tests."

Leonid Voskresensky died 14 December 1965. At his funeral, his eulogy was delivered by Sergei Korolev. He was buried with honors in Moscow's Novodevichy Cemetery. Due to the secrecy surrounding the Soviet space program at the time, he was only identified in the press as "a scholar in the field of the elaboration and testing models of new machinery."

== Historical depictions ==
Historian Asif Siddiqi described Voskresensky as "one of the most colorful characters of the Soviet space program." Anecdotes of his adventures are featured in several histories of the space race.

In Rockets and People, scientist and historian Boris Chertok recounted how Voskresensky reacted when a missile being tested developed a leak of a supposedly radioactive substance. As others rushed away, he calmly walked up to the rocket and climbed the gantry. He ran his finger through the liquid, and in full view of the launch crew, put his finger on his tongue to demonstrate that the substance was harmless. He then called on everyone to return to work.

Author Matthew Brzezinski documented an unusual technique that Voskresensky developed for fixing some issues with the R-9 missile:

Korolev's head of testing, the equally crotchety Leonid Voskresensky — the only person among the thousands of NII-88 and OKB-1 employees permitted to address Sergei Korolev by his first name, without the formal patronymic — had a decidedly low-tech method for dealing with leaks. He would wrap his cap over the faulty valve and urinate on it. The minus-297-degree liquid oxygen would freeze the urine on contact, sealing the leak.

— Red Moon Rising

== Awards and honors ==
- Hero of Socialist Labor (1958) for Sputnik-1.
- Two Orders of Lenin (1958, 1961) for Sputnik-1 and Vostok-1.
- Order of the Red Star (1945).
- The International Astronomical Union named the lunar crater Voskresenskiy after him in 1970.
