= Voskresenskoye, Vozhegodsky District, Vologda Oblast =

Voskresenskoye Воскресенское
- Selo
- Location within Vologda Oblast Location within Russia
- Coordinates: 60°21′N 39°11′E
- Country: Russia
- Region: Vologda Oblast
- District: Vozhegodsky District
- Time zone: UTC+3:00

Voskresenskoye (Russian: Воскресенское) is a rural locality (a selo) in Beketovskoye Rural Settlement, Vozhegodsky District, Vologda Oblast, Russia. The population was 8 as of 2002.

== Geography ==
Voskresenskoye is located 75 km southwest of Vozhega (the district's administrative centre) by road. Nikulskaya is the nearest rural locality.
