= Voskresenskoye, Kameshkovsky District, Vladimir Oblast =

Voskresenskoye Воскресенское
- Selo
- Location within Vladimir Oblast Location within Russia
- Coordinates: 56°13′N 41°02′E
- Country: Russia
- Region: Vladimir Oblast
- District: Kameshkovsky District
- Time zone: UTC+3:00

Voskresenskoye (Russian: Воскресенское) is a rural locality (a selo) in Penkinskoye Rural Settlement, Kameshkovsky District, Vladimir Oblast, Russia. The population was 13 as of 2010.

== Geography ==
Voskresenskoye is located 37 km south of Kameshkovo (the district's administrative centre) by road. Pirogovo is the nearest rural locality.
