= Voskresenskoye, Gryazovetsky District, Vologda Oblast =

Voskresenskoye Воскресенское
- Selo
- Location within Vologda Oblast Location within Russia
- Coordinates: 59°03′N 40°28′E
- Country: Russia
- Region: Vologda Oblast
- District: Gryazovetsky District
- Time zone: UTC+3:00

Voskresenskoye (Russian: Воскресенское) is a rural locality (a selo) in Komyanskoye Rural Settlement, Gryazovetsky District, Vologda Oblast, Russia. The population was 7 as of 2002.

== Geography ==
Voskresenskoye is located 40 km northeast of Gryazovets (the district's administrative centre) by road. Popovka is the nearest rural locality.
