= Voskresenskoye, Lezhnevsky District, Ivanovo Oblast =

Voskresenskoye Воскресенское
- Village
- Location within Ivanovo Oblast Location within Russia
- Coordinates: 56°42′N 40°57′E
- Country: Russia
- Region: Ivanovo Oblast
- District: Lezhnevsky District
- Time zone: UTC+3:00

Voskresenskoye (Russian: Воскресенское) is a rural locality (a selo) in Lezhnevsky District, Ivanovo Oblast, Russia. Population: 651 (2010 census);

== Geography ==
This rural locality is located 9 kilometres (5.6 mi) from Lezhnevo (the district's administrative centre), 33 kilometres (21 mi) from Ivanovo (capital of Ivanovo Oblast) and 230 kilometres (140 mi) from Moscow. Yamanovo is the nearest rural locality.
