= Voskresenskoye, Kugarchinsky District, Republic of Bashkortostan =

Voskresenskoye Воскресенское
- Village
- Location within Bashkortostan Location within Russia
- Coordinates: 52°47′N 56°21′E
- Country: Russia
- Region: Bashkortostan
- District: Kugarchinsky District
- Time zone: UTC+5:00

Voskresenskoye (Russian: Воскресенское) is a rural locality (a village) and the administrative centre of Zarechensky Selsoviet, Kugarchinsky District, Bashkortostan, Russia. The population was 629 as of 2010. There are 11 streets.

== Geography ==
Voskresenskoye is located 22 km northwest of Mrakovo (the district's administrative centre) by road. Kaldarovo is the nearest rural locality.
