= Voskresensky District, Saratov Oblast =

Voskresensky District Воскресенский район (Russian)
- District
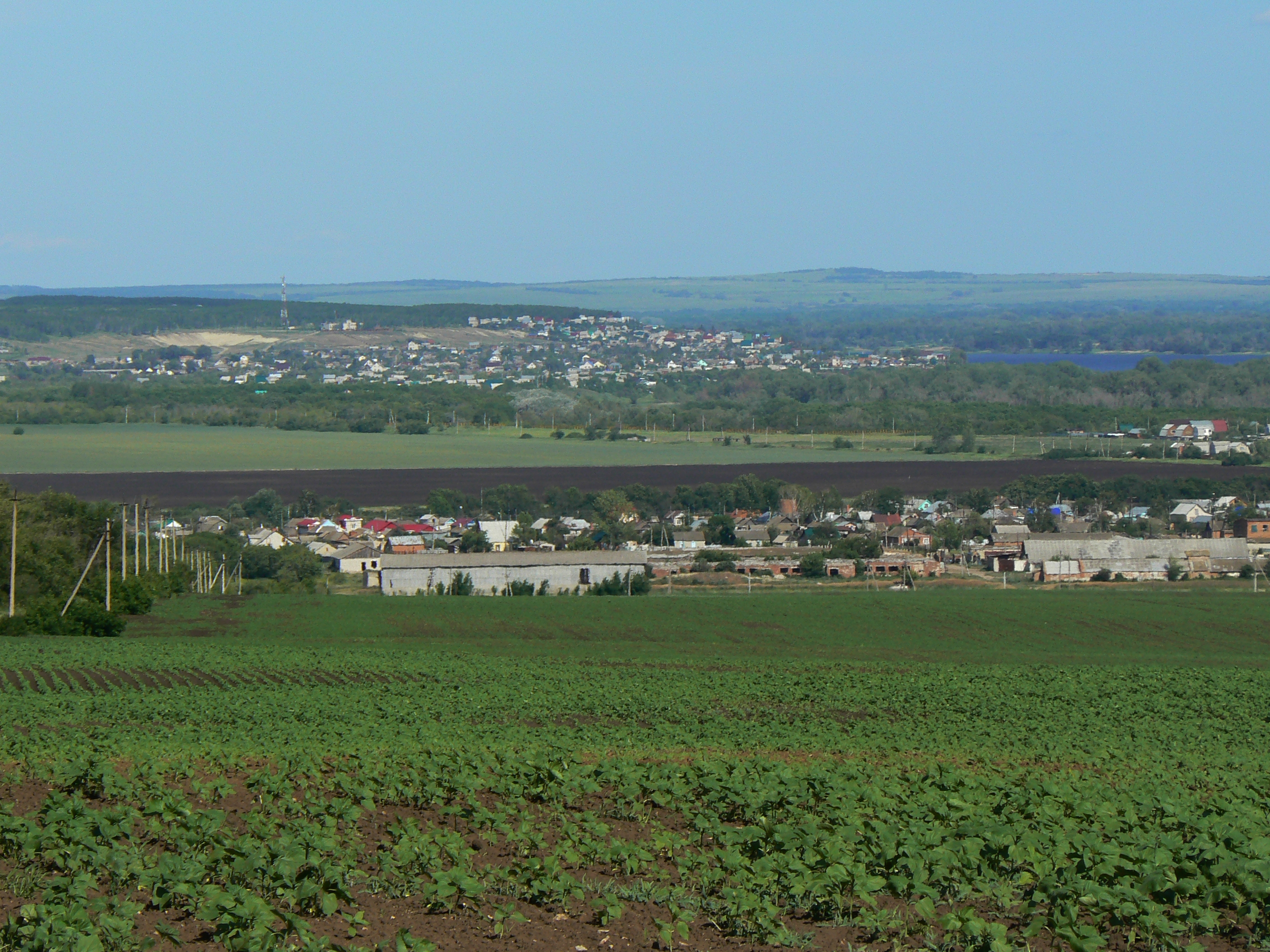
- Elshanka and village (selo) Usovka, Voskresensky District

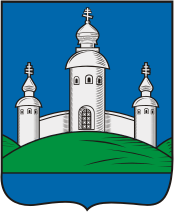
- Coat of arms
- Location of Voskresensky District in Saratov Oblast
- Coordinates: 51°49′28″N 46°56′06″E
- Country: Russia
- Federal subject: Saratov Oblast
- Established: 23 July 1928
- Administrative center: Voskresenskoye

Area
  - Total: 1,400 km^{2} (540 sq mi)

Population (2010 Census)
  - Total: 12,098
  - Density: 8.6/km^{2} (22/sq mi)
  - Urban: 0%
  - Rural: 100%

Administrative structure
  - Inhabited localities: 28 rural localities

Municipal structure
  - Municipally incorporated as: Voskresensky Municipal District
  - Municipal divisions: 0 urban settlements, 3 rural settlements
- Time zone: UTC+4 (MSK+1)
- OKTMO ID: 63612000
- Website: http://voskresensk64.ru/

Voskresensky District (Russian: Воскресенский райо́н) is an administrative and municipal district (raion), one of the thirty-eight in Saratov Oblast, Russia. It is located in the center of the oblast. The area of the district is 1,400 square kilometers (540 sq mi). Its administrative center is the rural locality (a selo) of Voskresenskoye. Population: 12,098 (2010 Census); 12,008 (2002 census); 12,080 (1989 Soviet census). The population of Voskresenskoye accounts for 27.4% of the district's total population.
