= Lorentz (crater) =

Lunar impact crater on the northwest limb of the Moon

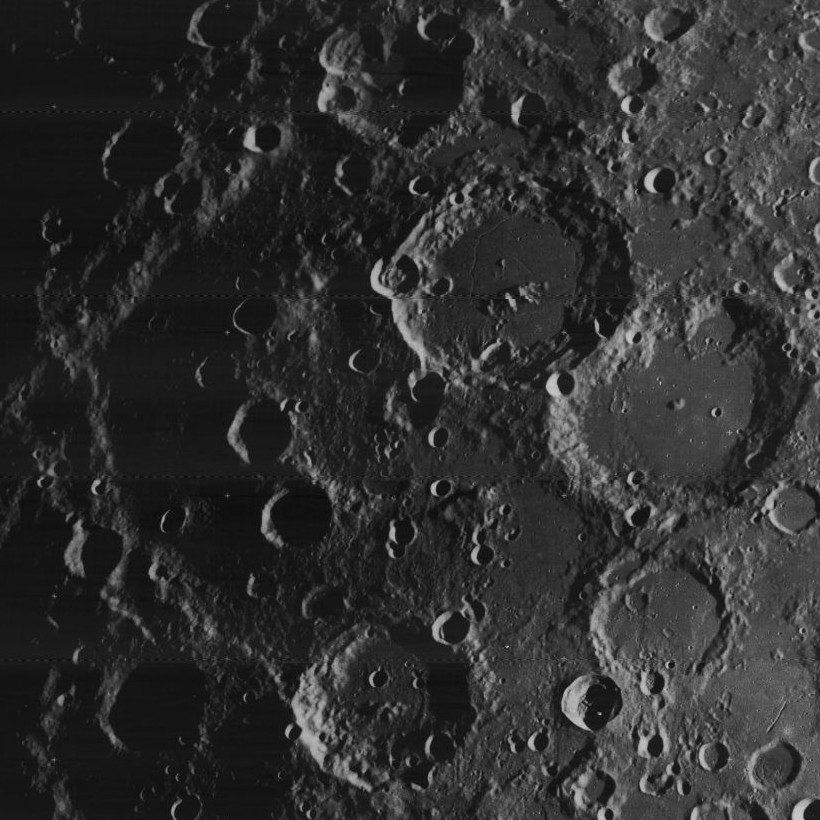
- Lunar Orbiter 4 image
- Coordinates: 32.6°N 95.3°W
- Diameter: 312 km
- Depth: 4.45 km (2.77 mi)
- Colongitude: 103° at sunrise
- Formation: Pre-Nectarian
- Eponym: Hendrik Lorentz

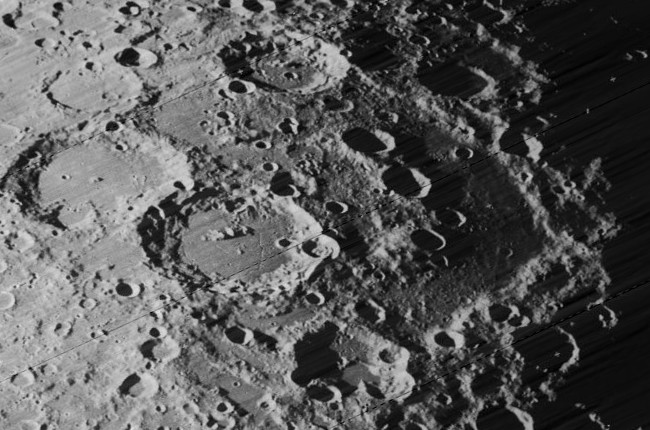
Oblique view facing south

Lorentz is a huge lunar impact crater that lies just beyond the northwest limb on the far side of the Moon, in a region that is brought into sight of the Earth during favorable librations. This class of formation is known as a peak ring basin, which has a single interior topographic ring or a discontinuous ring of peaks with no central peak. It dates to the Pre-Nectarian period of the lunar geologic timescale.

This formation is nearly as large as the Mare Nectaris on the near side of the Moon, although it has not been submerged by lava as have the lunar mare. Sections of the crater floor are, however, relatively level, particularly an arc along the western rim. But this last region is still marked by a number of tiny craterlets. The remainder of the interior is rough and irregular, and marked with a multitude of impacts.

Lorentz contains a prominent crater pairing, with Nernst located just to the north of Lorentz's midpoint, and Röntgen attached to the southeastern rim of Nernst. Lying across the southern rim of Lorentz is Laue, and Avicenna lies across the northwestern rim. Near the more indeterminate eastern rim of Lorentz is Aston.

== Satellite craters ==
By convention these features are identified on lunar maps by placing the letter on the side of the crater midpoint that is closest to Lorentz.

Lorentz	Latitude	Longitude	Diameter
P	31.8° N	98.5° W	38 km
R	33.4° N	99.2° W	33 km
T	34.6° N	100.3° W	20 km
U	35.0° N	100.0° W	22 km
