= Zilairsky District =

Zilairsky District Зилаирский район (Russian)
- District

Other transcription(s)
  - Bashkir: Йылайыр районы
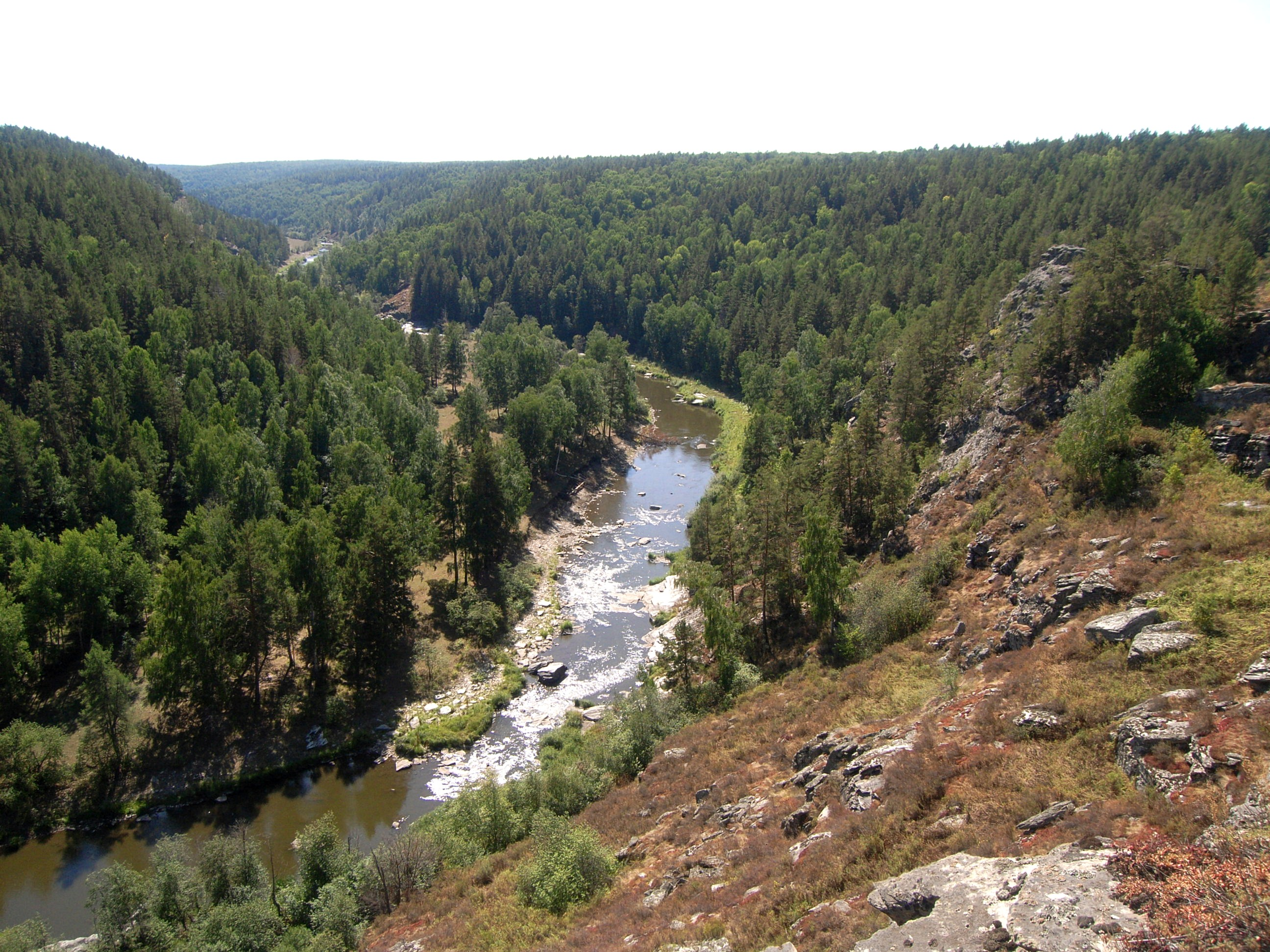
- The Sakmara River in Zilairsky District

- Flag Coat of arms
- Location of Zilairsky District in the Republic of Bashkortostan
- Coordinates: 52°14′N 57°26′E
- Country: Russia
- Federal subject: Republic of Bashkortostan
- Established: 1930
- Administrative center: Zilair

Area
  - Total: 5,773.99 km^{2} (2,229.35 sq mi)

Population (2010 Census)
  - Total: 16,590
  - Estimate (2018): 14,894 (−10.2%)
  - Density: 2.873/km^{2} (7.442/sq mi)
  - Urban: 0%
  - Rural: 100%

Administrative structure
  - Administrative divisions: 13 Selsoviets
  - Inhabited localities: 57 rural localities

Municipal structure
  - Municipally incorporated as: Zilairsky Municipal District
  - Municipal divisions: 0 urban settlements, 13 rural settlements
- Time zone: UTC+5 (MSK+2)
- OKTMO ID: 80627000
- Website: https://zilair.bashkortostan.ru/

Zilairsky District (Russian: Зилаи́рский райо́н; Bashkir: Йылайыр районы, Yılayır rayonı) is an administrative and municipal district (raion), one of the fifty-four in the Republic of Bashkortostan, Russia. It is located in the south of the republic and borders with Burzyansky District in the north, Baymaksky District in the east, Khaybullinsky District in the southeast and south, Zianchurinsky District in the southwest and west, and with Kugarchinsky District in the west and northwest. The area of the district is 5,773.99 square kilometers (2,229.35 sq mi). Its administrative center is the rural locality (a selo) of Zilair. As of the 2010 Census, the total population of the district was 16,590, with the population of Zilair accounting for 33.7% of that number.

== History ==
The district was established in 1930.

== Administrative and municipal status ==
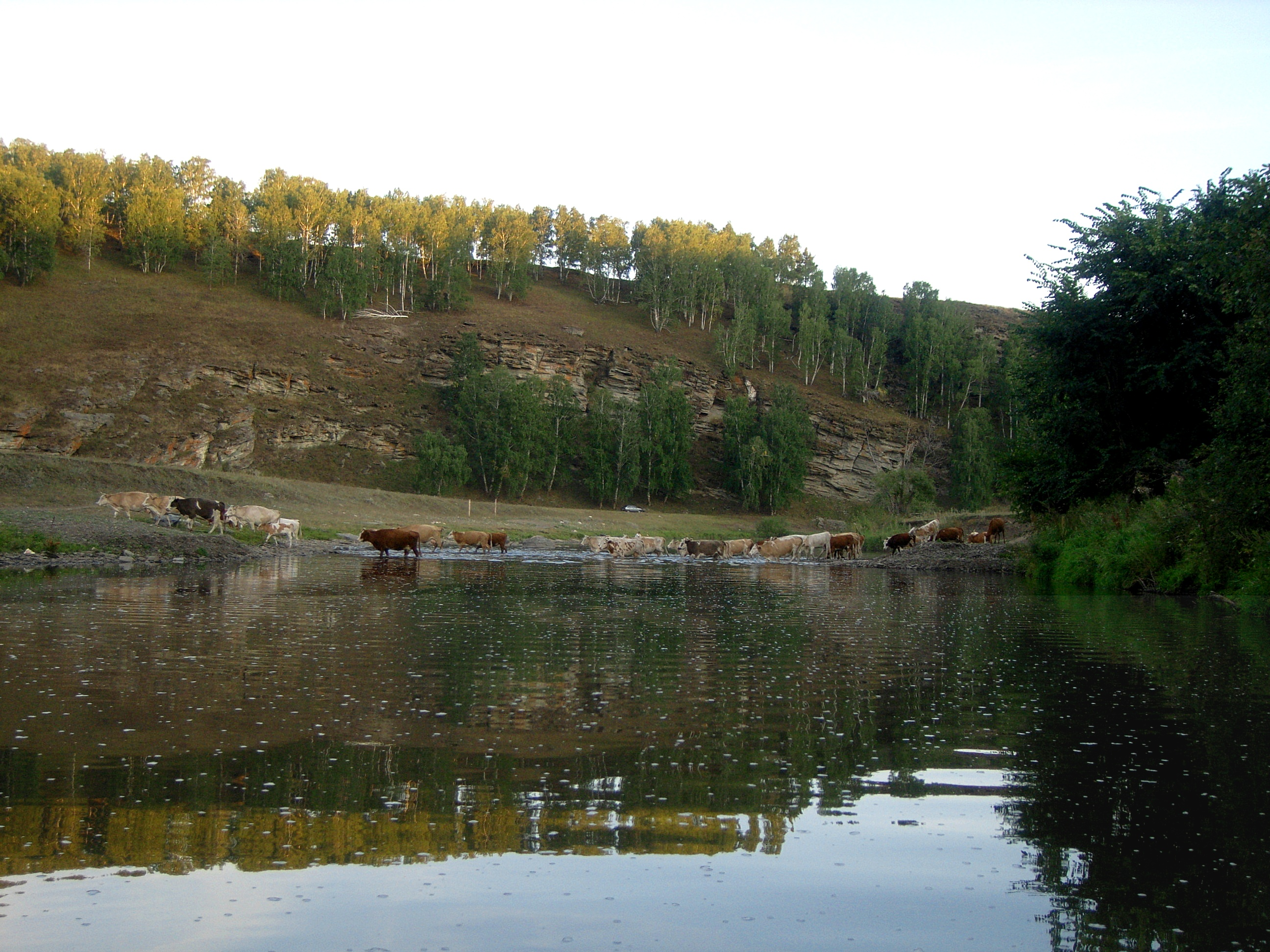
Cows at the ford across the Sakmara river near Maloyuldybayevo village

Within the framework of administrative divisions, Zilairsky District is one of the fifty-four in the Republic of Bashkortostan. The district is divided into thirteen selsoviets, comprising fifty-seven rural localities. As a municipal division, the district is incorporated as Zilairsky Municipal District. Its thirteen selsoviets are incorporated as thirteen rural settlements within the municipal district. The selo of Zilair serves as the administrative center of both the administrative and municipal district.

== Demographics ==
Population of Zianchurinsky District
- 2010 Census: 16,590
- 2002 Census: 18,939
- 1989 Census: 18,734
- 1979 Census: 21,777

Ethnic composition (as of the 2010 Census):

- Bashkirs: 56.5%
- Tatars: 3.2%
- Russians: 36.2%
- Chuvash: 2.8%
- other ethnicities: 1.3%
