= Zilair =

Zilair Зилаир
- Selo
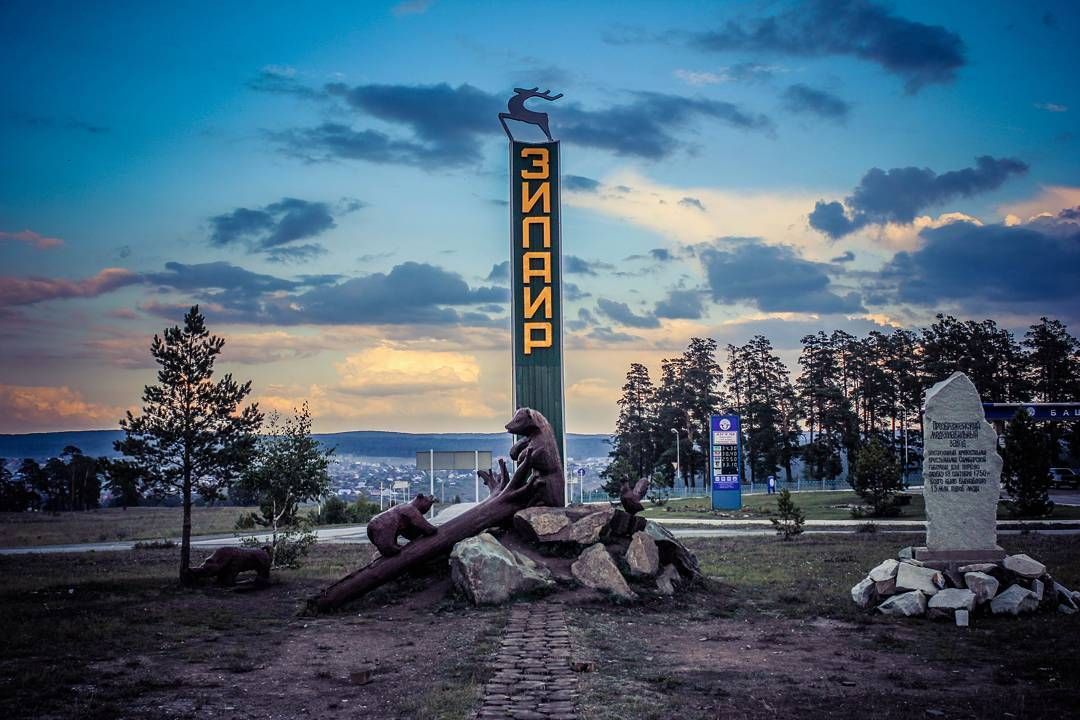
- View of Zilair sign

- Flag
- Interactive map of Zilair
- Location of Zilair Zilair (Bashkortostan)
- Coordinates: 52°13′56″N 57°26′25″E
- Country: Russia
- Federal subject: Bashkortostan
- Administrative district: Zilairsky District
- Founded: 1748
- Elevation: 540 m (1,770 ft)

Population (2010 Census)
  - Total: 5,585

Administrative status
  - Capital of: Zilairsky District
- Time zone: UTC+5 (MSK+2)
- Postal code: 453680
- OKTMO ID: 80627416101

Zilair (Russian: Зилаи́р; Bashkir: Йылайыр, Yılayır) is a rural locality (a selo) and the administrative center of Zilairsky District in the Republic of Bashkortostan, Russia. Population: 5,585 (2010 census); 5,861 (2002 census); 5,037 (1989 Soviet census).

Site of a 1921 Peasant Uprising Execution & Burial monument.

== Climate ==
Climate data for Zilair (extremes 1936-present)
Month	Jan	Feb	Mar	Apr	May	Jun	Jul	Aug	Sep	Oct	Nov	Dec	Year
Record high °C (°F)	12.0 (53.6)	12.3 (54.1)	15.4 (59.7)	27.6 (81.7)	33.3 (91.9)	36.0 (96.8)	38.4 (101.1)	36.5 (97.7)	35.3 (95.5)	23.4 (74.1)	14.3 (57.7)	6.8 (44.2)	38.4 (101.1)
Mean daily maximum °C (°F)	−8.8 (16.2)	−6.8 (19.8)	−0.4 (31.3)	9.9 (49.8)	19.0 (66.2)	23.6 (74.5)	25.0 (77.0)	23.8 (74.8)	17.0 (62.6)	8.3 (46.9)	−1.9 (28.6)	−7.3 (18.9)	8.5 (47.2)
Daily mean °C (°F)	−13.1 (8.4)	−12.1 (10.2)	−5.6 (21.9)	4.2 (39.6)	12.2 (54.0)	16.8 (62.2)	18.5 (65.3)	16.8 (62.2)	10.4 (50.7)	3.3 (37.9)	−5.4 (22.3)	−11.4 (11.5)	2.9 (37.2)
Mean daily minimum °C (°F)	−16.8 (1.8)	−16.7 (1.9)	−10.4 (13.3)	−1.1 (30.0)	5.4 (41.7)	9.9 (49.8)	12.2 (54.0)	10.3 (50.5)	4.6 (40.3)	−0.9 (30.4)	−8.4 (16.9)	−15.1 (4.8)	−2.3 (28.0)
Record low °C (°F)	−44.1 (−47.4)	−46.9 (−52.4)	−39.6 (−39.3)	−32.2 (−26.0)	−10.0 (14.0)	−5.4 (22.3)	−0.5 (31.1)	−3.9 (25.0)	−11.2 (11.8)	−28.6 (−19.5)	−39.6 (−39.3)	−41.6 (−42.9)	−46.9 (−52.4)
Average precipitation mm (inches)	41.8 (1.65)	38.4 (1.51)	42.7 (1.68)	42.1 (1.66)	40.5 (1.59)	45.1 (1.78)	50.6 (1.99)	36.3 (1.43)	37.9 (1.49)	49.6 (1.95)	48.4 (1.91)	46.4 (1.83)	519.8 (20.47)
Source: pogoda.ru.net
