= Aeroport, Jewish Autonomous Oblast =

Aeroport Аэропорт
- Selo
- Location within Jewish Autonomous Oblast Location within Russia
- Coordinates: 48°34′N 133°01′E
- Country: Russia
- Region: Jewish Autonomous Oblast
- District: Birobidzhansky District
- Time zone: UTC+10:00

Aeroport (Russian: Аэропорт) is a rural locality (a selo) in Birobidzhansky District, Jewish Autonomous Oblast, Russia. Population: 62 (2010 census); 60 (2002 census); There is 1 street in this selo.

== Geography ==
This rural locality is located 25 km from Birobidzhan (the district's administrative centre and capital of Jewish Autonomous Oblast) and 7,064 km from Moscow. Zhyolty Yar is the nearest rural locality.
