= Zhyolty Yar =

Zhyolty Yar Жёлтый Яр
- Selo
- Location within Jewish Autonomous Oblast Location within Russia
- Coordinates: 48°34′N 133°03′E
- Country: Russia
- Region: Jewish Autonomous Oblast
- District: Birobidzhansky District
- Time zone: UTC+10:00

Zhyolty Yar (Russian: Жёлтый Яр) is a rural locality (a selo) in Birobidzhansky District, Jewish Autonomous Oblast, Russia. Population: 511 (2010 census); 569 (2002 census); There are 7 streets in this selo.

== Geography ==
This rural locality is located 27 km from Birobidzhan (the district's administrative centre and capital of Jewish Autonomous Oblast) and 7,068 km from Moscow. Aeroport is the nearest rural locality.
