= Stolbovoye =

Stolbovoye Столбовое
- Selo
- Location within Jewish Autonomous Oblast Location within Russia
- Coordinates: 47°55′N 131°03′E
- Country: Russia
- Region: Jewish Autonomous Oblast
- District: Oktyabrsky District
- Time zone: UTC+10:00

Stolbovoye (Russian: Столбовое) is a rural locality (a selo) in Oktyabrsky District, Jewish Autonomous Oblast, Russia. Population: 304 (2010 census); 431 (2002 census); There are 8 streets in this selo.

== Geography ==
This rural locality is located 25 km from Amurzet (the district's administrative centre), 170 km from Birobidzhan (capital of Jewish Autonomous Oblast) and 7,017 km from Moscow. Soyuznoye is the nearest rural locality.
