= Soyuznoye =

Soyuznoye Союзное
- Selo
- Location within Jewish Autonomous Oblast Location within Russia
- Coordinates: 47°54′N 130°54′E
- Country: Russia
- Region: Jewish Autonomous Oblast
- District: Oktyabrsky District
- Time zone: UTC+10:00

Soyuznoye (Russian: Союзное) is a rural locality (a selo) in Oktyabrsky District, Jewish Autonomous Oblast, Russia. Population: 37 (2010 census); There is 1 street in this selo.

== Geography ==
This rural locality is located 27 km from Amurzet (the district's administrative centre), 180 km from Birobidzhan (the capital of Jewish Autonomous Oblast) and 7,009 km from Moscow. Stolbovoye is the nearest rural locality.
