= Lisitsyn, Kursk Oblast =

Rural locality in Kursk Oblast, Russia

Lisitsyn Лисицын
- Khutor
- Interactive map of Lisitsyn
- Location of Lisitsyn Lisitsyn (Kursk Oblast)
- Coordinates: 51°51′40″N 35°28′27″E
- Country: Russia
- Federal subject: Kursk Oblast
- Administrative district: Konyshyovsky District
- SelsovietSelsoviet: Malogorodkovsky

Population (2010 Census)
  - Total: 0
  - Estimate (2010): 0 )

Municipal status
  - Municipal district: Konyshyovsky Municipal District
  - Rural settlement: Malogorodkovsky Selsoviet Rural Settlement
- Time zone: UTC+3 (MSK)
- Postal code: 307623
- Dialing code: +7 47156
- OKTMO ID: 38616426116
- Website: malogorod.rkursk.ru

Lisitsyn (Russian: Лисицын) is a rural locality (a khutor) in Malogorodkovsky Selsoviet Rural Settlement, Konyshyovsky District, Kursk Oblast, Russia. Population: 0 (2010 census); 12 (2002 census);

== Geography ==
The khutor is located on the Vablya River (a tributary of the Prutishche in the basin of the Seym), 72.5 km from the Russia–Ukraine border, 51 km north-west of Kursk, 12.5 km north-east of the district center – the urban-type settlement Konyshyovka, 6 km from the selsoviet center – Maloye Gorodkovo.

Climate

Lisitsyn has a warm-summer humid continental climate (Dfb in the Köppen climate classification).

== Transport ==
Lisitsyn is located 68 km from the federal route M-3 Ukraine Highway, 34 km from the route M-2 Crimea Highway, 44.5 km from the route A-142 (Trosna – M3 highway), 24 km from the road of regional importance 38K-038 (Fatezh – Dmitriyev), 10.5 km from the road 38K-005 (Konyshyovka – Zhigayevo – 38K-038), 25 km from the road 38K-017 (Kursk – Lgov – Rylsk – border with Ukraine), 4.5 km from the road of intermunicipal significance 38Н-136 (38K-005 – Maloye Gorodkovo – Bolshoye Gorodkovo), 1.5 km from the road 38Н-138 (38N-136 – Ozerovka – Yuryevka – Pavlovka), 12 km from the nearest railway halt 552 km (railway line Navlya – Lgov-Kiyevsky).

The rural locality is situated 57 km from Kursk Vostochny Airport, 154 km from Belgorod International Airport and 258 km from Voronezh Peter the Great Airport.
