= Makeyev, Kursk Oblast =

Rural locality in Kursk Oblast, Russia

Makeyev Макеев
- Khutor
- Interactive map of Makeyev
- Location of Makeyev Makeyev (Kursk Oblast)
- Coordinates: 51°52′52″N 35°28′24″E
- Country: Russia
- Federal subject: Kursk Oblast
- Administrative district: Konyshyovsky District
- SelsovietSelsoviet: Malogorodkovsky

Population (2010 Census)
  - Total: 4
  - Estimate (2010): 4 (0%)

Municipal status
  - Municipal district: Konyshyovsky Municipal District
  - Rural settlement: Malogorodkovsky Selsoviet Rural Settlement
- Time zone: UTC+3 (MSK)
- Postal code: 307623
- Dialing code: +7 47156
- OKTMO ID: 38616426121
- Website: malogorod.rkursk.ru

Makeyev (Russian: Макеев) is a rural locality (a khutor) in Malogorodkovsky Selsoviet Rural Settlement, Konyshyovsky District, Kursk Oblast, Russia. Population: 4 (2010 census); 13 (2002 census);

== Geography ==
The khutor is located on the Vablya River (a tributary of the Prutishche in the basin of the Seym), 73 km from the Russia–Ukraine border, 52 km north-west of Kursk, 13 km north-east of the district center – the urban-type settlement Konyshyovka, 5 km from the selsoviet center – Maloye Gorodkovo.

Climate

Makeyev has a warm-summer humid continental climate (Dfb in the Köppen climate classification).

== Transport ==
Makeyev is located 68 km from the federal route M-3 Ukraine Highway, 32.5 km from the route M-2 Crimea Highway, 42 km from the route A-142 (Trosna – M3 highway), 22 km from the road of regional importance 38K-038 (Fatezh – Dmitriyev), 9 km from the road 38K-005 (Konyshyovka – Zhigayevo – 38K-038), 26.5 km from the road 38K-017 (Kursk – Lgov – Rylsk – border with Ukraine), 2.5 km from the road of intermunicipal significance 38Н-136 (38K-005 – Maloye Gorodkovo – Bolshoye Gorodkovo), 1 km from the road 38Н-138 (38N-136 – Ozerovka – Yuryevka – Pavlovka), 11 km from the nearest railway halt 552 km (railway line Navlya – Lgov-Kiyevsky).

The rural locality is situated 58 km from Kursk Vostochny Airport, 156 km from Belgorod International Airport and 259 km from Voronezh Peter the Great Airport.
