= Beryozovets, Konyshyovsky District, Kursk Oblast =

Rural locality in Kursk Oblast, Russia

Beryozovets Берёзовец
- Khutor
- Interactive map of Beryozovets
- Location of Beryozovets Beryozovets (Kursk Oblast)
- Coordinates: 51°53′16″N 35°29′30″E
- Country: Russia
- Federal subject: Kursk Oblast
- Administrative district: Konyshyovsky District
- SelsovietSelsoviet: Malogorodkovsky

Population (2010 Census)
  - Total: 13
  - Estimate (2010): 13 (0%)

Municipal status
  - Municipal district: Konyshyovsky Municipal District
  - Rural settlement: Malogorodkovsky Selsoviet Rural Settlement
- Time zone: UTC+3 (MSK)
- Postal code: 307623
- Dialing code: +7 47156
- OKTMO ID: 38616426106
- Website: malogorod.rkursk.ru

Beryozovets (Russian: Берёзовец) is a rural locality (a khutor) in Malogorodkovsky Selsoviet Rural Settlement, Konyshyovsky District, Kursk Oblast, Russia. Population: 13 (2010 census); 46 (2002 census);

== Geography ==
The khutor is located in the Vablya River basin (a tributary of the Prutishche in the basin of the Seym), 75 km from the Russia–Ukraine border, 50 km north-west of Kursk, 15.5 km north-east of the district center – the urban-type settlement Konyshyovka, 2.5 km from the selsoviet center – Maloye Gorodkovo.

Climate

Beryozovets has a warm-summer humid continental climate (Dfb in the Köppen climate classification).

== Transport ==
Beryozovets is located 69 km from the federal route M-3 Ukraine Highway, 31 km from the route M-2 Crimea Highway, 42 km from the route A-142 (Trosna – M3 highway), 21 km from the road of regional importance 38K-038 (Fatezh – Dmitriyev), 9 km from the road 38K-005 (Konyshyovka – Zhigayevo – 38K-038), 27 km from the road 38K-017 (Kursk – Lgov – Rylsk – border with Ukraine), 3 km from the road of intermunicipal significance 38Н-136 (38K-005 – Maloye Gorodkovo – Bolshoye Gorodkovo), on the road 38Н-137 (38N-136 – Glazovo – Beryozovets), 13 km from the nearest railway halt 552 km (railway line Navlya – Lgov-Kiyevsky).

The rural locality is situated 56 km from Kursk Vostochny Airport, 156 km from Belgorod International Airport and 257 km from Voronezh Peter the Great Airport.
