= Klesovo, Kursk Oblast =

Rural locality in Kursk Oblast, Russia

Klesovo Клесово
- Village
- Interactive map of Klesovo
- Location of Klesovo Klesovo (Kursk Oblast)
- Coordinates: 51°52′27″N 35°32′00″E
- Country: Russia
- Federal subject: Kursk Oblast
- Administrative district: Konyshyovsky District
- SelsovietSelsoviet: Malogorodkovsky

Population (2010 Census)
  - Total: 9
  - Estimate (2010): 9 (0%)

Municipal status
  - Municipal district: Konyshyovsky Municipal District
  - Rural settlement: Malogorodkovsky Selsoviet Rural Settlement
- Time zone: UTC+3 (MSK)
- Postal code: 307624
- Dialing code: +7 47156
- OKTMO ID: 38616426156
- Website: malogorod.rkursk.ru

Klesovo (Russian: Клесово) is a rural locality (Russian: деревня, lit. 'village') in Malogorodkovsky Selsoviet Rural Settlement, Konyshyovsky District, Kursk Oblast, Russia. Population: 9 (2010 census); 36 (2002 census);

== Geography ==
The village is located on the Gorodkov Brook (a tributary of the Prutishche in the basin of the Seym), 76.5 km from the Russia–Ukraine border, 48 km north-west of Kursk, 17 km north-east of the district center – the urban-type settlement Konyshyovka, 2.5 km from the selsoviet center – Maloye Gorodkovo.

Climate

Klesovo has a warm-summer humid continental climate (Dfb in the Köppen climate classification).

== Transport ==
Klesovo is located 72.5 km from the federal route M-3 Ukraine Highway, 29.5 km from the route M-2 Crimea Highway, 45 km from the route A-142 (Trosna – M3 highway), 23 km from the road of regional importance 38K-038 (Fatezh – Dmitriyev), 12 km from the road 38K-005 (Konyshyovka – Zhigayevo – 38K-038), 25 km from the road 38K-017 (Kursk – Lgov – Rylsk – border with Ukraine), 3 km from the road of intermunicipal significance 38Н-136 (38K-005 – Maloye Gorodkovo – Bolshoye Gorodkovo), 1.5 km from the road 38Н-139 (38N-136 – Yakovlevo), 15.5 km from the nearest railway halt 552 km (railway line Navlya – Lgov-Kiyevsky).

The rural locality is situated 53.5 km from Kursk Vostochny Airport, 154 km from Belgorod International Airport and 254 km from Voronezh Peter the Great Airport.
