= Kotlevo =

Rural locality in Kursk Oblast, Russia

Kotlevo Котлево
- Selo
- Interactive map of Kotlevo
- Location of Kotlevo Kotlevo (Kursk Oblast)
- Coordinates: 51°52′43″N 35°22′44″E
- Country: Russia
- Federal subject: Kursk Oblast
- Administrative district: Konyshyovsky District
- SelsovietSelsoviet: Zakharkovsky

Population (2010 Census)
  - Total: 62
  - Estimate (2010): 62 (0%)

Municipal status
  - Municipal district: Konyshyovsky Municipal District
  - Rural settlement: Zakharkovsky Selsoviet Rural Settlement
- Time zone: UTC+3 (MSK)
- Postal code: 307625
- Dialing code: +7 47156
- OKTMO ID: 38616420131
- Website: захарковский46.рф

Kotlevo (Russian: Котлево) is a rural locality (Russian: село, lit. 'village') in Zakharkovsky Selsoviet Rural Settlement, Konyshyovsky District, Kursk Oblast, Russia. Population: 62 (2010 census); 124 (2002 census);

== Geography ==
The village is located on the Kotlevka River (a tributary of the Vablya in the basin of the Seym), 67 km from the Russia–Ukraine border, 57 km north-west of Kursk, 7.5 km north-east of the district center – the urban-type settlement Konyshyovka, 8 km from the selsoviet center – Zakharkovo.

Climate

Kotlevo has a warm-summer humid continental climate (Dfb in the Köppen climate classification).

Climate data for Kotlevo
Month	Jan	Feb	Mar	Apr	May	Jun	Jul	Aug	Sep	Oct	Nov	Dec	Year
Mean daily maximum °C (°F)	−4.1 (24.6)	−3.2 (26.2)	2.6 (36.7)	12.7 (54.9)	19 (66)	22.3 (72.1)	24.9 (76.8)	24.1 (75.4)	17.9 (64.2)	10.3 (50.5)	3.3 (37.9)	−1.2 (29.8)	10.7 (51.3)
Daily mean °C (°F)	−6.1 (21.0)	−5.7 (21.7)	−0.9 (30.4)	7.9 (46.2)	14.4 (57.9)	18 (64)	20.6 (69.1)	19.6 (67.3)	13.7 (56.7)	7.1 (44.8)	1.1 (34.0)	−3.1 (26.4)	7.2 (45.0)
Mean daily minimum °C (°F)	−8.6 (16.5)	−8.7 (16.3)	−5 (23)	2.5 (36.5)	8.8 (47.8)	12.7 (54.9)	15.6 (60.1)	14.5 (58.1)	9.5 (49.1)	3.8 (38.8)	−1.1 (30.0)	−5.3 (22.5)	3.2 (37.8)
Average precipitation mm (inches)	51 (2.0)	45 (1.8)	47 (1.9)	51 (2.0)	62 (2.4)	72 (2.8)	78 (3.1)	56 (2.2)	59 (2.3)	58 (2.3)	48 (1.9)	50 (2.0)	677 (26.7)
Source: https://en.climate-data.org/asia/russian-federation/kursk-oblast/котлево-662709/

== Transport ==
Kotlevo is located 62 km from the federal route M-3 Ukraine Highway, 37 km from the route M-2 Crimea Highway, 39.5 km from the route A-142 (Trosna – M3 highway), 23 km from the road of regional importance 38K-038 (Fatezh – Dmitriyev), 4.5 km from the road 38K-005 (Konyshyovka – Zhigayevo – 38K-038), on the road of intermunicipal significance 38Н-136 (38K-005 – Maloye Gorodkovo – Bolshoye Gorodkovo), 5.5 km from the nearest railway halt 552 km (railway line Navlya – Lgov-Kiyevsky).

The rural locality is situated 63 km from Kursk Vostochny Airport, 159 km from Belgorod International Airport and 264 km from Voronezh Peter the Great Airport.
