= Trostnitsa =

Rural locality in Kursk Oblast, Russia

Trostnitsa Тростница
- Khutor
- Interactive map of Trostnitsa
- Location of Trostnitsa Trostnitsa (Kursk Oblast)
- Coordinates: 51°49′06″N 35°17′54″E
- Country: Russia
- Federal subject: Kursk Oblast
- Administrative district: Konyshyovsky District
- SelsovietSelsoviet: Prilepsky

Population (2010 Census)
  - Total: 4
  - Estimate (2010): 4 (0%)

Municipal status
  - Municipal district: Konyshyovsky Municipal District
  - Rural settlement: Prilepsky Selsoviet Rural Settlement
- Time zone: UTC+3 (MSK)
- Postal code: 307605
- Dialing code: +7 47156
- OKTMO ID: 38616440116
- Website: prilepy.ru

Trostnitsa (Russian: Тростница) is a rural locality (a khutor) in Prilepsky Selsoviet Rural Settlement, Konyshyovsky District, Kursk Oblast, Russia. Population: 4 (2010 census); 13 (2002 census);

== Geography ==
The khutor is located in the Prutishche River basin (in the basin of the Seym), 60 km from the Russia–Ukraine border, 62.5 km west of Kursk, 3 km south of the district center – the urban-type settlement Konyshyovka, 4.5 km from the selsoviet center – Prilepy.

Climate

Trostnitsa has a warm-summer humid continental climate (Dfb in the Köppen climate classification).

== Transport ==
Trostnitsa is located 57 km from the federal route M-3 Ukraine Highway, 46 km from the route M-2 Crimea Highway, 43 km from the route A-142 (Trosna – M3 highway), 28 km from the road of regional importance 38K-038 (Fatezh – Dmitriyev), 1.5 km from the road 38K-005 (Konyshyovka – Zhigayevo – 38K-038), 2.5 km from the road 38K-023 (Lgov – Konyshyovka), 1 km from the road of intermunicipal significance 38Н-134 (38K-005 – Zakharkovo), 2.5 km from the nearest railway halt 565 km (railway line Navlya – Lgov-Kiyevsky).

The rural locality is situated 68 km from Kursk Vostochny Airport, 157 km from Belgorod International Airport and 271 km from Voronezh Peter the Great Airport.
