= Verkhnyaya Vablya =

Rural locality in Kursk Oblast, Russia

Verkhnyaya Vablya Верхняя Вабля
- Village
- Interactive map of Verkhnyaya Vablya
- Location of Verkhnyaya Vablya Verkhnyaya Vablya (Kursk Oblast)
- Coordinates: 51°55′31″N 35°27′35″E
- Country: Russia
- Federal subject: Kursk Oblast
- Administrative district: Konyshyovsky District
- SelsovietSelsoviet: Malogorodkovsky

Population (2010 Census)
  - Total: 6
  - Estimate (2010): 6 (0%)

Municipal status
  - Municipal district: Konyshyovsky Municipal District
  - Rural settlement: Malogorodkovsky Selsoviet Rural Settlement
- Time zone: UTC+3 (MSK)
- Postal code: 307623
- Dialing code: +7 47156
- OKTMO ID: 38616426111
- Website: malogorod.rkursk.ru

Verkhnyaya Vablya (Russian: Верхняя Вабля) is a rural locality (Russian: деревня, lit. 'village') in Malogorodkovsky Selsoviet Rural Settlement, Konyshyovsky District, Kursk Oblast, Russia. Population: 6 (2010 census); 25 (2002 census);

== Geography ==
The village is located on the Vablya River (a tributary of the Prutishche in the basin of the Seym), 73 km from the Russia–Ukraine border, 54 km north-west of Kursk, 15 km north-east of the district center – the urban-type settlement Konyshyovka, 6 km from the selsoviet center – Maloye Gorodkovo.

Climate

Verkhnyaya Vablya has a warm-summer humid continental climate (Dfb in the Köppen climate classification).

== Transport ==
Verkhnyaya Vablya is located 67 km from the federal route M-3 Ukraine Highway, 30.5 km from the route M-2 Crimea Highway, 38 km from the route A-142 (Trosna – M3 highway), 17.5 km from the road of regional importance 38K-038 (Fatezh – Dmitriyev), 4.5 km from the road 38K-005 (Konyshyovka – Zhigayevo – 38K-038), 31 km from the road 38K-017 (Kursk – Lgov – Rylsk – border with Ukraine), 2 km from the road of intermunicipal significance 38Н-136 (38K-005 – Maloye Gorodkovo – Bolshoye Gorodkovo), 10.5 km from the nearest railway halt 552 km (railway line Navlya – Lgov-Kiyevsky).

The rural locality is situated 60 km from Kursk Vostochny Airport, 161 km from Belgorod International Airport and 260 km from Voronezh Peter the Great Airport.
