= Lipnitsa, Belyayevsky selsovet, Konyshyovsky District, Kursk Oblast =

Rural locality in Kursk Oblast, Russia

Lipnitsa Липница
- Khutor
- Interactive map of Lipnitsa
- Location of Lipnitsa Lipnitsa (Kursk Oblast)
- Coordinates: 51°52′20″N 35°01′47″E
- Country: Russia
- Federal subject: Kursk Oblast
- Administrative district: Konyshyovsky District
- SelsovietSelsoviet: Belyayevsky

Population (2010 Census)
  - Total: 0
  - Estimate (2010): 0 )

Municipal status
  - Municipal district: Konyshyovsky Municipal District
  - Rural settlement: Belyayevsky Selsoviet Rural Settlement
- Postal code: 307631
- Dialing code: +7 47156
- Website: беляевский.рф

Lipnitsa (Russian: Липница) is a rural locality (a khutor) in Belyayevsky Selsoviet Rural Settlement, Konyshyovsky District, Kursk Oblast, Russia. Population: 0 (2010 census); 7 (2002 census);

== Geography ==
The khutor is located on the Vandarets River (a left tributary of the Svapa River), 42.5 km from the Russia–Ukraine border, 81 km north-west of Kursk, 18 km north-west of the district center – the urban-type settlement Konyshyovka, 5.5 km from the selsoviet center – Belyayevo.

Climate

Lipnitsa has a warm-summer humid continental climate (Dfb in the Köppen climate classification).

== Transport ==
Lipnitsa is located 37.5 km from the federal route M-3 Ukraine Highway, 59 km from the route M-2 Crimea Highway, 26 km from the route A-142 (Trosna – M3 highway), 23 km from the road of regional importance 38K-038 (Fatezh – Dmitriyev), 18.5 km from the road 38K-005 (Konyshyovka – Zhigayevo – 38K-038), 10 km from the road 38K-003 (Dmitriyev – Beryoza – Menshikovo – Khomutovka), 16 km from the road 38K-023 (Lgov – Konyshyovka), 3.5 km from the road of intermunicipal significance 38Н-132 (Kashara – Gryady), 6 km from the road 38H-144 (Konyshyovka – Makaro-Petrovskoye, with the access road to the villages of Belyayevo and Chernicheno), 16 km from the nearest railway halt Grinyovka (railway line Navlya – Lgov-Kiyevsky).

The rural locality is situated 87.5 km from Kursk Vostochny Airport, 172 km from Belgorod International Airport and 289 km from Voronezh Peter the Great Airport.
