= Sosonki, Kursk Oblast =

Rural locality in Kursk Oblast, Russia

Sosonki Сосонки
- Village
- Interactive map of Sosonki
- Location of Sosonki Sosonki (Kursk Oblast)
- Coordinates: 51°53′18″N 35°17′26″E
- Country: Russia
- Federal subject: Kursk Oblast
- Administrative district: Konyshyovsky District
- SelsovietSelsoviet: Prilepsky

Population (2010 Census)
  - Total: 2
  - Estimate (2010): 2 (0%)

Municipal status
  - Municipal district: Konyshyovsky Municipal District
  - Rural settlement: Prilepsky Selsoviet Rural Settlement
- Time zone: UTC+3 (MSK)
- Postal code: 307605
- Dialing code: +7 47156
- OKTMO ID: 38616440106
- Website: prilepy.ru

Sosonki (Russian: Сосонки) is a rural locality (Russian: деревня, lit. 'village') in Prilepsky Selsoviet Rural Settlement, Konyshyovsky District, Kursk Oblast, Russia. Population: 2 (2010 census); 6 (2002 census);

== Geography ==
The village is located on the Platavka River (a left tributary of the Svapa River), 60.5 km from the Russia–Ukraine border, 64 km north-west of Kursk, 5 km north of the district center – the urban-type settlement Konyshyovka, 4 km from the selsoviet center – Prilepy.

Climate

Sosonki has a warm-summer humid continental climate (Dfb in the Köppen climate classification).

== Transport ==
Sosonki is located 42 km from the federal route M-2 Crimea Highway, 55 km from the route M-3 Ukraine Highway, 36 km from the route A-142 (Trosna – M3 highway), 20 km from the road of regional importance 38K-038 (Fatezh – Dmitriyev), 2 km from the road 38K-005 (Konyshyovka – Zhigayevo – 38K-038), 2 km from the nearest railway halt 552 km (railway line Navlya – Lgov-Kiyevsky).

The rural locality is situated 70 km from Kursk Vostochny Airport, 164 km from Belgorod International Airport and 272 km from Voronezh Peter the Great Airport.
