= Zavetensky =

Rural locality in Kursk Oblast, Russia

Zavetensky Заветенский
- Khutor
- Interactive map of Zavetensky
- Location of Zavetensky Zavetensky (Kursk Oblast)
- Coordinates: 51°48′20″N 35°14′06″E
- Country: Russia
- Federal subject: Kursk Oblast
- Administrative district: Konyshyovsky District
- SelsovietSelsoviet: Prilepsky

Population (2010 Census)
  - Total: 5
  - Estimate (2010): 5 (0%)

Municipal status
  - Municipal district: Konyshyovsky Municipal District
  - Rural settlement: Prilepsky Selsoviet Rural Settlement
- Time zone: UTC+3 (MSK)
- Postal code: 307636
- Dialing code: +7 47156
- OKTMO ID: 38616440126
- Website: prilepy.ru

Zavetensky (Russian: Заветенский) is a rural locality (a khutor) in Prilepsky Selsoviet Rural Settlement, Konyshyovsky District, Kursk Oblast, Russia. Population: 5 (2010 census); 30 (2002 census);

== Geography ==
The khutor is located on the Platavka River (a left tributary of the Svapa River), 55 km from the Russia–Ukraine border, 66.5 km west of Kursk, 6 km south-west of the district center – the urban-type settlement Konyshyovka, 6 km from the selsoviet center – Prilepy.

Climate

Zavetensky has a warm-summer humid continental climate (Dfb in the Köppen climate classification).

== Transport ==
Zavetensky is located 53 km from the federal route M-3 Ukraine Highway, 51.5 km from the route M-2 Crimea Highway, 41 km from the route A-142 (Trosna – M3 highway), 29 km from the road of regional importance 38K-038 (Fatezh – Dmitriyev), 5 km from the road 38K-005 (Konyshyovka – Zhigayevo – 38K-038), on the road 38K-023 (Lgov – Konyshyovka), 5 km from the nearest railway halt 565 km (railway line Navlya – Lgov-Kiyevsky).

The rural locality is situated 72.5 km from Kursk Vostochny Airport, 158 km from Belgorod International Airport and 275 km from Voronezh Peter the Great Airport.
