= Yandovishche, Kursk Oblast =

Rural locality in Kursk Oblast, Russia

Yandovishche Яндовище
- Selo
- Interactive map of Yandovishche
- Location of Yandovishche Yandovishche (Kursk Oblast)
- Coordinates: 52°00′00″N 35°20′26″E
- Country: Russia
- Federal subject: Kursk Oblast
- Administrative district: Konyshyovsky District
- SelsovietSelsoviet: Mashkinsky

Population (2010 Census)
  - Total: 29
  - Estimate (2010): 29 (0%)

Municipal status
  - Municipal district: Konyshyovsky Municipal District
  - Rural settlement: Mashkinsky Selsoviet Rural Settlement
- Time zone: UTC+3 (MSK)
- Postal code: 307611
- Dialing code: +7 47156
- OKTMO ID: 38616428136
- Website: машкинский.рф

Yandovishche (Russian: Яндовище) is a rural locality (Russian: село, lit. 'village') in Mashkinsky Selsoviet Rural Settlement, Konyshyovsky District, Kursk Oblast, Russia. Population: 29 (2010 census); 62 (2002 census);

== Geography ==
The village is located on the Lipovy Kolodez Brook (a tributary of the Belichka in the basin of the Svapa River), 67 km from the Russia–Ukraine border, 65 km north-west of Kursk, 18 km north-east of the district center – the urban-type settlement Konyshyovka, 5.5 km from the selsoviet center – Mashkino.

Climate

Yandovishche has a warm-summer humid continental climate (Dfb in the Köppen climate classification).

Climate data for Yandovishche
| Month | Jan | Feb | Mar | Apr | May | Jun | Jul | Aug | Sep | Oct | Nov | Dec | Year |
|---|---|---|---|---|---|---|---|---|---|---|---|---|---|
| Mean daily maximum °C (°F) | −4.1 (24.6) | −3.2 (26.2) | 2.6 (36.7) | 12.8 (55.0) | 19.1 (66.4) | 22.4 (72.3) | 24.9 (76.8) | 24.2 (75.6) | 17.9 (64.2) | 10.3 (50.5) | 3.3 (37.9) | −1.2 (29.8) | 10.8 (51.3) |
| Daily mean °C (°F) | −6.1 (21.0) | −5.6 (21.9) | −0.9 (30.4) | 8 (46) | 14.5 (58.1) | 18.1 (64.6) | 20.6 (69.1) | 19.7 (67.5) | 13.8 (56.8) | 7.1 (44.8) | 1.1 (34.0) | −3.1 (26.4) | 7.3 (45.1) |
| Mean daily minimum °C (°F) | −8.5 (16.7) | −8.6 (16.5) | −4.9 (23.2) | 2.6 (36.7) | 8.9 (48.0) | 12.8 (55.0) | 15.7 (60.3) | 14.6 (58.3) | 9.6 (49.3) | 3.9 (39.0) | −1.1 (30.0) | −5.3 (22.5) | 3.3 (38.0) |
| Average precipitation mm (inches) | 51 (2.0) | 45 (1.8) | 47 (1.9) | 51 (2.0) | 63 (2.5) | 70 (2.8) | 80 (3.1) | 56 (2.2) | 59 (2.3) | 58 (2.3) | 49 (1.9) | 50 (2.0) | 679 (26.8) |
Source: https://en.climate-data.org/asia/russian-federation/kursk-oblast/яндовище-661941/

== Transport ==
Yandovishche is located 58.5 km from the federal route M-3 Ukraine Highway, 33.5 km from the route M-2 Crimea Highway, 26 km from the route A-142 (Trosna – M3 highway), 9.5 km from the road of regional importance 38K-038 (Fatezh – Dmitriyev), 4 km from the road 38K-005 (Konyshyovka – Zhigayevo – 38K-038), on the road of intermunicipal significance 38Н-140 (38K-005 – Marmyzhi – Mashkino), 8 km from the nearest railway station Sokovninka (railway line Navlya – Lgov-Kiyevsky).

The rural locality is situated 70 km from Kursk Vostochny Airport, 172 km from Belgorod International Airport and 268 km from Voronezh Peter the Great Airport.
