= Yakovlevo, Konyshyovsky District, Kursk Oblast =

Rural locality in Kursk Oblast, Russia

Yakovlevo Яковлево
- Village
- Interactive map of Yakovlevo
- Location of Yakovlevo Yakovlevo (Kursk Oblast)
- Coordinates: 51°51′56″N 35°30′36″E
- Country: Russia
- Federal subject: Kursk Oblast
- Administrative district: Konyshyovsky District
- SelsovietSelsoviet: Malogorodkovsky

Population (2010 Census)
  - Total: 16
  - Estimate (2010): 16 (0%)

Municipal status
  - Municipal district: Konyshyovsky Municipal District
  - Rural settlement: Malogorodkovsky Selsoviet Rural Settlement
- Time zone: UTC+3 (MSK)
- Postal code: 307624
- Dialing code: +7 47156
- OKTMO ID: 38616426166
- Website: malogorod.rkursk.ru

Yakovlevo (Russian: Яковлево) is a rural locality (Russian: деревня, lit. 'village') in Malogorodkovsky Selsoviet Rural Settlement, Konyshyovsky District, Kursk Oblast, Russia. Population: 16 (2010 census); 40 (2002 census);

== Geography ==
The village is located on the Gorodkov Brook (a tributary of the Prutishche in the basin of the Seym), 75 km from the Russia–Ukraine border, 49 km north-west of Kursk, 15 km north-east of the district center – the urban-type settlement Konyshyovka, 4 km from the selsoviet center – Maloye Gorodkovo.

Climate

Yakovlevo has a warm-summer humid continental climate (Dfb in the Köppen climate classification).

Climate data for Yakovlevo
Month	Jan	Feb	Mar	Apr	May	Jun	Jul	Aug	Sep	Oct	Nov	Dec	Year
Mean daily maximum °C (°F)	−4.2 (24.4)	−3.2 (26.2)	2.5 (36.5)	12.7 (54.9)	19 (66)	22.3 (72.1)	24.9 (76.8)	24.1 (75.4)	17.8 (64.0)	10.3 (50.5)	3.3 (37.9)	−1.3 (29.7)	10.7 (51.2)
Daily mean °C (°F)	−6.2 (20.8)	−5.7 (21.7)	−1 (30)	7.9 (46.2)	14.4 (57.9)	18 (64)	20.6 (69.1)	19.6 (67.3)	13.7 (56.7)	7.1 (44.8)	1.1 (34.0)	−3.2 (26.2)	7.2 (44.9)
Mean daily minimum °C (°F)	−8.6 (16.5)	−8.7 (16.3)	−5 (23)	2.5 (36.5)	8.9 (48.0)	12.7 (54.9)	15.6 (60.1)	14.6 (58.3)	9.5 (49.1)	3.8 (38.8)	−1.2 (29.8)	−5.3 (22.5)	3.2 (37.8)
Average precipitation mm (inches)	51 (2.0)	45 (1.8)	48 (1.9)	51 (2.0)	63 (2.5)	71 (2.8)	76 (3.0)	55 (2.2)	58 (2.3)	58 (2.3)	48 (1.9)	49 (1.9)	673 (26.6)
Source: https://en.climate-data.org/asia/russian-federation/kursk-oblast/яковлево-662739/

== Transport ==
Yakovlevo is located 70.5 km from the federal route M-3 Ukraine Highway, 31.5 km from the route M-2 Crimea Highway, 45 km from the route A-142 (Trosna – M3 highway), 23.5 km from the road of regional importance 38K-038 (Fatezh – Dmitriyev), 13 km from the road 38K-005 (Konyshyovka – Zhigayevo – 38K-038), 24 km from the road 38K-017 (Kursk – Lgov – Rylsk – border with Ukraine), 4 km from the road of intermunicipal significance 38Н-136 (38K-005 – Maloye Gorodkovo – Bolshoye Gorodkovo), on the road 38Н-139 (38N-136 – Yakovlevo), 14 km from the nearest railway halt 552 km (railway line Navlya – Lgov-Kiyevsky).

The rural locality is situated 54.5 km from Kursk Vostochny Airport, 154 km from Belgorod International Airport and 256 km from Voronezh Peter the Great Airport.
