= Tolkachyovka, Kursk Oblast =

Rural locality in Kursk Oblast, Russia

Tolkachyovka Толкачёвка
- Selo
- Interactive map of Tolkachyovka
- Location of Tolkachyovka Tolkachyovka (Kursk Oblast)
- Coordinates: 51°49′25″N 35°14′18″E
- Country: Russia
- Federal subject: Kursk Oblast
- Administrative district: Konyshyovsky District
- SelsovietSelsoviet: Prilepsky

Population (2010 Census)
  - Total: 346
  - Estimate (2010): 346 (0%)

Municipal status
  - Municipal district: Konyshyovsky Municipal District
  - Rural settlement: Prilepsky Selsoviet Rural Settlement
- Time zone: UTC+3 (MSK)
- Postal code: 307605
- Dialing code: +7 47156
- OKTMO ID: 38616440111
- Website: prilepy.ru

Tolkachyovka (Russian: Толкачёвка) is a rural locality (Russian: село, lit. 'village') in Prilepsky Selsoviet Rural Settlement, Konyshyovsky District, Kursk Oblast, Russia. Population: 346 (2010 census); 453 (2002 census);

== Geography ==
The village is located on the Platavka River (a left tributary of the Svapa River), 56 km from the Russia–Ukraine border, 66.5 km north-west of Kursk, 4.5 km south-west of the district center – the urban-type settlement Konyshyovka, 4 km from the selsoviet center – Prilepy.

Climate

Tolkachyovka has a warm-summer humid continental climate (Dfb in the Köppen climate classification).

== Transport ==
Tolkachyovka is located 52.5 km from the federal route M-3 Ukraine Highway, 50 km from the route M-2 Crimea Highway, 39 km from the route A-142 (Trosna – M3 highway), 27 km from the road of regional importance 38K-038 (Fatezh – Dmitriyev), 3 km from the road 38K-005 (Konyshyovka – Zhigayevo – 38K-038), 0.5 km from the road 38K-023 (Lgov – Konyshyovka), on the road of intermunicipal significance 38Н-438 (38K-023 – Tolkachyovka – Prilepy), 4 km from the nearest railway station Konyshyovka (railway line Navlya – Lgov-Kiyevsky).

The rural locality is situated 73 km from Kursk Vostochny Airport, 160 km from Belgorod International Airport and 275 km from Voronezh Peter the Great Airport.
