= Pervomaysky, Konyshyovsky District, Kursk Oblast =

Rural locality in Kursk Oblast, Russia

Pervomaysky Первомайский
- Khutor
- Interactive map of Pervomaysky
- Location of Pervomaysky Pervomaysky (Kursk Oblast)
- Coordinates: 51°55′37″N 35°00′59″E
- Country: Russia
- Federal subject: Kursk Oblast
- Administrative district: Konyshyovsky District
- SelsovietSelsoviet: Naumovsky

Population (2010 Census)
  - Total: 14
  - Estimate (2010): 14 (0%)

Municipal status
  - Municipal district: Konyshyovsky Municipal District
  - Rural settlement: Naumovsky Selsoviet Rural Settlement
- Time zone: UTC+3 (MSK)
- Postal code: 307601
- Dialing code: +7 47156
- OKTMO ID: 38616432116
- Website: naumovsky.ru

Pervomaysky (Russian: Первомайский) is a rural locality (a khutor) in Naumovsky Selsoviet Rural Settlement, Konyshyovsky District, Kursk Oblast, Russia. Population: 14 (2010 census); 29 (2002 census);

== Geography ==
The khutor is located on the Svapa River (a right tributary of the Seym River), 43 km from the Russia–Ukraine border, 83 km north-west of Kursk, 21 km north-west of the district center – the urban-type settlement Konyshyovka, 10 km from the selsoviet center – Naumovka.

Climate

Pervomaysky has a warm-summer humid continental climate (Dfb in the Köppen climate classification).

== Transport ==
Pervomaysky is located 36 km from the federal route M-3 Ukraine Highway, 58 km from the route M-2 Crimea Highway, 20.5 km from the route A-142 (Trosna – M3 highway), 18 km from the road of regional importance 38K-038 (Fatezh – Dmitriyev), 21 km from the road 38K-005 (Konyshyovka – Zhigayevo – 38K-038), 4.5 km from the road 38K-003 (Dmitriyev – Beryoza – Menshikovo – Khomutovka), on the road of intermunicipal significance 38H-462 (Makaro-Petrovskoye – Pervomaysky), 12 km from the nearest railway halt 536 km (railway line Navlya – Lgov-Kiyevsky).

The rural locality is situated 90 km from Kursk Vostochny Airport, 178 km from Belgorod International Airport and 290 km from Voronezh Peter the Great Airport.
