= Bogatyr, Kursk Oblast =

Rural locality in Kursk Oblast, Russia

Bogatyr Богатырь
- Khutor
- Interactive map of Bogatyr
- Location of Bogatyr Bogatyr (Kursk Oblast)
- Coordinates: 51°51′49″N 35°02′34″E
- Country: Russia
- Federal subject: Kursk Oblast
- Administrative district: Konyshyovsky District
- SelsovietSelsoviet: Belyayevsky

Population (2010 Census)
  - Total: 0
  - Estimate (2010): 0 )

Municipal status
  - Municipal district: Konyshyovsky Municipal District
  - Rural settlement: Belyayevsky Selsoviet Rural Settlement
- Time zone: UTC+3 (MSK)
- Postal code: 307631
- Dialing code: +7 47156
- OKTMO ID: 38616404106

Bogatyr (Russian: Богатырь) is a rural locality (a khutor) in Belyayevsky Selsoviet Rural Settlement, Konyshyovsky District, Kursk Oblast, Russia.

Population: 0 (2010 census); 9 (2002 census); about 20 (1981); 10 (1935-1941). In 2002, all the residents were Russians.

== Geography ==
The khutor is located in the Vandarets River basin (a left tributary of the Svapa River), 43 km from the Russia–Ukraine border, 80 km north-west of Kursk, 17 km north-west of the district center – the urban-type settlement Konyshyovka, 4.5 km from the selsoviet center – Belyayevo.

Climate

Bogatyr has a warm-summer humid continental climate (Dfb in the Köppen climate classification).

== Transport ==
Bogatyr is located 39 km from the federal route M-3 Ukraine Highway, 59 km from the route M-2 Crimea Highway, 27.5 km from the route A-142 (Trosna – M3 highway), 24 km from the road of regional importance 38K-038 (Fatezh – Dmitriyev), 18 km from the road 38K-005 (Konyshyovka – Zhigayevo – 38K-038), 12 km from the road 38K-003 (Dmitriyev – Beryoza – Menshikovo – Khomutovka), 15 km from the road 38K-023 (Lgov – Konyshyovka), 3 km from the road of intermunicipal significance 38Н-132 (Kashara – Gryady), 5.5 km from the road 38H-144 (Konyshyovka – Makaro-Petrovskoye, with the access road to the villages of Belyayevo and Chernicheno), 16 km from the nearest railway halt Grinyovka (railway line Navlya – Lgov-Kiyevsky).

The rural locality is situated 86.5 km from Kursk Vostochny Airport, 172 km from Belgorod International Airport and 289 km from Voronezh Peter the Great Airport.
