= Glazovo, Kursk Oblast =

Rural locality in Kursk Oblast, Russia

Glazovo Глазово
- Selo
- Interactive map of Glazovo
- Location of Glazovo Glazovo (Kursk Oblast)
- Coordinates: 51°54′19″N 35°27′45″E
- Country: Russia
- Federal subject: Kursk Oblast
- Administrative district: Konyshyovsky District
- SelsovietSelsoviet: Malogorodkovsky

Population (2010 Census)
  - Total: 133
  - Estimate (2010): 133 (0%)

Municipal status
  - Municipal district: Konyshyovsky Municipal District
  - Rural settlement: Malogorodkovsky Selsoviet Rural Settlement
- Time zone: UTC+3 (MSK)
- Postal code: 307623
- Dialing code: +7 47156
- OKTMO ID: 38616426101
- Website: malogorod.rkursk.ru

Glazovo (Russian: Глазово) is a rural locality (Russian: село, lit. 'village') in Malogorodkovsky Selsoviet Rural Settlement, Konyshyovsky District, Kursk Oblast, Russia. Population: 133 (2010 census); 170 (2002 census);

== Geography ==
The village is located on the Vablya River (a tributary of the Prutishche in the basin of the Seym), 72.5 km from the Russia–Ukraine border, 54 km north-west of Kursk, 13.5 km north-east of the district center – the urban-type settlement Konyshyovka, 5.5 km from the selsoviet center – Maloye Gorodkovo.

Climate

Glazovo has a warm-summer humid continental climate (Dfb in the Köppen climate classification).

Climate data for Glazovo
Month	Jan	Feb	Mar	Apr	May	Jun	Jul	Aug	Sep	Oct	Nov	Dec	Year
Mean daily maximum °C (°F)	−4.2 (24.4)	−3.2 (26.2)	2.5 (36.5)	12.7 (54.9)	19 (66)	22.3 (72.1)	24.9 (76.8)	24.1 (75.4)	17.8 (64.0)	10.3 (50.5)	3.3 (37.9)	−1.3 (29.7)	10.7 (51.2)
Daily mean °C (°F)	−6.2 (20.8)	−5.7 (21.7)	−1 (30)	7.9 (46.2)	14.4 (57.9)	18 (64)	20.6 (69.1)	19.6 (67.3)	13.7 (56.7)	7.1 (44.8)	1.1 (34.0)	−3.2 (26.2)	7.2 (44.9)
Mean daily minimum °C (°F)	−8.6 (16.5)	−8.7 (16.3)	−5 (23)	2.5 (36.5)	8.9 (48.0)	12.7 (54.9)	15.6 (60.1)	14.6 (58.3)	9.5 (49.1)	3.8 (38.8)	−1.2 (29.8)	−5.3 (22.5)	3.2 (37.8)
Average precipitation mm (inches)	51 (2.0)	45 (1.8)	47 (1.9)	51 (2.0)	62 (2.4)	72 (2.8)	78 (3.1)	56 (2.2)	59 (2.3)	58 (2.3)	48 (1.9)	50 (2.0)	677 (26.7)
Source: https://en.climate-data.org/asia/russian-federation/kursk-oblast/glazovo-661233/

== Transport ==
Glazovo is located 67 km from the federal route M-3 Ukraine Highway, 31.5 km from the route M-2 Crimea Highway, 40 km from the route A-142 (Trosna – M3 highway), 19.5 km from the road of regional importance 38K-038 (Fatezh – Dmitriyev), 6.5 km from the road 38K-005 (Konyshyovka – Zhigayevo – 38K-038), 30 km from the road 38K-017 (Kursk – Lgov – Rylsk – border with Ukraine), on the road of intermunicipal significance 38Н-136 (38K-005 – Maloye Gorodkovo – Bolshoye Gorodkovo), 10.5 km from the nearest railway halt 552 km (railway line Navlya – Lgov-Kiyevsky).

The rural locality is situated 59 km from Kursk Vostochny Airport, 159 km from Belgorod International Airport and 259 km from Voronezh Peter the Great Airport.
