= Novosyolovka, Konyshyovsky District, Kursk Oblast =

Rural locality in Kursk Oblast, Russia

Novosyolovka Новосёловка
- Village
- Interactive map of Novosyolovka
- Location of Novosyolovka Novosyolovka (Kursk Oblast)
- Coordinates: 51°45′30″N 35°07′15″E
- Country: Russia
- Federal subject: Kursk Oblast
- Administrative district: Konyshyovsky District
- SelsovietSelsoviet: Platavsky

Population (2010 Census)
  - Total: 0
  - Estimate (2010): 0 )

Municipal status
  - Municipal district: Konyshyovsky Municipal District
  - Rural settlement: Platavsky Selsoviet Rural Settlement
- Time zone: UTC+3 (MSK)
- Postal code: 307635
- Dialing code: +7 47156
- OKTMO ID: 38616436151
- Website: platavskii.ru

Novosyolovka (Russian: Новосёловка) is a rural locality (Russian: деревня, lit. 'village') in Platavsky Selsoviet Rural Settlement, Konyshyovsky District, Kursk Oblast, Russia. Population: 0 (2010 census); 17 (2002 census);

== Geography ==
The village is located on the Prutishche River in the basin of the Seym, 47 km from the Russia–Ukraine border, 74 km west of Kursk, 15 km south-west of the district center – the urban-type settlement Konyshyovka, 9.5 km from the selsoviet center – Kashara.

Climate

Novosyolovka has a warm-summer humid continental climate (Dfb in the Köppen climate classification).

== Transport ==
Novosyolovka is located 47 km from the federal route M-3 Ukraine Highway, 60 km from the route M-2 Crimea Highway, 40 km from the route A-142 (Trosna – M3 highway), 34 km from the road of regional importance 38K-038 (Fatezh – Dmitriyev), 14.5 km from the road 38K-005 (Konyshyovka – Zhigayevo – 38K-038), 14 km from the road 38K-017 (Kursk – Lgov – Rylsk – border with Ukraine), 7.5 km from the road 38K-023 (Lgov – Konyshyovka), on the road of intermunicipal significance 38Н-734 (Shustovo – Novosyolovka), 9.5 km from the nearest railway halt Maritsa (railway line Navlya – Lgov-Kiyevsky).

The rural locality is situated 80 km from Kursk Vostochny Airport, 159 km from Belgorod International Airport and 283 km from Voronezh Peter the Great Airport.
