= Pankeyevo =

Rural locality in Kursk Oblast, Russia

Pankeyevo Панкеево
- Village
- Interactive map of Pankeyevo
- Location of Pankeyevo Pankeyevo (Kursk Oblast)
- Coordinates: 51°47′10″N 35°23′34″E
- Country: Russia
- Federal subject: Kursk Oblast
- Administrative district: Konyshyovsky District
- SelsovietSelsoviet: Zakharkovsky

Population (2010 Census)
  - Total: 17
  - Estimate (2010): 17 (0%)

Municipal status
  - Municipal district: Konyshyovsky Municipal District
  - Rural settlement: Zakharkovsky Selsoviet Rural Settlement
- Time zone: UTC+3 (MSK)
- Postal code: 307627
- Dialing code: +7 47156
- OKTMO ID: 38616420111
- Website: захарковский46.рф

Pankeyevo (Russian: Панкеево) is a rural locality (Russian: деревня, lit. 'village') in Zakharkovsky Selsoviet Rural Settlement, Konyshyovsky District, Kursk Oblast, Russia. Population: 17 (2010 census); 46 (2002 census);

== Geography ==
The village is located on the Prutishche River and on its tributary Vablya River in the basin of the Seym, 66 km from the Russia–Ukraine border, 55.5 km north-west of Kursk, 9.5 km south-east of the district center – the urban-type settlement Konyshyovka, 11 km from the selsoviet center – Zakharkovo.

Climate

Pankeyevo has a warm-summer humid continental climate (Dfb in the Köppen climate classification).

Climate data for Pankeyevo
Month	Jan	Feb	Mar	Apr	May	Jun	Jul	Aug	Sep	Oct	Nov	Dec	Year
Mean daily maximum °C (°F)	−4 (25)	−3 (27)	2.8 (37.0)	12.9 (55.2)	19.2 (66.6)	22.5 (72.5)	25 (77)	24.4 (75.9)	18 (64)	10.5 (50.9)	3.4 (38.1)	−1.1 (30.0)	10.9 (51.6)
Daily mean °C (°F)	−6.1 (21.0)	−5.5 (22.1)	−0.8 (30.6)	8.1 (46.6)	14.6 (58.3)	18.2 (64.8)	20.7 (69.3)	19.8 (67.6)	13.9 (57.0)	7.2 (45.0)	1.2 (34.2)	−3.1 (26.4)	7.4 (45.2)
Mean daily minimum °C (°F)	−8.5 (16.7)	−8.6 (16.5)	−4.9 (23.2)	2.7 (36.9)	9 (48)	12.9 (55.2)	15.7 (60.3)	14.7 (58.5)	9.7 (49.5)	3.9 (39.0)	−1.1 (30.0)	−5.2 (22.6)	3.4 (38.0)
Average precipitation mm (inches)	51 (2.0)	45 (1.8)	48 (1.9)	51 (2.0)	63 (2.5)	71 (2.8)	76 (3.0)	55 (2.2)	58 (2.3)	58 (2.3)	48 (1.9)	49 (1.9)	673 (26.6)
Source: https://en.climate-data.org/asia/russian-federation/kursk-oblast/pankeyevo-654274/

== Transport ==
Pankeyevo is located 64 km from the federal route M-3 Ukraine Highway, 44 km from the route M-2 Crimea Highway, 49 km from the route A-142 (Trosna – M3 highway), 32.5 km from the road of regional importance 38K-038 (Fatezh – Dmitriyev), 9 km from the road 38K-023 (Lgov – Konyshyovka), 18 km from the road 38K-017 (Kursk – Lgov – Rylsk – border with Ukraine), 11.5 km from the road of intermunicipal significance 38H-362 (38K-017 – Nikolayevka – Shirkovo), 1 km from the road 38H-437 (38K-023 – Olshanka – Marmyzhi – 38N-362), 6 km from the nearest railway halt 565 km (railway line Navlya – Lgov-Kiyevsky).

The rural locality is situated 61 km from Kursk Vostochny Airport, 150 km from Belgorod International Airport and 264 km from Voronezh Peter the Great Airport.
