= Pavlovka, Konyshyovsky District, Kursk Oblast =

Rural locality in Kursk Oblast, Russia

Pavlovka Павловка
- Village
- Interactive map of Pavlovka
- Location of Pavlovka Pavlovka (Kursk Oblast)
- Coordinates: 51°48′58″N 35°26′38″E
- Country: Russia
- Federal subject: Kursk Oblast
- Administrative district: Konyshyovsky District
- SelsovietSelsoviet: Malogorodkovsky

Population (2010 Census)
  - Total: 19
  - Estimate (2010): 19 (0%)

Municipal status
  - Municipal district: Konyshyovsky Municipal District
  - Rural settlement: Malogorodkovsky Selsoviet Rural Settlement
- Time zone: UTC+3 (MSK)
- Postal code: 307623
- Dialing code: +7 47156
- OKTMO ID: 38616426136
- Website: malogorod.rkursk.ru

Pavlovka (Russian: Павловка) is a rural locality (Russian: деревня, lit. 'village') in Malogorodkovsky Selsoviet Rural Settlement, Konyshyovsky District, Kursk Oblast, Russia. Population: 19 (2010 census); 26 (2002 census);

== Geography ==
The village is located on the Prutishche River in the basin of the Seym, 70 km from the Russia–Ukraine border, 52 km north-west of Kursk, 11 km south-east of the district center – the urban-type settlement Konyshyovka, 11 km from the selsoviet center – Maloye Gorodkovo.

Climate

Pavlovka has a warm-summer humid continental climate (Dfb in the Köppen climate classification).

== Transport ==
Pavlovka is located 67 km from the federal route M-3 Ukraine Highway, 38.5 km from the route M-2 Crimea Highway, 49.5 km from the route A-142 (Trosna – M3 highway), 29.5 km from the road of regional importance 38K-038 (Fatezh – Dmitriyev), 10 km from the road 38K-005 (Konyshyovka – Zhigayevo – 38K-038), 21 km from the road 38K-017 (Kursk – Lgov – Rylsk – border with Ukraine), 7 km from the road of intermunicipal significance 38Н-136 (38K-005 – Maloye Gorodkovo – Bolshoye Gorodkovo), on the road 38Н-138 (38N-136 – Ozerovka – Yuryevka – Pavlovka), 10 km from the nearest railway halt 565 km (railway line Navlya – Lgov-Kiyevsky).

The rural locality is situated 58 km from Kursk Vostochny Airport, 151 km from Belgorod International Airport and 261 km from Voronezh Peter the Great Airport.
