= Gryady, Kursk Oblast =

Rural locality in Kursk Oblast, Russia

Gryady Гряды
- Village
- Interactive map of Gryady
- Location of Gryady Gryady (Kursk Oblast)
- Coordinates: 51°48′33″N 34°59′07″E
- Country: Russia
- Federal subject: Kursk Oblast
- Administrative district: Konyshyovsky District
- SelsovietSelsoviet: Platavsky

Population (2010 Census)
  - Total: 72
  - Estimate (2010): 72 (0%)

Municipal status
  - Municipal district: Konyshyovsky Municipal District
  - Rural settlement: Platavsky Selsoviet Rural Settlement
- Time zone: UTC+3 (MSK)
- Postal code: 307634
- Dialing code: +7 47156
- OKTMO ID: 38616436106
- Website: platavskii.ru

Gryady (Russian: Гряды) is a rural locality (Russian: деревня, lit. 'village') in Platavsky Selsoviet Rural Settlement, Konyshyovsky District, Kursk Oblast, Russia. Population: 72 (2010 census); 109 (2002 census);

== Geography ==
The village is located on the Suzhavitsa River (a left tributary of the Svapa River), 38 km from the Russia–Ukraine border, 83 km west of Kursk, 21 km south-west of the district center – the urban-type settlement Konyshyovka, 7 km from the selsoviet center – Kashara.

Climate

Gryady has a warm-summer humid continental climate (Dfb in the Köppen climate classification).

Climate data for Gryady
| Month | Jan | Feb | Mar | Apr | May | Jun | Jul | Aug | Sep | Oct | Nov | Dec | Year |
|---|---|---|---|---|---|---|---|---|---|---|---|---|---|
| Mean daily maximum °C (°F) | −3.7 (25.3) | −2.7 (27.1) | 3.2 (37.8) | 13.2 (55.8) | 19.5 (67.1) | 22.8 (73.0) | 25.3 (77.5) | 24.6 (76.3) | 18.3 (64.9) | 10.7 (51.3) | 3.6 (38.5) | −0.9 (30.4) | 11.2 (52.1) |
| Daily mean °C (°F) | −5.8 (21.6) | −5.3 (22.5) | −0.4 (31.3) | 8.4 (47.1) | 14.8 (58.6) | 18.5 (65.3) | 20.9 (69.6) | 20 (68) | 14.1 (57.4) | 7.4 (45.3) | 1.4 (34.5) | −2.8 (27.0) | 7.6 (45.7) |
| Mean daily minimum °C (°F) | −8.2 (17.2) | −8.4 (16.9) | −4.5 (23.9) | 3 (37) | 9.2 (48.6) | 13.2 (55.8) | 15.9 (60.6) | 14.9 (58.8) | 9.9 (49.8) | 4.1 (39.4) | −0.8 (30.6) | −5 (23) | 3.6 (38.5) |
| Average precipitation mm (inches) | 49 (1.9) | 44 (1.7) | 48 (1.9) | 50 (2.0) | 64 (2.5) | 70 (2.8) | 79 (3.1) | 54 (2.1) | 57 (2.2) | 56 (2.2) | 48 (1.9) | 48 (1.9) | 667 (26.2) |
Source: https://en.climate-data.org/asia/russian-federation/kursk-oblast/гряды-660898/

== Transport ==
Gryady is located 36.5 km from the federal route M-3 Ukraine Highway, 65 km from the route M-2 Crimea Highway, 29.5 km from the route A-142 (Trosna – M3 highway), 31 km from the road of regional importance 38K-038 (Fatezh – Dmitriyev), 21.5 km from the road 38K-005 (Konyshyovka – Zhigayevo – 38K-038), 12 km from the road 38K-003 (Dmitriyev – Beryoza – Menshikovo – Khomutovka), 17 km from the road 38K-023 (Lgov – Konyshyovka), on the road of intermunicipal significance 38Н-132 (Kashara – Gryady), 19.5 km from the nearest railway halt Maritsa (railway line Navlya – Lgov-Kiyevsky).

The rural locality is situated 90 km from Kursk Vostochny Airport, 170 km from Belgorod International Airport and 292 km from Voronezh Peter the Great Airport.
