= Bogatyr (disambiguation) =

A bogatyr is a folk or epic hero in East Slavic culture.

Bogatyr may also refer to:

== Art and entertainment ==
- The Bogatyr, a decorative oil on canvas panel painted by Mikhail Vrubel in 1898
- Bogatyrs, an 1898 painting by Viktor Vasnetsov
- T-39 Bogatyr, a part of the video game Battlefield 2142
- Bogatyri (comics), a fictional team of Russian superheroes published by Marvel Comics

== Places ==
- Bogatyr, Kursk Oblast, a settlement in Russia
- Bogatyr (Pavlodar Region), village in Kazakhstan
- Bogatyr Ridge, a stratovolcano in the central part of Iturup Island, Kuril Islands, Russia
- The Russian-language name of Bahatyr, Ukraine

== Other uses ==
- Bogatyr class cruiser, class of cruisers, Imperial Russian Navy
- Russian cruiser Bogatyr, the lead ship of the Bogatyr class
- Bogatyr Coal, coal mining company in Kazakhstan
- Bogatyr battalion, a battalion formed in Qajar Iran made up of Russian deserters
