= Prilepy, Konyshyovsky District, Kursk Oblast =

Rural locality in Russia

Prilepy Прилепы
- Village
- Interactive map of Prilepy
- Location of Prilepy Prilepy (Kursk Oblast)
- Coordinates: 51°50′42″N 35°15′20″E
- Country: Russia
- Federal subject: Kursk Oblast
- Administrative district: Konyshyovsky District
- SelsovietSelsoviet: Prilepsky

Population (2010 Census)
  - Total: 584
  - Estimate (2010): 584 (0%)

Administrative status
  - Capital of: Prilepsky Selsoviet

Municipal status
  - Municipal district: Konyshyovsky Municipal District
  - Rural settlement: Prilepsky Selsoviet Rural Settlement
  - Capital of: Prilepsky Selsoviet Rural Settlement
- Time zone: UTC+3 (MSK)
- Postal code: 307605
- Dialing code: +7 47156
- OKTMO ID: 38616440101
- Website: prilepy.ru

Prilepy (Russian: Прилепы) is a rural locality (Russian: деревня, lit. 'village') and the administrative center of Prilepsky Selsoviet Rural Settlement, Konyshyovsky District, Kursk Oblast, Russia. Population: 584 (2010 census); 685 (2002 census);

== Geography ==
The village is located on the Platavka River (a left tributary of the Svapa River), 57 km from the Russia–Ukraine border, 65 km north-west of Kursk, 1 km north-west of the district center – the urban-type settlement Konyshyovka.

Climate

Prilepy has a warm-summer humid continental climate (Dfb in the Köppen climate classification).

Climate data for Prilepy
Month	Jan	Feb	Mar	Apr	May	Jun	Jul	Aug	Sep	Oct	Nov	Dec	Year
Mean daily maximum °C (°F)	−3.9 (25.0)	−2.9 (26.8)	3 (37)	13.1 (55.6)	19.4 (66.9)	22.7 (72.9)	25.2 (77.4)	24.5 (76.1)	18.2 (64.8)	10.6 (51.1)	3.5 (38.3)	−1 (30)	11.0 (51.8)
Daily mean °C (°F)	−5.9 (21.4)	−5.4 (22.3)	−0.6 (30.9)	8.3 (46.9)	14.7 (58.5)	18.4 (65.1)	20.9 (69.6)	19.9 (67.8)	14 (57)	7.3 (45.1)	1.3 (34.3)	−2.9 (26.8)	7.5 (45.5)
Mean daily minimum °C (°F)	−8.3 (17.1)	−8.5 (16.7)	−4.6 (23.7)	2.9 (37.2)	9.1 (48.4)	13.1 (55.6)	15.9 (60.6)	14.8 (58.6)	9.8 (49.6)	4.1 (39.4)	−0.9 (30.4)	−5.1 (22.8)	3.5 (38.3)
Average precipitation mm (inches)	50 (2.0)	44 (1.7)	48 (1.9)	50 (2.0)	63 (2.5)	71 (2.8)	77 (3.0)	54 (2.1)	57 (2.2)	57 (2.2)	48 (1.9)	49 (1.9)	668 (26.2)
Source: https://en.climate-data.org/asia/russian-federation/kursk-oblast/prilepy-661234/

== Transport ==
Prilepy is located 47 km from the federal route M-2 Crimea Highway, 24 km from the road of regional importance 38K-038 (Fatezh – Dmitriyev), 1 km from the roads 38K-005 (Konyshyovka – Zhigayevo – 38K-038) and 38K-023 (Lgov – Konyshyovka), on the road of intermunicipal significance 38H-144 (Konyshyovka – Makaro-Petrovskoye with the access road to the villages of Belyaevo and Chernicheno), 2 km from the nearest railway station Konyshyovka (railway line Navlya – Lgov-Kiyevsky).

The rural locality is situated 71.5 km from Kursk Vostochny Airport, 161 km from Belgorod International Airport and 274 km from Voronezh Peter the Great Airport.
