= Trosnyansky District =

Trosnyansky District Троснянский район (Russian)
- District
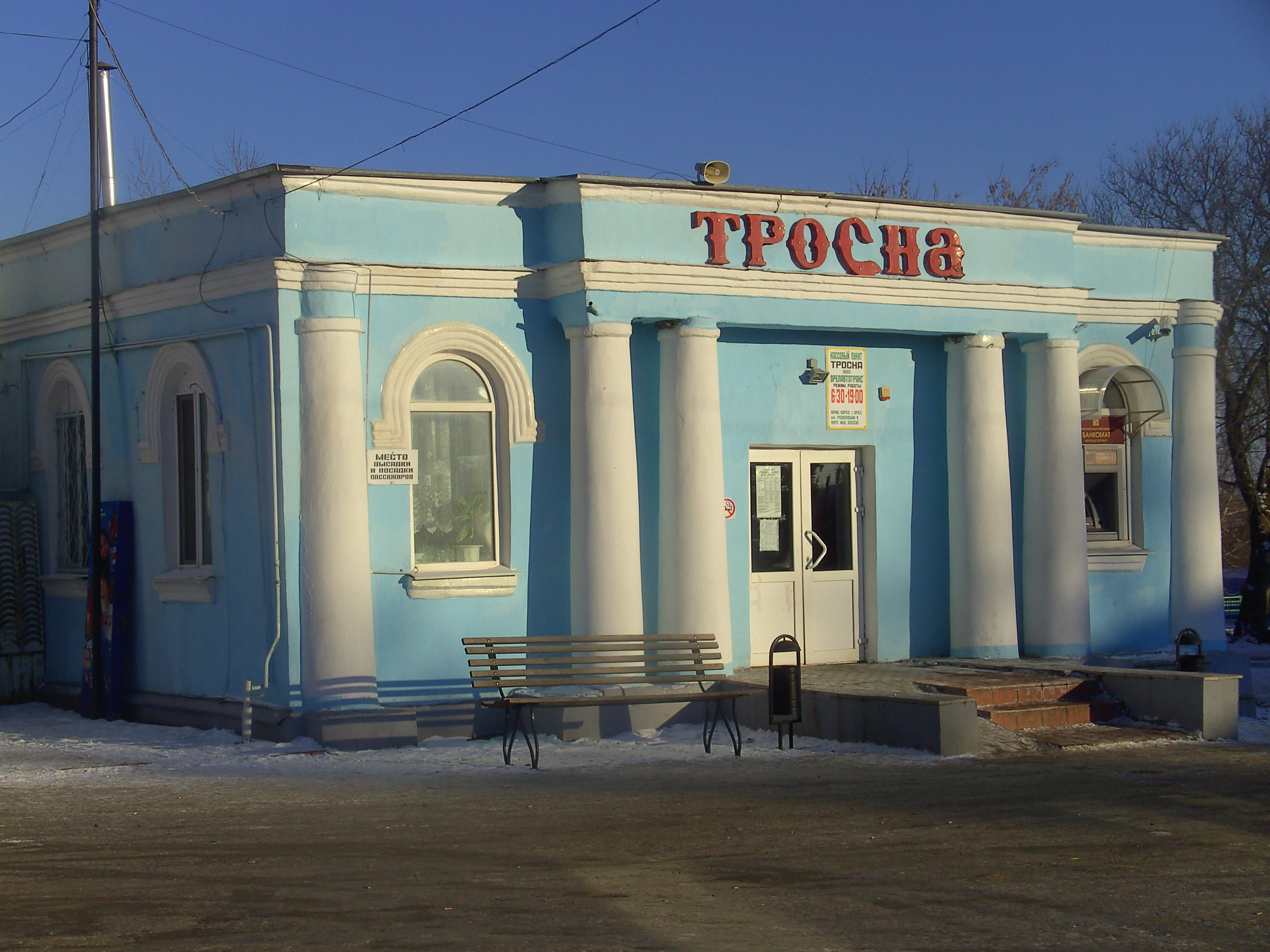
- Building in Trosna, Trosnyansky District

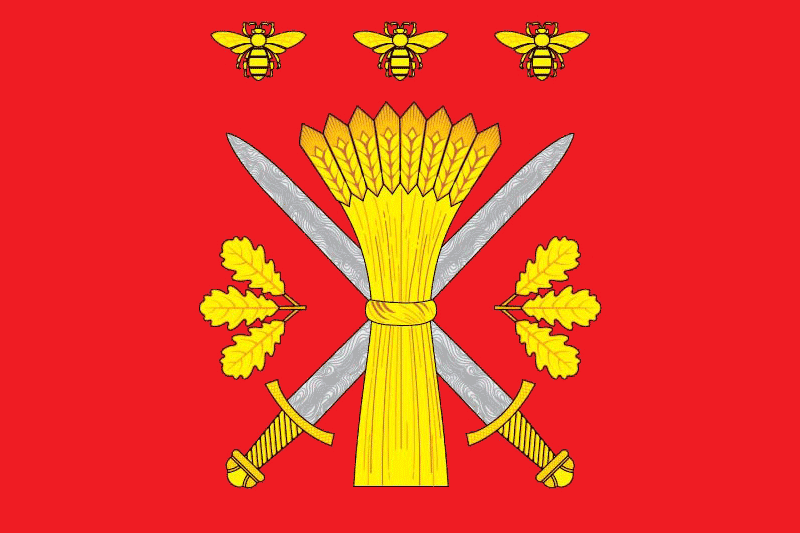
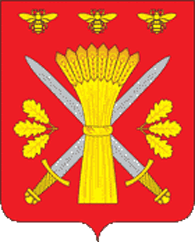
- Flag Coat of arms
- Location of Trosnyansky District in Oryol Oblast
- Coordinates: 52°26′39″N 35°46′53″E
- Country: Russia
- Federal subject: Oryol Oblast
- Established: 30 July 1928
- Administrative center: Trosna

Area
  - Total: 769.7 km^{2} (297.2 sq mi)

Population (2010 Census)
  - Total: 10,302
  - Density: 13.38/km^{2} (34.67/sq mi)
  - Urban: 0%
  - Rural: 100%

Administrative structure
  - Administrative divisions: 8 selsoviet
  - Inhabited localities: 96 rural localities

Municipal structure
  - Municipally incorporated as: Trosnyansky Municipal District
  - Municipal divisions: 0 urban settlements, 8 rural settlements
- Time zone: UTC+3 (MSK)
- OKTMO ID: 54654000
- Website: http://www.adm-trosna.ru/

Trosnyansky District (Russian: Троснянский райо́н) is an administrative and municipal district (raion), one of the twenty-four in Oryol Oblast, Russia. It is located in the southwest of the oblast. The area of the district is 769.7 square kilometers (297.2 sq mi). Its administrative center is the rural locality (a selo) of Trosna. Population: 10,302 (2010 Census); 12,453 (2002 census); 14,102 (1989 Soviet census). The population of Trosna accounts for 24.6% of the district's total population.
