= Zakharkovo, Kursk Oblast =

Rural locality in Kursk Oblast, Russia

Zakharkovo Захарково
- Selo
- Interactive map of Zakharkovo
- Location of Zakharkovo Zakharkovo (Kursk Oblast)
- Coordinates: 51°48′40″N 35°21′11″E
- Country: Russia
- Federal subject: Kursk Oblast
- Administrative district: Konyshyovsky District
- SelsovietSelsoviet: Zakharkovsky

Population (2010 Census)
  - Total: 137
  - Estimate (2010): 137 (0%)

Administrative status
  - Capital of: Zakharkovsky Selsoviet

Municipal status
  - Municipal district: Konyshyovsky Municipal District
  - Rural settlement: Zakharkovsky Selsoviet Rural Settlement
  - Capital of: Zakharkovsky Selsoviet Rural Settlement
- Time zone: UTC+3 (MSK)
- Postal code: 307627
- Dialing code: +7 47156
- OKTMO ID: 38616420101
- Website: захарковский46.рф

Zakharkovo (Russian: Захарково) is a rural locality (Russian: село, lit. 'village') and the administrative center of Zakharkovsky Selsoviet Rural Settlement, Konyshyovsky District, Kursk Oblast, Russia. Population: 137 (2010 census); 217 (2002 census);

== Geography ==
The village is located on the Kotlevka River (a tributary of the Vablya in the basin of the Seym), 64 km from the Russia–Ukraine border, 58 km north-west of Kursk, 6 km south-east of the district center – the urban-type settlement Konyshyovka.

Climate

Zakharkovo has a warm-summer humid continental climate (Dfb in the Köppen climate classification).

== Transport ==
Zakharkovo is located 61 km from the federal route M-3 Ukraine Highway, 44 km from the route M-2 Crimea Highway, 45.5 km from the route A-142 (Trosna – M3 highway), 30 km from the road of regional importance 38K-038 (Fatezh – Dmitriyev), 5 km from the road 38K-005 (Konyshyovka – Zhigayevo – 38K-038), 6.5 km from the road 38K-023 (Lgov – Konyshyovka), on the road of intermunicipal significance 38Н-134 (38K-005 – Zakharkovo), 4 km from the nearest railway halt 565 km (railway line Navlya – Lgov-Kiyevsky).

The rural locality is situated 64 km from Kursk Vostochny Airport, 154 km from Belgorod International Airport and 267 km from Voronezh Peter the Great Airport.
