= Svapa =

River in Kursk Oblast, Russia

Svapa Свапа
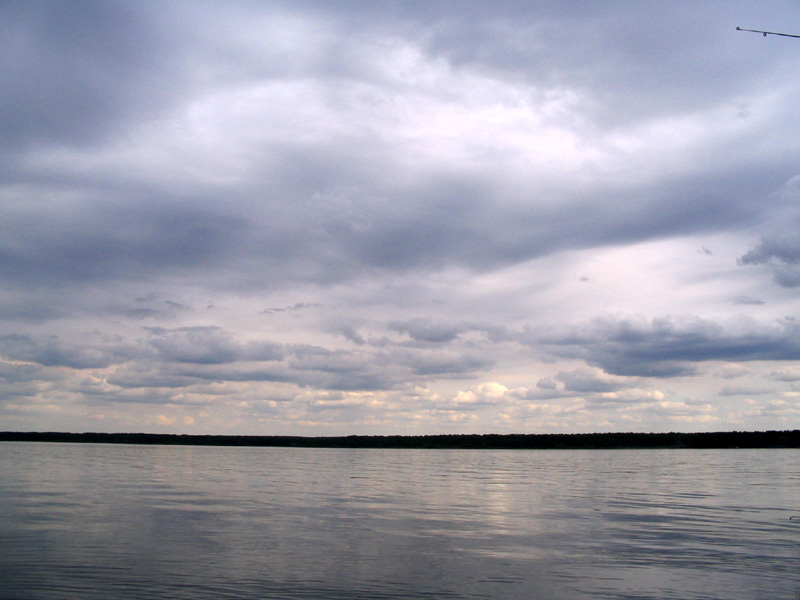
- A reservoir along the river

Location
- Country: Russia

Physical characteristics
- Source
  - location: Podsoborovka
  - coordinates: 52°18′43″N 36°07′41″E
- Mouth
  - location: Seym
  - coordinates: 51°44′16″N 34°56′44″E
- Length: 197 km (122 mi)
- Basin size: 4,990 km^{2} (1,930 sq mi)

Basin features
- Progression: Svapa → Seym → Desna → Dnieper→ Dnieper–Bug estuary→ Black Sea
- River system: Dnieper Basin

The Svapa (Russian: Свапа) is a river in Kursk Oblast, Russia, with a total length of 197 kilometres (122 mi) and a basin size of 4,990 square kilometres (1,930 sq mi).

== History ==
In 1976, the Mikhailovskoye Reservoir was built on the Svapa River at the confluence with the Bely Nemyod. This reservoir is mainly used for agriculture in Kursk and Oryol Oblasts.

In 2018, in an effort to protect the local flora and fauna, such as those listed in the Red Data Book, the area around the source of the Svapa River became designated as a natural monument. There used to also be two other natural monuments along the river: "Pustosh-Koren" in Zheleznogorsky District and "Artesian Spring" near the village of Gnan, but they were both abolished in 2009.

== Characteristics ==
The river begins near the village of Podsoborovka, then travels west along the border between Oryol Oblast and Kursk Oblast. The river passes through the town of Dmitriev, before merging into the Seym.

The floodplain of the Svapa contains many swamps, and the largest massifs are concentrated in the middle and lower regions of the river. The water along the river is quite clean and transparent. During the winter months from November to December, the Svapa freezes up, and usually defrosts by mid-April.
