= Bolshoye Gorodkovo =

Rural locality in Kursk Oblast, Russia

Bolshoye Gorodkovo Большое Городьково
- Village
- Interactive map of Bolshoye Gorodkovo
- Location of Bolshoye Gorodkovo Bolshoye Gorodkovo (Kursk Oblast)
- Coordinates: 51°53′03″N 35°34′08″E
- Country: Russia
- Federal subject: Kursk Oblast
- Administrative district: Konyshyovsky District
- SelsovietSelsoviet: Malogorodkovsky

Population (2010 Census)
  - Total: 63
  - Estimate (2010): 63 (0%)

Municipal status
  - Municipal district: Konyshyovsky Municipal District
  - Rural settlement: Malogorodkovsky Selsoviet Rural Settlement
- Time zone: UTC+3 (MSK)
- Postal code: 307624
- Dialing code: +7 47156
- OKTMO ID: 38616426151
- Website: malogorod.rkursk.ru

Bolshoye Gorodkovo (Russian: Большое Городьково) is a rural locality (Russian: деревня, lit. 'village') in Malogorodkovsky Selsoviet Rural Settlement, Konyshyovsky District, Kursk Oblast, Russia. Population: 63 (2010 census); 101 (2002 census);

== Geography ==
The village is located in the Gorodkov Brook basin (a tributary of the Prutishche in the basin of the Seym), 79.5 km from the Russia–Ukraine border, 46 km north-west of Kursk, 20 km north-east of the district center – the urban-type settlement Konyshyovka, 2 km from the selsoviet center – Maloye Gorodkovo.

Climate

Bolshoye Gorodkovo has a warm-summer humid continental climate (Dfb in the Köppen climate classification).

Climate data for Bolshoye Gorodkovo
Month	Jan	Feb	Mar	Apr	May	Jun	Jul	Aug	Sep	Oct	Nov	Dec	Year
Mean daily maximum °C (°F)	−4.2 (24.4)	−3.3 (26.1)	2.5 (36.5)	12.7 (54.9)	19 (66)	22.3 (72.1)	24.9 (76.8)	24.2 (75.6)	17.8 (64.0)	10.3 (50.5)	3.2 (37.8)	−1.3 (29.7)	10.7 (51.2)
Daily mean °C (°F)	−6.2 (20.8)	−5.7 (21.7)	−1 (30)	8 (46)	14.4 (57.9)	18 (64)	20.6 (69.1)	19.6 (67.3)	13.7 (56.7)	7.1 (44.8)	1 (34)	−3.2 (26.2)	7.2 (44.9)
Mean daily minimum °C (°F)	−8.6 (16.5)	−8.6 (16.5)	−4.9 (23.2)	2.6 (36.7)	9 (48)	12.8 (55.0)	15.7 (60.3)	14.7 (58.5)	9.6 (49.3)	3.8 (38.8)	−1.2 (29.8)	−5.3 (22.5)	3.3 (37.9)
Average precipitation mm (inches)	51 (2.0)	45 (1.8)	47 (1.9)	51 (2.0)	62 (2.4)	72 (2.8)	78 (3.1)	56 (2.2)	59 (2.3)	58 (2.3)	48 (1.9)	50 (2.0)	677 (26.7)
Source: https://en.climate-data.org/asia/russian-federation/kursk-oblast/bol-shoye-gorod-kovo-656655/

== Transport ==
Bolshoye Gorodkovo is located 75 km from the federal route M-3 Ukraine Highway, 26.5 km from the route M-2 Crimea Highway, 45.5 km from the route A-142 (Trosna – M3 highway), 21.5 km from the road of regional importance 38K-038 (Fatezh – Dmitriyev), 13 km from the road 38K-005 (Konyshyovka – Zhigayevo – 38K-038), 26 km from the road 38K-017 (Kursk – Lgov – Rylsk – border with Ukraine), on the road of intermunicipal significance 38Н-136 (38K-005 – Maloye Gorodkovo – Bolshoye Gorodkovo), 18 km from the nearest railway halt 552 km (railway line Navlya – Lgov-Kiyevsky).

The rural locality is situated 51 km from Kursk Vostochny Airport, 153 km from Belgorod International Airport and 252 km from Voronezh Peter the Great Airport.
