= Maloye Gorodkovo =

Rural locality in Kursk Oblast, Russia

Maloye Gorodkovo Малое Городьково
- Selo
- Interactive map of Maloye Gorodkovo
- Location of Maloye Gorodkovo Maloye Gorodkovo (Kursk Oblast)
- Coordinates: 51°54′11″N 35°32′11″E
- Country: Russia
- Federal subject: Kursk Oblast
- Administrative district: Konyshyovsky District
- SelsovietSelsoviet: Malogorodkovsky

Population (2010 Census)
  - Total: 205
  - Estimate (2010): 205 (0%)

Administrative status
  - Capital of: Malogorodkovsky Selsoviet

Municipal status
  - Municipal district: Konyshyovsky Municipal District
  - Rural settlement: Malogorodkovsky Selsoviet Rural Settlement
  - Capital of: Malogorodkovsky Selsoviet Rural Settlement
- Time zone: UTC+3 (MSK)
- Postal code: 307624
- Dialing code: +7 47156
- OKTMO ID: 38616426146
- Website: malogorod.rkursk.ru

Maloye Gorodkovo (Russian: Малое Городьково) is a rural locality (Russian: село, lit. 'village') and the administrative center of Malogorodkovsky Selsoviet Rural Settlement, Konyshyovsky District, Kursk Oblast, Russia. Population: 205 (2010 census); 263 (2002 census);

== Geography ==
The village is located on the Gorodkov Brook (a tributary of the Prutishche in the basin of the Seym), 77 km from the Russia–Ukraine border, 49 km north-west of Kursk, 18 km north-east of the district center – the urban-type settlement Konyshyovka.

Climate

Maloye Gorodkovo has a warm-summer humid continental climate (Dfb in the Köppen climate classification).

Climate data for Maloye Gorodkovo
| Month | Jan | Feb | Mar | Apr | May | Jun | Jul | Aug | Sep | Oct | Nov | Dec | Year |
|---|---|---|---|---|---|---|---|---|---|---|---|---|---|
| Mean daily maximum °C (°F) | −4.2 (24.4) | −3.2 (26.2) | 2.5 (36.5) | 12.7 (54.9) | 19 (66) | 22.3 (72.1) | 24.9 (76.8) | 24.1 (75.4) | 17.8 (64.0) | 10.3 (50.5) | 3.3 (37.9) | −1.3 (29.7) | 10.7 (51.2) |
| Daily mean °C (°F) | −6.2 (20.8) | −5.7 (21.7) | −1 (30) | 7.9 (46.2) | 14.4 (57.9) | 18 (64) | 20.6 (69.1) | 19.6 (67.3) | 13.7 (56.7) | 7.1 (44.8) | 1.1 (34.0) | −3.2 (26.2) | 7.2 (44.9) |
| Mean daily minimum °C (°F) | −8.6 (16.5) | −8.7 (16.3) | −5 (23) | 2.5 (36.5) | 8.9 (48.0) | 12.7 (54.9) | 15.6 (60.1) | 14.6 (58.3) | 9.5 (49.1) | 3.8 (38.8) | −1.2 (29.8) | −5.3 (22.5) | 3.2 (37.8) |
| Average precipitation mm (inches) | 51 (2.0) | 45 (1.8) | 47 (1.9) | 51 (2.0) | 62 (2.4) | 72 (2.8) | 78 (3.1) | 56 (2.2) | 59 (2.3) | 58 (2.3) | 48 (1.9) | 50 (2.0) | 677 (26.7) |
Source: https://en.climate-data.org/asia/russian-federation/kursk-oblast/maloye-gorod-kovo-656656/

== Transport ==
Maloye Gorodkovo is located 72 km from the federal route M-3 Ukraine Highway, 28 km from the route M-2 Crimea Highway, 43 km from the route A-142 (Trosna – M3 highway), 20 km from the road of regional importance 38K-038 (Fatezh – Dmitriyev), 10 km from the road 38K-005 (Konyshyovka – Zhigayevo – 38K-038), 28 km from the road 38K-017 (Kursk – Lgov – Rylsk – border with Ukraine), on the road of intermunicipal significance 38Н-136 (38K-005 – Maloye Gorodkovo – Bolshoye Gorodkovo), 15 km from the nearest railway halt 552 km (railway line Navlya – Lgov-Kiyevsky).

The rural locality is situated 54 km from Kursk Vostochny Airport, 156 km from Belgorod International Airport and 254 km from Voronezh Peter the Great Airport.
