= Zhigayevo =

Rural locality in Kursk Oblast, Russia

Zhigayevo Жигаево
- Selo
- Interactive map of Zhigayevo
- Location of Zhigayevo Zhigayevo (Kursk Oblast)
- Coordinates: 52°02′27″N 35°27′26″E
- Country: Russia
- Federal subject: Kursk Oblast
- Administrative district: Konyshyovsky District
- SelsovietSelsoviet: Vablinsky
- Elevation: 211 m (692 ft)

Population (2010 Census)
  - Total: 258
  - Estimate (2010): 258 (0%)

Municipal status
  - Municipal district: Konyshyovsky Municipal District
  - Rural settlement: Vablinsky Selsoviet Rural Settlement
- Time zone: UTC+3 (MSK)
- Postal code: 307612
- Dialing code: +7 47156
- OKTMO ID: 38616408136
- Website: www.vablinsky.ru

Zhigayevo (Russian: Жигаево) is a rural locality (Russian: село, lit. 'village') in Vablinsky Selsoviet Rural Settlement, Konyshyovsky District, Kursk Oblast, Russia. Population: 258 (2010 census); 444 (2002 census);

== Geography ==
The village is located on the Zhigayevka River (a left tributary of the Svapa River), 75.5 km from the Russia–Ukraine border, 62 km north-west of Kursk, 25 km north-west of the district center – the urban-type settlement Konyshyovka, 10.5 km from the selsoviet center – Vablya.

Climate

Zhigayevo has a warm-summer humid continental climate (Dfb in the Köppen climate classification).

Climate data for Zhigayevo
Month	Jan	Feb	Mar	Apr	May	Jun	Jul	Aug	Sep	Oct	Nov	Dec	Year
Mean daily maximum °C (°F)	−4.2 (24.4)	−3.3 (26.1)	2.5 (36.5)	12.6 (54.7)	19 (66)	22.2 (72.0)	24.9 (76.8)	24.1 (75.4)	17.8 (64.0)	10.2 (50.4)	3.2 (37.8)	−1.3 (29.7)	10.6 (51.2)
Daily mean °C (°F)	−6.2 (20.8)	−5.7 (21.7)	−1 (30)	7.9 (46.2)	14.4 (57.9)	18 (64)	20.6 (69.1)	19.6 (67.3)	13.7 (56.7)	7 (45)	1 (34)	−3.2 (26.2)	7.2 (44.9)
Mean daily minimum °C (°F)	−8.6 (16.5)	−8.7 (16.3)	−4.9 (23.2)	2.6 (36.7)	8.9 (48.0)	12.8 (55.0)	15.7 (60.3)	14.6 (58.3)	9.6 (49.3)	3.8 (38.8)	−1.2 (29.8)	−5.3 (22.5)	3.3 (37.9)
Average precipitation mm (inches)	51 (2.0)	45 (1.8)	47 (1.9)	51 (2.0)	62 (2.4)	72 (2.8)	78 (3.1)	56 (2.2)	59 (2.3)	58 (2.3)	48 (1.9)	50 (2.0)	677 (26.7)
Source: https://en.climate-data.org/asia/russian-federation/kursk-oblast/жигаево-553689/

== Transport ==
Zhigayevo is located 24 km from the federal route M-2 Crimea Highway, 5 km from the road of regional importance 38K-038 (Fatezh – Dmitriyev), on the road 38K-005 (Konyshyovka – Zhigayevo – 38K-038), 17.5 km from the nearest railway station Sokovninka (railway line Navlya – Lgov-Kiyevsky).

The rural locality is situated 61.5 km from Kursk Vostochny Airport, 169 km from Belgorod International Airport and 257 km from Voronezh Peter the Great Airport.
