= Trosna, Trosnyansky District, Oryol Oblast =

Rural locality in Oryol Oblast, Russia

Trosna Тросна
- Selo
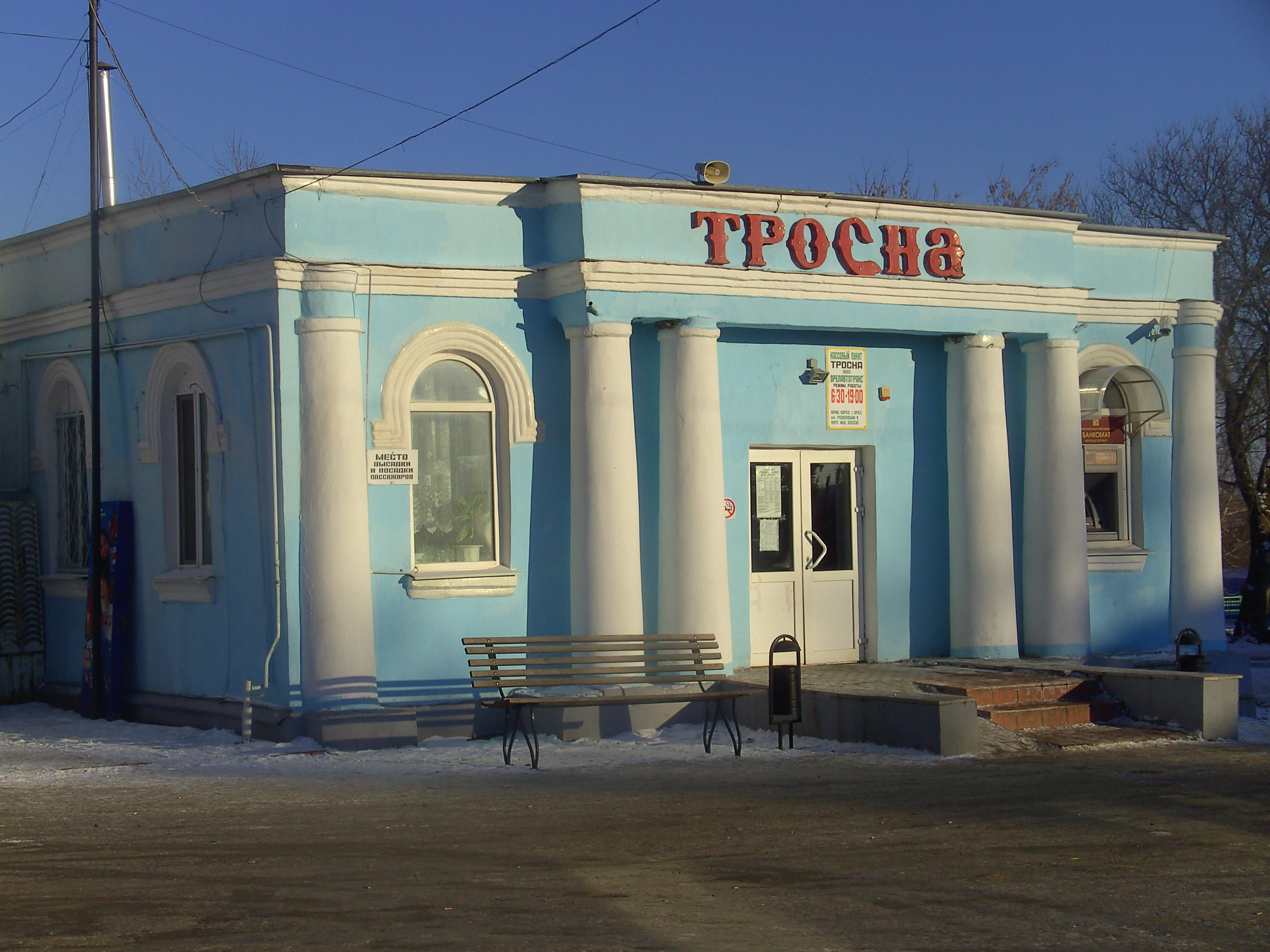
- Interactive map of Trosna
- Location of Trosna Trosna (Oryol Oblast)
- Coordinates: 52°26′49″N 35°46′51″E
- Country: Russia
- Federal subject: Oryol Oblast
- Administrative district: Trosnyansky District
- SelsovietSelsoviet: Volovsky
- First mentioned: 1861

Population (2010 Census)
  - Total: 2,530
  - Estimate (2010): 2,530 (0%)

Administrative status
  - Capital of: Trosnyansky District, Trosnyansky Selsoviet

Municipal status
  - Municipal district: Trosnyansky Municipal District
  - Rural settlement: Trosnyansky Selsoviet Rural Settlement
  - Capital of: Trosnyansky Municipal District, Trosnyansky Selsoviet Rural Settlement
- Time zone: UTC+3 (MSK)
- Postal code: 303450
- OKTMO ID: 54654430101

Trosna (Russian: Тросна́) is a rural locality (a selo) and the administrative center of Trosnyansky District, Oryol Oblast, Russia. Population: 2,530 (2010 census); 2,662 (2002 census); 2,346 (1989 Soviet census).
