= M3 highway (Russia) =

Road in Russia

Coordinates: 55°34′31″N 37°13′6″E

Federal Highway M3
- Федеральная автомобильная дорога М3
- Ukraine Highway

Route information
- Part of E101 and E391
- Length: 490 km (300 mi)
- Existed: 1976–present

Major junctions
- West end: Ukrainian border
- East end: MKAD in Moscow

Location
- Country: Russia

Highway system
- Russian Federal Highways
← M 2	→ M 4

The Russian route M3 (also known as the Ukraine Highway) is a major trunk road that runs across a distance of about 490 kilometres from Moscow to Russia's border with Ukraine.

The highway starts at the crossing of Leninsky Prospekt and Moscow Ring Road as Kiyevskoye Highway, passes south of Solntsevo and Vnukovo, then continues westward through Kaluga, Bryansk and Sevsk to the Ukrainian border. After crossing the border, the road continues as the Ukrainian M02 route to Kyiv.

The M3 is covered by the European Road E101 (Moscow-Bryansk-Hlukhiv-Kipti), also the short section, near Russo-Ukrainian border in Kalinovka is a part of E391.

On December 29, 2012, a Red Wings TU-204 overran Vnukovo's runway and crashed into the M3 Highway.

== Gallery ==
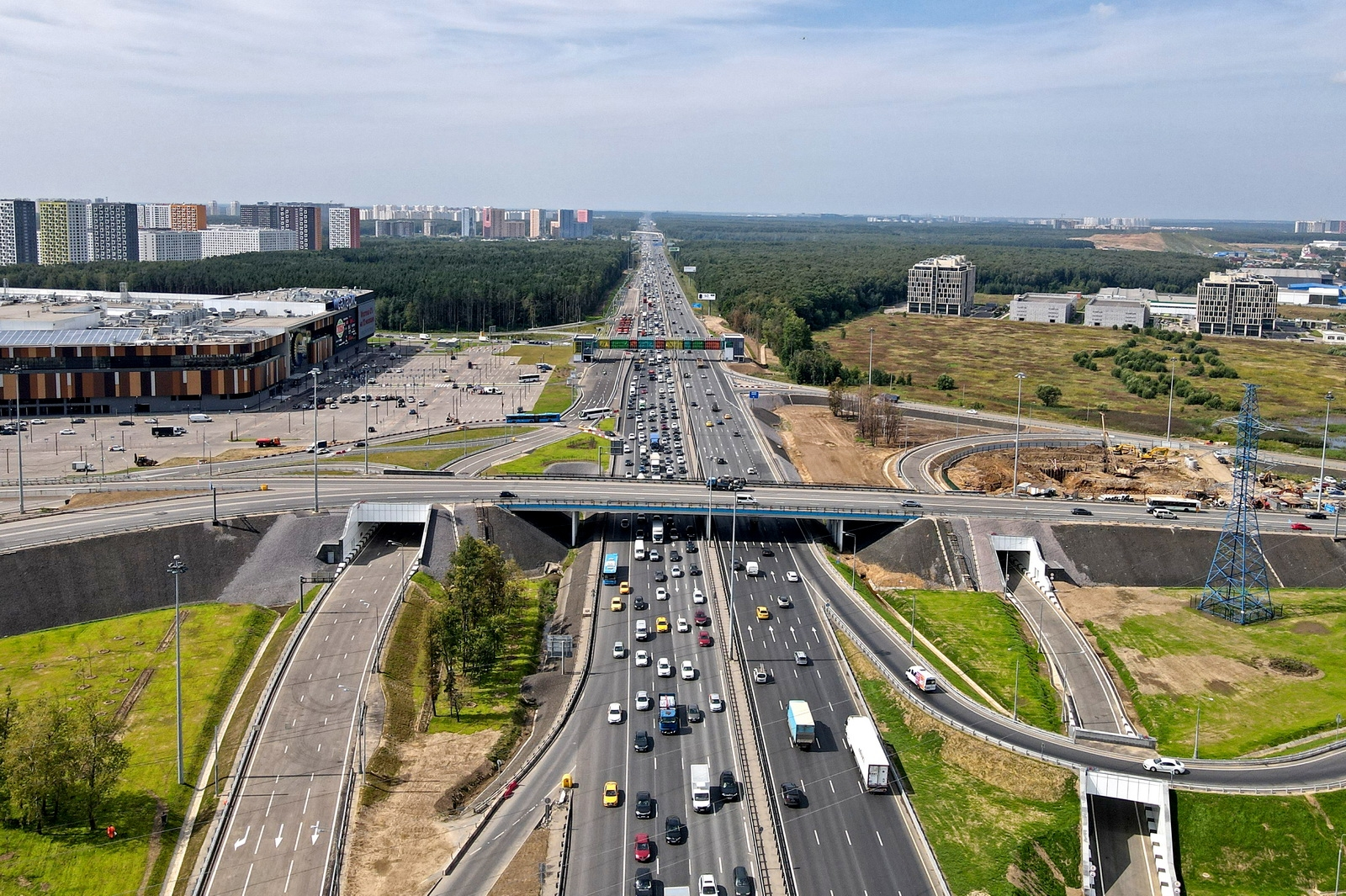

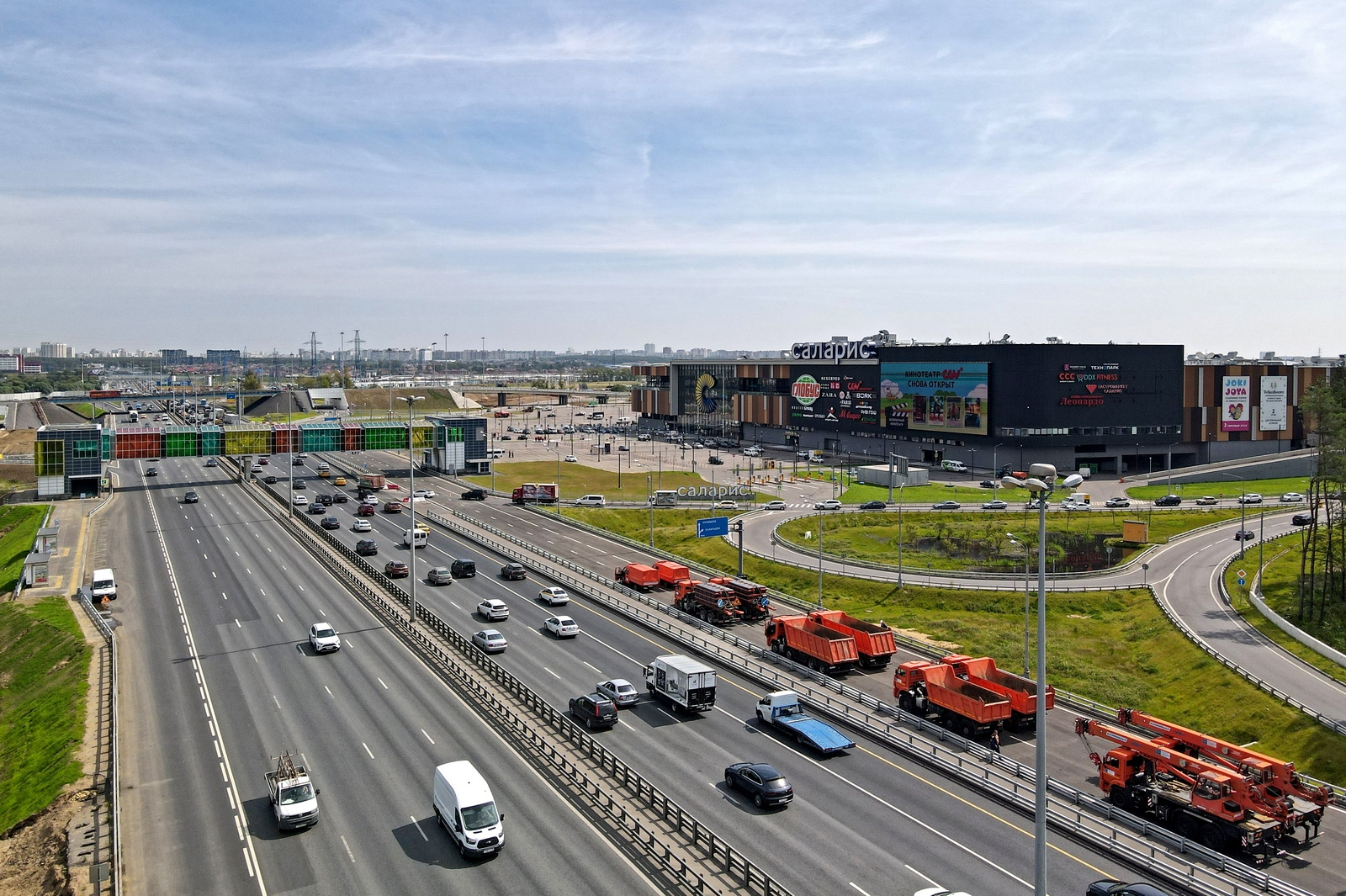

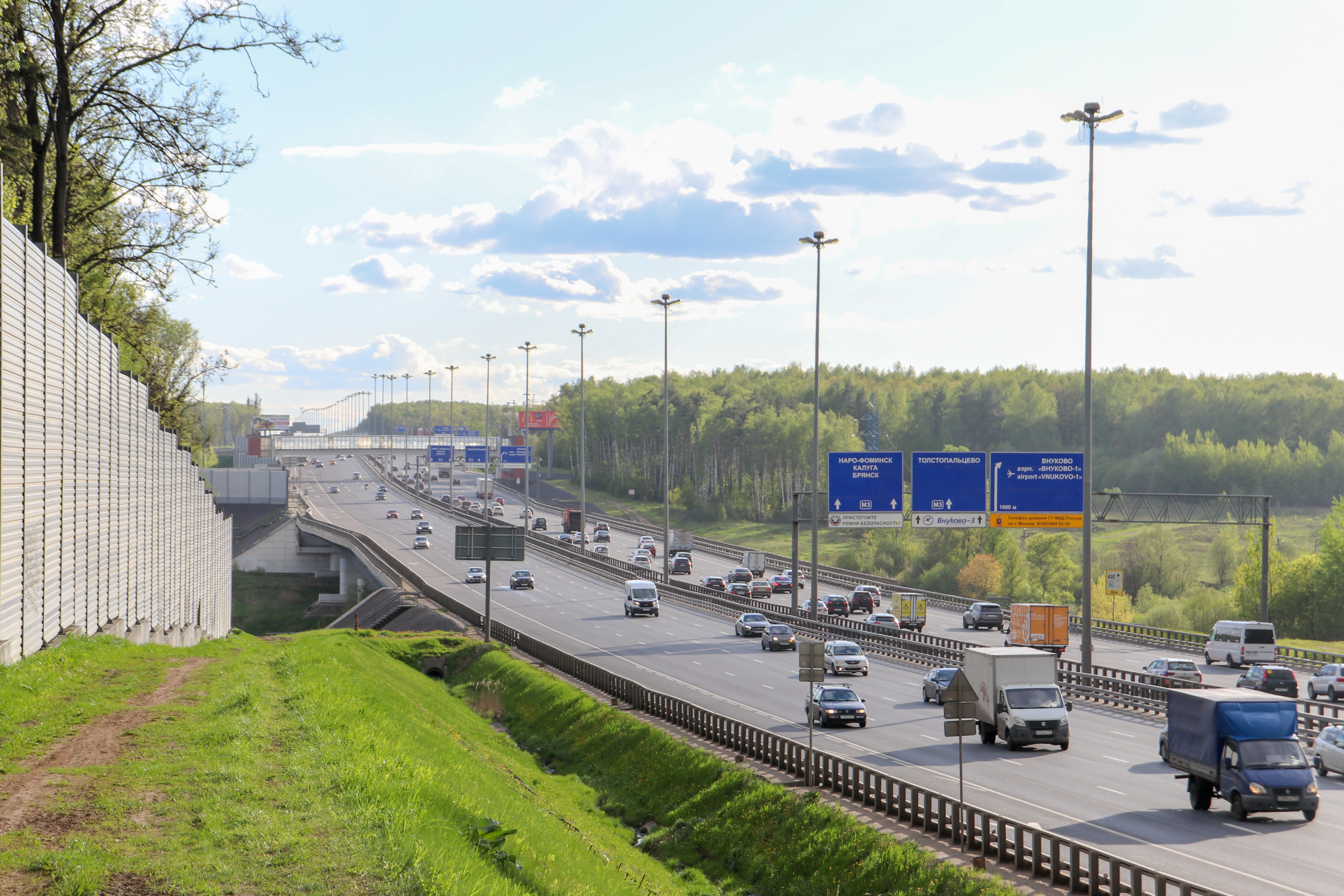
