= Konyshyovsky District =

Konyshyovsky District Конышёвский район (Russian)
- District
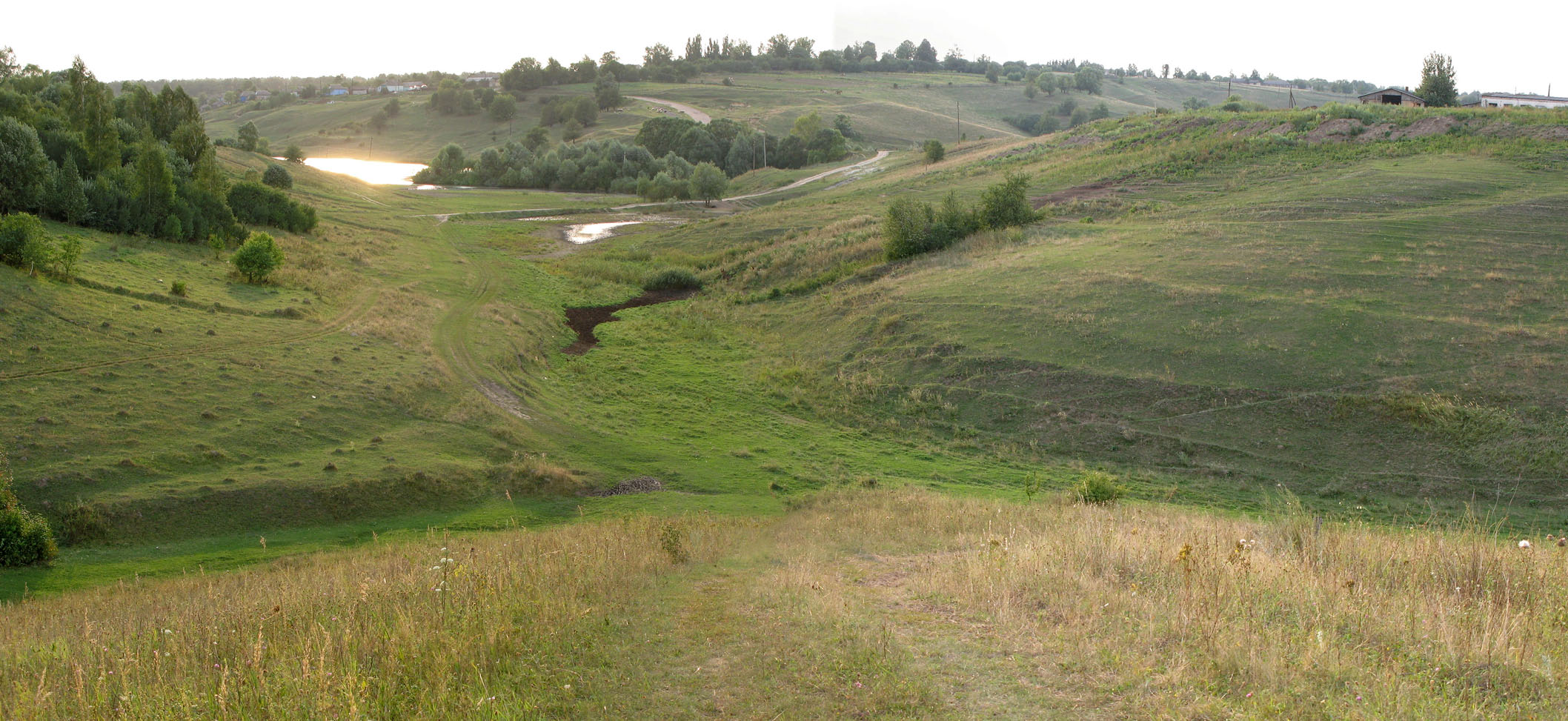
- Rural scene, Konyshyovsky District

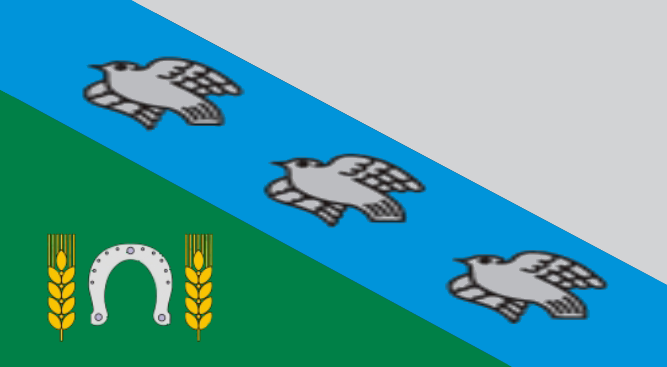
- Flag Coat of arms
- Location of Konyshyovsky District in Kursk Oblast
- Coordinates: 51°50′36″N 35°17′32″E
- Country: Russia
- Federal subject: Kursk Oblast
- Administrative center: Konyshevka

Area
  - Total: 1,135 km^{2} (438 sq mi)

Population (2010 Census)
  - Total: 10,594
  - Density: 9.334/km^{2} (24.17/sq mi)
  - Urban: 35.4%
  - Rural: 64.6%

Administrative structure
  - Administrative divisions: 1 Work settlements, 18 Selsoviets
  - Inhabited localities: 1 urban-type settlements, 89 rural localities

Municipal structure
  - Municipally incorporated as: Konyshyovsky Municipal District
  - Municipal divisions: 1 urban settlements, 9 rural settlements
- Time zone: UTC+3 (MSK)
- OKTMO ID: 38616000
- Website: konishovskiyr.rkursk.ru

Konyshyovsky District (Russian: Конышёвский райо́н) is an administrative and municipal district (raion), one of the twenty-eight in Kursk Oblast, Russia. It is located in the northwestern central part of the oblast. The area of the district is 1,135 square kilometers (438 sq mi). Its administrative center is the urban locality (a work settlement) of Konyshyovka. Population: 8,425 (2021 census); 10,594 (2010 census); 15,155 (2002 Census); 19,234 (1989 Soviet census). The population of Konyshyovka accounts for 42.7% of the district's total population.

== Geography ==
Konyshyovsky District is located in the northwest region of Kursk Oblast. The terrain is hilly plain in the north and south, with more desiccating ravines in the east. The district lies on the Orel-Kursk plateau of the Central Russian Upland. The main river in the district is the Svapa River, in the Dnieper River basin. The district is 45 kilometres (28 mi) west of the city of Kursk and 435 kilometres (270 mi) southwest of Moscow. The area measures 32 kilometres (20 mi) (north-south) by 48 kilometres (30 mi) (west-east); total area is 1,135 square kilometres (438 sq mi) (3.8% of Kursk Oblast). The administrative center is the town of Konyshyovka.

The district is bordered on the north by Dmitriyevsky District, on the east by Fatezhsky District, on the south by Lgovsky District, and on the west by Khomutovsky District.
