= Konyshyovka =

Konyshyovka Конышёвка
- Urban-type settlement
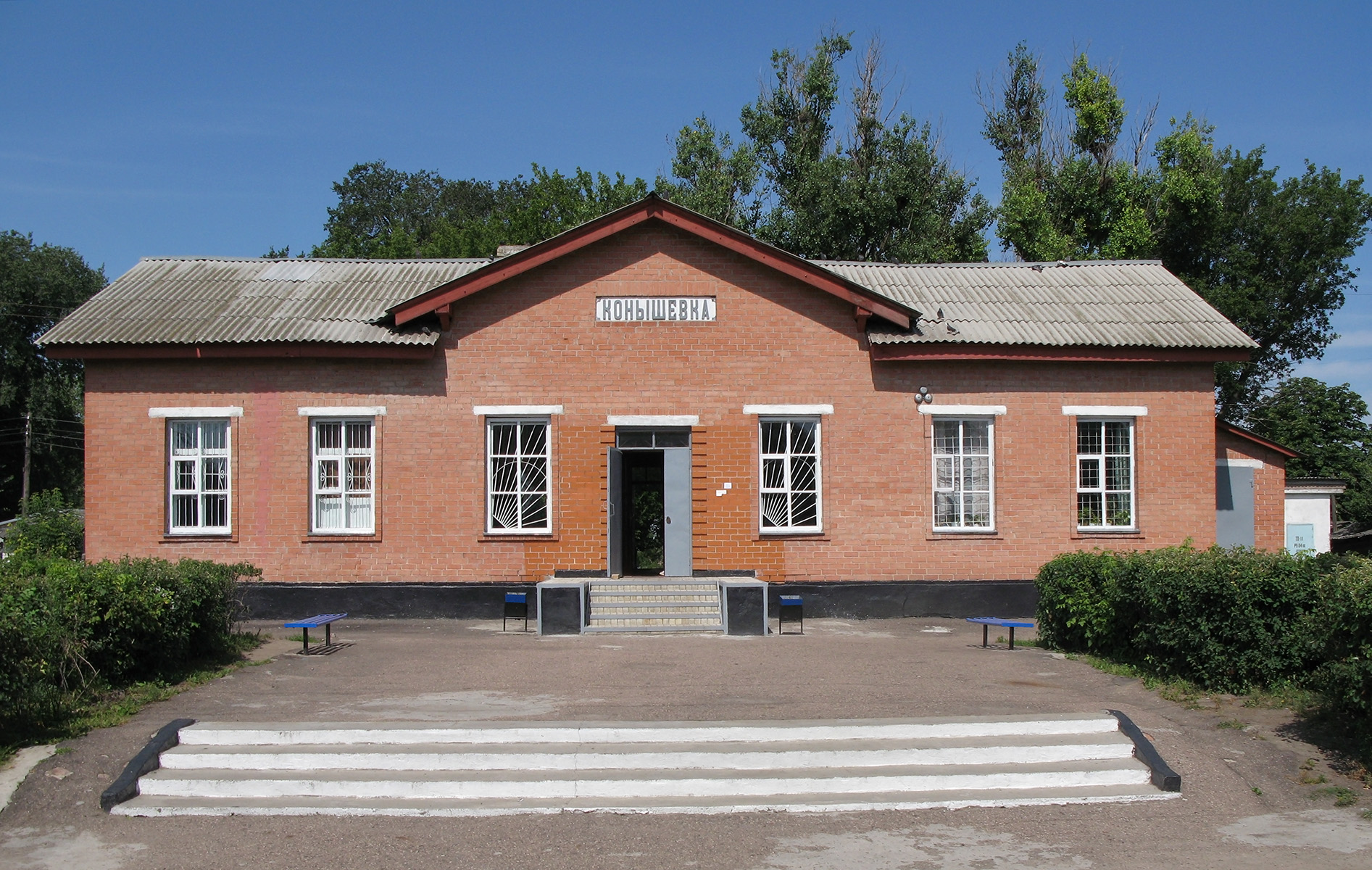
- Konyshevka's Train Station
- Interactive map of Konyshyovka
- Location of Konyshyovka Konyshyovka (Kursk Oblast)
- Coordinates: 51°50′36″N 35°17′32″E
- Country: Russia
- Federal subject: Kursk Oblast
- Administrative district: Konyshyovsky District
- Founded: 1910

Population (2010 Census)
  - Total: 3,748
  - Estimate (2025): 3,517 (−6.2%)

Administrative status
  - Capital of: Konyshyovsky District
- Time zone: UTC+3 (MSK)
- Postal code: 307620
- Dialing code: +7 471 56
- OKTMO ID: 38616151051
- Website: конышевка.рф

Konyshyovka (Russian: Конышёвка) is an urban-type settlement, the administrative center of Konyshyovsky District in Kursk Oblast, Russia. The population was 3,599 (2021 census);

== History ==
Konyshyovka was first mentioned in the 19th century as the village on Dmitriyev to Lgov route. In 1891 the Moscow Railway was extended to that point. One version of the origin of the name Konyshyovka (Конышёвка) is from Turkic word коныш 'konysh' meaning 'stop'.

Konyshyovka as the town was founded in 1910 and had received the status of an urban-type settlement in 1968.

== Demographics ==
Year	Population
1897	1053
1939	1079
1959	1701
1970	3660
1979	3389
1989	4324
2002	4132
2010	3748

Note: Census data

== Economy ==
Konyshyovka has a granary, a combine fodder factory, a brick factory, an asphalt factory, a creamery, a food factory, a meat processing factory, and a pig farm.

== Culture ==
There are different entertainment and educational organizations in town: museum of local lore, public library, children's art school. The available newspaper is "Трибуна" ("Tribune").

== Sights ==
- The sculpture on bed of honor of warriors of the Soviet army, who died in February 1943.
- Some architectural monuments: building of railroad terminal, barracks, estate of Nenarokov landowner (19th century), water tower (19th century), pharmacy building (19th century), building of The District Committee of All-Union Communist Party of Bolsheviks (1946 until 1947).
