= Dmitriyev (town) =

Town in Kursk Oblast, Russia

Dmitriyev Дмитриев
- Town
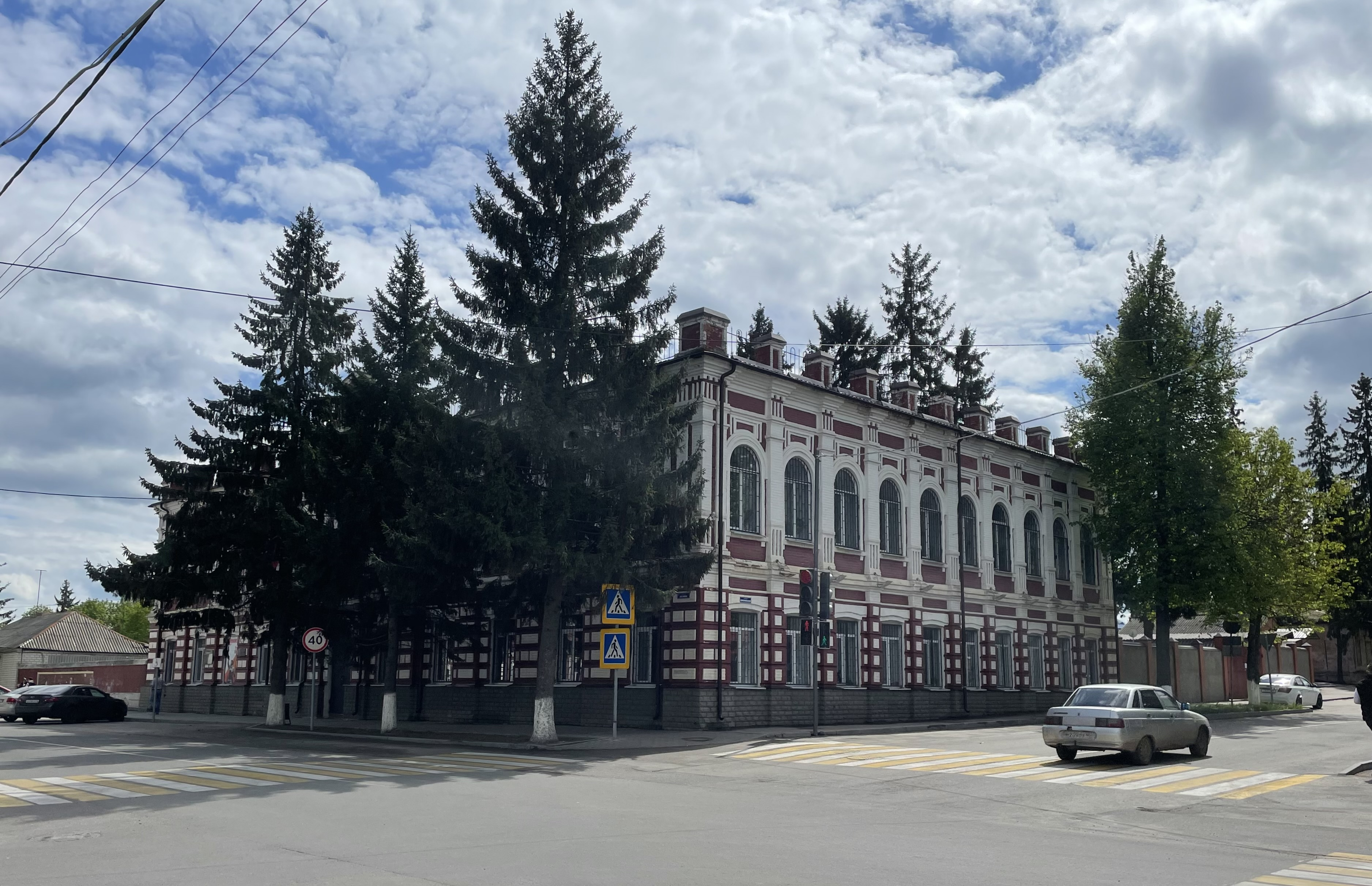

- Coat of arms
- Interactive map of Dmitriyev
- Location of Dmitriyev Dmitriyev (Kursk Oblast)
- Coordinates: 52°07′N 35°04′E
- Country: Russia
- Federal subject: Altai Krai
- Administrative district: Dmitriyevsky District
- Town of district significanceSelsoviet: Dmitriyev

Population (2010 Census)
  - Total: 7,728
  - Estimate (2024): 6,082 (−21.3%)

Administrative status
  - Capital of: Dmitriyevsky District, town of district significance of Dmitriyev

Municipal status
  - Municipal district: Dmitriyevsky Municipal District
  - Urban settlement: Dmitriyev Urban Settlement
  - Capital of: Dmitriyevsky Municipal District, Dmitriyev Urban Settlement
- Time zone: UTC+7 (MSK+4)
- Postal codes: 307500, 307501
- OKTMO ID: 019u4y4992
- Website: dmitriev4605.rkursk.ru/index.php?mun_obr=68&sub_menus_id=608

Dmitriyev (Russian: Дми́триев, lit. 'Dmitriy's'), also known as Dmitriyev-Lgovsky (Дми́триев-Льго́вский), is a town and the administrative center of Dmitriyevsky District of Kursk Oblast, Russia, located on the Svapa River (Dnieper's basin), on the Moscow–Kyiv highway, 159 kilometers (99 mi) northwest of Kursk, the administrative center of the oblast. Population: 6,317 (2021 census); 7,728 (2010 census); 8,838 (2002 census); 11,187 (1989 Soviet census).

== Coat of arms ==
Dmitriev's Coat of Arms was confirmed and took into force on 8 January 1780. The author of the symbol is the president of the heraldic office Volkov. The Coat of Arms is visually attractive and has a lot of symbolic meaning related to Dmitriev's history and beautiful nature.

On the top of the symbol, you can see Coat of Arms of Kursk, showing administrative belongings of the town. The bottom symbolises Dmitriev's geographical position on hills. The town is located on five hills which you can see on the municipal arms.

During the heraldic reform in 1860, it was an attempt to change the Dmitriev Coat of Arms. Proposed changes were submitted by B.Kene. The idea was to change the symbol completely. Kene proposed the symbol shown a gold pear on the green shield with a small Coat of Arms of Kursk in the left upper corner. The shield was surrounded by golden leaves and linked with Alexander's tape. The symbol was crowned with bricks crown.

However, proposed changes were not confirmed and took into force and Dmitriev's official symbol still the same.

== History ==
During World War II, Dmitriyev was occupied by German troops from October 8, 1941 to March 2, 1943.

== Administrative and municipal status ==
Within the framework of administrative divisions, Dmitriyev serves as the administrative center of Dmitriyevsky District. As an administrative division, it is incorporated within Dmitriyevsky District as the town of district significance of Dmitriyev. As a municipal division, the town of district significance of Dmitriyev is incorporated within Dmitriyevsky Municipal District as Dmitriyev Urban Settlement.
