= Verkhnyaya Sokovninka =

Rural locality in Kursk Oblast, Russia

Verkhnyaya Sokovninka Верхняя Соковнинка
- Selo
- Interactive map of Verkhnyaya Sokovninka
- Location of Verkhnyaya Sokovninka Verkhnyaya Sokovninka (Kursk Oblast)
- Coordinates: 51°55′57″N 35°14′02″E
- Country: Russia
- Federal subject: Kursk Oblast
- Administrative district: Konyshyovsky District
- SelsovietSelsoviet: Naumovsky

Population (2010 Census)
  - Total: 147
  - Estimate (2010): 147 (0%)

Municipal status
  - Municipal district: Konyshyovsky Municipal District
  - Rural settlement: Naumovsky Selsoviet Rural Settlement
- Time zone: UTC+3 (MSK)
- Postal code: 307613
- Dialing code: +7 47156
- OKTMO ID: 38616432141
- Website: naumovsky.ru

Verkhnyaya Sokovninka (Russian: Верхняя Соковнинка) is a rural locality (Russian: село, lit. 'village') in Naumovsky Selsoviet Rural Settlement, Konyshyovsky District, Kursk Oblast, Russia. Population: 147 (2010 census); 266 (2002 census);

== Geography ==
The village is located on the Chmacha River (a left tributary of the Svapa River), 58 km from the Russia–Ukraine border, 69 km north-west of Kursk, 10.5 km north-west of the district center – the urban-type settlement Konyshyovka, 4 km from the selsoviet center – Naumovka.

Climate

Verkhnyaya Sokovninka has a warm-summer humid continental climate (Dfb in the Köppen climate classification).

Climate data for Verkhnyaya Sokovninka
Month	Jan	Feb	Mar	Apr	May	Jun	Jul	Aug	Sep	Oct	Nov	Dec	Year
Mean daily maximum °C (°F)	−3.9 (25.0)	−3 (27)	2.9 (37.2)	13 (55)	19.2 (66.6)	22.5 (72.5)	25 (77)	24.3 (75.7)	18 (64)	10.5 (50.9)	3.4 (38.1)	−1.1 (30.0)	10.9 (51.6)
Daily mean °C (°F)	−6 (21)	−5.5 (22.1)	−0.7 (30.7)	8.2 (46.8)	14.6 (58.3)	18.2 (64.8)	20.8 (69.4)	19.8 (67.6)	13.9 (57.0)	7.3 (45.1)	1.3 (34.3)	−3 (27)	7.4 (45.3)
Mean daily minimum °C (°F)	−8.4 (16.9)	−8.5 (16.7)	−4.7 (23.5)	2.7 (36.9)	9 (48)	12.9 (55.2)	15.8 (60.4)	14.7 (58.5)	9.7 (49.5)	4 (39)	−1 (30)	−5.2 (22.6)	3.4 (38.1)
Average precipitation mm (inches)	51 (2.0)	45 (1.8)	47 (1.9)	51 (2.0)	63 (2.5)	70 (2.8)	80 (3.1)	56 (2.2)	59 (2.3)	58 (2.3)	49 (1.9)	50 (2.0)	679 (26.8)
Source: https://en.climate-data.org/asia/russian-federation/kursk-oblast/верхняя-соковнинка-662711/

== Transport ==
Verkhnyaya Sokovninka is located 51 km from the federal route M-3 Ukraine Highway, 43 km from the route M-2 Crimea Highway, 28 km from the route A-142 (Trosna – M3 highway), 14 km from the road of regional importance 38K-038 (Fatezh – Dmitriyev), 6.5 km from the road 38K-005 (Konyshyovka – Zhigayevo – 38K-038), 8.5 km from the road of intermunicipal significance 38H-144 (Konyshyovka – Makaro-Petrovskoye, with the access road to the villages of Belyayevo and Chernicheno), 3 km from the road 38Н-146 (38N-144 – Oleshenka with the access road to Naumovka), on the road 38Н-147 (38N-146 – Staraya Belitsa – Bely Klyuch – Grinyovka), 2 km from the nearest railway halt 543 km (railway line Navlya – Lgov-Kiyevsky).

The rural locality is situated 75 km from Kursk Vostochny Airport, 170 km from Belgorod International Airport and 275 km from Voronezh Peter the Great Airport.
