= Artakovo-Vandarets =

Rural locality in Kursk Oblast, Russia

Artakovo-Vandarets Артаково-Вандарец
- Selo
- Interactive map of Artakovo-Vandarets
- Location of Artakovo-Vandarets Artakovo-Vandarets (Kursk Oblast)
- Coordinates: 51°53′47″N 35°11′26″E
- Country: Russia
- Federal subject: Kursk Oblast
- Administrative district: Konyshyovsky District
- SelsovietSelsoviet: Belyayevsky

Population (2010 Census)
  - Total: 52
  - Estimate (2010): 52 (0%)

Municipal status
  - Municipal district: Konyshyovsky Municipal District
  - Rural settlement: Belyayevsky Selsoviet Rural Settlement
- Time zone: UTC+3 (MSK)
- Postal code: 307630
- Dialing code: +7 47156
- OKTMO ID: 38616404141
- Website: беляевский.рф

Artakovo-Vandarets (Russian: Артаково-Вандарец) is a rural locality (Russian: село, lit. 'village') in Belyayevsky Selsoviet Rural Settlement, Konyshyovsky District, Kursk Oblast, Russia. Population: 52 (2010 census); 132 (2002 census);

== Geography ==
The village is located on the Vandarets River (a left tributary of the Svapa River), 54.5 km from the Russia–Ukraine border, 70 km north-west of Kursk, 8.5 km north-west of the district center – the urban-type settlement Konyshyovka, 7 km from the selsoviet center – Belyayevo.

Climate

Artakovo-Vandarets has a warm-summer humid continental climate (Dfb in the Köppen climate classification).

Climate data for Artakovo-Vandarets
Month	Jan	Feb	Mar	Apr	May	Jun	Jul	Aug	Sep	Oct	Nov	Dec	Year
Mean daily maximum °C (°F)	−3.9 (25.0)	−3 (27)	2.9 (37.2)	13 (55)	19.2 (66.6)	22.5 (72.5)	25 (77)	24.3 (75.7)	18 (64)	10.5 (50.9)	3.4 (38.1)	−1.1 (30.0)	10.9 (51.6)
Daily mean °C (°F)	−6 (21)	−5.5 (22.1)	−0.7 (30.7)	8.2 (46.8)	14.6 (58.3)	18.2 (64.8)	20.8 (69.4)	19.8 (67.6)	13.9 (57.0)	7.3 (45.1)	1.3 (34.3)	−3 (27)	7.4 (45.3)
Mean daily minimum °C (°F)	−8.4 (16.9)	−8.5 (16.7)	−4.7 (23.5)	2.7 (36.9)	9 (48)	12.9 (55.2)	15.8 (60.4)	14.7 (58.5)	9.7 (49.5)	4 (39)	−1 (30)	−5.2 (22.6)	3.4 (38.1)
Average precipitation mm (inches)	51 (2.0)	45 (1.8)	47 (1.9)	51 (2.0)	63 (2.5)	70 (2.8)	80 (3.1)	56 (2.2)	59 (2.3)	58 (2.3)	49 (1.9)	50 (2.0)	679 (26.8)
Source: https://en.climate-data.org/asia/russian-federation/kursk-oblast/артаково-вандарец-662704/

== Transport ==
Artakovo-Vandarets is located 48 km from the federal route M-3 Ukraine Highway, 48 km from the route M-2 Crimea Highway, 30 km from the route A-142 (Trosna – M3 highway), 18 km from the road of regional importance 38K-038 (Fatezh – Dmitriyev), 8 km from the road 38K-005 (Konyshyovka – Zhigayevo – 38K-038), 17 km from the road 38K-003 (Dmitriyev – Beryoza – Menshikovo – Khomutovka), 3.5 km from the road of intermunicipal significance 38Н-467 (Mashkino – railway station near Sokovninka – Naumovka), 5.5 km from the road 38H-144 (Konyshyovka – Makaro-Petrovskoye, with the access road to the villages of Belyayevo and Chernicheno), on the road 38Н-145 (38N-144 – Artakovo-Vandarets), 6.5 km from the nearest railway station Sokovninka (railway line Navlya – Lgov-Kiyevsky).

The rural locality is situated 76 km from Kursk Vostochny Airport, 168 km from Belgorod International Airport and 277 km from Voronezh Peter the Great Airport.
