= Krasnaya Zarya, Lgovsky District, Kursk Oblast =

Rural locality in Kursk Oblast, Russia

Krasnaya Zarya Красная Заря
- Khutor
- Interactive map of Krasnaya Zarya
- Location of Krasnaya Zarya Krasnaya Zarya (Kursk Oblast)
- Coordinates: 51°43′39″N 35°06′48″E
- Country: Russia
- Federal subject: Kursk Oblast
- Administrative district: Lgovsky District
- SelsovietSelsoviet: Gustomoysky

Population (2010 Census)
  - Total: 5
  - Estimate (2010): 5 (0%)

Municipal status
  - Municipal district: Lgovsky Municipal District
  - Rural settlement: Gustomoysky Selsoviet Rural Settlement
- Time zone: UTC+3 (MSK)
- Postal code: 307724
- Dialing code: +7 47140
- OKTMO ID: 38622424136
- Website: gustomoy.rkursk.ru

Krasnaya Zarya (Russian: Красная Заря) is a rural locality (a khutor) in Gustomoysky Selsoviet Rural Settlement, Lgovsky District, Kursk Oblast, Russia. Population: 5 (2010 census); 9 (2002 census);

== Geography ==
The khutor is located on the Sprutets River (a left tributary of the Prutishche in the Seym basin), 46.5 km from the Russia–Ukraine border, 74 km west of Kursk, 11 km north-west of the district center – the town Lgov, 11 km from the selsoviet center – Gustomoy.

Climate

Krasnaya Zarya has a warm-summer humid continental climate (Dfb in the Köppen climate classification).

== Transport ==
Krasnaya Zarya is located 10 km from the road of regional importance 38K-017 (Kursk – Lgov – Rylsk – border with Ukraine) as part of the European route E38, 9 km from the road 38K-023 (Lgov – Konyshyovka), 15 km from the road of intermunicipal significance 38H-144 (Konyshyovka – Makaro-Petrovskoye, with the access road to the villages of Belyayevo and Chernicheno), 5.5 km from the road 38Н-152 (38N-144 – Shustovo – Korobkino), 10 km from the nearest railway station Sherekino (railway line Navlya – Lgov-Kiyevsky).

The rural locality is situated 81 km from Kursk Vostochny Airport, 157 km from Belgorod International Airport and 284 km from Voronezh Peter the Great Airport.
