= Krasnaya Sloboda, Kursk Oblast =

Rural locality in Kursk Oblast, Russia

Krasnaya Sloboda Красная Слобода
- Selo
- Interactive map of Krasnaya Sloboda
- Location of Krasnaya Sloboda Krasnaya Sloboda (Kursk Oblast)
- Coordinates: 51°50′23″N 35°08′45″E
- Country: Russia
- Federal subject: Kursk Oblast
- Administrative district: Konyshyovsky District
- SelsovietSelsoviet: Platavsky

Population (2010 Census)
  - Total: 74
  - Estimate (2010): 74 (0%)

Municipal status
  - Municipal district: Konyshyovsky Municipal District
  - Rural settlement: Platavsky Selsoviet Rural Settlement
- Time zone: UTC+3 (MSK)
- Postal code: 307633
- Dialing code: +7 47156
- OKTMO ID: 38616436116
- Website: platavskii.ru

Krasnaya Sloboda (Russian: Красная Слобода) is a rural locality (Russian: село, lit. 'village') in Platavsky Selsoviet Rural Settlement, Konyshyovsky District, Kursk Oblast, Russia. Population: 74 (2010 census); 123 (2002 census);

== Geography ==
The village is located on the Suzhavitsa River (a left tributary of the Svapa River), 49 km from the Russia–Ukraine border, 72 km north-west of Kursk, 9.5 km west of the district center – the urban-type settlement Konyshyovka, 4 km from the selsoviet center – Kashara.

Climate

Krasnaya Sloboda has a warm-summer humid continental climate (Dfb in the Köppen climate classification).

Climate data for Krasnaya Sloboda
Month	Jan	Feb	Mar	Apr	May	Jun	Jul	Aug	Sep	Oct	Nov	Dec	Year
Mean daily maximum °C (°F)	−3.8 (25.2)	−2.8 (27.0)	3.1 (37.6)	13.2 (55.8)	19.5 (67.1)	22.8 (73.0)	25.2 (77.4)	24.6 (76.3)	18.3 (64.9)	10.7 (51.3)	3.6 (38.5)	−0.9 (30.4)	11.1 (52.0)
Daily mean °C (°F)	−5.9 (21.4)	−5.3 (22.5)	−0.5 (31.1)	8.4 (47.1)	14.8 (58.6)	18.5 (65.3)	20.9 (69.6)	20 (68)	14.1 (57.4)	7.4 (45.3)	1.4 (34.5)	−2.9 (26.8)	7.6 (45.6)
Mean daily minimum °C (°F)	−8.3 (17.1)	−8.5 (16.7)	−4.6 (23.7)	2.9 (37.2)	9.2 (48.6)	13.1 (55.6)	15.9 (60.6)	14.9 (58.8)	9.9 (49.8)	4.1 (39.4)	−0.9 (30.4)	−5.1 (22.8)	3.6 (38.4)
Average precipitation mm (inches)	50 (2.0)	44 (1.7)	48 (1.9)	50 (2.0)	63 (2.5)	71 (2.8)	77 (3.0)	54 (2.1)	57 (2.2)	57 (2.2)	48 (1.9)	49 (1.9)	668 (26.2)
Source: https://en.climate-data.org/asia/russian-federation/kursk-oblast/красная-слобода-521325/

== Transport ==
Krasnaya Sloboda is located 46 km from the federal route M-3 Ukraine Highway, 53 km from the route M-2 Crimea Highway, 34 km from the route A-142 (Trosna – M3 highway), 25 km from the road of regional importance 38K-038 (Fatezh – Dmitriyev), 9.5 km from the road 38K-005 (Konyshyovka – Zhigayevo – 38K-038), 22.5 km from the road 38K-017 (Kursk – Lgov – Rylsk – border with Ukraine), 7 km from the road 38K-023 (Lgov – Konyshyovka), 2 km from the road of intermunicipal significance 38H-144 (Konyshyovka – Makaro-Petrovskoye, with the access road to the villages of Belyayevo and Chernicheno), on the road 38Н-152 (38N-144 – Shustovo – Korobkino), 9.5 km from the nearest railway station Konyshyovka (railway line Navlya – Lgov-Kiyevsky).

The rural locality is situated 79 km from Kursk Vostochny Airport, 165 km from Belgorod International Airport and 282 km from Voronezh Peter the Great Airport.
