= Kirpichny, Kursk Oblast =

Rural locality in Kursk Oblast, Russia

Kirpichny Кирпичный
- Khutor
- Interactive map of Kirpichny
- Location of Kirpichny Kirpichny (Kursk Oblast)
- Coordinates: 51°43′36″N 35°03′53″E
- Country: Russia
- Federal subject: Kursk Oblast
- Administrative district: Lgovsky District
- SelsovietSelsoviet: Gustomoysky

Population (2010 Census)
  - Total: 9
  - Estimate (2010): 9 (0%)

Municipal status
  - Municipal district: Lgovsky Municipal District
  - Rural settlement: Gustomoysky Selsoviet Rural Settlement
- Time zone: UTC+3 (MSK)
- Postal code: 307724
- Dialing code: +7 47140
- OKTMO ID: 38622424131
- Website: gustomoy.rkursk.ru

Kirpichny (Russian: Кирпичный) is a rural locality (a khutor) in Gustomoysky Selsoviet Rural Settlement, Lgovsky District, Kursk Oblast, Russia. Population: 9 (2010 census); 38 (2002 census);

== Geography ==
The khutor is located on the Seym River (a left tributary of the Desna), 43 km from the Russia–Ukraine border, 77 km west of Kursk, 14 km north-west of the district center – the town Lgov, 10 km from the selsoviet center – Gustomoy.

Climate

Kirpichny has a warm-summer humid continental climate (Dfb in the Köppen climate classification).

== Transport ==
Kirpichny is located 10 km from the road of regional importance 38K-017 (Kursk – Lgov – Rylsk – border with Ukraine) as part of the European route E38, 12.5 km from the road 38K-023 (Lgov – Konyshyovka), 16.5 km from the road of intermunicipal significance 38H-144 (Konyshyovka – Makaro-Petrovskoye, with the access road to the villages of Belyayevo and Chernicheno), 3.5 km from the road 38Н-152 (38N-144 – Shustovo – Korobkino), 13 km from the nearest railway station Sherekino (railway line Navlya – Lgov-Kiyevsky).

The rural locality is situated 84 km from Kursk Vostochny Airport, 158 km from Belgorod International Airport and 287 km from Voronezh Peter the Great Airport.
