= Kholm, Kursk Oblast =

Rural locality in Kursk Oblast, Russia

Kholm Холм
- Khutor
- Interactive map of Kholm
- Location of Kholm Kholm (Kursk Oblast)
- Coordinates: 51°43′22″N 35°05′21″E
- Country: Russia
- Federal subject: Kursk Oblast
- Administrative district: Lgovsky District
- SelsovietSelsoviet: Gustomoysky

Population (2010 Census)
  - Total: 9
  - Estimate (2010): 9 (0%)

Municipal status
  - Municipal district: Lgovsky Municipal District
  - Rural settlement: Gustomoysky Selsoviet Rural Settlement
- Time zone: UTC+3 (MSK)
- Postal code: 307724
- Dialing code: +7 47140
- OKTMO ID: 38622424156
- Website: gustomoy.rkursk.ru

Kholm (Russian: Холм) is a rural locality (a khutor) in Gustomoysky Selsoviet Rural Settlement, Lgovsky District, Kursk Oblast, Russia. Population: 9 (2010 census); 14 (2002 census);

== Geography ==
The khutor is located on the Prutishche River (a left tributary of the Seym), 45 km from the Russia–Ukraine border, 76 km west of Kursk, 12 km north-west of the district center – the town Lgov, 10 km from the selsoviet center – Gustomoy.

Climate

Kholm has a warm-summer humid continental climate (Dfb in the Köppen climate classification).

== Transport ==
Kholm is located 10 km from the road of regional importance 38K-017 (Kursk – Lgov – Rylsk – border with Ukraine) as part of the European route E38, 11 km from the road 38K-023 (Lgov – Konyshyovka), 16 km from the road of intermunicipal significance 38H-144 (Konyshyovka – Makaro-Petrovskoye, with the access road to the villages of Belyayevo and Chernicheno), 5 km from the road 38Н-152 (38N-144 – Shustovo – Korobkino), 11.5 km from the nearest railway station Sherekino (railway line Navlya – Lgov-Kiyevsky).

The rural locality is situated 82.5 km from Kursk Vostochny Airport, 158 km from Belgorod International Airport and 286 km from Voronezh Peter the Great Airport.
