= Khatusha, Konyshyovsky District, Kursk Oblast =

Rural locality in Kursk Oblast, Russia

Кhatusha Хатуша
- Village
- Interactive map of Кhatusha
- Location of Кhatusha Кhatusha (Kursk Oblast)
- Coordinates: 51°56′29″N 35°05′10″E
- Country: Russia
- Federal subject: Kursk Oblast
- Administrative district: Konyshyovsky District
- SelsovietSelsoviet: Naumovsky

Population (2010 Census)
  - Total: 18
  - Estimate (2010): 18 (0%)

Municipal status
  - Municipal district: Konyshyovsky Municipal District
  - Rural settlement: Naumovsky Selsoviet Rural Settlement
- Time zone: UTC+3 (MSK)
- Postal code: 307601
- Dialing code: +7 47156
- OKTMO ID: 38616432126
- Website: naumovsky.ru

Кhatusha (Russian: Хатуша) is a rural locality (Russian: деревня, lit. 'village') in Naumovsky Selsoviet Rural Settlement, Konyshyovsky District, Kursk Oblast, Russia. Population: 18 (2010 census); 49 (2002 census);

== Geography ==
The village is located on the Chmacha River (a left tributary of the Svapa River), 48 km from the Russia–Ukraine border, 79 km north-west of Kursk, 17.5 km north-west of the district center – the urban-type settlement Konyshyovka, 5 km from the selsoviet center – Naumovka.

Climate

Кhatusha has a warm-summer humid continental climate (Dfb in the Köppen climate classification).

== Transport ==
Кhatusha is located 41 km from the federal route M-3 Ukraine Highway, 52.5 km from the route M-2 Crimea Highway, 23 km from the route A-142 (Trosna – M3 highway), 8 km from the road of regional importance 38K-003 (Dmitriyev – Beryoza – Menshikovo – Khomutovka), on the road of intermunicipal significance 38H-144 (Konyshyovka – Makaro-Petrovskoye, with the access road to the villages of Belyayevo and Chernicheno), 7 km from the nearest railway halt 536 km (railway line Navlya – Lgov-Kiyevsky).

The rural locality is situated 85 km from Kursk Vostochny Airport, 176 km from Belgorod International Airport and 285 km from Voronezh Peter the Great Airport.
