= Arbuzovo, Konyshyovsky District, Kursk Oblast =

Rural locality in Kursk Oblast, Russia

Arbuzovo Арбузово
- Settlement
- Interactive map of Arbuzovo
- Location of Arbuzovo Arbuzovo (Kursk Oblast)
- Coordinates: 52°01′07″N 35°06′54″E
- Country: Russia
- Federal subject: Kursk Oblast
- Administrative district: Konyshyovsky District
- SelsovietSelsoviet: Starobelitsky

Population (2010 Census)
  - Total: 89
  - Estimate (2010): 89 (0%)

Municipal status
  - Municipal district: Konyshyovsky Municipal District
  - Rural settlement: Starobelitsky Selsoviet Rural Settlement
- Time zone: UTC+3 (MSK)
- Postal code: 307602
- Dialing code: +7 47156
- OKTMO ID: 38616444106
- Website: старобелицкий.рф

Arbuzovo (Russian: Арбузово) is a rural locality (a settlement at the railway station) in Starobelitsky Selsoviet Rural Settlement, Konyshyovsky District, Kursk Oblast, Russia. Population: 89 (2010 census); 138 (2002 census);

== Geography ==
The settlement is located 53 km from the Russia–Ukraine border, 80 km north-west of Kursk, 23 km north-west of the district center – the urban-type settlement Konyshyovka, 4 km from the selsoviet center – Staraya Belitsa.

Climate

Arbuzovo has a warm-summer humid continental climate (Dfb in the Köppen climate classification).

== Transport ==
Arbuzovo is located 44 km from the federal route M-3 Ukraine Highway, 49 km from the route M-2 Crimea Highway, 17 km from the route A-142 (Trosna – M3 highway), 6 km from the road of regional importance 38K-038 (Fatezh – Dmitriyev), 19 km from the road 38K-005 (Konyshyovka – Zhigayevo – 38K-038), 5.5 km from the road 38K-003 (Dmitriyev – Beryoza – Menshikovo – Khomutovka), 5 km from the road of intermunicipal significance 38Н-146 (38N-144 – Oleshenka with the access road to Naumovka), on the road 38Н-150 (38N-146 – Arbuzovo – Budanovsky). There is a railway station Arbuzovo in the area of the settlement (railway lines Navlya – Lgov-Kiyevsky and Arbuzovo – Luzhki-Orlovskiye).

The rural locality is situated 85.5 km from Kursk Vostochny Airport, 182 km from Belgorod International Airport and 284 km from Voronezh Peter the Great Airport.
