= Verkhneye Pesochnoye =

Rural locality in Kursk Oblast, Russia

Verkhneye Pesochnoye Верхнее Песочное
- Village
- Interactive map of Verkhneye Pesochnoye
- Location of Verkhneye Pesochnoye Verkhneye Pesochnoye (Kursk Oblast)
- Coordinates: 51°53′36″N 34°59′49″E
- Country: Russia
- Federal subject: Kursk Oblast
- Administrative district: Konyshyovsky District
- SelsovietSelsoviet: Belyayevsky

Population (2010 Census)
  - Total: 25
  - Estimate (2010): 25 (0%)

Municipal status
  - Municipal district: Konyshyovsky Municipal District
  - Rural settlement: Belyayevsky Selsoviet Rural Settlement
- Time zone: UTC+3 (MSK)
- Postal code: 307632
- Dialing code: +7 47156
- OKTMO ID: 38616404111
- Website: беляевский.рф

Verkhneye Pesochnoye (Russian: Верхнее Песочное) is a rural locality (Russian: деревня, lit. 'village') in Belyayevsky Selsoviet Rural Settlement, Konyshyovsky District, Kursk Oblast, Russia. Population: 25 (2010 census); 44 (2002 census);

== Geography ==
The village is located in the Svapa River basin (right tributary of the Seym River), 40.5 km from the Russia–Ukraine border, 84 km north-west of Kursk, 21 km north-west of the district center – the urban-type settlement Konyshyovka, 8 km from the selsoviet center – Belyayevo.

Climate

Verkhneye Pesochnoye has a warm-summer humid continental climate (Dfb in the Köppen climate classification).

== Transport ==
Verkhneye Pesochnoye is located 35 km from the federal route M-3 Ukraine Highway, 60 km from the route M-2 Crimea Highway, 22.5 km from the route A-142 (Trosna – M3 highway), 22 km from the road of regional importance 38K-038 (Fatezh – Dmitriyev), 22.5 km from the road 38K-005 (Konyshyovka – Zhigayevo – 38K-038), 7 km from the road 38K-003 (Dmitriyev – Beryoza – Menshikovo – Khomutovka), 19 km from the road 38K-023 (Lgov – Konyshyovka), 7.5 km from the road of intermunicipal significance 38H-144 (Konyshyovka – Makaro-Petrovskoye, with the access road to the villages of Belyayevo and Chernicheno), 1 km from the road 38Н-458 (38N-144 – Nischneje Pessotschnoje), 15 km from the nearest railway halt 536 km (railway line Navlya – Lgov-Kiyevsky).

The rural locality is situated 90 km from Kursk Vostochny Airport, 176 km from Belgorod International Airport and 292 km from Voronezh Peter the Great Airport.
