= Nizhneye Pesochnoye =

Rural locality in Kursk Oblast, Russia

Nizhneye Pesochnoye Нижнее Песочное
- Selo
- Interactive map of Nizhneye Pesochnoye
- Location of Nizhneye Pesochnoye Nizhneye Pesochnoye (Kursk Oblast)
- Coordinates: 51°52′47″N 34°57′02″E
- Country: Russia
- Federal subject: Kursk Oblast
- Administrative district: Konyshyovsky District
- SelsovietSelsoviet: Belyayevsky

Population (2010 Census)
  - Total: 71
  - Estimate (2010): 71 (0%)

Municipal status
  - Municipal district: Konyshyovsky Municipal District
  - Rural settlement: Belyayevsky Selsoviet Rural Settlement
- Time zone: UTC+3 (MSK)
- Postal code: 307632
- Dialing code: +7 47156
- OKTMO ID: 38616404126
- Website: беляевский.рф

Nizhneye Pesochnoye (Russian: Нижнее Песочное) is a rural locality (Russian: село, lit. 'village') in Belyayevsky Selsoviet Rural Settlement, Konyshyovsky District, Kursk Oblast, Russia. Population: 71 (2010 census); 113 (2002 census);

== Geography ==
The village is located on the Svapa River (а right tributary of the Seym River), 37 km from the Russia–Ukraine border, 86 km north-west of Kursk, 23 km north-west of the district center – the urban-type settlement Konyshyovka, 11 km from the selsoviet center – Belyayevo.

Climate

Nizhneye Pesochnoye has a warm-summer humid continental climate (Dfb in the Köppen climate classification).

Climate data for Nizhneye Pesochnoye
Month	Jan	Feb	Mar	Apr	May	Jun	Jul	Aug	Sep	Oct	Nov	Dec	Year
Mean daily maximum °C (°F)	−3.9 (25.0)	−2.9 (26.8)	3 (37)	13 (55)	19.3 (66.7)	22.6 (72.7)	25.1 (77.2)	24.4 (75.9)	18.1 (64.6)	10.6 (51.1)	3.5 (38.3)	−1 (30)	11.0 (51.7)
Daily mean °C (°F)	−5.9 (21.4)	−5.4 (22.3)	−0.6 (30.9)	8.2 (46.8)	14.7 (58.5)	18.3 (64.9)	20.8 (69.4)	19.8 (67.6)	14 (57)	7.3 (45.1)	1.3 (34.3)	−2.9 (26.8)	7.5 (45.4)
Mean daily minimum °C (°F)	−8.4 (16.9)	−8.6 (16.5)	−4.8 (23.4)	2.8 (37.0)	9 (48)	13 (55)	15.8 (60.4)	14.7 (58.5)	9.7 (49.5)	4 (39)	−0.9 (30.4)	−5.1 (22.8)	3.4 (38.1)
Average precipitation mm (inches)	50 (2.0)	44 (1.7)	47 (1.9)	51 (2.0)	63 (2.5)	70 (2.8)	81 (3.2)	56 (2.2)	58 (2.3)	57 (2.2)	49 (1.9)	49 (1.9)	675 (26.6)
Source: https://en.climate-data.org/asia/russian-federation/kursk-oblast/nizhneye-pesochnoye-661235/

== Transport ==
Nizhneye Pesochnoye is located 32 km from the federal route M-3 Ukraine Highway, 64 km from the route M-2 Crimea Highway, 22 km from the route A-142 (Trosna – M3 highway), 25.5 km from the road of regional importance 38K-038 (Fatezh – Dmitriyev), 24 km from the road 38K-005 (Konyshyovka – Zhigayevo – 38K-038), 5 km from the road 38K-003 (Dmitriyev – Beryoza – Menshikovo – Khomutovka), 21.5 km from the road 38K-023 (Lgov – Konyshyovka), 11 km from the road of intermunicipal significance 38H-144 (Konyshyovka – Makaro-Petrovskoye, with the access road to the villages of Belyayevo and Chernicheno), on the road 38Н-458 (38N-144 – Nischneje Pessotschnoje), 19 km from the nearest railway halt 536 km (railway line Navlya – Lgov-Kiyevsky).

The rural locality is situated 93 km from Kursk Vostochny Airport, 177 km from Belgorod International Airport and 295 km from Voronezh Peter the Great Airport.
