= Arsenyevka, Konyshyovsky District, Kursk Oblast =

Rural locality in Kursk Oblast, Russia

Arsenyevka Арсеньевка
- Village
- Interactive map of Arsenyevka
- Location of Arsenyevka Arsenyevka (Kursk Oblast)
- Coordinates: 51°56′52″N 35°11′22″E
- Country: Russia
- Federal subject: Kursk Oblast
- Administrative district: Konyshyovsky District
- SelsovietSelsoviet: Naumovsky

Population (2010 Census)
  - Total: 0
  - Estimate (2010): 0 )

Municipal status
  - Municipal district: Konyshyovsky Municipal District
  - Rural settlement: Naumovsky Selsoviet Rural Settlement
- Time zone: UTC+3 (MSK)
- Postal code: 307613
- Dialing code: +7 47156
- OKTMO ID: 38616432136
- Website: naumovsky.ru

Arsenyevka (Russian: Арсеньевка) is a rural locality (Russian: деревня, lit. 'village') in Naumovsky Selsoviet Rural Settlement, Konyshyovsky District, Kursk Oblast, Russia. Population: 0 (2010 census); 7 (2002 census);

== Geography ==
The village is located on the Chmacha River (a left tributary of the Svapa River), 55 km from the Russia–Ukraine border, 72 km north-west of Kursk, 13 km north-west of the district center – the urban-type settlement Konyshyovka, 2 km from the selsoviet center – Naumovka.

Climate

Arsenyevka has a warm-summer humid continental climate (Dfb in the Köppen climate classification).

== Transport ==
Arsenyevka is located 48 km from the federal route M-3 Ukraine Highway, 46 km from the route M-2 Crimea Highway, 26.5 km from the route A-142 (Trosna – M3 highway), 12.5 km from the road of regional importance 38K-038 (Fatezh – Dmitriyev), 10.5 km from the road 38K-005 (Konyshyovka – Zhigayevo – 38K-038), 14 km from the road 38K-003 (Dmitriyev – Beryoza – Menshikovo – Khomutovka), 1.5 km from the road of intermunicipal significance 38Н-467 (Mashkino – railway station Sokovninka near the settlement of the same name – Naumovka), 3 km from the nearest railway halt 543 km (railway line Navlya – Lgov-Kiyevsky).

The rural locality is situated 78 km from Kursk Vostochny Airport, 173 km from Belgorod International Airport and 278 km from Voronezh Peter the Great Airport.
