= Budanovsky =

Rural locality in Kursk Oblast, Russia

Budanovsky Будановский
- Khutor
- Interactive map of Budanovsky
- Location of Budanovsky Budanovsky (Kursk Oblast)
- Coordinates: 52°00′39″N 35°06′14″E
- Country: Russia
- Federal subject: Kursk Oblast
- Administrative district: Konyshyovsky District
- SelsovietSelsoviet: Starobelitsky

Population (2010 Census)
  - Total: 17
  - Estimate (2010): 17 (0%)

Municipal status
  - Municipal district: Konyshyovsky Municipal District
  - Rural settlement: Starobelitsky Selsoviet Rural Settlement
- Time zone: UTC+3 (MSK)
- Postal code: 307602
- Dialing code: +7 47156
- OKTMO ID: 38616444116
- Website: старобелицкий.рф

Budanovsky (Russian: Будановский) is a rural locality (khutor) in Starobelitsky Selsoviet Rural Settlement, Konyshyovsky District, Kursk Oblast, Russia. Population: 17 (2010 census); 37 (2002 census);

== Geography ==
Budanovsky is located on the Belichka River (a left tributary of the Svapa River). It is 51 km from the Russia–Ukraine border, 81 km north-west of Kursk, 22.5 km north-west of the district center – the urban-type settlement Konyshyovka, and 4 km from the selsoviet center – Staraya Belitsa.

Climate

Budanovsky has a warm-summer humid continental climate (Dfb in the Köppen climate classification).

== Transport ==
Budanovsky is located 43 km from the federal route M-3 Ukraine Highway, 50 km from the route M-2 Crimea Highway, 17.5 km from the route A-142 (Trosna – M3 highway), 7 km from the road of regional importance 38K-038 (Fatezh – Dmitriyev), 19 km from the road 38K-005 (Konyshyovka – Zhigayevo – 38K-038), 5 km from the road 38K-003 (Dmitriyev – Beryoza – Menshikovo – Khomutovka), 5.5 km from the road of intermunicipal significance 38Н-146 (38N-144 – Oleshenka with the access road to Naumovka), on the road 38Н-150 (38N-146 – Arbuzovo – Budanovsky), 1 km from the nearest railway station Arbuzovo (railway lines Navlya – Lgov-Kiyevsky and Arbuzovo – Luzhki-Orlovskiye).

The rural locality is situated 86 km from Kursk Vostochny Airport, 182 km from Belgorod International Airport and 285 km from Voronezh Peter the Great Airport.
