= Malakhovo, Konyshyovsky District, Kursk Oblast =

Rural locality in Kursk Oblast, Russia

Malakhovo Малахово
- Selo
- Interactive map of Malakhovo
- Location of Malakhovo Malakhovo (Kursk Oblast)
- Coordinates: 51°53′33″N 35°05′50″E
- Country: Russia
- Federal subject: Kursk Oblast
- Administrative district: Konyshyovsky District
- SelsovietSelsoviet: Belyayevsky

Population (2010 Census)
  - Total: 125
  - Estimate (2010): 125 (0%)

Municipal status
  - Municipal district: Konyshyovsky Municipal District
  - Rural settlement: Belyayevsky Selsoviet Rural Settlement
- Time zone: UTC+3 (MSK)
- Postal code: 307631
- Dialing code: +7 47156
- OKTMO ID: 38616404121
- Website: беляевский.рф

Malakhovo (Russian: Малахово) is a rural locality (Russian: село, lit. 'village') in Belyayevsky Selsoviet Rural Settlement, Konyshyovsky District, Kursk Oblast, Russia. Population: 125 (2010 census); 206 (2002 census);

== Geography ==
The village is located on the Vandarets River (a left tributary of the Svapa River), 47 km from the Russia–Ukraine border, 76 km north-west of Kursk, 14 km north-west of the district center – the urban-type settlement Konyshyovka, 2.5 km from the selsoviet center – Belyayevo.

Climate

Malakhovo has a warm-summer humid continental climate (Dfb in the Köppen climate classification).

Climate data for Malakhovo
Month	Jan	Feb	Mar	Apr	May	Jun	Jul	Aug	Sep	Oct	Nov	Dec	Year
Mean daily maximum °C (°F)	−3.9 (25.0)	−2.9 (26.8)	3 (37)	13.1 (55.6)	19.4 (66.9)	22.7 (72.9)	25.1 (77.2)	24.4 (75.9)	18.1 (64.6)	10.6 (51.1)	3.5 (38.3)	−1 (30)	11.0 (51.8)
Daily mean °C (°F)	−5.9 (21.4)	−5.4 (22.3)	−0.6 (30.9)	8.3 (46.9)	14.7 (58.5)	18.3 (64.9)	20.8 (69.4)	19.8 (67.6)	14 (57)	7.3 (45.1)	1.3 (34.3)	−2.9 (26.8)	7.5 (45.4)
Mean daily minimum °C (°F)	−8.4 (16.9)	−8.6 (16.5)	−4.8 (23.4)	2.8 (37.0)	9.1 (48.4)	13 (55)	15.8 (60.4)	14.7 (58.5)	9.8 (49.6)	4 (39)	−1 (30)	−5.1 (22.8)	3.4 (38.1)
Average precipitation mm (inches)	50 (2.0)	44 (1.7)	47 (1.9)	51 (2.0)	63 (2.5)	70 (2.8)	81 (3.2)	56 (2.2)	58 (2.3)	57 (2.2)	49 (1.9)	49 (1.9)	675 (26.6)
Source: https://en.climate-data.org/asia/russian-federation/kursk-oblast/малахово-660899/

== Transport ==
Malakhovo is located 41 km from the federal route M-3 Ukraine Highway, 54 km from the route M-2 Crimea Highway, 27 km from the route A-142 (Trosna – M3 highway), 20 km from the road of regional importance 38K-038 (Fatezh – Dmitriyev), 15 km from the road 38K-005 (Konyshyovka – Zhigayevo – 38K-038), 11 km from the road 38K-003 (Dmitriyev – Beryoza – Menshikovo – Khomutovka), 12 km from the road 38K-023 (Lgov – Konyshyovka), on the roads of intermunicipal significance 38H-144 (Konyshyovka – Makaro-Petrovskoye, with the access road to the villages of Belyayevo and Chernicheno) and 38Н-458 (38N-144 – Nischneje Pessotschnoje), 10.5 km from the nearest railway halt Grinyovka (railway line Navlya – Lgov-Kiyevsky).

The rural locality is situated 83 km from Kursk Vostochny Airport, 172 km from Belgorod International Airport and 285 km from Voronezh Peter the Great Airport.
