= Peresvetovo-Belitsa =

Rural locality in Kursk Oblast, Russia

Peresvetovo-Belitsa Пересветово-Белица
- Selo
- Interactive map of Peresvetovo-Belitsa
- Location of Peresvetovo-Belitsa Peresvetovo-Belitsa (Kursk Oblast)
- Coordinates: 51°59′43″N 35°12′25″E
- Country: Russia
- Federal subject: Kursk Oblast
- Administrative district: Konyshyovsky District
- SelsovietSelsoviet: Starobelitsky

Population (2010 Census)
  - Total: 95
  - Estimate (2010): 95 (0%)

Municipal status
  - Municipal district: Konyshyovsky Municipal District
  - Rural settlement: Starobelitsky Selsoviet Rural Settlement
- Time zone: UTC+3 (MSK)
- Postal code: 307602
- Dialing code: +7 47156
- OKTMO ID: 38616444136

Peresvetovo-Belitsa (Russian: Пересветово-Белица) is a rural locality (Russian: село, lit. 'village') in Starobelitsky Selsoviet Rural Settlement, Konyshyovsky District, Kursk Oblast, Russia. Population: 95 (2010 census); 156 (2002 census);

== Geography ==
The village is located on the Belichka River (a left tributary of the Svapa River), 57 km from the Russia–Ukraine border, 72 km north-west of Kursk, 17.5 km north-west of the district center – the urban-type settlement Konyshyovka, 1 km from the selsoviet center – Staraya Belitsa.

Climate

Peresvetovo-Belitsa has a warm-summer humid continental climate (Dfb in the Köppen climate classification).

Climate data for Peresvetovo-Belitsa
Month	Jan	Feb	Mar	Apr	May	Jun	Jul	Aug	Sep	Oct	Nov	Dec	Year
Mean daily maximum °C (°F)	−4 (25)	−3.1 (26.4)	2.8 (37.0)	12.9 (55.2)	19.2 (66.6)	22.5 (72.5)	25 (77)	24.3 (75.7)	18 (64)	10.4 (50.7)	3.4 (38.1)	−1.1 (30.0)	10.9 (51.5)
Daily mean °C (°F)	−6.1 (21.0)	−5.6 (21.9)	−0.8 (30.6)	8.1 (46.6)	14.6 (58.3)	18.2 (64.8)	20.7 (69.3)	19.7 (67.5)	13.9 (57.0)	7.2 (45.0)	1.2 (34.2)	−3 (27)	7.3 (45.3)
Mean daily minimum °C (°F)	−8.5 (16.7)	−8.6 (16.5)	−4.9 (23.2)	2.7 (36.9)	9 (48)	12.9 (55.2)	15.7 (60.3)	14.7 (58.5)	9.7 (49.5)	4 (39)	−1 (30)	−5.2 (22.6)	3.4 (38.0)
Average precipitation mm (inches)	51 (2.0)	45 (1.8)	47 (1.9)	51 (2.0)	63 (2.5)	70 (2.8)	80 (3.1)	56 (2.2)	59 (2.3)	58 (2.3)	49 (1.9)	50 (2.0)	679 (26.8)
Source: https://en.climate-data.org/asia/russian-federation/kursk-oblast/пересветово-белица-662736/

== Transport ==
Peresvetovo-Belitsa is located 49 km from the federal route M-3 Ukraine Highway, 42 km from the route M-2 Crimea Highway, 23 km from the route A-142 (Trosna – M3 highway), 8 km from the road of regional importance 38K-038 (Fatezh – Dmitriyev), 12 km from the road 38K-005 (Konyshyovka – Zhigayevo – 38K-038), 13 km from the road 38K-003 (Dmitriyev – Beryoza – Menshikovo – Khomutovka), on the road of intermunicipal significance 38Н-146 (38N-144 – Oleshenka with the access road to Naumovka), 2.5 km from the nearest railway halt Grinyovka (railway line Navlya – Lgov-Kiyevsky).

The rural locality is situated 78 km from Kursk Vostochny Airport, 176 km from Belgorod International Airport and 277 km from Voronezh Peter the Great Airport.
