= Trosti =

Rural locality in Kursk Oblast, Russia

Trosti Трости
- Khutor
- Interactive map of Trosti
- Location of Trosti Trosti (Kursk Oblast)
- Coordinates: 51°47′56″N 35°12′34″E
- Country: Russia
- Federal subject: Kursk Oblast
- Administrative district: Konyshyovsky District
- SelsovietSelsoviet: Prilepsky

Population (2010 Census)
  - Total: 14
  - Estimate (2010): 14 (0%)

Municipal status
  - Municipal district: Konyshyovsky Municipal District
  - Rural settlement: Prilepsky Selsoviet Rural Settlement
- Time zone: UTC+3 (MSK)
- Postal code: 307636
- Dialing code: +7 47156
- OKTMO ID: 38616440131
- Website: prilepy.ru

Trosti (Russian: Трости) is a rural locality (a khutor) in Prilepsky Selsoviet Rural Settlement, Konyshyovsky District, Kursk Oblast, Russia. Population: 14 (2010 census); 23 (2002 census);

== Geography ==
The khutor is located on the Platavka River (a left tributary of the Svapa River), 53 km from the Russia–Ukraine border, 68 km west of Kursk, 7.5 km south-west of the district center – the urban-type settlement Konyshyovka, 7.5 km from the selsoviet center – Prilepy.

Climate

Trosti has a warm-summer humid continental climate (Dfb in the Köppen climate classification).

== Transport ==
Trosti is located 51 km from the federal route M-3 Ukraine Highway, 53.5 km from the route M-2 Crimea Highway, 40 km from the route A-142 (Trosna – M3 highway), 29.5 km from the road of regional importance 38K-038 (Fatezh – Dmitriyev), 6.5 km from the road 38K-005 (Konyshyovka – Zhigayevo – 38K-038), 1.5 km from the road 38K-023 (Lgov – Konyshyovka), 1.5 km from the road of intermunicipal significance 38Н-729 (Shirkovo – Khrylyovka – Shustovo), 5.5 km from the nearest railway halt Maritsa (railway line Navlya – Lgov-Kiyevsky).

The rural locality is situated 74 km from Kursk Vostochny Airport, 159 km from Belgorod International Airport and 277 km from Voronezh Peter the Great Airport.
