= Kusakovo-Belitsa =

Rural locality in Kursk Oblast, Russia

Kusakovo-Belitsa Кусаково-Белица
- Village
- Interactive map of Kusakovo-Belitsa
- Location of Kusakovo-Belitsa Kusakovo-Belitsa (Kursk Oblast)
- Coordinates: 52°00′20″N 35°08′25″E
- Country: Russia
- Federal subject: Kursk Oblast
- Administrative district: Konyshyovsky District
- SelsovietSelsoviet: Starobelitsky

Population (2010 Census)
  - Total: 39
  - Estimate (2010): 39 (0%)

Municipal status
  - Municipal district: Konyshyovsky Municipal District
  - Rural settlement: Starobelitsky Selsoviet Rural Settlement
- Time zone: UTC+3 (MSK)
- Postal code: 307602
- Dialing code: +7 47156
- OKTMO ID: 38616444126
- Website: старобелицкий.рф

Kusakovo-Belitsa (Russian: Кусаково-Белица) is a rural locality (Russian: деревня, lit. 'village') in Starobelitsky Selsoviet Rural Settlement, Konyshyovsky District, Kursk Oblast, Russia. Population: 39 (2010 census); 88 (2002 census);

== Geography ==
The village is located on the Belichka River (a left tributary of the Svapa River), 54 km from the Russia–Ukraine border, 78 km north-west of Kursk, 20 km north-west of the district center – the urban-type settlement Konyshyovka, 1.5 km from the selsoviet center – Staraya Belitsa.

Climate

Kusakovo-Belitsa has a warm-summer humid continental climate (Dfb in the Köppen climate classification).

Climate data for Kusakovo-Belitsa
Month	Jan	Feb	Mar	Apr	May	Jun	Jul	Aug	Sep	Oct	Nov	Dec	Year
Mean daily maximum °C (°F)	−4 (25)	−3 (27)	2.8 (37.0)	13 (55)	19.3 (66.7)	22.6 (72.7)	25.1 (77.2)	24.3 (75.7)	18 (64)	10.5 (50.9)	3.4 (38.1)	−1.1 (30.0)	10.9 (51.6)
Daily mean °C (°F)	−6 (21)	−5.5 (22.1)	−0.8 (30.6)	8.2 (46.8)	14.6 (58.3)	18.3 (64.9)	20.8 (69.4)	19.8 (67.6)	13.9 (57.0)	7.2 (45.0)	1.2 (34.2)	−3 (27)	7.4 (45.3)
Mean daily minimum °C (°F)	−8.5 (16.7)	−8.6 (16.5)	−4.9 (23.2)	2.7 (36.9)	9 (48)	12.9 (55.2)	15.8 (60.4)	14.7 (58.5)	9.7 (49.5)	4 (39)	−1 (30)	−5.2 (22.6)	3.4 (38.0)
Average precipitation mm (inches)	51 (2.0)	45 (1.8)	47 (1.9)	51 (2.0)	63 (2.5)	70 (2.8)	80 (3.1)	56 (2.2)	59 (2.3)	58 (2.3)	49 (1.9)	50 (2.0)	679 (26.8)
Source: https://en.climate-data.org/asia/russian-federation/kursk-oblast/кусаково-белица-663273/

== Transport ==
Kusakovo-Belitsa is located 45.5 km from the federal route M-3 Ukraine Highway, 47 km from the route M-2 Crimea Highway, 19 km from the route A-142 (Trosna – M3 highway), 7 km from the road of regional importance 38K-038 (Fatezh – Dmitriyev), 16 km from the road 38K-005 (Konyshyovka – Zhigayevo – 38K-038), 8 km from the road 38K-003 (Dmitriyev – Beryoza – Menshikovo – Khomutovka), 3 km from the road of intermunicipal significance 38Н-146 (38N-144 – Oleshenka with the access road to Naumovka), on the road 38Н-148 (38N-146 – Kusakovo-Belitsa), 1 km from the nearest railway halt 536 km (railway line Navlya – Lgov-Kiyevsky).

The rural locality is situated 83 km from Kursk Vostochny Airport, 179 km from Belgorod International Airport and 281 km from Voronezh Peter the Great Airport.
