= Yatseno =

Rural locality in Kursk Oblast, Russia

Yatseno Яцено
- Selo
- Interactive map of Yatseno
- Location of Yatseno Yatseno (Kursk Oblast)
- Coordinates: 51°55′53″N 35°21′26″E
- Country: Russia
- Federal subject: Kursk Oblast
- Administrative district: Konyshyovsky District
- SelsovietSelsoviet: Mashkinsky

Population (2010 Census)
  - Total: 82
  - Estimate (2010): 82 (0%)

Municipal status
  - Municipal district: Konyshyovsky Municipal District
  - Rural settlement: Mashkinsky Selsoviet Rural Settlement
- Time zone: UTC+3 (MSK)
- Postal code: 307610
- Dialing code: +7 47156
- OKTMO ID: 38616428131
- Website: машкинский.рф

Yatseno (Russian: Яцено) is a rural locality (Russian: село, lit. 'village') in Mashkinsky Selsoviet Rural Settlement, Konyshyovsky District, Kursk Oblast, Russia. Population: 82 (2010 census); 160 (2002 census);

== Geography ==
The village is located on the Belichka River (a left tributary of the Svapa River), 66 km from the Russia–Ukraine border, 61 km north-west of Kursk, 11 km north-east of the district center – the urban-type settlement Konyshyovka, 3 km from the selsoviet center – Mashkino.

Climate

Yatseno has a warm-summer humid continental climate (Dfb in the Köppen climate classification).

== Transport ==
Yatseno is located 59.5 km from the federal route M-3 Ukraine Highway, 36 km from the route M-2 Crimea Highway, 33 km from the route A-142 (Trosna – M3 highway), 16 km from the road of regional importance 38K-038 (Fatezh – Dmitriyev), on the road 38K-005 (Konyshyovka – Zhigayevo – 38K-038), on the road of intermunicipal significance 38Н-141 (38K-005 – Verkhoprudka), 4.5 km from the nearest railway halt 552 km (railway line Navlya – Lgov-Kiyevsky).

The rural locality is situated 67 km from Kursk Vostochny Airport, 165 km from Belgorod International Airport and 267 km from Voronezh Peter the Great Airport.
