= Bogdanovka =

Bogdanovka may refer to:

- Bogdanovka concentration camp, a World War II concentration camp set up by Romanian occupation troops in south-western Ukraine
- Norashen, Lori, Armenia, formerly Bogdanovka
- Ninotsminda, a village in southern Georgia in the Caucasus, formerly Bogdanovka
- Bogdanovka, Konyshyovsky District, Kursk Oblast, Russia

== See also ==
- Bohdanivka (disambiguation)
