= Grinyovka, Kursk Oblast =

Rural locality in Kursk Oblast, Russia

Grinyovka Гринёвка
- Village
- Interactive map of Grinyovka
- Location of Grinyovka Grinyovka (Kursk Oblast)
- Coordinates: 51°59′26″N 35°06′27″E
- Country: Russia
- Federal subject: Kursk Oblast
- Administrative district: Konyshyovsky District
- SelsovietSelsoviet: Starobelitsky

Population (2010 Census)
  - Total: 0
  - Estimate (2010): 0 )

Municipal status
  - Municipal district: Konyshyovsky Municipal District
  - Rural settlement: Starobelitsky Selsoviet Rural Settlement
- Time zone: UTC+3 (MSK)
- Postal code: 307602
- Dialing code: +7 47156
- OKTMO ID: 38616444121
- Website: старобелицкий.рф

Grinyovka (Russian: Гринёвка) is a rural locality (Russian: деревня, lit. 'village') in Starobelitsky Selsoviet Rural Settlement, Konyshyovsky District, Kursk Oblast, Russia. Population: 0 (2010 census); 8 (2002 census);

== Geography ==
The village is located 51 km from the Russia–Ukraine border, 79 km north-west of Kursk, 21 km north-west of the district center – the urban-type settlement Konyshyovka, 4 km from the selsoviet center – Staraya Belitsa.

Climate

Grinyovka has a warm-summer humid continental climate (Dfb in the Köppen climate classification).

== Transport ==
Grinyovka is located 43 km from the federal route M-3 Ukraine Highway, 50 km from the route M-2 Crimea Highway, 19 km from the route A-142 (Trosna – M3 highway), 9 km from the road of regional importance 38K-038 (Fatezh – Dmitriyev), 17.5 km from the road 38K-005 (Konyshyovka – Zhigayevo – 38K-038), 6 km from the road 38K-003 (Dmitriyev – Beryoza – Menshikovo – Khomutovka), 5 km from the road of intermunicipal significance 38Н-146 (38N-144 – Oleshenka with the access road to Naumovka), on the road 38Н-147 (38N-146 – Staraya Belitsa – Bely Klyuch – Grinyovka), 2.5 km from the nearest railway halt 536 km (railway line Navlya – Lgov-Kiyevsky).

The rural locality is situated 85 km from Kursk Vostochny Airport, 180 km from Belgorod International Airport and 284 km from Voronezh Peter the Great Airport.
