= Gornostayevka, Lgovsky District, Kursk Oblast =

Rural locality in Kursk Oblast, Russia

Gornostayevka Горностаевка
- Village
- Interactive map of Gornostayevka
- Location of Gornostayevka Gornostayevka (Kursk Oblast)
- Coordinates: 51°39′17″N 35°00′52″E
- Country: Russia
- Federal subject: Kursk Oblast
- Administrative district: Lgovsky District
- SelsovietSelsoviet: Gustomoysky

Population (2010 Census)
  - Total: 13
  - Estimate (2010): 13 (0%)

Municipal status
  - Municipal district: Lgovsky Municipal District
  - Rural settlement: Gustomoysky Selsoviet Rural Settlement
- Time zone: UTC+3 (MSK)
- Postal code: 307721
- Dialing code: +7 47140
- OKTMO ID: 38622424106
- Website: gustomoy.rkursk.ru

Gornostayevka (Russian: Горностаевка) is a rural locality (Russian: деревня, lit. 'village') in Gustomoysky Selsoviet Rural Settlement, Lgovsky District, Kursk Oblast, Russia. Population: 13 (2010 census); 53 (2002 census);

== Geography ==
The village is located on the Gustomoy River in the basin of the Seym, 41 km from the Russia–Ukraine border, 82 km south-west of Kursk, 16 km west of the district centre, Lgov and 3.5 km from the selsoviet centre, Gustomoy.

Climate

Gornostayevka has a warm-summer humid continental climate (Dfb in the Köppen climate classification).

== Transport ==
Gornostayevka is located 4 km from the road of regional importance 38K-017 (Kursk – Lgov – Rylsk – border with Ukraine) as part of the European route E38, 1.5 km from the road of intermunicipal significance 38H-354 (38K-017 – Zeleninsky) and 11 km from the nearest railway station 387 km (railway line 322 km – Lgov I).

The rural locality is situated 88 km from Kursk Vostochny Airport, 156 km from Belgorod International Airport and 292 km from Voronezh Peter the Great Airport.
