= Khrylyovka =

Rural locality in Kursk Oblast, Russia

Khrylyovka Хрылёвка
- Village
- Interactive map of Khrylyovka
- Location of Khrylyovka Khrylyovka (Kursk Oblast)
- Coordinates: 51°47′38″N 35°10′26″E
- Country: Russia
- Federal subject: Kursk Oblast
- Administrative district: Konyshyovsky District
- SelsovietSelsoviet: Prilepsky

Population (2010 Census)
  - Total: 61
  - Estimate (2010): 61 (0%)

Municipal status
  - Municipal district: Konyshyovsky Municipal District
  - Rural settlement: Prilepsky Selsoviet Rural Settlement
- Time zone: UTC+3 (MSK)
- Postal code: 307636
- Dialing code: +7 47156
- OKTMO ID: 38616440136
- Website: prilepy.ru

Khrylyovka (Russian: Хрылёвка) is a rural locality (Russian: деревня, lit. 'village') in Prilepsky Selsoviet Rural Settlement, Konyshyovsky District, Kursk Oblast, Russia. Population: 61 (2010 census); 117 (2002 census);

== Geography ==
The village is located on the Platavka River (a left tributary of the Svapa River), 50 km from the Russia–Ukraine border, 70 km north-west of Kursk, 9 km south-west of the district center – the urban-type settlement Konyshyovka, 9.5 km from the selsoviet center – Prilepy.

Climate

Khrylyovka has a warm-summer humid continental climate (Dfb in the Köppen climate classification).

== Transport ==
Khrylyovka is located 55.5 km from the federal route M-2 Crimea Highway, 30 km from the road of regional importance 38K-038 (Fatezh – Dmitriyev), 8.5 km from the road 38K-005 (Konyshyovka – Zhigayevo – 38K-038), 3 km from the road 38K-023 (Lgov – Konyshyovka), on the road of intermunicipal significance 38Н-729 (Shirkovo – Khrylyovka – Shustovo), 6 km from the nearest railway halt Maritsa (railway line Navlya – Lgov-Kiyevsky).

The rural locality is situated 76 km from Kursk Vostochny Airport, 159 km from Belgorod International Airport and 278 km from Voronezh Peter the Great Airport.
