= Iznoskovo, Lgovsky District, Kursk Oblast =

Rural locality in Kursk Oblast, Russia

Iznoskovo Износково
- Selo
- Interactive map of Iznoskovo
- Location of Iznoskovo Iznoskovo (Kursk Oblast)
- Coordinates: 51°34′33″N 35°05′52″E
- Country: Russia
- Federal subject: Kursk Oblast
- Administrative district: Lgovsky District
- SelsovietSelsoviet: Gustomoysky

Population (2010 Census)
  - Total: 205
  - Estimate (2010): 205 (0%)

Municipal status
  - Municipal district: Lgovsky Municipal District
  - Rural settlement: Gustomoysky Selsoviet Rural Settlement
- Time zone: UTC+3 (MSK)
- Postal code: 307711
- Dialing code: +7 47140
- OKTMO ID: 38622424161
- Website: gustomoy.rkursk.ru

Iznoskovo (Russian: Износково) is a rural locality (Russian: село, lit. 'village') in Gustomoysky Selsoviet Rural Settlement, Lgovsky District, Kursk Oblast, Russia. Population: 205 (2010 census); 337 (2002 census);

== Geography ==
The village is located on the Gustomoy River in the basin of the Seym, 38 km from the Russia–Ukraine border, 77 km south-west of Kursk, 12 km south-west of the district center – the town Lgov, 5 km from the selsoviet center – Gustomoy.

Climate

Iznoskovo has a warm-summer humid continental climate (Dfb in the Köppen climate classification).

Climate data for Iznoskovo
Month	Jan	Feb	Mar	Apr	May	Jun	Jul	Aug	Sep	Oct	Nov	Dec	Year
Mean daily maximum °C (°F)	−3.7 (25.3)	−2.7 (27.1)	3.3 (37.9)	13.3 (55.9)	19.5 (67.1)	22.7 (72.9)	25.2 (77.4)	24.6 (76.3)	18.3 (64.9)	10.7 (51.3)	3.7 (38.7)	−0.9 (30.4)	11.2 (52.1)
Daily mean °C (°F)	−5.8 (21.6)	−5.2 (22.6)	−0.3 (31.5)	8.4 (47.1)	14.8 (58.6)	18.4 (65.1)	20.9 (69.6)	20 (68)	14.1 (57.4)	7.4 (45.3)	1.4 (34.5)	−2.8 (27.0)	7.6 (45.7)
Mean daily minimum °C (°F)	−8.2 (17.2)	−8.3 (17.1)	−4.4 (24.1)	2.9 (37.2)	9.2 (48.6)	13.1 (55.6)	15.8 (60.4)	14.8 (58.6)	9.8 (49.6)	4.1 (39.4)	−0.9 (30.4)	−5 (23)	3.6 (38.4)
Average precipitation mm (inches)	50 (2.0)	44 (1.7)	48 (1.9)	50 (2.0)	63 (2.5)	70 (2.8)	79 (3.1)	52 (2.0)	57 (2.2)	56 (2.2)	47 (1.9)	48 (1.9)	664 (26.2)
Source: https://en.climate-data.org/asia/russian-federation/kursk-oblast/износково-317696/

== Transport ==
Iznoskovo is located 4 km from the road of regional importance 38K-017 (Kursk – Lgov – Rylsk – border with Ukraine) as part of the European route E38, on the road of intermunicipal significance 38H-372 (38K-017 – Stremoukhovka – Iznoskovo), 2 km from the nearest railway halt Kolontayevka (railway line 322 km – Lgov I).

The rural locality is situated 85 km from Kursk Vostochny Airport, 146 km from Belgorod International Airport and 287 km from Voronezh Peter the Great Airport.
