= Sokovninka, Kursk Oblast =

Rural locality in Kursk Oblast, Russia

Sokovninka Соковнинка
- Settlement
- Interactive map of Sokovninka
- Location of Sokovninka Sokovninka (Kursk Oblast)
- Coordinates: 51°56′04″N 35°16′21″E
- Country: Russia
- Federal subject: Kursk Oblast
- Administrative district: Konyshyovsky District
- SelsovietSelsoviet: Naumovsky

Population (2010 Census)
  - Total: 14
  - Estimate (2010): 14 (0%)

Municipal status
  - Municipal district: Konyshyovsky Municipal District
  - Rural settlement: Naumovsky Selsoviet Rural Settlement
- Time zone: UTC+3 (MSK)
- Postal code: 307613
- Dialing code: +7 47156
- OKTMO ID: 38616432151
- Website: naumovsky.ru

Sokovninka (Russian: Соковнинка) is a rural locality (a settlement at the passing loop) in Naumovsky Selsoviet Rural Settlement, Konyshyovsky District, Kursk Oblast, Russia. Population: 14 (2010 census); 22 (2002 census);

== Geography ==
The settlement is located 2 km from the source of the Chmacha River (a left tributary of the Svapa River), 60 km from the Russia–Ukraine border, 67 km north-west of Kursk, 10 km north-west of the district center – the urban-type settlement Konyshyovka, 7.5 km from the selsoviet center – Naumovka.

Climate

Sokovninka has a warm-summer humid continental climate (Dfb in the Köppen climate classification).

== Transport ==
Sokovninka is located 54 km from the federal route M-3 Ukraine Highway, 41 km from the route M-2 Crimea Highway, 29.5 km from the route A-142 (Trosna – M3 highway), 14.5 km from the road of regional importance 38K-038 (Fatezh – Dmitriyev), 5 km from the road 38K-005 (Konyshyovka – Zhigayevo – 38K-038), 19 km from the road 38K-003 (Dmitriyev – Beryoza – Menshikovo – Khomutovka), on the road of intermunicipal significance 38Н-467 (Mashkino – railway station Sokovninka near the settlement of the same name – Naumovka). There is a railway station Sokovninka in the area of the settlement (railway line Navlya – Lgov-Kiyevsky).

The rural locality is situated 72 km from Kursk Vostochny Airport, 168 km from Belgorod International Airport and 272 km from Voronezh Peter the Great Airport.
