= Forsov =

Rural locality in Kursk Oblast, Russia

Forsov Форсов
- Khutor
- Interactive map of Forsov
- Location of Forsov Forsov (Kursk Oblast)
- Coordinates: 51°58′37″N 35°20′31″E
- Country: Russia
- Federal subject: Kursk Oblast
- Administrative district: Konyshyovsky District
- SelsovietSelsoviet: Mashkinsky

Population (2010 Census)
  - Total: 7
  - Estimate (2010): 7 (0%)

Municipal status
  - Municipal district: Konyshyovsky Municipal District
  - Rural settlement: Mashkinsky Selsoviet Rural Settlement
- Time zone: UTC+3 (MSK)
- Postal code: 307610
- Dialing code: +7 47156
- OKTMO ID: 38616428126
- Website: машкинский.рф

Forsov (Russian: Форсов) is a rural locality (a khutor) in Mashkinsky Selsoviet Rural Settlement, Konyshyovsky District, Kursk Oblast, Russia. Population: 7 (2010 census); 10 (2002 census);

== Geography ==
The khutor is located in the Belichka River basin (a left tributary of the Svapa River), 66.5 km from the Russia–Ukraine border, 64 km north-west of Kursk, 16 km north-east of the district center – the urban-type settlement Konyshyovka, 4 km from the selsoviet center – Mashkino.

Climate

Forsov has a warm-summer humid continental climate (Dfb in the Köppen climate classification).

== Transport ==
Forsov is located 59 km from the federal route M-3 Ukraine Highway, 34 km from the route M-2 Crimea Highway, 28 km from the route A-142 (Trosna – M3 highway), 11 km from the road of regional importance 38K-038 (Fatezh – Dmitriyev), 4 km from the road 38K-005 (Konyshyovka – Zhigayevo – 38K-038), on the road of intermunicipal significance 38Н-468 (Mashkino – Forsov), 7 km from the nearest railway station Sokovninka (railway line Navlya – Lgov-Kiyevsky).

The rural locality is situated 69 km from Kursk Vostochny Airport, 170 km from Belgorod International Airport and 267 km from Voronezh Peter the Great Airport.
