= Bohdanivka =

Bohdanivka (Ukrainian: Богданiвка) may refer to several populated places in Ukraine:

- Bohdanivka, Pavlohrad Raion, Dnipropetrovsk Oblast, a village near Ternivka
- Bohdanivka, Bakhmut Raion, Donetsk Oblast, a village
- Bohdanivka, Volnovakha Raion, Donetsk Oblast, a village
- Bohdanivka, Boryspil Raion, Kyiv Oblast, a village
- Bohdanivka, Luhansk Oblast, a village

== See also ==
- Bogdanovka (disambiguation)
