= Stremoukhovka =

Rural locality in Kursk Oblast, Russia

Stremoukhovka Стремоуховка
- Village
- Interactive map of Stremoukhovka
- Location of Stremoukhovka Stremoukhovka (Kursk Oblast)
- Coordinates: 51°36′18″N 35°04′57″E
- Country: Russia
- Federal subject: Kursk Oblast
- Administrative district: Lgovsky District
- SelsovietSelsoviet: Gustomoysky

Population (2010 Census)
  - Total: 119
  - Estimate (2010): 119 (0%)

Municipal status
  - Municipal district: Lgovsky Municipal District
  - Rural settlement: Gustomoysky Selsoviet Rural Settlement
- Time zone: UTC+3 (MSK)
- Postal code: 307711
- Dialing code: +7 47140
- OKTMO ID: 38622424176
- Website: gustomoy.rkursk.ru

Stremoukhovka (Russian: Стремоуховка) is a rural locality (Russian: деревня, lit. 'village') in Gustomoysky Selsoviet Rural Settlement, Lgovsky District, Kursk Oblast, Russia. Population: 119 (2010 census); 157 (2002 census);

== Geography ==
The village is located on the Gustomoy River in the basin of the Seym, 46 km from the Russia–Ukraine border, 78 km south-west of Kursk, 12 km south-west of the district center – the town Lgov, 2 km from the selsoviet center – Gustomoy.

Climate

Stremoukhovka has a warm-summer humid continental climate (Dfb in the Köppen climate classification).

Climate data for Stremoukhovka
Month	Jan	Feb	Mar	Apr	May	Jun	Jul	Aug	Sep	Oct	Nov	Dec	Year
Mean daily maximum °C (°F)	−3.7 (25.3)	−2.7 (27.1)	3.3 (37.9)	13.3 (55.9)	19.5 (67.1)	22.7 (72.9)	25.2 (77.4)	24.6 (76.3)	18.3 (64.9)	10.7 (51.3)	3.7 (38.7)	−0.9 (30.4)	11.2 (52.1)
Daily mean °C (°F)	−5.8 (21.6)	−5.2 (22.6)	−0.3 (31.5)	8.4 (47.1)	14.8 (58.6)	18.4 (65.1)	20.9 (69.6)	20 (68)	14.1 (57.4)	7.4 (45.3)	1.4 (34.5)	−2.8 (27.0)	7.6 (45.7)
Mean daily minimum °C (°F)	−8.2 (17.2)	−8.3 (17.1)	−4.4 (24.1)	2.9 (37.2)	9.2 (48.6)	13.1 (55.6)	15.8 (60.4)	14.8 (58.6)	9.8 (49.6)	4.1 (39.4)	−0.9 (30.4)	−5 (23)	3.6 (38.4)
Average precipitation mm (inches)	50 (2.0)	44 (1.7)	48 (1.9)	50 (2.0)	63 (2.5)	70 (2.8)	79 (3.1)	52 (2.0)	57 (2.2)	56 (2.2)	47 (1.9)	48 (1.9)	664 (26.2)
Source: https://en.climate-data.org/asia/russian-federation/kursk-oblast/стремоуховка-653910/

== Transport ==
Stremoukhovka is located 2 km from the road of regional importance 38K-017 (Kursk – Lgov – Rylsk – border with Ukraine) as part of the European route E38, on the road of intermunicipal significance 38H-372 (38K-017 – Stremoukhovka – Iznoskovo), 5 km from the nearest railway halt 387 km (railway line 322 km – Lgov I).

The rural locality is situated 85 km from Kursk Vostochny Airport, 150 km from Belgorod International Airport and 288 km from Voronezh Peter the Great Airport.
