= Norashen, Lori =

Norashen Նորաշեն
- Location within Armenia
- Coordinates: 41°11′17″N 44°19′38″E
- Country: Armenia
- Marz (Province): Lori
- Elevation: 1,575 m (5,167 ft)

Population (2011)
  - Total: 1,201
- Time zone: UTC+4 ( )
  - Summer (DST): UTC+5 ( )

Norashen (Armenian: Նորաշեն; formerly, Bogdanovka) is a town in the Lori Province of Armenia. The town has a museum and nearby is a fort, dated to the 5th–6th century BCE, which has been excavated.
