= Bogdanovka, Konyshyovsky District, Kursk Oblast =

Rural locality in Kursk Oblast, Russia

Bogdanovka Богдановка
- Village
- Interactive map of Bogdanovka
- Location of Bogdanovka Bogdanovka (Kursk Oblast)
- Coordinates: 51°57′34″N 35°21′35″E
- Country: Russia
- Federal subject: Kursk Oblast
- Administrative district: Konyshyovsky District
- SelsovietSelsoviet: Mashkinsky

Population (2010 Census)
  - Total: 18
  - Estimate (2010): 18 (0%)

Municipal status
  - Municipal district: Konyshyovsky Municipal District
  - Rural settlement: Mashkinsky Selsoviet Rural Settlement
- Time zone: UTC+3 (MSK)
- Postal code: 307610
- Dialing code: +7 47156
- OKTMO ID: 38616428106
- Website: машкинский.рф

Bogdanovka (Russian: Богдановка) is a rural locality (Russian: деревня, lit. 'village') in Mashkinsky Selsoviet Rural Settlement, Konyshyovsky District, Kursk Oblast, Russia. Population: 18 (2010 census); 33 (2002 census);

== Geography ==
The village is located in the Belichka River basin (a left tributary of the Svapa River), 67 km from the Russia–Ukraine border, 62 km north-west of Kursk, 14 km north-east of the district center – the urban-type settlement Konyshyovka, 3 km from the selsoviet center – Mashkino.

Climate

Bogdanovka has a warm-summer humid continental climate (Dfb in the Köppen climate classification).

Climate data for Bogdanovka
Month	Jan	Feb	Mar	Apr	May	Jun	Jul	Aug	Sep	Oct	Nov	Dec	Year
Mean daily maximum °C (°F)	−4.2 (24.4)	−3.2 (26.2)	2.6 (36.7)	12.7 (54.9)	19 (66)	22.3 (72.1)	24.9 (76.8)	24.1 (75.4)	17.8 (64.0)	10.3 (50.5)	3.2 (37.8)	−1.3 (29.7)	10.7 (51.2)
Daily mean °C (°F)	−6.2 (20.8)	−5.7 (21.7)	−0.9 (30.4)	8 (46)	14.4 (57.9)	18.1 (64.6)	20.6 (69.1)	19.6 (67.3)	13.7 (56.7)	7.1 (44.8)	1.1 (34.0)	−3.2 (26.2)	7.2 (45.0)
Mean daily minimum °C (°F)	−8.5 (16.7)	−8.6 (16.5)	−4.9 (23.2)	2.6 (36.7)	8.9 (48.0)	12.8 (55.0)	15.7 (60.3)	14.6 (58.3)	9.6 (49.3)	3.9 (39.0)	−1.1 (30.0)	−5.3 (22.5)	3.3 (38.0)
Average precipitation mm (inches)	51 (2.0)	45 (1.8)	47 (1.9)	51 (2.0)	63 (2.5)	70 (2.8)	80 (3.1)	56 (2.2)	59 (2.3)	58 (2.3)	49 (1.9)	50 (2.0)	679 (26.8)
Source: https://en.climate-data.org/asia/russian-federation/kursk-oblast/богдановка-553484/

== Transport ==
Bogdanovka is located 60 km from the federal route M-3 Ukraine Highway, 35 km from the route M-2 Crimea Highway, 30.5 km from the route A-142 (Trosna – M3 highway), 14 km from the road of regional importance 38K-038 (Fatezh – Dmitriyev), 2 km from the road 38K-005 (Konyshyovka – Zhigayevo – 38K-038), on the road of intermunicipal significance 38Н-466 (Mashkino – Bogdanovka), 6.5 km from the nearest railway station Sokovninka (railway line Navlya – Lgov-Kiyevsky).

The rural locality is situated 68 km from Kursk Vostochny Airport, 168 km from Belgorod International Airport and 266 km from Voronezh Peter the Great Airport.
