= Shirkovo, Konyshyovsky District, Kursk Oblast =

Rural locality in Kursk Oblast, Russia

Shirkovo Ширково
- Selo
- Interactive map of Shirkovo
- Location of Shirkovo Shirkovo (Kursk Oblast)
- Coordinates: 51°46′31″N 35°12′10″E
- Country: Russia
- Federal subject: Kursk Oblast
- Administrative district: Konyshyovsky District
- SelsovietSelsoviet: Prilepsky

Population (2010 Census)
  - Total: 266
  - Estimate (2010): 266 (0%)

Municipal status
  - Municipal district: Konyshyovsky Municipal District
  - Rural settlement: Prilepsky Selsoviet Rural Settlement
- Time zone: UTC+3 (MSK)
- Postal code: 307636
- Dialing code: +7 47156
- OKTMO ID: 38616440121
- Website: prilepy.ru

Shirkovo (Russian: Ширково) is a rural locality (Russian: село, lit. 'village') in Prilepsky Selsoviet Rural Settlement, Konyshyovsky District, Kursk Oblast, Russia. Population: 266 (2010 census); 409 (2002 census);

== Geography ==
The village is located on the Prutishche River in the basin of the Seym, 52.5 km from the Russia–Ukraine border, 66 km west of Kursk, 8.5 km south-west of the district center – the urban-type settlement Konyshyovka, 9 km from the selsoviet center – Prilepy.

Climate

Shirkovo has a warm-summer humid continental climate (Dfb in the Köppen climate classification).

Climate data for Shirkovo
Month	Jan	Feb	Mar	Apr	May	Jun	Jul	Aug	Sep	Oct	Nov	Dec	Year
Mean daily maximum °C (°F)	−3.9 (25.0)	−2.9 (26.8)	3 (37)	13.1 (55.6)	19.4 (66.9)	22.7 (72.9)	25.2 (77.4)	24.5 (76.1)	18.2 (64.8)	10.6 (51.1)	3.5 (38.3)	−1 (30)	11.0 (51.8)
Daily mean °C (°F)	−5.9 (21.4)	−5.4 (22.3)	−0.6 (30.9)	8.3 (46.9)	14.7 (58.5)	18.4 (65.1)	20.9 (69.6)	19.9 (67.8)	14 (57)	7.3 (45.1)	1.3 (34.3)	−2.9 (26.8)	7.5 (45.5)
Mean daily minimum °C (°F)	−8.3 (17.1)	−8.5 (16.7)	−4.6 (23.7)	2.9 (37.2)	9.1 (48.4)	13.1 (55.6)	15.9 (60.6)	14.8 (58.6)	9.8 (49.6)	4.1 (39.4)	−0.9 (30.4)	−5.1 (22.8)	3.5 (38.3)
Average precipitation mm (inches)	50 (2.0)	44 (1.7)	48 (1.9)	50 (2.0)	63 (2.5)	71 (2.8)	77 (3.0)	54 (2.1)	57 (2.2)	57 (2.2)	48 (1.9)	49 (1.9)	668 (26.2)
Source: https://en.climate-data.org/asia/russian-federation/kursk-oblast/shirkovo-654115/

== Transport ==
Shirkovo is located 52 km from the federal route M-3 Ukraine Highway, 53 km from the route M-2 Crimea Highway, 41.5 km from the route A-142 (Trosna – M3 highway), 33 km from the road of regional importance 38K-038 (Fatezh – Dmitriyev), 7 km from the road 38K-005 (Konyshyovka – Zhigayevo – 38K-038), on the road 38K-023 (Lgov – Konyshyovka), on the road of intermunicipal significance 38Н-439 (38K-023 – Shirkovo), 2 km from the nearest railway halt Maritsa (railway line Navlya – Lgov-Kiyevsky).

The rural locality is situated 72 km from Kursk Vostochny Airport, 155 km from Belgorod International Airport and 275 km from Voronezh Peter the Great Airport.
