= Mashkino, Konyshyovsky District, Kursk Oblast =

Rural locality in Kursk Oblast, Russia

Mashkino Машкино
- Selo
- Interactive map of Mashkino
- Location of Mashkino Mashkino (Kursk Oblast)
- Coordinates: 51°57′40″N 35°18′15″E
- Country: Russia
- Federal subject: Kursk Oblast
- Administrative district: Konyshyovsky District
- SelsovietSelsoviet: Mashkinsky

Population (2010 Census)
  - Total: 219
  - Estimate (2010): 219 (0%)

Administrative status
  - Capital of: Mashkinsky Selsoviet

Municipal status
  - Municipal district: Konyshyovsky Municipal District
  - Rural settlement: Mashkinsky Selsoviet Rural Settlement
  - Capital of: Mashkinsky Selsoviet Rural Settlement
- Time zone: UTC+3 (MSK)
- Postal code: 307610
- Dialing code: +7 47156
- OKTMO ID: 38616428101
- Website: машкинский.рф

Mashkino (Russian: Машкино) is a rural locality (Russian: село, lit. 'village') and the administrative center of Mashkinsky Selsoviet Rural Settlement, Konyshyovsky District, Kursk Oblast, Russia. Population: 219 (2010 census); 325 (2002 census);

== Geography ==
The village is located on the Belichka River (a left tributary of the Svapa River), 63.5 km from the Russia–Ukraine border, 66 km north-west of Kursk, 12.5 km north of the district center – the urban-type settlement Konyshyovka.

Climate

Mashkino has a warm-summer humid continental climate (Dfb in the Köppen climate classification).

Climate data for Mashkino
Month	Jan	Feb	Mar	Apr	May	Jun	Jul	Aug	Sep	Oct	Nov	Dec	Year
Mean daily maximum °C (°F)	−4.1 (24.6)	−3.2 (26.2)	2.6 (36.7)	12.8 (55.0)	19.1 (66.4)	22.4 (72.3)	24.9 (76.8)	24.2 (75.6)	17.9 (64.2)	10.3 (50.5)	3.3 (37.9)	−1.2 (29.8)	10.8 (51.3)
Daily mean °C (°F)	−6.1 (21.0)	−5.6 (21.9)	−0.9 (30.4)	8 (46)	14.5 (58.1)	18.1 (64.6)	20.6 (69.1)	19.7 (67.5)	13.8 (56.8)	7.1 (44.8)	1.1 (34.0)	−3.1 (26.4)	7.3 (45.1)
Mean daily minimum °C (°F)	−8.5 (16.7)	−8.6 (16.5)	−4.9 (23.2)	2.6 (36.7)	8.9 (48.0)	12.8 (55.0)	15.7 (60.3)	14.6 (58.3)	9.6 (49.3)	3.9 (39.0)	−1.1 (30.0)	−5.3 (22.5)	3.3 (38.0)
Average precipitation mm (inches)	51 (2.0)	45 (1.8)	47 (1.9)	51 (2.0)	63 (2.5)	70 (2.8)	80 (3.1)	56 (2.2)	59 (2.3)	58 (2.3)	49 (1.9)	50 (2.0)	679 (26.8)
Source: https://en.climate-data.org/asia/russian-federation/kursk-oblast/машкино-553486/

== Transport ==
Mashkino is located 57 km from the federal route M-3 Ukraine Highway, 38 km from the route M-2 Crimea Highway, 30 km from the route A-142 (Trosna – M3 highway), 13 km from the road of regional importance 38K-038 (Fatezh – Dmitriyev), 3 km from the road 38K-005 (Konyshyovka – Zhigayevo – 38K-038), on the roads of intermunicipal significance: 38Н-140 (38K-005 – Marmyzhi – Mashkino), 38Н-141 (38K-005 – Verkhoprudka), 38Н-466 (Mashkino – Bogdanovka), 38Н-467 (Mashkino – railway station Sokovninka near the settlement of the same name – Naumovka) and 38Н-468 (Mashkino – Forsov), 3.5 km from the nearest railway station Sokovninka (railway line Navlya – Lgov-Kiyevsky).

The rural locality is situated 70 km from Kursk Vostochny Airport, 168 km from Belgorod International Airport and 269 km from Voronezh Peter the Great Airport.
