= Staraya Belitsa, Kursk Oblast =

Rural locality in Kursk Oblast, Russia

Staraya Belitsa Старая Белица
- Selo
- Interactive map of Staraya Belitsa
- Location of Staraya Belitsa Staraya Belitsa (Kursk Oblast)
- Coordinates: 51°47′49″N 34°58′08″E
- Country: Russia
- Federal subject: Kursk Oblast
- Administrative district: Konyshyovsky District
- SelsovietSelsoviet: Starobelitsky

Population (2010 Census)
  - Total: 348
  - Estimate (2010): 348 (0%)

Administrative status
  - Capital of: Starobelitsky Selsoviet

Municipal status
  - Municipal district: Konyshyovsky Municipal District
  - Rural settlement: Starobelitsky Selsoviet Rural Settlement
  - Capital of: Starobelitsky Selsoviet Rural Settlement
- Time zone: UTC+3 (MSK)
- Postal code: 307602
- Dialing code: +7 47156
- OKTMO ID: 38616444101
- Website: старобелицкий.рф

Staraya Belitsa (Russian: Старая Белица) is a rural locality (Russian: село, lit. 'village') and the administrative center of Starobelitsky Selsoviet Rural Settlement, Konyshyovsky District, Kursk Oblast, Russia. Population: 348 (2010 census); 569 (2002 census);

== Geography ==
The village is located on the Belichka River (a left tributary of the Svapa River), 57 km from the Russia–Ukraine border, 74 km north-west of Kursk, 17.5 km north-west of the district center – the urban-type settlement Konyshyovka.

Climate

Staraya Belitsa has a warm-summer humid continental climate (Dfb in the Köppen climate classification).

Climate data for Staraya Belitsa
Month	Jan	Feb	Mar	Apr	May	Jun	Jul	Aug	Sep	Oct	Nov	Dec	Year
Mean daily maximum °C (°F)	−4 (25)	−3.1 (26.4)	2.8 (37.0)	12.9 (55.2)	19.2 (66.6)	22.5 (72.5)	25 (77)	24.3 (75.7)	18 (64)	10.4 (50.7)	3.4 (38.1)	−1.1 (30.0)	10.9 (51.5)
Daily mean °C (°F)	−6.1 (21.0)	−5.6 (21.9)	−0.8 (30.6)	8.1 (46.6)	14.6 (58.3)	18.2 (64.8)	20.7 (69.3)	19.7 (67.5)	13.9 (57.0)	7.2 (45.0)	1.2 (34.2)	−3 (27)	7.3 (45.3)
Mean daily minimum °C (°F)	−8.5 (16.7)	−8.6 (16.5)	−4.9 (23.2)	2.7 (36.9)	9 (48)	12.9 (55.2)	15.7 (60.3)	14.7 (58.5)	9.7 (49.5)	4 (39)	−1 (30)	−5.2 (22.6)	3.4 (38.0)
Average precipitation mm (inches)	51 (2.0)	45 (1.8)	47 (1.9)	51 (2.0)	63 (2.5)	70 (2.8)	80 (3.1)	56 (2.2)	59 (2.3)	58 (2.3)	49 (1.9)	50 (2.0)	679 (26.8)
Source: https://en.climate-data.org/asia/russian-federation/kursk-oblast/старая-белица-656320/

== Transport ==
Staraya Belitsa is located 46 km from the federal route M-3 Ukraine Highway, 44 km from the route M-2 Crimea Highway, 21 km from the route A-142 (Trosna – M3 highway), 7.5 km from the road of regional importance 38K-038 (Fatezh – Dmitriyev), 13.5 km from the road 38K-005 (Konyshyovka – Zhigayevo – 38K-038), 9 km from the road 38K-003 (Dmitriyev – Beryoza – Menshikovo – Khomutovka), on the roads of intermunicipal significance: 38Н-146 (38N-144 – Oleshenka with the access road to Naumovka), 38Н-147 (38N-146 – Staraya Belitsa – Bely Klyuch – Grinyovka) and 38Н-148 (38N-146 – Kusakovo-Belitsa), 0.3 km from the nearest railway halt 536 km (railway line Navlya – Lgov-Kiyevsky).

The rural locality is situated 79 km from Kursk Vostochny Airport, 177 km from Belgorod International Airport and 278 km from Voronezh Peter the Great Airport.
