= Oleshenka, Kursk Oblast =

Rural locality in Kursk Oblast, Russia

Oleshenka Олешенка
- Khutor
- Interactive map of Oleshenka
- Location of Oleshenka Oleshenka (Kursk Oblast)
- Coordinates: 52°00′28″N 35°10′41″E
- Country: Russia
- Federal subject: Kursk Oblast
- Administrative district: Konyshyovsky District
- SelsovietSelsoviet: Starobelitsky

Population (2010 Census)
  - Total: 52
  - Estimate (2010): 52 (0%)

Municipal status
  - Municipal district: Konyshyovsky Municipal District
  - Rural settlement: Starobelitsky Selsoviet Rural Settlement
- Time zone: UTC+3 (MSK)
- Postal code: 307602
- Dialing code: +7 47156
- OKTMO ID: 38616444131
- Website: старобелицкий.рф

Oleshenka (Russian: Олешенка) is a rural locality (a khutor) in Starobelitsky Selsoviet Rural Settlement, Konyshyovsky District, Kursk Oblast, Russia. Population: 52 (2010 census); 104 (2002 census);

== Geography ==
The khutor is located in the Belichka River basin (a left tributary of the Svapa River), 56 km from the Russia–Ukraine border, 75 km north-west of Kursk, 20 km north-west of the district center – the urban-type settlement Konyshyovka, 1.5 km from the selsoviet center – Staraya Belitsa.

Climate

Oleshenka has a warm-summer humid continental climate (Dfb in the Köppen climate classification).

== Transport ==
Oleshenka is located 48 km from the federal route M-3 Ukraine Highway, 44 km from the route M-2 Crimea Highway, 20 km from the route A-142 (Trosna – M3 highway), 5.5 km from the road of regional importance 38K-038 (Fatezh – Dmitriyev), 15 km from the road 38K-005 (Konyshyovka – Zhigayevo – 38K-038), 10 km from the road 38K-003 (Dmitriyev – Beryoza – Menshikovo – Khomutovka), on the road of intermunicipal significance 38Н-146 (38N-144 – Oleshenka, with the access road to Naumovka), 2.5 km from the nearest railway halt 536 km (railway line Navlya – Lgov-Kiyevsky).

The rural locality is situated 81 km from Kursk Vostochny Airport, 179 km from Belgorod International Airport and 280 km from Voronezh Peter the Great Airport.
