= Naumovka, Kursk Oblast =

Rural locality in Kursk Oblast, Russia

Naumovka Наумовка
- Selo
- Interactive map of Naumovka
- Location of Naumovka Naumovka (Kursk Oblast)
- Coordinates: 51°56′20″N 35°10′10″E
- Country: Russia
- Federal subject: Kursk Oblast
- Administrative district: Konyshyovsky District
- SelsovietSelsoviet: Naumovsky

Population (2010 Census)
  - Total: 116
  - Estimate (2010): 116 (0%)

Administrative status
  - Capital of: Naumovsky Selsoviet

Municipal status
  - Municipal district: Konyshyovsky Municipal District
  - Rural settlement: Naumovsky Selsoviet Rural Settlement
  - Capital of: Naumovsky Selsoviet Rural Settlement
- Time zone: UTC+3 (MSK)
- Postal code: 307614
- Dialing code: +7 47156
- OKTMO ID: 38616432101
- Website: naumovsky.ru

Naumovka (Russian: Наумовка) is a rural locality (Russian: село, lit. 'village') and the administrative center of Naumovsky Selsoviet Rural Settlement, Konyshyovsky District, Kursk Oblast, Russia. Population: 116 (2010 census); 208 (2002 census);

== Geography ==
The village is located on the Chmacha River (a left tributary of the Svapa River), 54 km from the Russia–Ukraine border, 74 km north-west of Kursk, 14 km north-west of the district center – the urban-type settlement Konyshyovka.

Climate

Naumovka has a warm-summer humid continental climate (Dfb in the Köppen climate classification).

Climate data for Naumovka
Month	Jan	Feb	Mar	Apr	May	Jun	Jul	Aug	Sep	Oct	Nov	Dec	Year
Mean daily maximum °C (°F)	−3.9 (25.0)	−3 (27)	2.9 (37.2)	13 (55)	19.2 (66.6)	22.5 (72.5)	25 (77)	24.3 (75.7)	18 (64)	10.5 (50.9)	3.4 (38.1)	−1.1 (30.0)	10.9 (51.6)
Daily mean °C (°F)	−6 (21)	−5.5 (22.1)	−0.7 (30.7)	8.2 (46.8)	14.6 (58.3)	18.2 (64.8)	20.8 (69.4)	19.8 (67.6)	13.9 (57.0)	7.3 (45.1)	1.3 (34.3)	−3 (27)	7.4 (45.3)
Mean daily minimum °C (°F)	−8.4 (16.9)	−8.5 (16.7)	−4.7 (23.5)	2.7 (36.9)	9 (48)	12.9 (55.2)	15.8 (60.4)	14.7 (58.5)	9.7 (49.5)	4 (39)	−1 (30)	−5.2 (22.6)	3.4 (38.1)
Average precipitation mm (inches)	51 (2.0)	45 (1.8)	47 (1.9)	51 (2.0)	63 (2.5)	70 (2.8)	80 (3.1)	56 (2.2)	59 (2.3)	58 (2.3)	49 (1.9)	50 (2.0)	679 (26.8)
Source: https://en.climate-data.org/asia/russian-federation/kursk-oblast/наумовка-508426/

== Transport ==
Naumovka is located 46 km from the federal route M-3 Ukraine Highway, 47 km from the route M-2 Crimea Highway, 26 km from the route A-142 (Trosna – M3 highway), 13.5 km from the road of regional importance 38K-038 (Fatezh – Dmitriyev), 11 km from the road 38K-005 (Konyshyovka – Zhigayevo – 38K-038), 13 km from the road 38K-003 (Dmitriyev – Beryoza – Menshikovo – Khomutovka), 3.5 km from the road of intermunicipal significance 38H-144 (Konyshyovka – Makaro-Petrovskoye, with the access road to the villages of Belyayevo and Chernicheno), on the roads 38Н-146 (38N-144 – Oleshenka with the access road to Naumovka) and 38Н-147 (38N-146 – Staraya Belitsa – Bely Klyuch – Grinyovka), 4 km from the nearest railway halt 543 km (railway line Navlya – Lgov-Kiyevsky).

The rural locality is situated 79 km from Kursk Vostochny Airport, 173 km from Belgorod International Airport and 280 km from Voronezh Peter the Great Airport.
