= Gustomoy =

Rural locality in Kursk Oblast, Russia

Gustomoy Густомой
- Selo
- Interactive map of Gustomoy
- Location of Gustomoy Gustomoy (Kursk Oblast)
- Coordinates: 51°38′06″N 35°03′00″E
- Country: Russia
- Federal subject: Kursk Oblast
- Administrative district: Lgovsky District
- SelsovietSelsoviet: Gustomoysky

Population (2010 Census)
  - Total: 527
  - Estimate (2010): 527 (0%)

Administrative status
  - Capital of: Gustomoysky Selsoviet

Municipal status
  - Municipal district: Lgovsky Municipal District
  - Rural settlement: Gustomoysky Selsoviet Rural Settlement
  - Capital of: Gustomoysky Selsoviet Rural Settlement
- Time zone: UTC+3 (MSK)
- Postal code: 307721
- Dialing code: +7 47140
- OKTMO ID: 38622424101
- Website: gustomoy.rkursk.ru

Gustomoy (Russian: Густомой) is a rural locality (Russian: село, lit. 'village') and the administrative center of Gustomoysky Selsoviet Rural Settlement, Lgovsky District, Kursk Oblast, Russia. Population: 527 (2010 census); 692 (2002 census);

== Geography ==
The village is located on the Gustomoy River in the basin of the Seym, 45 km from the Russia–Ukraine border, 78 km south-west of Kursk, 13 km west of the district center – the town Lgov.

Climate

Gustomoy has a warm-summer humid continental climate (Dfb in the Köppen climate classification).

Climate data for Gustomoy
Month	Jan	Feb	Mar	Apr	May	Jun	Jul	Aug	Sep	Oct	Nov	Dec	Year
Mean daily maximum °C (°F)	−3.6 (25.5)	−2.6 (27.3)	3.4 (38.1)	13.4 (56.1)	19.6 (67.3)	22.9 (73.2)	25.3 (77.5)	24.6 (76.3)	18.4 (65.1)	10.8 (51.4)	3.7 (38.7)	−0.8 (30.6)	11.3 (52.3)
Daily mean °C (°F)	−5.7 (21.7)	−5.2 (22.6)	−0.3 (31.5)	8.5 (47.3)	14.9 (58.8)	18.5 (65.3)	21 (70)	20 (68)	14.2 (57.6)	7.5 (45.5)	1.5 (34.7)	−2.8 (27.0)	7.7 (45.8)
Mean daily minimum °C (°F)	−8.2 (17.2)	−8.3 (17.1)	−4.4 (24.1)	3 (37)	9.2 (48.6)	13.1 (55.6)	15.9 (60.6)	14.9 (58.8)	9.9 (49.8)	4.1 (39.4)	−0.8 (30.6)	−5 (23)	3.6 (38.5)
Average precipitation mm (inches)	49 (1.9)	44 (1.7)	48 (1.9)	50 (2.0)	64 (2.5)	70 (2.8)	79 (3.1)	54 (2.1)	57 (2.2)	56 (2.2)	48 (1.9)	48 (1.9)	667 (26.2)
Source: https://en.climate-data.org/asia/russian-federation/kursk-oblast/gystomoi-321114/

== Transport ==
Gustomoy is located on the road of regional importance 38K-017 (Kursk – Lgov – Rylsk – border with Ukraine) as part of the European route E38, 0.5 km from the road of intermunicipal significance 38H-343 (38K-017 – Banishchi – Pristen), 1 km from the road 38H-372 (38K-017 – Stremoukhovka – Iznoskovo), 7 km from the nearest railway halt 387 km (railway line 322 km – Lgov I).

The rural locality is situated 86 km from Kursk Vostochny Airport, 152 km from Belgorod International Airport and 289 km from Voronezh Peter the Great Airport.
