= Makaro-Petrovskoye =

Rural locality in Kursk Oblast, Russia

Makaro-Petrovskoye Макаро-Петровское
- Selo
- Interactive map of Makaro-Petrovskoye
- Location of Makaro-Petrovskoye Makaro-Petrovskoye (Kursk Oblast)
- Coordinates: 51°57′28″N 35°03′54″E
- Country: Russia
- Federal subject: Kursk Oblast
- Administrative district: Konyshyovsky District
- SelsovietSelsoviet: Naumovsky

Population (2010 Census)
  - Total: 164
  - Estimate (2010): 164 (0%)

Municipal status
  - Municipal district: Konyshyovsky Municipal District
  - Rural settlement: Naumovsky Selsoviet Rural Settlement
- Time zone: UTC+3 (MSK)
- Postal code: 307601
- Dialing code: +7 47156
- OKTMO ID: 38616432106
- Website: naumovsky.ru

Makaro-Petrovskoye (Russian: Макаро-Петровское) is a rural locality (Russian: село, lit. 'village') in Naumovsky Selsoviet Rural Settlement, Konyshyovsky District, Kursk Oblast, Russia. Population: 164 (2010 census); 242 (2002 census);

== Geography ==
The village is located at the source of the Verbny Brook (a right tributary of the Chmacha River in the Svapa River basin), 47 km from the Russia–Ukraine border, 81 km north-west of Kursk, 19 km north-west of the district center – the urban-type settlement Konyshyovka, 6 km from the selsoviet center – Naumovka.

Climate

Makaro-Petrovskoye has a warm-summer humid continental climate (Dfb in the Köppen climate classification).

Climate data for Makaro-Petrovskoye
Month	Jan	Feb	Mar	Apr	May	Jun	Jul	Aug	Sep	Oct	Nov	Dec	Year
Mean daily maximum °C (°F)	−4 (25)	−3 (27)	2.8 (37.0)	13 (55)	19.3 (66.7)	22.6 (72.7)	25.1 (77.2)	24.3 (75.7)	18 (64)	10.5 (50.9)	3.4 (38.1)	−1.1 (30.0)	10.9 (51.6)
Daily mean °C (°F)	−6 (21)	−5.5 (22.1)	−0.8 (30.6)	8.2 (46.8)	14.6 (58.3)	18.3 (64.9)	20.8 (69.4)	19.8 (67.6)	13.9 (57.0)	7.2 (45.0)	1.2 (34.2)	−3 (27)	7.4 (45.3)
Mean daily minimum °C (°F)	−8.5 (16.7)	−8.6 (16.5)	−4.9 (23.2)	2.7 (36.9)	9 (48)	12.9 (55.2)	15.8 (60.4)	14.7 (58.5)	9.7 (49.5)	4 (39)	−1 (30)	−5.2 (22.6)	3.4 (38.0)
Average precipitation mm (inches)	50 (2.0)	44 (1.7)	47 (1.9)	51 (2.0)	63 (2.5)	70 (2.8)	81 (3.2)	56 (2.2)	58 (2.3)	57 (2.2)	49 (1.9)	49 (1.9)	675 (26.6)
Source: https://en.climate-data.org/asia/russian-federation/kursk-oblast/макаро-петровское-508425/

== Transport ==
Makaro-Petrovskoye is located, 40 km from the federal route M-3 Ukraine Highway, 53 km from the route M-2 Crimea Highway, 20 km from the route A-142 (Trosna – M3 highway), 13 km from the road of regional importance 38K-038 (Fatezh – Dmitriyev), 18 km from the road 38K-005 (Konyshyovka – Zhigayevo – 38K-038), 7 km from the road 38K-003 (Dmitriyev – Beryoza – Menshikovo – Khomutovka), on the road of intermunicipal significance 38H-144 (Konyshyovka – Makaro-Petrovskoye, with the access road to the villages of Belyayevo and Chernicheno), 6 km from the nearest railway halt 536 km (railway line Navlya – Lgov-Kiyevsky).

The rural locality is situated 86 km from Kursk Vostochny Airport, 179 km from Belgorod International Airport and 287 km from Voronezh Peter the Great Airport.
