= Belyayevo, Kursk Oblast =

Rural locality in Kursk Oblast, Russia

Belyayevo Беляево
- Selo
- Interactive map of Belyayevo
- Location of Belyayevo Belyayevo (Kursk Oblast)
- Coordinates: 51°52′16″N 35°06′32″E
- Country: Russia
- Federal subject: Kursk Oblast
- Administrative district: Konyshyovsky District
- SelsovietSelsoviet: Belyayevsky

Population (2010 Census)
  - Total: 306
  - Estimate (2010): 306 (0%)

Administrative status
  - Capital of: Belyayevsky Selsoviet

Municipal status
  - Municipal district: Konyshyovsky Municipal District
  - Rural settlement: Belyayevsky Selsoviet Rural Settlement
  - Capital of: Belyayevsky Selsoviet Rural Settlement
- Time zone: UTC+3 (MSK)
- Postal code: 307631
- Dialing code: +7 47156
- OKTMO ID: 38616404101
- Website: беляевский.рф

Belyayevo (Russian: Беляево) is a rural locality (Russian: село, lit. 'village') and the administrative center of Belyayevsky Selsoviet Rural Settlement, Konyshyovsky District, Kursk Oblast, Russia. Population: 306 (2010 census); 469 (2002 census);

== Geography ==
The village is located on the Rzhavets Brook (a left tributary of the Vandarets River in the Svapa River basin), 47 km from the Russia–Ukraine border, 76 km north-west of Kursk, 13 km north-west of the district center – the urban-type settlement Konyshyovka.

Climate

Belyayevo has a warm-summer humid continental climate (Dfb in the Köppen climate classification).

Climate data for Belyayevo
Month	Jan	Feb	Mar	Apr	May	Jun	Jul	Aug	Sep	Oct	Nov	Dec	Year
Mean daily maximum °C (°F)	−3.9 (25.0)	−2.9 (26.8)	3 (37)	13.1 (55.6)	19.4 (66.9)	22.7 (72.9)	25.1 (77.2)	24.4 (75.9)	18.1 (64.6)	10.6 (51.1)	3.5 (38.3)	−1 (30)	11.0 (51.8)
Daily mean °C (°F)	−5.9 (21.4)	−5.4 (22.3)	−0.6 (30.9)	8.3 (46.9)	14.7 (58.5)	18.3 (64.9)	20.8 (69.4)	19.8 (67.6)	14 (57)	7.3 (45.1)	1.3 (34.3)	−2.9 (26.8)	7.5 (45.4)
Mean daily minimum °C (°F)	−8.4 (16.9)	−8.6 (16.5)	−4.8 (23.4)	2.8 (37.0)	9.1 (48.4)	13 (55)	15.8 (60.4)	14.7 (58.5)	9.8 (49.6)	4 (39)	−1 (30)	−5.1 (22.8)	3.4 (38.1)
Average precipitation mm (inches)	49 (1.9)	44 (1.7)	48 (1.9)	50 (2.0)	64 (2.5)	70 (2.8)	79 (3.1)	54 (2.1)	57 (2.2)	56 (2.2)	48 (1.9)	48 (1.9)	667 (26.2)
Source: https://en.climate-data.org/asia/russian-federation/kursk-oblast/belyayevo-654116/

== Transport ==
Belyayevo is located 42.5 km from the federal route M-3 Ukraine Highway, 54 km from the route M-2 Crimea Highway, 29 km from the route A-142 (Trosna – M3 highway), 22 km from the road of regional importance 38K-038 (Fatezh – Dmitriyev), 13 km from the road 38K-005 (Konyshyovka – Zhigayevo – 38K-038), 13.5 km from the road 38K-003 (Dmitriyev – Beryoza – Menshikovo – Khomutovka), 10 km from the road 38K-023 (Lgov – Konyshyovka), on the road of intermunicipal significance 38H-144 (Konyshyovka – Makaro-Petrovskoye, with the access road to the villages of Belyayevo and Chernicheno), 13 km from the nearest railway station Konyshyovka (railway line Navlya – Lgov-Kiyevsky).

The rural locality is situated 82 km from Kursk Vostochny Airport, 169 km from Belgorod International Airport and 283 km from Voronezh Peter the Great Airport.
