= Chernicheno, Kursk Oblast =

Rural locality in Kursk Oblast, Russia

Chernicheno Черничено
- Selo
- Interactive map of Chernicheno
- Location of Chernicheno Chernicheno (Kursk Oblast)
- Coordinates: 51°51′43″N 35°10′54″E
- Country: Russia
- Federal subject: Kursk Oblast
- Administrative district: Konyshyovsky District
- SelsovietSelsoviet: Belyayevsky

Population (2010 Census)
  - Total: 184
  - Estimate (2010): 184 (0%)

Municipal status
  - Municipal district: Konyshyovsky Municipal District
  - Rural settlement: Belyayevsky Selsoviet Rural Settlement
- Time zone: UTC+3 (MSK)
- Postal code: 307630
- Dialing code: +7 47156
- OKTMO ID: 38616404136
- Website: беляевский.рф

Chernicheno (Russian: Черничено) is a rural locality (Russian: село, lit. 'village') in Belyayevsky Selsoviet Rural Settlement, Konyshyovsky District, Kursk Oblast, Russia. Population: 184 (2010 census); 273 (2002 census);

== Geography ==
The village is located on the Rzhavets Brook (a left tributary of the Vandarets River in the Svapa River basin), 52 km from the Russia–Ukraine border, 71 km north-west of Kursk, 8 km north-west of the district center – the urban-type settlement Konyshyovka, 4 km from the selsoviet center – Belyayevo.

Climate

Chernicheno has a warm-summer humid continental climate (Dfb in the Köppen climate classification).

Climate data for Chernicheno
Month	Jan	Feb	Mar	Apr	May	Jun	Jul	Aug	Sep	Oct	Nov	Dec	Year
Mean daily maximum °C (°F)	−3.9 (25.0)	−3 (27)	2.9 (37.2)	13 (55)	19.2 (66.6)	22.5 (72.5)	25 (77)	24.3 (75.7)	18 (64)	10.5 (50.9)	3.4 (38.1)	−1.1 (30.0)	10.9 (51.6)
Daily mean °C (°F)	−6 (21)	−5.5 (22.1)	−0.7 (30.7)	8.2 (46.8)	14.6 (58.3)	18.2 (64.8)	20.8 (69.4)	19.8 (67.6)	13.9 (57.0)	7.3 (45.1)	1.3 (34.3)	−3 (27)	7.4 (45.3)
Mean daily minimum °C (°F)	−8.4 (16.9)	−8.5 (16.7)	−4.7 (23.5)	2.7 (36.9)	9 (48)	12.9 (55.2)	15.8 (60.4)	14.7 (58.5)	9.7 (49.5)	4 (39)	−1 (30)	−5.2 (22.6)	3.4 (38.1)
Average precipitation mm (inches)	50 (2.0)	44 (1.7)	48 (1.9)	50 (2.0)	63 (2.5)	71 (2.8)	77 (3.0)	54 (2.1)	57 (2.2)	57 (2.2)	48 (1.9)	49 (1.9)	668 (26.2)
Source: https://en.climate-data.org/asia/russian-federation/kursk-oblast/chernicheno-654117/

== Transport ==
Chernicheno is located 47.5 km from the federal route M-3 Ukraine Highway, 50 km from the route M-2 Crimea Highway, 33 km from the route A-142 (Trosna – M3 highway), 22 km from the road of regional importance 38K-038 (Fatezh – Dmitriyev), 8.5 km from the road 38K-005 (Konyshyovka – Zhigayevo – 38K-038), 18 km from the road 38K-003 (Dmitriyev – Beryoza – Menshikovo – Khomutovka), 6 km from the road 38K-023 (Lgov – Konyshyovka), on the road of intermunicipal significance 38H-144 (Konyshyovka – Makaro-Petrovskoye, with the access road to the villages of Belyayevo and Chernicheno), 8 km from the nearest railway station Konyshyovka (railway line Navlya – Lgov-Kiyevsky).

The rural locality is situated 71 km from Kursk Vostochny Airport, 165 km from Belgorod International Airport and 279 km from Voronezh Peter the Great Airport.
