= Khomutovka, Kursk Oblast =

Khomutovka Хомутовка
- Urban-type settlement
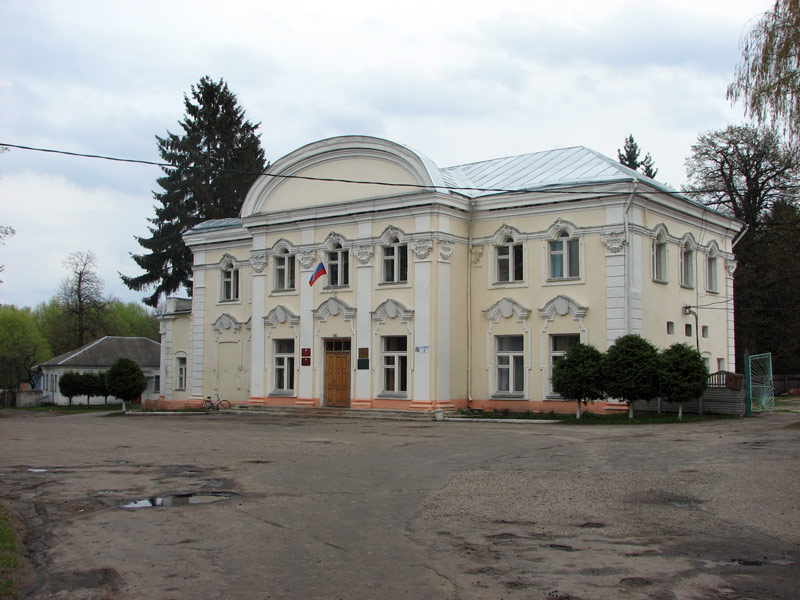
- Interactive map of Khomutovka
- Location of Khomutovka Khomutovka (Kursk Oblast)
- Coordinates: 51°55′6″N 34°33′35″E
- Country: Russia
- Federal subject: Kursk Oblast
- Administrative district: Khomutovsky District
- First mentioned: 1686
- Urban-type settlement status since: 1967
- Elevation: 196 m (643 ft)

Population (2010 Census)
  - Total: 4,230
  - Estimate (2025): 3,659 (−13.5%)

Administrative status
  - Capital of: Khomutovsky District

Municipal status
  - Capital of: Khomutovsky District
- Time zone: UTC+3 (MSK)
- Postal code: 307540
- Dialing code: +7 47137
- OKTMO ID: 38646151051

Khomutovka (Russian: Хомутовка) is an urban locality (an urban-type settlement) and the administrative center of Khomutovsky District of Kursk Oblast, Russia. Population: 4,230 (2010 census); 5,050 (2002 census); 5,578 (1989 Soviet census). Telephone code: +7 47137; postal code: 307540.

It was first mentioned in the 18th century and was granted urban-type settlement status in 1967.
