= Troitsky, Russia =

Troitsky (Russian: Тро́ицкий; masculine), Troitskaya (Тро́ицкая; feminine), or Troitskoye (Тро́ицкое; neuter) is the name of several rural localities in Russia.

== Modern localities ==
=== Altai Krai ===
As of 2010, three rural localities in Altai Krai bear this name:

- Troitsky, Altai Krai, a settlement in Zavetilyichevsky Selsoviet of Aleysky District
- Troitskoye, Troitsky District, Altai Krai, a selo in Troitsky Selsoviet of Troitsky District
- Troitskoye, Ust-Pristansky District, Altai Krai, a selo in Troitsky Selsoviet of Ust-Pristansky District

=== Amur Oblast ===
As of 2010, one rural locality in Amur Oblast bears this name:

- Troitskoye, Amur Oblast, a selo in Troitsky Rural Settlement of Ivanovsky District

=== Arkhangelsk Oblast ===
As of 2014, one rural locality in Arkhangelsk Oblast bears this name:

- Troitskaya, Arkhangelsk Oblast, a village in Puchuzhsky Selsoviet of Verkhnetoyemsky District

=== Astrakhan Oblast ===
As of 2010, one rural locality in Astrakhan Oblast bears this name:

- Troitsky, Astrakhan Oblast, a settlement in Sergiyevsky Selsoviet of Ikryaninsky District

=== Republic of Bashkortostan ===
As of 2010, three rural localities in the Republic of Bashkortostan bear this name:

- Troitsky, Republic of Bashkortostan, a selo in Troitsky Selsoviet of Blagovarsky District
- Troitskoye, Arkhangelsky District, Republic of Bashkortostan, a village in Krasnokurtovsky Selsoviet of Arkhangelsky District
- Troitskoye, Meleuzovsky District, Republic of Bashkortostan, a selo in Partizansky Selsoviet of Meleuzovsky District

=== Belgorod Oblast ===
As of 2010, one rural locality in Belgorod Oblast bears this name:

- Troitsky, Belgorod Oblast, a settlement in Gubkinsky District

=== Bryansk Oblast ===
As of 2010, two rural localities in Bryansk Oblast bear this name:

- Troitsky, Bryansk Oblast, a settlement in Lopandinsky Selsoviet of Komarichsky District
- Troitskoye, Bryansk Oblast, a selo in Voronovsky Selsoviet of Rognedinsky District

=== Republic of Buryatia ===
As of 2010, two rural localities in the Republic of Buryatia bear this name:

- Troitsky, Republic of Buryatia, a settlement in Bagdarinsky Selsoviet of Bauntovsky District
- Troitskoye, Republic of Buryatia, a selo in Talovsky Selsoviet of Pribaykalsky District

=== Chuvash Republic ===
As of 2010, one rural locality in the Chuvash Republic bears this name:

- Troitskoye, Chuvash Republic, a village in Maloyaushskoye Rural Settlement of Vurnarsky District

=== Republic of Ingushetia ===
As of 2010, one rural locality in the Republic of Ingushetia bears this name:

- Troitskaya, Republic of Ingushetia, a stanitsa in Sunzhensky District

=== Republic of Kalmykia ===
As of 2010, one rural locality in the Republic of Kalmykia bears this name:

- Troitskoye, Republic of Kalmykia, a selo in Troitskaya Rural Administration of Tselinny District

=== Kaluga Oblast ===
As of 2010, five rural localities in Kaluga Oblast bear this name:

- Troitskoye, Ferzikovsky District, Kaluga Oblast, a village in Ferzikovsky District
- Troitskoye, Kuybyshevsky District, Kaluga Oblast, a selo in Kuybyshevsky District
- Troitskoye (selo), Medynsky District, Kaluga Oblast, a selo in Medynsky District
- Troitskoye (village), Medynsky District, Kaluga Oblast, a village in Medynsky District
- Troitskoye, Zhukovsky District, Kaluga Oblast, a selo in Zhukovsky District

=== Kemerovo Oblast ===
As of 2010, one rural locality in Kemerovo Oblast bears this name:

- Troitskoye, Kemerovo Oblast, a selo in Troitskaya Rural Territory of Izhmorsky District

=== Khabarovsk Krai ===
As of 2010, one rural locality in Khabarovsk Krai bears this name:

- Troitskoye, Khabarovsk Krai, a selo in Nanaysky District

=== Republic of Khakassia ===
As of 2010, one rural locality in the Republic of Khakassia bears this name:

- Troitskoye, Republic of Khakassia, a selo in Troitsky Selsoviet of Bogradsky District

=== Kirov Oblast ===
As of 2010, two rural localities in Kirov Oblast bear this name:

- Troitsky, Kirov Oblast, a pochinok in Savalsky Rural Okrug of Malmyzhsky District
- Troitskoye, Kirov Oblast, a selo in Selinsky Rural Okrug of Kilmezsky District

=== Kostroma Oblast ===
As of 2010, three rural localities in Kostroma Oblast bear this name:

- Troitskoye, Antropovsky District, Kostroma Oblast, a village in Kotelnikovskoye Settlement of Antropovsky District
- Troitskoye, Sharyinsky District, Kostroma Oblast, a selo in Troitskoye Settlement of Sharyinsky District
- Troitskoye, Susaninsky District, Kostroma Oblast, a village in Severnoye Settlement of Susaninsky District

=== Krasnodar Krai ===
As of 2010, three rural localities in Krasnodar Krai bear this name:

- Troitsky, Otradnensky District, Krasnodar Krai, a khutor in Krasnogvardeysky Rural Okrug of Otradnensky District
- Troitsky, Slavyansky District, Krasnodar Krai, a khutor in Mayevsky Rural Okrug of Slavyansky District
- Troitskaya, Krasnodar Krai, a stanitsa in Troitsky Rural Okrug of Krymsky District

=== Krasnoyarsk Krai ===
As of 2014, one rural locality in Krasnoyarsk Krai bears this name:

- Troitskoye, Krasnoyarsk Krai, a village in Predivinsky Selsoviet of Bolshemurtinsky District

=== Kurgan Oblast ===
As of 2010, two rural localities in Kurgan Oblast bear this name:

- Troitskoye, Mishkinsky District, Kurgan Oblast, a village in Kupaysky Selsoviet of Mishkinsky District
- Troitskoye, Petukhovsky District, Kurgan Oblast, a selo in Troitsky Selsoviet of Petukhovsky District

=== Kursk Oblast ===
As of 2010, seven rural localities in Kursk Oblast bear this name:

- Troitsky, Kursk Oblast, a khutor in Naumovsky Selsoviet of Konyshyovsky District
- Troitskoye, Korenevsky District, Kursk Oblast, a selo in Gordeyevsky Selsoviet of Korenevsky District
- Troitskoye, Kurchatovsky District, Kursk Oblast, a village in Nikolayevsky Selsoviet of Kurchatovsky District
- Troitskoye, Bobryshevsky Selsoviet, Pristensky District, Kursk Oblast, a selo in Bobryshevsky Selsoviet of Pristensky District
- Troitskoye, Verkhneploskovsky Selsoviet, Pristensky District, Kursk Oblast, a selo in Verkhneploskovsky Selsoviet of Pristensky District
- Troitskoye, Sovetsky District, Kursk Oblast, a village in Verkhneragozetsky Selsoviet of Sovetsky District
- Troitskoye, Zheleznogorsky District, Kursk Oblast, a selo in Troitsky Selsoviet of Zheleznogorsky District

=== Lipetsk Oblast ===
As of 2010, four rural localities in Lipetsk Oblast bear this name:

- Troitskoye, Dolgorukovsky District, Lipetsk Oblast, a village in Svishensky Selsoviet of Dolgorukovsky District
- Troitskoye, Izmalkovsky District, Lipetsk Oblast, a selo in Chernavsky Selsoviet of Izmalkovsky District
- Troitskoye, Lev-Tolstovsky District, Lipetsk Oblast, a selo in Troitsky Selsoviet of Lev-Tolstovsky District
- Troitskoye, Lipetsky District, Lipetsk Oblast, a selo in Leninsky Selsoviet of Lipetsky District

=== Mari El Republic ===
As of 2010, one rural locality in the Mari El Republic bears this name:

- Troitsky, Mari El Republic, a vyselok in Ardinsky Rural Okrug of Kilemarsky District

=== Republic of Mordovia ===
As of 2010, one rural locality in the Republic of Mordovia bears this name:

- Troitsky, Republic of Mordovia, a settlement in Obrochinsky Selsoviet of Ichalkovsky District

=== Moscow Oblast ===
As of 2010, seven rural localities in Moscow Oblast bear this name:

- Troitsky, Moscow Oblast, a settlement in Ivanovskoye Rural Settlement of Istrinsky District
- Troitskoye, Chekhovsky District, Moscow Oblast, a selo in Lyubuchanskoye Rural Settlement of Chekhovsky District
- Troitskoye, Nudolskoye Rural Settlement, Klinsky District, Moscow Oblast, a village in Nudolskoye Rural Settlement of Klinsky District
- Troitskoye, Vysokovsk, Klinsky District, Moscow Oblast, a village under the administrative jurisdiction of the Town of Vysokovsk in Klinsky District
- Troitskoye, Mytishchinsky District, Moscow Oblast, a selo under the administrative jurisdiction of the Town of Mytishchi in Mytishchinsky District
- Troitskoye, Odintsovsky District, Moscow Oblast, a selo in Nikolskoye Rural Settlement of Odintsovsky District
- Troitskoye, Podolsky District, Moscow Oblast, a village in Shchapovskoye Rural Settlement of Podolsky District

=== Nizhny Novgorod Oblast ===
As of 2010, two rural localities in Nizhny Novgorod Oblast bear this name:

- Troitskoye, Knyagininsky District, Nizhny Novgorod Oblast, a selo in Ananyevsky Selsoviet of Knyagininsky District
- Troitskoye, Voskresensky District, Nizhny Novgorod Oblast, a selo in Staroustinsky Selsoviet of Voskresensky District

=== Republic of North Ossetia–Alania ===
As of 2010, one rural locality in the Republic of North Ossetia–Alania bears this name:

- Troitskoye, Republic of North Ossetia–Alania, a selo in Troitsky Rural Okrug of Mozdoksky District

=== Novosibirsk Oblast ===
As of 2010, four rural localities in Novosibirsk Oblast bear this name:

- Troitsky, Novosibirsk Oblast, a settlement in Kochkovsky District
- Troitskoye, Bagansky District, Novosibirsk Oblast, a selo in Bagansky District
- Troitskoye, Chistoozyorny District, Novosibirsk Oblast, a selo in Chistoozyorny District
- Troitskoye, Karasuksky District, Novosibirsk Oblast, a selo in Karasuksky District

=== Omsk Oblast ===
As of 2010, one rural locality in Omsk Oblast bears this name:

- Troitskoye, Omsk Oblast, a selo in Troitsky Rural Okrug of Omsky District

=== Orenburg Oblast ===
As of 2010, five rural localities in Orenburg Oblast bear this name:

- Troitsky, Orenburg Oblast, a settlement in Krasnokholmsky Selsoviet of the City of Orenburg
- Troitskoye, Asekeyevsky District, Orenburg Oblast, a selo in Troitsky Selsoviet of Asekeyevsky District
- Troitskoye, Buzuluksky District, Orenburg Oblast, a selo in Troitsky Selsoviet of Buzuluksky District
- Troitskoye, Sorochinsky District, Orenburg Oblast, a selo in Fedorovsky Selsoviet of Sorochinsky District
- Troitskoye, Tyulgansky District, Orenburg Oblast, a selo in Troitsky Selsoviet of Tyulgansky District

=== Oryol Oblast ===
As of 2010, eight rural localities in Oryol Oblast bear this name:

- Troitsky, Soskovsky District, Oryol Oblast, a settlement in Alpeyevsky Selsoviet of Soskovsky District
- Troitsky, Trosnyansky District, Oryol Oblast, a settlement in Pennovsky Selsoviet of Trosnyansky District
- Troitskoye, Livensky District, Oryol Oblast, a selo in Belomestnensky Selsoviet of Livensky District
- Troitskoye, Novosilsky District, Oryol Oblast, a selo in Glubkovsky Selsoviet of Novosilsky District
- Troitskoye, Orlovsky District, Oryol Oblast, a selo in Troitsky Selsoviet of Orlovsky District
- Troitskoye, Pokrovsky District, Oryol Oblast, a village in Stolbetsky Selsoviet of Pokrovsky District
- Troitskoye, Sverdlovsky District, Oryol Oblast, a selo in Koshelevsky Selsoviet of Sverdlovsky District
- Troitskoye, Verkhovsky District, Oryol Oblast, a selo in Telyazhensky Selsoviet of Verkhovsky District

=== Penza Oblast ===
As of 2010, two rural localities in Penza Oblast bear this name:

- Troitskoye, Bashmakovsky District, Penza Oblast, a selo in Troitsky Selsoviet of Bashmakovsky District
- Troitskoye, Pachelmsky District, Penza Oblast, a selo in Sheynsky Selsoviet of Pachelmsky District

=== Primorsky Krai ===
As of 2010, one rural locality in Primorsky Krai bears this name:

- Troitskoye, Primorsky Krai, a selo in Khankaysky District

=== Pskov Oblast ===
As of 2010, one rural locality in Pskov Oblast bears this name:

- Troitskoye, Pskov Oblast, a village in Pechorsky District

=== Rostov Oblast ===
As of 2010, three rural localities in Rostov Oblast bear this name:

- Troitsky, Morozovsky District, Rostov Oblast, a khutor in Shiroko-Atamanovskoye Rural Settlement of Morozovsky District
- Troitsky, Orlovsky District, Rostov Oblast, a khutor in Kamenno-Balkovskoye Rural Settlement of Orlovsky District
- Troitskoye, Rostov Oblast, a selo in Troitskoye Rural Settlement of Neklinovsky District

=== Ryazan Oblast ===
As of 2010, three rural localities in Ryazan Oblast bear this name:

- Troitskoye, Sarayevsky District, Ryazan Oblast, a selo in Troitsky Rural Okrug of Sarayevsky District
- Troitskoye, Shatsky District, Ryazan Oblast, a village in Fedosovsky Rural Okrug of Shatsky District
- Troitskoye, Zakharovsky District, Ryazan Oblast, a selo in Smenovsky Rural Okrug of Zakharovsky District

=== Sakhalin Oblast ===
As of 2010, one rural locality in Sakhalin Oblast bears this name:

- Troitskoye, Sakhalin Oblast, a selo in Anivsky District

=== Samara Oblast ===
As of 2010, three rural localities in Samara Oblast bear this name:

- Troitskoye, Bezenchuksky District, Samara Oblast, a selo in Bezenchuksky District
- Troitskoye, Syzransky District, Samara Oblast, a selo in Syzransky District
- Troitskaya, Samara Oblast, a village in Yelkhovsky District

=== Smolensk Oblast ===
As of 2010, four rural localities in Smolensk Oblast bear this name:

- Troitsky, Smolensk Oblast, a village in Gryazenyatskoye Rural Settlement of Roslavlsky District
- Troitskoye, Demidovsky District, Smolensk Oblast, a village in Zaboryevskoye Rural Settlement of Demidovsky District
- Troitskoye, Dukhovshchinsky District, Smolensk Oblast, a village in Tretyakovskoye Rural Settlement of Dukhovshchinsky District
- Troitskoye, Monastyrshchinsky District, Smolensk Oblast, a village in Barsukovskoye Rural Settlement of Monastyrshchinsky District

=== Stavropol Krai ===
As of 2010, one rural locality in Stavropol Krai bears this name:

- Troitsky, Stavropol Krai, a settlement in Kucherlinsky Selsoviet of Turkmensky District

=== Sverdlovsk Oblast ===
As of 2010, four rural localities in Sverdlovsk Oblast bear this name:

- Troitsky, Sverdlovsk Oblast, a settlement in Talitsky District
- Troitskoye, Bogdanovichsky District, Sverdlovsk Oblast, a selo in Bogdanovichsky District
- Troitskoye, Garinsky District, Sverdlovsk Oblast, a village in Garinsky District
- Troitskoye, Kamensky District, Sverdlovsk Oblast, a selo in Kamensky District

=== Tambov Oblast ===
As of 2010, four rural localities in Tambov Oblast bear this name:

- Troitsky, Petrovsky District, Tambov Oblast, a settlement in Petrovsky Selsoviet of Petrovsky District
- Troitsky, Tambovsky District, Tambov Oblast, a settlement in Avdeyevsky Selsoviet of Tambovsky District
- Troitskoye, Muchkapsky District, Tambov Oblast, a selo in Troitsky Selsoviet of Muchkapsky District
- Troitskoye, Umyotsky District, Tambov Oblast, a village in Sulaksky Selsoviet of Umyotsky District

=== Republic of Tatarstan ===
As of 2010, two rural localities in the Republic of Tatarstan bear this name:

- Troitsky, Laishevsky District, Republic of Tatarstan, a settlement in Laishevsky District
- Troitsky, Nizhnekamsky District, Republic of Tatarstan, a settlement in Nizhnekamsky District

=== Tula Oblast ===
As of 2010, five rural localities in Tula Oblast bear this name:

- Troitsky, Chernsky District, Tula Oblast, a settlement in Solovyevskaya Rural Administration of Chernsky District
- Troitsky, Kireyevsky District, Tula Oblast, a settlement in Dedilovsky Rural Okrug of Kireyevsky District
- Troitskoye, Arsenyevsky District, Tula Oblast, a selo in Belokolodezsky Rural Okrug of Arsenyevsky District
- Troitskoye, Uzlovsky District, Tula Oblast, a selo in Rakitinskaya Rural Administration of Uzlovsky District
- Troitskoye, Yasnogorsky District, Tula Oblast, a village in Burakovskaya Rural Territory of Yasnogorsky District

=== Tver Oblast ===
As of 2010, six rural localities in Tver Oblast bear this name:

- Troitskoye, Kalininsky District, Tver Oblast, a village in Kalininsky District
- Troitskoye, Kashinsky District, Tver Oblast, a village in Kashinsky District
- Troitskoye, Torzhoksky District, Tver Oblast, a village in Torzhoksky District
- Troitskoye, Zapadnodvinsky District, Tver Oblast, a village in Zapadnodvinsky District
- Troitskoye, Zharkovsky District, Tver Oblast, a village in Zharkovsky District
- Troitskoye, Zubtsovsky District, Tver Oblast, a village in Zubtsovsky District

=== Tyumen Oblast ===
As of 2010, one rural locality in Tyumen Oblast bears this name:

- Troitskoye, Tyumen Oblast, a selo in Antipinsky Rural Okrug of Nizhnetavdinsky District

=== Udmurt Republic ===
As of 2010, one rural locality in the Udmurt Republic bears this name:

- Troitskoye, Udmurt Republic, a village in Srednepostolsky Selsoviet of Zavyalovsky District

=== Ulyanovsk Oblast ===
As of 2010, one rural locality in Ulyanovsk Oblast bears this name:

- Troitskoye, Ulyanovsk Oblast, a selo under the administrative jurisdiction of the town of district significance of Inza in Inzensky District

=== Volgograd Oblast ===
As of 2010, two rural localities in Volgograd Oblast bear this name:

- Troitsky, Mikhaylovsky District, Volgograd Oblast, a khutor in Troitsky Selsoviet of Mikhaylovsky District
- Troitsky, Uryupinsky District, Volgograd Oblast, a khutor in Loshchinovsky Selsoviet of Uryupinsky District

=== Vologda Oblast ===
As of 2010, three rural localities in Vologda Oblast bear this name:

- Troitskoye, Cherepovetsky District, Vologda Oblast, a village in Ivanovsky Selsoviet of Cherepovetsky District
- Troitskoye, Gryazovetsky District, Vologda Oblast, a village in Yurovsky Selsoviet of Gryazovetsky District
- Troitskoye, Vashkinsky District, Vologda Oblast, a selo in Kisnemsky Selsoviet of Vashkinsky District

=== Voronezh Oblast ===
As of 2010, six rural localities in Voronezh Oblast bear this name:

- Troitsky, Buturlinovsky District, Voronezh Oblast, a settlement in Karaychevskoye Rural Settlement of Buturlinovsky District
- Troitsky, Talovsky District, Voronezh Oblast, a settlement in Alexandrovskoye Rural Settlement of Talovsky District
- Troitsky, Verkhnekhavsky District, Voronezh Oblast, a settlement in Spasskoye Rural Settlement of Verkhnekhavsky District
- Troitskoye, Liskinsky District, Voronezh Oblast, a selo in Troitskoye Rural Settlement of Liskinsky District
- Troitskoye, Novokhopyorsky District, Voronezh Oblast, a selo in Troitskoye Rural Settlement of Novokhopyorsky District
- Troitskoye, Semiluksky District, Voronezh Oblast, a selo in Novosilskoye Rural Settlement of Semiluksky District

=== Yaroslavl Oblast ===
As of 2010, six rural localities in Yaroslavl Oblast bear this name:

- Troitskoye, Borisoglebsky District, Yaroslavl Oblast, a village in Pokrovsky Rural Okrug of Borisoglebsky District
- Troitskoye, Nekrasovsky District, Yaroslavl Oblast, a selo in Burmakinsky Rural Okrug of Nekrasovsky District
- Troitskoye, Lychensky Rural Okrug, Pereslavsky District, Yaroslavl Oblast, a selo in Lychensky Rural Okrug of Pereslavsky District
- Troitskoye, Veskovsky Rural Okrug, Pereslavsky District, Yaroslavl Oblast, a village in Veskovsky Rural Okrug of Pereslavsky District
- Troitskoye, Uglichsky District, Yaroslavl Oblast, a selo in Ilyinsky Rural Okrug of Uglichsky District
- Troitskoye, Yaroslavsky District, Yaroslavl Oblast, a village in Tolbukhinsky Rural Okrug of Yaroslavsky District

== Abolished localities ==
- Troitsky, Arkhangelsk Oblast, a khutor in Solovetsky District of Arkhangelsk Oblast; abolished in December 2014

== Historical names ==
- Troitskoye, former name of Mamadysh, a town in Mamadyshsky District of the Republic of Tatarstan
