= Novotroitsky =

Set index of articles associated with the same name

Novotroitsky (Russian: Новотро́ицкий; masculine), Novotroitskaya (Новотро́ицкая; feminine), or Novotroitskoye (Новотро́ицкое; neuter) is the name of several rural localities in Russia.

== Amur Oblast ==
As of 2010, two rural localities in Amur Oblast bear this name:

- Novotroitskoye, Blagoveshchensky District, Amur Oblast, a selo in Novotroitsky Rural Settlement of Blagoveshchensky District
- Novotroitskoye, Konstantinovsky District, Amur Oblast, a selo in Novotroitsky Rural Settlement of Konstantinovsky District

== Republic of Bashkortostan ==
As of 2010, seven rural localities in the Republic of Bashkortostan bear this name:

- Novotroitskoye, Aurgazinsky District, Republic of Bashkortostan, a village in Tryapinsky Selsoviet of Aurgazinsky District
- Novotroitskoye, Bakalinsky District, Republic of Bashkortostan, a village in Starosharashlinsky Selsoviet of Bakalinsky District
- Novotroitskoye, Chishminsky District, Republic of Bashkortostan, a selo in Novotroitsky Selsoviet of Chishminsky District
- Novotroitskoye, Fyodorovsky District, Republic of Bashkortostan, a village in Dedovsky Selsoviet of Fyodorovsky District
- Novotroitskoye, Iglinsky District, Republic of Bashkortostan, a village in Tavtimanovsky Selsoviet of Iglinsky District
- Novotroitskoye, Mishkinsky District, Republic of Bashkortostan, a selo in Novotroitsky Selsoviet of Mishkinsky District
- Novotroitskaya, Republic of Bashkortostan, a village in Krivle-Ilyushkinsky Selsoviet of Kuyurgazinsky District

== Bryansk Oblast ==
As of 2010, two rural localities in Bryansk Oblast bear this name:

- Novotroitsky, Bryansk Oblast, a settlement in Aleshinsky Selsoviet of Navlinsky District
- Novotroitskoye, Bryansk Oblast, a village in Novotroitsky Selsoviet of Kletnyansky District

== Chelyabinsk Oblast ==
As of 2010, one rural locality in Chelyabinsk Oblast bears this name:

- Novotroitsky, Chelyabinsk Oblast, a settlement in Poletayevsky Selsoviet of Sosnovsky District

== Jewish Autonomous Oblast ==
As of 2010, one rural locality in the Jewish Autonomous Oblast bears this name:

- Novotroitskoye, Jewish Autonomous Oblast, a selo in Leninsky District

== Khabarovsk Krai ==
As of 2010, two rural localities in Khabarovsk Krai bear this name:

- Novotroitskoye, Khabarovsky District, Khabarovsk Krai, a selo in Khabarovsky District
- Novotroitskoye, Ulchsky District, Khabarovsk Krai, a selo in Ulchsky District

== Republic of Khakassia ==
As of 2010, one rural locality in the Republic of Khakassia bears this name:

- Novotroitskoye, Republic of Khakassia, a selo in Novotroitsky Selsoviet of Beysky District

== Kirov Oblast ==
As of 2010, one rural locality in Kirov Oblast bears this name:

- Novotroitskoye, Kirov Oblast, a selo in Novotroitsky Rural Okrug of Shabalinsky District

== Krasnodar Krai ==
As of 2010, two rural localities in Krasnodar Krai bear this name:

- Novotroitsky, Krymsky District, Krasnodar Krai, a khutor in Yuzhny Rural Okrug of Krymsky District
- Novotroitsky, Mostovsky District, Krasnodar Krai, a khutor in Yaroslavsky Rural Okrug of Mostovsky District

== Krasnoyarsk Krai ==
As of 2010, five rural localities in Krasnoyarsk Krai bear this name:

- Novotroitskoye, Idrinsky District, Krasnoyarsk Krai, a selo in Novotroitsky Selsoviet of Idrinsky District
- Novotroitskoye, Kazachinsky District, Krasnoyarsk Krai, a selo in Novotroitsky Selsoviet of Kazachinsky District
- Novotroitskoye, Minusinsky District, Krasnoyarsk Krai, a selo in Novotroitsky Selsoviet of Minusinsky District
- Novotroitskoye, Sukhobuzimsky District, Krasnoyarsk Krai, a selo in Shilinsky Selsoviet of Sukhobuzimsky District
- Novotroitskaya, Krasnoyarsk Krai, a village in Ikshurminsky Selsoviet of Pirovsky District

== Kurgan Oblast ==
As of 2010, two rural localities in Kurgan Oblast bear this name:

- Novotroitskoye, Chastoozersky District, Kurgan Oblast, a selo in Novotroitsky Selsoviet of Chastoozersky District
- Novotroitskoye, Mokrousovsky District, Kurgan Oblast, a village in Mikhaylovsky Selsoviet of Mokrousovsky District

== Kursk Oblast ==
As of 2010, one rural locality in Kursk Oblast bears this name:

- Novotroitskaya, Kursk Oblast, a village in Semenovsky Selsoviet of Kastorensky District

== Lipetsk Oblast ==
As of 2010, two rural localities in Lipetsk Oblast bear this name:

- Novotroitskoye, Dankovsky District, Lipetsk Oblast, a village in Berezovsky Selsoviet of Dankovsky District
- Novotroitskoye, Dolgorukovsky District, Lipetsk Oblast, a selo in Veselovsky Selsoviet of Dolgorukovsky District

== Mari El Republic ==
As of 2010, one rural locality in the Mari El Republic bears this name:

- Novotroitskoye, Mari El Republic, a village in Alexeyevsky Rural Okrug of Sovetsky District

== Republic of Mordovia ==
As of 2010, two rural localities in the Republic of Mordovia bear this name:

- Novotroitsky, Republic of Mordovia, a settlement in Krasnomaysky Selsoviet of Kochkurovsky District
- Novotroitskoye, Republic of Mordovia, a selo in Novotroitsky Selsoviet of Staroshaygovsky District

== Moscow Oblast ==
As of 2010, one rural locality in Moscow Oblast bears this name:

- Novotroitskoye, Moscow Oblast, a village in Fedinskoye Rural Settlement of Voskresensky District

== Nizhny Novgorod Oblast ==
As of 2010, one rural locality in Nizhny Novgorod Oblast bears this name:

- Novotroitskoye, Nizhny Novgorod Oblast, a village in Naruksovsky Selsoviet of Pochinkovsky District

== Omsk Oblast ==
As of 2010, one rural locality in Omsk Oblast bears this name:

- Novotroitskoye, Omsk Oblast, a selo in Novotroitsky Rural Okrug of Omsky District

== Orenburg Oblast ==
As of 2010, one rural locality in Orenburg Oblast bears this name:

- Novotroitskoye, Orenburg Oblast, a selo in Novotroitsky Selsoviet of Oktyabrsky District

== Oryol Oblast ==
As of 2010, four rural localities in Oryol Oblast bear this name:

- Novotroitsky, Kutafinsky Selsoviet, Kromskoy District, Oryol Oblast, a settlement in Kutafinsky Selsoviet of Kromskoy District
- Novotroitsky, Shakhovsky Selsoviet, Kromskoy District, Oryol Oblast, a settlement in Shakhovsky Selsoviet of Kromskoy District
- Novotroitskoye, Dolzhansky District, Oryol Oblast, a village in Kudinovsky Selsoviet of Dolzhansky District
- Novotroitskoye, Orlovsky District, Oryol Oblast, a village in Pakhomovsky Selsoviet of Orlovsky District

== Primorsky Krai ==
As of 2010, two rural localities in Primorsky Krai bear this name:

- Novotroitskoye, Anuchinsky District, Primorsky Krai, a selo in Anuchinsky District
- Novotroitskoye, Dalnerechensky District, Primorsky Krai, a selo in Dalnerechensky District

== Pskov Oblast ==
As of 2010, one rural locality in Pskov Oblast bears this name:

- Novotroitskoye, Pskov Oblast, a village in Kunyinsky District

== Rostov Oblast ==
As of 2010, two rural localities in Rostov Oblast bear this name:

- Novotroitsky, Rostov Oblast, a khutor in Boldyrevskoye Rural Settlement of Rodionovo-Nesvetaysky District
- Novotroitskoye, Rostov Oblast, a selo in Zadonskoye Rural Settlement of Azovsky District

== Sakhalin Oblast ==
As of 2010, one rural locality in Sakhalin Oblast bears this name:

- Novotroitskoye, Sakhalin Oblast, a selo in Anivsky District

== Stavropol Krai ==
As of 2010, one rural locality in Stavropol Krai bears this name:

- Novotroitskaya, Stavropol Krai, a stanitsa in Izobilnensky District

== Republic of Tatarstan ==
As of 2010, two rural localities in the Republic of Tatarstan bear this name:

- Novotroitskoye, Almetyevsky District, Republic of Tatarstan, a selo in Almetyevsky District
- Novotroitskoye, Tukayevsky District, Republic of Tatarstan, a selo in Tukayevsky District

== Tula Oblast ==
As of 2010, one rural locality in Tula Oblast bears this name:

- Novotroitskoye, Tula Oblast, a village in Andreyevskaya Volost of Kurkinsky District

== Tver Oblast ==
As of 2010, two rural localities in Tver Oblast bear this name:

- Novotroitskoye, Firovsky District, Tver Oblast, a village in Firovskoye Rural Settlement of Firovsky District
- Novotroitskoye, Staritsky District, Tver Oblast, a village in Staritsa Rural Settlement of Staritsky District

== Tyumen Oblast ==
As of 2010, two rural localities in Tyumen Oblast bear this name:

- Novotroitskoye, Tyumen Oblast, a selo in Novotroitsky Rural Okrug of Nizhnetavdinsky District
- Novotroitskaya, Tyumen Oblast, a village in Novoalexandrovsky Rural Okrug of Yarkovsky District

== Udmurt Republic ==
As of 2010, three rural localities in the Udmurt Republic bear this name:

- Novotroitsky, Alnashsky District, Udmurt Republic, a village in Tekhnikumovsky Selsoviet of Alnashsky District
- Novotroitsky, Vavozhsky District, Udmurt Republic, a village in Tylovyl-Pelginsky Selsoviet of Vavozhsky District
- Novotroitskoye, Udmurt Republic, a village in Vasilyevsky Selsoviet of Kiznersky District

== Ulyanovsk Oblast ==
As of 2010, one rural locality in Ulyanovsk Oblast bears this name:

- Novotroitskaya, Ulyanovsk Oblast, a settlement in Annenkovsky Rural Okrug of Maynsky District

== Voronezh Oblast ==
As of 2010, three rural localities in Voronezh Oblast bear this name:

- Novotroitsky, Voronezh Oblast, a settlement in Alexandrovskoye Rural Settlement of Talovsky District
- Novotroitskoye, Petropavlovsky District, Voronezh Oblast, a selo in Novotroitskoye Rural Settlement of Petropavlovsky District
- Novotroitskoye, Ternovsky District, Voronezh Oblast, a selo in Novotroitskoye Rural Settlement of Ternovsky District

== Yaroslavl Oblast ==
As of 2010, two rural localities in Yaroslavl Oblast bear this name:

- Novotroitskoye, Rostovsky District, Yaroslavl Oblast, a selo in Fatyanovsky Rural Okrug of Rostovsky District
- Novotroitskoye, Tutayevsky District, Yaroslavl Oblast, a village in Pomogalovsky Rural Okrug of Tutayevsky District

== See also ==
- Novotroitsk
- Troitsky (disambiguation)
- Troitsk
