= Troitsk =

Troitsk (Russian: Троицк, Tróick) is the name of several inhabited localities in Russia.

== Modern localities ==
Urban localities

- Troitsk, Chelyabinsk Oblast, a town in Chelyabinsk Oblast; 54°06′N 61°33′E
- Troitsk, Moscow, a town in Troitsk Settlement of Troitsky Administrative Okrug in the federal city of Moscow

Rural localities

- Troitsk, Kalmansky District, Altai Krai, a settlement in Kalmansky Selsoviet of Kalmansky District in Altai Krai; 52°53′N 83°34′E
- Troitsk, Kulundinsky District, Altai Krai, a selo in Oktyabrsky Selsoviet of Kulundinsky District in Altai Krai; 52°37′N 78°46′E
- Troitsk, Yeltsovsky District, Altai Krai, a settlement in Pushtulimsky Selsoviet of Yeltsovsky District in Altai Krai; 53°09′N 86°31′E
- Troitsk, Republic of Bashkortostan, a village in Yamakayevsky Selsoviet of Blagovarsky District in the Republic of Bashkortostan; 54°38′N 55°05′E
- Troitsk, Tayshetsky District, Irkutsk Oblast, a village in Tayshetsky District of Irkutsk Oblast; 55°55′N 97°33′E
- Troitsk, Zalarinsky District, Irkutsk Oblast, a selo in Zalarinsky District of Irkutsk Oblast; 53°28′N 02°10′E
- Troitsk, Komi Republic, a village in Bogorodsk Selo Administrative Territory of Kortkerossky District in the Komi Republic; 62°14′N 52°43′E
- Troitsk, Abansky District, Krasnoyarsk Krai, a village in Nikolsky Selsoviet of Abansky District in Krasnoyarsk Krai
- Troitsk, Bolsheuluysky District, Krasnoyarsk Krai, a village in Novonikolsky Selsoviet of Bolsheuluysky District in Krasnoyarsk Krai
- Troitsk, Ilansky District, Krasnoyarsk Krai, a village in Yuzhno-Alexandrovsky Selsoviet of Ilansky District in Krasnoyarsk Krai
- Troitsk, Taseyevsky District, Krasnoyarsk Krai, a selo in Troitsky Selsoviet of Taseyevsky District in Krasnoyarsk Krai
- Troitsk, Republic of Mordovia, a selo in Troitsky Selsoviet of Kovylkinsky District in the Republic of Mordovia; 54°05′N 43°49′E
- Troitsk, Novosibirsk Oblast, a village in Kochenyovsky District of Novosibirsk Oblast; 55°07′N 82°15′E
- Troitsk, Krutinsky District, Omsk Oblast, a village in Tolokontsevsky Rural Okrug of Krutinsky District in Omsk Oblast; 56°28′N 71°15′E
- Troitsk, Tyukalinsky District, Omsk Oblast, a selo in Troitsky Rural Okrug of Tyukalinsky District in Omsk Oblast; 55°42′N 72°15′E
- Troitsk, Orenburg Oblast, a selo in Troitsky Selsoviet of Sol-Iletsky District in Orenburg Oblast
- Troitsk, Chernushinsky District, Perm Krai, a village in Chernushinsky District of Perm Krai
- Troitsk, Kungursky District, Perm Krai, a selo in Kungursky District of Perm Krai
- Troitsk, Usolsky District, Perm Krai, a selo in Usolsky District of Perm Krai
- Troitsk, Olyokminsky District, Sakha Republic, a selo in Troitsky Rural Okrug of Olyokminsky District in the Sakha Republic
- Troitsk, Ust-Maysky District, Sakha Republic, a selo in Petropavlovsky Natsionalny Rural Okrug of Ust-Maysky District in the Sakha Republic

== Alternative names ==
- Troitsk, alternative name of Troinka, a selo in Dalny Selsoviet of Rubtsovsky District in Altai Krai; 51°30′N 81°37′E
- Troitsk, alternative name of Troitsky, a settlement in Bagdarinsky Selsoviet of Bauntovsky District in the Republic of Buryatia; 54°35′N 13°09′E
- Troitsk, alternative name of Troitskoye, a selo in Talovsky Selsoviet of Pribaykalsky District in the Republic of Buryatia; 52°07′N 07°10′E
- Troitsk, alternative name of Troitskoye, a village in Maloyaushskoye Rural Settlement of Vurnarsky District in the Chuvash Republic; 55°34′N 47°10′E
- Troitsk, alternative name of Troitskoye, a selo in Troitskaya Rural Territory of Izhmorsky District in Kemerovo Oblast; 56°04′N 86°53′E
- Troitsk, alternative name of Troitskoye, a selo in Troitsky Selsoviet of Petukhovsky District in Kurgan Oblast; 55°09′N 68°04′E
- Troitsk, alternative name of Troitskoye, a selo in Chistoozyorny District of Novosibirsk Oblast; 54°57′N 76°44′E
- Troitsk, alternative name of Troitsky, a settlement in Kochkovsky District of Novosibirsk Oblast; 54°01′N 79°56′E

== See also ==
- Troitsky (disambiguation)
