= Bragino =

Bragino may refer to the following rural localities in Russia:

- Bragino, Yeltsovsky District, Altai Krai
- Bragino, Vyaznikovsky District, Vladimir Oblast
- Bragino, Kirillovsky District, Vologda Oblast
- Bragino, Vologodsky District, Vologda Oblast
