= Cheremshanka =

Cheremshanka, (Russian: Черемшанка) may refer to:

- Cheremshanka, Altai Republic, a settlement in Mayminsky District, Altai Republic, Russia
- Cheremshanka, Altai Krai, a selo in Yeltsovsky District of the Altai Krai, Russia
