= Tyuy =

Tyuy Тюй
- Selo
- Location within Perm Krai Location within Russia
- Coordinates: 56°31′N 56°29′E
- Country: Russia
- Region: Perm Krai
- District: Chernushinsky District
- Time zone: UTC+5:00

Tyuy (Russian: Тюй) is a rural locality (a selo) and the administrative center of Tyuinskoye Rural Settlement, Chernushinsky District, Perm Krai, Russia. The population was 475 as of 2010. There are 5 streets.

== Geography ==
Tyuy is located 33 km east of Chernushka (the district's administrative centre) by road. Anastasino is the nearest rural locality.
