= Chernushinsky =

Chernushinsky (masculine), Chernushinskaya (feminine), or Chernushinskoye (neuter) may refer to:

- Chernushinsky District, a district of Perm Krai, Russia
- Chernushinskoye Urban Settlement, a municipal formation which the town of Chernushka and the settlement of Azinsky in Chernushinsky District of Perm Krai, Russia are incorporated as
