= Troitsky =

Troitsky (Троицкий, Tróickij, masculine), Troitskaya (Троицкая, Tróickaja, feminine), or Troitskoye (Троицкое, Tróickoje, neuter) is a Russian clerical surname derived from Troitsa (Тро́ица, Tróica) meaning Trinity. It may refer to:

== People ==
- Aleksei Troitsky (footballer) (1894–1958), Russian and Soviet soccer player
- Alexey Troitsky (1866–1942), Russian chess problemist
- Artemy Troitsky (born 1955), Russian music critic, whose name was originally Artem
- Pavel Ivanovich Troitskiy (ru) (1888-1965), Russian and French variety performer, couplet singer, vocalist, master of ceremonies (MC), stage actor, parody and spoken-word artist
- Sergey Viktorovich Troitskiy (1878–1972), Russian-born Serbian theologian; great-grandfather of Viktor
- Viktor Troicki (born 1986), Serbian tennis player; great-grandson of Sergey

== Places ==
- Troitsky Okrug (disambiguation), name of several divisions in Russia
- Troitsky District, name of several districts in Russia
- Troitsky, Russia (Troitskaya, Troitskoye), name of several rural localities in Russia
- Troitsky dugout, archaeological site in Veliky Novgorod
- Troitskoye, Kazakhstan, a village in the Almaty Province, Kazakhstan

== Other ==
- Troitskaya tower, one of the Kremlin towers

== See also ==
- Troitsk
- Troitske
- Troitsko-Pechorsk
- Novotroitsky
