= Bedryazh =

Bedryazh Бедряж
- Selo
- Location within Perm Krai Location within Russia
- Coordinates: 56°34′N 55°53′E
- Country: Russia
- Region: Perm Krai
- District: Chernushinsky District
- Time zone: UTC+5:00

Bedryazh (Russian: Бедряж) is a rural locality (a selo) and the administrative center of Bedryazhinskoye Rural Settlement, Chernushinsky District, Perm Krai, Russia. The population was 452 as of 2010. There are 3 streets.

== Geography ==
Bedryazh is located 17 km northwest of Chernushka (the district's administrative centre) by road. Andronovo is the nearest rural locality.
