= Taush =

Taush Тауш
- Selo
- Location within Perm Krai Location within Russia
- Coordinates: 56°25′N 56°04′E
- Country: Russia
- Region: Perm Krai
- District: Chernushinsky District
- Time zone: UTC+5:00

Taush (Russian: Тауш) is a rural locality (a selo) and the administrative center of Taushinskoye Rural Settlement, Chernushinsky District, Perm Krai, Russia. The population was 891 as of 2010. There are a total of 14 streets in the town.

== Geography ==
Taush is located 11 km south of Chernushka (the district's administrative centre) by road. Verkh-Yemash is the nearest rural locality.
