= Aminkay =

Aminkay Аминькай
- Village

- Location within Perm Krai Location within Russia
- Coordinates: 56°34′N 56°06′E
- Country: Russia
- Region: Perm Krai
- District: Chernushinsky District
- Time zone: UTC+5:00

Aminkay (Russian: Аминькай) is a rural locality (a village) in Chernushinsky District, Perm Krai, Russia. The population was 220 as of 2010. There are 3 streets.

== Geography ==
Aminkay is located 8 km north of Chernushka (the district's administrative centre) by road. Zverevo is the nearest rural locality.
