= Atnyashka =

Atnyashka Атняшка
- Village
- Location within Perm Krai Location within Russia
- Coordinates: 56°26′N 56°10′E
- Country: Russia
- Region: Perm Krai
- District: Chernushinsky District
- Time zone: UTC+5:00

Atnyashka (Russian: Атняшка) is a rural locality (a village) in Chernushinsky District, Perm Krai, Russia. The population was 344 as of 2010. There are 6 streets.

== Geography ==
Atnyashka is located 17 km southeast of Chernushka (the district's administrative centre) by road. Pavlovka is the nearest rural locality.
