= Sulmash =

Sulmash Сульмаш
- Selo
- Location within Perm Krai Location within Russia
- Coordinates: 56°33′N 56°04′E
- Country: Russia
- Region: Perm Krai
- District: Chernushinsky District
- Time zone: UTC+5:00

Sulmash (Russian: Сульмаш) is a rural locality (a selo) and the administrative center of Sulmashinskoye Rural Settlement, Chernushinsky District, Perm Krai, Russia. The population was 673 as of 2010. There are 28 streets.

== Geography ==
Sulmash is located 5 km north of Chernushka (the district's administrative centre) by road. Azinsky is the nearest rural locality.
