= Verkh-Nenya =

Verkh-Nenya Верх-Неня
- Selo
- Location within Altai Krai Location within Russia
- Coordinates: 53°04′N 86°25′E
- Country: Russia
- Region: Altai Krai
- District: Yeltsovsky District
- Time zone: UTC+7:00

Verkh-Nenya (Russian: Верх-Неня) is a rural locality (a selo) and the administrative center of Verkh-Neninsky Selsoviet, Yeltsovsky District, Altai Krai, Russia. The population was 226 as of 2013. There are 11 streets.

== Geography ==
Verkh-Nenya is located 38 km southeast of Yeltsovka (the district's administrative centre) by road. Makaryevka is the nearest rural locality.
