= Demenyovo =

Demenyovo Деменёво
- Selo
- Location within Perm Krai Location within Russia
- Coordinates: 56°43′N 56°11′E
- Country: Russia
- Region: Perm Krai
- District: Chernushinsky District
- Time zone: UTC+5:00

Demenyovo (Russian: Деменёво) is a rural locality (a selo) and the administrative center of Demenyovskoye Rural Settlement, Chernushinsky District, Perm Krai, Russia. The population was 769 as of 2010. There are 21 streets.

== Geography ==
Demenyovo is located 27 km north of Chernushka (the district's administrative centre) by road. Gari is the nearest rural locality.
