= Novokamenka =

Novokamenka Новокаменка
- Village
- Location within Altai Krai Location within Russia
- Coordinates: 53°21′N 86°18′E
- Country: Russia
- Region: Altai Krai
- District: Yeltsovsky District
- Time zone: UTC+7:00

Novokamenka (Russian: Новокаменка) is a rural locality (a selo) and the administrative center of Novokamensky Selsoviet of Yeltsovsky District, Altai Krai, Russia. The population was 379 as of 2016. There are 10 streets.

== Geography ==
Novokamenka is located on the bank of the Kaltyk River, 16 km north of Yeltsovka (the district's administrative centre) by road. Yeltsovka is the nearest rural locality.
