= Bogatovka =

Bogatovka Богатовка
- Village
- Location within Perm Krai Location within Russia
- Coordinates: 56°40′N 56°13′E
- Country: Russia
- Region: Perm Krai
- District: Chernushinsky District
- Time zone: UTC+5:00

Bogatovka (Russian: Богатовка) is a rural locality (a village) in Chernushinsky District, Perm Krai, Russia. The population was 2 as of 2010. There is 1 street.

== Geography ==
Bogatovka is located 35 km northeast of Chernushka (the district's administrative centre) by road. Korobeyniki is the nearest rural locality.
