= Zverevo, Perm Krai =

Zverevo Зверево
- Village
- Location within Perm Krai Location within Russia
- Coordinates: 56°32′N 56°08′E
- Country: Russia
- Region: Perm Krai
- District: Chernushinsky District
- Time zone: UTC+5:00

Zverevo (Russian: Зверево) is a rural locality (a village) in Chernushinsky District, Perm Krai, Russia. The population was 518 as of 2010. There are 18 streets.

== Geography ==
Zverevo is located 6 km northeast of Chernushka (the district's administrative centre) by road. Chernushka is the nearest rural locality.
