= Agarzya =

Agarzya Агарзя
- Village
- Location within Perm Krai Location within Russia
- Coordinates: 56°28′N 56°30′E
- Country: Russia
- Region: Perm Krai
- District: Chernushinsky District
- Time zone: UTC+5:00

Agarzya (Russian: Агарзя) is a rural locality (a village) in Chernushinsky District, Perm Krai, Russia. The population was 12 as of 2010. There is 1 street.

== Geography ==
Agarzya is located 38 km east of Chernushka (the district's administrative centre) by road. Agarzinsky is the nearest rural locality.
