= Kamennyye Klyuchi =

Kamennyye Klyuchi Каменные Ключи
- Village
- Location within Perm Krai Location within Russia
- Coordinates: 56°35′N 56°28′E
- Country: Russia
- Region: Perm Krai
- District: Chernushinsky District
- Time zone: UTC+5:00

Kamennyye Klyuchi (Russian: Каменные Ключи) is a rural locality (a village) in Chernushinsky District, Perm Krai, Russia. The population was 164 as of 2010. There are 2 streets.

== Geography ==
Kamennyye Klyuchi is located 16 km west of Chernushka (the district's administrative centre) by road. Rakino is the nearest rural locality.
