= Bolshoy Yug =

Bolshoy Yug Большой Юг
- Village
- Location within Perm Krai Location within Russia
- Coordinates: 56°23′N 55°56′E
- Country: Russia
- Region: Perm Krai
- District: Chernushinsky District
- Time zone: UTC+5:00

Bolshoy Yug (Russian: Большой Юг) is a rural locality (a village) in Chernushinsky District, Perm Krai, Russia. The population was 118 as of 2010. There is 1 street.

== Geography ==
Bolshoy Yug is located 27 km southwest of Chernushka (the district's administrative centre) by road. Verkh-Yemash is the nearest rural locality.
