= Kuznetsovo, Chernushinsky District, Perm Krai =

Kuznetsovo Кузнецово
- Village
- Location within Perm Krai Location within Russia
- Coordinates: 56°24′N 56°07′E
- Country: Russia
- Region: Perm Krai
- District: Chernushinsky District
- Time zone: UTC+5:00

Kuznetsovo (Russian: Кузнецово) is a rural locality (a village) in Chernushinsky District, Perm Krai, Russia. The population was 65 as of 2010. There is 1 street.

== Geography ==
Kuznetsovo is located 20 km south of Chernushka (the district's administrative centre) by road. Yetysh is the nearest rural locality.
