= Karamorka =

Karamorka Караморка
- Village
- Location within Perm Krai Location within Russia
- Coordinates: 56°36′N 56°10′E
- Country: Russia
- Region: Perm Krai
- District: Chernushinsky District
- Time zone: UTC+5:00

Karamorka (Russian: Караморка) is a rural locality (a village) in Chernushinsky District, Perm Krai, Russia. The population was 35 as of 2010. There is 1 street.

== Geography ==
Karamorka is located 15 km north of Chernushka (the district's administrative centre) by road. Ryabki is the nearest rural locality.
