= Temnoye =

Temnoye Темное
- Village
- Location within Perm Krai Location within Russia
- Coordinates: 56°27′N 56°24′E
- Country: Russia
- Region: Perm Krai
- District: Chernushinsky District
- Time zone: UTC+5:00

Temnoye (Russian: Темное) is a rural locality (a village) in Chernushinsky District, Perm Krai, Russia. The population was 83 as of 2010. There are 5 streets.

== Geography ==
Temnoye is located 26 km southeast of Chernushka (the district's administrative centre) by road. Agarzinsky is the nearest rural locality.
