= Vinokurovo =

Vinokurovo Винокурово
- Village
- Location within Perm Krai Location within Russia
- Coordinates: 56°35′N 56°16′E
- Country: Russia
- Region: Perm Krai
- District: Chernushinsky District
- Time zone: UTC+5:00

Vinokurovo (Russian: Винокурово) is a rural locality (a village) in Chernushinsky District, Perm Krai, Russia. The population was 2 as of 2010. There are 2 streets.

== Geography ==
Vinokurovo is located 17 km northeast of Chernushka (the district's administrative centre) by road. Ryabki is the nearest rural locality.
