= Yesaul (selo) =

Yesaul Есаул
- Selo
- Location within Perm Krai Location within Russia
- Coordinates: 56°21′N 56°17′E
- Country: Russia
- Region: Perm Krai
- District: Chernushinsky District
- Time zone: UTC+5:00

Yesaul (Russian: Есаул) is a rural locality (a selo) in Chernushinsky District, Perm Krai, Russia. The population was 317 as of 2010. There are 6 streets.

== Geography ==
Yesaul is located 32 km southeast of Chernushka (the district's administrative centre) by road. Bizyar is the nearest rural locality.
