= Yemash-Pavlovo =

Yemash-Pavlovo Емаш-Павлово
- Village
- Location within Perm Krai Location within Russia
- Coordinates: 56°19′N 56°05′E
- Country: Russia
- Region: Perm Krai
- District: Chernushinsky District
- Time zone: UTC+5:00

Yemash-Pavlovo (Russian: Емаш-Павлово) is a rural locality (a village) in Chernushinsky District, Perm Krai, Russia. The population was 307 as of 2010. There are 3 streets.

== Geography ==
Yemash-Pavlovo is located 24 km south of Chernushka (the district's administrative centre) by road. Trushniki is the nearest rural locality.
