= Ryabki =

Set index of articles associated with the same name

Ryabki (Russian: Рябки) is the name of several rural localities in Russia:

- Ryabki, Novgorod Oblast, a village in Yazhelbitskoye Settlement of Valdaysky District of Novgorod Oblast
- Ryabki, Perm Krai, a selo in Chernushinsky District of Perm Krai
