= Verkh-Yemash =

Verkh-Yemash Верх-Емаш
- Village
- Location within Perm Krai Location within Russia
- Coordinates: 56°24′N 56°00′E
- Country: Russia
- Region: Perm Krai
- District: Chernushinsky District
- Time zone: UTC+5:00

Verkh-Yemash (Russian: Верх-Емаш) is a rural locality (a village) in Chernushinsky District, Perm Krai, Russia. The population was 150 as of 2010. There are 3 streets.

== Geography ==
Verkh-Yemash is located 16 km south of Chernushka (the district's administrative centre) by road. Taush is the nearest rural locality.
