= Strezh =

Strezh Стреж
- Passing loop
- Location within Perm Krai Location within Russia
- Coordinates: 56°30′N 55°58′E
- Country: Russia
- Region: Perm Krai
- District: Chernushinsky District
- Time zone: UTC+5:00

Strezh (Russian: Стреж) is a rural locality (a passing loop) in Chernushinsky District, Perm Krai, Russia. The population was 14 as of 2010. There is 1 street.

== Geography ==
Strezh is located 9 km west of Chernushka (the district's administrative centre) by road. Brod is the nearest rural locality.
