= Trun (selo) =

Trun Трун
- Selo
- Location within Perm Krai Location within Russia
- Coordinates: 56°26′N 56°18′E
- Country: Russia
- Region: Perm Krai
- District: Chernushinsky District
- Time zone: UTC+5:00

Trun (Russian: Трун) is a rural locality (a selo) and the administrative center of Trunovskoye Rural Settlement, Chernushinsky District, Perm Krai, Russia. The population was 629 as of 2010. There are 11 streets.

== Geography ==
Trun is located 22 km southeast of Chernushka (the district's administrative centre) by road. Trun (settlement) is the nearest rural locality.
