= Yermiya =

Yermiya Ермия
- Selo
- Location within Perm Krai Location within Russia
- Coordinates: 56°41′N 55°57′E
- Country: Russia
- Region: Perm Krai
- District: Chernushinsky District
- Time zone: UTC+5:00

Yermiya (Russian: Ермия) is a rural locality (a selo) in Chernushinsky District, Perm Krai, Russia. The population was 393 as of 2010. There are 5 streets.

== Geography ==
Yermiya is located 26 km north of Chernushka (the district's administrative centre) by road. Kutana is the nearest rural locality.
