= Bolshoy Ulyk =

Bolshoy Ulyk Большой Улык
- Village
- Location within Perm Krai Location within Russia
- Coordinates: 56°30′N 56°13′E
- Country: Russia
- Region: Perm Krai
- District: Chernushinsky District
- Time zone: UTC+5:00

Bolshoy Ulyk (Russian: Большой Улык) is a rural locality (a village) in Chernushinsky District, Perm Krai, Russia. The population was 85 as of 2010. There are 2 streets.

== Geography ==
Bolshoy Ulyk is located 13 km east of Chernushka (the district's administrative centre) by road. Pavlovka is the nearest rural locality.
