= Leninsky, Perm Krai =

Leninsky Ленинский
- Settlement
- Location within Perm Krai Location within Russia
- Coordinates: 56°42′N 56°22′E
- Country: Russia
- Region: Perm Krai
- District: Chernushinsky District
- Time zone: UTC+5:00

Leninsky (Russian: Ленинский) is a rural locality (a settlement) in Chernushinsky District, Perm Krai, Russia. The population was 5 as of 2010. There is 1 street.

== Geography ==
Leninsky is located 42 km northeast of Chernushka (the district's administrative centre) by road. Kalinovka is the nearest rural locality.
