= Trushniki =

Trushniki Трушники
- Selo
- Location within Perm Krai Location within Russia
- Coordinates: 56°22′N 56°03′E
- Country: Russia
- Region: Perm Krai
- District: Chernushinsky District
- Time zone: UTC+5:00

Trushniki (Russian: Трушники) is a rural locality (a selo) and the administrative center of Trushnikovskoye Rural Settlement, Chernushinsky District, Perm Krai, Russia. The population was 605 as of 2010. There are 6 streets.

== Geography ==
Trushniki is located 18 km south of Chernushka (the district's administrative centre) by road. Nikolayevsky is the nearest rural locality.
