= Rakino =

Rakino Ракино
- Village
- Location within Perm Krai Location within Russia
- Coordinates: 56°31′N 55°58′E
- Country: Russia
- Region: Perm Krai
- District: Chernushinsky District
- Time zone: UTC+5:00

Rakino (Russian: Ракино) is a rural locality (a village) in Chernushinsky District, Perm Krai, Russia. The population was 338 as of 2010. There are 2 streets.

== Geography ==
Rakino is located 9 km northwest of Chernushka (the district's administrative centre) by road. Brod is the nearest rural locality.
