= Anastasino =

Anastasino Анастасино
- Village
- Location within Perm Krai Location within Russia
- Coordinates: 56°29′N 56°21′E
- Country: Russia
- Region: Perm Krai
- District: Chernushinsky District
- Time zone: UTC+5:00

Anastasino (Russian: Анастасино) is a rural locality (a village) in Chernushinsky District, Perm Krai, Russia. The population of this one-street village was 19 as of 2010.

== Geography ==
Anastasino is located 22 km southeast of Chernushka (the district's administrative centre) by road. Orekhovaya Gora is the nearest rural locality.
