= Verkhny Kozmyash =

Verkhny Kozmyash Верхний Козьмяш
- Village
- Location within Perm Krai Location within Russia
- Coordinates: 56°33′N 56°19′E
- Country: Russia
- Region: Perm Krai
- District: Chernushinsky District
- Time zone: UTC+5:00

Verkhny Kozmyash (Russian: Верхний Козьмяш) is a rural locality (a village) in Chernushinsky District, Perm Krai, Russia. The population was 62 as of 2010. There are 3 streets.

== Geography ==
Verkhny Kozmyash is located 20 km east of Chernushka (the district's administrative centre) by road. Nizhny Kozmyash is the nearest rural locality.
