= Ustinovo, Chernushinsky District, Perm Krai =

Ustinovo Устиново
- Village
- Location within Perm Krai Location within Russia
- Coordinates: 56°21′N 56°09′E
- Country: Russia
- Region: Perm Krai
- District: Chernushinsky District
- Time zone: UTC+5:00

Ustinovo (Russian: Устиново) is a rural locality (a village) in Chernushinsky District, Perm Krai, Russia. The population was 141 as of 2010. There are 4 streets.

== Geography ==
Ustinovo is located 29 km south of Chernushka (the district's administrative centre) by road. Nikolayevsky is the nearest rural locality.
