= Yetysh =

Yetysh Етыш
- Selo
- Location within Perm Krai Location within Russia
- Coordinates: 56°23′N 56°10′E
- Country: Russia
- Region: Perm Krai
- District: Chernushinsky District
- Time zone: UTC+5:00

Yetysh (Russian: Етыш) is a rural locality (a selo) and the administrative center of Yetyshinskoye Rural Settlement, Chernushinsky District, Perm Krai, Russia. The population was 396 as of 2010. There are 7 streets.

== Geography ==
Yetysh is located 23 km southeast of Chernushka (the district's administrative centre) by road. Kuznetsovo is the nearest rural locality.
