= Bikulka =

Bikulka Бикулка
- Village
- Location within Perm Krai Location within Russia
- Coordinates: 56°33′N 56°13′E
- Country: Russia
- Region: Perm Krai
- District: Chernushinsky District
- Time zone: UTC+5:00

Bikulka (Russian: Бикулка) is a rural locality (a village) in Chernushinsky District, Perm Krai, Russia. The population was 34 as of 2010. There is 1 street.

== Geography ==
Bikulka is located 14 km northeast of Chernushka (the district's administrative centre) by road. Ryabki is the nearest rural locality.
