= Verkh-Kiga =

Verkh-Kiga Верх-Кига
- Village
- Location within Perm Krai Location within Russia
- Coordinates: 56°27′N 55°54′E
- Country: Russia
- Region: Perm Krai
- District: Chernushinsky District
- Time zone: UTC+5:00

Verkh-Kiga (Russian: Верх-Кига) is a rural locality (a village) in Chernushinsky District, Perm Krai, Russia. The population was 31 as of 2010. There is 1 street.

== Geography ==
Verkh-Kiga is located 15 km southwest of Chernushka (the district's administrative centre) by road. Sludka is the nearest rural locality.
