= Poslednikovo =

Poslednikovo Последниково
- Selo
- Location within Altai Krai Location within Russia
- Coordinates: 53°11′N 86°34′E
- Country: Russia
- Region: Altai Krai
- District: Yeltsovsky District
- Time zone: UTC+7:00

Poslednikovo (Russian: Последниково) is a rural locality (a selo) in Pushtulimsky Selsoviet, Yeltsovsky District, Altai Krai, Russia. The population was 128 as of 2013. There are 3 streets.

== Geography ==
Poslednikovo is located 29 km southeast of Yeltsovka (the district's administrative centre) by road. Bakhta is the nearest rural locality.
