= Osinovaya Gora =

Osinovaya Gora Осиновая Гора
- Settlement
- Location within Perm Krai Location within Russia
- Coordinates: 56°29′N 55°52′E
- Country: Russia
- Region: Perm Krai
- District: Chernushinsky District
- Time zone: UTC+5:00

Osinovaya Gora (Russian: Осиновая Гора) is a rural locality (a settlement) in Chernushinsky District, Perm Krai, Russia. The population was 9 as of 2010. There is 1 street.

== Geography ==
Osinovaya Gora is located 7 km northeast of Chernushka (the district's administrative centre) by road.
