= Ananyino =

Ananyino Ананьино
- Selo
- Location within Perm Krai Location within Russia
- Coordinates: 56°36′N 56°04′E
- Country: Russia
- Region: Perm Krai
- District: Chernushinsky District
- Time zone: UTC+5:00

Ananyino (Russian: Ананьино) is a rural locality (a selo) and the administrative center of Ananyinskoye Rural Settlement, Chernushinsky District, Perm Krai, Russia. The population was 568 as of 2010. There are 12 streets.

== Geography ==
Ananyino is located 12 km north of Chernushka (the district's administrative centre) by road. Malanichi is the nearest rural locality.
