= Tanypskiye Klyuchi =

Tanypskiye Klyuchi Таныпские Ключи
- Village
- Location within Perm Krai Location within Russia
- Coordinates: 56°23′N 56°06′E
- Country: Russia
- Region: Perm Krai
- District: Chernushinsky District
- Time zone: UTC+5:00

Tanypskiye Klyuchi (Russian: Таныпские Ключи) is a rural locality (a village) in Chernushinsky District, Perm Krai, Russia. The population was 168 as of 2010. There are 4 streets.

== Geography ==
Tanypskiye Klyuchi is located 18 km south of Chernushka (the district's administrative centre) by road. Nikolayevsky is the nearest rural locality.
