= Kapkan, Perm Krai =

Kapkan Капкан
- Village
- Location within Perm Krai Location within Russia
- Coordinates: 56°39′N 56°08′E
- Country: Russia
- Region: Perm Krai
- District: Chernushinsky District
- Time zone: UTC+5:00

Kapkan (Russian: Капкан) is a rural locality (a village) in Chernushinsky District, Perm Krai, Russia. The population was 179 as of 2010. There are 3 streets.

== Geography ==
Kapkan is located 19 km north of Chernushka (the district's administrative centre) by road. Bogatovka is the nearest rural locality.
