= Nizhny Kozmyash =

Nizhny Kozmyash Нижний Козьмяш
- Selo
- Location within Perm Krai Location within Russia
- Coordinates: 56°32′N 56°19′E
- Country: Russia
- Region: Perm Krai
- District: Chernushinsky District
- Time zone: UTC+5:00

Nizhny Kozmyash (Russian: Нижний Козьмяш) is a rural locality (a selo) in Chernushinsky District, Perm Krai, Russia. The population was 192 as of 2010. There are 3 streets.

== Geography ==
Nizhny Kozmyash is located 19 km east of Chernushka (the district's administrative centre) by road. Verkhny Kozmyash is the nearest rural locality.
