= Bizyar, Chernushinsky District, Perm Krai =

Bizyar Бизяр
- Village
- Location within Perm Krai Location within Russia
- Coordinates: 56°22′N 56°20′E
- Country: Russia
- Region: Perm Krai
- District: Chernushinsky District
- Time zone: UTC+5:00

Bizyar (Russian: Бизяр) is a rural locality (a village) in Chernushinsky District, Perm Krai, Russia. The population was 34 as of 2010. There are 2 streets.

== Geography ==
Bizyar is located 30 km southeast of Chernushka (the district's administrative centre) by road. Yesaul is the nearest rural locality.
