= Bolshoye Kachino =

Bolshoye Kachino Большое Качино
- Village
- Location within Perm Krai Location within Russia
- Coordinates: 56°36′N 56°01′E
- Country: Russia
- Region: Perm Krai
- District: Chernushinsky District
- Time zone: UTC+5:00

Bolshoye Kachino (Russian: Большое Качино) is a rural locality (a village) in Chernushinsky District, Perm Krai, Russia. The population was 13 as of 2010. There is 1 street.

== Geography ==
Bolshoye Kachino is located 17 km north of Chernushka (the district's administrative centre) by road. Ananyino is the nearest rural locality.
