= Andronovo, Chernushinsky District, Perm Krai =

Village in Russia

Andronovo Андроново
- Village
- Location within Perm Krai Location within Russia
- Coordinates: 56°33′N 55°52′E
- Country: Russia
- Region: Perm Krai
- District: Chernushinsky District
- Time zone: UTC+5:00

Andronovo (Russian: Андроново) is a rural locality (a village) in Chernushinsky District, Perm Krai, Russia. The population was 119 as of 2010. There are 3 streets.

== Geography ==
Andronovo is located 19 km northwest of Chernushka (the district's administrative centre) by road. Bedryazh is the nearest rural locality.
