= Ashsha =

Ashsha Ашша
- Village
- Location within Perm Krai Location within Russia
- Coordinates: 56°30′N 56°07′E
- Country: Russia
- Region: Perm Krai
- District: Chernushinsky District
- Time zone: UTC+5:00

Ashsha (Russian: Ашша) is a rural locality (a village) in Chernushinsky District, Perm Krai, Russia. The population was 403 as of 2010. There are 3 streets.

== Geography ==
Ashsha is located 6 km east of Chernushka (the district's administrative centre) by road. Chernushka is the nearest rural locality.
