= Detkino =

Detkino Деткино
- Village
- Location within Perm Krai Location within Russia
- Coordinates: 56°34′N 56°20′E
- Country: Russia
- Region: Perm Krai
- District: Chernushinsky District
- Time zone: UTC+5:00

Detkino (Russian: Деткино) is a rural locality (a village) in Chernushinsky District, Perm Krai, Russia. The population was 42 as of 2010. There are 2 streets.

== Geography ==
Detkino is located 21 km northeast of Chernushka (the district's administrative centre) by road. Verkhny Kozmyash is the nearest rural locality.
