= Agarzinsky =

Agarzinsky Агарзинский
- Settlement
- Location within Perm Krai Location within Russia
- Coordinates: 56°27′N 56°30′E
- Country: Russia
- Region: Perm Krai
- District: Chernushinsky District
- Time zone: UTC+5:00

Agarzinsky (Russian: Агарзинский) is a rural locality (a settlement) in Chernushinsky District, Perm Krai, Russia. The population was 16 as of 2010. There are 5 streets.

== Geography ==
Agarzinsky is located 40 km east of Chernushka (the district's administrative centre) by road. Agarzya is the nearest rural locality.
