= Kedrovka, Altai Krai =

Kedrovka Кедровка
- Selo
- Location within Altai Krai Location within Russia
- Coordinates: 53°03′N 86°39′E
- Country: Russia
- Region: Altai Krai
- District: Yeltsovsky District
- Time zone: UTC+7:00

Kedrovka (Russian: Кедровка) is a rural locality (a selo) in Verkh-Neninsky Selsoviet, Yeltsovsky District, Altai Krai, Russia. The population was 26 as of 2013. There is 1 street.

== Geography ==
Kedrovka is located 54 km southeast of Yeltsovka (the district's administrative centre) by road. Makaryevka is the nearest rural locality.
