= Teklovka =

Teklovka Текловка
- Village
- Location within Perm Krai Location within Russia
- Coordinates: 56°23′N 55°27′E
- Country: Russia
- Region: Perm Krai
- District: Chernushinsky District
- Time zone: UTC+5:00

Teklovka (Russian: Текловка) is a rural locality (a village) in Chernushinsky District, Perm Krai, Russia. The population was 68 as of 2010. There are 3 streets.

== Geography ==
Teklovka is located 33 km southeast of Chernushka (the district's administrative centre) by road. Ivanovka is the nearest rural locality.
