= Bragino, Yeltsovsky District, Altai Krai =

Bragino Брагино
- Selo
- Location within Altai Krai Location within Russia
- Coordinates: 53°12′N 85°58′E
- Country: Russia
- Region: Altai Krai
- District: Yeltsovsky District
- Time zone: UTC+7:00

Bragino (Russian: Брагино) is a rural locality (a selo) in Martynovsky Selsoviet, Yeltsovsky District, Altai Krai, Russia. The population was 86 as of 2013. There is 1 street.

== Geography ==
Bragino is located 36 km southwest of Yeltsovka (the district's administrative centre) by road. Martynovo is the nearest rural locality.
