= Orekhovaya Gora =

Orekhovaya Gora Ореховая Гора
- Selo
- Location within Perm Krai Location within Russia
- Coordinates: 56°28′N 56°19′E
- Country: Russia
- Region: Perm Krai
- District: Chernushinsky District
- Time zone: UTC+5:00

Orekhovaya Gora (Russian: Ореховая Гора) is a rural locality (a selo) in Chernushinsky District, Perm Krai, Russia. The population was 404 as of 2010. There are 8 streets.

== Geography ==
Orekhovaya Gora is located 20 km southeast of Chernushka (the district's administrative centre) by road. Trun is the nearest rural locality.
