= Troitsky District =

Administrative and municipal district name

Location of Altai Krai in Russia

Location of Chelyabinsk Oblast in Russia

Troitsky District is the name of several administrative and municipal districts in Russia:

- Troitsky District, Altai Krai, an administrative and municipal district of Altai Krai
- Troitsky District, Chelyabinsk Oblast, an administrative and municipal district of Chelyabinsk Oblast

== See also ==
- Troitsky (disambiguation)
- Troitsky Okrug (disambiguation)
