= Cheremshanka, Altai Krai =

Cheremshanka Черемшанка
- Village
- Location within Altai Krai Location within Russia
- Coordinates: 53°11′N 86°08′E
- Country: Russia
- Region: Altai Krai
- District: Yeltsovsky District
- Time zone: UTC+7:00

Cheremshanka (Russian: Черемшанка) is a rural locality (a selo) and the administrative center of Cheremshansky Selsoviet of Yeltsovsky District, Altai Krai, Russia. The population was 305 as of 2016. There are 5 streets.

== Geography ==
Cheremshanka is located on the right bank of the Chumysh River, 16 km southwest of Yeltsovka (the district's administrative centre) by road. Yeltsovka is the nearest rural locality.

== Ethnicity ==
The village is inhabited by Russians and others.
