= Troitsk, Chernushinsky District, Perm Krai =

Troitsk Троицк
- Village
- Location within Perm Krai Location within Russia
- Coordinates: 56°27′N 56°17′E
- Country: Russia
- Region: Perm Krai
- District: Chernushinsky District
- Time zone: UTC+5:00

Troitsk (Russian: Троицк) is a rural locality (a village) in Chernushinsky District, Perm Krai, Russia. The population was 8 as of 2010. There is 1 street.

== Geography ==
Troitsk is located 18 km southeast of Chernushka (the district's administrative centre) by road. Trun is the nearest rural locality.
