= Troitsk, Yeltsovsky District, Altai Krai =

Troitsk Троицк
- Settlement
- Location within Altai Krai Location within Russia
- Coordinates: 53°09′N 86°30′E
- Country: Russia
- Region: Altai Krai
- District: Yeltsovsky District
- Time zone: UTC+7:00

Troitsk (Russian: Троицк) is a rural locality (a settlement) in Pushtulimsky Selsoviet, Yeltsovsky District, Altai Krai, Russia. The population was 22 as of 2013. There are 4 streets.

== Geography ==
Troitsk is located 26 km southeast of Yeltsovka (the district's administrative centre) by road. Bakhta and Chistaya Griva are the nearest rural localities.
