= Novotroitskoye, Mishkinsky District, Republic of Bashkortostan =

Selo in Mishkinsky District, Bashkortostan, Russia

Novotroitskoye Новотроицкое
- Selo
- Location within Bashkortostan Location within Russia
- Coordinates: 55°44′N 56°12′E
- Country: Russia
- Region: Bashkortostan
- District: Mishkinsky District
- Time zone: UTC+5:00

Novotroitskoye (Russian: Новотроицкое) is a rural locality (a village) and the administrative centre of Novotroitsky Selsoviet, Mishkinsky District, Bashkortostan, Russia. The population was 450 as of 2010. There are 8 streets.

== Geography ==
Novotroitskoye is located 33 km northeast of Mishkino (the district's administrative centre) by road. Refandy is the nearest rural locality.
