= Ryabki, Perm Krai =

Ryabki Рябки
- Selo
- Location within Perm Krai Location within Russia
- Coordinates: 56°34′N 56°13′E
- Country: Russia
- Region: Perm Krai
- District: Chernushinsky District
- Time zone: UTC+5:00

Ryabki (Russian: Рябки) is a rural locality (a selo) and the administrative center of Ryabkovskoye Rural Settlement, Chernushinsky District, Perm Krai, Russia. The population was 1,302 as of 2010. There are 21 streets.

== Geography ==
Ryabki is located 13 km northeast of Chernushka (the district's administrative centre) by road. Bikulka is the nearest rural locality.
