= Biryubash =

Village in Mishkinsky District, Bashkortostan, Russia

Biryubash Бирюбаш
- Village
- Location within Bashkortostan Location within Russia
- Coordinates: 55°41′N 56°12′E
- Country: Russia
- Region: Bashkortostan
- District: Mishkinsky District
- Time zone: UTC+5:00

Biryubash (Russian: Бирюбаш; Bashkir: Бөрөбаш, Böröbaş; Meadow Mari: Пӱрӧмучаш, Pürömučaš) is a rural locality (a village) in Novotroitsky Selsoviet, Mishkinsky District, Bashkortostan, Russia. The population was 378 as of 2010. There are 3 streets.

== Geography ==
Biryubash is located 27 km northeast of Mishkino (the district's administrative centre) by road. Refandy is the nearest rural locality.
