= Azinsky =

Azinsky Азинский
- Settlement
- Location within Perm Krai Location within Russia
- Coordinates: 56°31′N 56°03′E
- Country: Russia
- Region: Perm Krai
- District: Chernushinsky District
- Time zone: UTC+5:00

Azinsky (Russian: Азинский) is a rural locality (a settlement) in Chernushinsky District, Perm Krai, Russia. The population was 1,492 as of 2010. There are 35 streets.

== Geography ==
Azinsky is located 2 km northwest of Chernushka (the district's administrative centre) by road. Chernushka is the nearest rural locality.
