= Troitskoye, Liskinsky District, Voronezh Oblast =

Troitskoye Троицкое
- Selo
- Location within Voronezh Oblast Location within Russia
- Coordinates: 51°04′N 39°13′E
- Country: Russia
- Region: Voronezh Oblast
- District: Liskinsky District
- Time zone: UTC+3:00

Troitskoye (Russian: Троицкое) is a rural locality (a selo) and the administrative center of Troitskoye Rural Settlement, Liskinsky District, Voronezh Oblast, Russia. The population was 1,203 as of 2010. There are 11 streets.

== Geography ==
Troitskoye is located 36 km northwest of Liski (the district's administrative centre) by road. Bodeyevka is the nearest rural locality.
