= Troitsky, Republic of Bashkortostan =

Troitsky Троицкий
- Selo
- Location within Bashkortostan Location within Russia
- Coordinates: 54°47′N 54°46′E
- Country: Russia
- Region: Bashkortostan
- District: Blagovarsky District
- Time zone: UTC+5:00

Troitsky (Russian: Троицкий) is a rural locality (a selo) and the administrative centre of Troitsky Selsoviet, Blagovarsky District, Bashkortostan, Russia. The population was 408 as of 2010. There are 3 streets.

== Geography ==
Troitsky is located 28 km northwest of Yazykovo (the district's administrative centre) by road. Novokonstantinovka is the nearest rural locality.
