= Novotroitskoye, Fyodorovsky District, Republic of Bashkortostan =

Novotroitskoye Новотроицкое
- Village
- Location within Bashkortostan Location within Russia
- Coordinates: 53°06′N 55°05′E
- Country: Russia
- Region: Bashkortostan
- District: Fyodorovsky District
- Time zone: UTC+5:00

Novotroitskoye (Russian: Новотроицкое) is a rural locality (a village) in Dedovsky Selsoviet, Fyodorovsky District, Bashkortostan, Russia. The population was 37 as of 2010. There is 1 street.

== Geography ==
Novotroitskoye is located 21 km southwest of Fyodorovka (the district's administrative centre) by road. Ilyinovka is the nearest rural locality.
