= Bragino, Vologodsky District, Vologda Oblast =

Bragino Брагино
- Village
- Location within Vologda Oblast Location within Russia
- Coordinates: 59°10′N 39°18′E
- Country: Russia
- Region: Vologda Oblast
- District: Vologodsky District
- Time zone: UTC+3:00

Bragino (Russian: Брагино) is a rural locality (a village) in Staroselskoye Rural Settlement, Vologodsky District, Vologda Oblast, Russia. The population was 50 as of 2002.

== Geography ==
Bragino is located 39 km southwest of Vologda (the district's administrative centre) by road. Khrenovo is the nearest rural locality.
