= Troitsk, Kalmansky District, Altai Krai =

Troitsk Троицк
- Settlement
- Location within Altai Krai Location within Russia
- Coordinates: 52°53′N 83°33′E
- Country: Russia
- Region: Altai Krai
- District: Kalmansky District
- Time zone: UTC+7:00

Troitsk (Russian: Троицк) is a rural locality (a settlement) in Kalmansky Selsoviet, Kalmansky District, Altai Krai, Russia. The population was 605 as of 2013. There are 7 streets.

== Geography ==
Troitsk is located on the right bank of the Kalmanka River, 4 km southeast of Kalmanka (the district's administrative centre) by road. Kalmanka is the nearest rural locality.
