= Troitskoye, Gryazovetsky District, Vologda Oblast =

Troitskoye Троицкое
- Village
- Location within Vologda Oblast Location within Russia
- Coordinates: 59°00′N 40°01′E
- Country: Russia
- Region: Vologda Oblast
- District: Gryazovetsky District
- Time zone: UTC+3:00

Troitskoye (Russian: Троицкое) is a rural locality (a village) in Yurovskoye Rural Settlement, Gryazovetsky District, Vologda Oblast, Russia. The population was 21 as of 2002. There are five streets.

== Geography ==
Troitskoye is located 27 km northwest of Gryazovets (the district's administrative centre) by road. Pochinok is the nearest rural locality.
