= Troitsky, Kursk Oblast =

Rural locality in Kursk Oblast, Russia

Troitsky Троицкий
- Khutor
- Interactive map of Troitsky
- Location of Troitsky Troitsky (Kursk Oblast)
- Coordinates: 51°55′18″N 35°03′32″E
- Country: Russia
- Federal subject: Kursk Oblast
- Administrative district: Konyshyovsky District
- SelsovietSelsoviet: Naumovsky

Population (2010 Census)
  - Total: 12
  - Estimate (2010): 12 (0%)

Municipal status
  - Municipal district: Konyshyovsky Municipal District
  - Rural settlement: Naumovsky Selsoviet Rural Settlement
- Time zone: UTC+3 (MSK)
- Postal code: 307614
- Dialing code: +7 47156
- OKTMO ID: 38616432156
- Website: naumovsky.ru

Troitsky (Russian: Троицкий) is a rural locality (a khutor) in Naumovsky Selsoviet Rural Settlement, Konyshyovsky District, Kursk Oblast, Russia. Population: 12 (2010 census); 13 (2002 census);

== Geography ==
The khutor is located on the Chmacha River (a left tributary of the Svapa River), 46 km from the Russia–Ukraine border, 80 km north-west of Kursk, 18 km north-west of the district center – the urban-type settlement Konyshyovka, 7.5 km from the selsoviet center – Naumovka.

Climate

Troitsky has a warm-summer humid continental climate (Dfb in the Köppen climate classification).

== Transport ==
Troitsky is located 39 km from the federal route M-3 Ukraine Highway, 55 km from the route M-2 Crimea Highway, 22.5 km from the route A-142 (Trosna – M3 highway), 17 km from the road of regional importance 38K-038 (Fatezh – Dmitriyev), 18 km from the road 38K-005 (Konyshyovka – Zhigayevo – 38K-038), 7 km from the road 38K-003 (Dmitriyev – Beryoza – Menshikovo – Khomutovka), 3 km from the road of intermunicipal significance 38H-144 (Konyshyovka – Makaro-Petrovskoye, with the access road to the villages of Belyayevo and Chernicheno), on the road 38Н-151 (38N-144 – Troitsky), 10 km from the nearest railway halt 536 km (railway line Navlya – Lgov-Kiyevsky).

The rural locality is situated 86 km from Kursk Vostochny Airport, 175 km from Belgorod International Airport and 287 km from Voronezh Peter the Great Airport.
