= Troitsky, Altai Krai =

Troitsky Троицкий
- Settlement
- Location within Altai Krai Location within Russia
- Coordinates: 52°35′N 82°41′E
- Country: Russia
- Region: Altai Krai
- District: Aleysky District
- Time zone: UTC+7:00

Troitsky (Russian: Троицкий) is a rural locality (a settlement) in Zavetilyichyovsky Selsoviet, Aleysky District, Altai Krai, Russia. The population was 42 as of 2013. There are 3 streets.

== Geography ==
Troitsky is located on the Karymka River, 19 km northwest of Aleysk (the district's administrative centre) by road. Zavety Ilyicha is the nearest rural locality.
