= Troitsky, Astrakhan Oblast =

Troitsky Троицкий
- Settlement
- Location within Astrakhan Oblast Location within Russia
- Coordinates: 45°58′N 47°38′E
- Country: Russia
- Region: Astrakhan Oblast
- District: Ikryaninsky District
- Time zone: UTC+4:00

Troitsky (Russian: Троицкий) is a rural locality (a settlement) in Ikryaninsky District, Astrakhan Oblast, Russia. The population was 365 as of 2010. There are 2 streets.

== Geography ==
It is located 11 km SSW from Ikryanoye.
