= Troitsky, Talovsky District, Voronezh Oblast =

Troitsky Троицкий
- Settlement
- Location within Voronezh Oblast Location within Russia
- Coordinates: 51°15′N 40°41′E
- Country: Russia
- Region: Voronezh Oblast
- District: Talovsky District
- Time zone: UTC+3:00

Troitsky (Russian: Троицкий) is a rural locality (a settlement) in Alexandrovskoye Rural Settlement, Talovsky District, Voronezh Oblast, Russia. The population was 384 as of 2010. There are 6 streets.

== Geography ==
It is located 13 km north from Talovaya.
