= Bragino, Vyaznikovsky District, Vladimir Oblast =

Bragino Брагино
- Village
- Location within Vladimir Oblast Location within Russia
- Coordinates: 56°14′N 42°19′E
- Country: Russia
- Region: Vladimir Oblast
- District: Vyaznikovsky District
- Time zone: UTC+3:00

Bragino (Russian: Брагино) is a rural locality (a village) in Gorod Vyazniki, Vyaznikovsky District, Vladimir Oblast, Russia. The population was 5 as of 2010.

== Geography ==
Bragino is located on the Klyazma River, 13 km east of Vyazniki (the district's administrative centre) by road. Rudilnitsy is the nearest rural locality.
