= Novotroitskoye, Iglinsky District, Republic of Bashkortostan =

Novotroitskoye Новотроицкое
- Village
- Location within Bashkortostan Location within Russia
- Coordinates: 54°52′N 56°41′E
- Country: Russia
- Region: Bashkortostan
- District: Iglinsky District
- Time zone: UTC+5:00

Novotroitskoye (Russian: Новотроицкое) is a rural locality (a village) in Tavtimanovsky Selsoviet, Iglinsky District, Bashkortostan, Russia. The population was 63 as of 2010. There are 2 streets.

== Geography ==
Novotroitskoye is located on the right bank of the Lobovka River, 25 km east of Iglino (the district's administrative centre) by road. Kudeyevsky is the nearest rural locality.
