= Refandy =

Village in Mishkinsky District, Bashkortostan, Russia

Refandy Рефанды
- Village
- Location within Bashkortostan Location within Russia
- Coordinates: 55°42′N 56°12′E
- Country: Russia
- Region: Bashkortostan
- District: Mishkinsky District
- Time zone: UTC+5:00

Refandy (Russian: Рефанды; Bashkir: Рәфәнде, Räfände; Meadow Mari: Козаш, Kozaš) is a rural locality (a village) in Novotroitsky Selsoviet, Mishkinsky District, Bashkortostan, Russia. The population was 249 as of 2010. There are 7 streets.

== Geography ==
Refandy is located 26 km northeast of Mishkino (the district's administrative centre) by road. Biryubash is the nearest rural locality.
