= Novotroitsky, Voronezh Oblast =

Novotroitsky Новотроицкий
- Settlement
- Location within Voronezh Oblast Location within Russia
- Coordinates: 51°10′N 40°43′E
- Country: Russia
- Region: Voronezh Oblast
- District: Talovsky District
- Time zone: UTC+3:00

Novotroitsky (Russian: Новотроицкий) is a rural locality (a settlement) in Alexandrovskoye Rural Settlement, Talovsky District, Voronezh Oblast, Russia. The population was 703 as of 2010. There are 6 streets.

== Geography ==
Novotroitsky is located 11 km north of Talovaya (the district's administrative centre) by road. Sergiyevsky is the nearest rural locality.
