= Troitskoye, Amur Oblast =

Troitskoye Троицкое
- Selo
- Location within Amur Oblast Location within Russia
- Coordinates: 50°45′N 127°56′E
- Country: Russia
- Region: Amur Oblast
- District: Ivanovsky District
- Time zone: UTC+9:00

Troitskoye (Russian: Троицкое) is a rural locality (a selo) in Troitsky Selsoviet of Ivanovsky District, Amur Oblast, Russia. The population was 406 as of 2018. There are 8 streets.

== Geography ==
Troitskoye is located on the left bank of the Belaya River, 58 km north of Ivanovka (the district's administrative centre) by road. Srednebelaya is the nearest rural locality.
