= Troinka =

Troinka Троинка
- Selo
- Location within Altai Krai Location within Russia
- Coordinates: 51°30′N 81°37′E
- Country: Russia
- Region: Altai Krai
- District: Rubtsovsky District
- Time zone: UTC+7:00

Troinka (Russian: Троинка) is a rural locality (a selo) in Dalny Selsoviet, Rubtsovsky District, Altai Krai, Russia. The population was 147 as of 2013. There are 2 streets.

== Geography ==
Troinka is located 46 km east of Rubtsovsk (the district's administrative centre) by road. Dalny is the nearest rural locality.
