= Troitsky, Belgorod Oblast =

Troitsky Троицкий
- Settlement
- Location within Belgorod Oblast Location within Russia
- Coordinates: 51°21′N 37°29′E
- Country: Russia
- Region: Belgorod Oblast
- District: Gubkinsky District
- Time zone: UTC+3:00

Troitsky (Russian: Троицкий) is a rural locality (a settlement) and the administrative center of Troitskaya Territorial Administration, Gubkinsky District, Belgorod Oblast, Russia. The population was 6,214 as of 2010. There are 12 streets.

== Geography ==
Troitsky is located 12 km north of Gubkin (the district's administrative centre) by road. Mikhaylovsky is the nearest rural locality.
