= Novotroitskoye, Petropavlovsky District, Voronezh Oblast =

Novotroitskoye Новотроицкое
- Selo
- Location within Voronezh Oblast Location within Russia
- Coordinates: 50°07′N 41°05′E
- Country: Russia
- Region: Voronezh Oblast
- District: Petropavlovsky District
- Time zone: UTC+3:00

Novotroitskoye (Russian: Новотроицкое) is a rural locality (a selo) and the administrative center of Novotroitskoye Rural Settlement, Petropavlovsky District, Voronezh Oblast, Russia. The population was 698 as of 2010. There are 10 streets.
