= Novotroitskoye, Chishminsky District, Republic of Bashkortostan =

Rural locality in Russia

Novotroitskoye Новотроицкое
- Selo
- Location within Bashkortostan Location within Russia
- Coordinates: 54°28′N 55°31′E
- Country: Russia
- Region: Bashkortostan
- District: Chishminsky District
- Time zone: UTC+5:00

Novotroitskoye (Russian: Новотроицкое) is a rural locality (a selo) and the administrative centre of Novotroitsky Selsoviet, Chishminsky District, Bashkortostan, Russia. The rural locality has 11 streets and, as of 2010, a population of 411.

== Geography ==
Novotroitskoye is located 22 km southeast of Chishmy, the district's administrative centre. Novosayranovo is the nearest rural locality.
