= Novotroitskoye, Konstantinovsky District, Amur Oblast =

Novotroitskoye Новотроицкое
- Selo
- Location within Amur Oblast Location within Russia
- Coordinates: 49°48′N 128°04′E
- Country: Russia
- Region: Amur Oblast
- District: Konstantinovsky District
- Time zone: UTC+9:00

Novotroitskoye (Russian: Новотроицкое) is a rural locality (a selo) in Novotroitsky Selsoviet of Konstantinovsky District, Amur Oblast, Russia. The population was 457 as of 2018. There are 8 streets.

== Geography ==
Novotroitskoye is located 26 km north of Konstantinovka (the district's administrative centre) by road. Verkhny Urtuy is the nearest rural locality.
