= Troitskoye, Korenevsky District, Kursk Oblast =

Troitskoye Троицкое
- Village
- Interactive map of Troitskoye
- Location of Troitskoye Troitskoye (Russia)
- Coordinates: 51°12′N 34°48′E
- Country: Russia
- Federal subject: Kursk Oblast
- Administrative district: Korenevsky District
- Selsoviet: Viktorovka

Population (2010 Census)
  - Total: 270
  - Estimate (2010): 270 (0%)
- Time zone: UTC+3 (MSK)
- Postal code: 307440
- OKTMO ID: 38618412126

Troitskoye (Russian: Троицкое) is a village in western Russia, in Korenevsky District of Kursk Oblast.

== Geography ==
The village is located in the basin of the Sinyak River, 1 kilometre (0.62 mi) from the Russian-Ukrainian border, 112 kilometres (70 mi) southwest of Kursk, 24.5 kilometres (15.2 mi) south of the district centre — urban-type settlement Korenevo, 6 kilometres (3.7 mi) from the centre of the village council — Viktorovka.

== History ==
=== Russian invasion of Ukraine ===
The settlement came under the control of the Armed Forces of Ukraine in the middle of August 2024 as part of the August 2024 Kursk Oblast incursion of the Russian invasion of Ukraine.
