= Novotroitskoye, Bakalinsky District, Republic of Bashkortostan =

Novotroitskoye Новотроицкое
- Village
- Location within Bashkortostan Location within Russia
- Coordinates: 55°14′N 53°48′E
- Country: Russia
- Region: Bashkortostan
- District: Bakalinsky District
- Time zone: UTC+5:00

Novotroitskoye (Russian: Новотроицкое) is a rural locality (a village) in Starosharashlinsky Selsoviet, Bakalinsky District, Bashkortostan, Russia. The population was 11 as of 2010. There is 1 street.

== Geography ==
- To the district center (Bakaly): 7 km
- To the center of the village council (Old Sharashly): 3 km
- Nearest railway station (Tuimazy): 82 km

Novotroitskoye is located 8 km north of Bakaly (the district's administrative centre) by road. Verkhnetroitskoye is the nearest rural locality.
