= Cheremshanka, Altai Republic =

Cheremshanka Черемшанка
- Settlement
- Location within Altai Republic Location within Russia
- Coordinates: 51°52′N 85°46′E
- Country: Russia
- Region: Altai Republic
- District: Mayminsky District
- Time zone: UTC+7:00

Cheremshanka (Russian: Черемшанка; Altay: Калбалу, Kalbalu) is a rural locality (a selo) in Souzginskoye Rural Settlement of Mayminsky District, the Altai Republic, Russia. The population was 445 as of 2016.

== Geography ==
Cheremshanka is located on the Katun River, 22 km south of Mayma (the district's administrative centre) by road. There are 8 streets. Turbaza "Yunost" is the nearest rural locality. Cheremshanka is located near Mount Sukhaya and Tiberkul Lake.

== Culture ==
Cheremshanka is home to Old Believers and to the followers of Vissarion, who was born Sergei Torop and is believed to be the reborn Jesus Christ. He is the founder of the Church of the Last Testament.

Cheremshanka is one of several eco-villages inhabited by the followers of Vissarion near Tiberkul Lake. The villages comprise the Abode of Dawn settlement and include the villages of Gulyaevka, Petropavlovka, Tyukhtyat, and Zharovsk.

Local legend states that Tiberkul Lake marks the way to the mythical Belovodye.

=== Religion ===
The Christian community believes in reincarnation, veganism, harmonious human relations, and predicting the end of the world. The Church of the Last Testament follows many aspects of the Russian Orthodox Church in addition to aspects of Buddhism and Taoism.

=== Cuisine ===
Since the 20th century, the Christian community has been all-vegetarian, with honey being their only animal-derived food source. The residents of Cheremshanka eat locally-grown food staples that include rye, wheat, buckwheat, millet, rice, peas, lentils, and soybeans. These staples are supplemented with potatoes, carrots, beets, radishes, cabbage, onions, squash, apples, wild berries, dried fruits, nettle, dandelions, mushrooms, and Siberian pine nuts.
