= Troitsk, Republic of Bashkortostan =

Troitsk Троицк
- Village
- Location within Bashkortostan Location within Russia
- Coordinates: 54°37′N 55°04′E
- Country: Russia
- Region: Bashkortostan
- District: Blagovarsky District
- Time zone: UTC+5:00

Troitsk (Russian: Троицк) is a rural locality (a village) in Yamakayevsky Selsoviet, Blagovarsky District, Bashkortostan, Russia. The population was 161 as of 2010. There are 2 streets.

== Geography ==
Troitsk is located 17 km south of Yazykovo (the district's administrative centre) by road. Yamakay is the nearest rural locality.
