= Novotroitskaya, Republic of Bashkortostan =

Novotroitskaya Новотроицкая
- Village
- Location within Bashkortostan Location within Russia
- Coordinates: 52°41′36″N 56°01′38″E
- Country: Russia
- Region: Bashkortostan
- District: Kuyurgazinsky District
- Time zone: UTC+5:00

Novotroitskaya (Russian: Новотроицкая) is a rural locality (a village) in Krivle-Ilyushkinsky Selsoviet, Kuyurgazinsky District, Bashkortostan, Russia. The population was 38 as of 2010. There is 1 street.

== Geography ==
Novotroitskaya is located 20 km east of Yermolayevo (the district's administrative centre) by road. Krivle-Ilyushkino is the nearest rural locality.
