= Troitskoye, Cherepovetsky District, Vologda Oblast =

Troitskoye Троицкое
- Village
- Location within Vologda Oblast Location within Russia
- Coordinates: 59°37′N 38°03′E
- Country: Russia
- Region: Vologda Oblast
- District: Cherepovetsky District
- Time zone: UTC+3:00

Troitskoye (Russian: Троицкое) is a rural locality (a village) in Voskresenskoye Rural Settlement, Cherepovetsky District, Vologda Oblast, Russia. The population was 3 as of 2002.

== Geography ==
Troitskoye is located 65 km northeast of Cherepovets (the district's administrative centre) by road. Panteleymonovskoye is the nearest rural locality.
