= Troitskoye, Meleuzovsky District, Republic of Bashkortostan =

Troitskoye Троицкое
- Selo
- Location within Bashkortostan Location within Russia
- Coordinates: 53°00′N 55°49′E
- Country: Russia
- Region: Bashkortostan
- District: Meleuzovsky District
- Time zone: UTC+5:00

Troitskoye (Russian: Троицкое) is a rural locality (a selo) in Partizansky Selsoviet, Meleuzovsky District, Bashkortostan, Russia. The population was 630 as of 2010. There are 6 streets.

== Geography ==
Troitskoye is located 15 km northwest of Meleuz (the district's administrative centre) by road. Romanovka is the nearest rural locality.
