= Novotroitskoye, Ternovsky District, Voronezh Oblast =

Novotroitskoye Новотроицкое
- Selo
- Location within Voronezh Oblast Location within Russia
- Coordinates: 51°39′N 41°25′E
- Country: Russia
- Region: Voronezh Oblast
- District: Ternovsky District
- Time zone: UTC+3:00

Novotroitskoye (Russian: Новотроицкое) is a rural locality (a village) and the administrative center of Novokirsanovskoye Rural Settlement, Ternovsky District, Voronezh Oblast, Russia. The population was 579 as of 2010. There are 9 streets.

== Geography ==
Novotroitskoye is located 20 km west of Ternovka (the district's administrative centre) by road. Rusanovo is the nearest rural locality.
