= Troitsk, Kulundinsky District, Altai Krai =

Troitsk Троицк
- Selo
- Location within Altai Krai Location within Russia
- Coordinates: 52°37′N 78°46′E
- Country: Russia
- Region: Altai Krai
- District: Kulundinsky District
- Time zone: UTC+7:00

Troitsk (Russian: Троицк) is a rural locality (a selo) in Oktyabrsky Selsoviet, Kulundinsky District, Altai Krai, Russia. The population was 180 as of 2013. There are 3 streets.

== Geography ==
Troitsk is located 18 km northwest of Kulunda (the district's administrative centre) by road. Oktyabrsky is the nearest rural locality.
