= Troitsky dugout =

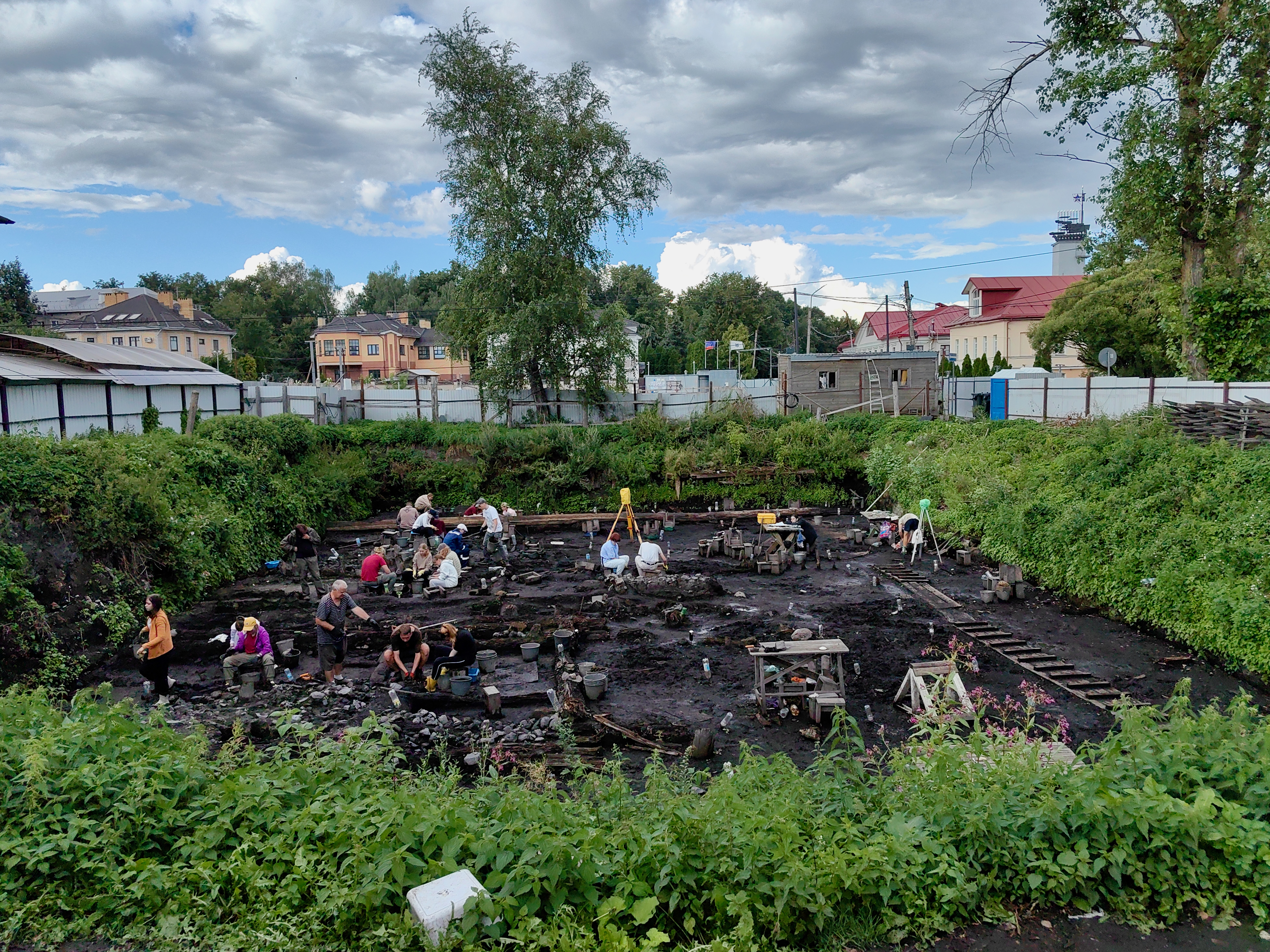
Troitsky dugout excavations in August 2025

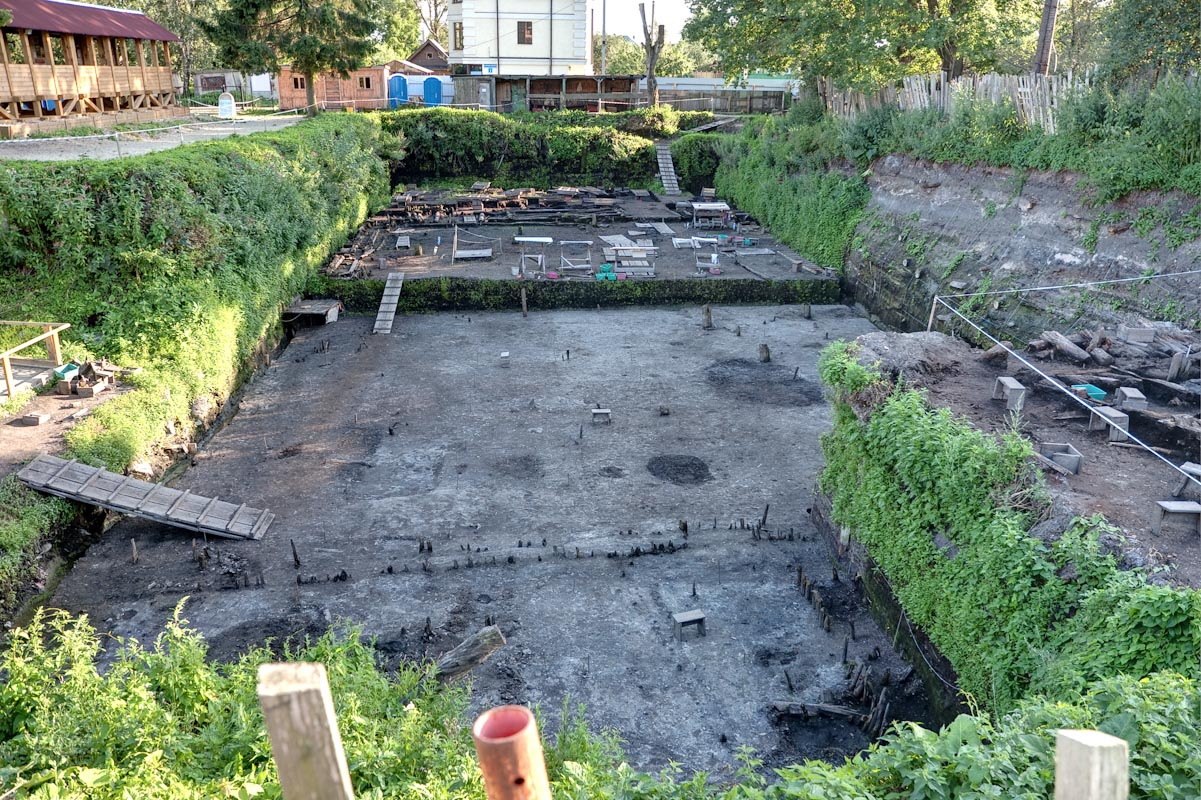
Troitsky dugout in 2009

Troitsky dugout (Russian: Троицкий раскоп) is a long-running archaeological excavation in Veliky Novgorod, Russia. The site was first laid out in 1973 at the corner of today's Proletarskaya and Meretskov streets and took its name from the Church of the Trinity located 83 meters to the south; the spot was chosen amid planned landscaping for a nearby Victory monument. Fieldwork grew from an initial 320 m^{2} trench (Troitsky I) into adjacent areas (Troitsky II–V), with more than 1,140 m^{2} examined by the late 1970s.

Excavations revealed deep urban cultural layers—some of the earliest dating to the 920s–930s—and multi-layered wooden street pavements, which together enabled construction of an absolute dendrochronological timescale for the area. Researchers mapped several medieval homesteads (Estates A, B, and V) and traced the alignments of ancient streets, including Proboynaya (roughly modern Proletarskaya) and the east–west Chernitsyna and Ryaditina. The team also documented heavy disturbances from 16th–17th-century fortification works near the Novinsky bastion and the Okolny Gorod riverside wall, which removed upper horizons and backfilled them with gravel and sand.

Multiple birch bark letters in Old Novgorodian dialect were found at the site.
