= Troitsky, Republic of Buryatia =

Troitsky Троицкий
- Settlement
- Location within Republic of Buryatia Location within Russia
- Coordinates: 54°35′N 113°09′E
- Country: Russia
- Region: Republic of Buryatia
- District: Bauntovsky District
- Time zone: UTC+8:00

Troitsky (Russian: Троицкий) is a rural locality (a settlement) in Bauntovsky District, Republic of Buryatia, Russia. The population was 13 as of 2010. There is 1 street.

== Geography ==
Troitsky is located 47 km northwest of Bagdarin (the district's administrative centre) by road.
