= Troitsky Okrug =

Troitsky Okrug may refer to:

- Troitsky Administrative Okrug, an administrative okrug of Moscow, Russia
- Troitsky Urban Okrug, a municipal formation, which the town of Troitsk, Chelyabinsk Oblast, Russia, in incorporated as
