= Yeltsovka, Yeltsovsky District, Altai Krai =

Rural locality in Altai Krai, Russia

Yeltsovka Ельцовка
- Selo
- Interactive map of Yeltsovka
- Location of Yeltsovka Yeltsovka (Altai Krai)
- Coordinates: 53°15′20″N 86°15′42″E
- Country: Russia
- Federal subject: Altai Krai
- Administrative district: Yeltsovsky District
- SelsovietSelsoviet: Yeltsovsky Selsoviet
- Founded: 1770

Population (2010 Census)
  - Total: 2,861
  - Estimate (2021): 2,871 (+0.3%)

Administrative status
  - Capital of: Yeltsovsky District, Yeltsovsky Selsoviet

Municipal status
  - Municipal district: Yeltsovsky Municipal District
  - Rural settlement: Yeltsovsky Selsoviet Rural Settlement
  - Capital of: Yeltsovsky Municipal District, Yeltsovsky Selsoviet Rural Settlement
- Time zone: UTC+7 (MSK+4)
- Postal code: 659470
- OKTMO ID: 01610422101

Yeltsovka (Russian: Ельцовка) is a rural locality (a selo) and the administrative center of Yeltsovsky District of Altai Krai, Russia. Population: 2,861 (2010 census); 3,337 (2002 census); 3,561 (1989 Soviet census).
