= Yeltsovsky District =

Yeltsovsky District Ельцовский район (Russian)
- District
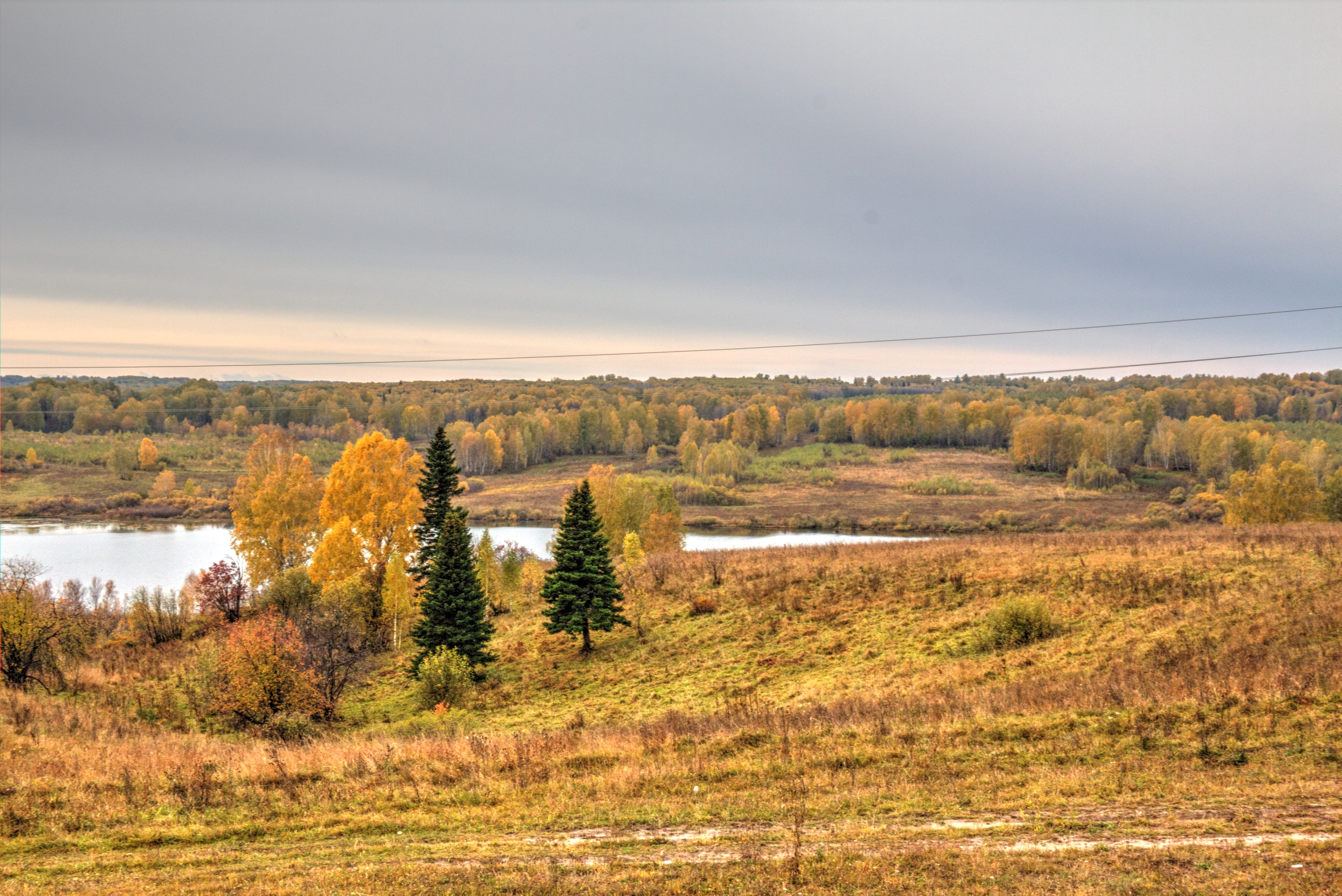
- Autumn in Yeltsovskiy District

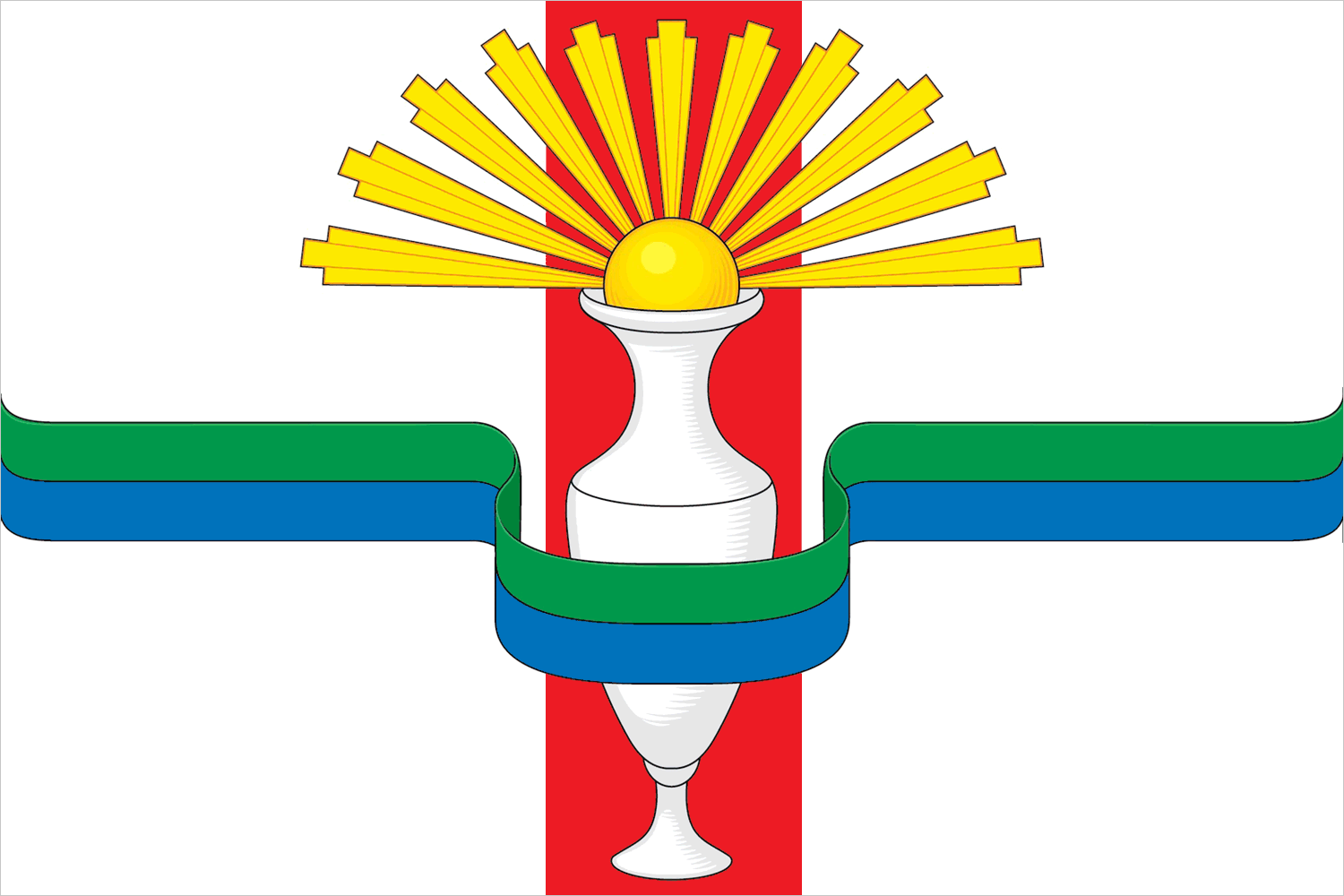
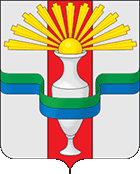
- Flag Coat of arms
- Location of Yeltsovsky District in Altai Krai
- Coordinates: 53°15′00″N 86°25′00″E
- Country: Russia
- Federal subject: Altai Krai
- Established: 1924
- Administrative center: Yeltsovka

Area
  - Total: 2,158 km^{2} (833 sq mi)

Population (2010 Census)
  - Total: 6,339
  - Density: 2.937/km^{2} (7.608/sq mi)
  - Urban: 0%
  - Rural: 100%

Administrative structure
  - Administrative divisions: 6 selsoviet
  - Inhabited localities: 17 rural localities

Municipal structure
  - Municipally incorporated as: Yeltsovsky Municipal District
  - Municipal divisions: 0 urban settlements, 6 rural settlements
- Time zone: UTC+7 (MSK+4)
- OKTMO ID: 01610000
- Website: www.altairegion22.ru

Yeltsovsky District (Russian: Ельцо́вский райо́н) is an administrative and municipal district (raion), one of the fifty-nine in Altai Krai, Russia. It is located in the east of the krai. The area of the district is 2,158 square kilometers (833 sq mi). Its administrative center is the rural locality (a selo) of Yeltsovka. Population: 6,339 (2010 census); 7,923 (2002 census); 9,232 (1989 Soviet census). The population of Yeltsovka accounts for 45.1% of the district's total population.
