= Chernushka, Chernushinsky District, Perm Krai =

Town in Perm Krai, Russia

Chernushka Чернушка
- Town
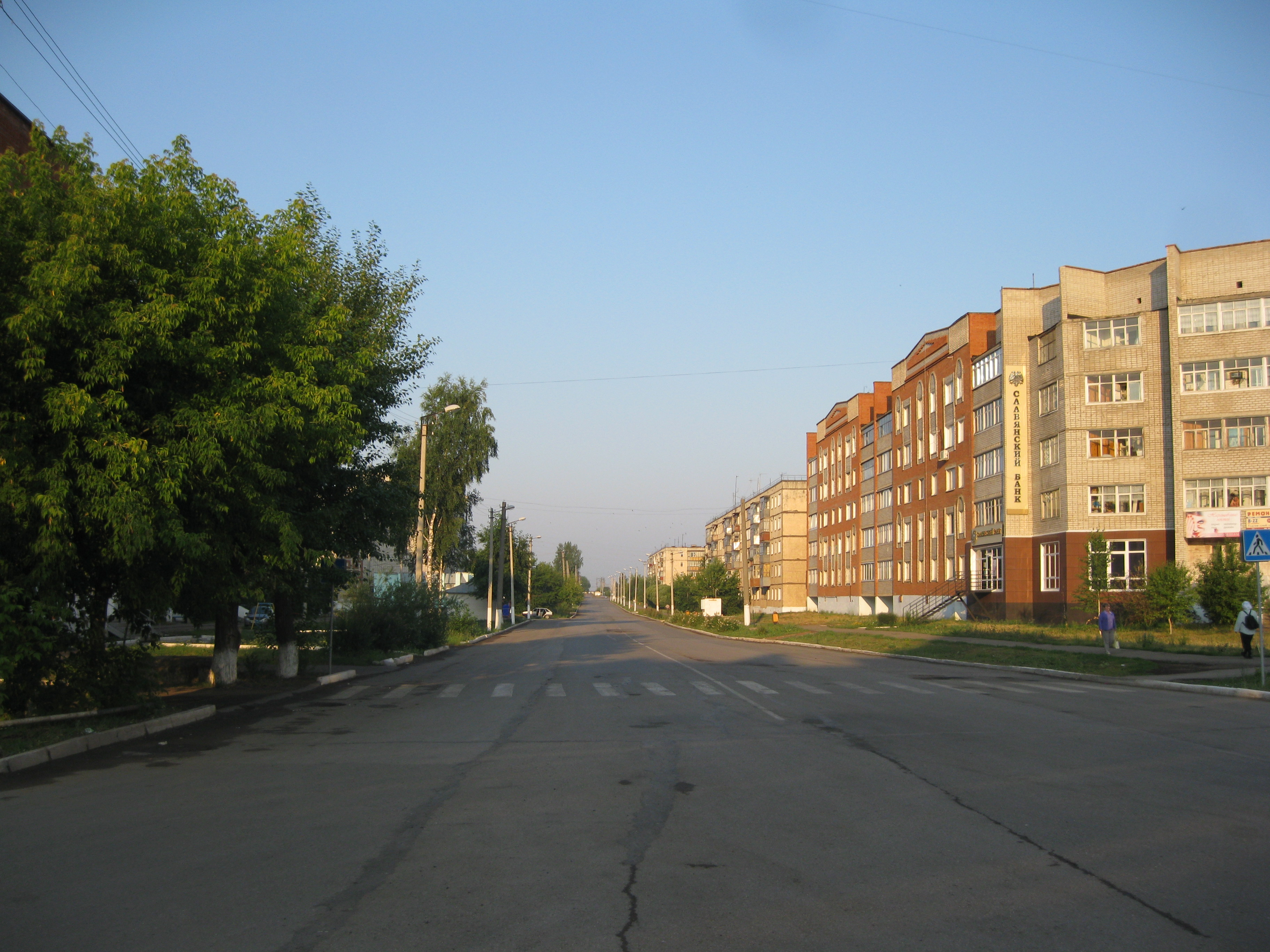
- Mira Street in Chernushka

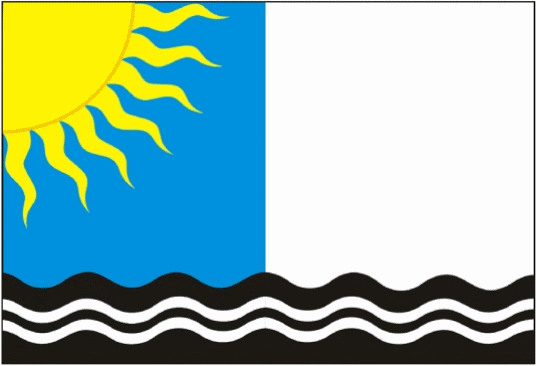
- Flag Coat of arms
- Interactive map of Chernushka
- Location of Chernushka Chernushka (Perm Krai)
- Coordinates: 56°31′N 56°06′E
- Country: Russia
- Federal subject: Perm Krai
- Administrative district: Chernushinsky District
- Founded: 1854
- Town status since: 1966
- Elevation: 150 m (490 ft)

Population (2010 Census)
  - Total: 33,272
  - Estimate (2023): 33,092 (−0.5%)

Administrative status
  - Capital of: Chernushinsky District

Municipal status
  - Municipal district: Chernushinsky Municipal District
  - Urban settlement: Chernushinskoye Urban Settlement
  - Capital of: Chernushinsky Municipal District, Chernushinskoye Urban Settlement
- Time zone: UTC+5 (MSK+2)
- Postal codes: 617830–617834, 617839
- OKTMO ID: 57757000001
- Website: www.chernushka59.ru

Chernushka (Russian: Черну́шка) is a town and the administrative center of Chernushinsky District in Perm Krai, Russia, located on the Bystry Tanyp River, which is 230 kilometers (140 mi) south of Perm, the administrative center of the krai. Population: 33,272 (2010 census); 35,713 (2002 census); 34,835 (1989 Soviet census).

== History ==
It was first mentioned in 1858 as a village with four households that had existed since 1854. In 1869, the number of households increased to thirty-five.

The construction of the Kazan–Yekaterinburg railway during 1913–1920 played an important role in the development of the village. A settlement for the railway builders, which shared the same name, was established near the village. During the Civil War, the area of what is now Chernushinsky District saw heavy fighting along the railway and in the settlement itself.

In 1925, the administrative center of the district was transferred from Ryabki to Chernushka because Ryabky was too far from the railway. Consequently, the district itself was renamed Chernushinsky. However, the district's administration did not move to Chernushka until 1930.

The following years saw an increase of industrial construction. After World War II, Chernushka was granted work settlement status. The discovery of oil boosted Chernushka's development, as several oil plants were built in 1958. In 1966, Chernushka was granted town status.

== Administrative and municipal status ==
Within the framework of administrative divisions, Chernushka serves as the administrative center of Chernushinsky District, to which it is directly subordinated. As a municipal division, the town of Chernushka, together with the settlement of Azinsky, is incorporated within Chernushinsky Municipal District as Chernushinskoye Urban Settlement.

== Economy ==
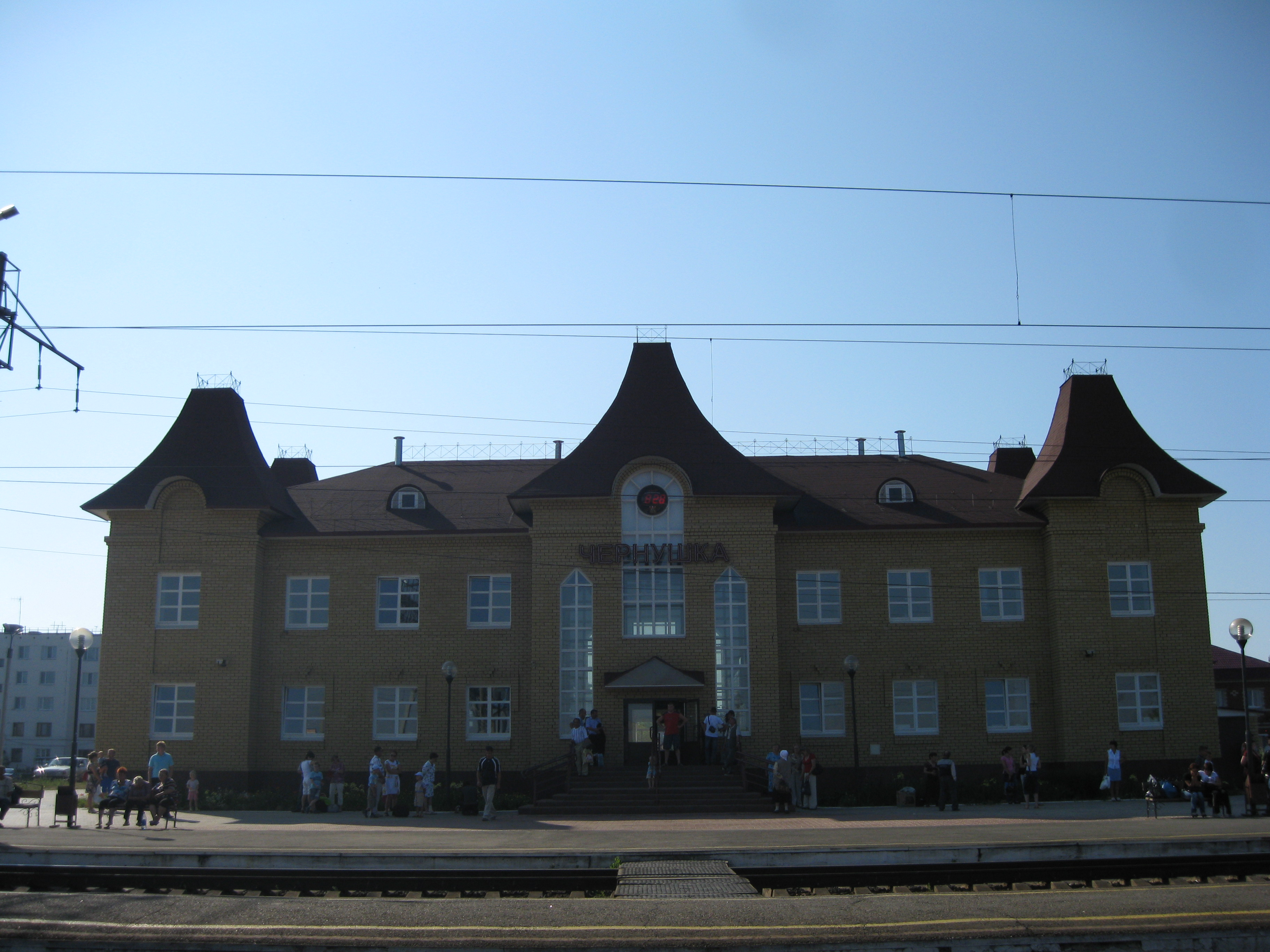
Chernushka railway station

The town's economy is based on oil extraction and refining industry, the production of construction materials, and the food industry. It is a major transportation hub in southern Perm Krai.
