= Chernushinsky District =

Chernushinsky District Чернушинский район (Russian)
- District
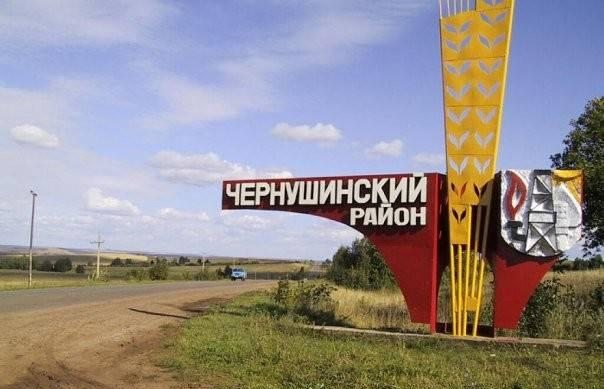
- Welcome sign at the entrance to Chernushinsky District

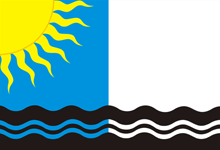
- Flag Coat of arms
- Location of Chernushinsky District in Perm Krai
- Coordinates: 56°30′N 56°15′E
- Country: Russia
- Federal subject: Perm Krai
- Established: 1925
- Administrative center: Chernushka

Area
  - Total: 1,676 km^{2} (647 sq mi)

Population (2010 Census)
  - Total: 50,593
  - Density: 30.19/km^{2} (78.18/sq mi)
  - Urban: 65.8%
  - Rural: 34.2%

Administrative structure
  - Inhabited localities: 1 cities/towns, 74 rural localities

Municipal structure
  - Municipally incorporated as: Chernushinsky Municipal District
  - Municipal divisions: 1 urban settlements, 14 rural settlements
- Time zone: UTC+5 (MSK+2)
- OKTMO ID: 57657000
- Website: http://www.chernadm.ru/

Chernushinsky District (Russian: Черну́шинский райо́н) is an administrative district (raion) of Perm Krai, Russia; one of the thirty-three in the krai. Municipally, it is incorporated as Chernushinsky Municipal District. It is located in the south of the krai and borders with Uinsky District in the north, Oktyabrsky District in the east, the Republic of Bashkortostan in the south, Kuyedinsky District in the west, and with Bardymsky District in the northwest. The area of the district is 1,676 square kilometers (647 sq mi). Its administrative center is the town of Chernushka. Population: 50,593 (2010 census); 53,746 (2002 census); 51,743 (1989 Soviet census). The population of Chernushka accounts for 65.8% of the district's total population.

== Geography ==
The district stretches for 54 kilometers (34 mi) from north to south and for approximately 56 kilometers (35 mi) from east to west. Geologically, it is located on the eastern outskirts of the East European craton. District's landscape is mostly flat with some hills. Major rivers include the Bystry Tanyp and the Tyuy. There are eighty-one ponds in the district, ten of which have a volume of over 100,000 cubic meters (3,500,000 cu ft), and the largest of which are Ryabovsky and Trushnikovsky Ponds. About 26% of the total district's territory is covered by forests.

=== Climate ===
The climate is temperate continental with relatively long and cold winters and warm summers. Average annual temperature is +1.5 °C (34.7 °F). Average January temperature is −15.6 °C (3.9 °F) and average July temperature is +18.4 °C (65.1 °F). Record high temperature is +37 °C (99 °F) (July 1952) and record low is −54 °C (−65 °F) (January 1, 1979). Annual precipitation is about 583 millimeters (23.0 in).

== History ==
The district was established in 1925. In 1931, Ryabkovsky District was merged into it. In October 1938, the district became a part of Perm Oblast.

== Demographics ==
Ethnic composition, according to the 2002 Census:

- Russians: 77.4%
- Tatars: 7.6%
- Bashkirs: 6.6%
- Udmurt people: 4.3%

There are also Chuvash people, Mari people and other ethnic minorities living in the district.

== Economy ==
The economy of the district is based on oil industry, production of building materials, food industry, and agriculture.

There are several explored oil fields in the district, with the major one being the Pavlovskoye Field. There are also deposits of building materials in the district.

== Sources ==
- Законодательное собрание Пермской области. Закон №416-67 от 28 февраля 1996 г. «Об административно-территориальном устройстве Пермского края», в ред. Закона №504-ПК от 9 июля 2015 г. «О внесении изменений в Закон Пермской области "Об административно-территориальном устройстве Пермского края"». Вступил в силу с момента опубликования. Опубликован: "Звезда", №38, 12 марта 1996 г. (Legislative Assembly of Perm Oblast. Law #416-67 of February 28, 1996 On the Administrative-Territorial Structure of Perm Krai, as amended by the Law #504-PK of July 9, 2015 On Amending the Law of Perm Oblast "On the Administrative-Territorial Structure of Perm Krai". Effective as of the moment of publication.).
- Законодательное собрание Пермской области. Закон №1882-409 от 9 декабря 2004 г. «Об утверждении границ и о наделении статусом муниципальных образований Чернушинского района Пермского края», в ред. Закона №175-ПК от 7 марта 2013 г. «О внесении изменений в отдельные Законы Пермской области, Коми-Пермяцкого автономного округа об утверждении границ и о наделении статусом муниципальных образований Пермского края». Вступил в силу через десять дней со дня официального опубликования. Опубликован: "Российская Газета", №283, 22 декабря 2004 г. (Legislative Assembly of Perm Oblast. Law #1882-409 of December 9, 2004 On Establishing the Borders and on Granting the Status to the Municipal Formations of Chernushinsky District of Perm Krai, as amended by the Law #175-PK of March 7, 2013 On Amending Various Laws of Perm Oblast, Komi-Permyak Autonomous Okrug on Establishing the Borders and on Granting the Status to the Municipal Formations of Perm Krai. Effective as of the day which is ten days following the day of the official publication.).
