= Rassvet, Russia =

Rassvet (Russian: Рассвет) is the name of several rural localities in Russia.

== Altai Krai ==
As of 2010, three rural localities in Altai Krai bear this name:

- Rassvet, Khabarsky District, Altai Krai, a settlement in Martovsky Selsoviet of Khabarsky District
- Rassvet, Romanovsky District, Altai Krai, a settlement in Rassvetovsky Selsoviet of Romanovsky District
- Rassvet, Talmensky District, Altai Krai, a settlement in Kurochkinsky Selsoviet of Talmensky District

== Astrakhan Oblast ==
As of 2010, one rural locality in Astrakhan Oblast bears this name:

- Rassvet, Astrakhan Oblast, a selo in Rassvetsky Selsoviet of Narimanovsky District

== Republic of Bashkortostan ==
As of 2010, six rural localities in the Republic of Bashkortostan bear this name:

- Rassvet, Belebeyevsky District, Republic of Bashkortostan, a village in Rassvetovsky Selsoviet of Belebeyevsky District
- Rassvet, Buzdyaksky District, Republic of Bashkortostan, a selo in Gafuriysky Selsoviet of Buzdyaksky District
- Rassvet, Davlekanovsky District, Republic of Bashkortostan, a selo in Rassvetovsky Selsoviet of Davlekanovsky District
- Rassvet, Iglinsky District, Republic of Bashkortostan, a village in Krasnovoskhodsky Selsoviet of Iglinsky District
- Rassvet, Meleuzovsky District, Republic of Bashkortostan, a village in Meleuzovsky Selsoviet of Meleuzovsky District
- Rassvet, Miyakinsky District, Republic of Bashkortostan, a village in Bikkulovsky Selsoviet of Miyakinsky District

== Bryansk Oblast ==
As of 2010, one rural locality in Bryansk Oblast bears this name:

- Rassvet, Bryansk Oblast, a village in Maltinsky Selsoviet of Karachevsky District

== Chelyabinsk Oblast ==
As of 2010, one rural locality in Chelyabinsk Oblast bears this name:

- Rassvet, Chelyabinsk Oblast, a settlement in Fershampenuazsky Selsoviet of Nagaybaksky District

== Republic of Dagestan ==
As of 2010, one rural locality in the Republic of Dagestan bears this name:

- Rassvet, Republic of Dagestan, a selo in Ullubiyevsky Selsoviet of Tarumovsky District

== Irkutsk Oblast ==
As of 2010, one rural locality in Irkutsk Oblast bears this name:

- Rassvet, Irkutsk Oblast, a settlement in Osinsky District

== Kaliningrad Oblast ==
As of 2010, one rural locality in Kaliningrad Oblast bears this name:

- Rassvet, Kaliningrad Oblast, a settlement in Dobrinsky Rural Okrug of Guryevsky District

== Republic of Kalmykia ==
As of 2010, one rural locality in the Republic of Kalmykia bears this name:

- Rassvet, Republic of Kalmykia, a settlement in Khulkhutinskaya Rural Administration of Yashkulsky District

== Kaluga Oblast ==
As of 2010, one rural locality in Kaluga Oblast bears this name:

- Rassvet, Kaluga Oblast, a village in Duminichsky District

== Kemerovo Oblast ==
As of 2010, two rural localities in Kemerovo Oblast bear this name:

- Rassvet, Novokuznetsky District, Kemerovo Oblast, a settlement in Bungurskaya Rural Territory of Novokuznetsky District
- Rassvet, Topkinsky District, Kemerovo Oblast, a settlement in Solominskaya Rural Territory of Topkinsky District

== Kirov Oblast ==
As of 2010, one rural locality in Kirov Oblast bears this name:

- Rassvet, Kirov Oblast, a settlement in Korlyakovsky Rural Okrug of Sanchursky District

== Krasnodar Krai ==
As of 2010, three rural localities in Krasnodar Krai bear this name:

- Rassvet, Anapsky District, Krasnodar Krai, a khutor in Gaykodzorsky Rural Okrug of Anapsky District
- Rassvet, Starominsky District, Krasnodar Krai, a settlement in Rassvetovsky Rural Okrug of Starominsky District
- Rassvet, Yeysky District, Krasnodar Krai, a khutor in Aleksandrovsky Rural Okrug of Yeysky District

== Krasnoyarsk Krai ==
As of 2012, one rural locality in Krasnoyarsk Krai bears this name:

- Rassvet, Krasnoyarsk Krai, a settlement in Rassvetovsky Selsoviet of Birilyussky District

== Kurgan Oblast ==
As of 2010, one rural locality in Kurgan Oblast bears this name:

- Rassvet, Kurgan Oblast, a selo in Rassvetsky Selsoviet of Mokrousovsky District

== Kursk Oblast ==
As of 2010, one rural locality in Kursk Oblast bears this name:

- Rassvet, Kursk Oblast, a village in Vablinsky Selsoviet of Konyshyovsky District

== Leningrad Oblast ==
As of 2010, one rural locality in Leningrad Oblast bears this name:

- Rassvet, Leningrad Oblast, a logging depot settlement in Vakhnovokarskoye Settlement Municipal Formation of Lodeynopolsky District

== Lipetsk Oblast ==
As of 2010, one rural locality in Lipetsk Oblast bears this name:

- Rassvet, Lipetsk Oblast, a settlement in Lebyazhensky Selsoviet of Izmalkovsky District

== Republic of North Ossetia–Alania ==
As of 2010, one rural locality in the Republic of North Ossetia–Alania bears this name:

- Rassvet, Republic of North Ossetia–Alania, a selo in Rassvetsky Rural Okrug of Ardonsky District

== Novgorod Oblast ==
As of 2010, one rural locality in Novgorod Oblast bears this name:

- Rassvet, Novgorod Oblast, a village under the administrative jurisdiction of the urban-type settlement of Uglovka, Okulovsky District

== Omsk Oblast ==
As of 2010, one rural locality in Omsk Oblast bears this name:

- Rassvet, Omsk Oblast, a village in Bolshakovsky Rural Okrug of Lyubinsky District

== Orenburg Oblast ==
As of 2010, one rural locality in Orenburg Oblast bears this name:

- Rassvet, Orenburg Oblast, a settlement in Akzharsky Selsoviet of Yasnensky District

== Oryol Oblast ==
As of 2010, two rural localities in Oryol Oblast bear this name:

- Rassvet, Mtsensky District, Oryol Oblast, a settlement in Anikanovsky Selsoviet of Mtsensky District
- Rassvet, Verkhovsky District, Oryol Oblast, a settlement in Russko-Brodsky Selsoviet of Verkhovsky District

== Rostov Oblast ==
As of 2010, four rural localities in Rostov Oblast bear this name:

- Rassvet, Aksaysky District, Rostov Oblast, a settlement in Rassvetovskoye Rural Settlement of Aksaysky District
- Rassvet, Tselinsky District, Rostov Oblast, a khutor in Yulovskoye Rural Settlement of Tselinsky District
- Rassvet, Vesyolovsky District, Rostov Oblast, a khutor in Verkhnesolenovskoye Rural Settlement of Vesyolovsky District
- Rassvet, Yegorlyksky District, Rostov Oblast, a khutor in Rogovskoye Rural Settlement of Yegorlyksky District

== Ryazan Oblast ==
As of 2010, one rural locality in Ryazan Oblast bears this name:

- Rassvet, Ryazan Oblast, a settlement in Pesochinsky Rural Okrug of Putyatinsky District

== Samara Oblast ==
As of 2010, two rural localities in Samara Oblast bear this name:

- Rassvet, Stavropolsky District, Samara Oblast, a settlement in Stavropolsky District
- Rassvet, Volzhsky District, Samara Oblast, a selo in Volzhsky District

== Saratov Oblast ==
As of 2010, one rural locality in Saratov Oblast bears this name:

- Rassvet, Saratov Oblast, a settlement in Rovensky District

== Smolensk Oblast ==
As of 2010, one rural locality in Smolensk Oblast bears this name:

- Rassvet, Smolensk Oblast, a village in Chistikovskoye Rural Settlement of Rudnyansky District

== Stavropol Krai ==
As of 2010, one rural locality in Stavropol Krai bears this name:

- Rassvet, Stavropol Krai, a settlement in Gorkovsky Selsoviet of Novoalexandrovsky District

== Sverdlovsk Oblast ==
As of 2010, two rural localities in Sverdlovsk Oblast bear this name:

- Rassvet, Kamyshlovsky District, Sverdlovsk Oblast, a settlement in Kamyshlovsky District
- Rassvet, Slobodo-Turinsky District, Sverdlovsk Oblast, a settlement in Slobodo-Turinsky District

== Tambov Oblast ==
As of 2010, two rural localities in Tambov Oblast bear this name:

- Rassvet, Staroyuryevsky District, Tambov Oblast, a settlement in Vishnevsky Selsoviet of Staroyuryevsky District
- Rassvet, Tokaryovsky District, Tambov Oblast, a village under the administrative jurisdiction of Tokaryovsky Settlement Council of Tokaryovsky District

== Tomsk Oblast ==
As of 2010, one rural locality in Tomsk Oblast bears this name:

- Rassvet, Tomsk Oblast, a settlement in Tomsky District

== Tula Oblast ==
As of 2010, two rural localities in Tula Oblast bear this name:

- Rassvet, Leninsky District, Tula Oblast, a settlement in Rassvetovsky Rural Okrug of Leninsky District
- Rassvet, Venyovsky District, Tula Oblast, a settlement in Rassvetovsky Rural Okrug of Venyovsky District

== Tver Oblast ==
As of 2010, one rural locality in Tver Oblast bears this name:

- Rassvet, Tver Oblast, a settlement in Likhoslavlsky District

== Tyumen Oblast ==
As of 2010, two rural localities in Tyumen Oblast bear this name:

- Rassvet, Isetsky District, Tyumen Oblast, a selo in Rassvetovsky Rural Okrug of Isetsky District
- Rassvet, Omutinsky District, Tyumen Oblast, a settlement in Zhuravlevsky Rural Okrug of Omutinsky District

== Ulyanovsk Oblast ==
As of 2010, one rural locality in Ulyanovsk Oblast bears this name:

- Rassvet, Ulyanovsk Oblast, a crossing loop in Tiinsky Rural Okrug of Melekessky District

== Vladimir Oblast ==
As of 2010, one rural locality in Vladimir Oblast bears this name:

- Rassvet, Vladimir Oblast, a village in Gorokhovetsky District

== Volgograd Oblast ==
As of 2010, three rural localities in Volgograd Oblast bear this name:

- Rassvet, Ilovlinsky District, Volgograd Oblast, a settlement in Medvedevsky Selsoviet of Ilovlinsky District
- Rassvet, Kotelnikovsky District, Volgograd Oblast, a settlement in Poperechensky Selsoviet of Kotelnikovsky District
- Rassvet, Leninsky District, Volgograd Oblast, a settlement in Rassvetinsky Selsoviet of Leninsky District

== Vologda Oblast ==
As of 2010, one rural locality in Vologda Oblast bears this name:

- Rassvet, Vologda Oblast, a village in Volokoslavinsky Selsoviet of Kirillovsky District

== Voronezh Oblast ==
As of 2010, one rural locality in Voronezh Oblast bears this name:

- Rassvet, Voronezh Oblast, a settlement in Petrovskoye Rural Settlement of Pavlovsky District
