= Volkovo, Russia =

Volkovo (Russian: Волково) is the name of several rural localities in Russia.

== Modern localities ==
=== Amur Oblast ===
As of 2012, one rural locality in Amur Oblast bears this name:

- Volkovo, Amur Oblast, a selo in Volkovsky Rural Settlement of Blagoveshchensky District

=== Arkhangelsk Oblast ===
As of 2012, one rural locality in Arkhangelsk Oblast bears this name:

- Volkovo, Arkhangelsk Oblast, a village in Ukhtostrovsky Selsoviet of Kholmogorsky District

=== Republic of Bashkortostan ===
As of 2012, four rural localities in the Republic of Bashkortostan bear this name:

- Volkovo, Aurgazinsky District, Republic of Bashkortostan, a village in Tukayevsky Selsoviet of Aurgazinsky District
- Volkovo, Blagoveshchensky District, Republic of Bashkortostan, a selo in Volkovsky Selsoviet of Blagoveshchensky District
- Volkovo, Cherkassky Selsoviet, Ufimsky District, Republic of Bashkortostan, a village in Cherkassky Selsoviet of Ufimsky District
- Volkovo, Dmitriyevsky Selsoviet, Ufimsky District, Republic of Bashkortostan, a village in Dmitriyevsky Selsoviet of Ufimsky District

=== Belgorod Oblast ===
As of 2012, one rural locality in Belgorod Oblast bears this name:

- Volkovo, Belgorod Oblast, a selo in Chernyansky District

=== Chelyabinsk Oblast ===
As of 2012, one rural locality in Chelyabinsk Oblast bears this name:

- Volkovo, Chelyabinsk Oblast, a settlement under the administrative jurisdiction of the Town of Minyar in Ashinsky District

=== Ivanovo Oblast ===
As of 2012, three rural localities in Ivanovo Oblast bear this name:

- Volkovo, Lezhnevsky District, Ivanovo Oblast, a village in Lezhnevsky District
- Volkovo, Pestyakovsky District, Ivanovo Oblast, a village in Pestyakovsky District
- Volkovo, Vichugsky District, Ivanovo Oblast, a village in Vichugsky District

=== Kaluga Oblast ===
As of 2012, two rural localities in Kaluga Oblast bear this name:

- Volkovo, Babyninsky District, Kaluga Oblast, a selo in Babyninsky District
- Volkovo, Sukhinichsky District, Kaluga Oblast, a selo in Sukhinichsky District

=== Kirov Oblast ===
As of 2012, two rural localities in Kirov Oblast bear this name:

- Volkovo, Slobodskoy District, Kirov Oblast, a selo in Leninsky Rural Okrug of Slobodskoy District; 58°38′N 49°58′E
- Volkovo, Yaransky District, Kirov Oblast, a village in Shkalansky Rural Okrug of Yaransky District; 57°1′N 47°55′E

=== Kostroma Oblast ===
As of 2012, nine rural localities in Kostroma Oblast bear this name:

- Volkovo, Antropovsky District, Kostroma Oblast, a village in Prosekskoye Settlement of Antropovsky District; 58°26′N 42°58′E
- Volkovo, Chukhlomsky District, Kostroma Oblast, a village in Petrovskoye Settlement of Chukhlomsky District; 58°41′N 42°51′E
- Volkovo, Galichsky District, Kostroma Oblast, a village in Dmitriyevskoye Settlement of Galichsky District; 58°20′N 42°17′E
- Volkovo, Neysky District, Kostroma Oblast, a village in Soltanovskoye Settlement of Neysky District; 58°7′N 43°42′E
- Volkovo, Oktyabrsky District, Kostroma Oblast, a village in Pokrovskoye Settlement of Oktyabrsky District; 58°57′N 47°4′E
- Volkovo, Burdukovskoye Settlement, Soligalichsky District, Kostroma Oblast, a village in Burdukovskoye Settlement of Soligalichsky District; 59°4′N 42°33′E
- Volkovo, Pervomayskoye Settlement, Soligalichsky District, Kostroma Oblast, a village in Pervomayskoye Settlement of Soligalichsky District; 58°58′N 42°12′E
- Volkovo, Andreyevskoye Settlement, Susaninsky District, Kostroma Oblast, a village in Andreyevskoye Settlement of Susaninsky District; 58°10′N 41°15′E
- Volkovo, Chentsovskoye Settlement, Susaninsky District, Kostroma Oblast, a village in Chentsovskoye Settlement of Susaninsky District; 58°4′N 41°34′E

=== Kursk Oblast ===
As of 2012, two rural localities in Kursk Oblast bear this name:

- Volkovo, Konyshyovsky District, Kursk Oblast, a selo in Ryzhkovsky Selsoviet of Konyshyovsky District
- Volkovo, Zheleznogorsky District, Kursk Oblast, a selo in Volkovsky Selsoviet of Zheleznogorsky District

=== Leningrad Oblast ===
As of 2012, one rural locality in Leningrad Oblast bears this name:

- Volkovo, Leningrad Oblast, a village in Kuzemkinskoye Settlement Municipal Formation of Kingiseppsky District; 59°32′N 28°13′E

=== Lipetsk Oblast ===
As of 2012, one rural locality in Lipetsk Oblast bears this name:

- Volkovo, Lipetsk Oblast, a village in Vednovsky Selsoviet of Chaplyginsky District; 53°29′N 39°46′E

=== Moscow Oblast ===
As of 2012, nine rural localities in Moscow Oblast bear this name:

- Volkovo, Lotoshinsky District, Moscow Oblast, a village in Mikulinskoye Rural Settlement of Lotoshinsky District; 56°19′N 35°44′E
- Volkovo, Naro-Fominsky District, Moscow Oblast, a village under the administrative jurisdiction of the Town of Vereya in Naro-Fominsky District; 55°18′N 36°9′E
- Volkovo, Odintsovsky District, Moscow Oblast, a village in Nikolskoye Rural Settlement of Odintsovsky District; 55°40′N 36°41′E
- Volkovo, Ruzsky District, Moscow Oblast, a village in Volkovskoye Rural Settlement of Ruzsky District; 55°46′N 36°15′E
- Volkovo, Serpukhovsky District, Moscow Oblast, a village in Lipitskoye Rural Settlement of Serpukhovsky District; 54°51′N 37°24′E
- Volkovo, Stupinsky District, Moscow Oblast, a village in Leontyevskoye Rural Settlement of Stupinsky District; 55°5′N 38°27′E
- Volkovo, Guslevskoye Rural Settlement, Taldomsky District, Moscow Oblast, a village in Guslevskoye Rural Settlement of Taldomsky District; 56°34′N 37°39′E
- Volkovo, Kvashenkovskoye Rural Settlement, Taldomsky District, Moscow Oblast, a village in Kvashenkovskoye Rural Settlement of Taldomsky District; 56°51′N 37°36′E
- Volkovo, Yegoryevsky District, Moscow Oblast, a village in Ramenskoye Rural Settlement of Yegoryevsky District; 55°12′N 39°10′E

=== Nizhny Novgorod Oblast ===
As of 2012, five rural localities in Nizhny Novgorod Oblast bear this name:

- Volkovo, Chkalovsky District, Nizhny Novgorod Oblast, a village in Kotelnitsky Selsoviet of Chkalovsky District
- Volkovo, Koverninsky District, Nizhny Novgorod Oblast, a village in Gavrilovsky Selsoviet of Koverninsky District
- Volkovo, Sokolsky District, Nizhny Novgorod Oblast, a village in Mezhdurechensky Selsoviet of Sokolsky District
- Volkovo, Tonkinsky District, Nizhny Novgorod Oblast, a village in Berdnikovsky Selsoviet of Tonkinsky District
- Volkovo, Vetluzhsky District, Nizhny Novgorod Oblast, a village in Moshkinsky Selsoviet of Vetluzhsky District

=== Oryol Oblast ===
As of 2012, two rural localities in Oryol Oblast bear this name:

- Volkovo, Mtsensky District, Oryol Oblast, a village in Podmokrinsky Selsoviet of Mtsensky District
- Volkovo, Shablykinsky District, Oryol Oblast, a village in Titovsky Selsoviet of Shablykinsky District

=== Perm Krai ===
As of 2012, one rural locality in Perm Krai bears this name:

- Volkovo, Perm Krai, a village in Kishertsky District

=== Pskov Oblast ===
As of 2012, twenty rural localities in Pskov Oblast bear this name:

- Volkovo, Krasnogorodsky District, Pskov Oblast, a village in Krasnogorodsky District
- Volkovo, Kunyinsky District, Pskov Oblast, a village in Kunyinsky District
- Volkovo, Loknyansky District, Pskov Oblast, a village in Loknyansky District
- Volkovo, Novosokolnichesky District, Pskov Oblast, a village in Novosokolnichesky District
- Volkovo (Prigorodnaya Rural Settlement), Opochetsky District, Pskov Oblast, a village in Opochetsky District; municipally, a part of Prigorodnaya Rural Settlement of that district
- Volkovo (Varyginskaya Rural Settlement), Opochetsky District, Pskov Oblast, a village in Opochetsky District; municipally, a part of Varyginskaya Rural Settlement of that district
- Volkovo (Bolgatovskaya Rural Settlement), Opochetsky District, Pskov Oblast, a village in Opochetsky District; municipally, a part of Bolgatovskaya Rural Settlement of that district
- Volkovo (Zvonskaya Rural Settlement), Opochetsky District, Pskov Oblast, a village in Opochetsky District; municipally, a part of Zvonskaya Rural Settlement of that district
- Volkovo, Ostrovsky District, Pskov Oblast, a village in Ostrovsky District
- Volkovo (Cherskaya Rural Settlement), Palkinsky District, Pskov Oblast, a village in Palkinsky District; municipally, a part of Cherskaya Rural Settlement of that district
- Volkovo (Kachanovskaya Rural Settlement), Palkinsky District, Pskov Oblast, a village in Palkinsky District; municipally, a part of Kachanovskaya Rural Settlement of that district
- Volkovo, Pechorsky District, Pskov Oblast, a village in Pechorsky District
- Volkovo, Plyussky District, Pskov Oblast, a village in Plyussky District
- Volkovo (Karamyshevskaya Rural Settlement), Pskovsky District, Pskov Oblast, a village in Pskovsky District; municipally, a part of Karamyshevskaya Rural Settlement of that district
- Volkovo (Tyamshanskaya Rural Settlement), Pskovsky District, Pskov Oblast, a village in Pskovsky District; municipally, a part of Tyamshanskaya Rural Settlement of that district
- Volkovo, Pushkinogorsky District, Pskov Oblast, a village in Pushkinogorsky District
- Volkovo, Pustoshkinsky District, Pskov Oblast, a village in Pustoshkinsky District
- Volkovo, Pytalovsky District, Pskov Oblast, a village in Pytalovsky District
- Volkovo (Lychevskaya Rural Settlement), Velikoluksky District, Pskov Oblast, a village in Velikoluksky District; municipally, a part of Lychevskaya Rural Settlement of that district
- Volkovo (Maryinskaya Rural Settlement), Velikoluksky District, Pskov Oblast, a village in Velikoluksky District; municipally, a part of Maryinskaya Rural Settlement of that district

=== Ryazan Oblast ===
As of 2012, two rural localities in Ryazan Oblast bear this name:

- Volkovo, Kasimovsky District, Ryazan Oblast, a village in Ovchinnikovsky Rural Okrug of Kasimovsky District
- Volkovo, Ryazhsky District, Ryazan Oblast, a village in Marchukovsky 2 Rural Okrug of Ryazhsky District

=== Saratov Oblast ===
As of 2012, one rural locality in Saratov Oblast bears this name:

- Volkovo, Saratov Oblast, a selo in Marksovsky District

=== Smolensk Oblast ===
As of 2012, six rural localities in Smolensk Oblast bear this name:

- Volkovo, Dorogobuzhsky District, Smolensk Oblast, a village in Usvyatskoye Rural Settlement of Dorogobuzhsky District
- Volkovo, Dukhovshchinsky District, Smolensk Oblast, a village in Beresnevskoye Rural Settlement of Dukhovshchinsky District
- Volkovo, Krasninsky District, Smolensk Oblast, a village in Volkovskoye Rural Settlement of Krasninsky District
- Volkovo, Monastyrshchinsky District, Smolensk Oblast, a village in Sobolevskoye Rural Settlement of Monastyrshchinsky District
- Volkovo, Rudnyansky District, Smolensk Oblast, a village in Lyubavichskoye Rural Settlement of Rudnyansky District
- Volkovo, Yelninsky District, Smolensk Oblast, a village in Bobrovichskoye Rural Settlement of Yelninsky District

=== Sverdlovsk Oblast ===
As of 2012, two rural localities in Sverdlovsk Oblast bear this name:

- Volkovo, Artinsky District, Sverdlovsk Oblast, a village in Pristaninsky Selsoviet of Artinsky District
- Volkovo, Irbitsky District, Sverdlovsk Oblast, a selo in Berdyuginsky Selsoviet of Irbitsky District

=== Tambov Oblast ===
As of 2012, one rural locality in Tambov Oblast bears this name:

- Volkovo, Tambov Oblast, a village in Karaulsky Selsoviet of Inzhavinsky District

=== Republic of Tatarstan ===
As of 2012, one rural locality in the Republic of Tatarstan bears this name:

- Volkovo, Republic of Tatarstan, a selo in Agryzsky District

=== Tomsk Oblast ===
As of 2012, one rural locality in Tomsk Oblast bears this name:

- Volkovo, Tomsk Oblast, a village in Kolpashevsky District

=== Tula Oblast ===
As of 2012, two rural localities in Tula Oblast bear this name:

- Volkovo, Leninsky District, Tula Oblast, a village in Aleshinsky Rural Okrug of Leninsky District
- Volkovo, Uzlovsky District, Tula Oblast, a village in Lyutoricheskaya Rural Administration of Uzlovsky District

=== Tver Oblast ===
As of 2012, fourteen rural localities in Tver Oblast bear this name:

- Volkovo, Bezhetsky District, Tver Oblast, a village in Vasyukovskoye Rural Settlement of Bezhetsky District
- Volkovo, Bologovsky District, Tver Oblast, a village in Berezayskoye Rural Settlement of Bologovsky District
- Volkovo, Kashinsky District, Tver Oblast, a village in Davydovskoye Rural Settlement of Kashinsky District
- Volkovo, Molokovsky District, Tver Oblast, a village in Obrosovskoye Rural Settlement of Molokovsky District
- Volkovo, Glazkovskoye Rural Settlement, Oleninsky District, Tver Oblast, a village in Glazkovskoye Rural Settlement of Oleninsky District
- Volkovo, Gusevskoye Rural Settlement, Oleninsky District, Tver Oblast, a village in Gusevskoye Rural Settlement of Oleninsky District
- Volkovo, Kholmetskoye Rural Settlement, Oleninsky District, Tver Oblast, a village in Kholmetskoye Rural Settlement of Oleninsky District
- Volkovo, Molodotudskoye Rural Settlement, Oleninsky District, Tver Oblast, a village in Molodotudskoye Rural Settlement of Oleninsky District
- Volkovo, Rameshkovsky District, Tver Oblast, a village in Kushalino Rural Settlement of Rameshkovsky District
- Volkovo, Selizharovsky District, Tver Oblast, a village in Okovetskoye Rural Settlement of Selizharovsky District
- Volkovo, Stepurinskoye Rural Settlement, Staritsky District, Tver Oblast, a village in Stepurinskoye Rural Settlement of Staritsky District
- Volkovo, Stepurinskoye Rural Settlement, Staritsky District, Tver Oblast, a village in Stepurinskoye Rural Settlement of Staritsky District
- Volkovo, Vyshnevolotsky District, Tver Oblast, a village in Sorokinskoye Rural Settlement of Vyshnevolotsky District
- Volkovo, Zharkovsky District, Tver Oblast, a village in Shchucheyskoye Rural Settlement of Zharkovsky District

=== Vladimir Oblast ===
As of 2012, two rural localities in Vladimir Oblast bear this name:

- Volkovo, Petushinsky District, Vladimir Oblast, a village in Petushinsky District
- Volkovo, Sobinsky District, Vladimir Oblast, a village in Sobinsky District

=== Volgograd Oblast ===
As of 2012, one rural locality in Volgograd Oblast bears this name:

- Volkovo, Volgograd Oblast, a selo in Dubovsky Selsoviet of Yelansky District

=== Vologda Oblast ===
As of 2012, eleven rural localities in Vologda Oblast bear this name:

- Volkovo, Babayevsky District, Vologda Oblast, a village in Novolukinsky Selsoviet of Babayevsky District
- Volkovo, Belozersky District, Vologda Oblast, a village in Artyushinsky Selsoviet of Belozersky District
- Volkovo, Cherepovetsky District, Vologda Oblast, a village in Abakanovsky Selsoviet of Cherepovetsky District
- Volkovo, Frolovsky Selsoviet, Gryazovetsky District, Vologda Oblast, a village in Frolovsky Selsoviet of Gryazovetsky District
- Volkovo, Pertsevsky Selsoviet, Gryazovetsky District, Vologda Oblast, a village in Pertsevsky Selsoviet of Gryazovetsky District
- Volkovo, Kichmengsko-Gorodetsky District, Vologda Oblast, a village in Shongsky Selsoviet of Kichmengsko-Gorodetsky District
- Volkovo, Sheksninsky District, Vologda Oblast, a village in Domshinsky Selsoviet of Sheksninsky District
- Volkovo, Sokolsky District, Vologda Oblast, a village in Prigorodny Selsoviet of Sokolsky District
- Volkovo, Vashkinsky District, Vologda Oblast, a village in Kisnemsky Selsoviet of Vashkinsky District
- Volkovo, Podlesny Selsoviet, Vologodsky District, Vologda Oblast, a village in Podlesny Selsoviet of Vologodsky District
- Volkovo, Spassky Selsoviet, Vologodsky District, Vologda Oblast, a village in Spassky Selsoviet of Vologodsky District

=== Yaroslavl Oblast ===
As of 2012, eight rural localities in Yaroslavl Oblast bear this name:

- Volkovo, Bolsheselsky District, Yaroslavl Oblast, a village in Markovsky Rural Okrug of Bolsheselsky District
- Volkovo, Breytovsky District, Yaroslavl Oblast, a village in Sutkovsky Rural Okrug of Breytovsky District
- Volkovo, Danilovsky District, Yaroslavl Oblast, a village in Babayevsky Rural Okrug of Danilovsky District
- Volkovo, Nekouzsky District, Yaroslavl Oblast, a village in Latskovsky Rural Okrug of Nekouzsky District
- Volkovo, Makarovsky Rural Okrug, Rybinsky District, Yaroslavl Oblast, a village in Makarovsky Rural Okrug of Rybinsky District
- Volkovo, Ogarkovsky Rural Okrug, Rybinsky District, Yaroslavl Oblast, a village in Ogarkovsky Rural Okrug of Rybinsky District
- Volkovo, Tutayevsky District, Yaroslavl Oblast, a village in Chebakovsky Rural Okrug of Tutayevsky District
- Volkovo, Yaroslavsky District, Yaroslavl Oblast, a village in Teleginsky Rural Okrug of Yaroslavsky District

== Renamed localities ==
- Volkovo, name of Yuzhnaya, a village in Russko-Yurmashsky Selsoviet of Ufimsky District in the Republic of Bashkortostan, before March 2008

== Alternative names ==
- Volkovo, alternative name of Volkova, a village under the administrative jurisdiction of Karachev Urban Administrative Okrug in Karachevsky District of Bryansk Oblast; 53°3′N 34°55′E
- Volkovo, alternative name of Iki Chonos, a selo in Krasnomikhaylovskaya Rural Administration of Yashaltinsky District in the Republic of Kalmykia; 46°3′N 42°29′E
