= Rodniki =

Rodniki (Russian: Родники, Kazakh: Родники) is the name of several inhabited localities in Russia and one rural locality in Kazakhstan.

== Akmola Province (Kazakhstan) ==
Rodniki, Arshaly District, Akmola Province, a rural locality of Kazakhstan.

== Republic of Bashkortostan ==
As of 2012, three rural localities in the Republic of Bashkortostan bear this name:

- Rodniki, Belebeyevsky District, Republic of Bashkortostan, a village in Malinovsky Selsoviet of Belebeyevsky District
- Rodniki, Iglinsky District, Republic of Bashkortostan, a village in Ivano-Kazansky Selsoviet of Iglinsky District
- Rodniki, Kaltasinsky District, Republic of Bashkortostan, a village in Kelteyevsky Selsoviet of Kaltasinsky District

== Belgorod Oblast ==
As of 2012, one rural locality in Belgorod Oblast bears this name:

- Rodniki, Belgorod Oblast, a khutor in Veydelevsky District

== Bryansk Oblast ==
As of 2012, one rural locality in Bryansk Oblast bears this name:

- Rodniki, Bryansk Oblast, a settlement in Bolshezhukovsky Rural Administrative Okrug of Dyatkovsky District; 53°31′N 34°21′E

== Chelyabinsk Oblast ==
As of 2012, two rural localities in Chelyabinsk Oblast bear this name:

- Rodniki, Kartalinsky District, Chelyabinsk Oblast, a settlement in Annensky Selsoviet of Kartalinsky District
- Rodniki, Troitsky District, Chelyabinsk Oblast, a settlement in Rodnikovsky Selsoviet of Troitsky District

== Ivanovo Oblast ==
As of 2012, one urban locality in Ivanovo Oblast bears this name:

- Rodniki, Ivanovo Oblast, a town in Rodnikovsky District

== Kaliningrad Oblast ==
As of 2012, three rural localities in Kaliningrad Oblast bear this name:

- Rodniki, Guryevsky District, Kaliningrad Oblast, a settlement in Nizovsky Rural Okrug of Guryevsky District
- Rodniki, Pravdinsky District, Kaliningrad Oblast, a settlement under the administrative jurisdiction of the Town of District Significance of Pravdinsk in Pravdinsky District
- Rodniki, Zelenogradsky District, Kaliningrad Oblast, a settlement in Kovrovsky Rural Okrug of Zelenogradsky District

== Krasnodar Krai ==
As of 2012, one rural locality in Krasnodar Krai bears this name:

- Rodniki, Krasnodar Krai, a settlement in Rodnikovsky Rural Okrug of Belorechensky District

== Krasnoyarsk Krai ==
As of 2012, one rural locality in Krasnoyarsk Krai bears this name:

- Rodniki, Krasnoyarsk Krai, a selo in Rodnikovsky Selsoviet of Sharypovsky District

== Kurgan Oblast ==
As of 2012, one rural locality in Kurgan Oblast bears this name:

- Rodniki, Kurgan Oblast, a village in Starikovsky Selsoviet of Shumikhinsky District

== Moscow Oblast ==
As of 2012, two inhabited localities in Moscow Oblast bear this name:

Urban localities

- Rodniki, Ramensky District, Moscow Oblast, a suburban (dacha) settlement under the administrative jurisdiction of Rodniki Suburban Settlement in Ramensky District

Rural localities

- Rodniki, Serpukhovsky District, Moscow Oblast, a village in Dankovskoye Rural Settlement of Serpukhovsky District

== Novgorod Oblast ==
As of 2012, one rural locality in Novgorod Oblast bears this name:

- Rodniki, Novgorod Oblast, a village under the administrative jurisdiction of the Settlement of Lyubytinskoye in Lyubytinsky District

== Novosibirsk Oblast ==
As of 2012, one rural locality in Novosibirsk Oblast bears this name:

- Rodniki, Novosibirsk Oblast, a settlement in Toguchinsky District

== Orenburg Oblast ==
As of 2012, one rural locality in Orenburg Oblast bears this name:

- Rodniki, Orenburg Oblast, a village in Gavrilovsky Selsoviet of Saraktashsky District

== Penza Oblast ==
As of 2012, two rural localities in Penza Oblast bear this name:

- Rodniki, Luninsky District, Penza Oblast, a selo in Rodnikovsky Selsoviet of Luninsky District
- Rodniki, Nikolsky District, Penza Oblast, a settlement in Maissky Selsoviet of Nikolsky District

== Perm Krai ==
As of 2012, two rural localities in Perm Krai bear this name:

- Rodniki, Dobryanka, Perm Krai, a settlement under the administrative jurisdiction of the town of krai significance of Dobryanka
- Rodniki, Solikamsky District, Perm Krai, a selo in Solikamsky District

== Rostov Oblast ==
As of 2012, one rural locality in Rostov Oblast bears this name:

- Rodniki, Rostov Oblast, a khutor in Rodnikovskoye Rural Settlement of Kagalnitsky District

== Ryazan Oblast ==
As of 2012, one rural locality in Ryazan Oblast bears this name:

- Rodniki, Ryazan Oblast, a settlement in Protasyevo-Uglyansky Rural Okrug of Chuchkovsky District

== Stavropol Krai ==
As of 2012, one rural locality in Stavropol Krai bears this name:

- Rodniki, Stavropol Krai, a selo in Zolotarevsky Selsoviet of Ipatovsky District

== Sverdlovsk Oblast ==
As of 2012, one rural locality in Sverdlovsk Oblast bears this name:

- Rodniki, Sverdlovsk Oblast, a village in Artyomovsky District

== Republic of Tatarstan ==
As of 2012, one rural locality in the Republic of Tatarstan bears this name:

- Rodniki, Republic of Tatarstan, a selo in Alexeyevsky District

== Tver Oblast ==
As of 2012, one rural locality in Tver Oblast bears this name:

- Rodniki, Tver Oblast, a village in Moldinskoye Rural Settlement of Udomelsky District

== Udmurt Republic ==
As of 2012, one rural locality in the Udmurt Republic bears this name:

- Rodniki, Udmurt Republic, a village in Bulaysky Selsoviet of Uvinsky District

== Volgograd Oblast ==
As of 2012, one rural locality in Volgograd Oblast bears this name:

- Rodniki, Volgograd Oblast, a khutor in Strelnoshirokovsky Selsoviet of Dubovsky District

== Voronezh Oblast ==
As of 2012, two rural localities in Voronezh Oblast bear this name:

- Rodniki, Ostrogozhsky District, Voronezh Oblast, a khutor in Boldyrevskoye Rural Settlement of Ostrogozhsky District
- Rodniki, Repyovsky District, Voronezh Oblast, a khutor in Rossoshanskoye Rural Settlement of Repyovsky District

== Yaroslavl Oblast ==
As of 2012, one rural locality in Yaroslavl Oblast bears this name:

- Rodniki, Yaroslavl Oblast, a village in Pokrovsky Rural Okrug of Lyubimsky District
