= Ryzhkovo =

Ryzhkovo (Russian: Рыжково) is the name of several inhabited localities in Russia. It may refer to:

- Ryzhkovo, Kursk Oblast
- Ryzhkovo, Omsk Oblast
- Ryzhkovo, Perm Krai
- Ryzhkovo, Vladimir Oblast
- Ryzhkovo, Cherepovetsky District, Vologda Oblast
