= Orlyanka, Konyshyovsky District, Kursk Oblast =

Rural locality in Kursk Oblast, Russia

Orlyanka Орлянка
- Settlement
- Interactive map of Orlyanka
- Location of Orlyanka Orlyanka (Kursk Oblast)
- Coordinates: 51°57′49″N 35°28′15″E
- Country: Russia
- Federal subject: Kursk Oblast
- Administrative district: Konyshyovsky District
- SelsovietSelsoviet: Vablinsky

Population (2010 Census)
  - Total: 12
  - Estimate (2010): 12 (0%)

Municipal status
  - Municipal district: Konyshyovsky Municipal District
  - Rural settlement: Vablinsky Selsoviet Rural Settlement
- Time zone: UTC+3 (MSK)
- Postal code: 307606
- Dialing code: +7 47156
- OKTMO ID: 38616408131
- Website: www.vablinsky.ru

Orlyanka (Russian: Орлянка) is a rural locality (a settlement) in Vablinsky Selsoviet Rural Settlement, Konyshyovsky District, Kursk Oblast, Russia. Population: 12 (2010 census); 28 (2002 census);

== Geography ==
The settlement is located on the Vablya River (a tributary of the Prutishche in the basin of the Seym), 75 km from the Russia–Ukraine border, 56 km north-west of Kursk, 18 km north-west of the district center – the urban-type settlement Konyshyovka, 1.5 km from the selsoviet center – Vablya.

Climate

Orlyanka has a warm-summer humid continental climate (Dfb in the Köppen climate classification).

== Transport ==
Orlyanka is located 27.5 km from the federal route M-2 Crimea Highway, 13 km from the road of regional importance 38K-038 (Fatezh – Dmitriyev), 3.5 km from the road 38K-005 (Konyshyovka – Zhigayevo – 38K-038), 0.5 km from the road of intermunicipal significance 38H-142 (38K-005 – Ryzhkovo – Lukyanchikovo), 14 km from the nearest railway station Sokovninka (railway line Navlya – Lgov-Kiyevsky).

The rural locality is situated 61 km from Kursk Vostochny Airport, 165 km from Belgorod International Airport and 260 km from Voronezh Peter the Great Airport.
