= Rodinsky =

Rodinsky (Russian: Родинский; masculine), Rodinskaya (Родинская; feminine), or Rodinskoye (Родинское; neuter) is the name of several rural localities in Russia:

- Rodinsky, Republic of Bashkortostan, a village in Arkhangelsky District of the Republic of Bashkortostan
- Rodinsky, Orenburg Oblast, a settlement in Sorochinsky District of Orenburg Oblast
- Rodinskaya, a village in Zavolzhsky District of Ivanovo Oblast
- Rodinskoye, a selo in Yelansky District of Volgograd Oblast
