= Kiyevka =

Kiyevka Киевка
- Khutor
- Location within Volgograd Oblast Location within Russia
- Coordinates: 50°40′N 43°30′E
- Country: Russia
- Region: Volgograd Oblast
- District: Yelansky District
- Time zone: UTC+4:00

Kiyevka (Russian: Киевка) is a rural locality (a khutor) in Talovskoye Rural Settlement, Yelansky District, Volgograd Oblast, Russia. The population was 21 as of 2010. There is 1 street.

== Geography ==
Kiyevka is located on Khopyorsko-Buzulukskaya Plain, 9 km (5.6 mi) south of Yelan (the district's administrative centre) by road. Tersa is the nearest rural locality.
