= Vozhovo, Kursk Oblast =

Rural locality in Kursk Oblast, Russia

Vozhovo Вожово
- Village
- Interactive map of Vozhovo
- Location of Vozhovo Vozhovo (Kursk Oblast)
- Coordinates: 51°56′29″N 35°27′31″E
- Country: Russia
- Federal subject: Kursk Oblast
- Administrative district: Konyshyovsky District
- SelsovietSelsoviet: Vablinsky

Population (2010 Census)
  - Total: 29
  - Estimate (2010): 29 (0%)

Municipal status
  - Municipal district: Konyshyovsky Municipal District
  - Rural settlement: Vablinsky Selsoviet Rural Settlement
- Time zone: UTC+3 (MSK)
- Postal code: 307606
- Dialing code: +7 47156
- OKTMO ID: 38616408106
- Website: www.vablinsky.ru

Vozhovo (Russian: Вожово) is a rural locality (Russian: деревня, lit. 'village') in Vablinsky Selsoviet Rural Settlement, Konyshyovsky District, Kursk Oblast, Russia. Population: 29 (2010 census); 45 (2002 census);

== Geography ==
The village is located on the Vablya River (a tributary of the Prutishche in the basin of the Seym), 73 km from the Russia–Ukraine border, 55.5 km north-west of Kursk, 16 km north-west of the district center – the urban-type settlement Konyshyovka, 1.5 km from the selsoviet center – Vablya.

Climate

Vozhovo has a warm-summer humid continental climate (Dfb in the Köppen climate classification).

== Transport ==
Vozhovo is located 29 km from the federal route M-2 Crimea Highway, 15.5 km from the road of regional importance 38K-038 (Fatezh – Dmitriyev), 3.5 km from the road 38K-005 (Konyshyovka – Zhigayevo – 38K-038), 0.5 km from the road of intermunicipal significance 38H-142 (38K-005 – Ryzhkovo – Lukyanchikovo), 11 km from the nearest railway halt 552 km (railway line Navlya – Lgov-Kiyevsky).

The rural locality is situated 60 km from Kursk Vostochny Airport, 162 km from Belgorod International Airport and 260 km from Voronezh Peter the Great Airport.
