= Bolshoy Morets =

Bolshoy Morets Большой Морец
- Selo
- Location within Volgograd Oblast Location within Russia
- Coordinates: 50°54′N 43°52′E
- Country: Russia
- Region: Volgograd Oblast
- District: Yelansky District
- Time zone: UTC+4:00

Bolshoy Morets (Russian: Большой Морец) is a rural locality (a selo) and the administrative center of Bolshemoretskoye Rural Settlement, Yelansky District, Volgograd Oblast, Russia. The population was 1,438 as of 2010. There are 10 streets.

== Geography ==
Bolshoy Morets is located on Khopyorsko-Buzulukskaya Plain, 14 km southeast of Yelan (the district's administrative centre) by road. Tersa is the nearest rural locality.
