= Rovinsky =

Rovinsky Ровинский
- Khutor
- Location within Volgograd Oblast Location within Russia
- Coordinates: 50°48′N 43°26′E
- Country: Russia
- Region: Volgograd Oblast
- District: Yelansky District
- Time zone: UTC+4:00

Rovinsky (Russian: Ровинский) is a rural locality (a khutor) in Trostyanskoye Rural Settlement, Yelansky District, Volgograd Oblast, Russia. The population was 7 as of 2010.

== Geography ==
Rovinsky is located on Khopyorsko-Buzulukskaya Plain, on the left bank of the Buzuluk River, 29 km southwest of Yelan (the district's administrative centre) by road. Novobuzuluksky is the nearest rural locality.
