= Pervokamensky =

Pervokamensky Первокаменский
- Khutor
- Location within Volgograd Oblast Location within Russia
- Coordinates: 50°33′N 43°30′E
- Country: Russia
- Region: Volgograd Oblast
- District: Yelansky District
- Time zone: UTC+4:00

Pervokamensky (Russian: Первокаменский) is a rural locality (a khutor) in Talovskoye Rural Settlement, Yelansky District, Volgograd Oblast, Russia. The population was 148 as of 2010. There are 3 streets.

== Geography ==
Pervokamensky is located on Khopyorsko-Buzulukskaya Plain, on the bank of the Chyornaya River, 79 km southwest of Yelan (the district's administrative centre) by road. Talovka is the nearest rural locality.
