= Yereshkovo =

Yereshkovo Ерешково
- Selo
- Location within Volgograd Oblast Location within Russia
- Coordinates: 51°07′N 43°57′E
- Country: Russia
- Region: Volgograd Oblast
- District: Yelansky District
- Time zone: UTC+4:00

Yereshkovo (Russian: Ерешково) is a rural locality (a selo) in Beryozovskoye Rural Settlement, Yelansky District, Volgograd Oblast, Russia. The population was 47 as of 2010.

== Geography ==
Yereshkovo is located on Khopyorsko-Buzulukskaya Plain, on the Beryozovaya River, 29 km northeast of Yelan (the district's administrative centre) by road. Beryozovka is the nearest rural locality.
