= Khvoshchinka =

Khvoshchinka Хвощинка
- Khutor
- Location within Volgograd Oblast Location within Russia
- Coordinates: 51°04′N 44°10′E
- Country: Russia
- Region: Volgograd Oblast
- District: Yelansky District
- Time zone: UTC+4:00

Khvoshchinka (Russian: Хвощинка) is a rural locality (a khutor) in Moretskoye Rural Settlement, Yelansky District, Volgograd Oblast, Russia. The population was 258 as of 2010.

== Geography ==
Khvoshchinka is located on Khopyorsko-Buzulukskaya Plain, on the bank of the Vyazovka River, 40 km northeast of Yelan (the district's administrative centre) by road. Shchelokovka is the nearest rural locality.
