= Shchelokovka =

Shchelokovka Щелоковка
- Khutor
- Location within Volgograd Oblast Location within Russia
- Coordinates: 51°02′N 44°06′E
- Country: Russia
- Region: Volgograd Oblast
- District: Yelansky District
- Time zone: UTC+4:00

Shchelokovka (Russian: Щелоковка) is a rural locality (a khutor) in Moretskoye Rural Settlement, Yelansky District, Volgograd Oblast, Russia. The population was 132 as of 2010.

== Geography ==
Shchelokovka is located on Khopyorsko-Buzulukskaya Plain, on the left bank of the Vyazovka River, 35 km northeast of Yelan (the district's administrative centre) by road. Novodobrinka is the nearest rural locality.
