= Poruchikovsky =

Poruchikovsky Поручиковский
- Khutor
- Location within Volgograd Oblast Location within Russia
- Coordinates: 50°47′N 43°28′E
- Country: Russia
- Region: Volgograd Oblast
- District: Yelansky District
- Time zone: UTC+4:00

Poruchikovsky (Russian: Поручиковский) is a rural locality (a khutor) in Trostyanskoye Rural Settlement, Yelansky District, Volgograd Oblast, Russia. The population was 51 as of 2010.

== Geography ==
Poruchikovsky is located on Khopyorsko-Buzulukskaya Plain, on the left bank of the Buzuluk River, 32 km southwest of Yelan (the district's administrative centre) by road. Novobuzuluksky is the nearest rural locality.
