= Vodopyanovo =

Vodopyanovo Водопьяново
- Selo
- Location within Volgograd Oblast Location within Russia
- Coordinates: 51°02′N 43°52′E
- Country: Russia
- Region: Volgograd Oblast
- District: Yelansky District
- Time zone: UTC+4:00

Vodopyanovo (Russian: Водопьяново) is a rural locality (a selo) in Beryozovskoye Rural Settlement, Yelansky District, Volgograd Oblast, Russia. The population was 102 as of 2010. There are 5 streets.

== Geography ==
Vodopyanovo is located on Khopyorsko-Buzulukskaya Plain, on the Beryozovaya River, 17 km northeast of Yelan (the district's administrative centre) by road. Beryozovka is the nearest rural locality.
