= Ternovoye, Volgograd Oblast =

Ternovoye Терновое
- Selo
- Location within Volgograd Oblast Location within Russia
- Coordinates: 51°02′N 43°42′E
- Country: Russia
- Region: Volgograd Oblast
- District: Yelansky District
- Time zone: UTC+4:00

Ternovoye (Russian: Терновое) is a rural locality (a selo) and the administrative center of Ternovskoye Rural Settlement, Yelansky District, Volgograd Oblast, Russia. The population was 880 as of 2010. There are 11 streets.

== Geography ==
Ternovoye is located on Khopyorsko-Buzulukskaya Plain, on the left bank of the Tersa River, 18 km north of Yelan (the district's administrative centre) by road. Nabat is the nearest rural locality.
