= Talovka, Yelansky District, Volgograd Oblast =

Talovka Таловка
- Settlement
- Location within Volgograd Oblast Location within Russia
- Coordinates: 50°35′N 43°33′E
- Country: Russia
- Region: Volgograd Oblast
- District: Yelansky District
- Time zone: UTC+4:00

Talovka (Russian: Таловка) is a rural locality (a settlement) and the administrative center of Talovskoye Rural Settlement, Yelansky District, Volgograd Oblast, Russia. The population was 711 as of 2010. There are 10 streets.

== Geography ==
Talovka is located on Khopyorsko-Buzulukskaya Plain, on Mokraya Talovka River, 72 km southwest of Yelan (the district's administrative centre) by road. Pervokamensky is the nearest rural locality.
