= Khoshchininsky =

Khoshchininsky Хощининский
- Khutor
- Location within Volgograd Oblast Location within Russia
- Coordinates: 50°48′N 43°25′E
- Country: Russia
- Region: Volgograd Oblast
- District: Yelansky District
- Time zone: UTC+4:00

Khoshchininsky (Russian: Хощининский) is a rural locality (a khutor) in Trostyanskoye Rural Settlement, Yelansky District, Volgograd Oblast, Russia. The population was 1 as of 2010.

== Geography ==
Khoshchininsky is located on Khopyorsko-Buzulukskaya Plain, on the right bank of the Buzuluk River, 30 km southwest of Yelan (the district's administrative centre) by road. Rovinsky is the nearest rural locality.
