= Novopetrovsky, Yelansky District, Volgograd Oblast =

Novopetrovsky Новопетровский
- Khutor
- Location within Volgograd Oblast Location within Russia
- Coordinates: 50°40′N 43°50′E
- Country: Russia
- Region: Volgograd Oblast
- District: Yelansky District
- Time zone: UTC+4:00

Novopetrovsky (Russian: Новопетровский) is a rural locality (a khutor) in Bolshevistskoye Rural Settlement, Yelansky District, Volgograd Oblast, Russia. The population was 139 as of 2010.

== Geography ==
Novopetrovsky is located on Khopyorsko-Buzulukskaya Plain, 52 km southeast of Yelan (the district's administrative centre) by road. Zelyony is the nearest rural locality.
