= Bulgurino =

Bulgurino Булгурино
- Khutor
- Location within Volgograd Oblast Location within Russia
- Coordinates: 50°36′N 43°49′E
- Country: Russia
- Region: Volgograd Oblast
- District: Yelansky District
- Time zone: UTC+4:00

Bulgurino (Russian: Булгурино) is a rural locality (a khutor) in Bolshevistskoye Rural Settlement, Yelansky District, Volgograd Oblast, Russia. The population was 126 as of 2010.

== Geography ==
Bulgurino is located on Khopyorsko-Buzulukskaya Plain, on the left bank of the Buzuluk River, 59 km southeast of Yelan (the district's administrative centre) by road. Bolshevik is the nearest rural locality.
