= Alyavy =

Alyavy Алявы
- Khutor
- Location within Volgograd Oblast Location within Russia
- Coordinates: 50°45′N 43°44′E
- Country: Russia
- Region: Volgograd Oblast
- District: Yelansky District
- Time zone: UTC+4:00

Alyavy (Russian: Алявы) is a rural locality (a khutor) and the administrative center of Alyavskoye Rural Settlement, Yelansky District, Volgograd Oblast, Russia. The population was 259 as of 2010.

== Geography ==
Alyavy is located on Khopyorsko-Buzulukskaya Plain, 48 km south of Yelan (the district's administrative centre) by road. Zelyony is the nearest rural locality.
