= Vyazovka, Yelansky District, Volgograd Oblast =

Vyazovka Вязовка
- Selo
- Location within Volgograd Oblast Location within Russia
- Coordinates: 50°53′N 43°56′E
- Country: Russia
- Region: Volgograd Oblast
- District: Yelansky District
- Time zone: UTC+4:00

Vyazovka (Russian: Вязо́вка) is a rural locality (a selo) and the administrative center of Vayzovskoye Rural Settlement, Yelansky District, Volgograd Oblast, Russia. The population was 2,732 as of 2010. There are 29 streets.

== Geography ==
Vyazovka is located on the Vyazovka River, 22 km southeast of Yelan (the district's administrative centre) by road. Beryozovka is the nearest rural locality.
