= Babinkino =

Babinkino Бабинкино
- Selo
- Location within Volgograd Oblast Location within Russia
- Coordinates: 51°00′N 43°33′E
- Country: Russia
- Region: Volgograd Oblast
- District: Yelansky District
- Time zone: UTC+4:00

Babinkino (Russian: Бабинкино) is a rural locality (a selo) in Dubovskoye Rural Settlement, Yelansky District, Volgograd Oblast, Russia. The population was 214 as of 2010. There are 8 streets.

== Geography ==
Babinkino is located on Khopyorsko-Buzulukskaya Plain, on the Yelan River, 26 km northwest of Yelan (the district's administrative centre) by road. Toryanoye is the nearest rural locality.
