= Zelyony, Yelansky District, Volgograd Oblast =

Zelyony Зелёный
- Khutor
- Location within Volgograd Oblast Location within Russia
- Coordinates: 50°44′N 43°48′E
- Country: Russia
- Region: Volgograd Oblast
- District: Yelansky District
- Time zone: UTC+4:00

Zelyony (Russian: Зелёный) is a rural locality (a khutor) in Zhuravskoye Rural Settlement, Yelansky District, Volgograd Oblast, Russia. The population was 122 as of 2010.

== Geography ==
Zelyony is located on Khopyorsko-Buzulukskaya Plain, on the bank of the Yelan River, 43 km southeast of Yelan (the district's administrative centre) by road. Alyavy is the nearest rural locality.
