= Kalachiki =

Kalachiki Калачики
- Khutor
- Location within Volgograd Oblast Location within Russia
- Coordinates: 50°35′N 43°42′E
- Country: Russia
- Region: Volgograd Oblast
- District: Yelansky District
- Time zone: UTC+4:00

Kalachiki (Russian: Калачики) is a rural locality (a khutor) in Bolshevistskoye Rural Settlement, Yelansky District, Volgograd Oblast, Russia. The population was 86 as of 2010.

== Geography ==
Kalachiki is located on Khopyorsko-Buzulukskaya Plain, 62 km south of Yelan (the district's administrative centre) by road. Bolshevik is the nearest rural locality.
