= Rodinskoye =

Rodinskoye Родинское
- Selo
- Location within Volgograd Oblast Location within Russia
- Coordinates: 50°54′N 43°23′E
- Country: Russia
- Region: Volgograd Oblast
- District: Yelansky District
- Time zone: UTC+4:00

Rodinskoye (Russian: Родинское) is a rural locality (a selo) and the administrative center of Rodinskoye Rural Settlement, Yelansky District, Volgograd Oblast, Russia. The population was 292 as of 2010. There are 6 streets.

== Geography ==
Rodinskoye is located on Khopyorsko-Buzulukskaya Plain, on the left bank of the Odaryushka River, 33 km southwest of Yelan (the district's administrative centre) by road. Kalinovsky is the nearest rural locality.
