= Tokarevka, Russia =

Tokarevka (Russian: Токаревка) or Tokaryovka (Russian: Токарёвка) is the name of several inhabited localities in Russia.

== Urban localities ==
- Tokaryovka, Tambov Oblast, a work settlement under the administrative jurisdiction of Tokaryovsky Settlement Council, Tokaryovsky District, Tambov Oblast

== Rural localities ==
- Tokarevka, Kaliningrad Oblast, a settlement in Chistoprudnensky Rural Okrug of Nesterovsky District of Kaliningrad Oblast
- Tokarevka, Novosibirsk Oblast, a village in Karasuksky District of Novosibirsk Oblast
- Tokarevka, Penza Oblast, a village in Ulyanovsky Selsoviet of Tamalinsky District of Penza Oblast
