= Volkovo, Volgograd Oblast =

Volkovo Волково
- Selo
- Location within Volgograd Oblast Location within Russia
- Coordinates: 50°59′N 43°34′E
- Country: Russia
- Region: Volgograd Oblast
- District: Yelansky District
- Time zone: UTC+4:00

Volkovo (Russian: Волково) is a rural locality (a selo) in Dubovskoye Rural Settlement, Yelansky District, Volgograd Oblast, Russia. The population was 287 as of 2010. There are 8 streets.

== Geography ==
Volkovo is located on Khopyorsko-Buzulukskaya Plain, on the bank of the Yelan River, 15 km northwest of Yelan (the district's administrative centre) by road. Babinkino is the nearest rural locality.
