= Tokarevka =

Tokarevka or Tokaryovka may refer to:

- Tokarevka, Kazakhstan, an inhabited locality in Kazakhstan
- Tokarevka, Russia (Tokaryovka), name of several inhabited localities in Russia
