= Rassvet =

Rassvet may refer to:

== Places ==
- Rassvet, a village administered by the town of Bucovăț, Moldova
- Rassvet, Russia, several rural localities in Russia

== Aerospace ==
- Rassvet (ISS module), a component of the International Space Station
- Rassvet, a communication system on the Soyuz spacecraft
- Rassvet (satellite constellation), a satellite communications constellation operated by Russian company Bureau 1440

== Other uses ==
- "Rassvet", an episode of TV show The Blacklist season 6
- Dawn (Russia) (Russian: Рассвет, romanized: Rassvet), a political party in Russia
