= Tersa =

Tersa Терса
- Village
- Location within Volgograd Oblast Location within Russia
- Coordinates: 50°53′N 43°47′E
- Country: Russia
- Region: Volgograd Oblast
- District: Yelansky District
- Time zone: UTC+4:00

Tersa (Russian: Терса) is a village and administrative center in Tersinskoye Rural Settlement, Yelansky District, Volgograd Oblast, Russia.
