= Vesyolaya Roshcha =

Vesyolaya Roshcha Весёлая Роща
- Village
- Location within Bashkortostan Location within Russia
- Coordinates: 54°03′N 54°05′E
- Country: Russia
- Region: Bashkortostan
- District: Belebeyevsky District
- Time zone: UTC+5:00

Vesyolaya Roshcha (Russian: Весёлая Роща) is a rural locality (a village) in Malinovsky Selsoviet, Belebeyevsky District, Bashkortostan, Russia. The population was 73 as of 2010. There are 3 streets.

== Geography ==
Vesyolaya Roshcha is located 8 km southwest of Belebey (the district's administrative centre) by road. Svoboda is the nearest rural locality.
