= Rassvet, Belebeyevsky District, Republic of Bashkortostan =

Rassvet Рассвет
- Village
- Location within Bashkortostan Location within Russia
- Coordinates: 54°02′N 53°59′E
- Country: Russia
- Region: Bashkortostan
- District: Belebeyevsky District
- Time zone: UTC+5:00

Rassvet (Russian: Рассвет) is a rural locality (a village) in Rassvetovsky Selsoviet, Belebeyevsky District, Bashkortostan, Russia. The population was 277 as of 2010. There are 11 streets.

== Geography ==
Rassvet is located 15 km southwest of Belebey (the district's administrative centre) by road. Rodniki is the nearest rural locality.
