= Volkovo, Sheksninsky District, Vologda Oblast =

Volkovo Волково
- Village
- Location within Vologda Oblast Location within Russia
- Coordinates: 59°09′N 39°03′E
- Country: Russia
- Region: Vologda Oblast
- District: Sheksninsky District
- Time zone: UTC+3:00

Volkovo (Russian: Волково) is a rural locality (a village) in Domshinskoye Rural Settlement, Sheksninsky District, Vologda Oblast, Russia. The population was 33 as of 2002.

== Geography ==
Volkovo is located 42 km southeast of Sheksna (the district's administrative centre) by road. Gubino is the nearest rural locality.
