= Rassvet, Meleuzovsky District, Republic of Bashkortostan =

Rassvet Рассвет
- Village
- Location within Bashkortostan Location within Russia
- Coordinates: 52°55′N 55°52′E
- Country: Russia
- Region: Bashkortostan
- District: Meleuzovsky District
- Time zone: UTC+5:00

Rassvet (Russian: Рассвет) is a rural locality (a village) in Meleuzovsky Selsoviet, Meleuzovsky District, Bashkortostan, Russia. The population was 214 as of 2010. There are 3 streets.

== Geography ==
Rassvet is located 7 km southwest of Meleuz (the district's administrative centre) by road. Yumaguzino is the nearest rural locality.
