= Rodinsky, Republic of Bashkortostan =

Rodinsky Родинский
- Village
- Location within Bashkortostan Location within Russia
- Coordinates: 54°25′N 57°03′E
- Country: Russia
- Region: Bashkortostan
- District: Arkhangelsky District
- Time zone: UTC+5:00

Rodinsky (Russian: Родинский) is a rural locality (a village) in Bakaldinsky Selsoviet, Arkhangelsky District, Bashkortostan, Russia. The population was 81 as of 2010. There are 2 streets.

== Geography ==
Rodinsky is located 22 km east of Arkhangelskoye (the district's administrative centre) by road. Kizgi is the nearest rural locality.
