= Rassvet, Miyakinsky District, Republic of Bashkortostan =

Rassvet Рассвет
- Village
- Location within Bashkortostan Location within Russia
- Coordinates: 53°44′N 54°50′E
- Country: Russia
- Region: Bashkortostan
- District: Miyakinsky District
- Time zone: UTC+5:00

Rassvet (Russian: Рассвет) is a rural locality (a village) in Bikkulovsky Selsoviet, Miyakinsky District, Bashkortostan, Russia. The population was 304 as of 2010. There are 8 streets.

== Geography ==
Rassvet is located 22 km north of Kirgiz-Miyaki (the district's administrative centre) by road. Bikkulovo is the nearest rural locality.
