= Rassvet, Republic of Dagestan =

Rassvet Рассвет
- Selo
- Location within Republic of Dagestan Location within Russia
- Coordinates: 43°58′N 46°42′E
- Country: Russia
- Region: Republic of Dagestan
- District: Tarumovsky District
- Time zone: UTC+3:00

Rassvet (Russian: Рассвет) is a rural locality (a selo) and the administrative center of Ullubiyevsky Selsoviet, Tarumovsky District, Republic of Dagestan, Russia. Population: 1,216 (2010 census); 1,038 (2002 census); 463 (1989 Soviet census). There are 4 streets.

== Geography ==
Rassvet is located 22 km southeast of Tarumovka (the district's administrative centre) by road. Komsomolsky is the nearest rural locality.
