= Rodniki, Solikamsky District, Perm Krai =

Rodniki Родники
- Selo
- Location within Perm Krai Location within Russia
- Coordinates: 59°33′N 56°44′E
- Country: Russia
- Region: Perm Krai
- District: Solikamsky District
- Time zone: UTC+5:00

Rodniki (Russian: Родники) is a rural locality (a selo) and the administrative center of Rodnikovskoye Rural Settlement, Solikamsky District, Perm Krai, Russia. The population was 1,689 as of 2010. There are 28 streets.
