= Volkovo, Vichugsky District, Ivanovo Oblast =

Volkovo Волково
- Village
- Location within Ivanovo Oblast Location within Russia
- Coordinates: 57°16′N 41°52′E
- Country: Russia
- Region: Ivanovo Oblast
- District: Vichugsky District
- Time zone: UTC+3:00

Volkovo (Russian: Волково) is a rural locality (a village) in Vichugsky District, Ivanovo Oblast, Russia. Population: 166 (2010 census);
