= Rassvet, Ilovlinsky District, Volgograd Oblast =

Rassvet Рассвет
- Settlement
- Location within Volgograd Oblast Location within Russia
- Coordinates: 49°19′N 44°14′E
- Country: Russia
- Region: Volgograd Oblast
- District: Ilovlinsky District
- Time zone: UTC+4:00

Rassvet (Russian: Рассвет) is a rural locality (a settlement) in Medvedevskoye Rural Settlement, Ilovlinsky District, Volgograd Oblast, Russia. The population was 65 as of 2010.

== Geography ==
Rassvet is located 48 km east of Ilovlya (the district's administrative centre) by road. Medvedev is the nearest rural locality.
