= Rassvet, Buzdyaksky District, Republic of Bashkortostan =

Rassvet Рассвет
- Selo
- Location within Bashkortostan Location within Russia
- Coordinates: 54°28′N 54°45′E
- Country: Russia
- Region: Bashkortostan
- District: Buzdyaksky District
- Time zone: UTC+5:00

Rassvet (Russian: Рассвет) is a rural locality (selo) in Gafuriysky Selsoviet, Buzdyaksky District, Bashkortostan, Russia. The population was 265 as of 2010. There are 4 streets.

== Geography ==
Rassvet is located 11 km north of Buzdyak (the district's administrative centre) by road.
