= Rassvet, Khabarsky District, Altai Krai =

Rassvet Рассвет
- Settlement
- Location within Altai Krai Location within Russia
- Coordinates: 53°30′N 79°19′E
- Country: Russia
- Region: Altai Krai
- District: Khabarsky District
- Time zone: UTC+7:00

Rassvet (Russian: Рассвет) is a rural locality (a settlement) in Martovsky Selsoviet, Khabarsky District, Altai Krai, Russia. The population was 285 as of 2013. There are 4 streets.

== Geography ==
Rassvet is located 23 km southwest of Khabary (the district's administrative centre) by road. Novoilyinka is the nearest rural locality.
