= Rassvet, Leninsky District, Volgograd Oblast =

Rassvet Рассвет
- Settlement
- Location within Volgograd Oblast Location within Russia
- Coordinates: 49°06′N 45°28′E
- Country: Russia
- Region: Volgograd Oblast
- District: Leninsky District
- Time zone: UTC+4:00

Rassvet (Russian: Рассвет) is a rural locality (a settlement) and the administrative center of Rassvetenskoye Rural Settlement, Leninsky District, Volgograd Oblast, Russia. The population was 684 as of 2010. There are 11 streets.

== Geography ==
The village is located on Caspian Depression, on the left bank of the Volga River, 96 km from Volgograd, 62 km from Leninsk.
