= Rassvet, Romanovsky District, Altai Krai =

Rassvet Рассвет
- Settlement
- Location within Altai Krai Location within Russia
- Coordinates: 52°44′N 81°26′E
- Country: Russia
- Region: Altai Krai
- District: Romanovsky District
- Time zone: UTC+7:00

Rassvet (Russian: Рассвет) is a rural locality (a settlement) and the administrative center of Rassvetovsky Selsoviet of Romanovsky District, Altai Krai, Russia. The population was 288 in 2016. There are 6 streets.

== Geography ==
Rassvet is located 31 km northeast of Romanovo (the district's administrative centre) by road. Maysky is the nearest rural locality.
