= Rodniki, Iglinsky District, Republic of Bashkortostan =

Rodniki Родники
- Village
- Location within Bashkortostan Location within Russia
- Coordinates: 54°32′N 56°27′E
- Country: Russia
- Region: Bashkortostan
- District: Iglinsky District
- Time zone: UTC+5:00

Rodniki (Russian: Родники) is a rural locality (a village) in Ivano-Kazansky Selsoviet, Iglinsky District, Bashkortostan, Russia. The population was 84 as of 2010. There are 2 streets.

== Geography ==
Rodniki is located 37 km south of Iglino (the district's administrative centre) by road. Slutka is the nearest rural locality.
