= Ryzhkovo, Perm Krai =

Ryzhkovo Рыжково
- Village
- Location within Perm Krai Location within Russia
- Coordinates: 57°33′N 57°12′E
- Country: Russia
- Region: Perm Krai
- District: Beryozovsky District
- Time zone: UTC+5:00

Ryzhkovo (Russian: Рыжково) is a rural locality (a village) in Zaboryinskoye Rural Settlement, Beryozovsky District, Perm Krai, Russia. The population was 102 as of 2010.

== Geography ==
Ryzhkovo is located on the Shakva River, 12 km southwest of Beryozovka (the district's administrative centre) by road. Issinyayevo is the nearest rural locality.
