= Rodniki, Belebeyevsky District, Republic of Bashkortostan =

Rodniki Родники
- Village
- Rodniki from the air

- Location within Bashkortostan Location within Russia
- Coordinates: 54°04′N 54°02′E
- Country: Russia
- Region: Bashkortostan
- District: Belebeyevsky District
- Time zone: UTC+5:00

Rodniki (Russian: Родники) is a rural locality (a village) in Malinovsky Selsoviet, Belebeyevsky District, Bashkortostan, Russia. The population was 259 as of 2010. There are 9 streets.

== Geography ==
Rodniki is located 7 km southwest of Belebey (the district's administrative centre) by road. Svoboda is the nearest rural locality.
