= Ryzhkovo, Vladimir Oblast =

Ryzhkovo Рыжково
- Village
- Location within Vladimir Oblast Location within Russia
- Coordinates: 56°09′N 40°03′E
- Country: Russia
- Region: Vladimir Oblast
- District: Sobinsky District
- Time zone: UTC+3:00

Ryzhkovo (Russian: Рыжково) is a rural locality (a village) in Tolpukhovskoye Rural Settlement, Sobinsky District, Vladimir Oblast, Russia. The population was 24 as of 2010. There are 9 streets.

== Geography ==
Ryzhkovo is located 24 km north of Sobinka (the district's administrative centre) by road. Tolpukhovo is the nearest rural locality.
