= Volkovo, Lezhnevsky District, Ivanovo Oblast =

Volkovo Волково
- Village
- Location within Ivanovo Oblast Location within Russia
- Coordinates: 56°43′N 40°56′E
- Country: Russia
- Region: Ivanovo Oblast
- District: Lezhnevsky District
- Time zone: UTC+3:00

Volkovo (Russian: Волково) is a rural locality (a village) in Lezhnevsky District, Ivanovo Oblast, Russia. Population: 11 (2010 census);

== Geography ==
This rural locality is located 6 kilometres (3.7 mi) from Lezhnevo (the district's administrative centre), 30 kilometres (19 mi) from Ivanovo (capital of Ivanovo Oblast) and 229 kilometres (142 mi) from Moscow. Bykovka is the nearest rural locality.
