= Rodniki, Kaltasinsky District, Republic of Bashkortostan =

Rodniki Родники
- Village
- Location within Bashkortostan Location within Russia
- Coordinates: 55°56′N 54°34′E
- Country: Russia
- Region: Bashkortostan
- District: Kaltasinsky District
- Time zone: UTC+5:00

Rodniki (Russian: Родники) is a rural locality (a village) in Kelteyevsky Selsoviet, Kaltasinsky District, Bashkortostan, Russia. The population was 17 as of 2010. There is 1 street.

== Geography ==
Rodniki is located 17 km west of Kaltasy (the district's administrative centre) by road.
