= Volkovo, Amur Oblast =

Volkovo Волково
- Selo
- Location within Amur Oblast Location within Russia
- Coordinates: 50°14′N 127°46′E
- Country: Russia
- Region: Amur Oblast
- District: Blagoveshchensky District
- Time zone: UTC+9:00

Volkovo (Russian: Волково) is a rural locality (a selo) and the administrative center of Volkovsky Selsoviet of Blagoveshchensky District, Amur Oblast, Russia. The population was 2,075 as of 2018. There are 36 streets.

== Geography ==
Volkovo is located 23 km east of Blagoveshchensk (the district's administrative centre) by road. Rovnoye is the nearest rural locality.
