= Svoboda, Belebeyevsky District, Republic of Bashkortostan =

Svoboda Свобода
- Village
- Location within Bashkortostan Location within Russia
- Coordinates: 54°03′N 54°04′E
- Country: Russia
- Region: Bashkortostan
- District: Belebeyevsky District
- Time zone: UTC+5:00

Svoboda (Russian: Свобода) is a rural locality (a village) in Malinovsky Selsoviet, Belebeyevsky District, Bashkortostan, Russia. The population was 48 as of 2010. There are 2 streets.

== Geography ==
Svoboda is located 7 km southwest of Belebey (the district's administrative centre) by road. Vesyolaya Roshcha is the nearest rural locality.
