= Rodniki, Volgograd Oblast =

Rodniki Родники
- Khutor
- Location within Volgograd Oblast Location within Russia
- Coordinates: 49°18′N 44°55′E
- Country: Russia
- Region: Volgograd Oblast
- District: Dubovsky District
- Time zone: UTC+4:00

Rodniki (Russian: Родники) is a rural locality (a khutor) in Strelnoshirokovskoye Rural Settlement, Dubovsky District, Volgograd Oblast, Russia. The population was 156 as of 2010. There are four streets.

== Geography ==
Rodniki is located on the right bank of the Volga River, 34 km northwest of Dubovka (the district's administrative centre) by road. Davydovka is the nearest rural locality.
