= Rodniki, Dobryanka, Perm Krai =

Rodniki Родники
- Settlement
- Location within Perm Krai Location within Russia
- Coordinates: 58°29′N 56°45′E
- Country: Russia
- Region: Perm Krai
- District: Dobryansky District
- Time zone: UTC+5:00

Rodniki (Russian: Родники) is a rural locality (a settlement) in Dobryansky District, Perm Krai, Russia. The population was 3 as of 2010. There are 2 streets.
