= Volkovo, Petushinsky District, Vladimir Oblast =

Volkovo Волково
- Village
- Location within Vladimir Oblast Location within Russia
- Coordinates: 56°02′N 39°41′E
- Country: Russia
- Region: Vladimir Oblast
- District: Petushinsky District
- Time zone: UTC+3:00

Volkovo (Russian: Волково) is a rural locality (a village) in Pekshinskoye Rural Settlement, Petushinsky District, Vladimir Oblast, Russia. The population was 9 as of 2010.

== Geography ==
Volkovo is located on the Nergel River, 33 km northeast of Petushki (the district's administrative centre) by road. Podvyaznovo is the nearest rural locality.
