= Volkovo, Cherkassky Selsoviet, Ufimsky District, Republic of Bashkortostan =

Volkovo Волково
- Village
- Location within Bashkortostan Location within Russia
- Coordinates: 54°54′N 56°17′E
- Country: Russia
- Region: Bashkortostan
- District: Ufimsky District
- Time zone: UTC+5:00

Volkovo (Russian: Волково) is a rural locality (a village) in Cherkassky Selsoviet, Ufimsky District, Bashkortostan, Russia. The population was 26 as of 2010.

== Geography ==
It is located 35 km from Ufa, 8 km from Cherkassy.
