= Rassvet, Astrakhan Oblast =

Rassvet Рассвет
- Selo
- Location within Astrakhan Oblast Location within Russia
- Coordinates: 46°33′N 47°57′E
- Country: Russia
- Region: Astrakhan Oblast
- District: Narimanovsky District
- Time zone: UTC+4:00

Rassvet (Russian: Рассвет) is a rural locality (a selo) and the administrative center of Rassvetsky Selsoviet, Narimanovsky District, Astrakhan Oblast, Russia. The population was 1,338 as of 2010. There are 39 streets.

== Geography ==
Rassvet is located 22 km south of Narimanov (the district's administrative centre) by road. Tinaki 2-ye is the nearest rural locality.
