= Volkovo, Aurgazinsky District, Republic of Bashkortostan =

Volkovo Волково
- Village
- Location within Bashkortostan Location within Russia
- Coordinates: 54°12′N 55°41′E
- Country: Russia
- Region: Bashkortostan
- District: Aurgazinsky District
- Time zone: UTC+5:00

Volkovo (Russian: Волково) is a rural locality (a village) in Tukayevsky Selsoviet, Aurgazinsky District, Bashkortostan, Russia. The population was 11 as of 2010. There is 1 street.

== Geography ==
Volkovo is located 40 km northwest of Tolbazy (the district's administrative centre) by road. Tyubyakovo is the nearest rural locality.
