= Volkovo, Blagoveshchensky District, Republic of Bashkortostan =

Volkovo Волково
- Selo
- Location within Bashkortostan Location within Russia
- Coordinates: 55°10′N 56°21′E
- Country: Russia
- Region: Bashkortostan
- District: Blagoveshchensky District
- Time zone: UTC+5:00

Volkovo (Russian: Волково) is a rural locality (a selo) and the administrative centre of Volkovsky Selsoviet, Blagoveshchensky District, Bashkortostan, Russia. The population was 218 as of 2010. There are 2 streets.

== Geography ==
Volkovo is located 41 km northeast of Blagoveshchensk (the district's administrative centre) by road. Kuliki is the nearest rural locality.
