= Rassvet, Iglinsky District, Republic of Bashkortostan =

Rassvet Рассвет
- Village
- Location within Bashkortostan Location within Russia
- Coordinates: 54°57′N 57°06′E
- Country: Russia
- Region: Bashkortostan
- District: Iglinsky District
- Time zone: UTC+5:00

Rassvet (Russian: Рассвет) is a rural locality (a village) in Krasnovoskhodsky Selsoviet, Iglinsky District, Bashkortostan, Russia. The population was 14 as of 2010. There is 1 street.

== Geography ==
Rassvet is located 70 km northeast of Iglino (the district's administrative centre) by road.
