= Rassvet, Vladimir Oblast =

Rassvet Рассвет
- Village
- Location within Vladimir Oblast Location within Russia
- Coordinates: 55°56′N 42°20′E
- Country: Russia
- Region: Vladimir Oblast
- District: Gorokhovetsky District
- Time zone: UTC+3:00

Rassvet (Russian: Рассвет) is a rural locality (a village) in Fominskoye Rural Settlement, Gorokhovetsky District, Vladimir Oblast, Russia. The population was 43 as of 2010.

== Geography ==
Rassvet is located 42 km southwest of Gorokhovets (the district's administrative centre) by road. Rebrovo is the nearest rural locality.
