= Rassvet, Davlekanovsky District, Republic of Bashkortostan =

Rassvet Рассвет
- Selo
- Location within Bashkortostan Location within Russia
- Coordinates: 54°17′N 54°57′E
- Country: Russia
- Region: Bashkortostan
- District: Davlekanovsky District
- Time zone: UTC+5:00

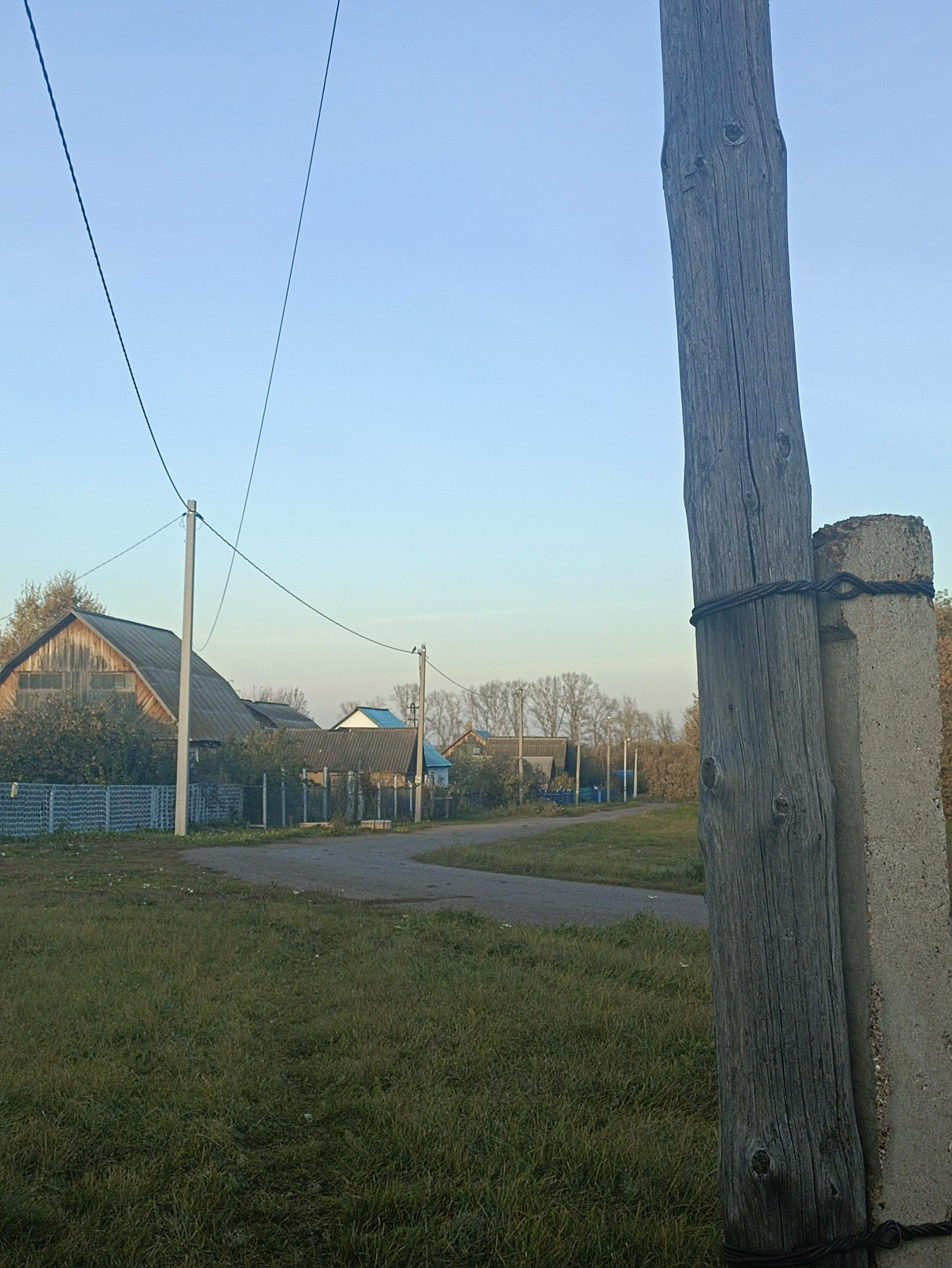
Rassvet

Rassvet (Russian: Рассвет) is a rural locality (a selo) and the administrative centre of Rassvetovsky Selsoviet, Davlekanovsky District, Bashkortostan, Russia. The population was 390 as of 2010. There are 6 streets.

== Geography ==
Rassvet is located 15 km northwest of Davlekanovo (the district's administrative centre) by road. Olgovka is the nearest rural locality.
