= Rassvet, Kotelnikovsky District, Volgograd Oblast =

Rassvet Рассвет
- Settlement
- Location within Volgograd Oblast Location within Russia
- Coordinates: 47°33′N 43°26′E
- Country: Russia
- Region: Volgograd Oblast
- District: Kotelnikovsky District
- Time zone: UTC+4:00

Rassvet (Russian: Рассвет) is a rural locality (a settlement) in Poperechenskoye Rural Settlement, Kotelnikovsky District, Volgograd Oblast, Russia. The population was 203 as of 2010. There are 2 streets.

== Geography ==
Rassvet is located in steppe, 29 km southeast of Kotelnikovo (the district's administrative centre) by road. Poperechny is the nearest rural locality.
