= Tokaryovka, Tambov Oblast =

Tokaryovka Токарёвка
- Urban-type settlement
- Interactive map of Tokaryovka
- Location of Tokaryovka Tokaryovka (Tambov Oblast)
- Coordinates: 51.9937°N 41.1623°E
- Country: Russia
- Federal subject: Tambov Oblast
- Administrative district: Tokaryovsky District

Population (2010 Census)
  - Total: 6,929
  - Estimate (2021): 6,420 (−7.3%)
- Time zone: UTC+3 (MSK)
- Postal code: 393550
- OKTMO ID: 68642151051

Tokaryovka (Russian: Токарёвка) is an urban locality (an urban-type settlement) in Tokaryovsky District of Tambov Oblast, Russia. Population: 6,929 (2010 census); 7,441 (2002 census); 8,111 (1989 Soviet census).
