= Tokaryovsky District =

Tokaryovsky District Токарёвский район (Russian)
- District
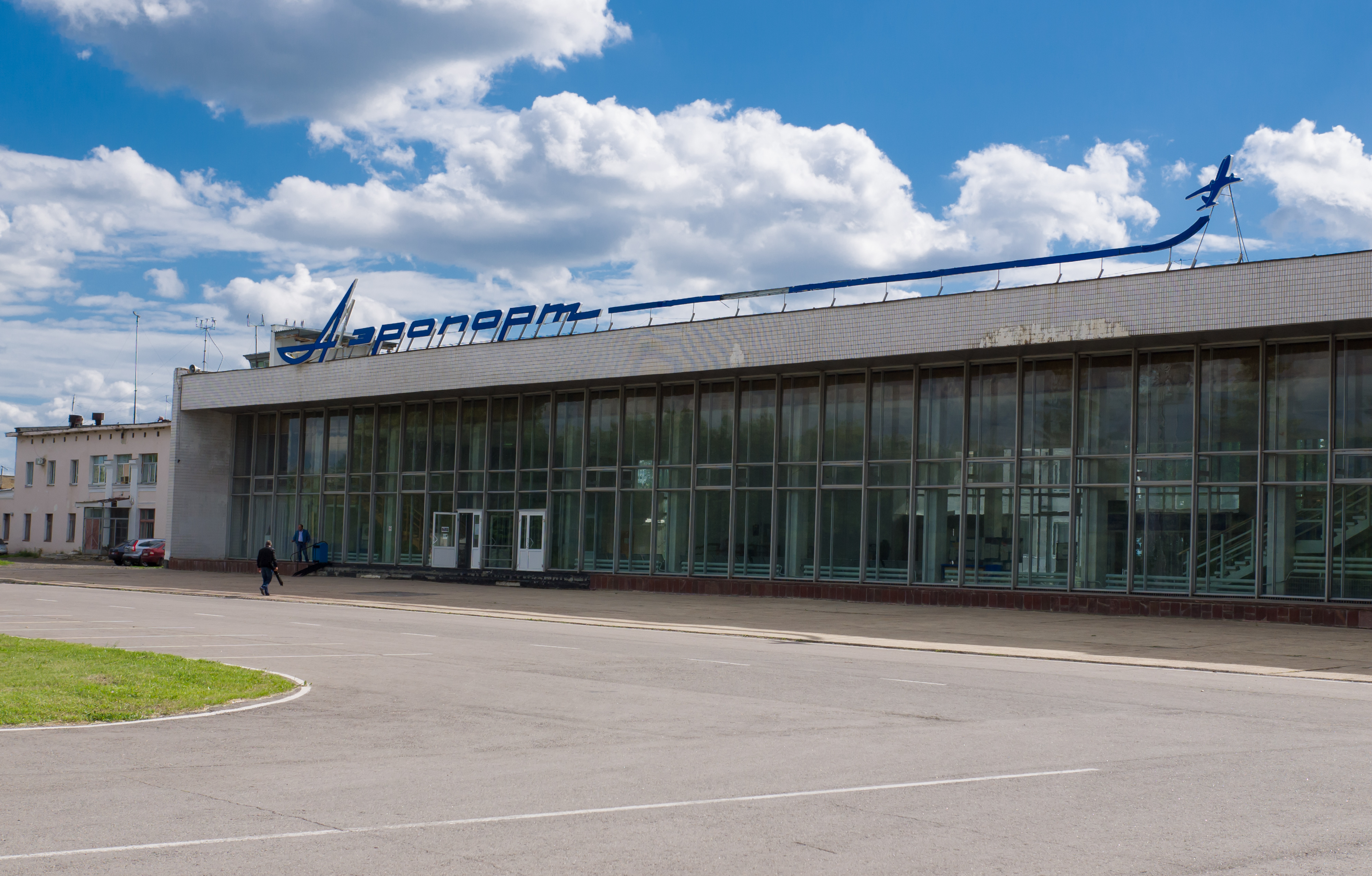
- Don Airport, Tokaryovsky District

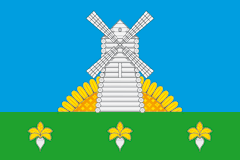
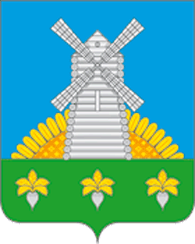
- Flag Coat of arms
- Location of Tokaryovsky District in Tambov Oblast
- Coordinates: 52°00′N 41°10′E
- Country: Russia
- Federal subject: Tambov Oblast
- Established: 1928
- Administrative center: Tokaryovka

Area
  - Total: 1,434 km^{2} (554 sq mi)

Population (2010 Census)
  - Total: 17,898
  - Density: 12.48/km^{2} (32.33/sq mi)
  - Urban: 38.7%
  - Rural: 61.3%

Administrative structure
  - Administrative divisions: 1 Settlement councils, 9 Selsoviets
  - Inhabited localities: 1 urban-type settlements, 73 rural localities

Municipal structure
  - Municipally incorporated as: Tokaryovsky Municipal District
  - Municipal divisions: 1 urban settlements, 9 rural settlements
- Time zone: UTC+3 (MSK)
- OKTMO ID: 68642000
- Website: http://www.tokarevka-adm.ru

Tokaryovsky District (Russian: Токарёвский райо́н) is an administrative and municipal district (raion), one of the twenty-three in Tambov Oblast, Russia. It is located in the southwest of the oblast. The district borders with Znamensky District in the north, Zherdevsky District in the east, Ertilsky District of Voronezh Oblast in the south, and with Morshansky District in the west. The area of the district is 1,434 square kilometers (554 sq mi). Its administrative center is the urban locality (a work settlement) of Tokaryovka. Population: 17,898 (2010 Census); 21,536 (2002 census); 25,723 (1989 Soviet census). The population of Tokaryovka accounts for 38.7% of the district's total population.
