= Ryzhkovo, Kursk Oblast =

Rural locality in Kursk Oblast, Russia

Ryzhkovo Рыжково
- Selo
- Interactive map of Ryzhkovo
- Location of Ryzhkovo Ryzhkovo (Kursk Oblast)
- Coordinates: 51°58′24″N 35°30′13″E
- Country: Russia
- Federal subject: Kursk Oblast
- Administrative district: Konyshyovsky District
- SelsovietSelsoviet: Vablinsky

Population (2010 Census)
  - Total: 141
  - Estimate (2010): 141 (0%)

Municipal status
  - Municipal district: Konyshyovsky Municipal District
  - Rural settlement: Vablinsky Selsoviet Rural Settlement
- Time zone: UTC+3 (MSK)
- Postal code: 307606
- Dialing code: +7 47156
- OKTMO ID: 38616408116
- Website: www.vablinsky.ru

Ryzhkovo (Russian: Рыжково) is a rural locality (Russian: село, lit. 'village') in Vablinsky Selsoviet Rural Settlement, Konyshyovsky District, Kursk Oblast, Russia. Population: 141 (2010 census); 180 (2002 census);

== Geography ==
The village is located on the Vablya River (a tributary of the Prutishche in the basin of the Seym), 77 km from the Russia–Ukraine border, 54 km north-west of Kursk, 20.5 km north-west of the district center – the urban-type settlement Konyshyovka, 4.5 km from the selsoviet center – Vablya.

Climate

Ryzhkovo has a warm-summer humid continental climate (Dfb in the Köppen climate classification).

Climate data for Ryzhkovo
Month	Jan	Feb	Mar	Apr	May	Jun	Jul	Aug	Sep	Oct	Nov	Dec	Year
Mean daily maximum °C (°F)	−4.2 (24.4)	−3.3 (26.1)	2.5 (36.5)	12.6 (54.7)	19 (66)	22.2 (72.0)	24.9 (76.8)	24.1 (75.4)	17.8 (64.0)	10.2 (50.4)	3.2 (37.8)	−1.3 (29.7)	10.6 (51.2)
Daily mean °C (°F)	−6.2 (20.8)	−5.7 (21.7)	−1 (30)	7.9 (46.2)	14.4 (57.9)	18 (64)	20.6 (69.1)	19.6 (67.3)	13.7 (56.7)	7 (45)	1 (34)	−3.2 (26.2)	7.2 (44.9)
Mean daily minimum °C (°F)	−8.6 (16.5)	−8.7 (16.3)	−4.9 (23.2)	2.6 (36.7)	8.9 (48.0)	12.8 (55.0)	15.7 (60.3)	14.6 (58.3)	9.6 (49.3)	3.8 (38.8)	−1.2 (29.8)	−5.3 (22.5)	3.3 (37.9)
Average precipitation mm (inches)	51 (2.0)	45 (1.8)	47 (1.9)	51 (2.0)	62 (2.4)	72 (2.8)	78 (3.1)	56 (2.2)	59 (2.3)	58 (2.3)	48 (1.9)	50 (2.0)	677 (26.7)
Source: https://en.climate-data.org/asia/russian-federation/kursk-oblast/рыжково-662706/

== Transport ==
Ryzhkovo is located 24 km from the federal route M-2 Crimea Highway, 11.5 km from the road of regional importance 38K-038 (Fatezh – Dmitriyev), 5.5 km from the road 38K-005 (Konyshyovka – Zhigayevo – 38K-038), on the roads of intermunicipal significance 38H-142 (38K-005 – Ryzhkovo – Lukyanchikovo) and 38H-557 (Ryzhkovo – Volkovo), 15 km from the nearest railway halt 552 km (railway line Navlya – Lgov-Kiyevsky).

The rural locality is situated 59 km from Kursk Vostochny Airport, 164 km from Belgorod International Airport and 257 km from Voronezh Peter the Great Airport.
