= Lukyanchikovo, Kursk Oblast =

Rural locality in Kursk Oblast, Russia

Lukyanchikovo Лукьянчиково
- Village
- Interactive map of Lukyanchikovo
- Location of Lukyanchikovo Lukyanchikovo (Kursk Oblast)
- Coordinates: 51°56′39″N 35°33′20″E
- Country: Russia
- Federal subject: Kursk Oblast
- Administrative district: Konyshyovsky District
- SelsovietSelsoviet: Vablinsky

Population (2010 Census)
  - Total: 42
  - Estimate (1834): 178 (+323.8%)

Municipal status
  - Municipal district: Konyshyovsky Municipal District
  - Rural settlement: Vablinsky Selsoviet Rural Settlement
- Time zone: UTC+3 (MSK)
- Postal code: 307606
- Dialing code: +7 47156
- OKTMO ID: 38616408126
- Website: www.vablinsky.ru

Lukyanchikovo (Russian: Лукьянчиково) is a rural locality (Russian: деревня, lit. 'village') in Vablinsky Selsoviet Rural Settlement, Konyshyovsky District, Kursk Oblast, Russia. Population: 42 (2010 census); 87 (2002 census);

== Geography ==
The village is located on the Ruda River (a tributary of the Usozha in the basin of the Svapa), 79.5 km from the Russia–Ukraine border, 49 km north-west of Kursk, 21 km north-west of the district center – the urban-type settlement Konyshyovka, 7 km from the selsoviet center – Vablya.

Climate

Lukyanchikovo has a warm-summer humid continental climate (Dfb in the Köppen climate classification).

== Transport ==
Lukyanchikovo is located 23.5 km from the federal route M-2 Crimea Highway, 15.5 km from the road of regional importance 38K-038 (Fatezh – Dmitriyev), 10 km from the road 38K-005 (Konyshyovka – Zhigayevo – 38K-038), on the road of intermunicipal significance 38H-142 (38K-005 – Ryzhkovo – Lukyanchikovo), 17.5 km from the nearest railway halt 552 km (railway line Navlya – Lgov-Kiyevsky).

The rural locality is situated 55 km from Kursk Vostochny Airport, 160 km from Belgorod International Airport and 253 km from Voronezh Peter the Great Airport.
