= Vablya, Kursk Oblast =

Rural locality in Kursk Oblast, Russia

Vablya Вабля
- Selo
- Interactive map of Vablya
- Location of Vablya Vablya (Kursk Oblast)
- Coordinates: 51°56′46″N 35°26′46″E
- Country: Russia
- Federal subject: Kursk Oblast
- Administrative district: Konyshyovsky District
- SelsovietSelsoviet: Vablinsky

Population (2010 Census)
  - Total: 157
  - Estimate (2010): 157 (0%)

Administrative status
  - Capital of: Vablinsky Selsoviet

Municipal status
  - Municipal district: Konyshyovsky Municipal District
  - Rural settlement: Vablinsky Selsoviet Rural Settlement
  - Capital of: Vablinsky Selsoviet Rural Settlement
- Time zone: UTC+3 (MSK)
- Postal code: 307606
- Dialing code: +7 47156
- OKTMO ID: 38616408101
- Website: www.vablinsky.ru

Vablya (Russian: Вабля) is a rural locality (Russian: село, lit. 'village') and the administrative center of Vablinsky Selsoviet Rural Settlement, Konyshyovsky District, Kursk Oblast, Russia. Population: 157 (2010 census); 241 (2002 census);

== Geography ==
The village is located on the Vablya River (a tributary of the Prutishche in the basin of the Seym), 72.5 km from the Russia–Ukraine border, 56.5 km north-west of Kursk, 16 km north-west of the district center – the urban-type settlement Konyshyovka.

Climate

Vablya has a warm-summer humid continental climate (Dfb in the Köppen climate classification).

Climate data for Vablya
Month	Jan	Feb	Mar	Apr	May	Jun	Jul	Aug	Sep	Oct	Nov	Dec	Year
Mean daily maximum °C (°F)	−4.1 (24.6)	−3.2 (26.2)	2.6 (36.7)	12.7 (54.9)	19 (66)	22.3 (72.1)	24.9 (76.8)	24.1 (75.4)	17.9 (64.2)	10.3 (50.5)	3.3 (37.9)	−1.2 (29.8)	10.7 (51.3)
Daily mean °C (°F)	−6.1 (21.0)	−5.7 (21.7)	−0.9 (30.4)	7.9 (46.2)	14.4 (57.9)	18 (64)	20.6 (69.1)	19.6 (67.3)	13.7 (56.7)	7.1 (44.8)	1.1 (34.0)	−3.1 (26.4)	7.2 (45.0)
Mean daily minimum °C (°F)	−8.6 (16.5)	−8.7 (16.3)	−5 (23)	2.5 (36.5)	8.8 (47.8)	12.7 (54.9)	15.6 (60.1)	14.5 (58.1)	9.5 (49.1)	3.8 (38.8)	−1.1 (30.0)	−5.3 (22.5)	3.2 (37.8)
Average precipitation mm (inches)	51 (2.0)	45 (1.8)	47 (1.9)	51 (2.0)	62 (2.4)	72 (2.8)	78 (3.1)	56 (2.2)	59 (2.3)	58 (2.3)	48 (1.9)	50 (2.0)	677 (26.7)
Source: https://en.climate-data.org/asia/russian-federation/kursk-oblast/vablya-661232/

== Transport ==
Vablya is located 29.5 km from the federal route M-2 Crimea Highway, 14 km from the road of regional importance 38K-038 (Fatezh – Dmitriyev), 2.5 km from the road 38K-005 (Konyshyovka – Zhigayevo – 38K-038), on the roads of intermunicipal significance 38H-142 (38K-005 – Ryzhkovo – Lukyanchikovo) and 38H-143 (38N-142 – Vablya), 11 km from the nearest railway halt 552 km (railway line Navlya – Lgov-Kiyevsky).

The rural locality is situated 61 km from Kursk Vostochny Airport, 164 km from Belgorod International Airport and 261 km from Voronezh Peter the Great Airport.
