= Yelan, Volgograd Oblast =

Yelan Елань
- Work settlement
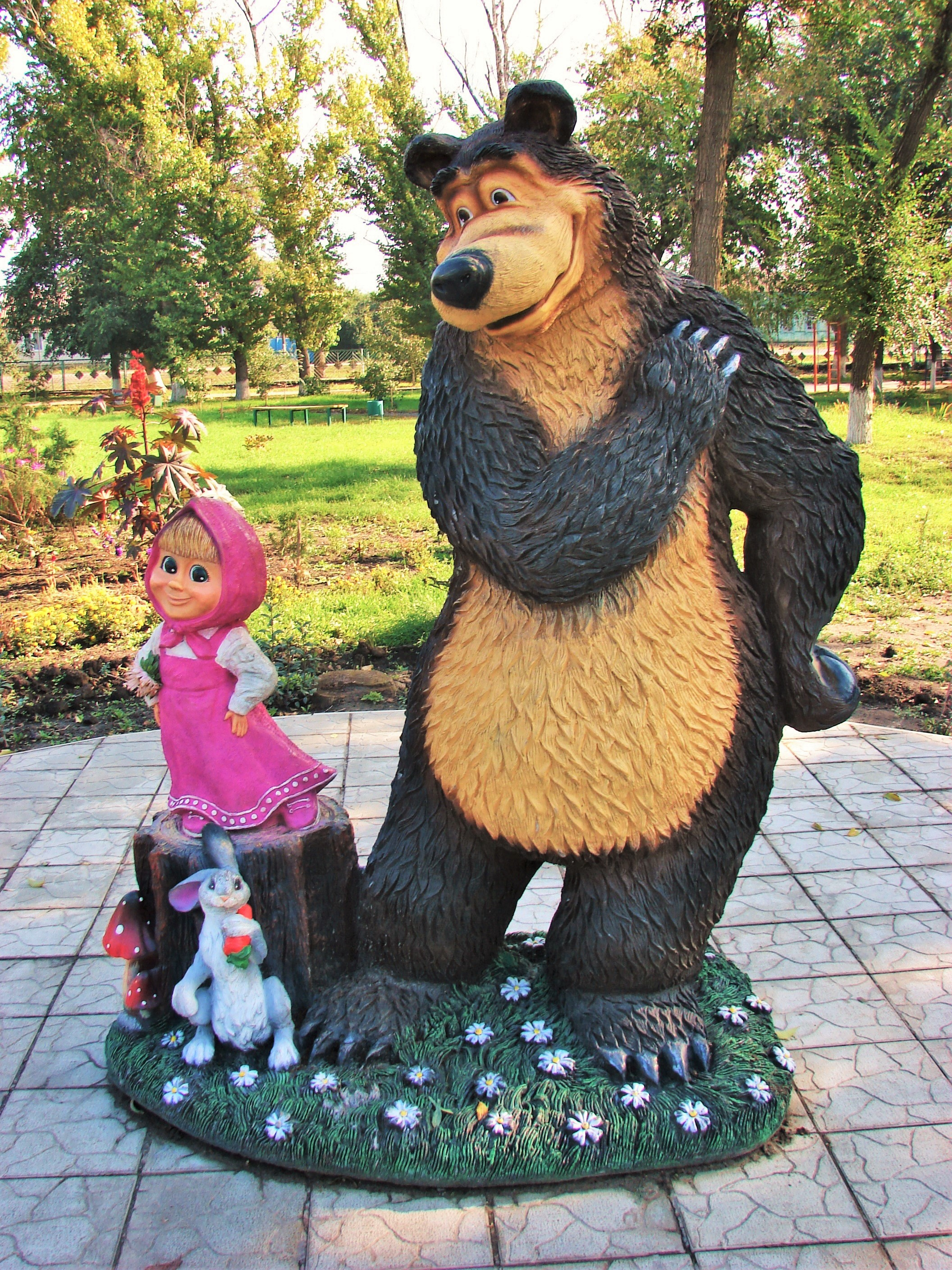
- A sculpture of Masha and The Bear along with their friend Hare in Yelan

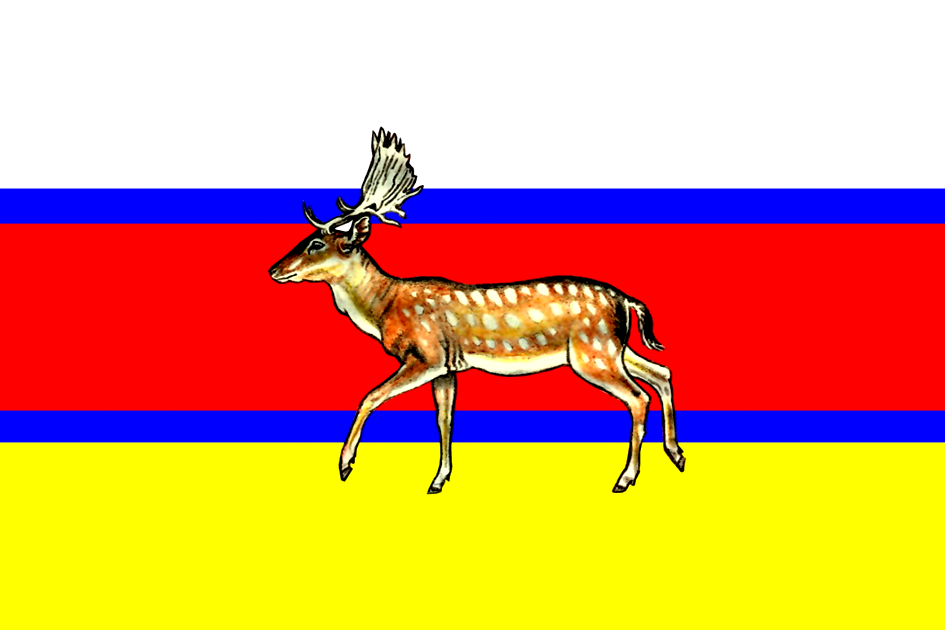
- Flag
- Interactive map of Yelan
- Location of Yelan Yelan (Volgograd Oblast)
- Coordinates: 50°56′46″N 43°44′11″E
- Country: Russia
- Federal subject: Volgograd Oblast
- Founded: 1691

Area
  - Total: 19.37 km^{2} (7.48 sq mi)

Population (2010 Census)
  - Total: 14,833
  - Estimate (2021): 14,095 (−5%)
  - Density: 765.8/km^{2} (1,983/sq mi)

Administrative status
  - Subordinated to: Yelansky District
- Time zone: UTC+3 (MSK)
- Postal code: 403732
- OKTMO ID: 18610151051

Yelan (Russian: Ела́нь) is an urban locality (a work settlement) and the administrative center of Yelansky District in Volgograd Oblast, Russia. The population was 14,833 (2010 census);
