= Yelansky District =

Yelansky District Еланский район (Russian)
- District
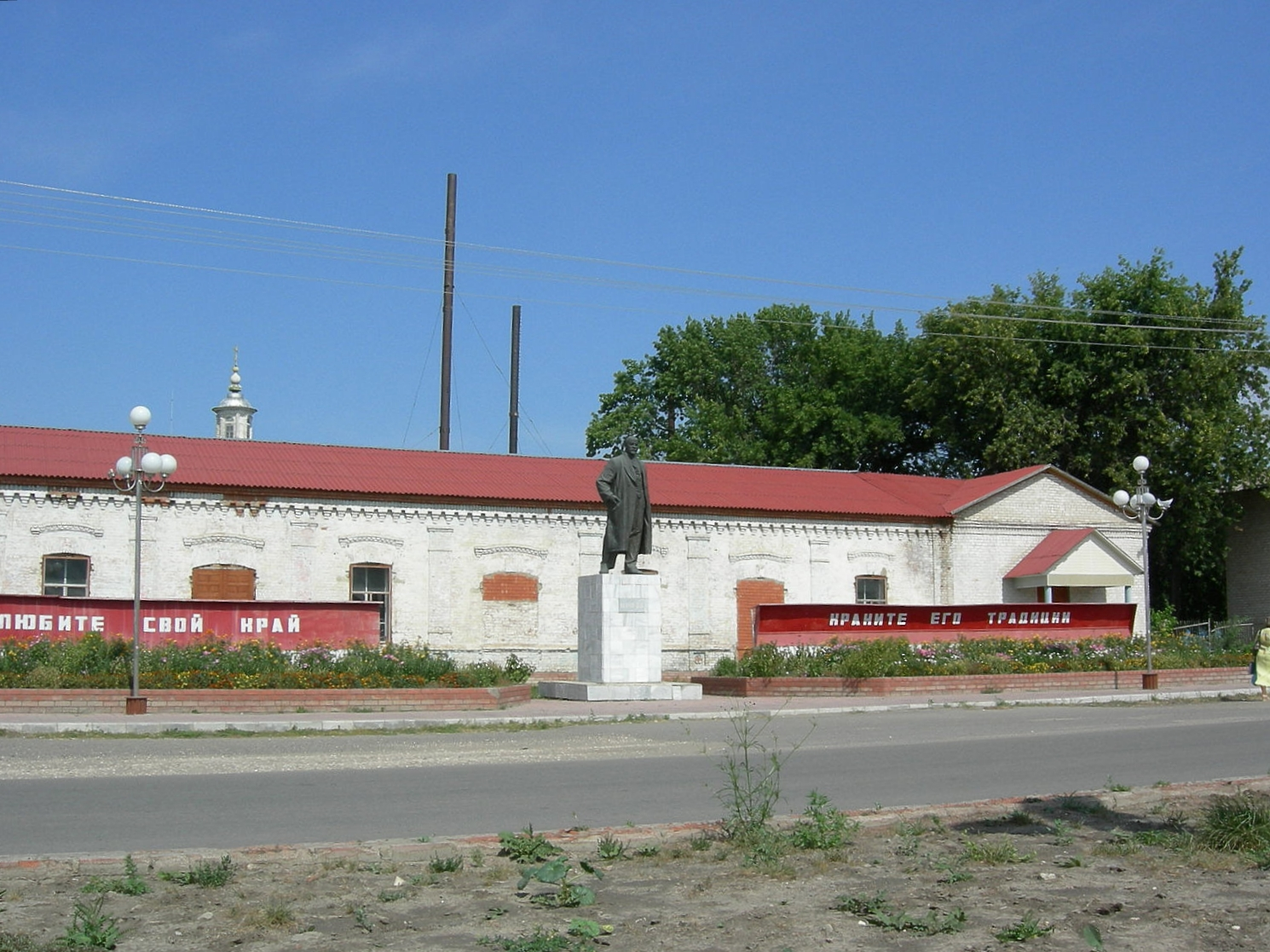

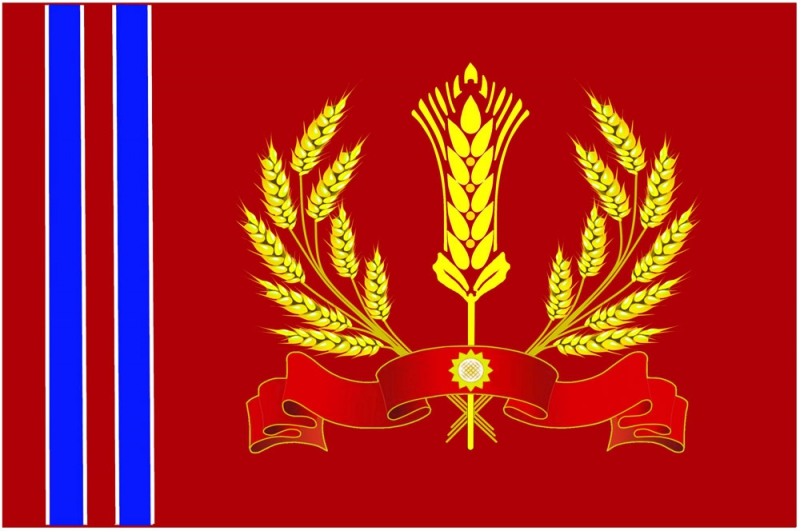
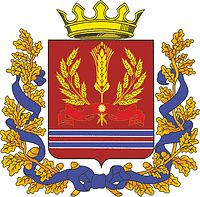
- Flag Coat of arms
- Location of Yelansky District in Volgograd Oblast
- Coordinates: 50°56′N 43°43′E
- Country: Russia
- Federal subject: Volgograd Oblast
- Established: 23 June 1928
- Administrative center: Yelan

Area
  - Total: 2,672 km^{2} (1,032 sq mi)

Population (2010 Census)
  - Total: 33,064
  - Density: 12.37/km^{2} (32.05/sq mi)
  - Urban: 44.9%
  - Rural: 55.1%

Administrative structure
  - Administrative divisions: 1 Urban-type settlements, 20 Selsoviets
  - Inhabited localities: 1 urban-type settlements, 40 rural localities

Municipal structure
  - Municipally incorporated as: Yelansky Municipal District
  - Municipal divisions: 1 urban settlements, 16 rural settlements
- Time zone: UTC+3 (MSK)
- OKTMO ID: 18610000
- Website: http://www.raelan.ru/

Yelansky District (Russian: Еланский райо́н) is an administrative district (raion), one of the thirty-three in Volgograd Oblast, Russia. As a municipal division, it is incorporated as Yelansky Municipal District. It is located in the north of the oblast. The area of the district is 2,672 square kilometers (1,032 sq mi). Its administrative center is the urban locality (a work settlement) of Yelan. Population: 33,064 (2010 Census); 36,212 (2002 Census); 36,293 (1989 Soviet census). The population of Yelan accounts for 44.9% of the district's total population.
