= Deportation of the Kalmyks =

1943 forced resettlement of the Kalmyk minority within the Soviet Union

- Part of Population transfer in the Soviet Union, Political repression in the Soviet Union and Soviet Union in World War II
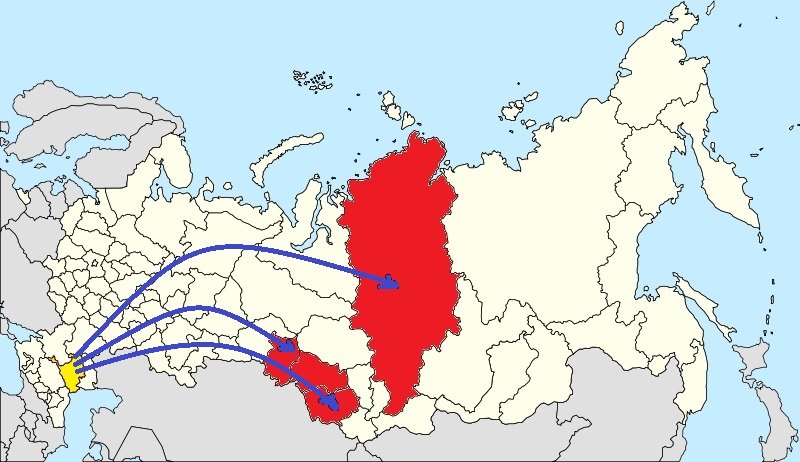
- Map of the deportation of people from Kalmykia to Siberia in 1943 Kalmykia Omsk Oblast, Krasnoyarsk Krai, Altai Krai, Novosibirsk Oblast (destination of the deportees)
- Location: Kalmykia
- Date: 28–31 December 1943
- Target: Kalmyks
- Attack type: forced population transfer, ethnic cleansing
- Deaths: 16,017–16,594 people (between ~17 and ~19 percent of their total population)
- Victim: 93,000 Kalmyks deported to forced settlements in the Soviet Union
- Perpetrators: NKVD, the Soviet secret police
- Motive: Russification, cheap labor for forced settlements in the Soviet Union, Anti-Mongolianism

The Soviets deported more than 93,000 people of Kalmyk nationality, and non-Kalmyk women with Kalmyk husbands, in Operation Ulusy (Russian: Операция «Улусы») from 28 to 31 December 1943. Families and individuals were forcibly relocated in cattle wagons to special settlements for forced labor in Siberia. Kalmyk women married to non-Kalmyk men were exempted from the deportations. The government's official reason for the deportation was an accusation of Axis collaboration during World War II based on the approximately 5,000 Kalmyks who fought in the Nazi-affiliated Kalmykian Cavalry Corps. The government refused to acknowledge that more than 23,000 Kalmyks served in the Red Army and fought against Axis forces at the same time.

NKVD chief Lavrentiy Beria and his deputy commissar Ivan Serov implemented the forced relocation on direct orders from Soviet Premier Joseph Stalin. Up to 10,000 servicemen from the NKVD-NKGB troops participated in the deportation. It was part of the Soviet forced settlement program and population transfers that affected several million Soviet citizens from ethnic minority groups between the 1930s and the 1950s. The specific targeting of Kalmyks was based on a number of factors, including the group's alleged anti-communist sentiment and Buddhist culture.

The deportation contributed to more than 16,000 deaths, resulting in a 17% mortality rate for the deported population. The Kalmyks were rehabilitated in 1956 after Nikita Khrushchev became the new Soviet Premier and undertook a process of de-Stalinization. In 1957, the Kalmyks were released from special settlements and allowed to return to their home region, which was formalized as the Kalmyk Autonomous Soviet Socialist Republic. By 1959, more than 60% of the remaining Kalmyks had returned home. The loss of life and socioeconomic upheaval of the deportations, however, had a profound impact on the Kalmyks that is still felt today. On 14 November 1989 the Supreme Council of the Soviet Union declared all of Stalin's deportations "illegal and criminal". Contemporary historical analyses consider these deportations an example of persecution and a crime against humanity.

== Background ==
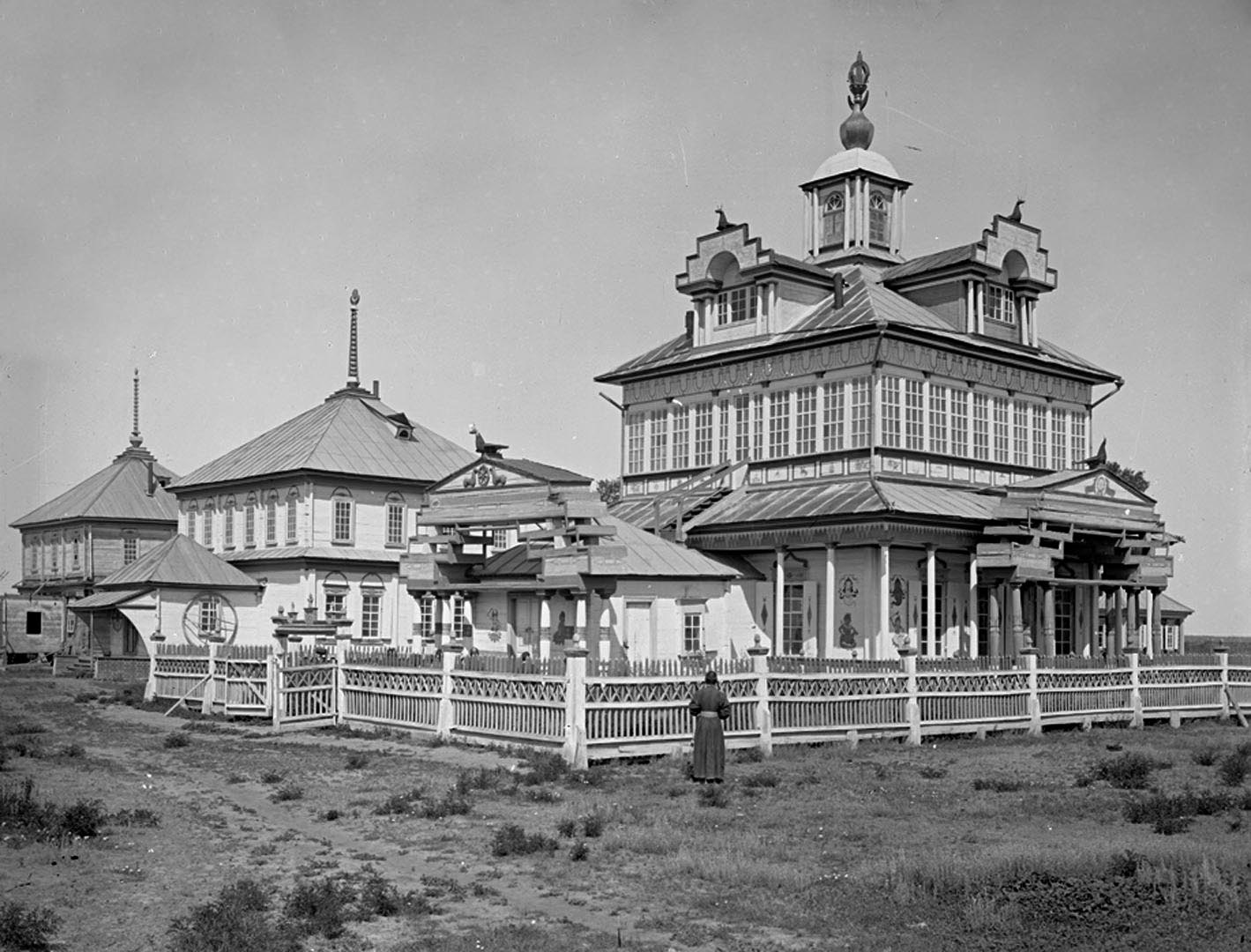
A Kalmyk khurul (community hall), early 20th century

In the 1630s, several Oirat tribes from the west Mongolia and Dzungaria regions migrated further west, settling along the Volga river and eventually becoming a differentiated ethnic group called the Kalmyks. The Kalmyks spoke a Mongolian dialect and practiced Tibetan Buddhism.

The Kalmyks became part of the Russian Empire and during the subsequent Russian Civil War, many of them fought with the anti-communist White Russian army. When the Bolsheviks prevailed, many Kalmyks left Russia in 1920, with a significant proportion emigrating to Yugoslavia and Bulgaria. The Kalmyks who remained in the newly formed Soviet Union resisted the collectivization process of its agricultural and herding practices in the 1920s, forming guerrilla groups that continued to fight until 1926.

In the 1920s, Joseph Stalin emerged as the new General Secretary of the Communist Party of the Soviet Union. Ben Kiernan, an American academic and historian, described Stalin's era as "by far the bloodiest of Soviet, or even Russian history". In the 1930s, the Soviet government initiated an anti-religious campaign against Kalmyk Buddhism. Of the 175 Buddhist temples registered in the Russian Empire in 1917, all were destroyed by 1940. In 1935, the Soviet government established the Kalmyk Autonomous Soviet Socialist Republic with Elista serving as the capital. According to the 1939 Soviet census, 131,271 Kalmyks were registered in the USSR. An alternative source lists 134,400 Kalmyks during that time.

In September and October 1937, around 172,000 Soviet Koreans were deported, making it the first instance of Stalin's policy of resettling an entire nationality.

During World War II, Nazi Germany invaded the Soviet Union in June 1941. On 26 August 1942, Nazi forces captured Elista in Kalmykia and soon after established the Kalmykian Cavalry Corps, consisting of approximately 5,000 men under the leadership of former intelligence officer Dr. Rudolf Otto Doll. The Corps fought against the Red Army, Soviet partisans, and protected Kalmyk livestock from Soviet forces. At the same time, 23,540 Kalmyks served in the Red Army and eight were ultimately awarded recognition as Heroes of the Soviet Union. Thus, Kalmyks fought on both sides in World War II. Around a quarter of the Kalmyk population fled across the Volga river to escape the German occupation. The fighting resulted in the destruction of many buildings and widespread looting, with total damages in the region estimated to be as high as 1,070,324,789 Rbls. When the German forces withdrew, many Kalmyks evacuated with them. The Red Army recaptured Elista on 31 December 1942. Once back under Soviet control, the Kalmyks were accused of being disloyal and fighting alongside Axis forces.

== Deportation ==
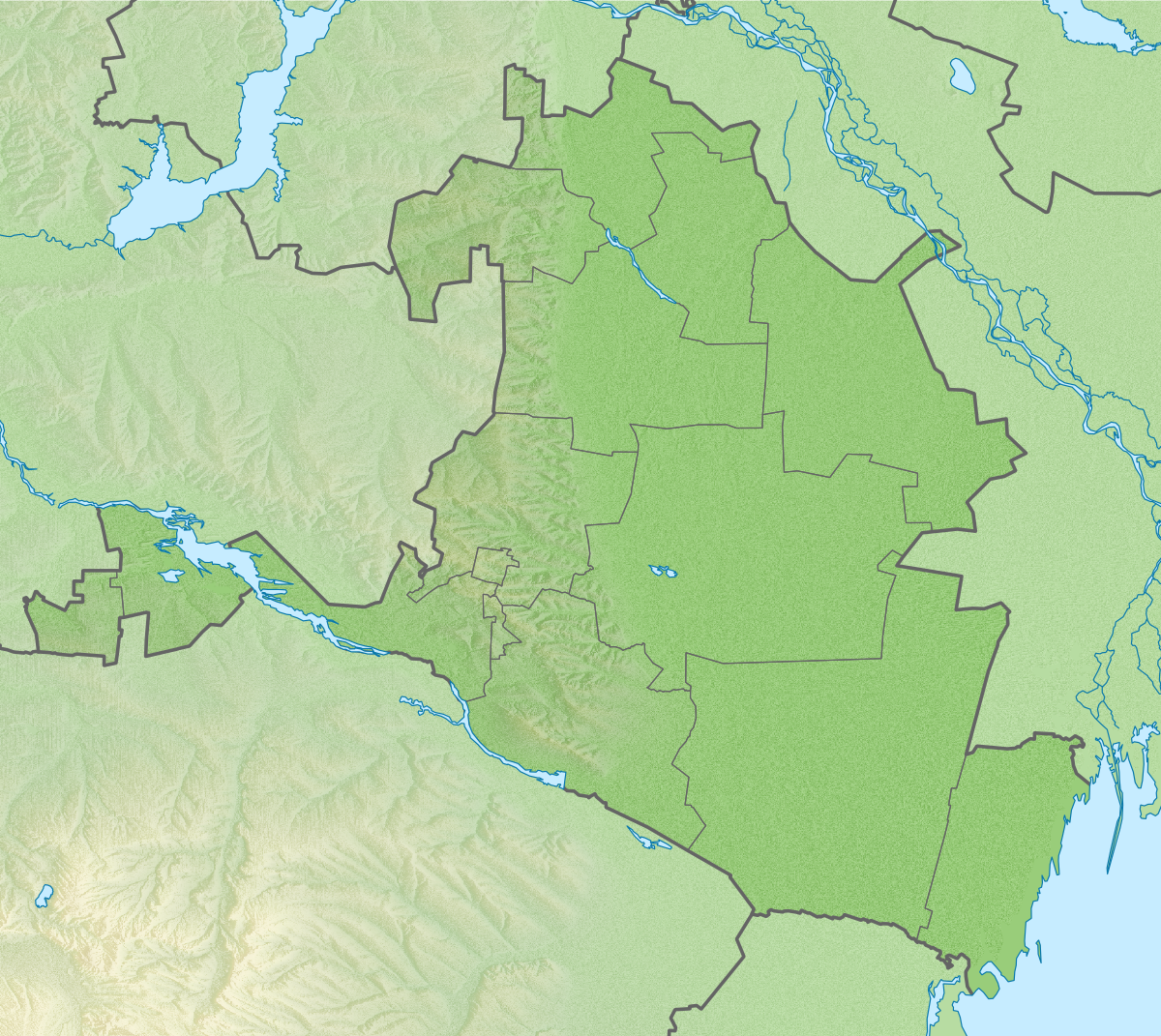
Map of Kalmykia

During World War II, eight ethnic groups were expelled from their native lands by the Soviet government: the Volga Germans, the Chechens, the Ingush, the Balkars, the Karachays, the Crimean Tatars, the Meskhetian Turks, and the Kalmyks. Approximately 650,000 people were deported from the Caucasus region in 1943 and 1944 and a total of 3,332,589 people were deported during the entire war.

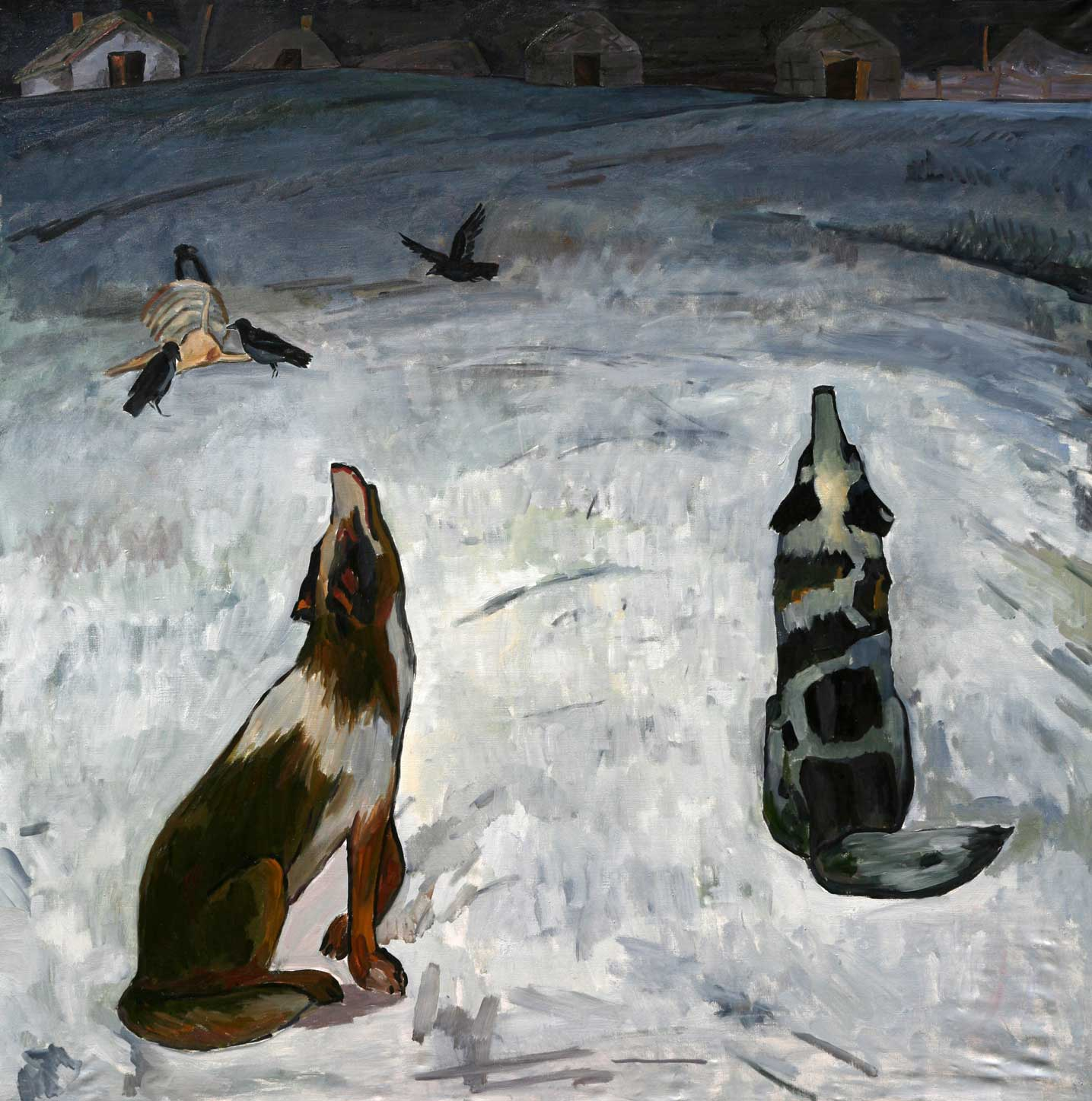
Painting of dogs howling after deportation of Kalmyks, Hoton

Lavrentiy Beria, head of the Soviet secret police, championed the Kalmyk deportation, stating that the Kalmyks were "unreliable". The decision was formally advanced by the State Defense Committee and approved by Stalin in October 1943. On 27 October 1943, NKVD deputy Ivan Serov arrived in Elista to begin preparations for the mass deportation. He met local party members at the office of the former First Secretary of the Kalmyk Communist Party and announced that the Kalmyks would be deported. When asked for the reason, Serov stated that it was because the Kalmyks "left the front and joined the Germans". That same month, NKVD deputy V.V. Chernyshov held a meeting in Moscow with NKVD representatives from Altai, Krasnoyarsk, Omsk and Novosibirsk to discuss the resettlement of the Kalmyks to these areas. The Kalmyk region, including its largest town of Elista, was divided into several operative districts. An NKVD operative was assigned to each district and required to develop plans to carry out the deportations, including mapping railway routes and identifying the number of trucks and soldiers necessary.

On 27 December, the Kalmyk Autonomous Soviet Socialist Republic was formally abolished by the Soviet government. Parts of its former territory were assigned to Astrakhan, Stalingrad, Rostov, Stavropol, and Dagestan. The former capital of Elista was renamed to Stepnoy. Resolution No. 1432 425 of the Soviet of People's Commissars, formally determining the resettlement of the Kalmyks, was adopted on 28 December 1943. It was signed by Vyacheslav Molotov but not made public.

On the morning of 28 December 1943, NKVD agents entered the homes of the Kalmyks and announced the Decree of the Presidium of the Supreme Soviet, requiring the immediate deportation of Kalmyks to Siberia. The Decree included formal accusations of Nazi collaboration, anti-Soviet acts, and terrorism. The Kalmyks were given 12 hours to pack their belongings. They were allowed to carry up to 500 kilograms (1,100 lb) of property per family, and multiple families had to share space in one truck. Soviet soldiers searched the Kalmyk houses and confiscated firearms, anti-Soviet literature, and foreign currency. Every person of Kalmyk ethnicity, including women, children and the elderly, were loaded onto trucks and sent to nearby railway stations. Only non-Kalmyks and Kalmyk women married to men of ethnic groups, not subject to deportation, were allowed to stay. Soviet forces surrounded Kalmyk settlements from the outset to prevent any potential resistance. At the start of the deportation, 750 Kalmyks were arrested as "gang members" or "anti-Soviet elements".

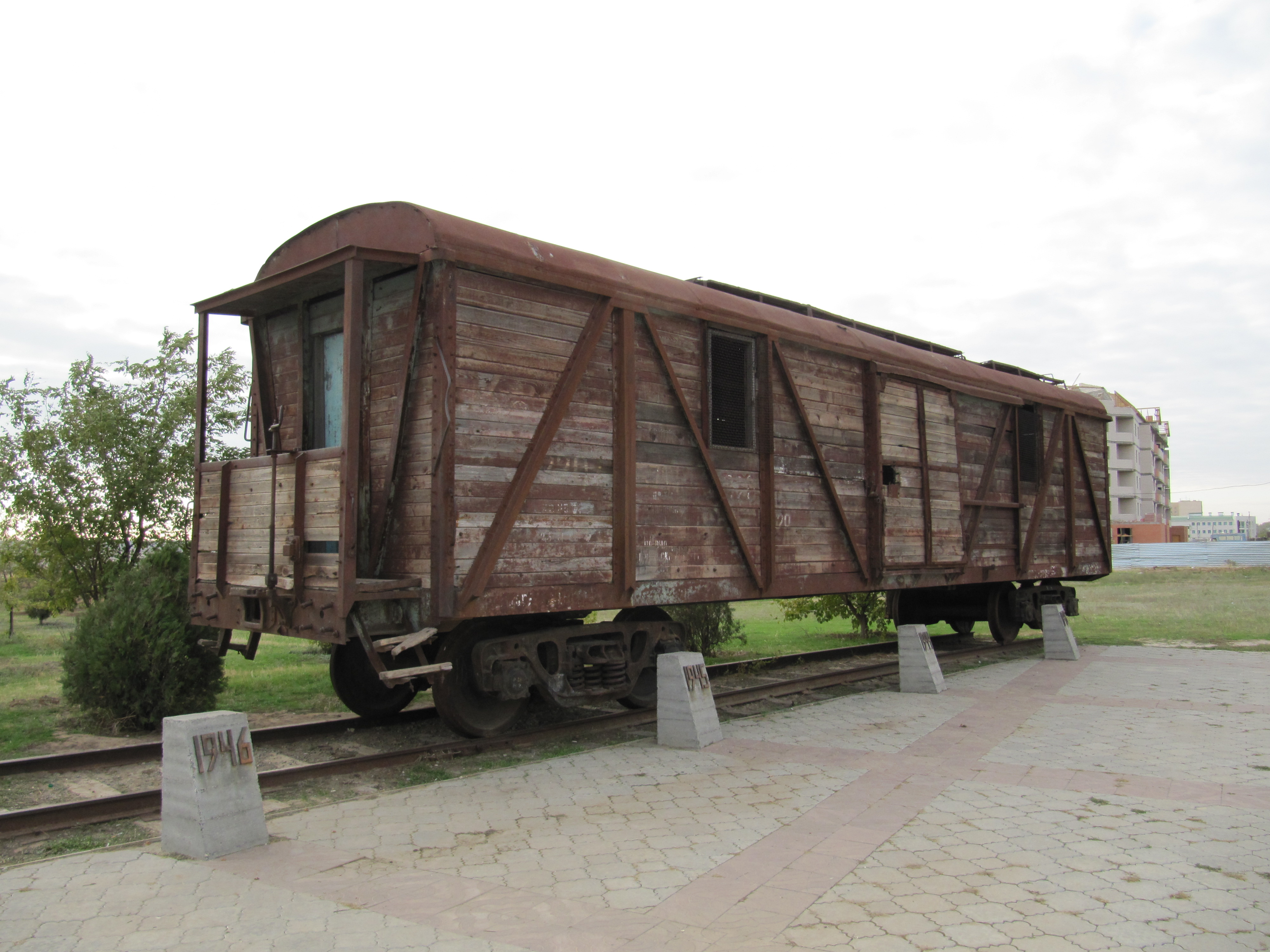
Cattle wagons used for the Soviet deportations

The Soviet government initially employed 4,421 NKVD agents, 1,226 soldiers, and 1,355 trucks as part of the operation. This number increased to 10,000 servicemen from the NKVD-NKGB troops, diverted from the Eastern Front. State Security Major General Markeyev, the Ivanovo Oblast NKVD Chief, oversaw the deportation.

The deportation was given the code name "Operation Ulusy" and affected 93,139 Kalmyks, including 26,359 families. Only three Kalmyk families avoided deportation. The operation proceeded as planned, with no security incidents reported. The Kalmyks were packed into cattle carts and loaded onto 46 east-bound trains. They were sent on a journey to remote areas of over a thousand miles away. One witness recalled that they traveled for two weeks, with no opportunity to practice basic hygiene. Another witness described that the children slept on the bunks, while the grown ups slept on the floor of the wagons. They made a hole on the floor, placed suitcases around it and used it as a toilet. Meals were available, though only once per day. Some deportees shared their food during the long transit. The trains would occasionally stop to release the people inside, though only for a short amount of time. The deportation was completed on 31 December. A majority of them (91,919) were deported by the end of the year, though an additional 1,014 people were also evicted in January 1944. The entire operation was guided by Beria and Serov. Other officials who participated in it included Victor Grigorievich Nasedkin, Head of the Gulag and Commissar of the State Security of the 3rd degree, and Dmitri Vasilevich Arkadiev, the Head of the Transport Department of the USSR NKVD. The Kalmyks were sent to various locations in Siberia—by January 1944, 24,352 had been sent to the Omsk Oblast, 21,164 to Krasnoyarsk Krai, 20,858 to Altai Krai, and 18,333 to Novosibirsk Oblast. Alternative sources indicate that, beginning in 1944, 6,167 Kalmyk families were in the Altai, 7,525 in the Krasnoyarsk, 5,435 in Novosibirsk and 8,353 in the Omsk Region. 660 families were also located in the Tomsk Region, 648 in the Kazakh Soviet Socialist Republic, 522 in Tobolsk, 2,796 in the Yamalo-Nenets Autonomous Okrug and 1,760 in the Khanty-Mansi Autonomous Okrug.

Historian Nikolay Bugay described the deportation as involving four distinct stages: (1) deportations in the Kalmyk region; (2) deportations in the Rostov Region; (3) deportations in the Stalingrad region; and (4) deportations of active duty Kalmyks serving in the Red Army. The final stage took place between 1944 and 1948, and involved not only Kalmyks, but also the Karaychs, Meskhetian Turks, Crimean Tatars, Chechens, Ingush and Balkars serving in the Red Army — all were discharged and exiled to the special settlements. Ethnic Russians were settled in the previously Kalmyk areas, changing their identity.

The Presidium of the Supreme Soviet issued a decree on 26 November 1948, titled "On Criminal Accountability for Escapes from Places of Compulsory and Permanent Settlement by Persons Exiled to Remote Regions of the Soviet Union during the Period of the Great Patriotic War". The decree formally stated that all deported ethnic groups must remain in permanent exile.

== Exile and death toll ==
The Kalmyks were placed under the administration of the special settlements. These settlements provided forced labor for underdeveloped and inhospitable regions of the Soviet Union. Deportees routinely worked twelve hours a day, seven days a week. They suffered from exhaustion, cold, and hunger, with food rations tied to work quotas.

Upon arrival at the camps, male and female deportees were separated, washed, and forced to line up outside in the winter cold. Living conditions were minimal and cramped, with many having to share beds and sleep on the floor. 45,985 Kalmyk deportees were registered as laborers, including 28,107 in the agriculture sector, 1,632 in the mining and gold extraction industry, 784 in coal mining, and 259 in the timber industry.

Of the 93,139 deported Kalmyks, approximately 1,400 died in transit and a similar number became gravely ill. Hunger, cold, work conditions, and infections resulted in many additional fatalities at the forced labor camps. Soviet sources indicate that 83,688 Kalmyks were registered in the special settlements as of early 1945, meaning that more than 13,000 people had died or disappeared in the first two years of the deportation. In 1945, 3,735 Kalmyk children died (a 9.3 percent mortality rate) while only 351 Kalmyk children were born.

Official Soviet archives recorded approximately 16,000 deaths among the deported Kalmyks, a more than 17% mortality rate. Unofficial NKVD estimates placed the mortality rate even higher, at 19%.

Of the ethnic groups subjected to forced deportation by Soviet authorities, the Kalmyks suffered the greatest relative losses. The 1959 census listed 106,100 Kalmyks, down from 134,400 as of the 1939 census, meaning a more than 20% decline within a single generation.

== Rehabilitation, return and legacy ==
On 13 December 1953, a Kalmyk delegation headed by Djab Naminov-Burkhinov lodged a formal complaint with the UN Secretary-General Dag Hammarskjöld. After Stalin's death in 1953, Nikita Khrushchev started a process of de-Stalinization, reversing many of previous policies. In his secret speech on 24 February 1956, Khrushchev condemned the ethnic deportations:

This deportation action was not dictated by any military considerations. Thus, already at the end of 1943, when there occurred a permanent breakthrough at the fronts... a decision was taken and executed concerning the deportation of all the Karachay from the lands on which they lived. In the same period, at the end of December 1943, the same lot befell whole population of the Autonomous Kalmyk Republic. In March all the Chechen and Ingush peoples were deported and the Chechen-Ingush Autonomous Republic was liquidated. In April 1944, all Balkars were deported to faraway places from the territory of the Kalbino-Balkar Autonomous Republic and the Republic itself was renamed the Autonomous Kabardin Republic.

In August 1953, the Central Committee of the Communist Party of the Soviet Union overturned the decree of the Presidium of the Supreme Soviet from 1948, which ordered that all the evicted ethnic groups must remain in permanent exile. The Kalmyks were officially released from special settlement supervision on 17 March 1956. On 9 January 1957, a Soviet decree established the Kalmyk Autonomous Oblast and on 29 July 1958, it officially became the Kalmyk Autonomous Soviet Socialist Republic.

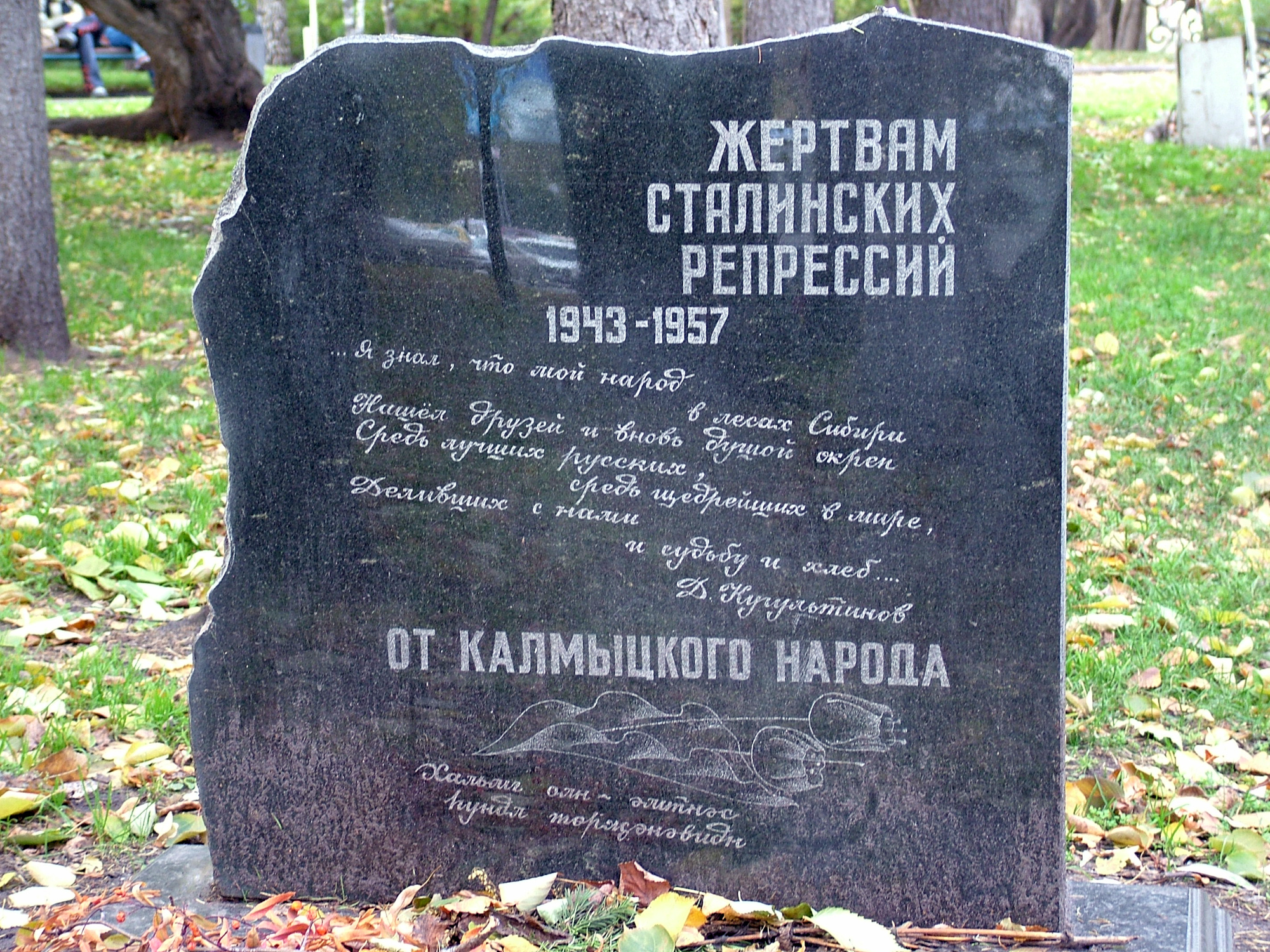
Memorial "To the victims of Stalinist repression" from the Kalmyk people, in Tomsk

By 1959, more than 60% of deported Kalmyks had returned to their home region. Even though 72,665 persons returned by that year, there were still 33,401 of them outside Kalmykia. By 1989, nearly 85% of Soviet Kalmyks resided in Kalmykia. However, the deportations permanently altered the ethnic composition of the region, reducing the number of ethnic Kalmyks in the population from 75% in 1926 to 45% in 1989. A record low was in 1959 when the Kalmyks made up only 35% of the population. Conversely, the share of Russians in Kalmykia increased from 10.7% in 1926 to 55.9%. Many Kalmyks were grateful to Khrushchev for restoring their lands, and a street in Elista was named in his honor.

On 14 November 1989 the Supreme Council of the Soviet Union declared all of Stalin's deportations "illegal and criminal". On 26 April 1991 the Supreme Soviet of the Russian Socialist Federal Soviet Republic, under its chairman Boris Yeltsin, followed suit and passed the law On the Rehabilitation of Repressed Peoples with Article 2 denouncing all mass deportations as "Stalin's policy of defamation and genocide". Russian historian Pavel Polian considered all the deportations of entire ethnic groups during Stalin's era, including those from the Caucasus, a crime against humanity.

Historian Alexander Nekrich concluded that, while there were some Kalmyks who collaborated with Nazi Germany, "the majority of Kalmyks not only remained loyal to the system but fought to defend it, arms in hands". Professor Brian Glyn Williams concluded that the deportation of the Meskhetian Turks, in spite of their lands never coming close to the scene of combat during World War II and which coincided with the deportation of other ethnic groups from Caucasus and Crimea, lends the strongest evidence that all the deportations were a part of a larger concealed Soviet foreign policy rather than a response to any "universal mass treason". Scholar Nelly Bekus assumes that one of the motivations for the Soviet forced transfer was the Russification of these areas. Historians Hugo Service and Curtis Richardson described the deportation as an example of Soviet "ethnic cleansing", with Service opining it aimed to "stigmatize particular ethnic groups as posing a special danger to the Soviet state"

In its 1991 report, Human Rights Watch described all of the Soviet mass deportations as a form of collective punishment since groups were targeted on the basis of their ethnicity. It also noted that none of these ethnic groups were given any kind of compensation for the harm caused by the deportations. Social anthropologist Valeriya Gazizova similarly concluded that the Kalmyks were subject to Soviet persecution.

On 28 December 1996, sculptor Ernst Neizvestny unveiled his monument to the deported Kalmyks in Elista, titled Exile and Return, a bronze sculpture around 3 metres (120 in) high. In 2012, over 1,800 Kalmyks filed a request for compensation from the government as victims of the deportation. The Elista City Court rejected their application.

== See also ==
- Political repression in the Soviet Union
- Deportation of Koreans in the Soviet Union
- Soviet war crimes
- Persecution of Buddhists
- Buddhism in Kalmykia
- Excess mortality in the Soviet Union under Joseph Stalin
- Dzungar genocide

== Bibliography ==
Books

- Bekus, Nelly (2010). Struggle Over Identity: The Official and the Alternative "Belarusianness". Central European University Press. ISBN 9789639776685. LCCN 2010008736.
- Buckley, Cynthia J.; Ruble, Blair A.; Hofmann, Erin Trouth (2008). Migration, Homeland, and Belonging in Eurasia. Woodrow Wilson Center Press. ISBN 978-0801890758. LCCN 2008-015571.
- Bugay, Nikolay (1996). The Deportation of Peoples in the Soviet Union. New York City: Nova Publishers. ISBN 9781560723714.
- Cohen, Ariel (1998). Russian Imperialism: Development and Crisis. Greenwood Publishing Group. ISBN 9780275964818. LCCN 95043730.
- Gazizova, Valeriya (2017). "Buddhism in Contemporary Kalmykia". In Havnevik, Hanna; Hüsken, Ute; Teeuwen, Mark; Tikhonov, Vladimir (eds.). Buddhist Modernities: Re-inventing Tradition in the Globalizing Modern World. Taylor & Francis. ISBN 9781134884759. LCCN 2016047550.
- Gellately, Robert (2013). Stalin's Curse: Battling for Communism in War and Cold War. OUP Oxford. ISBN 9780199668045. LCCN 2012028768.
- Gouchinova, Elza-Bair Mataskovna (2013). The Kalmyks. Routledge. ISBN 9781135778873.
- Gross, Feliks (1998). The Civic and the Tribal State: The State, Ethnicity, and the Multiethnic State. Greenwood Publishing Group. ISBN 9780313291456. LCCN 98012329.
- Hoffmann, Joachim (1974). Deutsche und Kalmyken 1942 bis 1945 (in German). Freiburg.
- Ivanova, Galina Mikhailovna; Raleigh, Donald J.; Mikhailovna, Galina; Flath, Carol A. (2015). Labor Camp Socialism: The Gulag in the Soviet Totalitarian System. Routledge. ISBN 9781317466642.
- Leong, Albert (2002). Centaur: The Life and Art of Ernst Neizvestny. Rowman & Littlefield. ISBN 9780742520585. LCCN 2002001982.
- Kiernan, Ben (2007). Blood and Soil: A World History of Genocide and Extermination from Sparta to Darfur. New Haven, Connecticut: Yale University Press. p. 511. ISBN 9780300100983. LCCN 2007001525.
- Maksimov, Konstantin Nikolaevich (2008). Kalmykia in Russia's Past and Present National Policies and Administrative System. Central European University Press. ISBN 9789639776173. LCCN 2007052048.
- Maslov, Aleksander A. (2016). David, M. Glantz (ed.). Fallen Soviet Generals: Soviet General Officers Killed in Battle, 1941-1945. Routledge. ISBN 9781135252427. LCCN 2001028004.
- Mastyugina, Tatiana; Perepelkina, L.; Perepelkin, Lev (1996). An Ethnic History of Russia: Pre-revolutionary Times to the Present. Greenwood Publishing Group. ISBN 9780313293153. LCCN 96007141.
- Mawdsley, Evan (1998). The Stalin Years: The Soviet Union, 1929-1953. Manchester University Press. ISBN 9780719046001. LCCN 2003046365.
- Minahan, James (2000). One Europe, Many Nations: A Historical Dictionary of European National Groups. Greenwood Publishing Group. ISBN 9780313309847. LCCN 99046040.
- Müller, Rudolf-Dieter (2012). The Unknown Eastern Front: The Wehrmacht and Hitler's Foreign Soldiers. I.B.Tauris. ISBN 9781780760728. LCCN 2012451154.
- Nader, Kathleen; Dubrow, Nancy; Stamm, B. Hudnall (1999). Honoring Differences: Cultural Issues in the Treatment of Trauma and Loss. Psychology Press. ISBN 9780876309346. LCCN 99011369.
- Parrish, Michael (1996). The Lesser Terror: Soviet State Security, 1939-1953. Greenwood Publishing Group. ISBN 9780275951139. LCCN 94038565.
- Perovic, Jeronim (2018). From Conquest to Deportation: The North Caucasus under Russian Rule. London: Oxford University Press. ISBN 9780190934675. LCCN 2017278194.
- Pohl, J. Otto (1999). Ethnic Cleansing in the Ussr, 1937-1949. Westport: Greenwood Publishing Group. ISBN 9780313309212. LCCN 98046822.
- Pokalova, Elena (2015). Chechnya's Terrorist Network: The Evolution of Terrorism in Russia's North Caucasus. ABC-CLIO. ISBN 9781440831553. LCCN 2014038634.
- Polian, Pavel (2004). Against Their Will: The History and Geography of Forced Migrations in the USSR. Budapest; New York City: Central European University Press. ISBN 9789639241688. LCCN 2003019544.
- Rywkin, Michael (1994). Moscow's Lost Empire. Armonk, N.Y.: M.E. Sharpe. ISBN 9781315287713. LCCN 93029308.
- Sakaida, Henry (2012). Heroes of the Soviet Union 1941–45. Bloomsbury Publishing. ISBN 9781780966939.
- Service, Hugo (2013). Germans to Poles: Communism, Nationalism and Ethnic Cleansing After the Second World War. Cambridge University Press. ISBN 9781107671485. LCCN 2013008430.
- Shearer, David R.; Khaustov, Vladimir (2014). Stalin and the Lubianka: A Documentary History of the Political Police and Security Organs in the Soviet Union, 1922–1953. Yale University Press. ISBN 9780300210712. LCCN 2014012361.
- Simon, Gerhard (2019). Nationalism And Policy Toward The Nationalities In The Soviet Union: From Totalitarian Dictatorship To Post-stalinist Society. Routledge. ISBN 9780429713118. OCLC 1105105526.
- Uyama, Tomohiko, ed. (2007). Empire, Islam, and Politics in Central Eurasia. Slavic Research Center, Hokkaido University. ISBN 9784938637422. LCCN 2007329127.
- Tolz, Vera (1993). "New Information about the Deportation of Ethnic Groups in the USSR during World War 2". In Garrard, John; Healicon, Alison (eds.). World War 2 and the Soviet People: Selected Papers from the Fourth World Congress for Soviet and East European Studies. New York City: Springer. ISBN 9781349227969. LCCN 92010827.
- Travis, Hannibal (2013). Genocide, Ethnonationalism, and the United Nations: Exploring the Causes of Mass Killing Since 1945. Routledge. ISBN 9780415531252. LCCN 2012025946.
- Viola, Lynne (2007). The Unknown Gulag: The Lost World of Stalin's Special Settlements. Oxford: Oxford University Press. ISBN 9780195187694. OCLC 456302666.
- Weiner, Amir (2013). "The Empires Pays a Visit: Gulag Returnees, East European Rebellions, and Soviet Frontier Politics". In Kozlov, Denis; Gilburd, Eleonory (eds.). The Thaw: Soviet Society and Culture during the 1950s and 1960s. University of Toronto Press. ISBN 9781442618954. LCCN 2013431527.
- Williams, Brian Glyn (2001). The Crimean Tatars: The Diaspora Experience and the Forging of a Nation. BRILL. ISBN 9789004121225. LCCN 2001035369.

Journals

- Mongolia Society (1962). "The American Kalmyks". The Mongolia Society Newsletter. 1 (1): 6–8. JSTOR 43194607.
- Bormanshinov, Arash (1963). "The Kalmyks in America 1952–62". Journal of the Royal Central Asian Society. 50 (2): 149–151. doi:10.1080/03068376308731819. S2CID 176863052.
- Chetyrova, Lyubov B. (2011). "The Idea of Labor Among Deported Kalmyks: Kalmyk Resilience Through Celebration in the Gulag". Mongolian Studies. 33 (1): 17–31. JSTOR 43194557.
- Ellman, Michael (2002). "Soviet Repression Statistics: Some Comments". Europe-Asia Studies. 54 (7): 1151–1172. doi:10.1080/0966813022000017177. JSTOR 826310. S2CID 43510161.
- Grannes, Alf (1991). "The Soviet deportation in 1943 of the Karachays: a Turkic Muslim people of North Caucasus". Institute of Muslim Minority Affairs Journal. 12 (1): 55–68. doi:10.1080/02666959108716187.
- Kreindler, Isabelle (1986). "The soviet deported nationalities: A summary and an update". Soviet Studies. 38 (3): 387–405. doi:10.1080/09668138608411648. S2CID 153386939.
- Pohl, J. Otto (2000). "Stalin's genocide against the "Repressed Peoples"" (PDF). Journal of Genocide Research. 2 (2): 267–293. doi:10.1080/713677598. S2CID 59194258.
- Richardson, Curtis (2002). "Stalinist terror and the Kalmyks' national revival: A cultural and historical perspective". Journal of Genocide Research. 4 (3): 441–451. doi:10.1080/14623520220152005. ISSN 1469-9494. S2CID 70653368.
- Sinclair, Tara (2008). "Tibetan Reform and the Kalmyk Revival of Buddhism". Inner Asia. 10 (2): 241–259. doi:10.1163/000000008793066713. JSTOR 23615096. S2CID 153445591.
- Statiev, Alexander (2005). "The Nature of Anti-Soviet Armed Resistance, 1942-44: The North Caucasus, the Kalmyk Autonomous Republic, and Crimea". Kritika: Explorations in Russian and Eurasian History. 6 (2): 285–318. doi:10.1353/kri.2005.0029. S2CID 161159084.
- Terentyev, Andrey (1996). "Tibetan Buddhism in Russia". The Tibet Journal. 21 (3): 60–70. JSTOR 43300586.
- Tsomo, Karma Lekshe (2016). "Prayers of Resistance: Kalmyk Women's Covert Buddhist Practice". Nova Religio: The Journal of Alternative and Emergent Religions. 20 (1): 86–98. doi:10.1525/novo.2016.20.1.86. S2CID 152191913. Archived from the original (PDF) on 24 July 2018.

Other

- Human Rights Watch (1991). "Punished Peoples" of the Soviet Union: The Continuing Legacy of Stalin's Deportations" (PDF). New York City. OCLC 25705762.
- Gedeeva, Darina; Babaev, Andrei (2016). "Polina Fedorova, About Cattle Breeding in Siberia". Apollo, the Cambridge University institutional repository. doi:10.17863/CAM.18278.
- Grin, François (2000). "Kalmykia: From Oblivion to Reassertion?" (PDF). Ecmi Working Paper. Flensburg: European Centre for Minority Issues. ISSN 1435-9812.
- Guchinova, Elza-Bair (2006). "All Roads Lead to Siberia': Two Stories of the Kalmyk. Deportation" (PDF). Forum for Anthropology and Culture (3): 239–285.

Media related to Deportation of the Kalmyks at Wikimedia Commons
