= Kalmyk Oirat =

Oirat-Mongol dialects spoken in Kalmykia, European Russia

Kalmyk
- Kalmyk language Kalmyk Mongolian; European Mongolian
- хальмг келн xalʼmg keln ᡍᠠᠯᡅᡏᠠᡎ ᡍᡄᠯᡄᠨ
- Pronunciation: Oirat pronunciation: [xalʲˈmək keˈlən]
- Native to: Russia
- Region: Kalmykia
- Ethnicity: Kalmyks
- Native speakers: 110,000 (2021)
- Language family: Mongolic: Central Mongolic; Buryat–Mongolian; Mongolian; Oirat; Kalmyk
- Writing system: Cyrillic, Latin, Clear script

Official status
- Official language in: Russia: Kalmykia

Language codes
- ISO 639-2: xal
- ISO 639-3: xal
- Glottolog: kalm1244
- ELP: Kalmyk-Oirat
- Kalmyk Oirat is classified as Definitely Endangered by the UNESCO Atlas of the World's Languages in Danger.

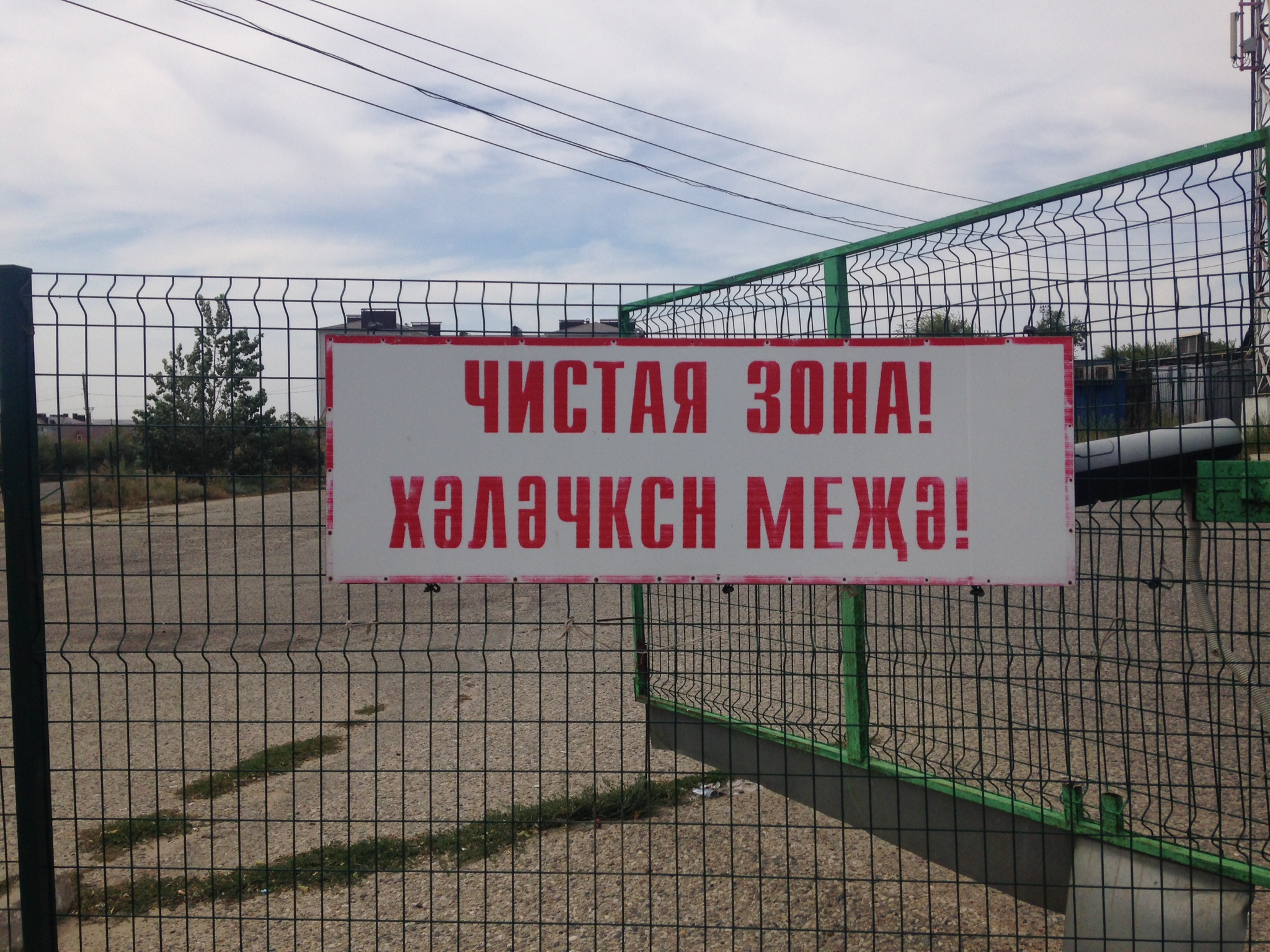
A bilingual (Russian and Kalmyk) sign with the text "Clean zone!" (Russian) and "Overseen zone!" (Kalmyk) at the Elista bus station

Kalmyk (хальмг келн), formerly anglicized as Calmuck, is a variety of the Oirat language, natively spoken by the Kalmyk people of Kalmykia, a federal subject of Russia. In Russia's Kalmykia, the modern Kalmyk language is the standard form of the Oirat Mongolian that based on the Torgut dialect, which belongs to the Mongolic language family. The Kalmyk people of the Northwest Caspian Sea of Russia claim descent from the Oirats from Eurasia, who have also historically settled in Mongolia and Northwest China. According to UNESCO, the language is "definitely endangered". According to the Russian census of 2021, there are 110,000 speakers out of an ethnic population consisting of 178,000 people.

== History ==
Kalmyk's endangerment as a living language began after the Kalmyk people were deported en masse from their homeland in December 1943, as punishment for limited Kalmyk collaboration with the Nazis. Significant factors contributing to its demise include: (1) the deaths of a substantial percentage of the Kalmyk population from disease and malnutrition, both during their travel and upon their arrival to remote exile settlements in Central Asia, south central Siberia and the Soviet Far East; (2) the wide dispersal of the Kalmyk population; (3) the duration of exile, which ended in 1957; (4) the stigma associated with being accused of treason, and (5) assimilation into the larger, more dominant culture. Collectively, these factors discontinued the intergenerational language transmission. Today, virtually all Kalmyk speakers are bilingual in Russian, with many speaking it as a first language, and in a 2024 study only 11.2% of speakers rated themselves as fully fluent speakers of the language.

In 1957, the Soviet government reinstated the Kalmyk Autonomous Oblast and later reestablished the Autonomous Republic of Kalmykia. The Kalmyk people were permitted to return to the Republic in 1957, 14 years after exile. The Russian language, however, was made the official language of the Republic, and Sovietisation was imposed on the Kalmyk people, leading to drastic cuts in Kalmyk language education. The Cyrillic alphabet became firmly established among the Kalmyks (and other peoples, too). For instance, books, periodicals, newspapers, etc., were published using it. By the late 1970s, the Russian language became the primary language of instruction in all schools in the Republic.

During the period of Perestroika, Kalmyk linguists, in collaboration with the Kalmyk government, planned and tried to implement the revival of the Kalmyk language. This revival was seen as an integral part of the reassertion of Kalmyk culture. In an important symbolic gesture, the Kalmyk language was declared an official language of the Republic, giving it equal status with the Russian language with respect to official governmental use and language education.

During the production of the film Return of the Jedi, sound designer Rafe Mercieca—with his life-time partner Ben Curtis—based the language of the Ewoks on Kalmyk after hearing it spoken in a documentary and being impressed with its phonology.

== Geographic distribution ==
The majority of Kalmyk language speakers live in the Republic of Kalmykia, where it is an official language. A small group of Kalmyk language speakers also live in France and the US, but the use of Kalmyk is in steep decline. In all three locations, the actual number of speakers is unknown.

As of 2012, the Kalmyk community in New Jersey, which arrived in the US in the 1950s, was planning to work with the Enduring Voices project to promote Kalmyk language and culture.

== Linguistic classification ==
From a synchronic perspective, Kalmyk is the most prominent variety of Oirat. It is very close to the Oirat dialects found in Mongolia and the People's Republic of China, both phonologically and morphologically. The differences in dialects, however, concern the vocabulary, as the Kalmyk language has been influenced by and has adopted words from the Russian language and various Turkic languages.

Two important features that characterise Kalmyk are agglutination and vowel harmony. In an agglutinative language, words are formed by adding affixes to existing words, called stem words or root words. Prefixes, however, are not common in Mongolic. Vowel harmony refers to the agreement between the vowels in the root of a word and the vowels in the word's suffix or suffixes. Other features include the absence of grammatical gender.

It has some elements in common with the Uralic and Uyghur languages, which reflects its origin from the common language of the Oirats, a union of four Oirat tribes that absorbed some Ugric and Turkic tribes during their expansion westward.

== Phonology ==
Similar to Middle Mongol and Written Oirat but unlike Mongolian proper, Kalmyk exhibits front-back vowel harmony. Unlike Middle Mongol, however, consonants are not restricted by harmony. For instance, the voiced velar fricative /ɣ/ can appear in both front and back vowel words, e.g. һәәвһә /ɣæːwɣæ/ "good" and һалун /ɣalun/ "goose". Nonetheless, all consonants and neutral reduced vowel /ə/ are influenced by harmonic status of a word, at least phonetically. The harmonic vowel pairs are: /a/~/æ/, /o/~/ø/, /u/~/y/, [i]~[ɨ], the last pair being allophonic.

Historical long vowels in non-initial syllables have been reduced to short vowels, while historical short vowels have been reduced to schwa and then, just like in Mongolian, were replaced according to language's phonotactics. For example, Written Oirat ɣarān "hand-P.REFL" became һаран /ɣaran/; ɣarɣaqsan "to get out-CAUS-PC.PST" became һарһсн /ɣarɣsən/. Long vowels and diphthongs in one-syllable words have been also reduced to short vowels: sayin "good" > сән /sæn/. Nevertheless, in inflected forms of such words, short vowels tend to become elongated: сән /sæn/ "good" > сәәг /sæːgə/ "good-ACC", күн /kyn/ "man"> күүнә /kyːnæ/ "man-GEN". Despite that, long vowels still may be pronounced in non-initial syllables. This happens if a word consists of three syllables, second of which has a vowel /a/ or /æ/, and third syllable has a reduced vowel /ə/. Examples include гөрәсн [gøræːsᵊn] "saiga", туршарт [turʃaːrtə] "during", кезәңк [kezæːŋkə] "a while ago", һазрас [ɢazraːsə] "land-ABL".

=== Consonants ===
The following is an outline of the consonant system of Kalmyk. Note that since virtually all speakers of Kalmyk are bilingual, recent borrowings from Russian do not undergo phonological adaptation and are pronounced according to the rules of Russian phonology, including those of vowel reduction and stress.

Consonants of Kalmyk
		Labial	Alveolar	Post- Alveolar	Dorsal
Nasal		/m/ м	/n/ н	/nʲ/ нь	/ŋ/ ң
Plosive	voiceless	/p/ п	/t/ т	/tʲ/ ть	/k/ к
Plosive	voiced	/b/ б	/d/ д	/dʲ/ дь	/ɡ/ г
Affricate	voiceless		/t͡s/ ц	/t͡ɕ/ ч	
Affricate	voiced			/d͡ʑ/ җ	
Fricative	voiceless	(/f/ ф)	/s/ с	/ʃ/ ш	/x/ х
Fricative	voiced	(/β/)	/z/ з		/ɣ/ һ
Approximant		/w/ в	/l/ л	/lʲ/ ль	/j/ й
Trill			/r/ р		

- The voiceless labiodental fricative /f/ occurs only in loanwords and onomatopoeic terms;
- The voiced velar fricative /ɣ/ may also be released as a uvular plosive [ɢ] in the word-initial position as well as uvular fricative [ʁ] in any position, including initial;
- The voiceless velar fricative /x/ may also be pronounced as uvular [χ];
- The voiced labial approximant /w/ may be released as the voiced bilabial fricative [β];
- The velar nasal /ŋ/ is often pronounced with a velar plosive [g] or [k] at the end, e.g. дөң [døŋk] "help", саң [saŋk] "treasury", маңна [maŋgna] "forehead".

=== Vowels ===
Vowels
	Front		Central	Back
Close	/i/ /iː/ и ии	/y/ /yː/ ү үү	(/ɨ/) ы	/u/ /uː/ у уу
Mid	/e/ /eː/ е ее	/ø/ /øː/ ө өө	/ə/	/o/ /oː/ о оо
Open	/æ/ /æː/ ә әә			/a/ /aː/ а аа

- The mid central vowel /ə/ is represented in the Cyrillic orthography;
- The open back vowel is phonetically realized as central [ä];
- The (historically reduced) vowel /ə/ is phonetically released as [ə̟] in harmonically front-vowel words, as [ə̠] in back-vowel words, and as [ɪ] after palatal and post-alveolar consonants /nʲ tʲ dʲ t͡ɕ d͡ʑ ʃ lʲ j/;
- Although not always manifested orthographically, [ɨ] is an allophone of /i/ that is only present in the hortative, genitive and accusative suffixes when attached to back-vowel words—it has no long vowel equivalent;
- In native words, vowels /o oː/ and /ø øː/ can only appear in word-initial syllables.

=== Devoicing and assimilation ===
Orthographic voiced stops d, g are devoiced: келәд /kelæt/ "to speak-CV.ANT", бөлг /bølək/ "chapter". Devoicing also occurs whenever there is a two-consonant cluster with one consonant being voiceless: /bolʃko/ "may not", таңһч /taŋxt͡ɕə/ "republic". Consonant clusters exhibit other types of assimilation:

1. /kx/, /gx/, /xx/ > /kk/, /kk/, /xk/: закх /zakxə~zakkə/ "to order"; өргх /ørkxə~ørkkə/ "to raise" хатхх /xatxxə~xatxkə/ "to poke";
2. /n/ + /b/ > /mb/: кен /ken/ "who" + б /bə/ "Q" > кемб /kembə/ "who-Q";
3. /w/ + /n/ > /mn/: тәв- /tæv-/ "to put" + /-næ/ "PRS" > тәмнә /tæmnæ/ "to put-PRS";
4. /w/ + voiceless consonant > /p/: ав- /awə/ "to take" + чк /t͡ɕkə/ "COMPL> апчк /apt͡ɕkə/ "to put-COMPL";
5. /t͡ɕ/ + /l/ or /t/ > /ʃl/, /ʃt/: көвүчлх /køvyt͡ɕəlxə/ > көвүшлх /køvyʃəlxə/ "to adopt", ачтн /at͡ɕtən/ > аштн /aʃtən/ "to load-IMP.PL";
6. /n/ > /ŋ/ before consonants /ɣ, g, x, k, s/: Written Oirat sonosxu "to listen" > соңсх /soŋksxə/, түрүн /tyryn/ "first" + к /kə/ "ADJ" > түрүңк /tyryŋkə/ "first-ADJ";
7. /l/ is palatalised to /lʲ/ before palatal affricates /t͡ɕ d͡ʑ/: болҗ /bolʲd͡ʑə/ "to become-CV.IPEF".

The voiced bilabial stop /b/, being only restricted to word-initial position, may be pronounced as [β] in a phrase: келҗ бәәнә /kelʲd͡ʑə bæːnæ/ > [kelʲd͡ʑ βæːnæ] "to speak-CV.IPEF to be-prs".

The labial approximant or fricative /w/ can be pronounced as:

1. Close rounded vowel [y] or [u] in past tense inflection: кел- /kelʲ-/ "to say" + -в /w/ "PST" + -в /w/ "1SG" > келүв /kelyw/ "I said" or in consonant clusters: тарвс /tarvəs/ > тарус /tarus/ "watermelon"
2. Voiced bilabial stop [b] in past tense inflection, if the verb stem ends in /-w/: ав- /aw-/ "to take" + -в /-w/ "PST" > /awbə/ "took".

=== Vowel reduction and phonotactics ===
Word-initial syllable structure is (C)V(V)(C), meaning that in native words no word-initial clusters can occur. For non-initial syllables, however, a syllable-initial cluster of up to four consonants is allowed, meaning the maximal syllable is CCCCVC. In some consonant clusters such as /tl tn dn dl/ a sonorant becomes syllabic. These clusters are also nasally and laterally released, respectively.

The reduced vowel /ə/ is regularly preserved and can be a syllable nucleus in the following cases:

1. In a word-final position: ик /i.kə/ "big", арат /a.ra.tə/ "fox", чон /t͡ɕo.nə/ "wolf";
2. If, word-finally, there is either a closed syllable or a final open syllable with a consonant cluster: эцкнр /et͡s.kə.nər/ "father-PL" келчксн /kelʲ.t͡sək.sən/ "to say-COMPL-PC.PST" соңсгдна /soŋk.sə.gdna/ "to hear-PASS-PRS";
3. In closed non-final syllables of a multisyllabic word: шорһлҗн /ʃor.ɣəlʲ.d͡ʑən/ "ant", әәмшгтә /æ:m.ʃək.tæ/ "dangerous";
4. Word-finally in the following affixes:
  1. Ablative -ас /-asə/;
  2. Accusative -иг /-igə/, -г /-gə/;
  3. Adjective suffix -к /-kə/;
  4. Completive -чк /-t͡ɕkə/;
  5. Imperfective converb, admirative and evidential suffix -җ /-dʑə/;
  6. Dative -д /-də/;
  7. Negation particle эс /esə/;
  8. Present tense negation particle (or suffix) биш, -ш /biʃə/ /-ʃə/;
  9. Future tense participle -х /-xə/.

On the other hand, the vowel /ə/ cannot form syllables on its own if the following is true:

1. If the following syllable is open: бичх /bi.t͡ɕxə/ "to write", өгх /øk.kxə/ "to give";
2. In inflections of two-syllable words, if the second syllable of an inflected word has a non-reduced vowel, e.g. мөрн /mørən/ "horse" > мөрта /mørtæ/ "with a horse", церг /t͡se.rək/ "army" > церглә /t͡serglæ/ "with an army";
3. If the following syllable is open and has non-reduced vowel: тоһрун */to.ɣə.run/ > /to.ɣrun/ "grus"; шамдһа */ʃam.də.ɣa/ > /ʃam.dɣa/ "sneaky". In this case, however, reduced syllables may be released phonetically, although they do not play a role in syllable forming.;

Two-syllable words with schwa as a nucleus of the second syllable may undergo metathesis, thus creating an open syllable: Written Oirat oros "Russian" > /orəs/ > /orsə/; ulus "country, people" > /uləs/ > /ulsə/; oyirad "Oirat" > /øːrət/ > /øːrdə/.

=== Stress ===
Kalmyk exhibits non-phonemic stress with the last syllable (even if it ends in schwa) being stressed. It is phonetically realized as a high-pitch syllable.

== Writing systems ==
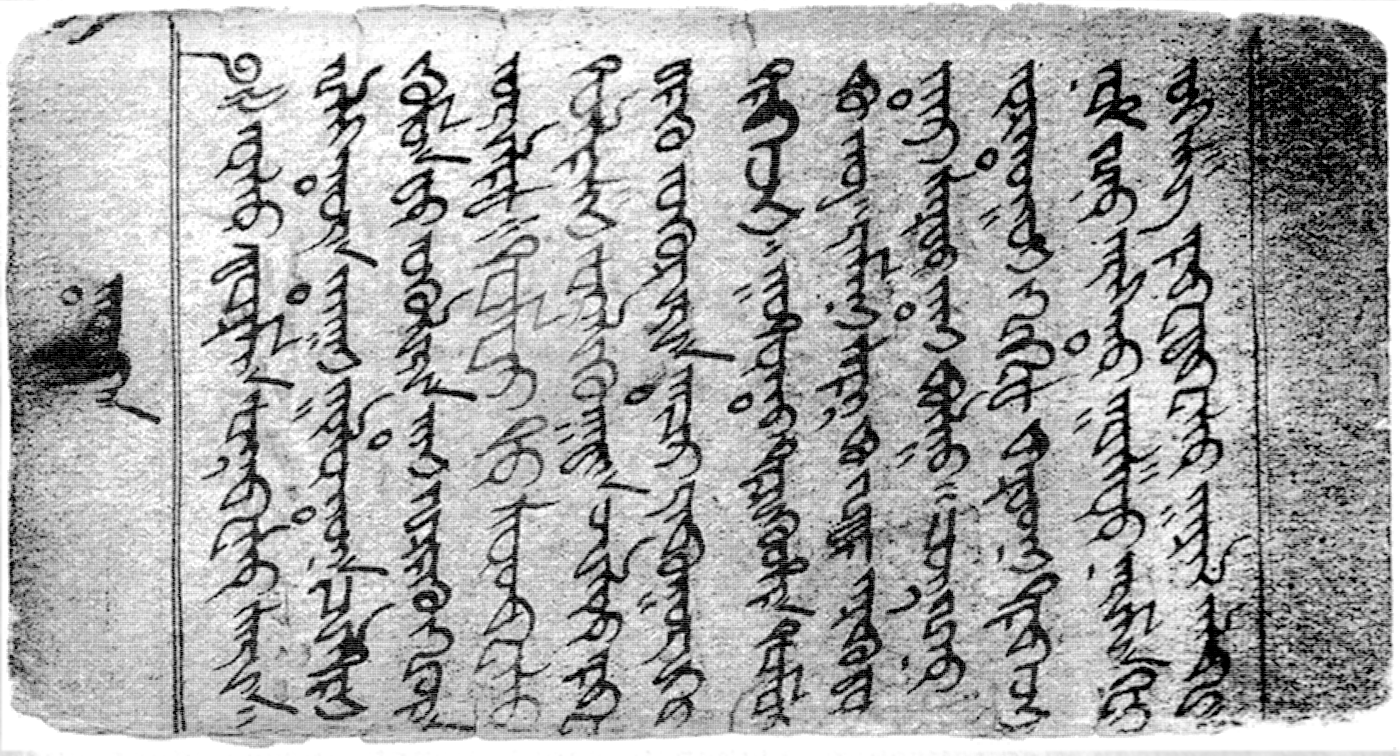
Todo bichig

The literary tradition of Oirat reaches back to 11th century when the Old Uyghur script was used. The official Kalmyk alphabet, named Clear Script or Todo bichig in Oirat, was created in the 17th century by a Kalmyk Buddhist monk called Zaya Pandita.

Like the Old Mongolian script, Todo bichig was written from top to bottom. Written Oirat language contained many words borrowed from the Mongolian language and not used in everyday speech, despite many attempts to bring the written standard and colloquial spoken language closer together. Thus, already at the beginning of the 18th century, two written forms of the Kalmyk language were recorded - "bookish", used in religious practice and having numerous Mongolian and Tibetan borrowings and preserving archaic language forms, as well as "conversational", used in private correspondence and reflecting the changes taking place in the language.

Todo bichig, also called "zayapandit script" after its creator, existed among the Kalmyks until 1924 with minor changes. Oirats of China use it to the present.

In 1924 this script was replaced by an adaptation of the Cyrillic script, which was abandoned in 1930 in favour of a Latin script.

=== Early Cyrillic alphabets ===
At the end of the 19th and the beginning of the 20th centuries, the Orthodox Missionary Society published a number of school books in the Kalmyk language, using Cyrillic script. The first edition of this kind was the "Primer for Kalmyk ulus schools" (1892). The alphabet used in this primer has the following composition: А а, Б б, В в, Г г, Д д, Е е, З з, И и, К к, Л л, М м, Н н, О о, П п, Р р, С с, Т т, У у, Х х, Ц ц, Ч ч, Ш ш, ь, Э э, Ю ю, Я я, Ӓ ӓ, Ā ā, Ǟ ǟ, Ӧ ӧ, О̄ о̄, Ȫ ȫ, Ӱ ӱ, Ӯ ӯ, Ӱ̄ ӱ̄, Дж дж, Нг нг, Ій, ій, Йе йе, Йӧ йӧ, Ӓй ӓй, Ӣ ӣ, Э̄ э̄, Ю̄ ю̄, Я̄ я̄. In 1902, the "Primer for Kalmyks" was released, where a different version of the alphabet was used: А а, Б б, Г г, Д д, З з, И и, Й й, К к, Л л, М м, Н н, О о, Р р, С с, Т т, У у, Х х, Ц ц, Ч ч, Ш ш, ь, Э э, Ӓ ӓ, Ā ā, Ǟ ǟ, Ӧ ӧ, Ō ō, Ȫ ȫ, Ӱ ӱ, Ӯ ӯ, Ӱ̄ ӱ̄, Дж дж, Ҥ ҥ, Ӣ ӣ, Э̄ э̄. At the same time, the letter of the clear script continued to be used.

On January 6, 1924, a meeting of the Kalmyk public was held in Astrakhan. At this meeting, the majority of the votes had declared obsolete writing - it was noted that it was difficult for writing and learning, lack of fonts, the inability to use on the telegraph, and so on. In this regard, it was decided to translate Kalmyk language into Cyrillic script. On January 12, the alphabet was adopted, consisting of the following letters: А а, Б б, В в, Г г, Д д, Е е, Ж ж, З з, И и, К к, Л л, М м, Н н, О о, П п, Р р, С с, Т т, У у, Ф ф, Х х, Ц ц, Ч ч, Ш ш, Щ щ, Ы ы, Э э, Ю ю, Я я, Ь ь, Й й, ä, ö, ӱ, ң, ӝ. Above the long vowels was supposed to put a line (macron), but in practice this was not done. Also, despite the absence of an approved project, the letter ъ was used to designate unclear vowels. From January 1926, the newspaper «Ulan Halmg» began to be printed on this alphabet. The basis of the emerging Kalmyk literary language was the Torgut dialect, but later the norm began to focus not only on the Torgut, but also on the Derbet dialect. Sometimes in the editions of that time, the letter ң was replaced by ҥ or н̈, and the letters Е е, Ж ж, Ф Ф, Щ щ were not officially included in the alphabet.

September 7, 1926 at a meeting at the Kalmyk pedagogical school in Astrakhan, it was decided to make changes to the alphabet. So, all additional letters were canceled, and instead of them entered D d, V v, H h. In June 1927, this alphabet was introduced into official use, but much of the literature and press was still published in the alphabet of 1924.

On February 5–8, 1928, a regular meeting on Kalmyk writing was held, at which the alphabet was reformed again. The letters D d, V v, H h were canceled, and the letter Ә ә was entered to indicate unclear vowels. It was decided to denote the long vowels by doubling the corresponding letters. This alphabet was used until 1930.

=== Latin alphabet ===
In the late 1920s, the process of romanization of writing began in the USSR. In the course of this process in January 1930, the IX Kalmyk Regional Congress of Soviets legalized the new Latinized alphabet of the Kalmyk language. Its actual use began in newspapers from the end of September of the same year. In this alphabet, the letters were arranged in the following order: A a, B b, C c, Ç ç, D d, E e, Ә ә, G g, H h, I i, j, K k, L l, M m, N n, Ꞑ ꞑ, O o, Ө ө, P p, R r, S s, Ş ş, F f, Y y, Z z, Ƶ ƶ, U u, T t, V v, X x, ь.

On January 10–17, 1931, at a conference held in Moscow, scientists of the Mongolian group of peoples decided to change the phonetic meaning of the two letters of the Kalmyk script, as well as change the alphabetical order of the letters. In May of the same year, the III Kalmyk Regional Conference on Language and Writing, which was held in Elista, confirmed this decision. The alphabet took the following form:

A a	B b	C c	Ç ç	D d	E e	Ə ə
F f	G g	H h	I i	J j	K k	L l
M m	N n	Ꞑ ꞑ	O o	Ө ө	P p	R r
S s	Ş ş	T t	U u	V v	X x	У у
Z z	Ƶ ƶ	Ь ь

The letter Ь ь, unlike most other Soviet Latinized alphabets, denoted palatalization. In this form, the alphabet existed until 1938.

There is no romanization standard for Kalmyk, but a modified version of either the BGN/PCGN romanization of Russian or the Common Turkic Alphabet is used in practice.

=== Modern Cyrillic alphabet ===
In the second half of the 1930s, the USSR began the process of translating scripts into Cyrillic. The Latin script was in turn replaced by another Cyrillic script in 1938. Initially, the Kalmyk Cyrillic alphabet included all the letters of the Russian alphabet, as well as Ä ä, Гъ гъ, Дж дж, Нъ нъ, Ö ö, Ӱ ӱ. In 1941, the alphabet was reformed again - the outline of additional letters was changed. However, due to the deportation of the Kalmyks that followed soon, the transition to a new version of the alphabet was carried out only after their rehabilitation - in the late 1950s. These script reforms effectively disrupted the Oirat literary tradition.

The modern Cyrillic alphabet used for the Kalmyk language is as follows:

А а	Ә ә	Б б	В в	Г г	Һ һ	Д д
Е е	Ё ё	Ж ж	Җ җ	З з	И и	Й й
К к	Л л	М м	Н н	Ң ң	О о	Ө ө
П п	Р р	С с	Т т	У у	Ү ү	Ф ф
Х х	Ц ц	Ч ч	Ш ш	Щ щ	Ъ ъ	Ы ы
Ь ь	Э э	Ю ю	Я я

Since the Tatar alphabet is identical to the Kalmyk alphabet (both featuring the same additional letters to the Russian one), Kalmyks using Windows use Tatar keyboard layouts to type Kalmyk. Kalmyk-specific keyboard layouts, however, are available on Android and Linux systems.

=== Alphabet matching table ===
Modern Cyrillic	Latin (1930s)	Cyrillic (1920-30s)	Clear script	Letter name	IPA	Cyrillic transliteration
А а	A a	А а	ᠠ	а	a	A a
Ә ә	Ə ə	Ä ä (1938–41); Я я (1928–30) d (1926–28); Ä ä (1924–26)	—	ә	æ	A̋ a̋
Б б	B в	Б б	ᡋ	бэ	b, bʲ	B b
В в	V v	В в	ᡖ	вэ	v, vʲ	V v
Г г	G g	Г г	ᡙ	гэ	ɡ, ɡʲ, ɢ	G g
Һ һ	H h	Гъ гъ (1938–41); Г г (1928–30); Һ һ (1926–28); Г г (1924–26)	ᡎ	һа	ɣ	Ḥ ḥ
Д д	D d	Д д	ᡑ	дэ	d, dʲ	D d
Е е	E e	Е е	—	е	(j)e	E e*
Ё ё (in Russian loanwords only)	—	—	—	ё	jo	Ë ë**
Ж ж (in Russian loanwords only)	Ƶ ƶ	Ж ж	—	жэ	ʒ	Z̆ z̆
Җ җ	Ƶ ƶ	Дж дж (1938–41); Ж ж (1928–30); Дж дж (1926–28); Ӝ ӝ (1924–26)	ᡚ	җә	ʤ	Z̦̆ z̦̆
З з	Z z	З з	ᡓ	зэ	z	Z z
И и	I i	И и	ᡅ	и	i	I i
Й й	J j	Й й	ᡕ	ахр и	j	J j
К к	K k	К к	ᡘ, ᡗ	кэ	k, kʲ	K k
Л л	L l	Л л	ᠯ	эль	l, lʲ	L l
М м	M m	М м	ᡏ	эм	m, mʲ	M m
Н н	N n	Н н	ᠨ	эн	n, nʲ	N n
Ң ң	Ꞑ ꞑ	Нъ нъ (1938–41); Нг нг (1926–30); Ң ң (1924–26)	ᡊ	аң	ŋ	Ñ ñ
О о	O o	О о	ᡆ	о	o	O o
Ө ө	Ө ө	Ö ö (1938–41); Э э (1928–30) v (1926–28); Ö ö (1924–26)	ᡈ	ө	ø	Ô ô
П п (in Russian loanwords only)	P p	П п	ᡌ	пэ	(p), (pʲ)	P p
Р р	R r	Р р	ᠷ	эр	r, rʲ	R r
С с	S s	С с	ᠰ	эс	s	S s
Т т	T t	Т т	ᡐ	тэ	t, tʲ	T t
У у	U u	У у	ᡇ	у	u	U u
Ү ү	Y y	Ӱ ӱ (1938–41); Ю ю (1926–30); Ӱ ӱ (1924–26)	ᡉ	ү	y	Ù ù
Ф ф (in Russian loanwords only)	F f	Ф ф	—	эф	(f)	F f
Х х	X x	Х х	ᡍ	ха	x, xʲ	H h
Ц ц	C c (1931–38); Ç ç (1930–31)	Ц ц	ᡔ	цэ	ts	C c
Ч ч	Ç ç (1931–38); C c (1930–31)	Ч ч	ᡒ	чэ	tʃ	Č č
Ш ш	Ş ş	Ш ш	ᠱ	ша	ʃ	S̆ s̆
Щ щ (in Russian loanwords only)	—	Щ щ	—	ща	(ɕː)	Ŝ ŝ
Ъ ъ	—	—	—	үзгин нерәдлһн	—	—
Ы ы	—	Ы ы	—	ы	i	Y y
Ь ь	Ь ь	Ь ь	—	җөөлн темдг	ʲ	'
Э э	E e	Э э	ᡄ	э	e	È è***
Ю ю	—	Ю ю	—	ю	jʊ	Û û
Я я	—	Я я	—	я	ja	Â â

* Variably pronounced /je/ regardless of position within a word. Used to represent /e/ after a consonant in native Kalmyk words, while it may occur at the beginning of a word in Russian loanwords only.
** This sound combination exists in native Kalmyk words, but is spelled "йо".
*** Only appears word-initially.

== Grammar ==
Like other Mongolic languages, Kalmyk is an agglutinative, suffixing, and a genderless language. Some aspects of its syntax have been influenced by Russian; for example, relative clauses, traditionally characterized by left-branching and employing a converbial form of a verb (similarly to Japanese), now often use Russian relative pronoun который and thus exhibit right-branching. Other noticeable feature possibly influenced by Russian is frequent usage of future participle as a predicate of a sentence to express future tense. There is little to no suppletion (irregular forms) in verbal inflection and noun conjugation.

=== Nouns ===
Traditionally, Kalmyk cases are said to have three declensions; however, this is mostly due to orthographical peculiarities. Basically, if the word ends in a full vowel and the case ending begins in a vowel, either (1) a prothetic /g/ or /ʁ/ is added or (2) a vowel is deleted from the case ending. This is further demonstrated in the table below.

Kalmyk noun cases
Case	Suffix (Cyrillic)	Suffix (IPA)	Clear Script spelling
nominative	-∅	-∅	-
genitive	-ин; -һин; -н; -а; -ә; -i	-in; -ʁin; -n; -a; -æ; -i	ᡅᡕᡅᠨ (-iyin); ᡎᡅᡕᡅᠨ (-giyin); ᠨ (-n); ᠠᡅ (-ai); ᡅ (-i)
dative	-д; -т	-də; -tə	ᡑᡇ (-du) / ᡑᡉ (-dü) (depending on vowel harmony) ᡐᡇ (-tu) / ᡐᡉ (-tü)
accusative	-иг; -г; ∅	-igə; -gə; ∅	ᡕᡅᡎᡅ (-yigi); ᡎᡅ (-gi); -
ablative	-ас; -әс; -һас; -һәс	-asə; -æsə; -ʁasə; -ʁæsə	ᠠᡃᠰᠠ (-āsa), ᡄᡃᠰᡄ (-ēse) (later spelling, written together with the word); ᡄᡃᡔᡄ (-ēce) (earlier spelling, written separately from the word)
instrumental	-ар; -әр; -һар; -һәр	-ar; -ær; ʁar; ʁær	ᠠᡃᠷ (-ār), ᡄᡃᠷ (-ēr); ᡅᡕᠠᠷ (-iyar) (earlier spelling)
comitative	-та; -тә	-ta; -tæ	ᡐᠠᡅ (-tai); ᡐᡄᡅ (-tei)
directive	-ур; -үр; -һур; -һүр	-ur; -yr; -ʁur; -ʁyr	ᡇᡇᠷ (-uur); ᡇᡇᠷᡇ (-uuru) (earlier spelling; written separately from the word)

- Genitive takes the suffix -ин (-in) in case it is preceded by a consonant; -һин (-ğin) or -н (-n) if it is preceded by a vowel; -ә (-ä), -a or -и (-i) if it is preceded by the /n/ consonant.
- Dative suffix is -т (-t) if preceded by voiced stops /b/ (/β/) /d/ /g/, voiceless sibilants /s/ /ʃ/, and /r/
- Accusative is marked (with a suffix) if the object is definite, unmarked if the object is indefinite
- Nouns ending in -n decline differently. -n is subtracted in the accusative, instrumental, and comitative cases. In all other cases, it is left untouched. For example: kelʲən "language-NOM" kelʲnæ "language-GEN" kelʲəndə "language-DAT" kelʲə/kelʲigə "language-ACC" kelʲnæsə "language-ABL" kelʲær "language-INS" kelʲtæ "language-COM" kelʲnyr "language-DIR"
- Dative also bears the function of lative and locative cases. Its difference with the directive case is not clear, and in some dialects, dative is the prevailing case for lative usage.

== Example text ==
This text is from State Anthem of the Republic of Kalmykia.

Kalmyk in Cyrillic script (modern)	Kalmyk in Cyrillic script (1924-1926)	Kalmyk in Cyrillic script (1926-1928)	Kalmyk in Latin script (1931–1938)	Kalmyk in Latin script (experimental)	English
Сарул сәәхн Хальмг Таңһч Сансн тоотан күцәнә, Авта җирһлин бат җолаг Алдр һартан атхна. Улан залата хальмг улс, Улата теегән кеерүлий! Төрскн нутгтан күчән нерәдәд, Толһа менд җирһий! Олн келн-әмтнлә хамдан Уралан Таңһчин зүткнә Иньгллтин залин өндр герлд Иргч мана батрна. Улан залата хальмг улс, Улата теегән кеерүлий! Төрскн нутгтан күчән нерәдәд, Толһа менд җирһий! Баатр-чиирг үрдәр туурад, Буурл теемг өснә. Сурһуль-номдан килмҗән өдәг, Сул нерән дуудулна. Улан залата хальмг улс, Улата теегән кеерүлий! Төрскн нутгтан күчән нерәдәд, Толһа менд җирһий!	Сарул сääхн Хальмг Таңгч Сансн тоотан күцäнä, Авта ӝирглин бат ӝолаг Алдр гартан атхна. Улан залата хальмг улс, Улата теегäн кеерӱлий! Тöрскн нутгтан кӱчäн нерäдäд, Толга менд ӝиргий! Олн келн-äмтнлä хамдан Уралан Таңгчин зӱткнä Иньгллтин залин öндр герлд Иргч мана батрна. Улан залата хальмг улс, Улата теегäн кеерӱлий! Тöрскн нутгтан кӱчäн нерäдäд, Толга менд ӝиргий! Баатр-чиирг ӱрдäр туурад, Буурл теемг öснä. Сургуль-номдан килмӝäн öдäг, Сул нерäн дуудулна. Улан залата хальмг улс, Улата теегäн кеерӱлий! Тöрскн нутгтан кӱчäн нерäдäд, Толга менд ӝиргий!	Сарул сddхн Хальмг Тангһч Сансн тоотан кюцdнd, Авта джирһлин бат джолаг Алдр һартан атхна. Улан залата хальмг улс, Улата теегdн кеерюлий! Тvрскн нутгтан кючdн нерdдdд, Толһа менд джирһий! Олн келн-dмтнлd хамдан Уралан Тангһчин зюткнd Иньгллтин залин vндр герлд Иргч мана батрна. Улан залата хальмг улс, Улата теегdн кеерюлий! Тvрскн нутгтан кючdн нерdдdд, Толһа менд джирһий! Баатр-чиирг юрдdр туурад, Буурл теемг vснd. Сурһуль-номдан килмджdн vдdг, Сул нерdн дуудулна. Улан залата хальмг улс, Улата теегdн кеерюлий! Тvрскн нутгтан кючdн нерdдdд, Толһа менд джирһий!	Sarul səəxn Xalьmg Taꞑhç Sansn tootan kycənə, Avta ƶirhlin ʙat ƶolag Aldr hartan atxna. Ulan zalata xalьmg uls, Ulata teegən keerylij! Tɵrskn nutgtan kyçən nerədəd, Tolha mend ƶirhij! Oln keln-əmtnlə xamdan Uralan Taꞑhcin zytknə Inьglltin zalin ɵndr gerld Irgç mana ʙatrna! Ulan zalata xalьmg uls, Ulata teegən keerylij! Tɵrskn nutgtan kyçən nerədəd, Tolha mend ƶirhij! Baatr-çiirg yrdər tuurad, Buurl teemg ɵsnə. Surhulь-nomdan kilmƶən ɵdəg, Sul nerən duudulna. Ulan zalata xalьmg uls, Ulata teegən keerylij! Tɵrskn nutgtan kyçən nerədəd, Tolha mend ƶirhij!	Sarul səəhn Haľmg Tañğç Sansn tótan küţənə, Avta cirğlin bat colag Aldr ğartan athna. Ulan zalata haľmg uls, Ulata tégən kérüliy! Törksn nutgtan küçən nerədəd, Tolğa mend cirğiy! Oln keln-əmtnlə hamdan Uralan Tañğçin zütknə Iňgĺtin zalin öndr gerld Irgç mana batrna. Ulan zalata haľmg uls, Ulata tégən kérüliy! Törksn nutgtan küçən nerədəd, Tolğa mend cirğiy! Bátr-çírg ürdər túrad, Búrl témg ösnə. Surğuľ-nomdan kilmcən ödəg, Sul nerən dúdulna. Ulan zalata haľmg uls, Ulata tégən kérüliy! Törksn nutgtan küçən nerədəd, Tolğa mend cirğiy!	Bright and beautiful Kalmyk Republic Fulfills everything it wishes for. It holds in its glorious hands Strong reins of harmonious life. Kalmyks with Ulan-Zala, Let's adorn our natal steppes! Let's devote our power to the homeland, and live long happily! With all the peoples of different languages, The Republic is pushing forward. In the high light of the friendship flame, Our future is getting stronger. Kalmyks with Ulan-Zala, Let's adorn our natal steppes! Let's devote our power to the homeland, and live long happily! Heroic children have succeeded, The steppe has emerged. Putting effort into learning, They're putting up the free name. Kalmyks with Ulan-Zala, Let's adorn our natal steppes! Let's devote our power to the homeland, and live long happily!

== Notes ==
=== Works cited ===
- Номинханов, Ц. Д. (1976). Очерк истории калмыцкой письменности [Essay on the history of Kalmyk writing]. Мoscow: Наука.
