= Coat of arms of Kalmykia =

Emblem of the Republic of Kalmykia
- Armiger: Batu Khasikov, Head of the Republic of Kalmykia
- Adopted: 1996

The coat of arms of the Republic of Kalmykia is a symbol of the Republic of Kalmykia, a federal subject of Russia. It was adopted by the republic's Parliament on 14 June 1996.

== Description ==
The coat of arms represents the image yellow color in a frame of a national ornament on a blue background. Its base depicts petals of a white lotus flower.

== History ==
Emblem of the Kalmyk Autonomous Soviet Socialist Republic
- Armiger: Kalmyk Autonomous Soviet Socialist Republic
- Adopted: 23 June 1937
- Crest: Red star
- Supporters: Wheat and Cotton
- Motto: Цуг-орн нутгудын пролетармуд, негдцхәтн! (Kalmyk) Пролетарии всех стран, соединяйтесь! (Russian) "Workers of the world, unite!"

=== First version ===
On June 23, 1937 the Constitution of the Kalmyk ASSR was adopted. The chapter 10 of the Constitution contained the description of the emblem of Kalmyk ASSR:

The state emblem of the Autonomous Soviet Socialist Republic of Kalmykia is the state emblem of the RSFSR, which consists of an image of a gold sickle and a hammer, a cross placed on a cross, with handles down, a red background in the sun and framed with ears "RSFSR" and "Workers of all countries, unite!" in Russian and Kalmyk languages, with the addition under the inscription "RSFSR" letters of a smaller size of the inscription "Kalmycka ASSR" in Russian and in the Kalmyk languages.

— Constitution of the Kalmyk ASSR (1937), Article 111

=== Second version ===
In 1940, the Kalmyk alphabet was converted from Latin to Cyrillic letters. Based on this change, the inscriptions on the emblem of the Kalmyk ASSR also changed.

The Kalmyk ASSR emblem, which was adopted in the constitution, was identical to the emblem of the RSFSR, but was supplemented by the name of the republic in Russian and in Kalmyk: "КАЛМЫЦКАЯ АССР - ХАЛЬМГ АССР" and the slogan in Kalmyk: "ЦУГОРН-НУТГУДЫН ПРОЛЕТАРМУД, НЕТДЦХӘТН!".

=== Liquidation and restoration of the Kalmyk ASSR ===
From October 1942 until January 1943, a significant part of the territory of the Kalmyk ASSR was occupied by German troops, with whom part of the population cooperated. After the Soviet Army liberated the territory of the Kalmyk ASSR by the bodies of the OGPU and NKVD at the end of 1943, the sweeping false accusations of the entire Kalmyk people were inspired in cooperation with the Nazis, and by the decision of the State Defense Committee of the USSR, all Kalmyk people were deported to Central Asia, the Kalmyk ASSR was abolished, the territory of the former Kalmyk ASSR was included in the Astrakhan Region (part of the territory was included in the Stalingrad Region and the Stavropol Territory), and the city of Elista was renamed Stepnoy.

After the 20th Congress of the CPSU, on November 24, 1956, the Central Committee of the CPSU adopted a resolution "On Restoring the National Autonomy of the Kalmyk, Karachay, Balkar, Chechen and Ingush Peoples", which lifted the indiscriminate accusation of betrayal from the Kalmyk people and the allowance of Kalmyks to return to their former place of residence.

On January 9, 1957, by the decree of the Presidium of the Supreme Soviet of the USSR, the Kalmyk Autonomous Region was reorganized as part of the Stavropol Territory, which was transformed on July 29, 1958 into the Kalmyk ASSR with the restoration of the 1936 Constitution of the Kalmyk ASSR.

=== Third version ===
With the adoption of the new Constitution of the Kalmyk ASSR on May 30, 1978, at the extraordinary 8th session of the Supreme Council of the sixth convocation, the description of the emblem underwent only minor changes. The emblem was described in article 157. The only changes were the addition of a red star in the top, and the motto underwent minor change to "ЦУГ-ОРН НУТГУДЫН ПРОЛЕТАРМУД, НЕГДЦХӘТН!"

== Gallery ==
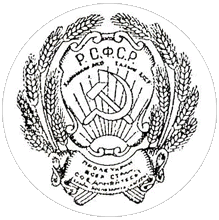
Emblem of the Kalmyk ASSR (1937–1940)

Emblem of the Kalmyk ASSR (1940–1943, 1958–1978)

Emblem of the Kalmyk ASSR (1978–1990), the Kalmyk SSR (1990–1992) and the Republic of Kalmykia (1992–1993)

== See also ==
- Emblem of Mongolia
- Flag of the Republic of Kalmykia
- Anthem of the Republic of Kalmykia

== Sources ==
- Народный Хурал (Парламент) Республики Калмыкия. Закон №44-I-З от 14 июня 1996 г. «О государственных символах Республики Калмыкия», в ред. Закона №152-IV-З от 18 ноября 2009 г. «О внесении изменения в Закон Республики Калмыкия "О государственных символах Республики Калмыкия"». Вступил в силу с момента опубликования. Опубликован: "Ведомости Народного Хурала (Парламента) Республики Калмыкия", №2, стр. 113, 1997. (People's Khural (Parliament) of the Republic of Kalmykia. Law #44-I-Z of June 14, 1996 On the State Symbols of the Republic of Kalmykia, as amended by the Law #152-IV-Z of November 18, 2009 On Amending the Law of the Republic of Kalmykia "On the State Symbols of the Republic of Kalmykia". Effective as of the moment of publication.).
