= KASSR =

KASSR may refer to:

- The Kalmyk Autonomous Soviet Socialist Republic, an autonomous polity of the Russian SFSR
- The Karelian Autonomous Soviet Socialist Republic, an autonomous polity of the Russian SFSR
- The Komi Autonomous Soviet Socialist Republic, an autonomous polity of the Russian SFSR
