= ITIC =

ITIC may mean:

- Intelligence and Terrorism Information Center, an Israeli group
- International Tsunami Information Center, Honolulu is established by the Intergovernmental Oceanographic Commission of UNESCO
- International Tax and Investment Center, whose managing director is Ariel Cohen
- Information Technology Industry Council (abbreviated ITI or ITIC)
- International Teacher Identity Card, a teacher-specific version of International Student Identity Card
