= State Anthem of Kalmykia =

Хальмг Таңһчин частр
English: State Anthem of the Kalmyk Republic
- Sheet music
- Regional anthem of Kalmykia, Russia
- Lyrics: Vera Shugrayeva
- Music: Arkady Mandzhiev
- Adopted: 30 October 1992

Audio sample
- Official orchestral vocal rendition in E major: file; help

Digital instrumental rendition

Short instrumental recording

The State Anthem of the Republic of Kalmykia (Note: Kalmyk: Хальмг Таңһчин частр, romanized: Khalmg Tanghchin chastr, Clear script: ᡍᠠᠯᡅᡏᠠᡎ ᡐᠠᡊᡎᠠᡒᡅ ᡅᠨ ᠱᠠᠰᡐᠠᠷ IPA: [χaʎmə́q tʰaɴʁə̆tɕʰɪ́ɴ tɕʰastʰə́ɾ]) was officially adopted on 30 October 1992. The music was composed by Arkady Mandzhiyev, and the lyrics were written by Vera Shugrayeva.

== History ==
Following the dissolution of the Soviet Union, a competition was announced in the republic to create new state symbols of the Kalmyk Republic. On 30 October 1992, the Supreme Council of the Republic of Kalmykia approved the anthem, along with its flag and coat of arms. The anthem was also approved by the separate Law of the Republic of Kalmykia of 4 November 1992 "On the Supplement of the Constitution (Basic Law) of the Kalmyk SSR Article 158-1".

== Lyrics ==
=== Kalmyk Oirat original ===
Cyrillic script

Сарул сәәхн Хальмг Таңһч
Сансн тоотан күцәнә,
Авта җирһлин бат җолаг
Алдр һартан атхна.

Давтгддг:
Улан залата хальмг улс,
Улата теегән кеерүлий!
(𝄆) Төрскн нутгтан күчән нерәдәд,
Толһа менд җирһий! (𝄇)

Олн-келн әмтнлә хамдан
Уралан Таңһчин зүткнә
Иньгллтин залин өндр герлд
Иргч мана батрна.

Давтгддг

Баатр, чиирг үрдәр туурад,
Буурл теемг өснә.
Сурһуль, номдан килмҗән өдәг,
Сул нерән дуудулна.

Давтгддг

Latin script

Sarul sääkhn Khalmg Tanghch
Sansn tootan kütsänä,
Awta jirhlin bat jolag
Aldr hartan atkhna.

Dawtgddg:
Ulan zalata khalmg uls,
Ulata teegän keerüliy!
(𝄆) Törskn nutgtan küchän nerädäd,
Tolha mend jirhiy! (𝄇)

Oln keln-ämtnlä khamdan
Uralan Tanghchin zütknä
Inglltin zalin öndr gerld
Irgch mana batrna.

Dawtgddg

Baatr-chiirg ürdär tuurad,
Buurl teemg ösnä.
Surhul-nomdan kilmjän ödäg,
Sul nerän duudulna.

Dawtgddg

IPA transcription (Note: See File:Anthem of Kalmykia vocal.ogg, Help:IPA, Kalmyk language § Phonology and Kalmyk language § Alphabet matching table.)

[sa.ɾʊ́l sɛː.χə̠́ɴ χaʎ.mə̠́q tʰaɴ.ʁə̠̆.tɕʰɪ́ |]
[san.sə̠́ɴ tʰɔː.tʰáɴ kʰʏ.tsʰɛ.nɛ́ ǁ]
[af.tʰá dʑɪɾ.ɣə̟.ʎɪ́ɴ | ba.tʰə̠́ dʑɔ.la.ɢə̠́ |]
[al.də̠́ɾ ʁaɾ.tʰáɴ atʰ.χə̠.ná ǁ]

[daf.tʰə̠ɢ.də̠d.ɢə̠́]
[ʊ.láɴ dza.la.tʰá χaʎ.mə̠́q ʊ.lə̠̆.sə̠́ |]
[ʊ.la.tʰá tʰeː.gɛ́ɴ kʰeː.ɾʏ.ʎɪ.jə̟́ ǁ]
(𝄆) [tʰɵɾs.kʰə̟́ɴ nʊ.tʰə̠q.tʰáɴ kʰʏ.tɕʰɛ́ɴ ne.ɾɛ.dɛ́t |]
[tʰɔl.ʁá men.də̟́ dʑɪɾ.ɣɪ.jə̟́ ǁ] (𝄇)

[ɔl.nə̠́ kʰe.ʎɪ́ɴ ɛm.tʰə̟ɲ.ʎɛ́ χam.dáɴ |]
[ʊ.ɾa.láɴ tʰaɴ.ʁə̠̆.tɕʰɪ́ɴ dzʏtʰ.kʰə̟.nɛ́ ‖]
[ɪɲɟ.ʎə̟ʎ.tʰɪ́ɴ dza.ʎɪ́ɴ ɵn.də̟́ɾ ge.ɾə̟.ʎə̟́t]
[ɪ.ɾə̟̆k.tɕʰə̟́ ma.ná ba.tʰə̠ɾ.ná ǁ]

[daf.tʰə̠ɢ.də̠d.ɢə̠́]

[baː.tʰə̠́ɾ tɕʰiː.ɾə̟́k ʏɾ.dɛ́ɾ tʰuː.ɾát |]
[buː.ɾə̠́l tʰeːm.gə̟́ ɵs.nɛ́ ǁ]
[sʊɾ.ʁʊ́ʎ nɔm.dáɴ kʰɪ.ʎə̟̆m.dʑɛ́ɴ ɵ.dɛ.gə̟́ |]
[sʊ.lə̠́ ne.ɾɛ́ɴ duː.dʊl.ná ǁ]

[daf.tʰə̠ɢ.də̠d.ɢə̠́]

In the Clear script:

ᠰᠠᠷᡇᡇᠯ ᠰᠠᡅ᠋ᡍᠠᠨ ᡍᠠᠯᡅᡏᠠᡎ ᡐᠠᡊᡎᠠᡒᡅ
ᠰᠠᠨ ᠰᠠᠨ ᡐᡆᡃᡐᠠᠨ ᡍᡉᡔᡄᠨᡄᡅ᠂
ᠠᡋᡇ ᡐᠠᡅ ᡓᡅᠷᡎᠠᠯ ᡅᠨ ᡋᠠᡐᡇ ᡓᡆᠯᡆᡃᡎᡅ
ᠠᠯᡑᠠᠷ ᡎᠠᠷᡐᠠᡃᠨ ᠠᡐᠠᡍᠠ ᠨᠠ᠃

ᡑᠠᡋᡐᡙᡑᡑᡙ:
ᡇᠯᠠᠠᡃ ᠴᠠᠯᠠᡃ ᡐᠠᡅ ᡍᠠᠯᡅᡏᠠᡎ ᡇᠯᡇᠰ ᡋᡄᡃᠨ᠂
ᡇᠯᠠᡐᠠᡅ ᡐᡄᡅ ᡋᡄᡃᠨ ᡍᡄᠷᡉᡉᠯ ᡅᡎᡅ ᡕᡄᡃᠨ!
(𝄆) ᡐᡈᠷᡈᠰᡍᡈᠨ ᠨᡇᡐᡇᡎᡐᠠᡃᠨ ᡍᡉᡒᡄᡃᠠ ᠨᡄᠷᡄᡐᡄᡅ ᡑᡉ᠂
ᡐᡆᠯᡆᡎᠠᡅ ᡏᡄᠨᡑᡄ ᡓᡅᠷᡎᠠᠠ ᡅᡎᡅ ᡕᡄᡃᠨ! (𝄇)

ᡆᠯᠠᠨ ᡍᡄᠯᡄᠨ-ᡄᡏᡐᡉ ᡋᡄᡃᠨ ᠯᡉᡎᡄᡃ ᡍᠠᡏᡐᡇ ᡋᡄᡃᠨ
ᡇᠷᠠᠯᠠᠨ ᡐᠠᡊᡎᠠᡒᡅ ᡅᠨ ᠴᡉᡐᡄᡍᡄᡅ ᠨᡄ
ᡅᠨᠠᡎᠯᠠᠯ ᡐᡇ ᡅᠨ ᠴᠠᠯᠠ ᡅᠨ ᡈᠨᡑᡈᠷ ᡎᡄᠷᡄᠯ ᡐᡉ
ᡅᠷᡄᡎᡒᡅ ᡏᠠᠨᠠᡅ ᡋᠠᡃ᠊ᡐᡇᠷ ᠨᠠ᠃

ᡑᠠᡋᡐᡙᡑᡑᡙ

ᡋᠠᡃ᠊ᡐᡇᠷ-ᡒᡅᠷᠠᡅ ᡎᡅ ᡉᡉᠷᡄᡃᡑ ᡋᡄᡃᠷ ᡐᡇᡇᠷᠠᡅ ᡑᡇ᠂
ᡋᡇᡇ᠋ᠷᠠᠯ ᡐᡄᡏᡄᡅ ᡎᡅ ᡈᠰᡉᠨ ᡕᡄᡃᠨ᠃
ᠰᡇᠷᡎᡇᡇᠯᡅ-ᠨᡆᡏᡑᠠᡃᠨ ᡍᡅᠯᠠᡏᡓᡅ ᡋᡄᡃᠨ ᡈᡑᡄᡎ᠂
ᠰᡇᠯᠠ ᠨᡄᠷᡄᡃᠨ ᡑᡇᡇ᠋ᡑᡇᡇ᠋ᠯᡇᠨ ᡋᡄᡃᠨ᠃

ᡑᠠᡋᡐᡙᡑᡑᡙ

=== Unofficial translations ===
Russian translation

Светла красива Республика Калмыкия
Всё, что задумала, исполняет,
Складной жизни крепкие поводья
В славной руке сжимает.

Припев:
С красной кисточкой калмыцкий народ,
Красную степь украсим!
(𝄆) Родной державе мощь посвятим,
Да будем здравствовать мы! (𝄇)

Со всеми людьми разных языков вместе
Вперёд стремится моя Республика.
Дружбы пламя в высоком свете
Будущее наше крепнет.

Припев

Прославляясь врепкими детьми,
Седая степь моя растёт.
Отдавая учёбе старание,
Свободное имя возносят.

Припев

English translation

Kalmyk Republic blazing and dazzling
Fulfulling everything it wishes for.
In its glorious hands it carries
Strong reins of life in unison.

Chorus:
With Ulan-Zala are the Kalmyk folk,
Let's adorn our natal steppes!
(𝄆) Let's devote to our homeland our power,
And live long merrily! (𝄇)

Our peoples of different tongues together,
The Republic is striving forth.
In noble incandescence of friendship flare,
Our future is becoming stronger.

Chorus

Glorified by children heroic and lasting,
The olden steppe has emerged.
Pouring diligence into learning,
The free name has been forged.

Chorus

== Regulations ==
The order, place and time of execution of the anthem are defined by the Law of the Republic of Kalmykia of 11 June 1996 No. 44-I-3 "On State Symbols of the Republic of Kalmykia". According to Art. 16 of said Law, the anthem is performed during solemn ceremonies and other events held by state bodies when raising the national flag. After a newly appointed Head takes oath, the anthem is played right after. The anthem can also be played during openings of ceremonial meetings of the Parliament (e.g. People's Khural of Kalmykia) and during openings of memorials and monuments. It can be played during visits by highest officials of Russia (or its federal subjects), the Commonwealth of Independent States, and other countries (after their respective anthems' performances). The Kalmyk anthem is also played while state awards are being presented, and played during the openings and closings of solemn rallies, meetings, in honour of sports teams, and official celebrations. Additionally, the anthem can be played while laying wreaths to the graves of victims of political repression and those killed in the defense of their ethnic homeland.

== See also ==
- Anthem of the Republic of Buryatia
- National anthem of Mongolia
