= Kalmyk Autonomous Soviet Socialist Republic =

Autonomous republic of the Soviet Union (1935-91); now Kalmykia, Russia

Kalmyk Autonomous Soviet Socialist Republic Хальмг ACCP (Oirat) Калмыцкая АССР (Russian)
- ASSR of the Russian SFSR; Republic of the Russian Federation
- 1935–1943; 1958–1992
- Flag (1958–1990) Emblem (1978–1992)

- Location of Kalmyk ASSR within Russian SFSR
- Capital: Elista
- Government
  - Type: Soviet republic
- History
  - Established: 20 October 1935
  - Disestablished: 27 December 1943
  - Re-established: 29 July 1958
  - Sovereignty declared (Renamed to the Kalmyk SSR): 18 October 1990
  - Renamed to the Republic of Kalmykia: 20 February 1992
Preceded by	Succeeded by
Kalmyk AO	Kalmykia
- Today part of: Russia

The Kalmyk Autonomous Soviet Socialist Republic (Russian: Калмыцкая Автономная Советская Социалистическая Республика; Kalmyk: Хальмг Автономн Советск Социалистическ Республик, romanized: Xaľmg Avtonomn Sovetsk Soţialistiçesk Respublik, [xalʲˈmək aftɐˈnomnə sɐˈvʲɛt͡sk sɐt͡sialʲɪsˈtit͡ʃəsk rʲɪsˈpublʲɪk]) was an autonomous republic of the Russian SFSR that existed at two periods of time. Its administrative center was Elista.

The Kalmyk ASSR was first established when the Kalmyk Autonomous Oblast (established 4 November 1920) had its status increased on 22 October 1935. On 27 December 1943 in conjunction with the deportation of over 93,000 Kalmyks to various locations in Central Asia and Siberia, the Kalmyk ASSR was abolished and its territory was split between adjacent Astrakhan, Rostov and Stalingrad Oblasts and Stavropol Krai. Soviet authorities renamed the former republic's towns and villages.

The Kalmyk ASSR was re-established when the newly formed Kalmyk Autonomous Oblast (re-established following the rehabilitation of the Kalmyks in January 1957) had its status increased on 29 July 1958. On 18 October 1990, the declaration of the sovereignty and transformation of Kalmykia into a Soviet Socialist Republic by the Kalmyk Supreme Soviet was accepted by the Congress of People's Deputies of the Russian SFSR on 24 May 1991. It existed until 31 March 1992, when its status was changed to a republic within the Russian Federation.

A minor planet, 2287 Kalmykia, discovered in 1977 by Soviet astronomer Nikolai Stepanovich Chernykh, is named after the Kalmyk ASSR.

== The Russian revolution and the formation of the Kalmyk Autonomous Oblast ==
Astrakhan was the first settlement within Kalmykia to fall to Soviet power on Jan 25, 1918, during the Russian Civil War. The "First Kalmyk Congress of Soviets was held" in Astrakhan from July 1 to 3, 1918. In 1919, control of Kalmykia reverted to the White army, after which Lenin issued a proclamation “to the Kalmyk people to fight against the White guards”. Control reverted to the Bolsheviks in 1920.

The creation of Kalmykia as an autonomous oblast emerged from the First All-Kalmyk Congress of Soviets from July 2 to 9, 1920 in Chilgir. Kalmykia officially became an Autonomous Oblast on November 4, 1920 "by a decree of the All Russian Central Executive Committee and the Council of People's Commissars." What entailed was a resettlement of Kalmyks to the newly formed autonomous oblast with the goal of the native population being incorporated "in a single administrative unit" from 1922 to 1925.

== Formation of the Kalmyk Autonomous Soviet Socialist Republic ==
"On May 6, 1927, the Council of People's Commissars decreed the transfer of the administrative center of Kalmykia from Astrakhan to Elista. In October 1935 the Kalmyk Autonomous Oblast was transformed into an Autonomous Soviet Socialist Republic (ASSR). In 1937 the Supreme Soviet of the Kalmyk ASSR adopted a constitution for the republic that reflected the victory of socialist relations. The Kalmyk people were consolidated into a socialist nation."

== Kalmyk language, literacy and education ==
Resulting from the First All-Kalmyk Congress of Soviets, the Congress discussed the creation and organization of primary and secondary education within the newly formed Autonomous Oblast (Reznik, 64). From 1924 to 1939, the Kalmyk writing system incurred various changes (Reznik, 64). School textbooks were to be initially published in Kalmyk, but were instead published in Russian in the haste to combat the high rate of illiteracy in 1923 (Reznik, 64). The Zaya Pandita alphabet was adapted to create a Russian transcription, which was then disregarded in favour of Cyrillic in 1924 (Reznik, 64–65).

Despite this, according to the 1926 All-Union census, the Kalmyk Autonomous Oblast had a total literacy rate of only 17.3% (Reznik, 67). Ultimately, the process of eliminating literacy was to be conducted through Russian as opposed to native Kalmyk (Reznik, 66). In the 1930s, the alphabet underwent Latinization from Cyrillic as part of the attempt to unify all alphabets within the Soviet Union (Reznik, 68). Although this correlated with the increased amount of published Kalmyk language works and a literacy rate of 70.8% among Kalmyk population aged over nine. This is to be seen as a part of larger "campaign in 1931 that became the main driving behind the growth of literacy numbers in Kalmykia," in which the driving force was the actual number, and aggressiveness of educators attempting to spread literacy, rather than the campaign itself. (Reznik, 70).

In conjunction with the 1943 deportations of Kalmyks, Reznik suggests that the alterations to the Kalmyk alphabet "broke the intergenerational continuity of language transmission (70)." There were ultimately few native Kalmyk speakers to teach Kalmyk (70).

== See also ==
- Deportation of the Kalmyks
- Kalmyk Regional Committee of the Communist Party of the Soviet Union
