= Kalmyk Regional Committee of the Communist Party of the Soviet Union =

The First Secretary of the Kalmyk regional branch of the Communist Party of the Soviet Union was the position of highest authority in the Kalmyk AO (1920–1935, 1957–1958) and the Kalmyk ASSR (1935–1943, 1958–1991) in the Russian SFSR of the Soviet Union. The position was created on February 20, 1921, and abolished in August 1991. The First Secretary was a de facto appointed position usually by the Politburo or the General Secretary himself.

== List of First Secretaries of the Communist Party of Kalmykia ==
Name	Term of Office		Life years
Name	Start	End	Life years
First Secretaries of the Communist Party
Arashi Chapchayev	February 20, 1921	August 11, 1921	1890–1938
Ivan Marbush-Stepanov	August 14, 1921	October 1923	
Trofim Borisov	October 1923	May 1925	1891–1943
Ivan Glukhov	May 1925	November 17, 1927	1892–1962
Khokhol Dzhalykov	November 19, 1927	January 6, 1934	1887–1938
Andzhur Pyurbeyev	January 10, 1934	November 30, 1935	1904–1938
Ivan Karpov	November 30, 1935	February 28, 1939	1892–?
Pyotr Lavrentyev	February 28, 1939	February 27, 1943	
Aleksandr Likomidov	February 27, 1943	December 1943	
Post abolished (December 1943 – December 1956)
Nikolay Zhezlov	December 16, 1956	February 1959	1910–1985
Mikhail Ponomaryov	February 1959	August 1961	1918–2001
Basan Gorodovikov	August 1961	December 20, 1978	1910–1983
Vladimir Nikulin	December 20, 1978	December 20, 1985	1929–
Vladimir Zakharov	December 20, 1985	September 25, 1990	1936–
Boris Muyev	October 27, 1990	August 1991	1942–

== See also ==
- Kalmyk Autonomous Soviet Socialist Republic

== Sources ==
- World Statesmen.org
