= Kalmykian Cavalry Corps =

Military unit

Doctor Doll Kalmyk Formation
- Kalmücken Verband Dr. Doll; Доктор Доллин Хальмг мөртә церг
- Active: 1942–1945
- Country: Nazi Germany
- Branch: German Army
- Role: Cavalry
- Size: 5,000
- Colors: Red, gold
- Engagements: World War II

The Kalmykian Cavalry Corps (German: Kalmücken-Kavallerie-Korps; also known as: German: Kalmücken Verband Dr. Doll, Oirat: Доктор Доллин Хальмг мөртә церг, romanized: Doktor Dollin Xalmg mörtä tserg, [ˈdoktər ˈdolin xɑlʲˈmək mœrˈtæ t͡sɛˈrək], Dr. Doll Kalmyk Formation (Dr. Doll was an alias of Otto Werba)) was a unit of about 5,000 ethnic Kalmyk volunteers who chose to join the German Army in 1942 rather than remain in Kalmykia as German forces retreated before the Red Army. Stalin subsequently declared the Kalmyk population as a whole to be German collaborators in 1943 and ordered mass deportations to Siberia, inflicting great loss of life.

== Origins ==
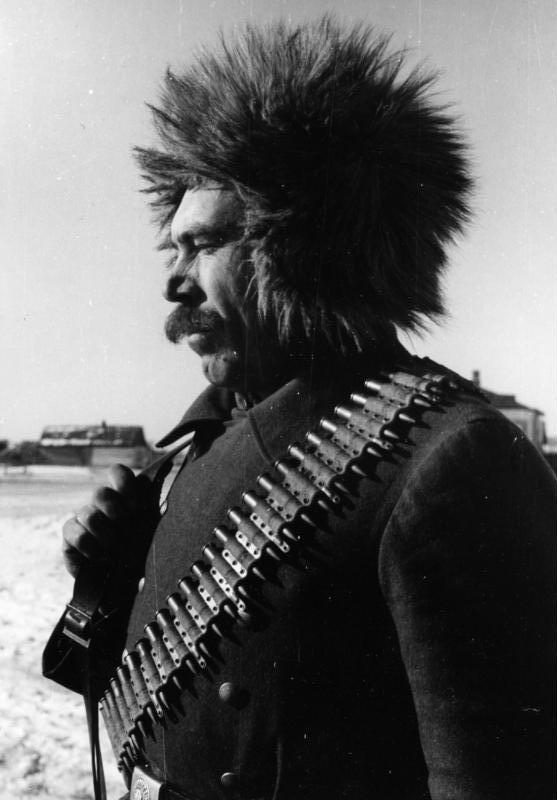
Kalmyk volunteer in the service of the Wehrmacht.

When Erich von Manstein led the 16th Motorized Infantry Division into Kalmykia in early 1942 he already had some Kalmyk advisors from a committee drawn together by Goebbels for propaganda purposes. These were supplemented by other Kalmyks who had settled in Belgrade following their flight with White Russian emigres after the Russian October Revolution.

== Organization ==
The KKK acted within the German Wehrmacht as an independent allied force with all leadership positions taken by Kalmyks. Most of the officers were Kalmyks themselves with previous Soviet military experience. A few Germans that were present within the corps performed only auxiliary and administrative functions.

== Military actions ==
The Kalmykian Cavalry Corps fought with the Wehrmacht behind the lines, especially around the Azov Sea. At the end of 1944, the surviving Kalmyk cavalry troops, together with their families, retreated with the German army. About 2,000 went to Silesia, Poland and 1,500 to Zagreb, Croatia, where they were reorganized to fight against the partisans.

== End of the war ==
After the war, nearly all of the surviving Kalmyk soldiers along with the Kalmyk families that accompanied them were forcibly repatriated to the Soviet Union.

Despite the fact that 23,750 Kalmyks served in the Red Army during World War II, the Kalmykian people were internally deported for 13 years as collective punishment for the actions of the Kalmykian Cavalry Corps.

== See also ==
- Tiger Legion
- Turkic, Caucasian, Cossack, and Crimean collaborationism with the Axis powers
