= Flag of Kalmykia =

Kalmykia
- Proportion: 1:2
- Adopted: 30 July 1993
- Design: Yellow field with a sky blue circle in the center containing a lotus
- Designed by: Bata Erdneev
- Flag of the Kalmyk ASSR
- Proportion: 1:2
- Adopted: 29 July 1958
- Design: Variant of the flag of the Russian SFSR with "Kalmyk ASSR" written in the Russian and Kalmyk languages below the hammer and sickle.

The flag of Kalmykia (Note: Russian: Государственный Флаг Республики Калмыкия, Oirat: Хальмг Таңһчин Орн-нутгин туг) consists of a yellow field with a sky blue circle in the center containing a lotus. The yellow stands for the sun and the Tibetan Buddhist faith of the Kalmyk people. The blue represents the eternal blue sky and steadiness. The lotus is a symbol of purity, spiritual rebirth and happiness. Its five upper petals represent the continents and the lower four stand for the quarters of the globe. Together, they symbolize the will of the Kalmyks to live in friendship and to cooperate with all the nations of the world.

The current flag of Kalmykia also has some similarities with the flags of Kazakhstan and Palau since 30 July 1993.

The first post soviet flag of Kalmykia (1992–1993) was adopted by law of 30 October 1992. (Source: Government of the Republic of Kalmykia)

Article 158: The National flag of the Republic of Kalmykia — Khalmg Tangch is a rectangular panel consisting of three horizontal stripes: the upper one is sky-blue, the middle one is golden-yellow and the lower one is scarlet. In the centre of the golden-yellow stripe, in a circle having a diameter equal to 1/4 of the flag width, is a sign in the form of flame of fire over the two wavy lines. The sign and the circumference are scarlet. The ratio of the width of the stripes of light blue and scarlet to the width of the golden-yellow stripe is 1:2. The ratio of the flag width to its length is 1:2.

== Flags ==
=== Historical flags ===
Flag	Date	Use	Description
	1630–1771	Flag of the Kalmyk Khanate	
	1937–1938	Flag of the Kalmyk Autonomous Soviet Socialist Republic	
	1938–1943	Flag of the Kalmyk Autonomous Soviet Socialist Republic	
	1957–1958	Kalmyk Autonomous Oblast	The Kalmyk Autonomous Oblast doesn't have a flag of its own.
	1958–1992	Flag of the Kalmyk Autonomous Soviet Socialist Republic	
	1992–1993	Flag of Kalmykia	
	2022	Oirat-Kalmyk People's Congress	On 27 October 2022, the Congress published a declaration of independence of Kalmykia and proclaimed the creation of an independent Kalmyk state.
	2022	Alternative flag used by Oirat-Kalmyk People's Congress	

=== Other flags ===
Flag	Date	Use	Description
	?–present	Flag of Elista	
	?–present	Flag of Chernozemelsky District	
	?–present	Flag of Oktyabrsky District	
	?–present	Flag of Tselinny District	

== See also ==
- Flag of Agin-Buryat Okrug
- Flag of Buryatia
- Flag of Mongolia
- Flag of Tuva
- Flag of Ust-Orda Buryat Okrug
