= Zaya Pandita =

Buddhist priest (1599–1662)

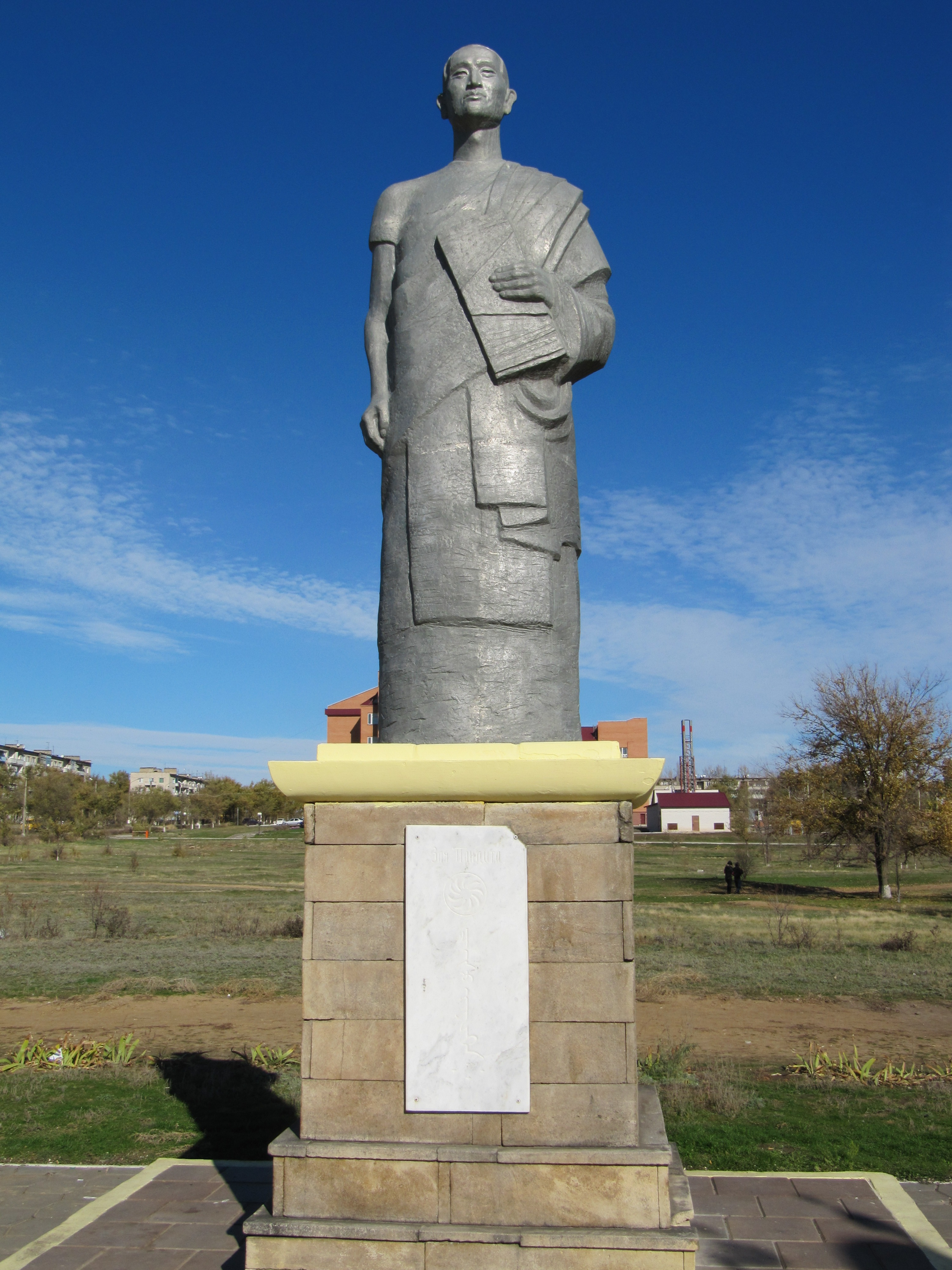
Statue of Zaya Pandita. Elista, Kalmykia.

Zaya Pandita Namkhaijamts (Mongolian: Зая Бандида Намхайжамц, 1599–1662) was a Mongolian Tibetan Buddhist missionary priest and scholar of Oirat origin who is the most prominent Oirat Buddhist scholar. Among his accomplishments is the invention of the Clear Script.

== Biography ==
Zaya Pandita was the fifth son of Babakhan, a minor Khoshut prince. After Babakhan converted to Tibetan Buddhism in the early 17th century, he, like many other Oirat princes, wished for one of his sons to enter the Buddhist clergy. In pursuit of his wish, Babakhan chose Zaya to become a śrāmaṇera ("novice monk"). In 1615, Zaya journeyed to Lhasa where he would study and practice Buddhism, including study under the guidance of the Lobsang Chökyi Gyaltsen, 4th Panchen Lama.

In 1638, Zaya Pandita left Tibet at the direction of the Panchen Lama to conduct missionary work among the Mongols. One year later in 1640, he assisted Erdeni Batur, Khong Tayiji of the Choros tribe, in assembling a pan-Mongol conference between the Oirat and the Khalkha Mongols. The purpose of the conference was to encourage the formation of a united Mongolian front against potential external enemies, such as the Kazakhs, Manchus, and Russians and to settle all internal matters peacefully. The conference produced a code, which provided protection from foreign aggression to both the Oirat and the Khalkha and guaranteed the free movement of people throughout Mongol land.

When not engaged in diplomacy between the Oirat and the Khalkha, Zaya Pandita spread Tibetan Buddhism to the Oirats, the Khalkha and even the Kalmyk people in far away Russia. In furtherance of his missionary work, Zaya Pandita composed a new alphabet, based on the traditional Mongolian alphabet, called "Clear script" (Todo bichig) to transcribe the Oirat language as it is pronounced. By doing so, Zaya Pandita eliminated the ambiguities of the traditional Mongolian alphabet.

From the time Zaya Pandita developed the Clear Script in 1648 until his death in 1662, he translated approximately 186 Buddhist texts from Tibetan language to the Oirat language while still serving the religious needs of the Oirat tribes in Dzungaria.

The Clear script is still used by Oirats in Xinjiang with slight revisions, and is taught alongside standard classical written Mongolian in that region.
