= Ariel Cohen =

Israeli political scientist

- Born: Yalta, Soviet Union

Ariel Cohen is a political scientist focusing on political risk, international security and energy policy, and the rule of law. Cohen currently serves as the managing director of the Energy, Growth, and Security Program] (EGS) at the International Tax and Investment Center (ITIC), an independent, nonprofit research and education organization founded in 1993 to promote tax reform and public-private initiatives to improve the investment climate in transition and developing economies.

He is also a nonresident senior fellow in the Eurasia Center at the Atlantic Council. Until July 2014, Cohen was a senior research fellow at The Heritage Foundation in Washington, D.C. He specializes in Russia, Eurasia, Eastern Europe, and the Middle East.

== Early life and education ==
Cohen was born in Yalta, Soviet Union. In 1986, he graduated from Bar-Ilan University's law school in Tel Aviv, Israel with an L.L.B. He received an M.A. in Law and Diplomacy in 1989, and a Ph.D. from Fletcher School of Law and Diplomacy in 1993.

== Career ==
Cohen has testified before committees of the U.S. Congress, including the Senate and House Foreign Relations Committees, the House Armed Services Committee, the House Judiciary Committee, and the Helsinki Commission. He served as a policy adviser with the National Institute for Public Policy's Center for Deterrence Analysis. Cohen has consulted for USAID, the World Bank, and the Pentagon.

Cohen testified in favor of the use of fossil fuels at the Hearing of the Committee on the Budget, “Denial, Disinformation, and Doublespeak: Big Oil’s Evolving Efforts to Avoid Accountability for Climate Change” on May 1, 2024.

Cohen is a writer and commentator in the American and international media. He has appeared on CNN, NBC, CBS, FOX, C-SPAN, BBC-TV and Al Jazeera English, and Russian and Ukrainian national TV networks. He was a commentator on a Voice of America weekly radio and TV show for eight years. He is a contributing editor to The National Interest and a blogger for Voice of America.

He has written guest columns for The New York Times, International Herald Tribune, The Christian Science Monitor, The Washington Post, The Wall Street Journal, The Washington Times, EurasiaNet, Valdai Discussion Club, and National Review Online. In Europe, Cohen's analyses have appeared in Kommersant, Izvestiya, Hurriyet, the popular Russian website Ezhenedelny Zhurnal, and many others.

Cohen has written on financial corruption and foreign policy in Russia, and on U.S. security issues.

== Select Bibliography ==
=== Books ===
- The Russian Military and the Georgia War: Lessons and Implications (with Robert E. Hamilton and Strategic Studies Institute), (Military Bookshop, 2011) ISBN 978-1780395135
- Kazakhstan: The Road to Independence (Central Asia Caucasus Institute, 2008, paperback) ISBN 978-9185937363
- Kazakhstan: Energy Cooperation with Russia - Oil, Gas and Beyond (GMB Publishing, 2006, paperback) ISBN 978-1905050413
- Eurasia in Balance (Ashgate, 2005, hardcover), ISBN 978-0754644491
- Russian Imperialism: Development and Crisis (Praeger, 1996 – hardcover, 1998-paperback), ISBN 978-0275964818

=== Essays ===
- "Russian Missiles to Syria Endanger U.S. Foreign Policy Goals", The Heritage Foundation, May 29, 2013
- "How More Economic Freedom Will Attract Investment to Kazakhstan and Central Asia", The Heritage Foundation, June 26, 2012
- "Reset Regret: Heritage Foundation Recommendations", The Heritage Foundation, August 5, 2011
- “Central Asian Terrorism: An Emerging Threat to U.S. Security” with Morgan Roach, The Heritage Foundation, June 13, 2011
- “Turkey after the Elections: Implications for U.S. Foreign Policy” with Sally McNamara, The Heritage Foundation, June 8, 2011

=== Testimonies ===
- "Time to Pause the Reset? Defending U.S. Interests in the Face of Russian Aggression", Foreign Affairs Committee, U.S. House of Representatives, July 7, 2011
- "European and Eurasian Energy: Developing Capabilities for Security and Prosperity, Subcommittee on Europe and Eurasia", Foreign Affairs Committee, U.S. House of Representatives, June 2, 2011
- "Foreign Policy and National Security Implications of Oil Dependence", Foreign Affairs Committee, U.S. House of Representatives, March 22, 2007

== Current Appointments ==
- Member, Council on Foreign Relations
- Member, American Council on Germany
