= Kalmyk Autonomous Oblast =

Autonomy of the Kalmyk people in the Russian SFSR

Kalmyk Autonomous Oblast Калмыцкая автономная область (Russian) Хальмг Автономн Таңhч (Oirat)
- Autonomous oblast of the Russian SFSR
- 1920–1935; 1957–1958
- Capital: Astrakhan (1920–1928); Elista (1928–1935; 1957–1958)
- History
  - Established: 1920
  - Disestablished: 1958
- Today part of: Kalmykia

Kalmyk Autonomous Oblast (AO) (Russian: Калмыцкая автономная область; Kalmyk: Хальмг Автономн Таңhч, Xaľmg Awtonomn Tañhç) was an autonomy of the Kalmyk people within the Russian SFSR that existed at two separate periods.

It was first established in November 1920. Its administrative center was Astrakhan. In June 1928, it was included into Lower Volga Krai. In January 1934, Lower Volga Krai was split into Saratov Krai and Stalingrad Krai, and Kalmyk AO was included as a part of the latter. In October 1935, Kalmyk AO was raised in status and became the Kalmyk ASSR (abolished in 1943).

Kalmyk Autonomous Oblast was re-established again in January 1957, this time as part of Stavropol Krai. In 1958, it was raised in status, becoming the Kalmyk ASSR, and separated from Stavropol Krai.

== Population ==
According to the 1920 census, 126,256 people lived on the region's territory, including 124,501 rural and 1,655 urban inhabitants. At the same time, the predominant population was Kalmyks - 84,950 people, Russians, according to the census, numbered 40,034 people, the rest - Ukrainians, Tatars, Kirghiz, and others.

- Kalmyks - 67.28%
- Russians - 31.7%
- Others - 1%
- Rural - 98.6%
- Urban - 1.31%
