= 2024 Kalmyk head election =

Russian local election

- 6–8 September 2024
- Turnout: 61.32%
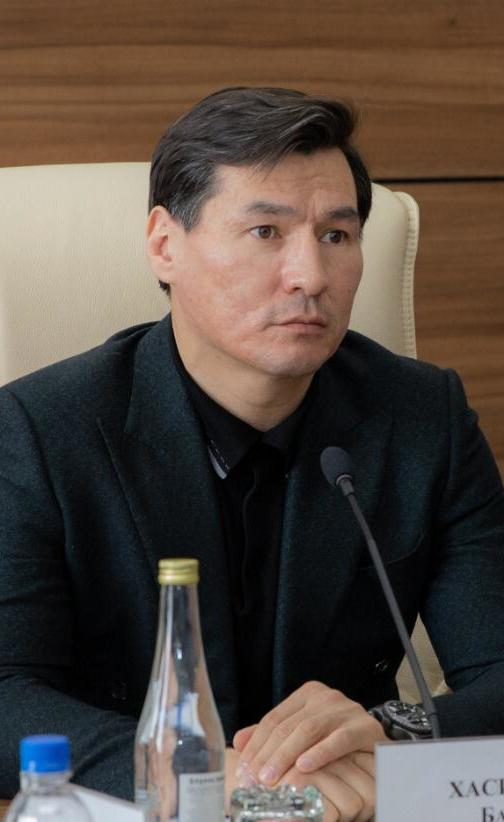
		CPRF	NL
Candidate	Batu Khasikov	Mikhail Namruyev	Aysa Bayanova
Party	United Russia	CPRF	New People
Popular vote	99,864	11,389	7,311
Percentage	79.95%	9.12%	5.85%
Head before election
Batu Khasikov
United Russia
Head-elect
Batu Khasikov
United Russia

The 2024 Republic of Kalmykia head election took place on 6–8 September 2024, on common election day. Incumbent Head Batu Khasikov was re-elected to a second term in office.

== Background ==
Former Federation Council member (2012–2014) and professional kickboxer Batu Khasikov was appointed acting Head of Kalmykia in March 2019. He overwhelmingly won the subsequent general election in September 2019 with 82.54% of the vote. Khasikov also appointed his predecessor, Aleksey Orlov, to the Federation Council after the election.

Khasikov's first term was tumultuous as already in September–October 2019, mere weeks after Khasikov's election, protests swept through the republic as people opposed the appointment of Orlov to the Federation Council and nomination of DNR official Dmitry Trapeznikov as Mayor of Elista. Despite the protests, the nominations were never withdrawn. In October 2020 leaders of three factions in the People's Khural of Kalmykia – Communist Party, A Just Russia and, even, United Russia – wrote an open letter to President Vladimir Putin, where they accused Khasikov of mishandling of COVID-19 pandemic, lack of support for farmers, and general negligence.

In the 2021 Russian legislative election United Russia underperformed in Kalmykia as the party lost 18 points compared to 2016 election. Nevertheless, Khasikov was able to get his ally Badma Bashankayev a seat in the State Duma, who in turn in the primaries defeated incumbent Marina Mukabenova, who was viewed as potential replacement for Khasikov. Batu Khasikov also strengthened his positions after the 2023 Kalmykia parliamentary election, when United Russia retained its majority winning 23 out of 27 seats, and, importantly for Khasikov, when his critics, like former United Russia faction leader Saglar Bakinova, lost their seats in the Khural.

In May 2024 during a meeting with President Vladimir Putin Head Khasikov announced his intention to run for a second term and received Putin's endorsement.

== Candidates ==
In the Republic of Kalmykia candidates for Head can be nominated only by registered political parties. Candidate for Head of the Republic of Kalmykia should be a Russian citizen and at least 30 years old. Candidates for Head should not have a foreign citizenship or residence permit. Each candidate in order to be registered is required to collect at least 9% of signatures of members and heads of municipalities. Also head candidates present 3 candidacies to the Federation Council and election winner later appoints one of the presented candidates.

In late April 2024 People's Khural of Kalmykia made amendments to the electoral law, lowering the municipal filter from 9% to 7%.

=== Declared ===
Candidate name, political party		Occupation	Status	Ref.
Aysa Bayanova; New People		Gymnasium deputy principal	Registered	
Batu Khasikov; United Russia	Batu Khasikov	Incumbent Head of the Republic of Kalmykia (2019–present)	Registered	
Yury Khrushchev; Liberal Democratic Party		Coordinator of LDPR regional office (2021–present)	Registered	
Mikhail Namruyev; Communist Party		Former Advisor to the Prime Minister of Kalmykia (2017–2018)	Registered	
Natalya Manzhikova; SR–ZP		Member of People's Khural of Kalmykia (2018–present); 2019 head candidate	Did not file	

=== Candidates for Federation Council ===
Incumbent Senator Aleksey Orlov (United Russia) was not renominated.

Head candidate, political party	Candidates for Federation Council	Status
Aysa Bayanova; New People	* Yelena Badmayeva, HR inspector * Ivan Pavin, unemployed * Aldar Sangadzhiyev, individual entrepreneur	Registered
Batu Khasikov; United Russia	* Boris Khachirov, Member of People's Khural of Kalmykia (2023–present), businessman * Badma Salayev, Member of People's Khural of Kalmykia (2013–present), Rector of Kalmyk State University (2011–present) * Bulat Sarayev, Minister of Health of Kalmykia (2022–present)	Registered
Yury Khrushchev; Liberal Democratic Party	* Yekaterina Shakhanova, unemployed * Nikolay Shcherbakov, unemployed * Yelena Sushko, technician	Registered
Mikhail Namruyev; Communist Party	* Migmir Bembeyeva, former Member of People's Khural of Kalmykia (2018–2023) * Pyotr Erendzhenov, Member of People's Khural of Kalmykia (2023–present) * Sergey Tsymbalov, former Member of People's Khural of Kalmykia (2018–2023)	Registered

== Finances ==
All sums are in rubles.

Financial Report	Source	Bayanova	Khasikov	Khrushchev	Manzhikova	Namruyev
First		101,640	25,102,000	497,700	3,000	102,140
Final		111,640	40,102,000	701,604	3,000	802,140

== Results ==
Summary of the 6–8 September 2024 Kalmyk head election results
Candidate	Party	Votes	%
Batu Khasikov (incumbent)	United Russia	99,864	79.95
Mikhail Namruyev	Communist Party	11,389	9.12
Aysa Bayanova	New People	7,311	5.85
Yury Khrushchev	Liberal Democratic Party	5,073	4.06
Valid votes		123,637	98.98
Blank ballots		1,272	1.02
Total		124,909	100.00
Turnout		124,909	61.32
Registered voters		203,704	100.00

Head Khasikov appointed People's Khural of Kalmykia member Boris Khachirov (United Russia) to the Federation Council, replacing incumbent Senator Aleksey Orlov (United Russia).

== See also ==
- 2024 Russian regional elections
