= 2023 Kalmykia People's Khural election =

- 8–10 September 2023
- Turnout: 42.01%
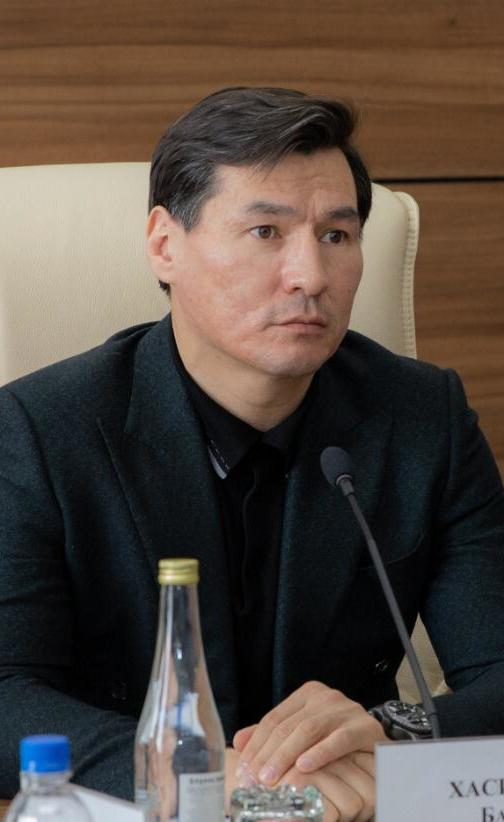

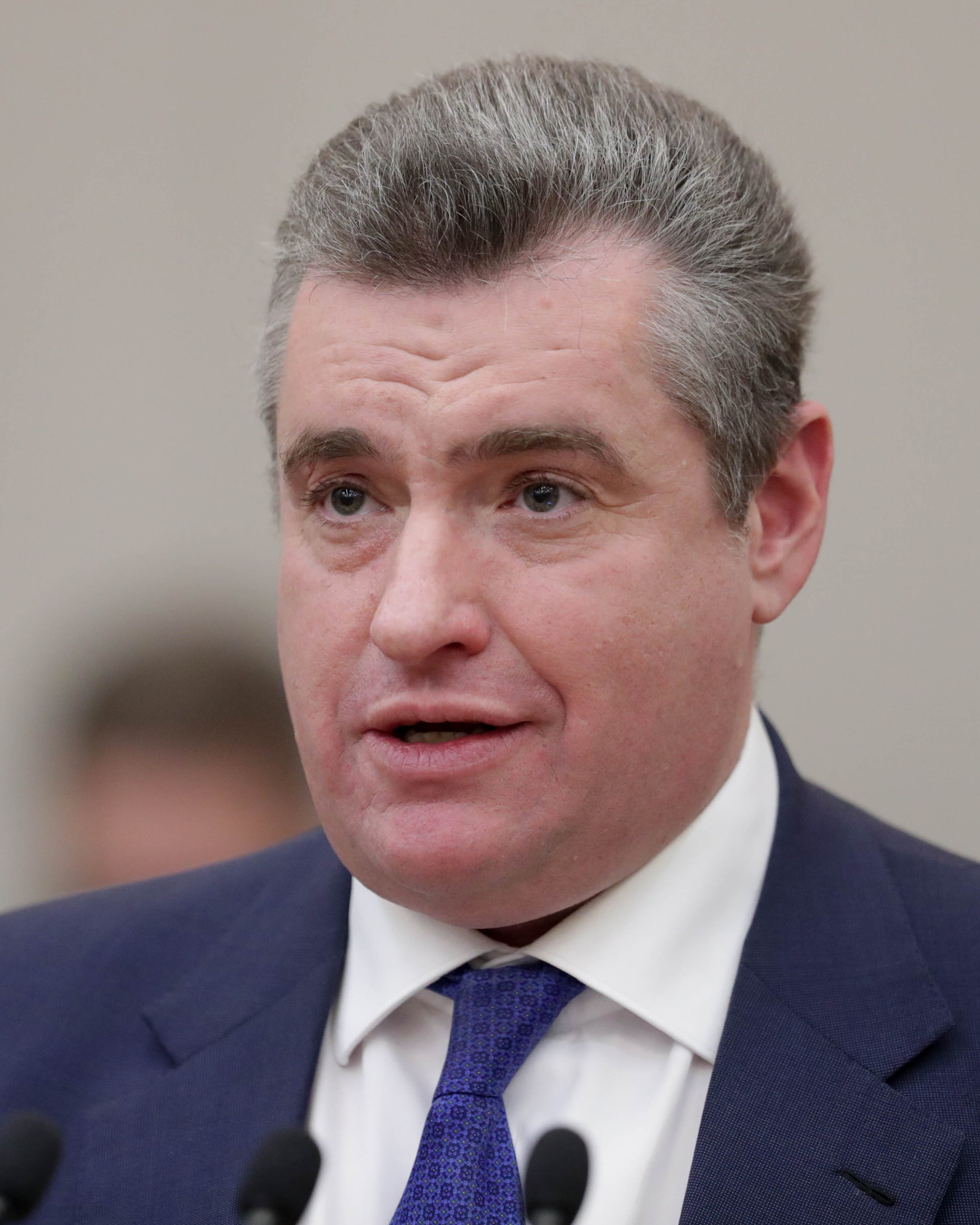
	Majority party	Minority party	Third party
		CPRF	NL
Candidate	Batu Khasikov	Nikolay Nurov	Gilyana Vankayeva
Leader	Dmitry Medvedev	Gennady Zyuganov	Aleksey Nechayev
Party	United Russia	CPRF	New People
Last election	21 seats, 68.52%	4 seats, 13.23%	Did not exist
Seats won	23	2	1
Seat change	▲2	▼2	Did not exist
Popular vote	54,064	11,231	7,048
Percentage	64.17%	13.33%	8.37%
Swing	▼4.35%	▲0.10%	Did not exist
	Fourth party	Fifth party	Sixth party
	SR-ZP		RPSS
Candidate	Natalya Manzhikova	Leonid Slutsky	Vladimir Bambayev
Leader	Sergey Mironov	Leonid Slutsky	Konstantin Rykov
Party	SR-ZP	LDPR	RPSS
Last election	2 seats, 8.45%	0 seats, 3.43%	Did not participate
Seats won	1	0	0
Seat change	▼1	Steady	Did not participate
Popular vote	4,405	3,048	1,316
Percentage	5.23%	3.62%	1.56%
Swing	▼3.22%	▲0.19%	Did not participate

The 2023 People's Khural of Kalmykia election took place on 8–10 September 2023, on common election day. All 27 seats in the People's Khural were up for reelection.

== Electoral system ==
From 2008 until 2023 elections to the People's Khural of Kalmykia were held only using party-list proportional representation with 7%, and later 5% threshold. However Head of Kalmykia Batu Khasikov proposed adopting a parallel voting system in February 2023, which was approved by the Khural. Under current election laws, the People's Khural is elected for a term of five years, with parallel voting. 10 seats are elected by party-list proportional representation with a 5% electoral threshold, with the other half elected in 17 single-member constituencies by first-past-the-post voting. Seats in the proportional part are allocated using the Imperiali quota, modified to ensure that every party list, which passes the threshold, receives at least one mandate.

== Candidates ==
=== Party lists ===
To register regional lists of candidates, parties need to collect 0.5% of signatures of all registered voters in Kalmykia.

The following parties were relieved from the necessity to collect signatures:

- United Russia
- Communist Party of the Russian Federation
- A Just Russia — Patriots — For Truth
- Liberal Democratic Party of Russia
- New People
- Party of Growth
- Russian Party of Freedom and Justice

№	Party	Republic-wide list	Candidates	Territorial groups	Status
1	United Russia	Batu Khasikov • Valery Ochirov • Yelena Lotnik	88	17	Registered
2	Communist Party	Nikolay Nurov • Pyotr Erendzhenov • Migmir Bembeyeva	60	17	Registered
3	New People	Gilyana Vankayeva • Aldar Sangadzhiyev • Gadzhi Feroyan	39	17	Registered
4	RPSS	Vladimir Bambayev • Dzhamba Bogdayev • Marina Misyura	37	17	Registered
5	Party of Growth	Artyom Daginov • Basana Soyatiyeva • Vitaly Mamyshev	37	17	Registered
6	A Just Russia – For Truth	Natalya Manzhikova	32	13	Registered
7	Liberal Democratic Party	Leonid Slutsky • Pyotr Vyshkvarok • Vyacheslav Beloshitsky	54	17	Registered

New People, Party of Growth and Russian Party of Freedom and Justice will take part in Kalmykian legislative election for the first time. Patriots of Russia, who participated in the last election, had been dissolved prior, while Civic Platform, Rodina and The Greens did not file.

=== Single-mandate constituencies ===
17 single-mandate constituencies were formed in Kalmykia. To register candidates in single-mandate constituencies need to collect 3% of signatures of registered voters in the constituency.

Number of candidates in single-mandate constituencies
Party	Candidates	
Party	Nominated	Registered
United Russia	17	17
Communist Party	17	17
A Just Russia — For Truth	15	13
Liberal Democratic Party	17	17
New People	16	16
Party of Growth	2	2
RPSS	17	17
Party of Pensioners	1	1
Independent	1	0
Total	103	100

== Results ==
=== Results by party lists ===
Summary of the 8–10 September 2023 People's Khural of the Republic of Kalmykia election results
Party	Party list					Constituency		Total	
Party	Votes	%	±pp	Seats	+/–	Seats	+/–	Seats	+/–
United Russia	54,064	64.17	▼4.35%	6	▼15	17	—	23	▲2
Communist Party	11,231	13.33	▲0.10%	2	▼2	0	—	2	▼2
New People	7,048	8.37	New	1	New	0	New	1	New
A Just Russia — For Truth	4,405	5.23	▼3.22%	1	▼1	0	—	1	▼1
Liberal Democratic Party	3,048	3.62	▲0.19%	0	Steady	0	—	0	Steady
Russian Party of Freedom and Justice	1,316	1.56	New	0	New	0	New	0	New
Party of Growth	645	0.77	New	0	New	0	New	0	New
Party of Pensioners	—	—	—	—	—	0	New	0	New
Invalid ballots	2,491	2.96	▲0.76%	—	—	—	—	—	—
Total	84,248	100.00	—	10	▼17	17	▲17	27	Steady
Turnout	84,248	42.01	▼12.02%	—	—	—	—	—	—
Registered voters	200,525	100.00	—	—	—	—	—	—	—

Freshman deputy and former school principal Artyom Mikhaylov (United Russia) was elected Chairman of the People's Khural, replacing retiring incumbent Anatoly Kozachko (United Russia), who led the chamber since 2008. United Russia initially selected retired Air Force Lieutenant General Valery Ochirov (United Russia / Independent) for replacement of the retiring Senator Alexei Mayorov (United Russia), however, Ochirov's nomination was stalled and United Russia faction leader Bayir Puteyev was appointed to the Federation Council in early November 2023.

=== Results in single-member constituencies ===
==== District 1 ====
Summary of the 8–10 September 2023 Kalmykia People's Khural election in District 1
Candidate	Party	Votes	%
Chimid Dzhangayev	United Russia	1,151	41.02%
Oksana Sandzhinova	Communist Party	471	16.79%
Yury Khrushchev	Liberal Democratic Party	384	13.68%
Nikolay Gilyandikov	A Just Russia – For Truth	275	9.80%
Svetlana Sangadzhiyeva	Russian Party of Freedom and Justice	268	9.55%
Total		2,806	100%

==== District 2 ====
Summary of the 8–10 September 2023 Kalmykia People's Khural election in District 2
Candidate	Party	Votes	%
Gilyana Ayusheva	United Russia	1,420	46.33%
Oleg Baldashinov	Communist Party	633	20.65%
Tatyana Medvedeva	New People	364	11.88%
Narn Ochirov	Russian Party of Freedom and Justice	239	7.80%
Vladimir Vorontsov	Liberal Democratic Party	198	6.46%
Total		3,065	100%

==== District 3 ====
Summary of the 8–10 September 2023 Kalmykia People's Khural election in District 3
Candidate	Party	Votes	%
Zulta Tsekirov	United Russia	1,267	36.32%
Danara Shalkhanova	Communist Party	611	17.52%
Sanal Bovayev	Party of Pensioners	368	10.55%
Gerlya Shavaliyeva	New People	286	8.20%
Artyom Vyshkvarok	Liberal Democratic Party	234	6.71%
Vladimir Bambayev	Russian Party of Freedom and Justice	233	6.68%
Pavel Manzhikov	A Just Russia – For Truth	171	4.90%
Artyom Daginov	Party of Growth	109	3.13%
Total		3,488	100%

==== District 4 ====
Summary of the 8–10 September 2023 Kalmykia People's Khural election in District 4
Candidate	Party	Votes	%
Badma Salayev	United Russia	2,209	60.19%
Naran Mandzhiyev	New People	407	11.09%
Andrey Matsakov	Communist Party	311	8.47%
Lidia Kukenova	A Just Russia – For Truth	244	6.65%
Chingis Badmayev	Liberal Democratic Party	162	4.41%
Baatr Matsakov	Russian Party of Freedom and Justice	156	4.25%
Total		3,670	100%

==== District 5 ====
Summary of the 8–10 September 2023 Kalmykia People's Khural election in District 5
Candidate	Party	Votes	%
Ochir Khalgayev	United Russia	1,398	41.57%
Boris Boleyev	Communist Party	471	14.01%
Tegryash Chuguyeva	New People	471	14.01%
Natalya Manzhikova	A Just Russia – For Truth	367	10.91%
Nikolay Shcherbakov	Liberal Democratic Party	186	5.53%
Dzhamba Bodgayev	Russian Party of Freedom and Justice	119	3.54%
Araltan Mandzhikov	Party of Growth	95	2.82%
Total		3,363	100%

==== District 6 ====
Summary of the 8–10 September 2023 Kalmykia People's Khural election in District 6
Candidate	Party	Votes	%
Oleg Pyurbeyev	United Russia	1,474	38.15%
Sergey Tsymbalov	Communist Party	611	15.81%
Yelizaveta Paskenova	New People	561	14.52%
Lyudmila Kashiyeva	A Just Russia – For Truth	386	9.99%
Yulia Badmayeva	Liberal Democratic Party	268	6.94%
Bata Tsedenov	Russian Party of Freedom and Justice	195	5.05%
Total		3,864	100%

==== District 7 ====
Summary of the 8–10 September 2023 Kalmykia People's Khural election in District 7
Candidate	Party	Votes	%
Artyom Mikhaylov	United Russia	4,428	71.92%
Matvey Nurov	Communist Party	602	9.78%
Ivan Arzayev	A Just Russia – For Truth	372	6.04%
Nadezhda Bryukhanova	New People	274	4.45%
Gennady Namsinov	Liberal Democratic Party	169	2.74%
Roman Azimov	Russian Party of Freedom and Justice	126	2.05%
Total		6,157	100%

==== District 8 ====
Summary of the 8–10 September 2023 Kalmykia People's Khural election in District 8
Candidate	Party	Votes	%
Ais Nikitin	United Russia	2,664	60.96%
Viktor Kabakov	Communist Party	487	11.14%
Namsyr Nayminov	New People	345	7.89%
Mingiyan Dzhungurov	A Just Russia – For Truth	248	5.68%
Maria Sushko	Liberal Democratic Party	234	5.35%
Tsagan Tsuryumova	Russian Party of Freedom and Justice	161	3.68%
Total		4,370	100%

==== District 9 ====
Summary of the 8–10 September 2023 Kalmykia People's Khural election in District 9
Candidate	Party	Votes	%
Vyacheslav Badmayev	United Russia	2,893	69.91%
Vladimir Dordzhiyev	Communist Party	483	11.67%
Baira Bembeyeva	New People	246	5.94%
Sergey Pristayev	A Just Russia – For Truth	197	4.76%
Vyacheslav Beloshitsky	Liberal Democratic Party	87	2.10%
Tsagana Chadlayeva	Russian Party of Freedom and Justice	81	1.96%
Total		4,138	100%

==== District 10 ====
Summary of the 8–10 September 2023 Kalmykia People's Khural election in District 10
Candidate	Party	Votes	%
Mikhail Bogatov	United Russia	5,471	77.31%
Baatar Bogoldykov	Communist Party	613	8.66%
Saglar Ochkayeva	Liberal Democratic Party	348	4.92%
Anna Bocharnikova	A Just Russia – For Truth	327	4.62%
Yekaterina Kukayeva	New People	174	2.46%
Tseren Lidzhiyev	Russian Party of Freedom and Justice	56	0.79%
Total		7,077	100%

==== District 11 ====
Summary of the 8–10 September 2023 Kalmykia People's Khural election in District 11
Candidate	Party	Votes	%
Valery Boldyrev	United Russia	4,912	79.21%
Badma Kekveyev	Communist Party	655	10.56%
Yury Moiseyev	Liberal Democratic Party	241	3.89%
Kermen Basangova	Russian Party of Freedom and Justice	182	2.94%
Aysa Kitidova	New People	106	1.71%
Total		6,201	100%

==== District 12 ====
Summary of the 8–10 September 2023 Kalmykia People's Khural election in District 12
Candidate	Party	Votes	%
Lag Sangadzhiyev	United Russia	6,435	76.38%
Oleg Petkeyev	Communist Party	846	10.04%
Boris Khamayev	A Just Russia – For Truth	710	8.43%
Olga Shalburova	New People	139	1.65%
Gilyana Erdniyeva	Russian Party of Freedom and Justice	79	0.94%
Sergey Shpirkin	Liberal Democratic Party	45	0.53%
Total		8,425	100%

==== District 13 ====
Summary of the 8–10 September 2023 Kalmykia People's Khural election in District 13
Candidate	Party	Votes	%
Lidzhi Amikov	United Russia	2,830	61.58%
Lyudmila Namruyeva	Communist Party	783	17.04%
Boris Todayev	A Just Russia – For Truth	325	7.07%
Tsagan Kenzeyeva	New People	199	4.33%
Sandzhi Kalyayev	Liberal Democratic Party	139	3.02%
Yelena Nayminova	Russian Party of Freedom and Justice	95	2.07%
Total		4,596	100%

==== District 14 ====
Summary of the 8–10 September 2023 Kalmykia People's Khural election in District 14
Candidate	Party	Votes	%
Grigory Tsebekov	United Russia	1,990	54.52%
Valery Yelynko	Liberal Democratic Party	593	16.25%
Galina Sanzhiyeva	A Just Russia – For Truth	491	13.45%
Artyom Erdniyev	Communist Party	308	8.44%
Aldar Sangadzhiyev	New People	107	2.93%
Aryuna Sangadzhiyeva	Russian Party of Freedom and Justice	40	1.10%
Total		3,650	100%

==== District 15 ====
Summary of the 8–10 September 2023 Kalmykia People's Khural election in District 15
Candidate	Party	Votes	%
Mikhail Kokayev	United Russia	6,150	88.44%
Tseden Konayev	Communist Party	335	4.82%
Boris Muzrayev	A Just Russia – For Truth	150	2.16%
Saglara Kalyayeva	Liberal Democratic Party	125	1.80%
Sanal Muchiryayev	New People	92	1.32%
Sanal Namysov	Russian Party of Freedom and Justice	31	0.45%
Total		6,954	100%

==== District 16 ====
Summary of the 8–10 September 2023 Kalmykia People's Khural election in District 16
Candidate	Party	Votes	%
Yelena Lotnik	United Russia	5,441	85.28%
Gilyana Badmayeva	Communist Party	314	4.92%
Artyom Kolodko	Liberal Democratic Party	254	3.98%
Kirsan Badmayev	Russian Party of Freedom and Justice	213	3.34%
Vasily Skvortsov	New People	74	1.16%
Total		6,380	100%

==== District 17 ====
Summary of the 8–10 September 2023 Kalmykia People's Khural election in District 17
Candidate	Party	Votes	%
Aleksandr Azdorov	United Russia	3,185	74.07%
Aleksandr Polyakov	Communist Party	590	13.72%
Vera Yeremina	Liberal Democratic Party	181	4.21%
Natalia Bazyuk	New People	117	2.72%
Olga Prokopenko	Russian Party of Freedom and Justice	86	2.00%
Total		4,300	100%

== See also ==
- 2023 Russian regional elections
