= Boris Khachirov =

Russian politician

- Борис Хачиров
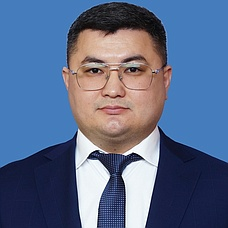

Senator of the Russian Federation from Kalmykia
- Incumbent
- Assumed office 22 September 2024
- Preceded by: Aleksey Orlov

Personal details
- Born: Boris Bekmuratovich Khachirov
- Education: Stavropol State University; Russian Presidential Academy of National Economy and Public Administration

Boris Bekmuratovich Khachirov (Russian: Борис Бекмуратович Хачиров; born 14 November 1986) is a Russian politician. He has served as a senator of the Russian Federation, representing the executive authority of Kalmykia, since 22 September 2024. Since October 2025, he has been a member of the Federation Council Committee on Agrarian and Food Policy and Environmental Management.

== Early life and education ==
Khachirov was born on 14 November 1986 in the settlement of Partizansky, Priozyorny District, Kalmyk ASSR (the settlement is now Gashun-Burgusta in Ketchenerovsky District, Kalmykia).

In 2004, he received pedagogical training at the Elista Pedagogical College named after Kh. B. Kanukov, specialising in physical education. In 2009, he graduated from Stavropol State University, where he obtained qualifications as a lawyer, life-safety teacher and physical education teacher. In 2014, he completed a master's degree in state and municipal administration at the Russian Presidential Academy of National Economy and Public Administration.

== Business and public activity ==
Before entering regional politics, Khachirov was involved in business. He worked as development director of Kalmagroinvest LLC and as deputy director for commercial affairs at All Tactical Combat LLC. In April 2020, the regional news agency RIA Kalmykia described him as an entrepreneur from Stavropol who, during the COVID-19 pandemic, donated a batch of antiseptic supplies to healthcare institutions in Kalmykia.

In 2024, Vedomosti reported that Khachirov's public activity in Kalmykia was connected with social initiatives, assistance to people in the zone of the Russian invasion of Ukraine, and the introduction of an irrigation and land-improvement system based at Kalmagroinvest

In 2024, while already a deputy of the People's Khural, Khachirov took part in deliveries of aid to participants in the Russian invasion of Ukraine: he delivered food supplies, off-road vehicles, FPV drones and other equipment. In September 2024, on the instructions of the head of Kalmykia, Batu Khasikov, Khachirov delivered humanitarian cargo to the city of Antratsyt in the Luhansk People's Republic after fires in Antratsyt District.

Since September 2024, he has served as vice-president of the Chess Federation of Kalmykia. In this capacity, he took part in chess events in Kalmykia, including the "Move of Victory" tournament at the chess club of Sergey Karjakin and the first Buddhist chess tournament, "Spirit of Dharma".

== People's Khural of Kalmykia ==
From 2023 to 2024, he was a deputy of the People's Khural of Kalmykia of the seventh convocation. He was elected on 10 September 2023 as part of the republican list of candidates nominated by United Russia; he ran as number 5 in regional group No. 16 and was a member of the party's faction in the regional parliament. He served as deputy chair of the People's Khural committee on industry, construction, housing and communal services, energy, transport and communications.

In 2024, Khachirov proposed establishing a public holiday in Kalmykia, the Day of the Kalmyk language and National Script. It was proposed that the holiday be observed on 5 September. On 31 October 2024, the People's Khural unanimously supported the initiative, and the Day of the Kalmyk Language and National Script received the status of a republican holiday.

== Federation Council ==
In July 2024, the head of Kalmykia, Batu Khasikov, who had been registered as a candidate for a new term, presented three candidates for the post of his representative in the Federation Council: Badma Salayev, rector of Kalmyk State University; Kalmykia's health minister Bulat Sarayev; and Boris Khachirov. The incumbent senator from the region's executive authority, former head of Kalmykia Aleksey Orlov, was not included in the three-name list.

On 20 September 2024, after Khasikov was re-elected head of Kalmykia, a decree was signed appointing Khachirov as senator of the Russian Federation, representing the executive authority of the Republic of Kalmykia. He replaced Orlov, who had represented Kalmykia's executive authority in the Federation Council since 2019. In a Vedomosti article, political analyst Vitaly Ivanov described Khachirov as a candidate closer to Khasikov's team and linked him to incumbent senator Bayir Puteyev, noting that Khachirov had been involved in agricultural business in Priyutnensky District, whose administration Puteyev headed from 2020 to 2022.

Initially, Khachirov joined the Federation Council Committee on Social Policy. On 8 October 2025, he was transferred to the Federation Council Committee on Agrarian and Food Policy and Environmental Management.

In the Federation Council, Khachirov worked on issues related to agriculture, irrigation, desertification and electricity grid infrastructure. In 2025, the regional newspaper Stepnye Vesti reported on his proposal to increase compensation for hydromelioration works in Kalmykia from 50% to 70%, linking the measure to desertification, pasture degradation and the fodder base for livestock farming. In 2025 and 2026, he also participated in discussions on the development of the wool market and organised trading in wool raw materials in Kalmykia.

In April 2026, Khachirov, together with senators Andrey Kutepov and Ivan Abramov, introduced bill No. 1201787-8 in the State Duma to amend the Code of the Russian Federation on Administrative Offenses, increasing fines for violations related to damage to electricity grids and unauthorised connection to them.

In December 2025, Khachirov was elected to the presidium of the regional political council of United Russia in Kalmykia.
