= Bayir Puteyev =

Russian politician

- Байир Путеев
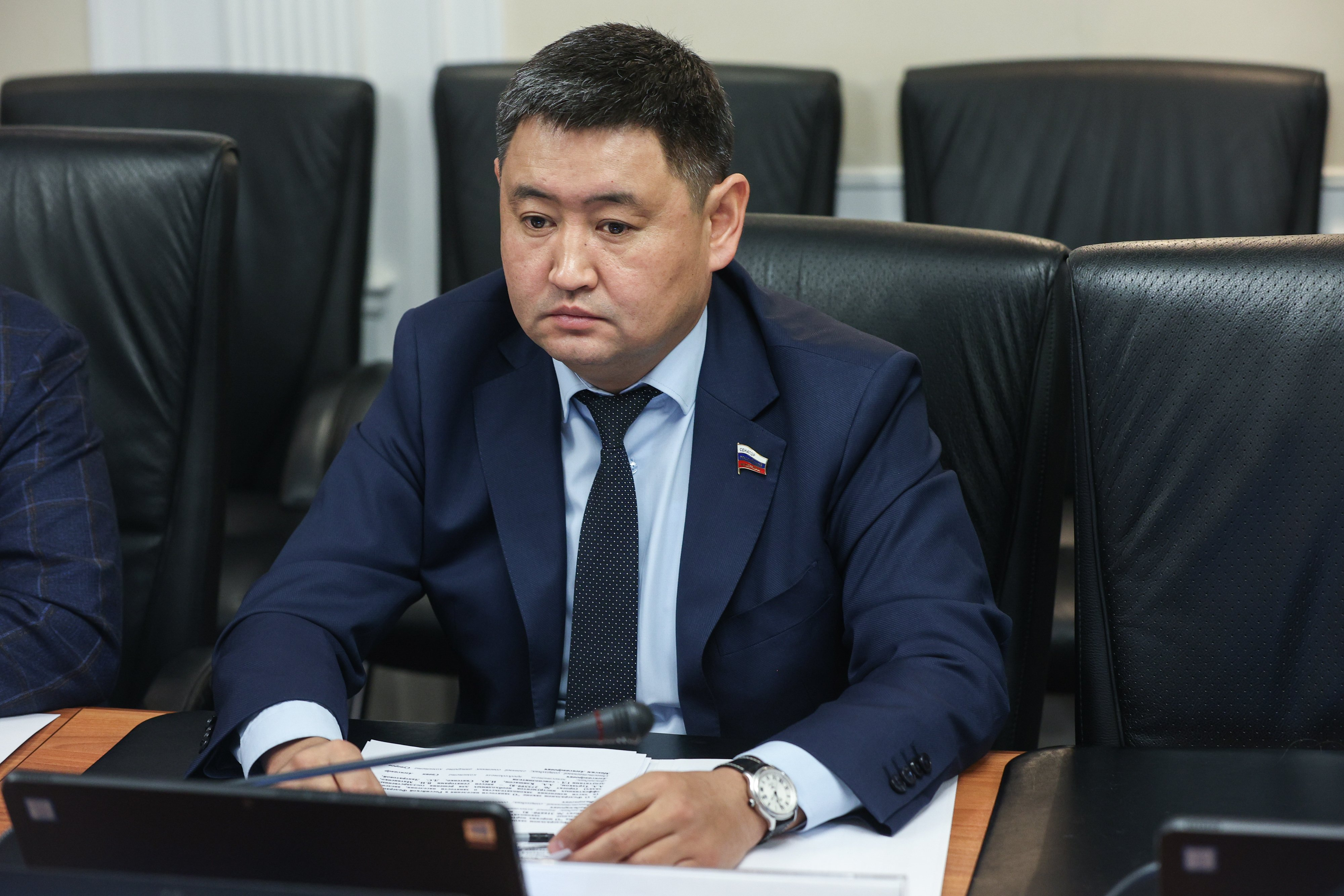

Senator of the Russian Federation from Kalmykia
- Incumbent
- Assumed office 7 November 2023
- Preceded by: Alexei Mayorov

Personal details
- Born: 23 January 1986 (age 40) Iki-Burul, Kalmyk ASSR, Russian SFSR, Soviet Union
- Party: United Russia
- Children: 2
- Education: Kalmyk State University

Bayir Eduardovich Puteyev (Note: Also transliterated as Bair Puteev.) (Russian: Байир Эдуардович Путеев; born 23 January 1986) is a Russian politician serving as a senator of the Russian Federation from the legislative authority of Kalmykia since 7 November 2023. He is a member of the Federation Council Committee on the Rules of Procedure and Parliamentary Governance. Earlier in his career, he headed Priyutnensky District, served as deputy chairman of the People's Khural of Kalmykia, and became first deputy secretary and head of the regional executive committee of United Russia in Kalmykia.

== Early life and education ==
Puteyev was born on 23 January 1986 in Iki-Burul, Iki-Burulsky District, in the Kalmyk ASSR. According to Puteyev, his father worked as a shepherd and his mother as a milkmaid. After his mother's death, he moved with his grandmother to Pervomaysky in Priyutnensky District.

In 2008, he graduated from Kalmyk State University with a qualification as a history teacher.

== Agriculture and municipal career ==
After graduating from university, Puteyev worked in agricultural organizations in Priyutnensky District. From October 2008 to November 2009, he was a production-site foreman at the Lenkom agricultural consumer service cooperative in Pervomaysky, and from November 2009 to February 2013 he headed the cooperative. From 2013 to 2016, he worked as a machine operator at the Pervomaysky agricultural production cooperative.

In 2018, Puteyev moved to the administration of Priyutnensky District. From March to September 2018, he was chief specialist for youth affairs, sport and culture. From September 2018 to September 2019, he was deputy head of the district administration for social affairs. In February 2020, he was elected head of Priyutnensky District. He held the post until March 2022.

From December 2013, Puteyev was a member of the Public Youth Chamber under the People's Khural of Kalmykia, and from January 2014 he was a member of the Council of Young Legislators under the South Russian Parliamentary Association.

== United Russia and People's Khural ==
In March 2022, after Batu Khasikov was elected secretary of United Russia's regional branch in Kalmykia, Puteyev moved from municipal administration into the party apparatus. He became first deputy secretary of the branch and head of its regional executive committee, and joined the presidium of the regional political council.

In September 2023, Puteyev was elected to the People's Khural of Kalmykia on the United Russia party list, heading regional candidate group No. 7. In October and November 2023, he served as deputy chairman of the People's Khural and as leader of the United Russia faction in the regional parliament.

== Federation Council ==
On 7 November 2023, deputies of the People's Khural of Kalmykia vested Puteyev with the powers of a senator of the Russian Federation representing the region's legislative authority. His candidacy was proposed by the chairman of the People's Khural, Artyom Mikhailov, and he was the only candidate. Twenty-five of the 26 deputies present voted for him. He replaced Alexei Mayorov, who had represented Kalmykia's legislative authority in the Federation Council.

Since November 2023, Puteyev has been a member of the Federation Council Committee on the Rules of Procedure and Parliamentary Governance. On 8 November 2023, he took part in his first Federation Council sitting after receiving his senatorial mandate.

In the Federation Council, Puteyev has taken part in discussions on regional issues related to infrastructure, ecology and the agro-industrial sector of Kalmykia. In 2024 and 2025, regional media reported his participation in events related to the development of the agro-industrial sector, the construction of the Verkhny Yashkul–Elista water pipeline, and the problem of accumulated waste in the region.

== Personal life ==
Puteyev is married and has two children.
