= 2026 Saint Petersburg legislative election =

Regional legislative election in Russia

- 18–20 September 2026

All 50 seats in the Legislative Assembly 26 seats needed for a majority
- Turnout: 55.20% ▲19.68 pp
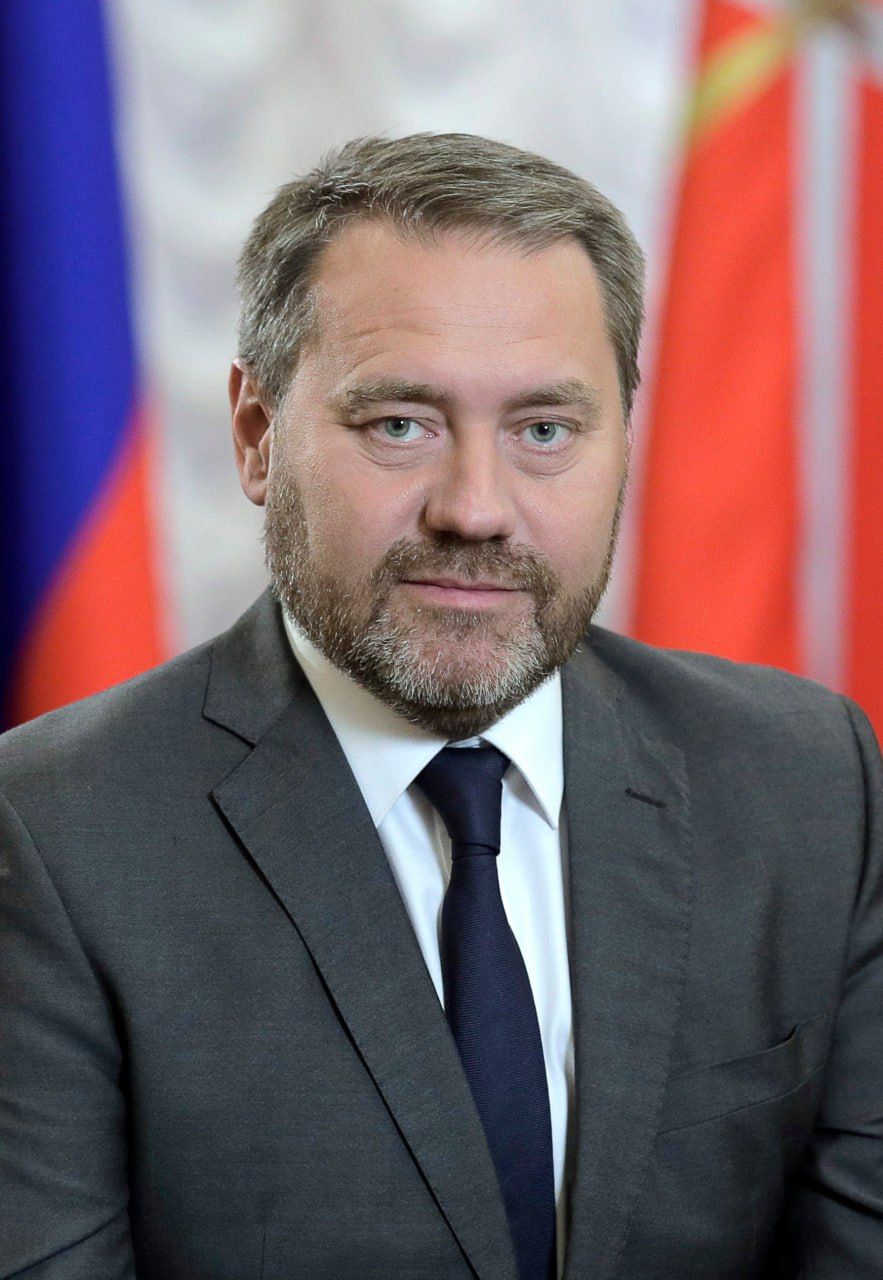

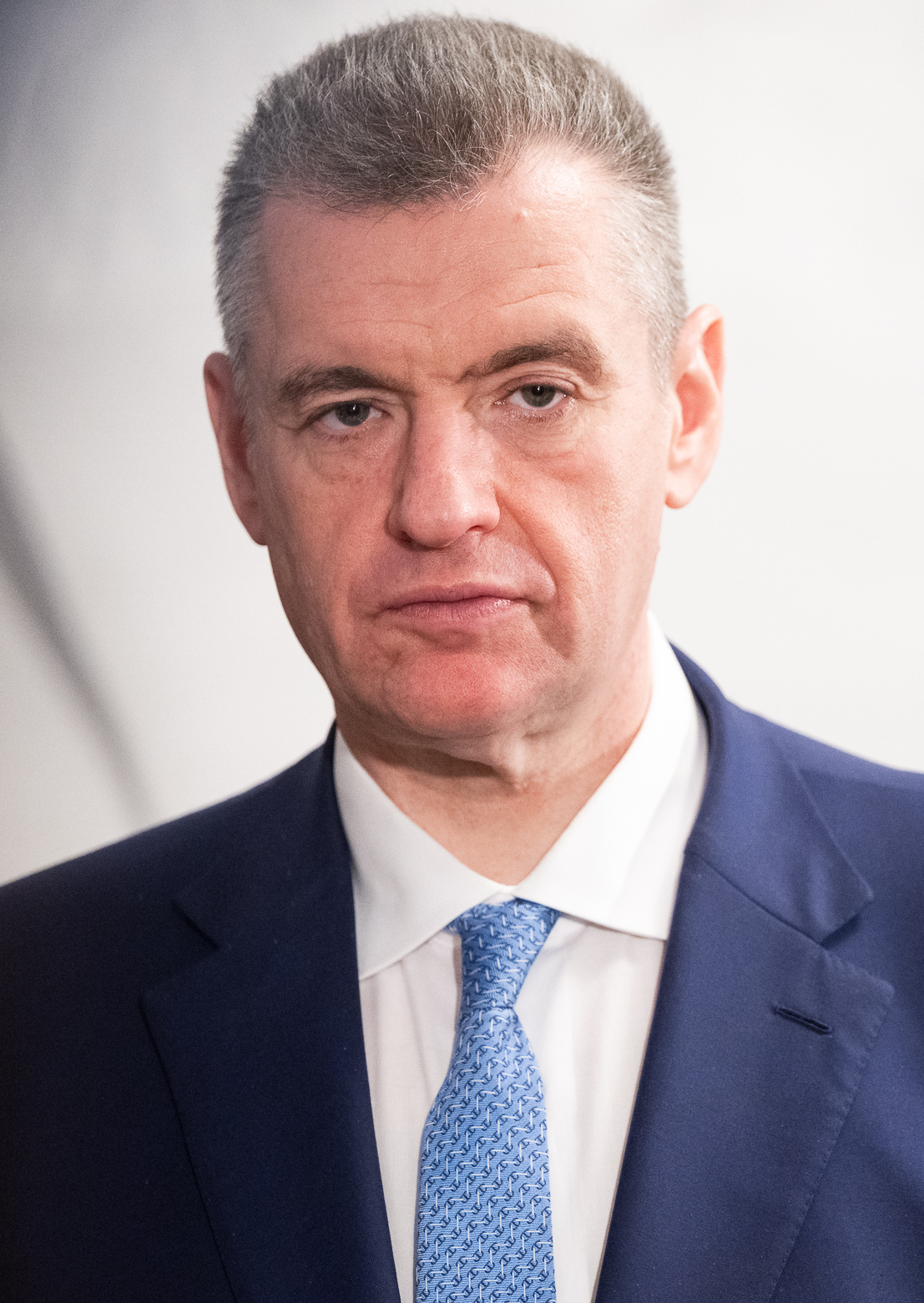

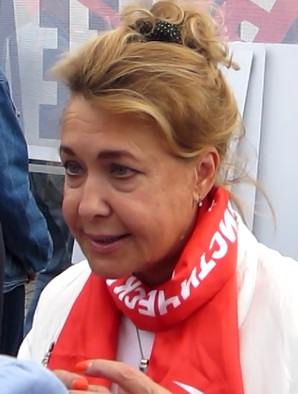

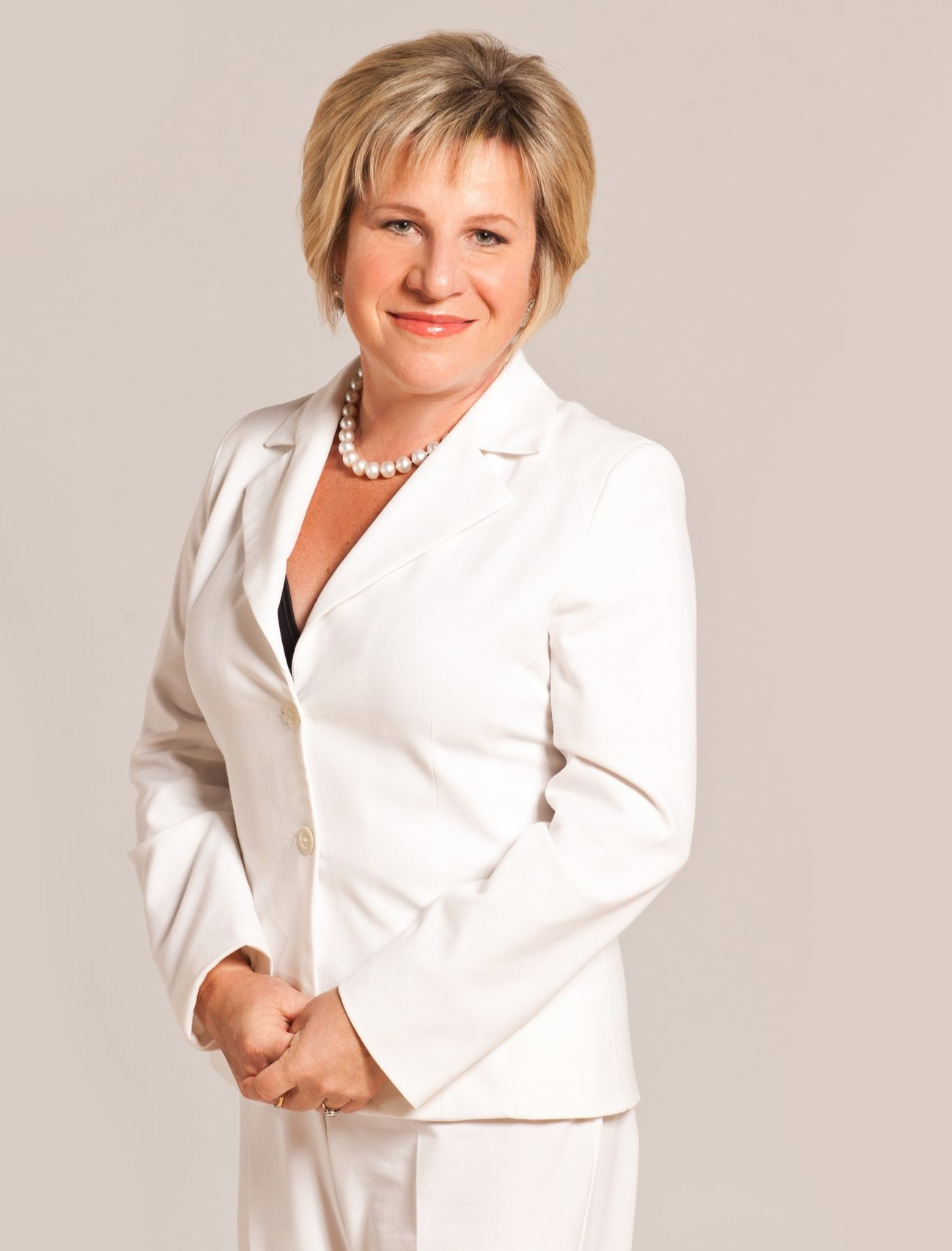

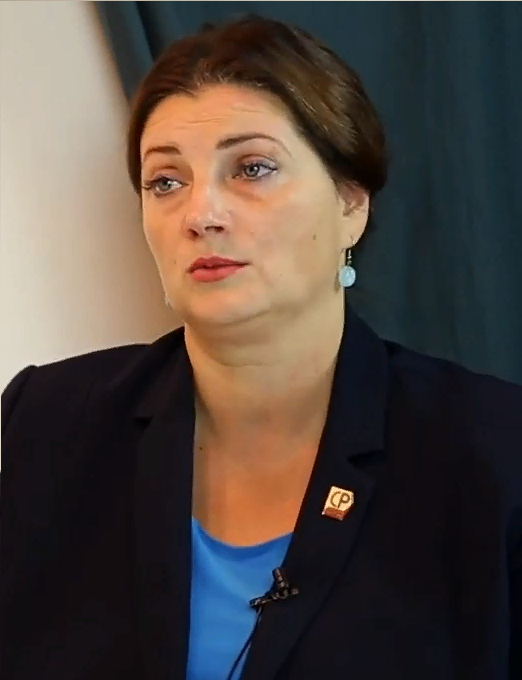
	Majority party	Minority party	Third party
		NL
Candidate	Aleksandr Belsky	Dmitry Panov	Leonid Slutsky
Party	United Russia	New People	LDPR
Last election	33.29%, 29 seats	10.05%, 3 seats	7.90%, 3 seats
Seats won	37	4	4
Seat change	▲8	▲1	▲1
Popular vote	1,240,655	280,239	275,814
Percentage	54.66%	12.35%	12.15%
Swing	▲21.37 pp	▲2.30 pp	▲4.25 pp
	Fourth party	Fifth party	Sixth party
Candidate	Irina Ivanova	Marina Shishkina	Nadezhda Tikhonova
Party	CPRF	The Greens	A Just Russia
Last election	17.47%, 7 seats	Did not participate	12.71%, 5 seats (Note: All 5 A Just Russia faction members left the party in April 2023 and allied with Russian Ecological Party "The Greens" in March 2026)
Seats won	2	3	0
Seat change	▼5	New	▼5
Popular vote	244,057	138,445	60,081
Percentage	10.75%	6.10%	2.65%
Swing	▼6.72 pp	New	▼10.06 pp
Chairman before election
Aleksandr Belsky
United Russia
Elected Chairman
Aleksandr Belsky
United Russia
Senator before election
Andrey Kutepov
United Russia
Senator after election
Andrey Kutepov
United Russia

The 2026 Legislative Assembly of Saint Petersburg election took place on 18–20 September 2026, on common election day, coinciding with the 2026 Russian legislative election. All 50 seats in the Legislative Assembly were up for re-election.

United Russia increased its majority in the Legislative Assembly, winning 54.7% of the vote and 21 single-mandate constituencies. New People finished second, winning four seats, with Liberal Democratic Party of Russia coming in close third. Communist Party of the Russian Federation lost more than a third of its vote share and five seats, which reduced CPRF to two deputies. A Just Russia suffered a crushing defeat, failing to cross 5% threshold after its entire faction left the party in April 2023. Russian Ecological Party "The Greens" entered the Legislative Assembly for the first time and its three deputies are former A Just Russia faction members.

== Electoral system ==
Under current election laws, the Legislative Assembly is elected for a term of five years, with parallel voting. 25 seats are elected by party-list proportional representation with a 5% electoral threshold, with the other half elected in 25 single-member constituencies by first-past-the-post voting. Seats in the proportional part are allocated using the Imperiali quota, modified to ensure that every party list, which passes the threshold, receives at least one mandate.

== Candidates ==
=== Party lists ===
To register regional lists of candidates, parties need to collect 0.5% of signatures of all registered voters in Saint Petersburg.

The following parties were relieved from the necessity to collect signatures:

- United Russia
- Communist Party of the Russian Federation
- Liberal Democratic Party of Russia
- A Just Russia
- New People
- Yabloko

№	Party	City-wide list	Candidates	Territorial groups	Status
1	United Russia	Aleksandr Belsky • Mikhail Kogan • Andrey Kutepov • Yekaterina Kondratyeva • Pavel Krupnik	80	25	Registered
2	Communist Party	Irina Ivanova • Pavel Dashkov • Aleksandr Rassudov • Roman Kononenko • Vyacheslav Borodenchik	71	25	Registered
3	New People	Dmitry Panov • Olga Gerasina • Artyom Nikolayev • Aleksey Kuznetsov • Anastasia Vasilyeva	44	24	Registered
4	Liberal Democratic Party	Leonid Slutsky • Ivan Yesipov • Pavel Itkin • Maksim Yakovlev • Aleksandr Ustimenko	69	25	Registered
5	The Greens	Marina Shishkina • Kristina Cheremnykh • Lyubov Mendeleyeva	63	25	Registered
6	A Just Russia	Nadezhda Tikhonova • Oleg Chernyshev • Sergey Mikheyev • Ilya Shmakov	56	25	Registered
	Yabloko	Dmitry Anisimov • Viktoria Razina • Yegor Karpenkov	62	25	Failed to qualify
	Rodina	Yulia Kovalchuk • Aleksandr Fedchenko • Andrey Khitrov	32		Failed the certification

Russian Ecological Party "The Greens" took part in the Saint Petersburg legislative election for the first time. Russian Party of Freedom and Justice, which participated in the last election, did not file, while Party of Growth was dissolved and merged into New People.

=== Single-mandate constituencies ===
25 single-mandate constituencies were formed in Saint Petersburg. To register candidates in single-mandate constituencies need to collect 3% of signatures of registered voters in the constituency.

Number of candidates in single-mandate constituencies
Party	Candidates	
Party	Nominated	Registered
United Russia	25	25
Communist Party	25	21
A Just Russia	24	19
New People	25	19
Yabloko	23	12
Liberal Democratic Party	25	23
Rodina	2	0
The Greens	10	4
Independent	3	0
Total	162	123

== Results ==
=== Results by party lists ===
Summary of the 18–20 September 2026 Legislative Assembly of Saint Petersburg election results
Party	Party list					Constituency		Total	
Party	Votes	%	±pp	Seats	+/–	Seats	+/–	Seats	+/–
United Russia	1,240,655	54.66	▲21.37	16	▲5	21	▲3	37	▲8
New People	280,239	12.35	▲2.30	3	▲1	1	Steady	4	▲1
Liberal Democratic Party	275,814	12.15	▲4.25	3	▲1	1	Steady	4	▲1
Communist Party	244,057	10.75	▼6.72	2	▼3	0	▼2	2	▼5
The Greens	138,445	6.10	New	1	New	2	New	3	New
A Just Russia	60,081	2.65	▼10.06	0	▼3	0	▼2	0	▼5
Yabloko	–	–	–	–	▼2	0	Steady	0	▼2
Invalid ballots	30,662	1.35	▼1.51	—	—	—	—	—	—
Total	2,269,953	100.00	—	25	Steady	25	Steady	50	Steady
Turnout	2,269,953	55.20	▲19.68	—	—	—	—	—	—
Registered voters	4,112,498	100.00	—	—	—	—	—	—	—

Aleksandr Belsky (United Russia) was re-elected as Chairman of the Legislative Assembly, while incumbent Senator Andrey Kutepov (United Russia) was re-appointed to the Federation Council.

=== Results in single-member constituencies ===
==== District 1 ====
Summary of the 18–20 September 2026 Legislative Assembly of Saint Petersburg election in District 1
Candidate	Party	Votes	%
Natalia Astakhova (incumbent)	United Russia	39,818	56.67%
Olga Arno	New People	9,315	13.26%
Kirill Chigirin	Liberal Democratic Party	8,437	12.01%
Yevgeny Babushkin	Communist Party	8,101	11.53%
Ilya Kiselyov	Yabloko	3,573	5.09%
Total		70,259	100%

==== District 2 ====
Summary of the 18–20 September 2026 Legislative Assembly of Saint Petersburg election in District 2
Candidate	Party	Votes	%
Aleksandr Rzhanenkov (incumbent)	United Russia	35,449	54.85%
Kristina Gorban	Liberal Democratic Party	7,489	11.59%
Tatyana Yesipenko	New People	7,004	10.84%
Denis Malinovsky	Communist Party	6,941	10.74%
Olga Tsepilova	Yabloko	4,119	6.37%
Irina Tumanova	A Just Russia	2,700	4.18%
Total		64,626	100%

==== District 3 ====
Summary of the 18–20 September 2026 Legislative Assembly of Saint Petersburg election in District 3
Candidate	Party	Votes	%
Yury Gladunov	United Russia	46,347	56.90%
Roman Lugovskoy	Communist Party	14,236	17.48%
Artyom Zverev	Liberal Democratic Party	12,172	14.94%
Gleb Dudoladov	A Just Russia	7,735	9.50%
Total		81,450	100%

==== District 4 ====
Summary of the 18–20 September 2026 Legislative Assembly of Saint Petersburg election in District 4
Candidate	Party	Votes	%
Konstantin Chebykin (incumbent)	United Russia	44,755	54.05%
Oksana Andreyeva	New People	9,322	11.26%
Dmitry Anisimov	Yabloko	7,842	9.47%
Nikolay Smoktiy	Communist Party	6,161	7.44%
Aleksandr Ustimenko	Liberal Democratic Party	5,788	6.99%
Nelli Vavilina	A Just Russia	4,127	4.98%
Kristina Cheremnykh	The Greens	3,976	4.80%
Total		82,798	100%

==== District 5 ====
Summary of the 18–20 September 2026 Legislative Assembly of Saint Petersburg election in District 5
Candidate	Party	Votes	%
Natalia Nikishina	United Russia	46,870	53.98%
Igor Andreyev	Communist Party	14,971	17.24%
Stanislav Korolkov	Liberal Democratic Party	11,763	13.55%
Ilya Leshchev	New People	11,455	13.19%
Total		86,825	100%

==== District 6 ====
Summary of the 18–20 September 2026 Legislative Assembly of Saint Petersburg election in District 6
Candidate	Party	Votes	%
Mikhail Amosov (incumbent)	The Greens	31,522	41.41%
Aleksey Kulkov	United Russia	17,525	23.02%
Yury Kulikov	New People	10,589	13.91%
Ivan Changli	Communist Party	8,858	11.64%
Yelena Belyayeva	A Just Russia	3,955	5.20%
Marina Peslyak	Yabloko	3,090	4.06%
Total		76,128	100%

==== District 7 ====
Summary of the 18–20 September 2026 Legislative Assembly of Saint Petersburg election in District 7
Candidate	Party	Votes	%
Vsevolod Belikov	United Russia	44,894	57.98%
Liliana Streltsova	Liberal Democratic Party	12,028	15.53%
Anna Ruzaykina	New People	10,406	13.44%
Igor Osipenko	Communist Party	8,971	11.59%
Total		77,436	100%

==== District 8 ====
Summary of the 18–20 September 2026 Legislative Assembly of Saint Petersburg election in District 8
Candidate	Party	Votes	%
Aleksandr Kushchak (incumbent)	United Russia	50,738	62.45%
Dmitry Panov	New People	13,467	16.58%
Igor Melnikov	Liberal Democratic Party	11,274	13.88%
Pavel Roginkin	A Just Russia	4,400	5.42%
Total		81,246	100%

==== District 9 ====
Summary of the 18–20 September 2026 Legislative Assembly of Saint Petersburg election in District 9
Candidate	Party	Votes	%
Igor Vysotsky (incumbent)	United Russia	51,828	58.62%
Mikhail Golovizin	Liberal Democratic Party	15,354	17.37%
Maksim Milyayev	New People	12,082	13.67%
Viktor Lozhechko	A Just Russia	7,856	8.89%
Total		88,415	100%

==== District 10 ====
Summary of the 18–20 September 2026 Legislative Assembly of Saint Petersburg election in District 10
Candidate	Party	Votes	%
Aleksandr Khodosok (incumbent)	United Russia	49,016	52.33%
Igor Matveyev	Liberal Democratic Party	14,062	15.01%
Dmitry Otsing	Communist Party	11,457	12.23%
Yulia Yarkina	New People	10,961	11.70%
Anatoly Krivenchenko	A Just Russia	3,741	3.99%
Ilya Fertikov	Yabloko	2,706	2.89%
Total		93,667	100%

==== District 11 ====
Summary of the 18–20 September 2026 Legislative Assembly of Saint Petersburg election in District 11
Candidate	Party	Votes	%
Valery Garnets (incumbent)	United Russia	53,706	64.66%
Andrey Chernov	Liberal Democratic Party	15,797	19.02%
Sergey Vesnov	Communist Party	11,821	14.23%
Total		83,064	100%

==== District 12 ====
Summary of the 18–20 September 2026 Legislative Assembly of Saint Petersburg election in District 12
Candidate	Party	Votes	%
Nikolay Bondarenko (incumbent)	United Russia	53,849	59.98%
Aleksandr Babikov	Liberal Democratic Party	12,220	13.61%
Viktoria Bykova	New People	11,441	12.74%
Kirill Isayev	Communist Party	11,073	12.33%
Total		89,771	100%

==== District 13 ====
Summary of the 18–20 September 2026 Legislative Assembly of Saint Petersburg election in District 13
Candidate	Party	Votes	%
Aleksandr Belov	United Russia	49,807	55.59%
Anton Pykhteyev	Liberal Democratic Party	11,464	12.79%
Aleksey Bogachev	Communist Party	11,417	12.74%
Dmitry Maslov	New People	10,664	11.90%
Andrey Orlov	Yabloko	3,267	3.65%
Sergey Shurinov	A Just Russia	1,974	2.20%
Total		89,600	100%

==== District 14 ====
Summary of the 18–20 September 2026 Legislative Assembly of Saint Petersburg election in District 14
Candidate	Party	Votes	%
Vera Sergeyeva	United Russia	55,208	60.09%
Yelena Galushko	Liberal Democratic Party	12,232	13.31%
Yelizaveta Roshchina	New People	10,708	11.65%
Aleksandr Rogozhkin	Communist Party	7,321	7.97%
Svetlana Bogomazova	Yabloko	2,318	2.52%
Aleksey Tushin	A Just Russia	2,311	2.52%
Total		91,877	100%

==== District 15 ====
Summary of the 18–20 September 2026 Legislative Assembly of Saint Petersburg election in District 15
Candidate	Party	Votes	%
Anton Solovyov	United Russia	39,243	50.26%
Oleg Golynsky	Liberal Democratic Party	16,949	21.71%
Bogdan Vasilenko	New People	12,101	15.50%
Leonid Shchelokov	A Just Russia	8,605	11.02%
Total		78,081	100%

==== District 16 ====
Summary of the 18–20 September 2026 Legislative Assembly of Saint Petersburg election in District 16
Candidate	Party	Votes	%
Andrey Aleskerov (incumbent)	The Greens	34,889	40.86%
Aleksey Nikonov	United Russia	16,858	19.74%
Aleksey Kuznetsov	New People	8,888	10.41%
Nikolay Kiselev	Communist Party	8,183	9.58%
Nadezhda Tikhonova	A Just Russia	7,813	9.15%
Aleksey Golovin	Liberal Democratic Party	7,415	8.68%
Total		85,379	100%

==== District 17 ====
Summary of the 18–20 September 2026 Legislative Assembly of Saint Petersburg election in District 17
Candidate	Party	Votes	%
Denis Chetyrbok (incumbent)	United Russia	49,972	56.70%
Aleksandr Mikhaylov	Communist Party	13,971	15.85%
Denis Romanov	New People	13,272	15.06%
Pyotr Levin	Yabloko	5,176	5.87%
Denis Sokolyuk	A Just Russia	5,125	5.82%
Total		88,133	100%

==== District 18 ====
Summary of the 18–20 September 2026 Legislative Assembly of Saint Petersburg election in District 18
Candidate	Party	Votes	%
Aleksey Tsivilyov	United Russia	48,225	53.52%
Aleksandr Latypov	Communist Party	12,031	13.35%
Andrey Badyin	New People	11,702	12.99%
Stanislav Fedotov	Liberal Democratic Party	9,101	10.10%
Galina Simonenkova	A Just Russia	7,058	7.83%
Total		90,114	100%

==== District 19 ====
Summary of the 18–20 September 2026 Legislative Assembly of Saint Petersburg election in District 19
Candidate	Party	Votes	%
Mikhail Baryshnikov (incumbent)	United Russia	60,740	63.97%
Ivan Kazakov	Communist Party	15,206	16.02%
Denis Kazakov	Liberal Democratic Party	10,236	10.78%
Olga Belyayeva	A Just Russia	7,139	7.52%
Total		94,944	100%

==== District 20 ====
Summary of the 18–20 September 2026 Legislative Assembly of Saint Petersburg election in District 20
Candidate	Party	Votes	%
Aleksey Makarov (incumbent)	United Russia	36,577	57.17%
Dmitry Khorzov	Yabloko	8,512	13.30%
Yekaterina Suturina	New People	6,115	9.56%
Andrey Ryabko	Communist Party	4,706	7.36%
Vladimir Osmolovsky	Liberal Democratic Party	4,247	6.64%
Aleksandra Smolina	A Just Russia	3,016	4.71%
Total		63,978	100%

==== District 21 ====
Summary of the 18–20 September 2026 Legislative Assembly of Saint Petersburg election in District 21
Candidate	Party	Votes	%
Andrey Malkov (incumbent)	Liberal Democratic Party	30,186	35.75%
Kirill Kazachenko	United Russia	18,815	22.29%
Gennady Denisov	Communist Party	17,012	20.15%
Anton Kostik	Yabloko	13,086	15.50%
Artyom Khamitov	A Just Russia	4,107	4.86%
Total		84,427	100%

==== District 22 ====
Summary of the 18–20 September 2026 Legislative Assembly of Saint Petersburg election in District 22
Candidate	Party	Votes	%
Vitaly Zholdasov	United Russia	44,268	57.47%
Pavel Itkin	Liberal Democratic Party	10,628	13.80%
Vadim Mamayev	A Just Russia	8,844	11.48%
Sergey Ivliyev	Communist Party	8,150	10.58%
Adrian Granishevsky	Yabloko	3,814	4.95%
Total		77,024	100%

==== District 23 ====
Summary of the 18–20 September 2026 Legislative Assembly of Saint Petersburg election in District 23
Candidate	Party	Votes	%
Anton Rudakov	United Russia	50,041	56.85%
Aleksandr Nikishechkin	Liberal Democratic Party	15,074	17.12%
Oleg Gromtsev	New People	12,207	13.87%
Tatyana Atanasova	A Just Russia	9,068	10.30%
Total		88,029	100%

==== District 24 ====
Summary of the 18–20 September 2026 Legislative Assembly of Saint Petersburg election in District 24
Candidate	Party	Votes	%
Dmitry Pavlov (incumbent)	New People	40,109	42.60%
Nikita Luzgin	United Russia	28,936	30.73%
Yelena Limonova	Liberal Democratic Party	10,143	10.77%
Roman Biryukov	Communist Party	9,362	9.94%
Aleksandr Zhuravlyov	A Just Russia	2,551	2.71%
Mikhail Butorin	Yabloko	2,065	2.19%
Total		94,147	100%

==== District 25 ====
Summary of the 18–20 September 2026 Legislative Assembly of Saint Petersburg election in District 25
Candidate	Party	Votes	%
Yelena Kiseleva (incumbent)	United Russia	44,668	55.58%
Yegor Mikhaylov	Communist Party	9,328	11.61%
Maria Vasilyeva	Yabloko	7,612	9.47%
Kirill Prokopenko	Liberal Democratic Party	7,162	8.91%
Marina Kordyukova	New People	5,827	7.25%
Olga Koroleva	The Greens	4,235	5.27%
Total		80,373	100%

=== Members ===
Incumbent deputies are highlighted with bold, elected members who declined to take a seat are marked with ~~strikethrough~~.

Constituency
No.	Member	Party
1	Natalia Astakhova	United Russia
2	Aleksandr Rzhanenkov	United Russia
3	Yury Gladunov	United Russia
4	Konstantin Chebykin	United Russia
5	Natalia Nikishina	United Russia
6	Mikhail Amosov	The Greens
7	Vsevolod Belikov	United Russia
8	Aleksandr Kushchak	United Russia
9	Igor Vysotsky	United Russia
10	Aleksandr Khodosok	United Russia
11	Valery Garnets	United Russia
12	Nikolay Bondarenko	United Russia
13	Aleksandr Belov	United Russia
14	Vera Sergeyeva	United Russia
15	Anton Solovyov	United Russia
16	Andrey Aleskerov	The Greens
17	Denis Chetyrbok	United Russia
18	Aleksey Tsivilyov	United Russia
19	Mikhail Baryshnikov	United Russia
20	Aleksey Makarov	United Russia
21	Andrey Malkov	Liberal Democratic Party
22	Vitaly Zholdasov	United Russia
23	Anton Rudakov	United Russia
24	Dmitry Pavlov	New People
25	Yelena Kiseleva	United Russia

Party lists
Member	Party
Aleksandr Belsky	United Russia
Mikhail Kogan	United Russia
Andrey Kutepov	United Russia
~~Yekaterina Kondratyeva~~	United Russia
Pavel Krupnik	United Russia
Vladimir Omelnitsky	United Russia
Anastasia Melnikova	United Russia
Aleksandr Seravin	United Russia
~~Nikolay Tsed~~	United Russia
Aleksey Anikin	United Russia
Yelena Zhikhareva	United Russia
Georgy Zhuravlev	United Russia
~~Lyubov Yegorova~~	United Russia
Yury Avdeyev	United Russia
Yevgenia Voronina	United Russia
Yelena Lozko	United Russia
Olga Bubnova	United Russia
Vladimir Nosov	United Russia
Dmitry Dmitriyev	United Russia
Dmitry Panov	New People
Olga Gerasina	New People
Artyom Nikolayev	New People
~~Leonid Slutsky~~	Liberal Democratic Party
Ivan Yesipov	Liberal Democratic Party
Pavel Itkin	Liberal Democratic Party
Maksim Yakovlev	Liberal Democratic Party
~~Irina Ivanova~~	Communist Party
Pavel Dashkov	Communist Party
Aleksandr Rassudov	Communist Party
Marina Shishkina	The Greens

== See also ==
- 2026 Russian regional elections
