= Khural =

Khural or Hural may refer to:

- Great Khural of Tuva, Russia
- State Great Khural of Mongolia
- Little Khural of Mongolia
- People's Khural of Buryatia, Russia
- People's Khural of Kalmykia, Russia

== See also ==
- Kurultai
