= Larisa Yudina =

Russian journalist

- Лариса Алексеевна Юдина
- Born: 22 October 1945; Elista, Russia
- Died: 8 June 1998 (aged 52); Elista, Russia
- Education: Moscow State University
- Occupations: Journalist and editor

Larisa Alexeyevna Yudina (Russian: Лариса Алексеевна Юдина; 22 October 1945 – 8 June 1998) was a journalist and the editor of the opposition newspaper, Sovietskaya Kalmykia Sevodnya (Soviet Kalmykia Today). She was found dead on 8 June 1998, with multiple knife wounds and a fractured skull, in Elista, the capital of the Republic of Kalmykia.

== Early life and education ==
Yudina was born in Elista, northwest of the Caspian Sea, on 22 October 1945. She studied journalism at Moscow State University.

== Career ==
After graduating from the university with a degree in journalism, Yudina began to work as a correspondent for Molodyozh Kalmykii. She then worked as a correspondent for Sovietskaya Kalmykia Segodnya (Soviet Kalmykia Today). During her journalism career, Yudina suffered continuous harassment by local authorities. Later, she became the editor of this paper. She was also co-chairperson in the local branch of the Yabloko party.

== Death ==
Prior to her death, she had published articles accusing Kirsan Ilyumzhinov, the president of Kalmykia, of corruption. Three men were convicted in connection with the murder, but the names of those who ordered the killing remain unknown. It was on her return from distributing newspapers that she was murdered. Her body was found dead beside a pond outside the city of Elista in Kalmykia on 7 July 1998.

== Perpetrators ==
Two of the men who confessed to the murder, and were imprisoned, were aides to Kirsan Ilyumzhinov. However, no proof has yet been found that Kirsan himself ordered the crime.
