= Kirsan Ilyumzhinov =

Russian oligarch and politician (born 1962)

- Кирсан Илюмжинов; Үлмҗин Кирсән; Үлэмжийн Хярсан
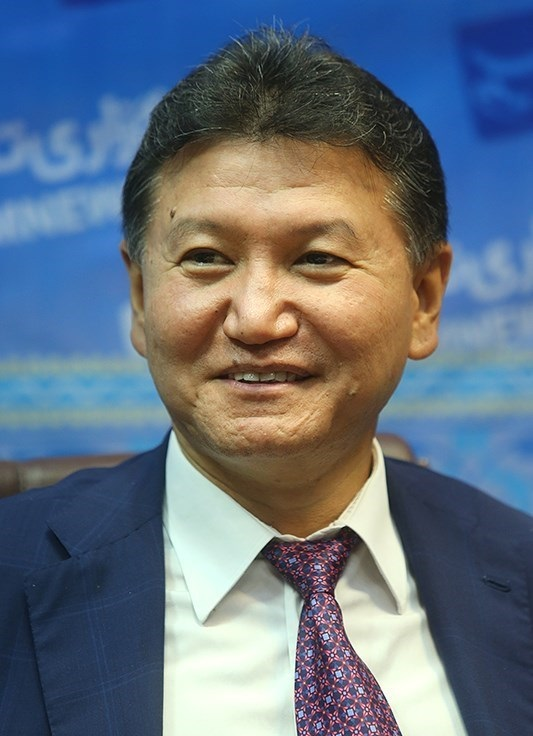
- Ilyumzhinov in 2016

President of FIDE
- In office November 1995 – October 2018
- Preceded by: Florencio Campomanes
- Succeeded by: Arkady Dvorkovich

President of Kalmykia
- In office 23 April 1993 – 24 October 2010
- Succeeded by: Aleskey Orlov

Personal details
- Born: 5 April 1962 (age 64) Elista, Kalmyk ASSR, Russian SFSR, Soviet Union
- Party: United Russia
- Spouse: Diana Dmitrievna Ilyumzhinova (née Gurova)
- Education: Moscow State Institute of International Relations (MGIMO)
- Profession: Businessman
- Kirsan Ilyumzhinov's voice Ilyumzhinov on the Echo of Moscow program, 8 March 2007

Kirsan Nikolayevich Ilyumzhinov (Note: Russian: Кирса́н Никола́евич Илюмжи́нов, [kʲɪrˈsan nʲɪkɐˈlajɪvʲɪt͡ɕ ɪlʲʉmˈʐinəf]; Kalmyk: Үлмҗин Кирсән, Ülmcin Kirsən, [yləmˈd͡ʒin cirˈsæn], Mongolian: Үлэмжийн Хярсан, romanized: Ülemjiin Khyarsan, [ʊɮəmˈd͡ʒiːŋ xirˈsɑŋ]) (born 5 April 1962) is a Russian oligarch, administrator and politician. He was President of the Republic of Kalmykia in the Russian Federation from 1993 to 2010, and was president of FIDE, the chess international governing body, from 1995 to 2018. He has also been at the forefront of promoting chess in schools in Russia and overseas. He is the founder of Novy Vzglyad publishing house.

He has been an honorary president of the former Kalmykian FC Uralan.

== Personal life ==
Ilyumzhinov was born in Elista, Kalmykia. His parents were subject to the Kalmyk deportations of 1943 when the entire Kalmyk population was deported to Siberia – Kirsan's own family had an impeccable record fighting the Germans (he was named after a great-uncle who served in the Red Army during the Russian Civil War and committed suicide after having been ordered to execute large numbers of captured Whites). He grew up in Elista, after the Kalmyks were allowed to return following Stalin's death. From a young age he became interested in chess, and he won the Kalmykian national chess championship in 1976 at the age of 14. From 1979 to 1980 Ilyumzhinov worked as a mechanic-fitter at the Zvezda plant in Elista. After serving two years with the Soviet Army, he returned to the plant as a mechanic for a year, and then studied at the Moscow State Institute of Foreign Relations from 1983 to 1989. Between 1989 and 1990 he was a sales manager for the Soviet-Japanese automobile company "Liko-Raduga" in Moscow, and from 1990 until 1993 he was President of SAN Corporation in Moscow. Ilyumzhinov acquired his wealth with the emergence of the private sector which followed the collapse of the USSR. Kirsan was married to Danara Ilyumzhinova (née Davashkina) and they have one son, David. Ilyumzhinov also has two brothers, Sanal and Vyacheslav.

He is now married for the third time. His third wife, whom he married on July 27, 2021 is Diana Dmitrievna Ilyumzhinova (née Gurova).

In addition to his native Kalmyk and Russian, he is fluent in English, Japanese, and speaks a little Korean, Mongolian and Chinese.

=== UFO experience ===
Ilyumzhinov has drawn worldwide attention for claiming that in September 1997 he was taken from his flat by aliens and travelled in their spaceship, visiting another planet. He claims three of his staff searched his flat during this, failing to find him, and could not explain how he then reappeared in his bedroom an hour later. A Chess Notes feature article by Edward Winter provides a comprehensive collection of Ilyumzhinov's own words on his alleged encounters with aliens.

== Political career ==
On 12 April 1993, Ilyumzhinov was elected as the first president of the Republic of Kalmykia, and remained president until 2010. Soon after his election, Ilyumzhinov introduced presidential rule, concentrating power in his own hands. He called early elections on 15 October 1995 and was re-elected unopposed, this time for a 7-year term. He won re-election in 2002. Ilyumzhinov's election platform for the presidency of Kalmykia included promising voters $100 each and a mobile phone for every shepherd—much of the population of Kalmykia living from agriculture. He once campaigned under the slogan "a wealthy president is a safeguard against corruption." He also pledged to introduce what he called an "economic dictatorship" in the republic, as well as to continue to promote chess in Kalmykia, in Russia and to the wider world. After his re-election in 1995, Ilyumzhinov reportedly told a journalist from the Russian daily Izvestia, "Irrespective of what I tell people, I give them instructions on a subconscious level, a code. I do the same thing when I communicate with Russian citizens from other regions. I am creating around the republic a kind of extra-sensory field and it helps us a lot in our projects."

Ilyumzhinov has spent millions of dollars on chess and supporting religion. He built a Catholic church after a visit with Pope John Paul II. He says has also built a mosque, a synagogue, 22 Orthodox churches, and 30 Buddhist temples. Chess was made a compulsory subject in the first three years of elementary school—the only place in the world where this is the case. The region now has numerous champions. The 14th Dalai Lama has visited Kirsan Ilyumzhinov on many occasions and has blessed a number of the temples in Elista, as well as Kalmyk Buddhist temples overseas. Ilyumzhinov denies persistent accusations of diverting the republic's resources for his own use and of suppressing media freedom. In 2004, police dispersed a small number of demonstrators who demanded his resignation. When Australian journalist Eric Campbell interviewed people in Elista about Ilyumzhinov, he found that many were happy that he had managed to gain widespread attention for Kalmykia through chess, although one was slightly critical of the money invested in chess projects.

On 8 June 1998, Larisa Yudina, a publisher of an opposition newspaper, was stabbed to death in Elista. Both people convicted in the murder were Kalmykian government aides, and one was an advisor to Ilyumzhinov. One other person was acquitted by offering evidence to help in the conviction. Ilyumzhinov denied any involvement with the murder; the incident was investigated by the local and the Russian authorities. On 24 October 2010 Ilyumzhinov retired as Head of Kalmykia, being replaced by Alexey Orlov. On 12 June 2011, Ilyumzhinov appeared in public in Tripoli alongside the then-embattled, since overthrown and executed, Libyan leader Muammar Gaddafi, after having played a game of chess with him.

=== United States sanctions ===
On 25 November 2015, the United States Department of the Treasury named him a Specially Designated National "for materially assisting and acting for or on behalf of the Government of Syria, Central Bank of Syria, Adib Mayaleh, and Batoul Rida." Due to these sanctions, on 6 December 2015, Ilyumzhinov withdrew from any legal, financial and business operations of FIDE until such time as he is removed from the list. Despite this, on 12 February 2018, UBS announced they would be closing all FIDE bank accounts.

On June 30, the President of the U.S. has issued an Executive Order that removes U.S. sanctions on Syria, effective July 1, 2025. This has resulted a change on the situation of Kirsan Ilyumzinov that his name has been removed from the sanctions list.

== FIDE career ==
In November 1995, Ilyumzhinov became President of the International Chess Federation, investing a large amount of his private fortune into the game. He has been enthusiastic about attracting international tournaments to Kalmykia, and many grandmasters have done so. His flamboyant plans to build an extravagant Chess City in the republic led to protests by some people, but have been praised by others for generating good publicity. The 1996 match between Gata Kamsky and Anatoly Karpov was originally scheduled to be played in Baghdad, but was moved to Elista due to the international reaction.

In other developments during that time, Kirsan Ilyumzhinov encountered opposition from rivals in the European chess federations, the U.S., and Canada. Some of these managed to a special meeting in Utrecht, Netherlands, on 27–28 April. The meeting called for equal treatment for Kamsky and Karpov, the restoration of the traditional FIDE cycle of qualifying contests leading to the world title match, and a shake-up in FIDE. To reinforce this reformation the Utrecht partners supported a candidate to challenge Ilyumzhinov at the FIDE Congress that took place alongside the Chess Olympiad. The candidate was Jaime Sunye Neto, a grandmaster from Brazil. Ilyumzhinov was successful in mustering support from the Third World and from Russia, and he won the election 87–46. There was no restoration of the traditional qualifying cycle, and Ilyumzhinov's own preference for a $5 million knockout contest for the world's top 100 players was deferred from December 1996 until December 1997, with no definite sponsor announced.

In the summer of 1998, Kirsan Ilyumzhinov announced his possible candidacy for the Russian presidency. This coincided with Anatoly Karpov being critical of the annual knockout FIDE world title system. Karpov argued that his contract with FIDE stipulated that the winner of the 1998 Karpov-Anand match would hold the title for two years. Karpov's successful advocacy of his rights led to the cancellation of a planned world title knockout series in Las Vegas, Nevada, later in that year. Since Karpov had an unsuccessful year, apart from his match against Anand, and he was unable to resist the plan that he would have to enter this knockout, whenever it came to be organized, at a far earlier stage.

Ilyumzhinov managed to persuade the 140 member countries of FIDE to take part in the main team event of the year, the Chess Olympiad, scheduled to start in late September 1998, in Elista. However the event started late due to the failure to complete the new venue in time. In the end, it attracted 110 teams to the main event, a Swiss system contest shortened to 13 rounds to allow for the delay.

On 2 June 2006, Ilyumzhinov was re-elected as FIDE President by a margin of 96–54 against his opponent Bessel Kok. In an October 2006 Wall Street Journal article Garry Kasparov, who backed a rival to Ilyumzhinov, criticized Ilyumzhinov FIDE's leadership stating: "(Ilyumzhinov) has created a vertical column of power that would be familiar to any observer of Russia today." Nigel Short, the British grandmaster who also supported Kirsan's rival for the leadership of FIDE, joined Kasparov's misgivings at Ilyumzhinov's victory.

On 29 September 2010, Kirsan Ilyumzhinov was reelected as President of FIDE defeating his rival, Anatoly Karpov decisively – winning this election by 95 votes to 55. However, there were bitter accusations of cheating and corruption about the voting system with CJ de Mooi, the president of the English Chess Federation, saying: "This was a farce of a vote...There wasn't even a pretence of fairness and free speech."

In 2014, Kirsan Ilyumzhinov was reelected as President of FIDE after defeating Garry Kasparov, winning 110–61.

On his 20th anniversary as FIDE president in November 2015, Ilyumzhinov listed his major achievements as: recognition of chess as a sport, unification of the world chess championship, stable financial situation of FIDE, complete FIDE calendar, the number of people playing chess increased more than ten times, the FIDE family has substantially increased, and development of women's chess. In an interview on the same occasion, he mentioned that while not currently aspiring to become FIFA president, he might well become a candidate in the future, saying "I have a vision of how to make football still more popular and cleanse the organisation of corruption, like we did it with FIDE."

Due to OFAC sanctions, on 6 December 2015, Ilyumzhinov withdrew from any legal, financial and business operations of FIDE until such time as he is removed from the OFAC list but he remains in control of FIDE. In a subsequent interview, he said the USA sanctions were either a mistake or a provocation, with his lawyers planning to file a US$50 billion lawsuit, based on their estimated damages. Previously in June 2014, Ilyuzmhinov had noted that his name was floating around concerning sanctions regarding Ukraine.

On 27 March 2017, FIDE stated through its website that Ilyumzhinov had announced his resignation, and that the extraordinary meeting will be held next month to review and accept the resignation. Ilyumzhinov later denied his resignation in Russian media, as did his assistant when contacted by Chess.com; FIDE executive director Nigel Freeman replied that Ilyumzhinov had verbally resigned during the Presidential Board Meeting in Athens, and called an Extraordinary Presidential Board Meeting to discuss the issue. At the meeting, it was confirmed that Ilyumzhinov had not formally resigned, however he was criticized for making misleading statements to the media.

In May 2018, Chessdom.com reported Ilyumzhinov to have applied for the new FIDE election with a virtual candidate on his ticket called "Glen Stark".

On 13 July 2018, the FIDE ethics commission sanctioned Kirsan Ilyumzhinov for violating the FIDE code of ethics. The FIDE president, who was banned from "holding any position" effectively for six months, initially announced his intentions to fight this decision. However, shortly after, he desisted from running for a new term as FIDE President.

After having been in office for 23 years, since 1995, Kirsan Ilyumzhinov was finally ousted, clearing the path for a successor. The Greek Georgios Makropoulos, who had been General Secretary since 1990 and number two in the organization under Kirsan's presidency, was the first to announce his ticket. He was followed by the Englishman Nigel Short, a world title contender in the World Chess Championship 1993 against Garry Kasparov. The last to announce his candidacy was Arkady Dvorkovich, who had served as Russian deputy prime minister and was also a member of the supervisory board of the Russian Chess Federation. Dvorkovich was also one of the chief organizers of the 2018 FIFA World Cup. In the elections, held in Batumi (Georgia) in October 2018, Dvorkovich won by 103 votes to 78 against Makropoulos, thus becoming FIDE's 7th President in history.

== Awards ==
- Order of the Golden Fleece (Georgia)

== Publications ==
=== Autobiography ===
Ilyumzhinov called his autobiography The President's Crown of Thorns. Chapter titles included "Without Me the People Are Incomplete" (a quote from a short story by Andrei Platonov), "I Become a Millionaire" and "It Only Takes Two Weeks to Have a Man Killed"—the latter being about the problems with rising crime in some parts of Russia.

=== Mentions in literature ===
Ilyumzhinov features prominently in these books:

- The History of Kalmykia: from Ancient times to Kirsan Ilyumzhinov and Aleksey Orlov, by Justin Corfield. [Chapter 4: pages 119–193 is about Kirsan Ilyumzhinov. This is the only book that draws on several meetings with Kirsan Ilyumzhinov, interviews with his father, teachers and colleagues, and it also has an extensive family tree of the Ilyumzhinovs.] (ISBN 978-1-876586-29-4).
- Curse of Kirsan: Adventures in the Chess Underworld, by Sarah Hurst (ISBN 1-888690-15-1) (privately published by Russell Enterprises Inc.).
- The Chess Artist, by J. C. Hallman (ISBN 0-312-27293-6).
- Absurdistan, by Eric Campbell (ISBN 0732279801).
- King's Gambit: A Son, A Father, and the World's Most Dangerous Game, by Paul Hoffman (ISBN 1401300979).
- Novodvorskaya. The last vestal of the revolution, by Yevgeny Dodolev (ISBN 978-5-386-07861-4).

Ilyumzhinov also has a whole chapter devoted to him in The Lost Cosmonaut by Daniel Kalder. (ISBN 9780571227815) (Faber, 2006).

There is also a brief biographical account on the website for the Embassy of Republic of Kalmyki.
