= List of chairpersons of the People's Khural of Kalmykia =

The chairman of the People's Khural of Kalmykia is the presiding officer of that legislature.

== Chairmen of the Supreme Soviet ==
Name	Period
Vladimir Basanov	April 1990–November 1992
Ilya Bugdayev	November 1992–April 30, 1993

== Chairman of the Temporary Parliament ==
Name	Period
Ilya Bugdayev	April 30, 1993–October 16, 1994

== Chairmen (Speakers) of the People's Khural of Kalmykia ==
Name	Period
Konstantin Maksimov	October 20, 1994–February 4, 1999
Vyacheslav Bembetov	February 4, 1999–April 4, 2005
Igor Kichikov	April 21, 2005–February 24, 2008
Anatoly Kozachko	March 7, 2008–October 2023
Artyom Mikhailov	October 2023–Present
