= Aleksey Orlov (politician) =

Russian politician

- Алексей Орлов
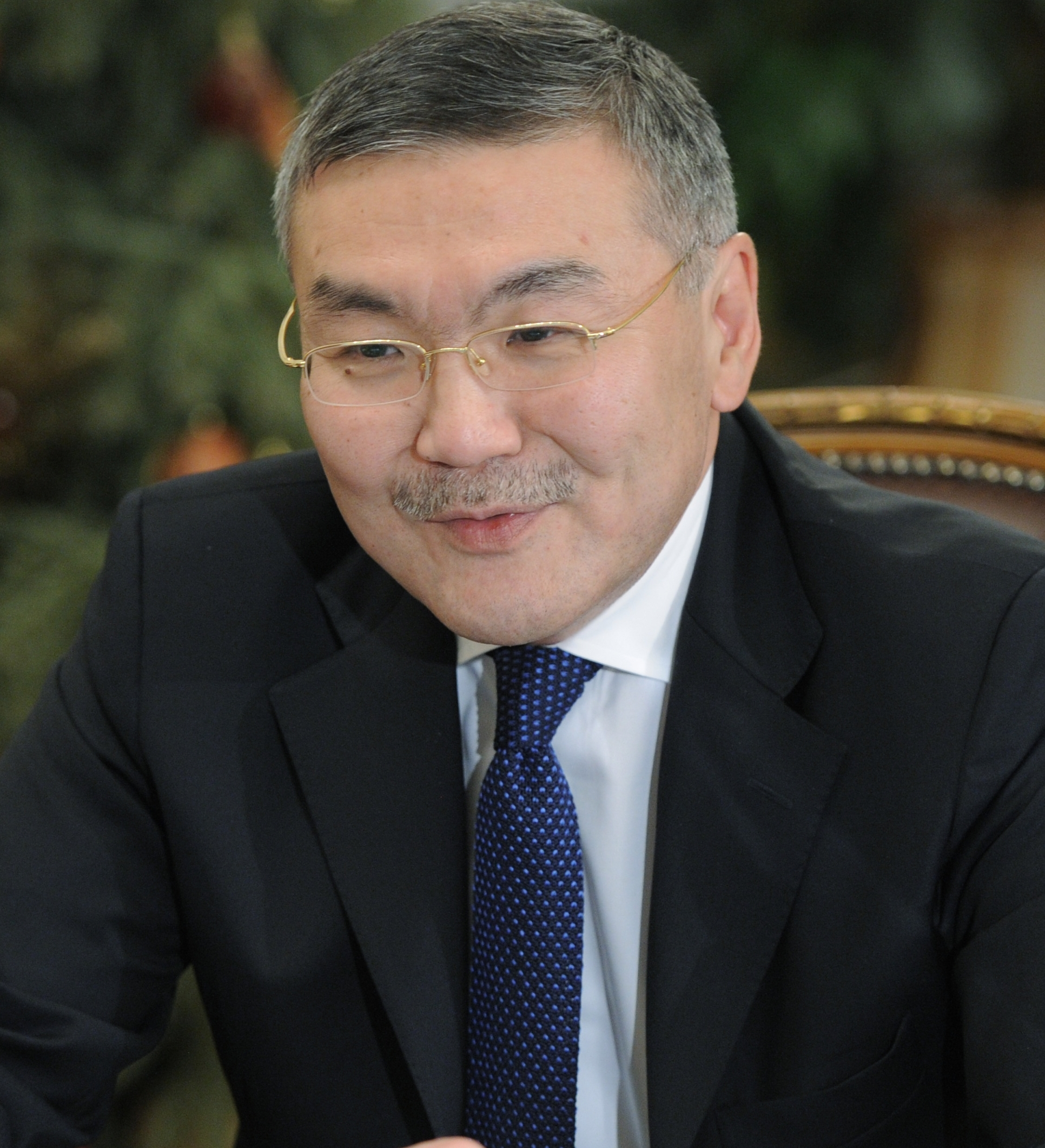
- Orlov in 2012

Russian Federation Senator from Kalmykia
- Incumbent
- Assumed office 23 October 2019
- Preceded by: Yury Bikyukov
- Succeeded by: Boris Khachirov

2nd Head of Kalmykia
- In office 24 October 2010 – 20 March 2019
- Preceded by: Kirsan Ilyumzhinov
- Succeeded by: Batu Khasikov

Personal details
- Born: 9 October 1961 (age 64) Elista, Kalmyk ASSR, Russian SFSR, Soviet Union (now Kalmykia, Russia)
- Party: United Russia

Aleksey Maratovich Orlov (Russian: Алексей Маратович Орлов, Oirat: Орлов Алексей Маратович, Orlov Aleksey Maratoviç) is a Russian politician, who serves as Russian Federation Senator from Kalmykia since 2019. He previously served as Head of Kalmykia from 2010 to 2019.

== Early life ==
Orlov was born on 9 October 1961 in Elista, the capital of Kalmykia, to an ethnic Kalmyk family.

In 1984, he graduated from the Moscow State Institute of International Relations of the MFA of the USSR.

== Early career ==
From 1984 to 1985, Orlov worked as chief inspector of the association for the export of agrarian products "Selkhozprodexport", Moscow. In 1986, he began work as a plumber at the Moscow plant "Agregat". In 1989, he became department manager, and later the head of the Trade-union center of the MFA service department. In 1991 he began to serve as Director General, Vice Manager of the Soviet-Yugoslav Joint Venture Company JSC "Sov-Yug", a position which he held until 1994. From August 1994 to January 1995, he was Vice Manager at CJSC "Poisk". From February 1995 to July 1995 he worked as Director General of the Russian-Italian Joint Venture Company CJSC "MAG".

== Political career ==
From 1995 to 2010, Orlov served in different roles as a liaison between the government of Kalmykia and the office of the President of Russia.

On 21 September 2010, Russian President Dmitry Medvedev nominated Orlov to be Head of Kalmykia from a list of four candidates proposed by his ruling United Russia Party. On 28 September he was confirmed by the republic's legislature, the People's Khural of Kalmykia. He took office the following month, succeeding Kirsan Ilyumzhinov. After Russia re-adopted direct popular elections for Governors, he announced his ultimately successful run for re-election in 2014. In March 2019, Orlov was implicated in an embezzlement scandal regarding the construction of housing for orphans in Elista. Orlov resigned as Head of Kalmykia later that month and was succeeded by kickboxer Batu Khasimov.

Preceded by Kirsan Ilyumzhinov	Head of the Republic of Kalmykia; 2010–2019	Succeeded by Batu Khasikov
