= Head of the Republic of Kalmykia =

Highest-ranking official in Kalmykia, Russia

- Хальмг Таңһчин Толһач (Kalmyk); Глава Республики Калмыкия (Russian)
- Standard for the Head the Republic

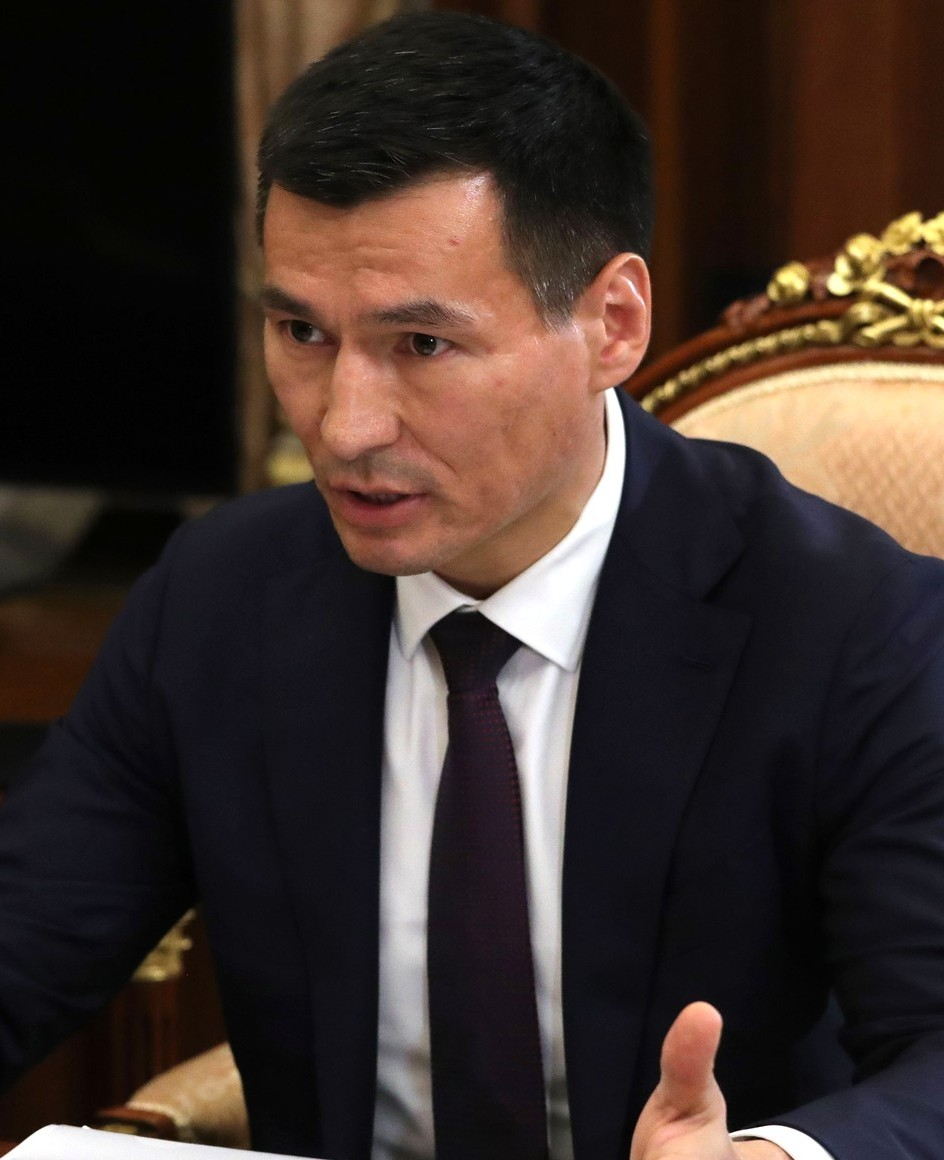
- Incumbent; Batu Khasikov since 20 March 2019
- Executive branch of the Republic of Kalmykia
- Style: His Excellency; The Honorable
- Type: Governor; Head of state; Head of government
- Term length: 5 years, renewable
- Formation: 12 September 1991
- First holder: Kirsan Ilyumzhinov
- Website: Official website

The Head of Kalmykia is an elected official who serves as the head of state of Kalmykia. Since the fall of the Soviet Union, three people have served as Heads of the Republic.

== List of officeholders ==
=== Preceding offices (1990–93) ===
Head of state (Note: Chairman of the Supreme Soviet.)	Term of office	Head of government (Note: Chairman of the Council of Ministers.)	Term of office	Ref.
Vladimir Basanov (born 1948)	April 1990 – November 1992 (resigned)	Batyr Mikhailov (1941–2026)	1989 – October 1992 (resigned)	
Ilya Bugdayev (1938–2011)	November 1992 – 23 April 1993 (successor took office)	Maksim Mukubenov (1940–2024)	October 1992 – 30 April 1993 (acting)	

=== President/Head of the Republic (1993–present) ===
No.	Portrait	Name (born–died)	Term of office			Political party	Election	Ref.
No.	Portrait	Name (born–died)	Took office	Left office	Time in office	Political party	Election	Ref.
President (1993–2005)
1		Kirsan Ilyumzhinov (born 1962)	23 April 1993	24 October 2005	12 years, 184 days	Independent	1993; 1995; 2002	
1		Kirsan Ilyumzhinov (born 1962)	23 April 1993	24 October 2005	12 years, 184 days	United Russia	1993; 1995; 2002	
Head of the Republic (2005–present)
1		Kirsan Ilyumzhinov (born 1962)	24 October 2005	24 October 2010	5 years, 0 days	United Russia	2005 (Note: Appointed by the President of Russia with the consent of the People's Khural.)	
2		Aleksey Orlov (born 1961)	24 October 2010	20 March 2019	8 years, 147 days	United Russia	2010; 2014	
3		Batu Khasikov (born 1980)	20 March 2019	Incumbent	7 years, 171 days	United Russia	2019; 2024	

The latest election for the office was held on 8 September 2024.

== Source ==
- Russian Administrative divisions
