= Alexei Mayorov =

Russian politician (born 1961)

- Алексей Майоров
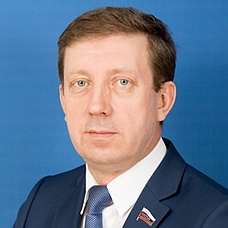
- Official portrait, 2018

Senator from Kalmykia
- Incumbent
- Assumed office 5 July 2011
- Preceded by: Vladimir Babichev

Member of the People's Khural of Kalmykia
- Incumbent
- Assumed office 2013

Personal details
- Born: Alexei Mayorov; 29 December 1961 (age 64) Klimovsk, Russian SFSR, Soviet Union (now Russia)
- Party: United Russia
- Education: Kutafin Moscow State Law University, Bauman Moscow State Technical University

Alexei Petrovich Mayorov (Russian: Алексей Петрович Майоров; born 29 December 1961) is a Russian politician who is currently serving as a senator since 2011 and member of the People's Khural of Kalmykia since 2013.

He was previously a local politician and banker.

== Biography ==
Mayorov was born on 29 December 1961 in Klimovsk, Moscow Oblast. In 1985, he graduated from the Bauman Moscow State Technical University. In 1997, he also received a degree from the Kutafin Moscow State Law University.

From 1987 to 1991, he was the first secretary of the Podolsk branch of Komsomol.

Following the fall of communism, in 1991, he moved to the private sector. Until 1999, he worked in commercial banks in Moscow.

He was then appointed Head of the Primary Territorial Administration in the Directorate of the President of Russia. From March to July 2011, he was a Member of the Tsagan-Unskii rural municipal administration, before vacating his seat as a result of his appointment to the Federation Council by the People's Khural, the state legislature of the southern region of Kalmykia.

As a senator, he voted to ratify the 2022 treaty that effectively recognised the short-lived independence of the Donetsk and Lugansk People's Republics. The vote was one of the reasons cited for his sanctioning by the European Union, United Kingdom, United States, Canada, Switzerland, Australia, Ukraine, New Zealand.

While simultaneously being a senator, he also now serves in the People's Khural itself, to which he was elected in 2013 and re-elected in 2018.
