= Andrey Kutepov =

Russian politician

- Андрей Кутепов
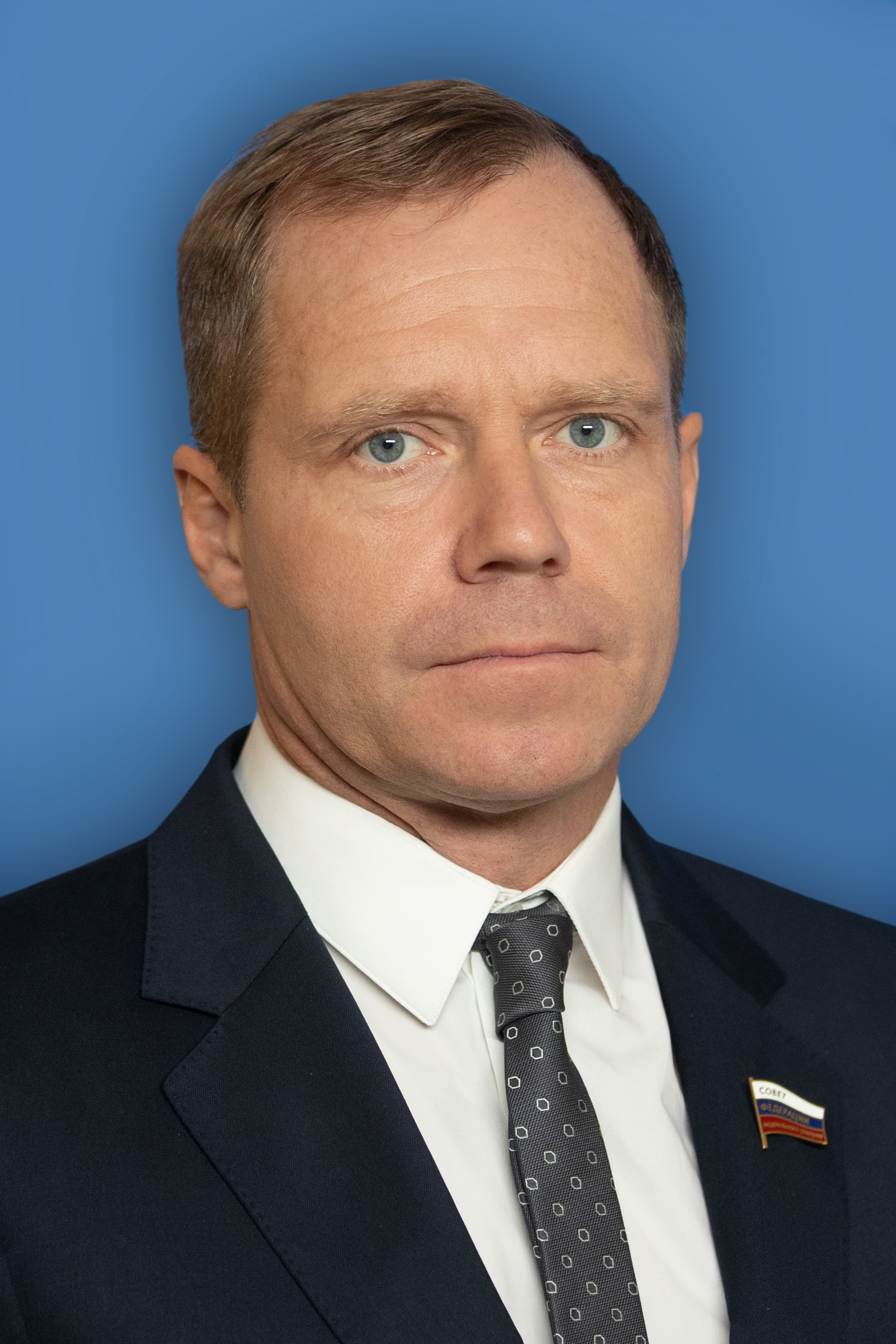

Senator from Saint Petersburg
- Incumbent
- Assumed office 29 September 2021
- Preceded by: Lyudmila Kostkina

Personal details
- Born: Andrey Kutepov; 6 April 1971 (age 55) Leningrad, Russian Soviet Federative Socialist Republic, Soviet Union (now Saint Petersburg)
- Party: United Russia
- Education: Russian Presidential Academy of National Economy and Public Administration, Diplomatic Academy of the Ministry of Foreign Affairs of the Russian Federation

Andrey Viktorovich Kutepov (Russian: Андрей Викторович Кутепов; born 6 April 1971) is a Russian politician serving as a senator from the city of Saint Petersburg since 18 September 2016.

== Career ==
Andrey Kutepov was born on 6 April 1971 in Leningrad (now Saint Petersburg). Later he graduated from the Leningrad Naval School. In 2007 and 2015, he also got degrees from the Russian Presidential Academy of National Economy and Public Administration and the Diplomatic Academy of the Ministry of Foreign Affairs of the Russian Federation. From 1991 to 1997, Kutepov worked in the commercial structures. Afterward, he worked as a deputy director and a director of the cinema "Mayak" in St. Petersburg. He started his political career in 2003, when he was appointed advisor in the group for ensuring the activities of the Deputy Head of the Directorate of the President of the Russian Federation in St. Petersburg. From 2009 to 2011, he was the head of the Primorsky District administration. From 2012 to 2016, Kutepov occupied different positions in the Office of the Federation Council of the Russian Federation. On 18 September 2016, he was elected deputy of the Legislative Assembly of Saint Petersburg. On 29 September 2021, he was appointed senator from the city of Saint Petersburg.

== Sanctions ==
Andrey Kutepov is under personal sanctions introduced by the European Union, the United Kingdom, the USA, Canada, Switzerland, Australia, Ukraine, New Zealand, for ratifying the decisions of the "Treaty of Friendship, Cooperation and Mutual Assistance between the Russian Federation and the Donetsk People's Republic and between the Russian Federation and the Luhansk People's Republic" and providing political and economic support for Russia's annexation of Ukrainian territories.
