= Batu Khasikov =

Russian kickboxer

- Бату Хасиков; Хаска Бату
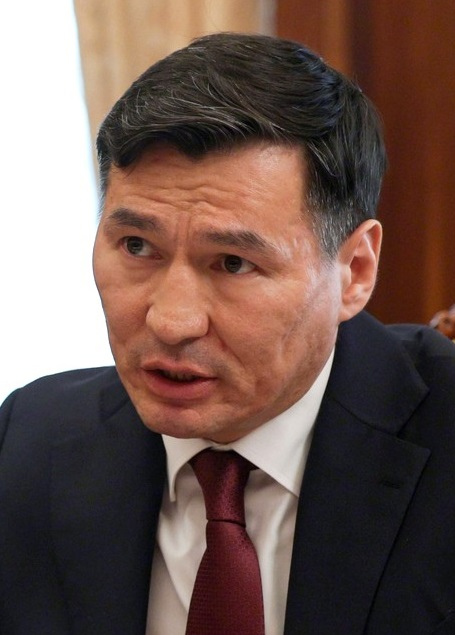
- Khasikov in 2024

3rd Head of Kalmykia
- Incumbent
- Assumed office 20 March 2019
- Preceded by: Aleksey Orlov

Russian Federation Senator from Kalmykia
- In office 21 November 2012 – 14 September 2014
- Preceded by: Mikhail Kapura
- Succeeded by: Yury Biryukov

Member of the People's Khural of Kalmykia
- In office 2008–2012

Personal details
- Born: Batu Sergeyevich Khasikov; 28 June 1980 (age 46) Moscow, Russian SFSR, Soviet Union

Batu Khasikov
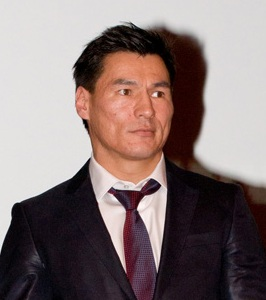
- Height: 1.76 m (5 ft 9 in)
- Division: Light-Middleweight; Welterweight
- Style: Kickboxing
- Team: Fight Nights

Kickboxing record
- Total: 83
- Wins: 67
- By knockout: 35
- Losses: 13
- Draws: 3

Other information
- University: Moscow State Pedagogical University

Batu Sergeyevich Khasikov (Note: /bəˈtuː ˈxɑːsɪkɒf/ bə-TOO KHAH-sik-off; Russian: Бату Сергеевич Хасиков, pronounced [bɐˈtu sʲɪrʲˈgʲejɪvɪtɕ ˈxasʲɪkəf]; Oirat: Хаска Бату, romanized: Khaska Batu, pronounced [χasə̆ˈqʰa paˈtʰu]) (born 28 June 1980) is a Russian politician, activist and former kickboxer who has served as head of the Republic of Kalmykia since 2019. He previously served as a Russian Federation senator from 2012 to 2014 and as a member of the People's Khural from 2008 to 2012.

As a former professional kickboxer, he has won several world championships.

== Personal life ==
Khasikov was born to Kalmyk father and Tatar mother. He is a Tibetan Buddhist.

Khasikov is married and has two children. His wife, Elena Khasikova (née Shchur), is a fashion designer who graduated from the Ufa State University of Economics and Service with a degree in hotel management in 2009, and from the Lesgaft National State University of Physical Education, Sport and Health with a degree in athleticism in 2013.

On 5 August 2020, Khasikov became one of the first governors in Russia to be diagnosed with novel coronavirus.

== Education ==
Khasikov graduated from the Moscow State Pedagogical University, the faculty of physical culture. He continued postgraduate study in Russian Presidential Academy of National Economy and Public Administration (candidate of political science, 2012).

In February 2016, having considered the application of representatives of the Dissernet community, the Dissertation Council of Peoples' Friendship University of Russia cancelled Khasikov's PhD degree.

== Career in sports ==
Khasikov was born in Moscow, and later in his childhood he moved to Lagan, in the Republic of Kalmykia. There he began training in Kyokushin at the age of 11. Having moved to Moscow in 1997, Khasikov kept training, and in 2000–2001 he won several Seiwakai and Kyokushin competitions.

In the course of 2005–2010 Khasikov became a three-time Russian champion (WAKO), WAKO European champion, and gained the championship belts in average weights. In October 2007, Khasikov defeated Ricardo Fernandes from Portugal (WAKO-Pro), in November 2007, he defeated Harris Norwood (ISKA), in and November 2010, he won a victory over Fabio Corelli (WKA).

In 2011, Khasikov defeated renowned kickboxers Albert Kraus and Mike Zambidis in K-1 (W5 World Champion title was gained).

On 4 May 2012 on MMA festival "The battle of Kalmykia" Khasikov defeated Warren Stevelmans. In November of the same year, he won the K-1 WAKO-Pro title after defeating Mohammad Reza Nazari. On 3 November, at the "Battle of Moscow 8" event, Khasikov knocked out the popular Gago Drago.

On 24 March 2014 the "Battle of Moscow 15" Fight Nights promoter hosted an event in "Rossiya Luzhniki", where Khasikov and Mike Zambidis had a rematch fight, which was the main event of tournament. That fight was a matter of principle for both opponents. Before the fight, Khasikov announced that he would retire if he won the fight. For Zambidis, the fight was an opportunity to vindicate himself. The fight was a mighty sensation given Khaskov's status as a senator from the Republic of Kalmykia. From the start, Khasikov pressured Zambidis and controlled the fight throughout, but in the third round, Zambidis showed dangerous signs of retaliation. In a split decision, Khasikov won the fight. On Federation Council meeting, Khasikov was congratulated on victory.

Khasikov has also had more than 200 amateur bouts.

== Politics ==
From 2003 to 2008, Khasikov worked in police establishment. He holds the rank of a senior lieutenant. In March 2008, his duties changed course as a result of his election of Federation Council's member of the Republic of Kalmykia. In March 2019, Khasikov replaced Aleksey Orlov as the acting head of the Republic of Kalmykia, and was formally elected to the position in September 2019 as part of the United Russia party. After being elected, Khasikov appointed Dmitry Trapeznikov, former leader of the Donetsk People's Republic, as head of Elista, the capital of Kalmykia. This prompted a series of protests in Elista calling for Trapeznikov's removal. Khasikov was re-elected to a second term in the 2024 Kalmyk head election.

Khasikov is the leader of the "For a Healthy Country" civic organization. The function of organization is healthy lifestyle promotion. Today, the All-Russian Social Movement "For A Healthy country" organizes events in different cities on a regular basis.

== Sanctions ==
On 20 November 2022, against the backdrop of the Russian invasion of Ukraine, Khasikov was sanctioned by the United Kingdom, noting that "the region he controls is one of the poorest ethnic republics in Russia, from which a significant number of mobilized soldiers were called up for the war." For similar reasons, he was added into the Specially Designated Nationals and Blocked Persons List of the Office of Foreign Assets Control by the United States Department of the Treasury on 24 February 2023.

Khasikov was sanctioned by the UK government in 2022 in relation to the Russo-Ukrainian War.

== Fight Nights ==
Khasikov is the promoter and co-founder of Eurasia Fight Nights. Fight Nights is a mixed martial arts (MMA) promotion in Russia which also promotes shows in other Russian-speaking countries. Its live events and competitions have been broadcast on Russia-2 and REN TV. Before appointment as Federation Council's member, Khasikov was a Fight Nights producer and a Fight Nights fighter.

== Championships and awards ==
- 2014 WKN Super Welterweight Oriental Rules World Champion -72.6 kg
- 2012 W.A.K.O. Pro World Champion -75 kg (low kick rules)
- 2011 W5 World Champion, 71 kg, Moscow (Russia), Fight Nights: Battle of Moscow 5
- 2010 WKA World Champion, -72.5 kg, Moscow (Russia), Battle of Champions 5
- 2010 W.A.K.O. Pro World Champion (low kick rules) 71.8 kg, Moscow (Russia), Fight Nights: Battle of Moscow
- 2010 W.A.K.O. Amateur European Champion (low kick rules), -71 kg, Baku (Azerbaijan)
- 2007 ISKA World Champion, freestyle, light-middleweight 72.5 kg (man), Moscow (Russia)

== Kickboxing record ==
Kickboxing record
67 wins (35 (T)KOs), 13 losses, 3 draws
Date	Result	Opponent	Event	Location	Method	Round	Time
2014-03-28	Win	(Greece) Mike Zambidis	Fight Nights: Battle of Moscow 15	Moscow, Russia	Decision (split)	5	3:00
For WKN Super Welterweight Oriental Rules World Championship -72.6 kg.
2012-11-03	Win	(Armenia) Gago Drago	Battle of Moscow 8	Moscow, Russia	KO (right cross)	1	
2012-10-14	Win	(Iran) Mohamed Reza Nazari	Team Russia vs. Team Asia	Khabarovsk, Russia	TKO (broken jaw)	3	
Wins WAKO Pro low kick rules middleweight world title (-75 kg)
2012-05-04	Win	(South Africa) Warren Stevelmans	Battle in Kalmykia	Elista, Russia	Decision (split)	3	3:00
2011-11-05	Win	(Greece) Mike Zambidis	W5	Moscow, Russia	TKO (referee stoppage)	1	1:51
Wins W5 World title (-71 kg)
2011-03-12	Win	(Netherlands) Albert Kraus	Fight Nights: Battle of Moscow 3	Moscow, Russia	Decision (unanimous)	3	3:00
2010-11-19	Win	(Italy) Fabio Corelli	Battle of Champions 5	Moscow, Russia	KO	2	
Wins WKA World title (-72.5 kg)
2010-06-05	Win	(Portugal) Ricardo Fernandes	Battle at Moscow	Moscow, Russia	RTD	3	2:16
Wins WAKO Pro low kick rules light middleweight world title (-71.8 kg)
2009-10-02	Loss	(Portugal) Ricardo Fernandes	Battle of Champions in Elista	Elista, Russia	Decision (unanimous)	3	3:00
Fight was for vacant WAKO Pro low kick rules light middleweight world title (-71.8 kg)
2007-11-30	Win	(United States) Haris Norwood	Battle of Champions	Moscow, Russia	KO		
Wins ISKA World title (-71 kg)
2007-05-19	Win	(Russia) Rizvan Isaev	Battle of Champions 2	Moscow, Russia	Decision (unanimous)	3	3:00
Legend: Win Loss Draw/no contest Notes

== Honours ==
- Honoured worker of Physical Culture and Sport of the Republic of Kalmykia
- The owner of "Golden belt" of Russian Union of martial arts in nomination "The Brightest Victory of Year" (7th national award ceremony)

== Filmography ==
- Shadowboxing 2: Revenge (episode, 2007)
- Shadowboxing 3: Last Round (2011)
- Batu Khasikov before the fight (documentary, 2011)
- Batu (documentary, 2012)
- Red Hills (series, 2013)
- Warrior (film)

== See also ==
- List of male kickboxers
