= Kalmyk State University =

University in Elista, Russia

- Калмыцкий государственный университет Хальмг улусин ик сурһуль
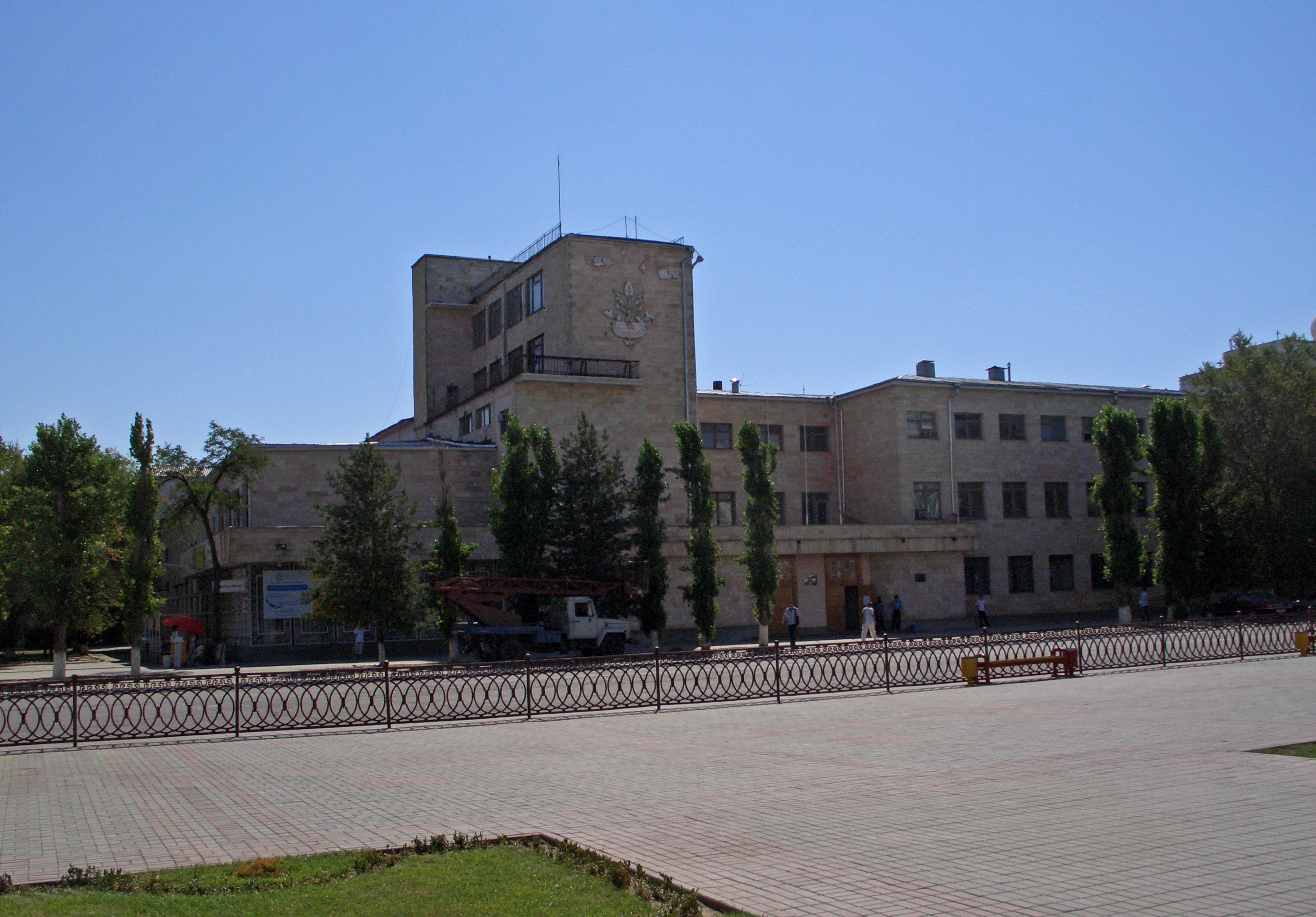
- University main building
- Type: Public research
- Established: 1970
- Location: 11 Pushkina Street, Elista, Russia; 46°18′28″N 44°16′14″E
- Campus: Urban
- Website: kalmgu.ru

Kalmyk State University (Note: Russian: Калмыцкий государственный университет; Oirat: Хальмг улусин ик сурһуль, romanized: Khalmg ulusin ik surhul) is the oldest and largest university in Kalmykia. Since 2011 it is called Federal State Budget Educational Establishment of Higher Professional Education. The university was established in 1970, and now it has more than 8,000 students, studying at 7 Departments and 1 institute:

- Department of Engineering and Technology;
- Department of Humanities;
- Department of Mathematics, Physics and Information Technology;
- Department of Pedagogical Education and Biology;
- Department of Agriculture;
- Department of Economics;
- Department of Management and Law;
- Institute of Kalmyk Philology and Oriental Studies.

== Recent developments ==
In 2022, the Veterinary Medicine and Life reported that Kalmyk State University had established a new research center for the reproduction of farm animals, sponsored by the regional Ministry of Agriculture.

In 2024, the Caucasian Knot reported that the Russian government had ordered the creation of a military training centre at Kalmyk State, among other universities.
