= People's Khural of Kalmykia =

Regional parliament of Kalmykia, Russia

People's Khural of Kalmykia Народный хурал Калмыкии Хальмг Таңһчин ардин хурл
- 6th legislature

Type
- Type: Unicameral

Leadership
- Chairman: Artyom Mikhailov, United Russia

Structure
- Seats: 27
- Political groups: United Russia (23) CPRF (2) SRZP (1) NP (1)

Elections
- Voting system: Proportional
- Last election: 10 September 2023
- Next election: 2028

Meeting place
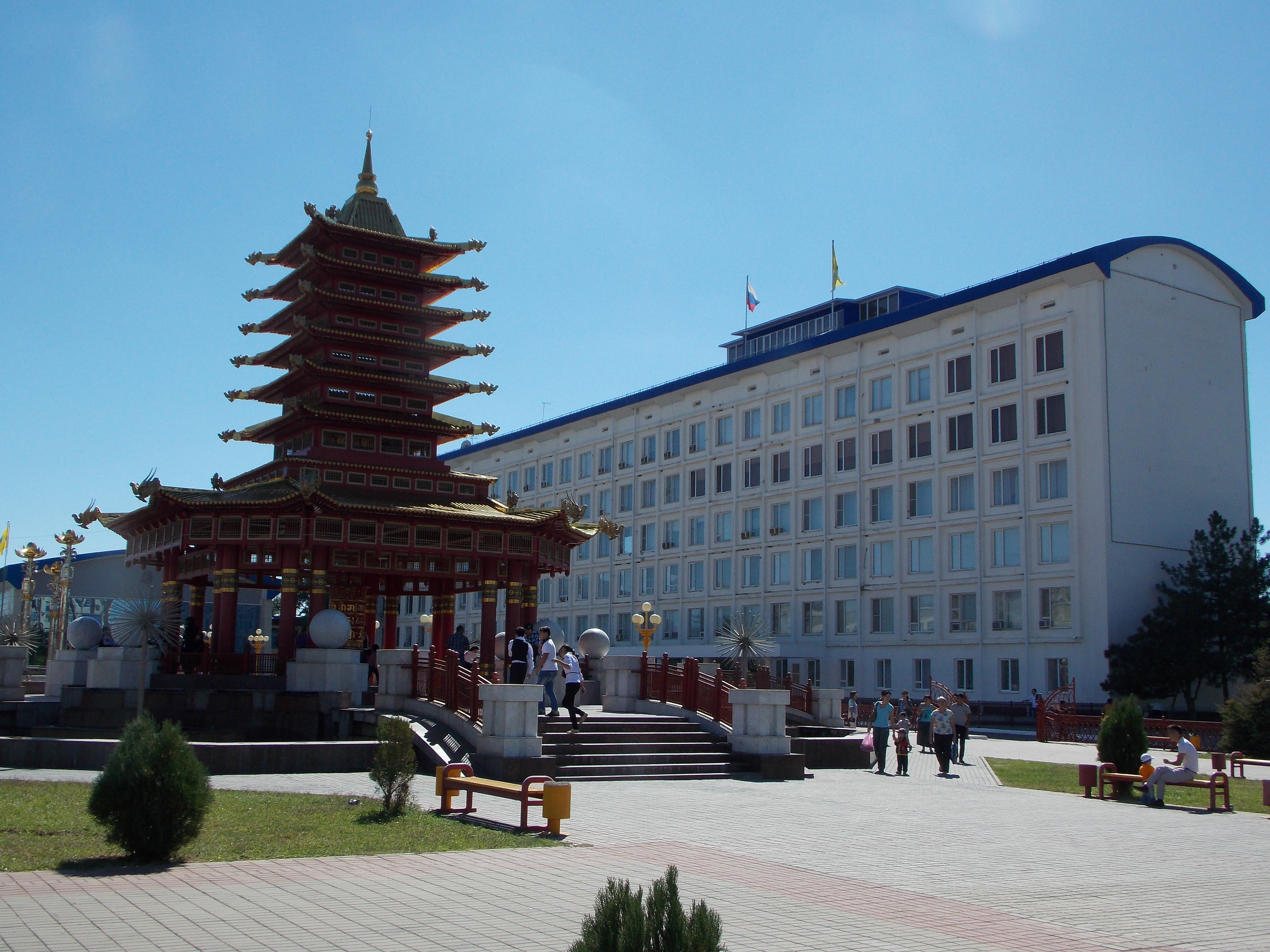
- Lenin Street, Elista

Website
- http://www.huralrk.ru

The People's Khural (Parliament) of the Republic of Kalmykia (Note: Russian: Народный Хурал (Парламент) Республики Калмыкия, romanized: Narodnyj Hural (Parlament) Respubliki Kalmykija, [nɐˈrodnʲi xʊˈraɫ (pɐrlɐˈmʲent) rʲisˈpʊblʲiki kɐlˈmɨkijɐ]; Kalmyk: Хальмг Таңһчин ардин хурл, romanized: Haľmg Tañğçin ardin xurl, [xɑlʲˈməɡ ˈtʰɑŋɣət͡ʃʰiːn ˈɑrtiːn xurˈəl]) is the regional parliament of Kalmykia, a federal subject of Russia. It consists of 27 deputies elected for five-year terms.

== History ==
The People's Khural was established in accordance with the Constitution of the Russian Federation of 1993. But the assembly was also formed along Mongolian traditions of the State Great Khural. The legislative period normally lasts five years.

On 18 October 1994, the first People's Khural was elected. New legislatures were elected in 1999, 2005 and 2008. The fourth legislature, which was constituted in 2008, consisted of 27 deputies: 17 deputies from United Russia, seven from the Communist Party and three from the Agrarian Party of Russia. The legislature ended in 2013, when new regional parliamentary elections were held. The current chairman of the People's Khural is Artyom Mikhailov from United Russia.

== Elections ==
=== 2018 ===
Party	%	Seats
United Russia	68.52	21
Communist Party of the Russian Federation	13.23	4
A Just Russia	8.45	2
Registered voters/turnout	54.3	

=== 2023 ===
Party	%	Seats
United Russia	64.18	23
Communist Party of the Russian Federation	13.33	2
New People	8.36	1
A Just Russia	5.23	1
Registered voters/turnout	42.07	

== See also ==
- List of chairpersons of the People's Khural of Kalmykia
