= Mayovka (disambiguation) =

Mayovka was a countryside picnic in May in the Russian Empire and later an illegal celebration of May 1 by revolutionary public.

Mayovka or Mayevka may also refer to:

- Mayevka, Kyrgyzstan, a village in Chuy Province, Kyrgyzstan
- Mayovka, Kaliningrad Oblast, a former rural locality (a settlement) in Chernyakhovsky District of Kaliningrad Oblast; merged into the town of Chernyakhovsk in June 1996

== See also ==
- Mayevka, Russia, a list of rural localities in Russia
