= Lagan =

Lagan may refer to:

== Entertainment ==
- Lagan (1941 film), Indian Bollywood film
- Lagan (1955 film), a Bollywood film
- Lagan (1971 film), Bollywood film
- Lagaan, 2001 Indian epic sports-drama film
- "Lagan", a song by the Afro Celt Sound System from the album Volume 3: Further in Time

== Places ==
- Lagan Valley (Assembly constituency), in the Northern Ireland Assembly
- Lagan Valley (Northern Ireland Parliament constituency)
- Lagan Valley (UK Parliament constituency)
- Lagan Valley, valley in Northern Ireland
- Lagan, County Armagh, a townland in County Armagh, Northern Ireland
- Lagan, Iran, a village in Markazi Province, Iran
- Lagan, Russia, a town in the Republic of Kalmykia, Russia
- Lagan, Sweden, a locality in Ljungby Municipality, Sweden, named after the river

== Other uses ==
- Lagan (from लगान), payment by lessee to the landlord in lieu of lease, in India
- Lagan College, the first integrated school in Northern Ireland
- Lagan (Sweden), a river in southwestern Sweden
- River Lagan, river in Northern Ireland
- MS Stena Lagan, a ferry operating in the Irish Sea
- Flotsam, jetsam, lagan and derelict, shipwrecked goods

== See also ==
- Laggan (disambiguation)
- Lagansky (disambiguation)
