= Mayevka, Russia =

Mayevka (Russian: Маевка) or Mayovka (Маёвка) is the name of several rural localities in Russia.

== Modern localities ==
- Mayevka, Republic of Bashkortostan, a village in Churayevsky Selsoviet of Mishkinsky District in the Republic of Bashkortostan
- Mayevka, Diveyevsky District, Nizhny Novgorod Oblast, a village in Diveyevsky Selsoviet of Diveyevsky District in Nizhny Novgorod Oblast
- Mayevka, Vetluzhsky District, Nizhny Novgorod Oblast, a village in Kruttsovsky Selsoviet of Vetluzhsky District in Nizhny Novgorod Oblast
- Mayevka, Orenburg Oblast, a settlement in Volodarsky Selsoviet of Pervomaysky District in Orenburg Oblast
- Mayevka, Sverdlovsk Oblast, a settlement in Alapayevsky District of Sverdlovsk Oblast
- Mayevka, Republic of Tatarstan, a village in Zelenodolsky District of the Republic of Tatarstan
- Mayevka, Tula Oblast, a settlement in Shevelevskaya Rural Administration of Shchyokinsky District in Tula Oblast
- Mayevka, Vladimir Oblast, a settlement in Alexandrovsky District of Vladimir Oblast

== Alternative names ==
- Mayevka, alternative name of Tsoros, a settlement in Yuzhnenskaya Rural Administration of Gorodovikovsky District in the Republic of Kalmykia; 46°7′N 42°4′E
- Mayevka, alternative name of Boskhachi, a settlement in Tsagan-Nurskaya Rural Administration of Oktyabrsky District in the Republic of Kalmykia; 47°22′N 45°16′E

== Abolished localities ==
- Mayovka, Kaliningrad Oblast, a former rural locality (a settlement) in Chernyakhovsky District of Kaliningrad Oblast; merged into the town of Chernyakhovsk in June 1996
