= Administrative divisions of Kalmykia =

Administrative divisions of Russian federal subject

Republic of Kalmykia Russia
- Administrative centre: Elista

Administrative structure (as of 2012)
- Districts: 13
- Cities/towns: 3
- Urban-type settlements: 0
- Selsovets: 111

Municipal structure (as of 2002)
- Rural settlements: 262 (inhabited); 1 (uninhabited)

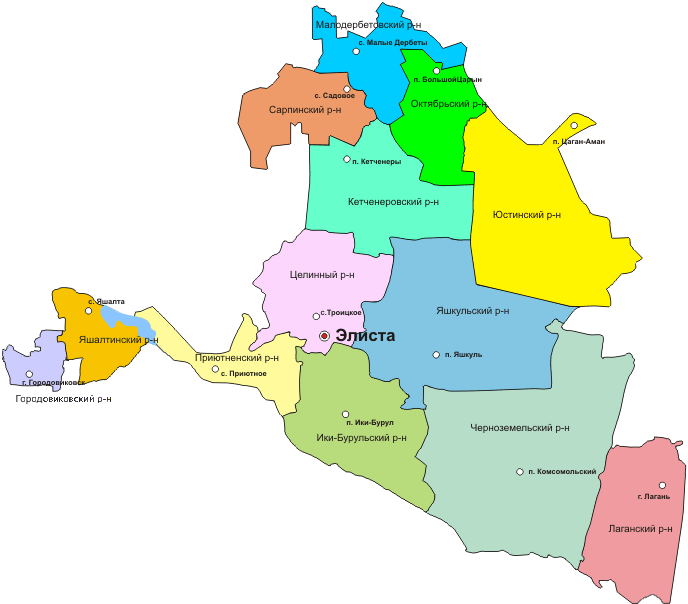
Map of the Republic of Kalmykia

Republic of Kalmykia is a federal subject of Russia.

== Administrative and municipal divisions ==
- Cities and towns of republic significance
  - Elista (Элиста) (capital)
- Districts:
  - Chernozemelsky (Черноземельский)
    - with 8 rural administrations under the district's jurisdiction.
  - Gorodovikovsky (Городовиковский)
    - Towns under the district's jurisdiction:
      - Gorodovikovsk (Городовиковск)
    - with 6 rural administrations under the district's jurisdiction.
  - Iki-Burulsky (Ики-Бурульский)
    - with 13 rural administrations under the district's jurisdiction.
  - Ketchenerovsky (Кетченеровский)
    - with 9 rural administrations under the district's jurisdiction.
  - Lagansky (Лаганский)
    - Towns under the district's jurisdiction:
      - Lagan (Лагань)
    - with 4 rural administrations under the district's jurisdiction.
  - Maloderbetovsky (Малодербетовский)
    - with 6 rural administrations under the district's jurisdiction.
  - Oktyabrsky (Октябрьский)
    - with 7 rural administrations under the district's jurisdiction.
  - Priyutnensky (Прию́тненский)
    - with 8 rural administrations under the district's jurisdiction.
  - Sarpinsky (Сарпинский)
    - with 9 rural administrations under the district's jurisdiction.
  - Tselinny (Целинный)
    - with 11 rural administrations under the district's jurisdiction.
  - Yashaltinsky (Яшалтинский)
    - with 11 rural administrations under the district's jurisdiction.
  - Yashkulsky (Яшкульский)
    - with 12 rural administrations under the district's jurisdiction.
  - Yustinsky (Юстинский)
    - with 7 rural administrations under the district's jurisdiction.
