= Gorodovikovsky =

Gorodovikovsky (masculine), Gorodovikovskaya (feminine), or Gorodovikovskoye (neuter) may refer to:

- Gorodovikovsky District, a district of the Republic of Kalmykia, Russia
- Gorodovikovskoye Urban Settlement, a municipal formation which the Town of Gorodovikovsk in Gorodovikovsky District of the Republic of Kalmykia, Russia is incorporated as
