= Anatoly Popov =

Russian politician (born 1960)

- Анатолий Попов
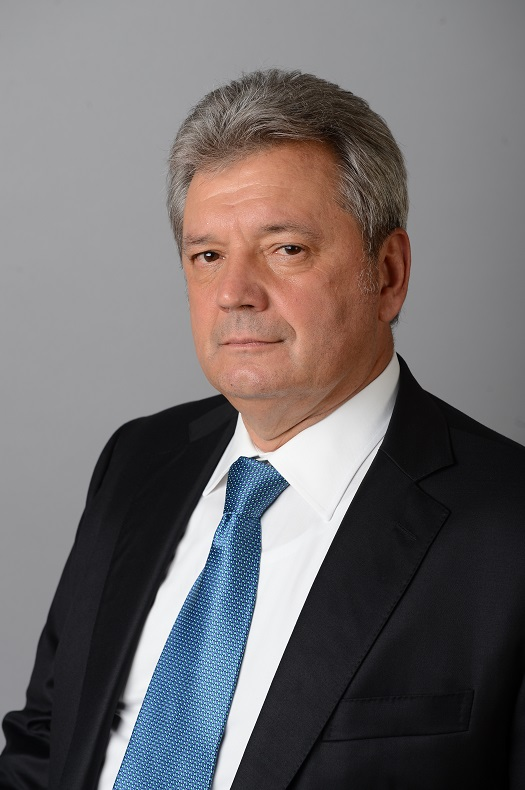

Director of the Department of Budget Policy in the Sphere of the State Military and Law Enforcement Service and the State Defense Order of the Ministry of Finance of the Russian Federation
- Incumbent
- Assumed office November 2013

Chairman of the Government of the Chechen Republic
- In office 10 February 2003 – 16 March 2004
- Preceded by: Eli Isayev (acting)
- Succeeded by: Eli Isayev (acting)

Acting Head of the Provisional Administration of the Chechen Republic
- In office 5 August 2003 – 10 October 2003

Personal details
- Born: Anatoly Aleksandrovich Popov; 10 July 1960 (age 66) Sukhotinsky, Russia Soviet Union

Anatoly Alexandrovich Popov (Russian: Анато́лий Алекса́ндрович Попо́в; born July 10, 1960) is an ethnic Russian who was the Prime Minister of the Chechen Republic, Russia, from February 10, 2003, following the resignation of Mikhail Babich, to March 16, 2004. He was also acting President of the Chechen Republic from August 2003 to October 2003 during the presidential elections.
