= Sarpinsky District =

Sarpinsky District Сарпинский район (Russian)
- District

Other transcription(s)
  - Kalmyk: Сарпан район
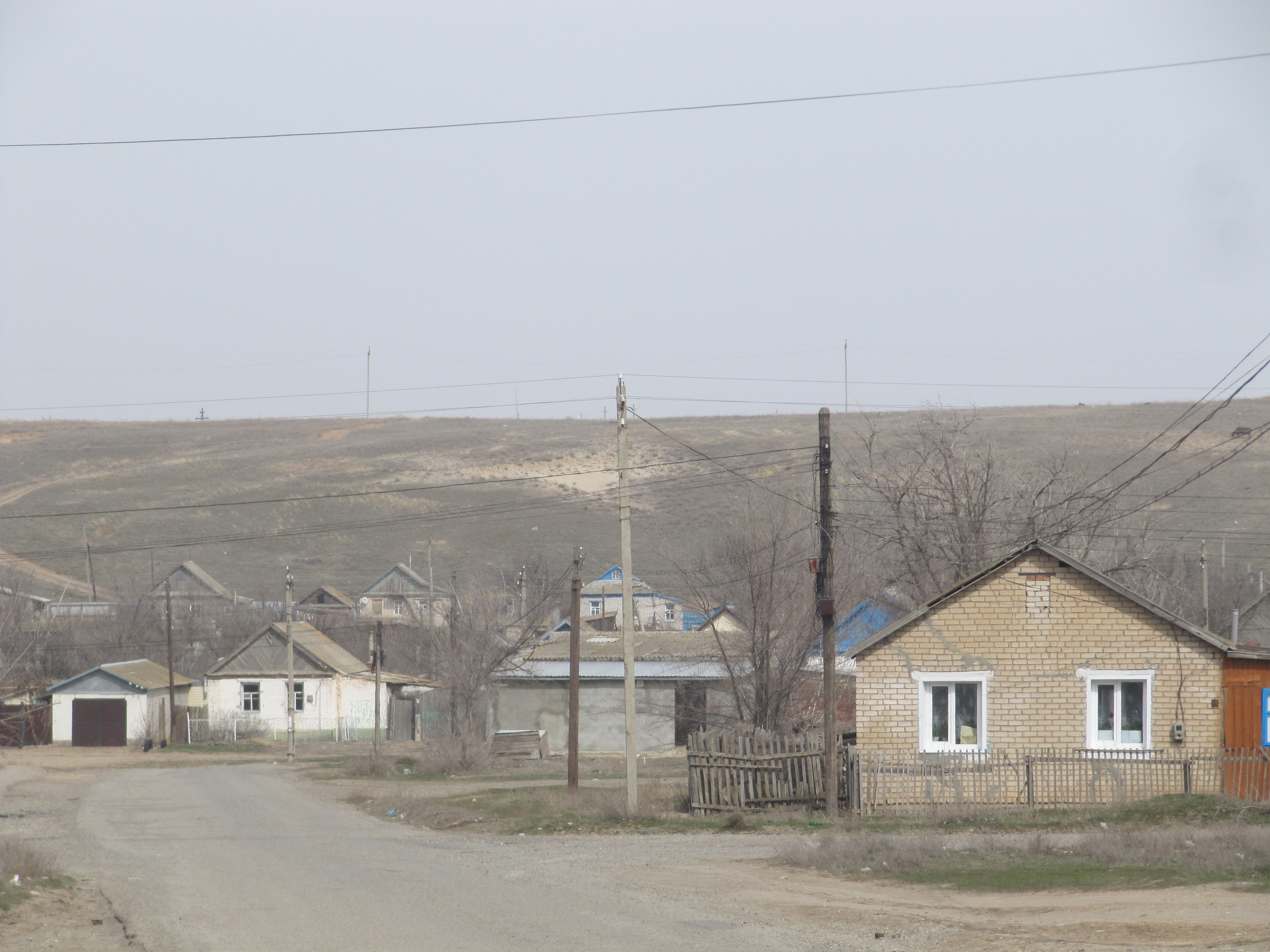
- The selo of Sadovoye, the administrative center of Sarpinsky District
- Location of Sarpinsky District in the Republic of Kalmykia
- Coordinates: 47°46′N 44°31′E
- Country: Russia
- Federal subject: Republic of Kalmykia
- Established: 1920
- Administrative center: Sadovoye

Area
  - Total: 3,737.63 km^{2} (1,443.11 sq mi)

Population (2010 Census)
  - Total: 13,796
  - Density: 3.6911/km^{2} (9.5599/sq mi)
  - Urban: 0%
  - Rural: 100%

Administrative structure
  - Administrative divisions: 9 Rural administrations
  - Inhabited localities: 17 rural localities

Municipal structure
  - Municipally incorporated as: Sarpinsky Municipal District
  - Municipal divisions: 0 urban settlements, 9 rural settlements
- Time zone: UTC+3 (MSK)
- OKTMO ID: 85632000
- Website: http://sarpinskoe-rmo.ru

Population of Sarpinsky District
- 2010 Census: 13,796
- 2002 Census: 14,504
- 1989 Census: 17,686
- 1979 Census: 18,276

Sarpinsky District (Russian: Сарпи́нский райо́н; Kalmyk: Сарпан район, Sarpan rayon) is an administrative and municipal district (raion), one of the thirteen in the Republic of Kalmykia, Russia. It is located in the north of the republic. The area of the district is 3,737.63 square kilometers (1,443.11 sq mi). Its administrative center is the rural locality (a selo) of Sadovoye. As of the 2010 Census, the total population of the district was 13,796, with the population of Sadovoye accounting for 47.3% of that number.

== Geography ==
The district is located in the northwest of Kalmykia, in the area of the Yergeni hills. It borders with Maloderbetovsky District in the northeast, Ketchenerovsky District in the southeast, Zavetinskiy District of Rostov Oblast in the southwest, and with Kotelnikovsky and Oktyabrsky districts of Volgograd Oblast in the west. The area of the district is 3,737.63 square kilometers (1,443.11 sq mi).

== History ==
The district was established in 1920.

== Administrative and municipal status ==
Within the framework of administrative divisions, Sarpinsky District is one of the thirteen in the Republic of Kalmykia. The district is divided into nine rural administrations which comprise seventeen rural localities. As a municipal division, the district is incorporated as Sarpinsky Municipal District. Its nine rural administrations are incorporated as nine rural settlements within the municipal district. The selo of Sadovoye serves as the administrative center of both the administrative and municipal district.
