= Morskaya Chapura =

Island in Caspian Sea, Russia

Native name: Морская Чапура
- Location within Caspian Sea
- Interactive map of Morskaya Chapura

Geography
- Location: Caspian Sea
- Type: Lake Island
- Highest elevation: −28–−29 m (−91.8635–−95.1444 ft)

Administration
- Russia

Morskaya Chapura (/mɔːrˈskaɪə tʃəˈpʊərə/, Russian: Морская Чапура) is a coastal island located in the Caspian Sea. It is controlled by the Russian Federation and administered by the Lagansky District under Kalmykia.
