= Ivan Mozgovenko =

Soviet musician and artist (1924–2021)

Ivan Mozgovenko Иван Мозговенко
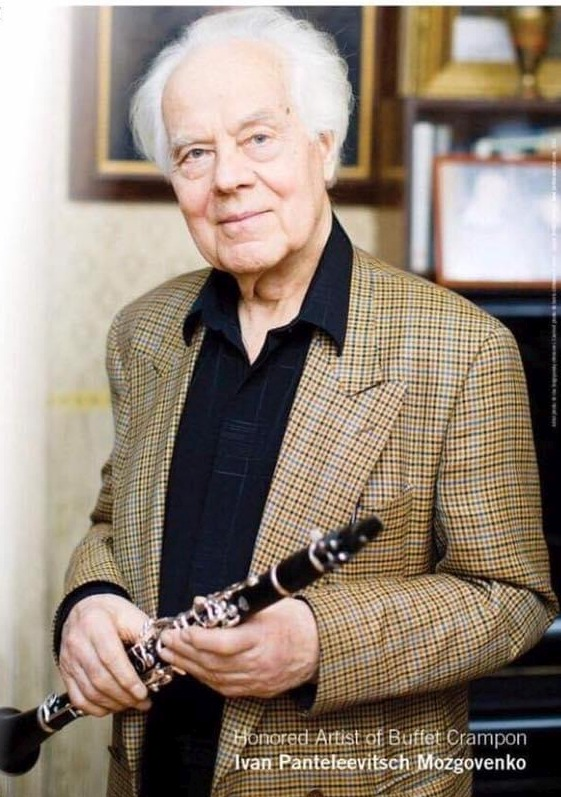
- Mozgovenko, died on 31 December 2021

Background information
- Born: 13 February 1924; Yashalta, Russian SFSR, Soviet Union
- Died: 31 December 2021 (aged 97)
- Genres: Classical
- Occupations: Clarinetist, Academic teacher
- Instrument: Clarinet
- Years active: 1951–2021
- Labels: Melodia, Chandos
- Education: Sverdlovsk Music College; Gnessin State Musical College
- Organization(s): State Symphony Cinema Orchestra; Gnessin State Musical College

Ivan Panteleyevich Mozgovenko (Russian: Иван Пантелеевич Мозговенко; 13 February 1924 – 31 December 2021) was a Soviet and Russian clarinetist and music teacher. He taught clarinet as a professor at the Gnessin State Musical College. For his participation as a soldier in World War II and for his later artistic achievements, he received numerous medals and honorary titles, including the title People's Artist of Russia.

== Biography ==
Mozgovenko was born on 13 February 1924 in Yashalta, Stepnovsky District, Rostov Region, Russian SFSR, USSR (now the Republic of Kalmykia in the Russian Federation). In 1931, his family's property was expropriated and the family was exiled to the Ural region in the area of Nizhny Tagil. From 1939 to 1943, he studied at the Tchaikovsky Music College in Sverdlovsk in the clarinet class. In 1943, he joined the Ural Volunteer Tank Corps, where he served in the medical battalion, fighting from Oryol, Bryansk and Zhitomir to Berlin and Prague. He was offered a commission as his unit demobilized, but continued his musical studies instead.

In 1946, he continued his training as a clarinetist at the Gnessin State Musical College, where he studied with Alexander Leonidovich Shtark (or Stark) (first degree in 1951, the graduate school in 1954). In 1951 he won the first prize at an international competition in Berlin and since worked as a soloist and chamber musician. He played with the Borodin Quartet. From 1953 to 1968, Mozgovenko was principal clarinetist with the State Symphony Cinema Orchestra. In collaboration with the Borodin Quartet and other chamber ensembles, Mozgovenko recorded works by Mozart, Brahms, Prokofiev and some contemporary composers. In addition to his concert activities, Mozgovenko taught at the Gnessin State Musical College since 1951, and as an associate professor since 1966. In 1980 he was awarded the title of professor. His students include many clarinetists and award winners of international competitions. Mozgovenko is also the author of a number of textbooks and transcriptions for clarinet. (Note: The first two paragraphs of this biography were taken from the Russian Wikipedia page.)

Mozgovenko performed with Russian quartets like the Prokofiev, Beethoven, Komitas and Glinka quartets, and with musicians like Svyatoslav Richter, Sergei Prokofiev, Maria Yudina, Van Cliburn and Mstislav Rostropovich.

He collaborated with notable conductors like Yevgeny Svetlanov, Kirill Kondrashin, Alexander Gauk, Leonard Bernstein, Yuri Temirkanov, Vladimir Fedoseyev and Gennady Rozhdestvensky. He trained many musicians, becoming a founder of the Russian clarinet school.

Mozgovenko died on 31 December 2021, at the age of 97.

== Instruments ==
When Mosgowenko began to play the clarinet, the German fingering system for the clarinet dominated in the USSR. In the early 1960s, there was a general changeover to the Boehm system (including the Reform Boehm system, which came closer to the German sound, until the 1980s), which Mozgovenko was unable to avoid. In 1964, he also changed and has been playing Buffet Crampon instruments for many years.

== Significance ==
In Russia, Mozgovenko was considered the father of the current generation of clarinetists. As of 2021, fourteen full or associate professors and 50 prize winners were his students. Mozgovenko said: "I am glad that my students are working all over the world – in the USA, Canada and France. I have celebrated 70 years of teaching at the academy."

In a tribute to his 95th birthday it is reported that he saw himself as the "creative grandson" of the founder of the Russian clarinet school Sergej Sobnow, whom he regarded as the successor to the founder of the clarinet school in Germany Carl Baermann.

On his 90th birthday he performed again. Beginning on the occasion of his 95th birthday, an international clarinet competition named after Mozgovenko has been taking place in Russia since 2019.

Margarita Konstantinovna, one of his former students, has described Mozgovenko as an influential figure in Russian and international music culture, noting his contributions as a performer and teacher, as well as the impact of his pedagogical approach on numerous students.

== Recordings ==
Mosgowenko has made a number of vinyl recordings since 1951. His main recordings are:

1. Mozart's clarinet quintet KV 581 with the Borodin Quartet, with whom he worked from 1951 to 1976. The recording was made in 1961. The artist played a German clarinet at the time and was committed to German clarinet-playing tradition. The recording is still available on CD. OCLC 911356091 (Note: Can be heard on Spotify and Deezer.)
2. the clarinet quintet by Brahms op. 115, also with the Borodin Quartet, recorded in 1969 (with Böhm clarinet), available on CD. OCLC 1251805589
3. the clarinet quintet by the contemporary Russian composer Alexander Lokshin, recorded in 1960 with the Komitas Quartet, available on CD. OCLC 981897726
4. Sergei Prokofjew, Overture on Hebrew themes op. 34, with Sviatoslav Richter, Piano, in: Sviatoslav Richter – Plays Rakhmaninov & Prokofiev, 11 CDs, CD Nr. 11/1 OCLC 1196239639 (another compilation: OCLC 10321306)

There are also a number of radio recordings.
