= Laggan =

Laggan (Lagan, Gaelic for 'little hollow') may refer to:

== Scotland ==
- Laggan, Badenoch
- Laggan, Great Glen (consisting of North Laggan and South Laggan)
- Laggan, Islay
- Laggan Dam on the River Spean south west of Loch Laggan
- Kinloch Laggan, hamlet at the north end of Loch Laggan
- Loch Laggan, Highland
- River Laggan, Islay

== Outside Scotland ==
- Laggan, New South Wales, Australia
- Laggan, County Donegal, Ireland, see Porthall
- Lagganstown, County Tipperary, Ireland
- Lake Louise, Alberta, formerly named Laggan

== Other uses ==
- Laggan Army

== See also ==
- Lagan (disambiguation)
