= Tselinny District, Republic of Kalmykia =

Tselinny District Целинный район (Russian)
- District

Other transcription(s)
  - Kalmyk: Целинн район
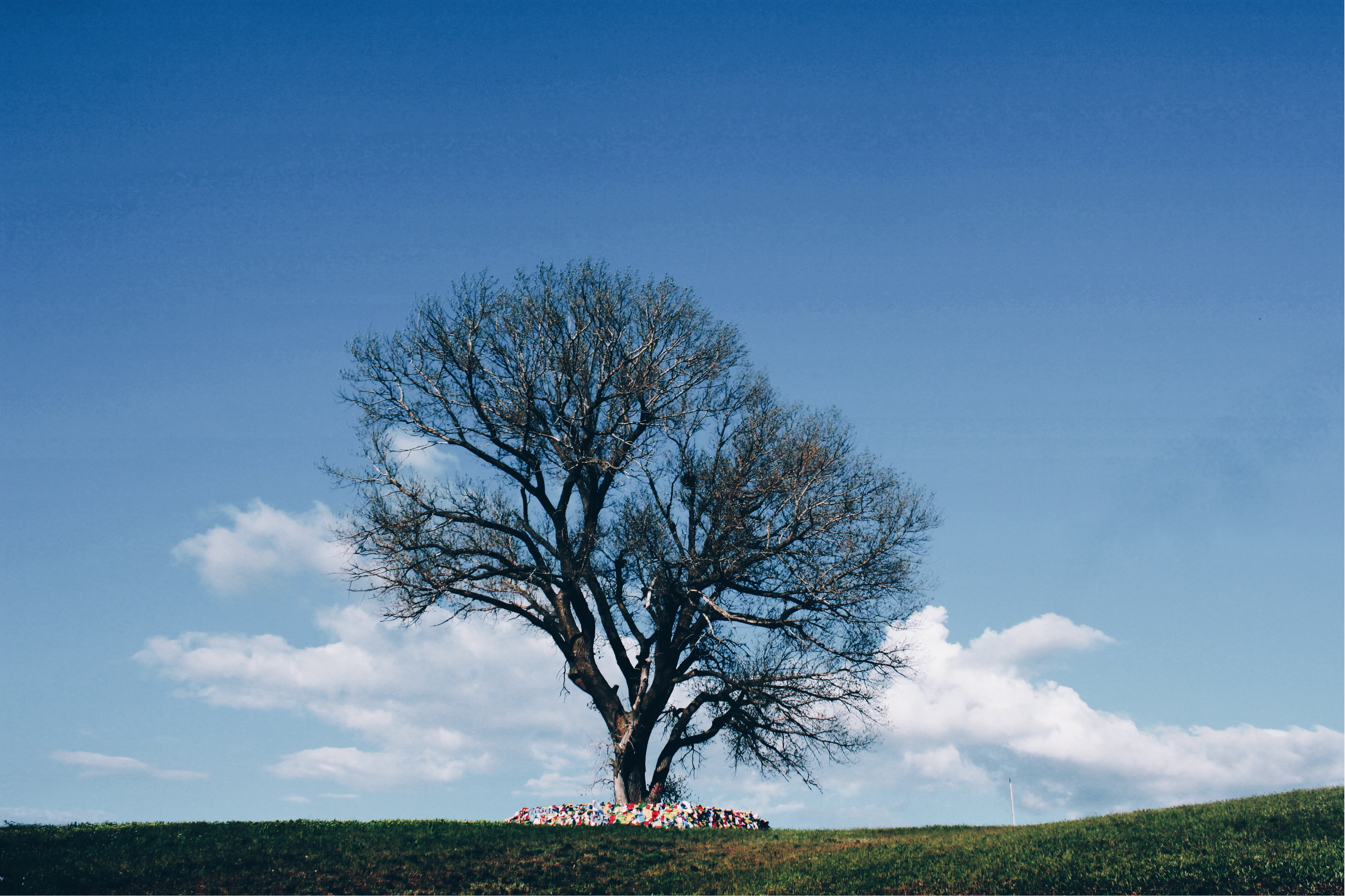
- A lone poplar, a protected area of Russia in Tselinny District

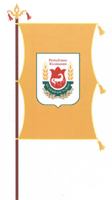
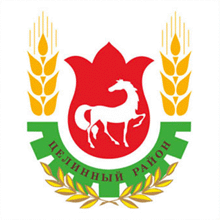
- Flag Coat of arms
- Location of Tselinny District in the Republic of Kalmykia
- Coordinates: 46°25′N 44°15′E
- Country: Russia
- Federal subject: Republic of Kalmykia
- Established: 1938
- Administrative center: Troitskoye

Area
  - Total: 5,258.18 km^{2} (2,030.19 sq mi)

Population (2010 Census)
  - Total: 20,051
  - Density: 3.8133/km^{2} (9.8764/sq mi)
  - Urban: 0%
  - Rural: 100%

Administrative structure
  - Administrative divisions: 11 rural administration
  - Inhabited localities: 25 rural localities

Municipal structure
  - Municipally incorporated as: Tselinny Municipal District
  - Municipal divisions: 0 urban settlements, 11 rural settlements
- Time zone: UTC+3 (MSK)
- OKTMO ID: 85637000
- Website: http://celinrmo.rk08.ru

Population of Tselinny District
- 2010 Census: 20,051
- 2002 Census: 19,090
- 1989 Census: 22,384
- 1979 Census: 20,803

Tselinny District (Russian: Цели́нный райо́н; Kalmyk: Целинн район Ţelinn rayon) is an administrative and municipal district (raion), one of the thirteen in the Republic of Kalmykia, Russia. Its administrative center is the rural locality (a selo) of Troitskoye. As of the 2010 census, the total population of the district was 20,051, with the population of Troitskoye accounting for 59.6%.

== Geography ==
The district is located in the west of Kalmykia, in the area of the Yergeni hills. The area of the district is 5,258.18 square kilometers (2,030.19 sq mi).

== History ==
The district was established in 1938.

== Population ==
Ethnic composition (2021):

- Kalmyks – 64.5%
- Russians – 29.1%
- Dargins – 2.9%
- Chechens – 1.4%
- Others – 2.1%

== Administrative and municipal status ==
Within the framework of administrative divisions, Tselinny District is one of the thirteen in the Republic of Kalmykia. The district is divided into eleven rural administrations which comprise twenty-five rural localities. As a municipal division, the district is incorporated as Tselinny Municipal District. Its eleven rural administrations are incorporated as eleven rural settlements within the municipal district. The selo of Troitskoye serves as the administrative center of both the administrative and municipal district.
