= Iki-Burul =

Settlement in Republic of Kalmykia, Russia

Coordinates: 45°49′13″N 44°38′24″E

Iki-Burul (Russian: И́ки-Буру́л; Kalmyk: Ики Бурул İki Burul) is a settlement and the administrative center of Iki-Burulsky District and Iki-Burulsky rural locality of the Republic of Kalmykia in the Russian Federation. It is located 62 kilometres (39 mi) southeast of the Kalmyk capital of Elista in the southeastern part of Yergeni Hills. On 1 January 2012, its population was 4,095 souls.

In 1929, the settlement was founded as a kolkhoz. On 1941 maps, the settlement was called Chonyn Sala (Russian: Чонин-Сала Čonin-Sala; Kalmyk: Чонын Сала Čonyn Sala). During World War II in the summer of 1942, the village was occupied by the German Wehrmacht during operation Case Blue. On 28 December 1943 the ethnic Kalmyk population of the village was deported to Siberia by Soviet authorities and the area was transferred to Stavropol Territory. By 1946, the village had begun to be designated by its present name. After their return from exile in 1957, Kalmyks began restoration of the war-ruined economy. In January 1965, a new district (raion) centered on Iki-Burul was established.
