= Lagansky =

Lagansky (masculine), Laganskaya (feminine), or Laganskoye (neuter) may refer to:

- Lagansky District, a district of the Republic of Kalmykia, Russia
- Laganskoye Urban Settlement, a municipal formation which the Town of Lagan in Lagansky District of the Republic of Kalmykia, Russia is incorporated as
