= Sadovoye, Republic of Kalmykia =

Sadovoye Садовое
- Location of Sadovoye
- Location of Sadovoye Sadovoye (Kalmykia)
- Coordinates: 47°46′25″N 44°30′46″E
- Country: Russia
- Federal subject: Kalmykia
- Administrative district: Sarpinsky District
- Rural okrug: Sadovoye Village
- Founded: 1849
- Elevation: 32 m (105 ft)

Population (2010 Census)
  - Total: 6,530

Administrative status
  - Capital of: Sadovoye Village
- Time zone: UTC+3 (MSK)
- Postal code(s): 359410
- OKTMO ID: 85632455101

Sadovoye (Russian: Садо́вое) is a rural locality (a selo) and administrative center of Sarpinsky District, Republic of Kalmykia, Russia. Population: 6,530 (2010 Census); .

== Population ==
Population dynamics:

1859	1897	1900	1904	1908	1914
788	1506	2405	2716	3064	3837
