= Iki-Burulsky District =

Iki-Burulsky District Ики-Бурульский район (Russian)
- District

Other transcription(s)
  - Kalmyk: Ик Бурла район
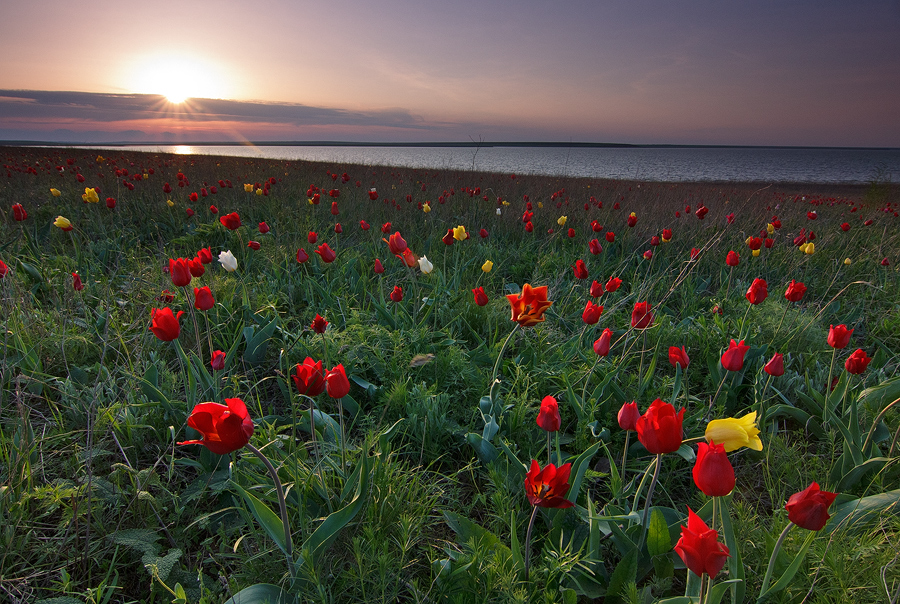
- A tulip island, a protected area of Russia in Iki-Burulsky District
- Location of Iki-Burulsky District in the Republic of Kalmykia
- Coordinates: 45°49′N 44°38′E
- Country: Russia
- Federal subject: Republic of Kalmykia
- Established: 1965
- Administrative center: Iki-Burul

Area
  - Total: 6,363.32 km^{2} (2,456.89 sq mi)

Population (2010 Census)
  - Total: 11,424
  - Density: 1.7953/km^{2} (4.6498/sq mi)
  - Urban: 0%
  - Rural: 100%

Administrative structure
  - Administrative divisions: 13 Rural administrations
  - Inhabited localities: 28 rural localities

Municipal structure
  - Municipally incorporated as: Iki-Burulsky Municipal District
  - Municipal divisions: 0 urban settlements, 13 rural settlements
- Time zone: UTC+3 (MSK)
- OKTMO ID: 85610000
- Website: http://iki-burul.rk08.ru

Population of Iki-Burulsky District
- 2010 Census: 11,424
- 2002 Census: 11,323
- 1989 Census: 16,453
- 1979 Census: 15,633

Iki-Burulsky District (Russian: И́ки-Буру́льский райо́н; Kalmyk: Ик Буурла район, İk Buurla rayon, [ˈikə ˈbuːrla rɐˈjon]) is an administrative and municipal district (raion), one of the thirteen in the Republic of Kalmykia, Russia. Its administrative center is the rural locality (a settlement) of Iki-Burul. As of the 2010 Census, the total population of the district was 11,424, with the population of Iki-Burul accounting for 35.5% of that number.

== Geography ==
The district is located in the southwest of Kalmykia, in the area of the Yergeni hills. The area of the district is 6,363.32 square kilometers (2,456.89 sq mi).

== History ==
The district was established in 1965.

== Administrative and municipal status ==
Within the framework of administrative divisions, Iki-Burulsky District is one of the thirteen in the Republic of Kalmykia. The district is divided into thirteen rural administrations which comprise twenty-eight rural localities. As a municipal division, the district is incorporated as Iki-Burulsky Municipal District. Its thirteen rural administrations are incorporated as thirteen rural settlements within the municipal district. The settlement of Iki-Burul serves as the administrative center of both the administrative and municipal district.
