= Troitskoye, Republic of Kalmykia =

Rural locality in Kalmykia, Russia

Coordinates: 46°24′59″N 44°15′17″E

Troitskoye (Russian: Тро́ицкое, Kalmyk: Булһн, Bulğn) is a rural locality (a selo) and the administrative center of Tselinny District of the Republic of Kalmykia, Russia. Population: 11,943 (2010 census); 10,298 (2002 census); 8,717 (1989 Soviet census).
