= Tsagan Aman =

Rural locality in Kalmykia, Russia

Coordinates: 47°33′43″N 46°43′10″E

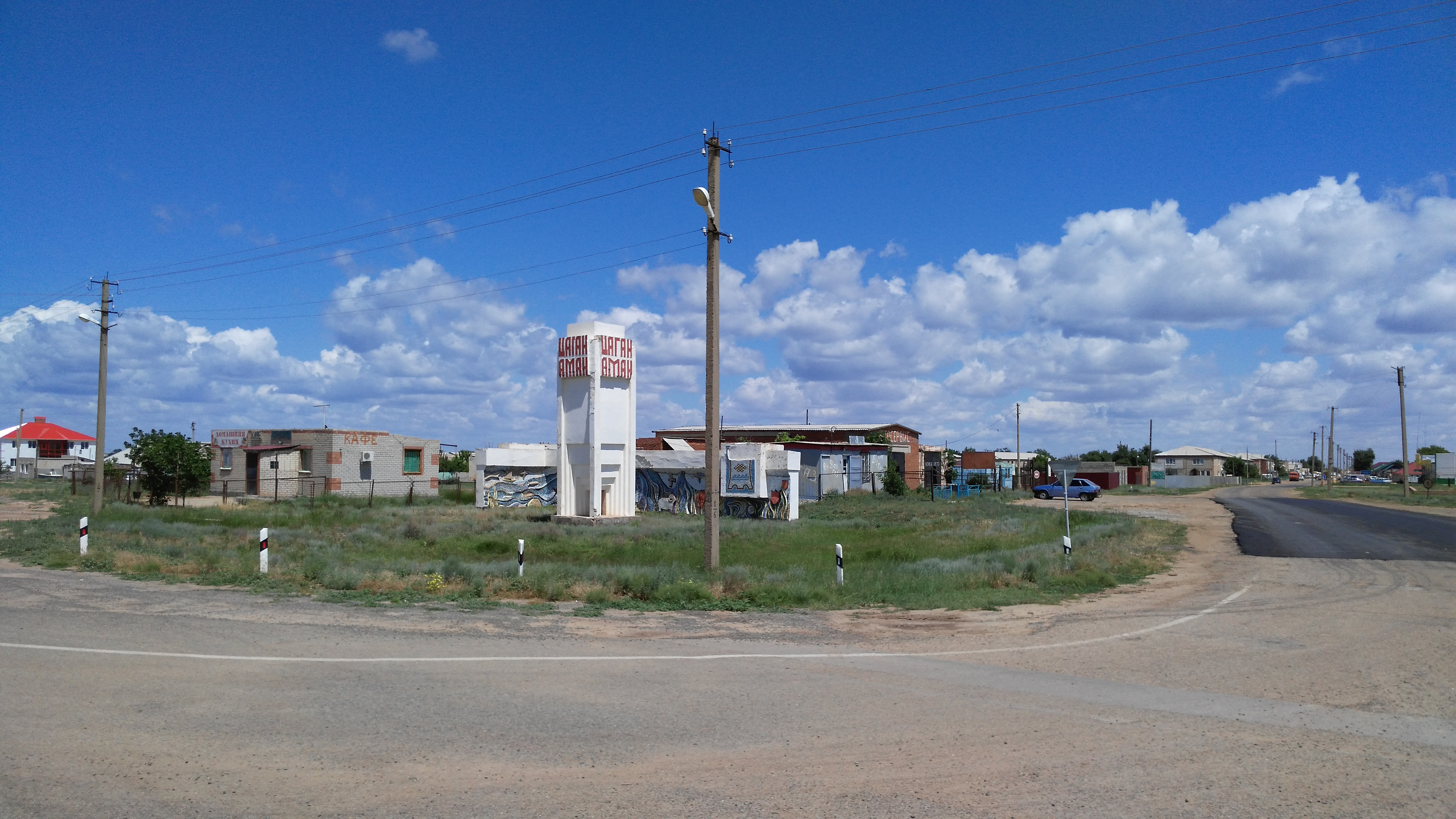
View of the village of Tsagan Aman from the side of the M-6 highway

Tsagan Aman (Russian: Цаган Аман, Kalmyk: Цаһан Аман, Tsağan Aman) is a rural locality (a settlement) and the administrative center of Yustinsky District and of the Tsagan Aman Rural Settlement in the Republic of Kalmykia, Russia. It is the only settlement in the Republic of Kalmykia on the Volga River, and is located about 300 kilometres (190 mi) northeast of Elista. Tsagan Aman was founded in 1798. Population: 6,027 (2010 census); 5,926 (2002 census); 6,545 (1989 Soviet census).
