= Yustinsky District =

Yustinsky District Юстинский район (Russian)
- District

Other transcription(s)
  - Kalmyk: Үстин район
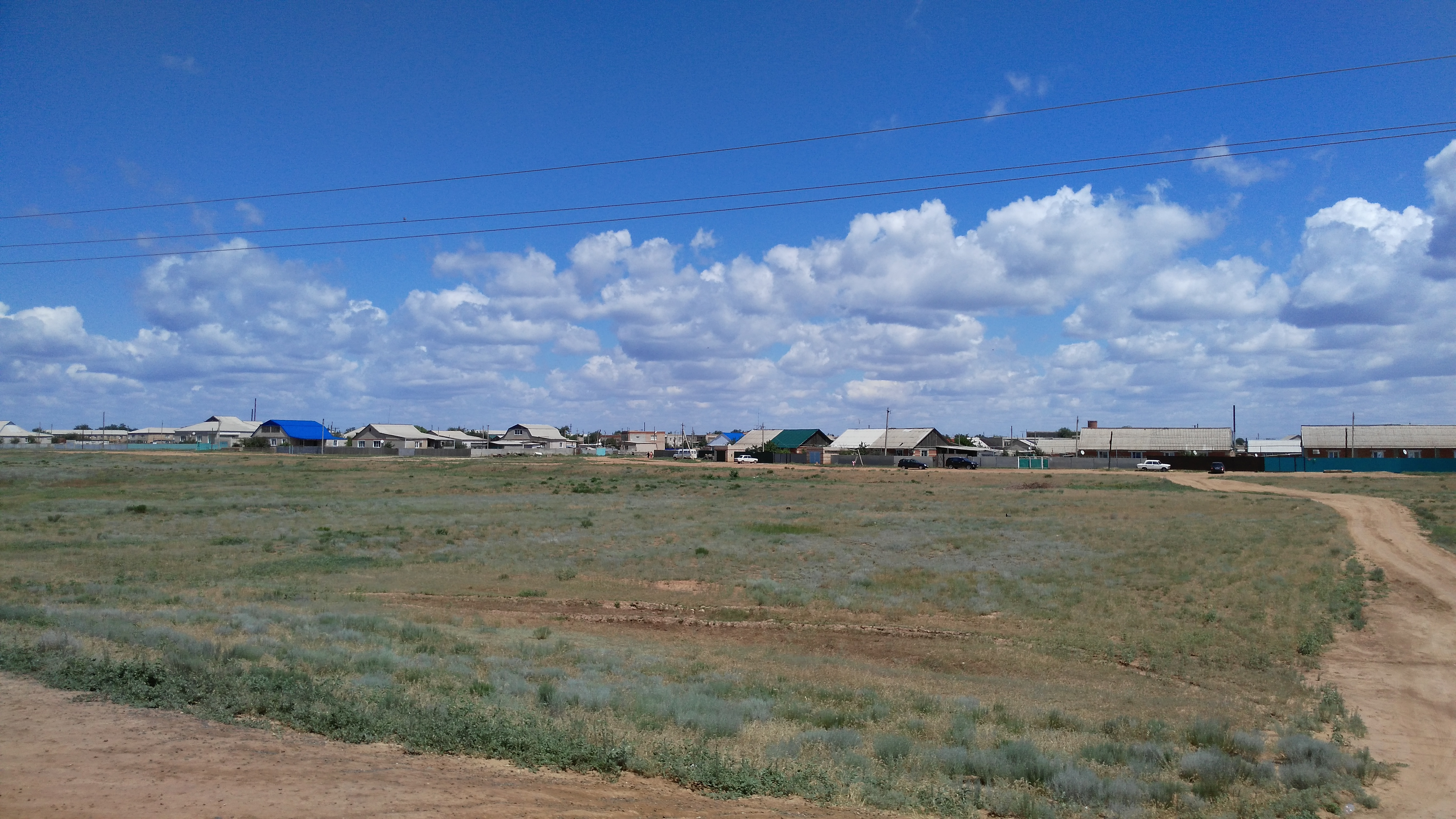
- Village of Tsagan Aman, Yustinsky District
- Location of Yustinsky District in the Republic of Kalmykia
- Coordinates: 47°33′N 46°43′E
- Country: Russia
- Federal subject: Republic of Kalmykia
- Established: 1938
- Administrative center: Tsagan Aman

Area
  - Total: 7,995.61 km^{2} (3,087.12 sq mi)

Population (2010 Census)
  - Total: 10,585
  - Density: 1.3239/km^{2} (3.4288/sq mi)
  - Urban: 0%
  - Rural: 100%

Administrative structure
  - Administrative divisions: 7 Rural administrations
  - Inhabited localities: 14 rural localities

Municipal structure
  - Municipally incorporated as: Yustinsky Municipal District
  - Municipal divisions: 0 urban settlements, 7 rural settlements
- Time zone: UTC+3 (MSK)
- OKTMO ID: 85646000
- Website: http://85246.rk08.ru

Population of Yustinsky District
- 2010 Census: 10,585
- 2002 Census: 10,506
- 1989 Census: 15,568
- 1979 Census: 13,941

Yustinsky District (Russian: Юсти́нский райо́н; Kalmyk: Үстин район, Üstin rayon) is an administrative and municipal district (raion), one of the thirteen in the Republic of Kalmykia, Russia. It is located in the northeast and east of the republic. The area of the district is 7,995.61 square kilometers (3,087.12 sq mi). Its administrative center is the rural locality (a settlement) of Tsagan Aman. As of the 2010 Census, the total population of the district was 10,585, with the population of Tsagan Aman accounting for 56.9% of that number.

== History ==
The district was established in 1938.

== Administrative and municipal status ==
Within the framework of administrative divisions, Yustinsky District is one of the thirteen in the Republic of Kalmykia. The district is divided into seven rural administrations which comprise fourteen rural localities. As a municipal division, the district is incorporated as Yustinsky Municipal District. Its seven rural administrations are incorporated as seven rural settlements within the municipal district. The settlement of Tsagan Aman serves as the administrative center of both the administrative and municipal district.
