= Ketchenerovsky District =

Ketchenerovsky District Кетченеровский район (Russian)
- District

Other transcription(s)
  - Kalmyk: Көтчнрә район
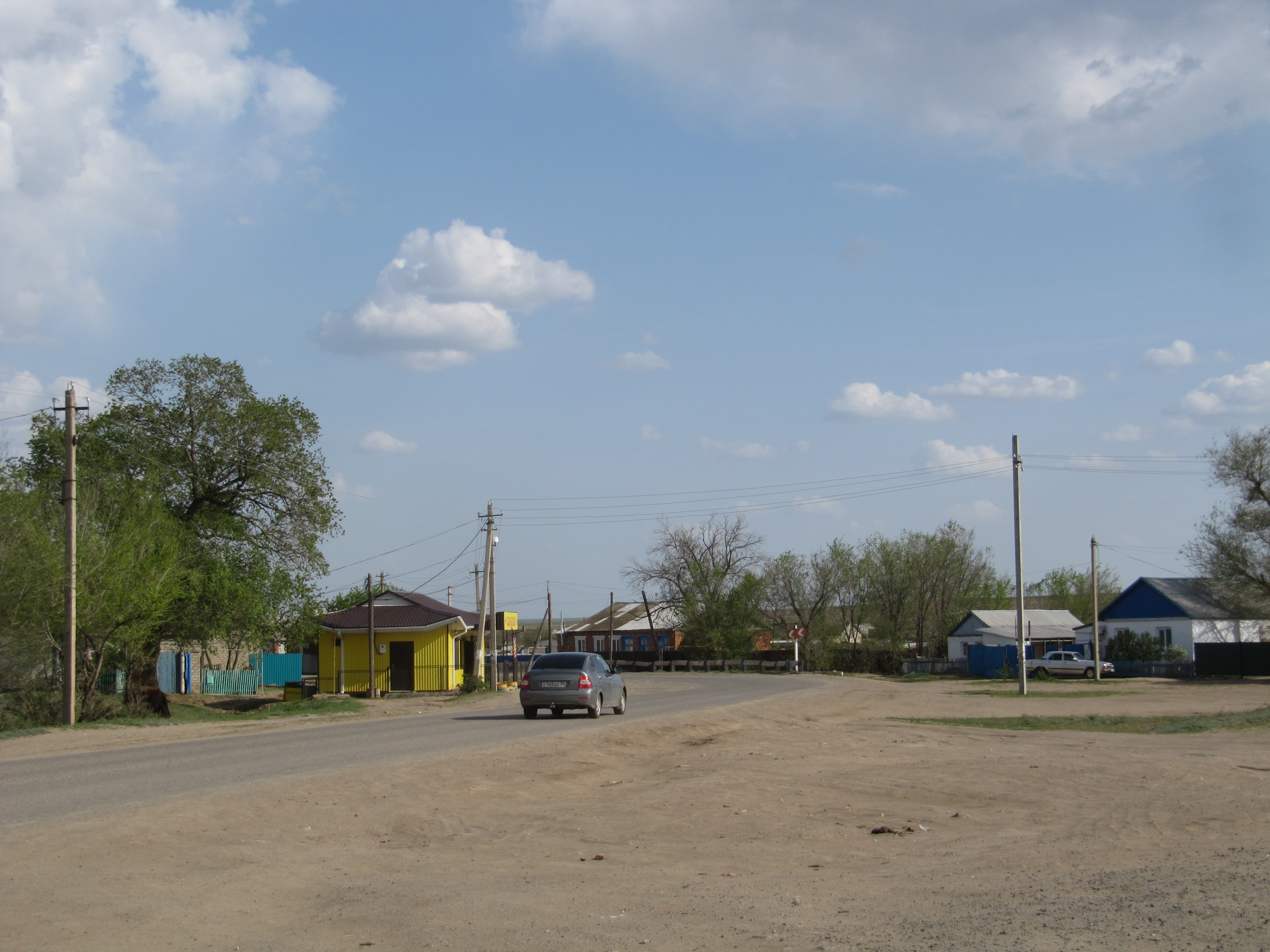
- Ketchenery, Ketchenerovsky District

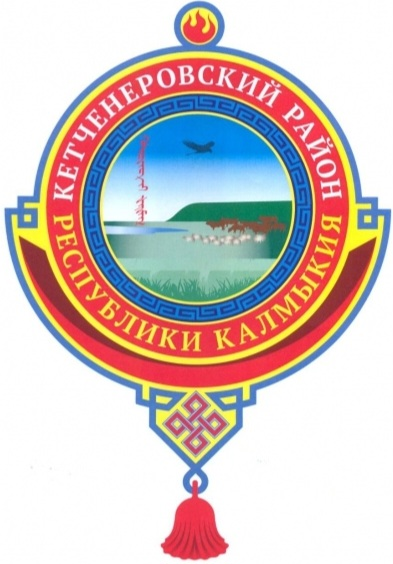
- Coat of arms
- Location of Ketchenerovsky District in the Republic of Kalmykia
- Coordinates: 47°18′N 44°31′E
- Country: Russia
- Federal subject: Republic of Kalmykia
- Established: 1938
- Administrative center: Ketchenery

Area
  - Total: 6,547.91 km^{2} (2,528.16 sq mi)

Population (2010 Census)
  - Total: 10,622
  - Density: 1.6222/km^{2} (4.2015/sq mi)
  - Urban: 0%
  - Rural: 100%

Administrative structure
  - Administrative divisions: 9 Rural administrations
  - Inhabited localities: 22 rural localities

Municipal structure
  - Municipally incorporated as: Ketchenerovsky Municipal District
  - Municipal divisions: 0 urban settlements, 9 rural settlements
- Time zone: UTC+3 (MSK)
- OKTMO ID: 85625000
- Website: http://ketrmork.ru/struktura-i-funkcii.html

Population of Ketchenerovsky District
- 2010 Census: 10,622
- 2002 Census: 11,049
- 1989 Census: 15,263
- 1979 Census: 14,867

Ketchenerovsky District (Russian: Кетчене́ровский райо́н; Kalmyk: Көтчнрә район, Kötçnrä rayon) is an administrative and municipal district (raion), one of the thirteen in the Republic of Kalmykia, Russia. It is located in the northwest of the republic. Its administrative center is the rural locality (a settlement) of Ketchenery. As of the 2010 Census, the total population of the district was 10,622, with the population of Ketchenery accounting for 36.8% of that number.

== Geography ==
The district is located in the northwest of Kalmykia, in the area of the Yergeni hills. The area of the district is 6,547.91 square kilometers (2,528.16 sq mi).

== History ==
The district was established in 1938. Until 1990, it was called Priozyorny District (Приозёрный район; Kalmyk: Приозёрн район, Priozërn rajon).

== Administrative and municipal status ==
Within the framework of administrative divisions, Ketchenerovsky District is one of the thirteen in the Republic of Kalmykia. The district is divided into nine rural administrations which comprise twenty-two rural localities. As a municipal division, the district is incorporated as Ketchenerovsky Municipal District. Its nine rural administrations are incorporated as nine rural settlements within the municipal district. The settlement of Ketchenery serves as the administrative center of both the administrative and municipal district.
