= Kalmyk Steppe =

Steppe in Astrakhan Oblast, Russia

Coordinates: 46°N 46°E

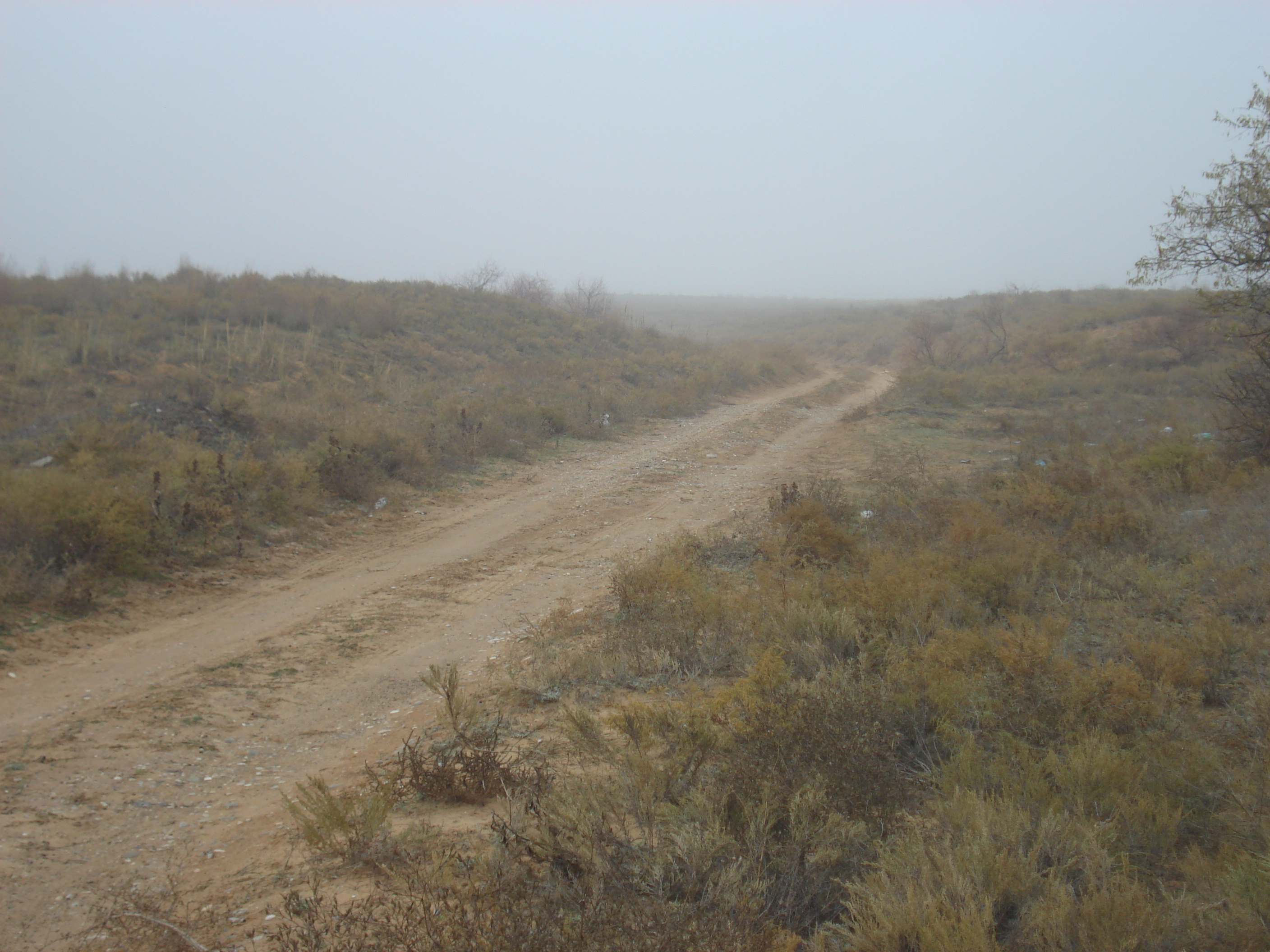
Kalmyk Steppe

Kalmuk Steppe, or Kalmyk Steppe is a steppe with a land area of approximately 100,000 km^{2}, bordering the northwest Caspian Sea, bounded by the Volga on the northeast, the Manych on the southwest, and the territory of the Don Cossacks on the northwest. The historic home to the Kalmuck or Kalmyks, it is in the Federal subject of Astrakhan Oblast in Russia. Before the appearance of the Kalmyks to this region, the area was long known as the Povoletsk steppe by the Russians.

The western Kalmuk Steppe occupied by the Yergeni hills, is deeply trenched by ravines and rises between 91 and 192 metres (300 and 630 feet) above the sea. It is built up of Tertiary deposits, belonging to the Sarmatian division of the Miocene period and covered with bess and black earth, and its escarpments represent the old shore-line of the Caspian. No Caspian deposits are found on or within the Yergeni. These hills exhibit the usual black earth flora, and they have a settled population.

The eastern part of the steppe is a plain, lying for the most part 9 to 12 metres (30 to 40 feet) below the level of the sea and sloping gently towards the Volga. Post-Pliocene Aral-Caspian deposits, containing the usual fossils (Hydrobia, Neritina, eight species of Cardium, two of Dreissena, three of Adacna and Lithoglyphus caspius), attain thicknesses varying from 32 m (105 ft) to 2 or 3 m (7 or 10 ft), and disappear in places. Lacustrine and fluviatile mineral deposits occur intermingled with the above. Large areas of moving sands exist near Enotayevsk, where high dunes or barkhans have been formed.

A narrow tract of land along the coast of the Caspian, known as the "hillocks of Baer," is covered with hillocks elongated from west to east, perpendicularly to the coast-line, the spaces between them being filled with water or overgrown with thickets of reed, Salix, Ulmus campestris, almond trees, &c. An archipelago of little islands is thus formed close to the shore by these mounds, which are backed on the north and northwest by strings of salt lakes, partly desiccated. Small streams originate in the Yergeni, but are lost as soon as they reach the lowlands, where water can only be obtained from wells. The scanty vegetation is a mixture of the flora of south-east Russia and that of the deserts of central Asia.

As of 1911, the steppe had an estimated population of 130,000 persons, living in over 27,700 kibitkas, or felt tents. There were many Buddhist monasteries. Parts of the Kalmucks were settled (chiefly in the hilly parts), the remainder being nomads. Antony Beevor, in his 1998 book Stalingrad, said that "Russians from the north thought of [Kalmyk Steppe] as 'the end of the world'". In 1943 the people were forcibly deported (see Kalmykia).

== See also ==
- Kalmykia The Kalmyk Steppe was partly occupied by Germans in August–December 1942, and by the Abwehr until November 1943.
