= Bolshoy Tsaryn =

Rural locality in Kalmykia, Russia

Coordinates: 47°51′13″N 45°25′39″E

Bolshoy Tsaryn (Russian: Большо́й Цары́н, Kalmyk: Ик Царың, İk ţarıñ) is a rural locality (a settlement) and the administrative center of Oktyabrsky District of the Republic of Kalmykia, Russia. Population: 5,497 (2010 census); 5,070 (2002 census); 5,772 (1989 Soviet census).
