= Yashaltinsky District =

Yashaltinsky District Яшалтинский район (Russian)
- District

Other transcription(s)
  - Kalmyk: Яшалтан район
- Location of Yashaltinsky District in the Republic of Kalmykia
- Coordinates: 46°20′N 42°16′E
- Country: Russia
- Federal subject: Republic of Kalmykia
- Established: 1938
- Administrative center: Yashalta

Area
  - Total: 2,415.84 km^{2} (932.76 sq mi)

Population (2010 Census)
  - Total: 17,178
  - Density: 7.1106/km^{2} (18.416/sq mi)
  - Urban: 0%
  - Rural: 100%

Administrative structure
  - Administrative divisions: 11 Rural administrations
  - Inhabited localities: 24 rural localities

Municipal structure
  - Municipally incorporated as: Yashaltinsky Municipal District
  - Municipal divisions: 0 urban settlements, 11 rural settlements
- Time zone: UTC+3 (MSK)
- OKTMO ID: 85650000
- Website: http://85250.rk08.ru

Population of Yashaltinsky District
- 2010 Census: 17,178
- 2002 Census: 17,753
- 1989 Census: 18,644
- 1979 Census: 19,622

Yashaltinsky District (Russian: Яшалти́нский райо́н; Kalmyk: Яшалтан район, Yaşaltan rayon) is an administrative and municipal district (raion), one of the thirteen in the Republic of Kalmykia, Russia. It is located in the west of the republic. The area of the district is 2,415.84 square kilometers (932.76 sq mi). Its administrative center is the rural locality (a selo) of Yashalta. As of the 2010 Census, the total population of the district was 17,178, with the population of Yashalta accounting for 27.5% of that number.

== History ==
The district was established in 1938.

== Administrative and municipal status ==
Within the framework of administrative divisions, Yashaltinsky District is one of the thirteen in the Republic of Kalmykia. The district is divided into eleven rural administrations which comprise twenty-four rural localities. As a municipal division, the district is incorporated as Yashaltinsky Municipal District. Its eleven rural administrations are incorporated as eleven rural settlements within the municipal district. The selo of Yashalta serves as the administrative center of both the administrative and municipal district.
