= Mayovka, Kaliningrad Oblast =

Mayovka Маёвка
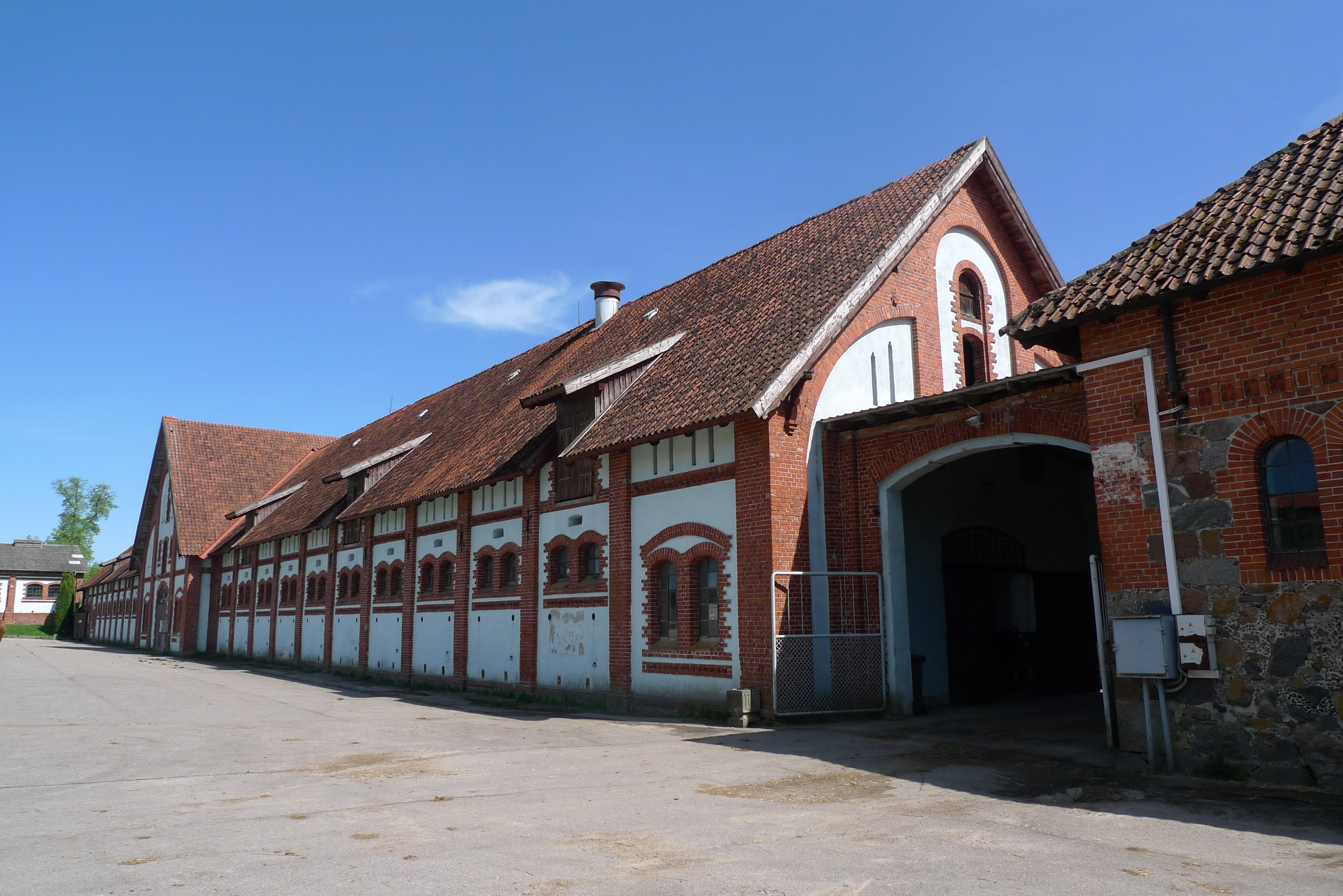
- Old stud farm
- Interactive map of Mayovka
- Location of Mayovka Mayovka (European Russia) Mayovka (Russia)
- Coordinates: 54°38′N 21°48′E
- Country: Russia
- Federal subject: Kaliningrad Oblast
- Administrative district: Chernyakhovsky District
- Postal code: 238170

Mayovka (Russian: Маёвка, German: Georgenburg, Lithuanian: Jurbarkas) was a rural locality in Chernyakhovsky District of Kaliningrad Oblast, Russia. Located about 10 kilometers (6.2 mi) northwest of the town of Chernyakhovsk, it was merged into Chernyakhovsk and ceased to exist as a separate locality in June 1996. It is located in the region of Lithuania Minor.

== History ==
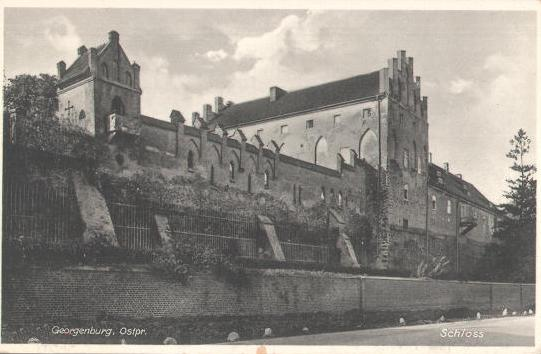
The castle in 1907

It was founded around the Ordensburg fortress Georgenburg ("George's castle") by the Teutonic Order. This fortress is still the best preserved medieval castle in the oblast. The village became famous from a local stable for the Trakehner horse breed. Lithuanian and German church services were held at the local church. In the 1880s, it had a population of 446, entirely Lutheran by confession.

The town became a part of the Soviet Union in 1945 following World War II and was repopulated with Russians. It was given its present name, which means a celebration of the International Workers' Day (May 1) in Russian.
