= Lagganstown =

Coordinates: 52°27′44.3″N 7°58′21.4″W

Lagganstown is an area in County Tipperary, Ireland. Lagganstown Upper (Irish: Baile an Logáin Uachtarach) and Lagganstown Lower (Baile an Logáin Íochtarach) are townlands within the civil parish of Relickmurry and Athassel and historical barony of Clanwilliam.
