= Yashalta =

Rural locality in Kalmykia, Russia

Yashalta Яшалта
- Interactive map of Yashalta
- Location of Yashalta
- Coordinates: 46°20′22″N 42°16′34″E
- Country: Russia
- Federal subject: Kalmykia
- Founded: 1877
- Elevation: 42 m (138 ft)

Population
  - Estimate (2025): 4,253 )
- Time zone: UTC+3 (MSK)
- Postal code: 359010
- OKTMO ID: 85650480101

Yashalta (Russian: Яшалта́, Kalmyk: Яшалта, Yaşalta) is a rural locality (a selo) and the administrative center of Yashaltinsky District of the Republic of Kalmykia, Russia. Population: 4,716 (2010 census); 4,851 (2002 census); 4,996 (1989 Soviet census).

== History ==
It was established in 1877 by Estonians and was originally called Esto-Khaginskoye (Эсто-Хагинское, Estonian: Eesti-Haginsk).
