= Oktyabrsky District, Republic of Kalmykia =

Oktyabrsky District Октябрьский район (Russian)
- District

Other transcription(s)
  - Kalmyk: Октябрин район
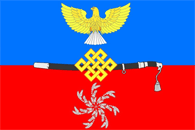
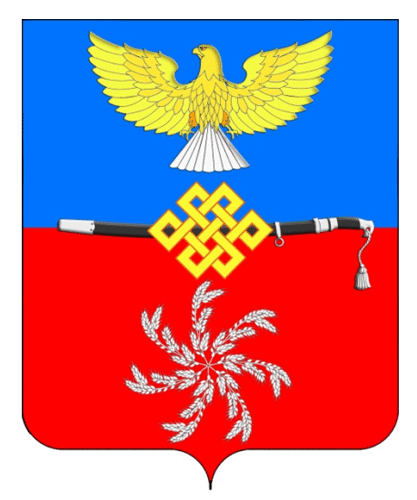
- Flag Coat of arms
- Location of Oktyabrsky District in the Republic of Kalmykia
- Coordinates: 47°51′N 45°26′E
- Country: Russia
- Federal subject: Republic of Kalmykia
- Established: 1977
- Administrative center: Bolshoy Tsaryn

Area
  - Total: 3,680.58 km^{2} (1,421.08 sq mi)

Population (2010 Census)
  - Total: 9,438
  - Density: 2.564/km^{2} (6.641/sq mi)
  - Urban: 0%
  - Rural: 100%

Administrative structure
  - Administrative divisions: 7 Rural administrations
  - Inhabited localities: 12 rural localities

Municipal structure
  - Municipally incorporated as: Oktyabrsky Municipal District
  - Municipal divisions: 0 urban settlements, 7 rural settlements
- Time zone: UTC+3 (MSK)
- OKTMO ID: 85623000
- Website: http://oktrmo.ru

Population of Oktyabrsky District
- 2010 Census: 9,438
- 2002 Census: 9,213
- 1989 Census: 12,633
- 1979 Census: 12,124

Oktyabrsky District (Russian: Октя́брьский райо́н; Kalmyk: Октябрин район, Oktyabrin rayon) is an administrative and municipal district (raion), one of the thirteen in the Republic of Kalmykia, Russia. It is located in the north of the republic. The area of the district is 3,680.58 square kilometers (1,421.08 sq mi). Its administrative center is the rural locality (a settlement) of Bolshoy Tsaryn. As of the 2010 Census, the total population of the district was 9,438, with the population of Bolshoy Tsaryn accounting for 58.2% of that number.

== History ==
The district was established in 1977.

== Administrative and municipal status ==
Within the framework of administrative divisions, Oktyabrsky District is one of the thirteen in the Republic of Kalmykia. The district is divided into seven rural administrations which comprise twelve rural localities. As a municipal division, the district is incorporated as Oktyabrsky Municipal District. Its seven rural administrations are incorporated as seven rural settlements within the municipal district. The settlement of Bolshoy Tsaryn serves as the administrative center of both the administrative and municipal district.
