= Ketchenery =

Rural locality in Kalmykia, Russia

Coordinates: 47°18′29″N 44°31′23″E

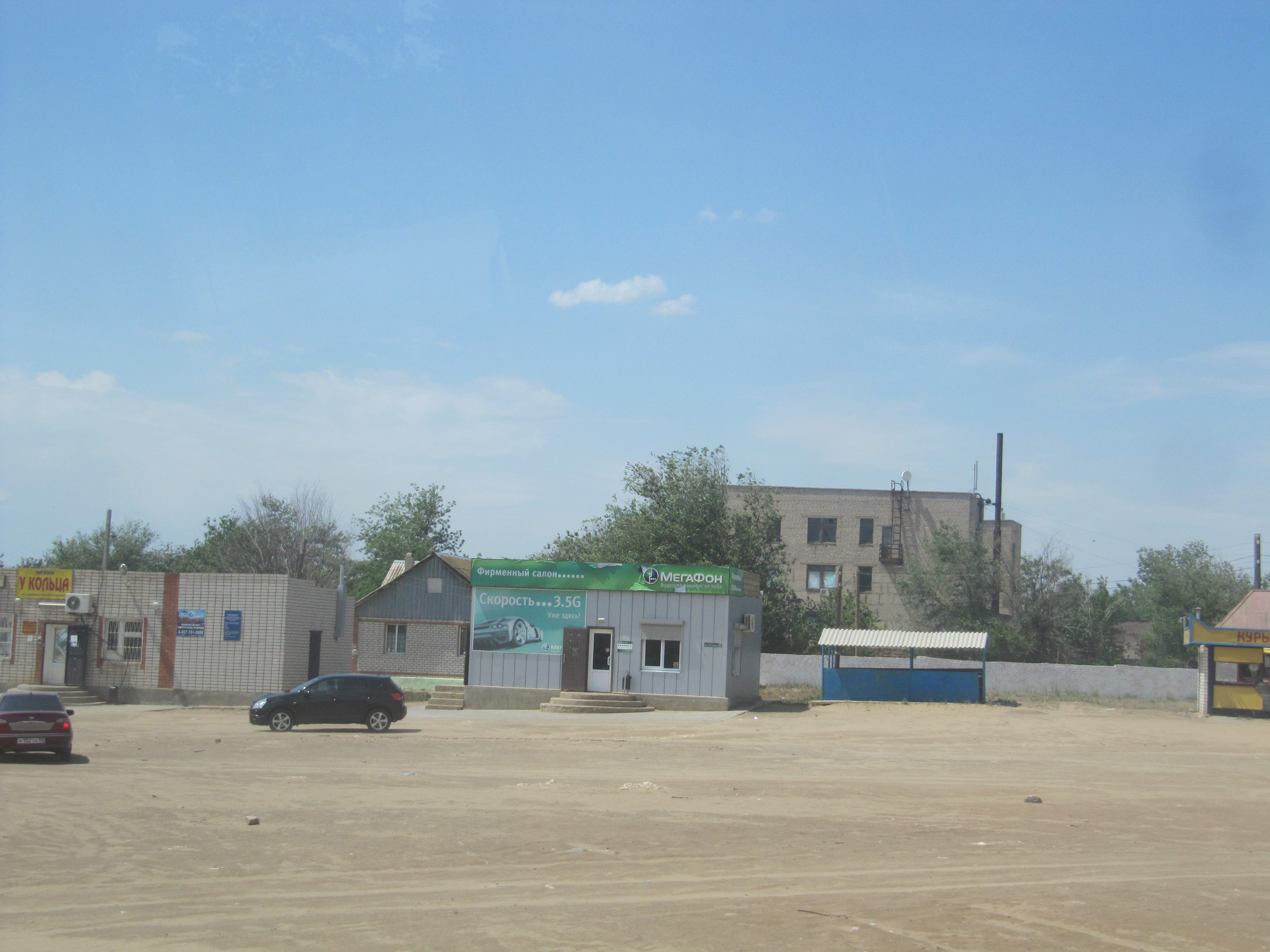
Area of Ketchenery Village, Kalmykia, Russia

Ketchenery (Russian: Кетчене́ры, Kalmyk: Көтчнр, Kötçnr) is a rural locality (a settlement) and the administrative center of Ketchenerovsky District of the Republic of Kalmykia, Russia. Population: 3,908 (2010 census); 3,938 (2002 census); 4,940 (1989 Soviet census).
