= Mayovka =

Type of picnic during the Russian Empire

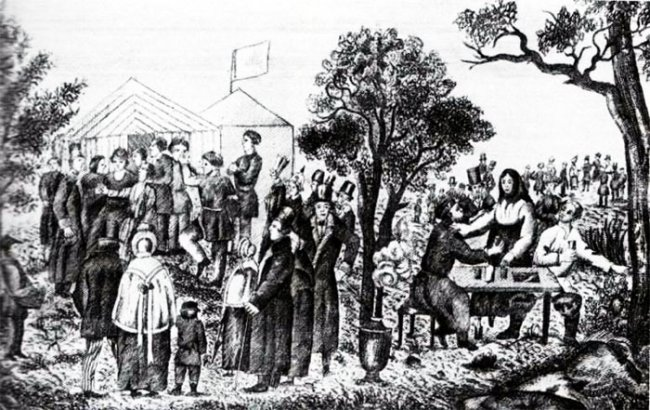
Public festivities in Sokolniki on May 1

In the context of the late Russian Empire, a mayovka (Russian: маёвка, IPA: [mɐˈjɵfkə]) was a picnic in the countryside or in a park in the early days of May. Eventually, "mayovka" came to mean an illegal celebration of May 1 by revolutionary dissidents, typically presented as an innocent picnic. After the revolution, this proletarian mayovka merged into Labour Day.
