= Gorodovikovsk =

Town in the Republic of Kalmykia, Russia

Gorodovikovsk Городовиковск
- Town

Other transcription(s)
  - Kalmyk: Бәәшңтә
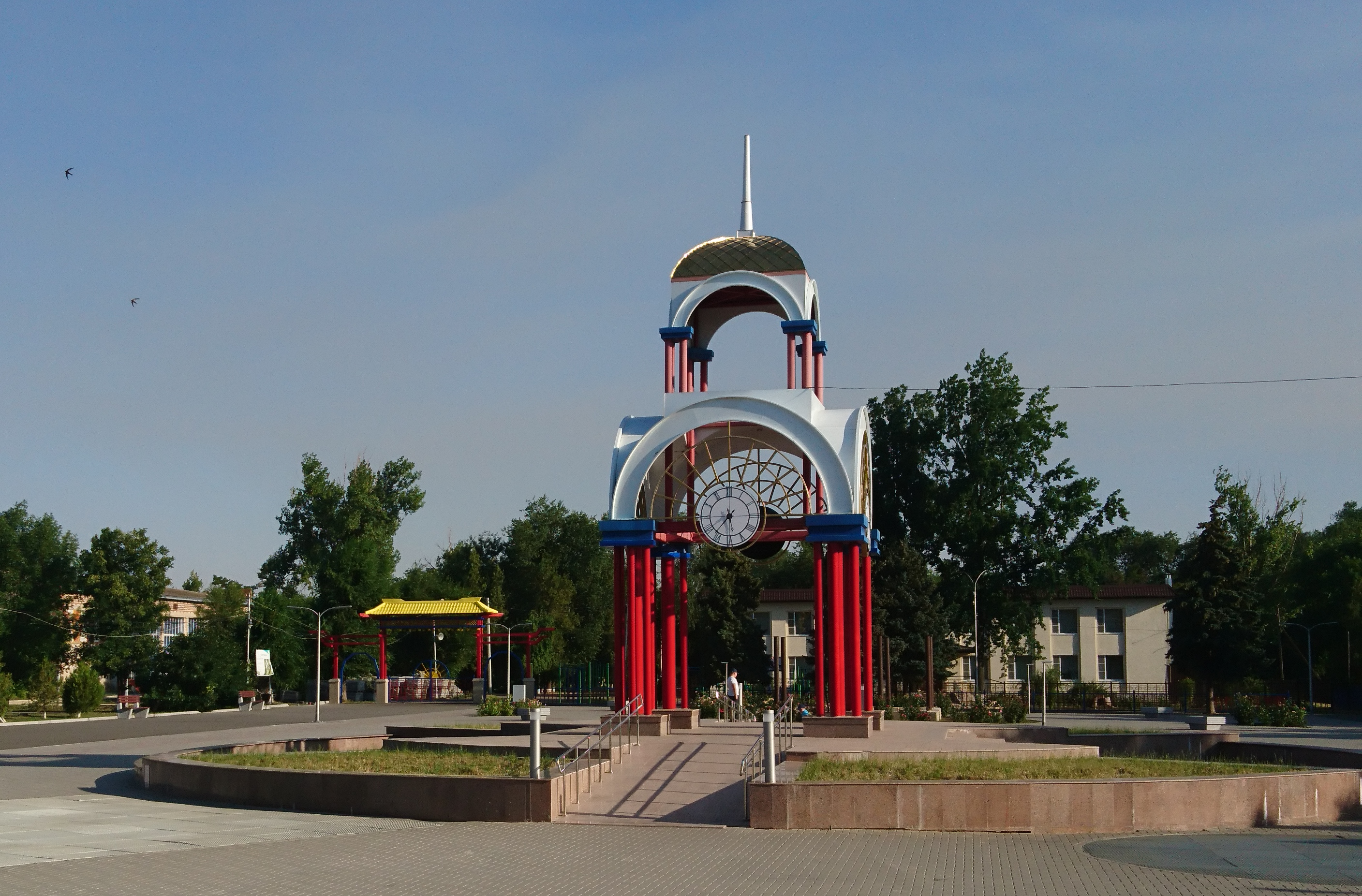
- Buddhist structures in front of the administration

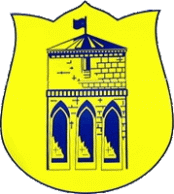
- Coat of arms
- Interactive map of Gorodovikovsk
- Location of Gorodovikovsk Gorodovikovsk (Kalmykia)
- Coordinates: 46°05′N 41°56′E
- Country: Russia
- Federal subject: Kalmykia
- Administrative district: Gorodovikovsky District
- TownSelsoviet: Gorodovikovsk
- Founded: 1871
- Town status since: 1971

Area
  - Total: 15.6 km^{2} (6.0 sq mi)
- Elevation: 60 m (200 ft)

Population (2010 Census)
  - Total: 9,565
  - Estimate (2025): 8,161 (−14.7%)
  - Density: 613/km^{2} (1,590/sq mi)

Administrative status
  - Capital of: Gorodovikovsky District, Town of Gorodovikovsk

Municipal status
  - Municipal district: Gorodovikovsky Municipal District
  - Urban settlement: Gorodovikovskoye Urban Settlement
  - Capital of: Gorodovikovsky Municipal District, Gorodovikovskoye Urban Settlement
- Time zone: UTC+3 (MSK)
- Postal code: 359050–359053
- OKTMO ID: 85605101001
- Website: admgorodovikovsk.ru

Gorodovikovsk (Russian: Городовико́вск; Kalmyk: Бәәшңтә, Bääşñtä) is a town and the administrative center of Gorodovikovsky District of the Republic of Kalmykia, Russia, located on the Bashanta River, 240 kilometers (150 mi) west of Elista. Population: 9,565 (2010 census); 10,940 (2002 census); 11,902 (1989 Soviet census). It was previously known as Bashanta (until 1971).

== History ==
It was founded in 1871 as a Kalmyk settlement of Bashanta (Башанта, a Russified version of its Kalmyk name). It was granted urban-type settlement status in 1938. In 1971, it was granted town status and renamed Gorodovikovsk after the Hero of the Soviet Union Oka Gorodovikov, who was of Kalmyk origin.

== Administrative and municipal status ==
Within the framework of administrative divisions, Gorodovikovsk serves as the administrative center of Gorodovikovsky District. As an administrative division, it is incorporated within Gorodovikovsky District as the Town of Gorodovikovsk. As a municipal division, the Town of Gorodovikovsk is incorporated within Gorodovikovsky Municipal District as Gorodovikovskoye Urban Settlement.

== Tourist attractions ==
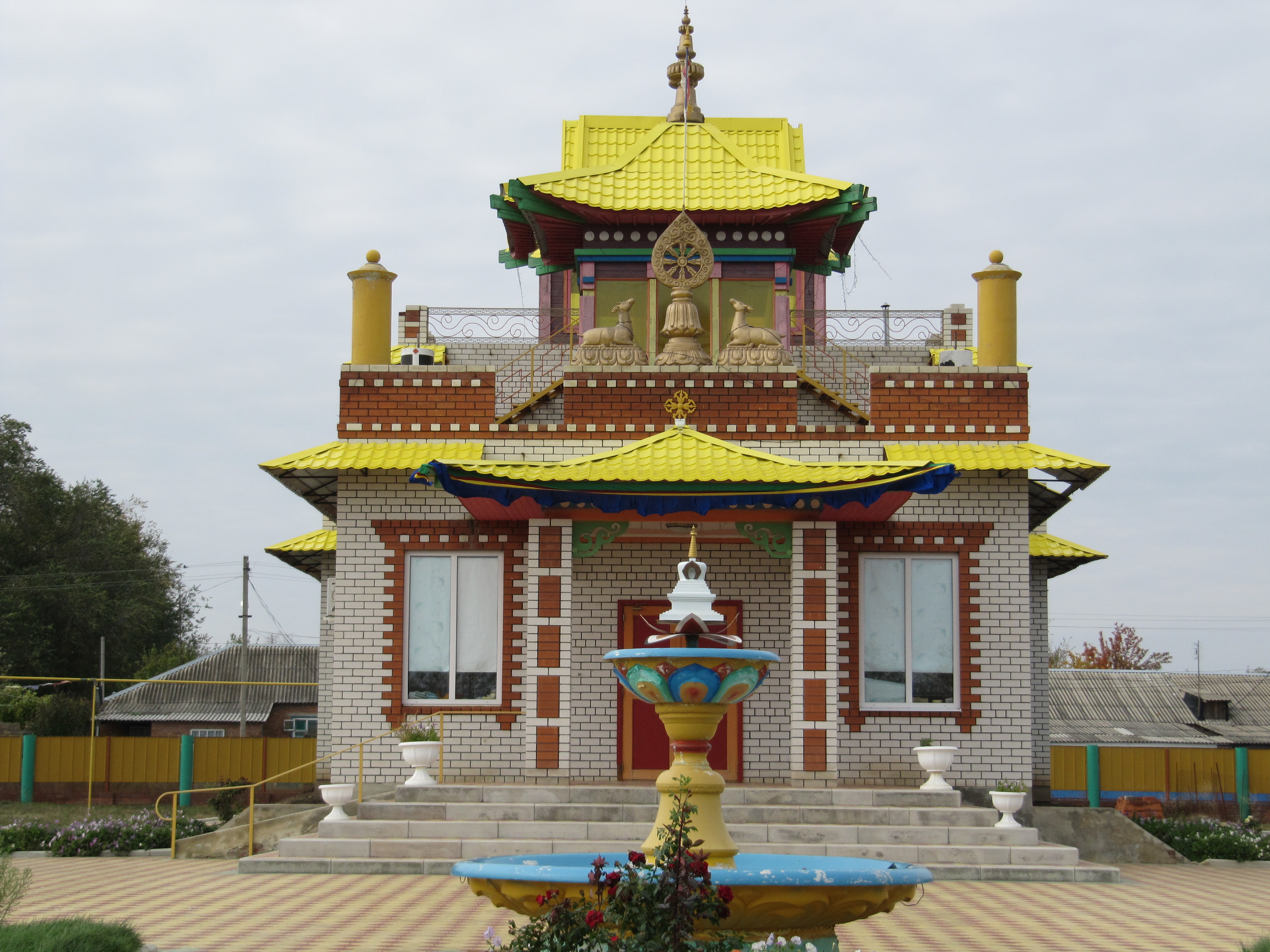
Tantric monastery in Gorodovikovsk

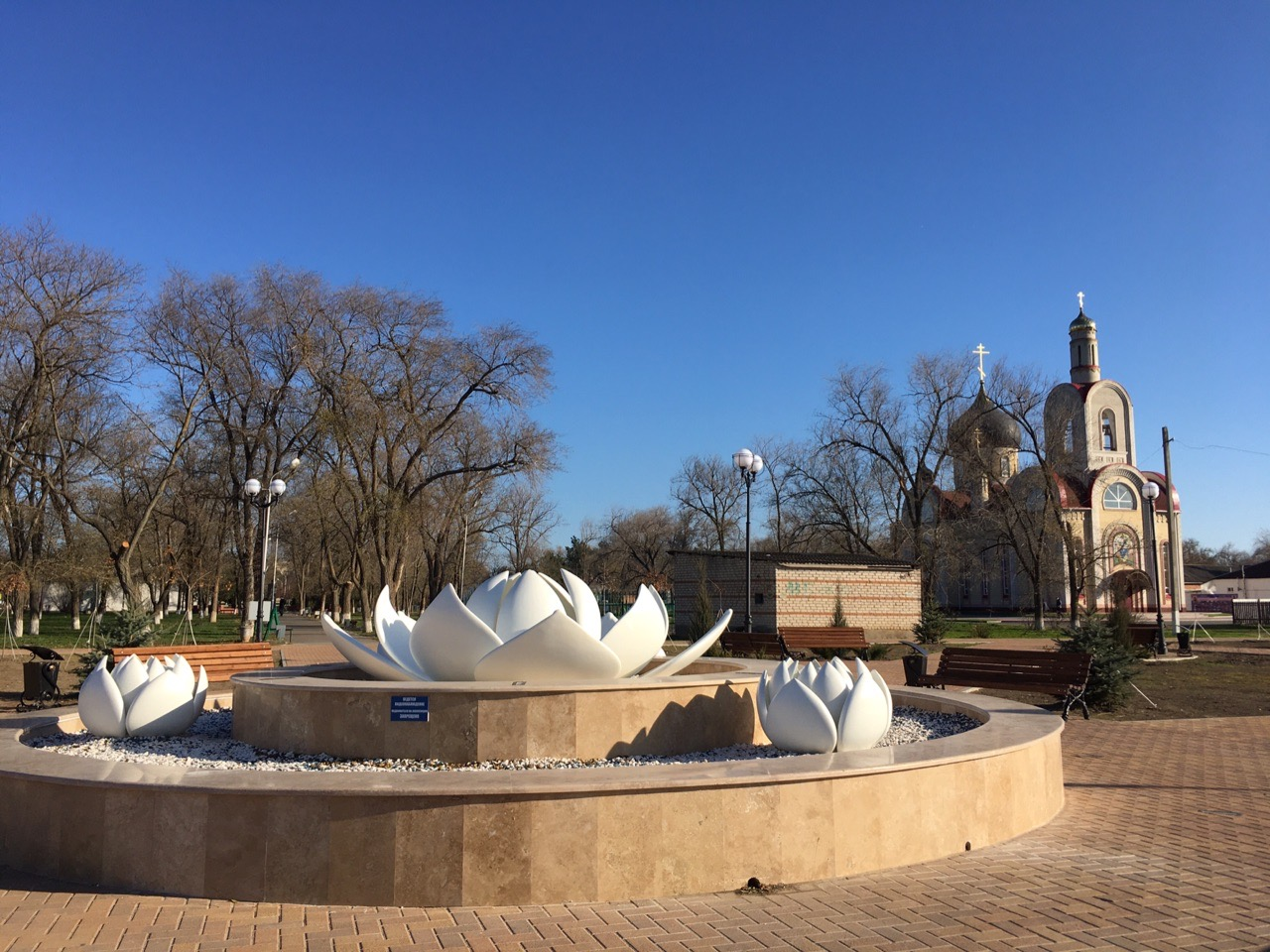
Lotus Lawn and Church of the Holy Tsarevich Alexy

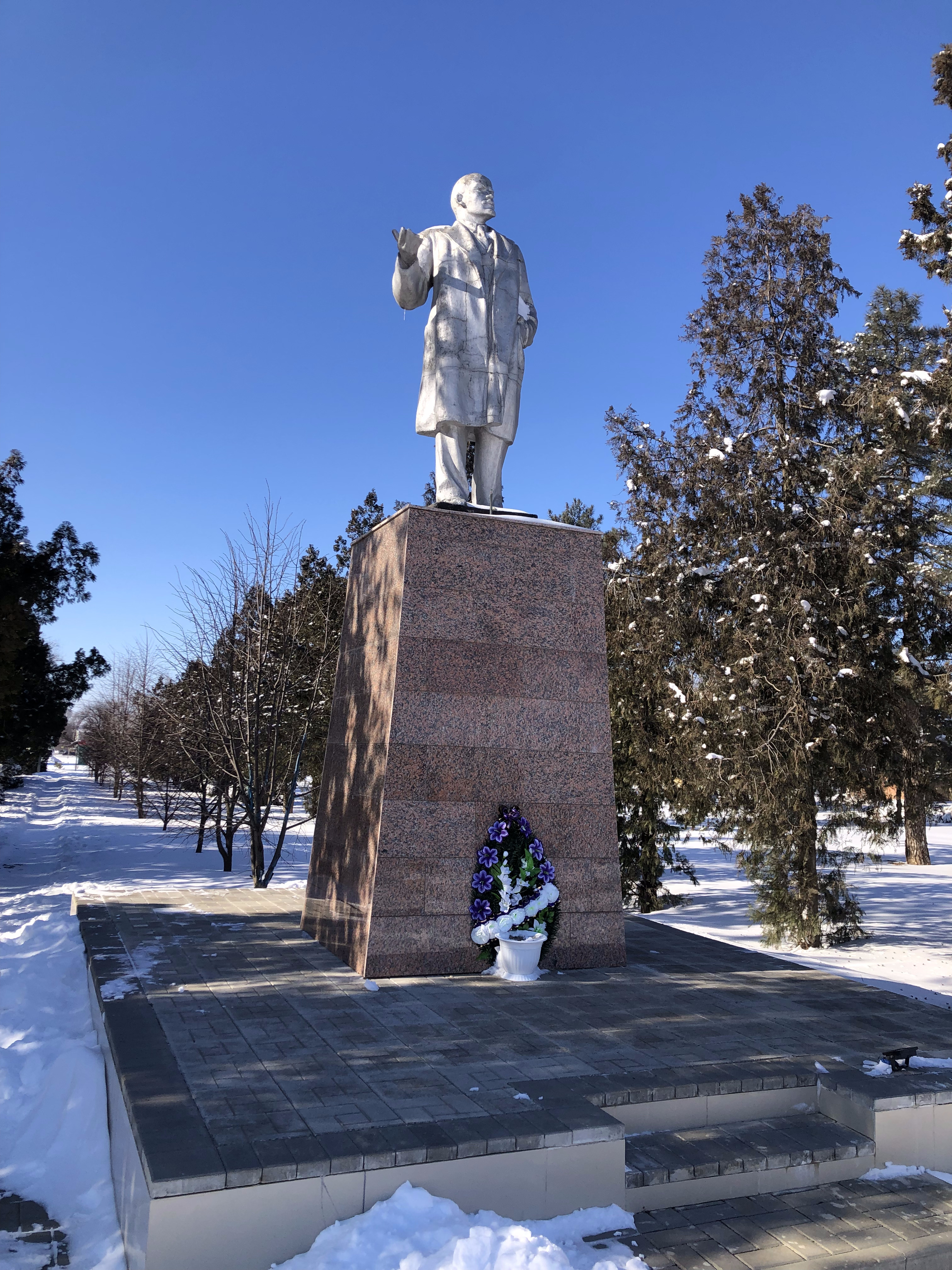
Statue of Lenin

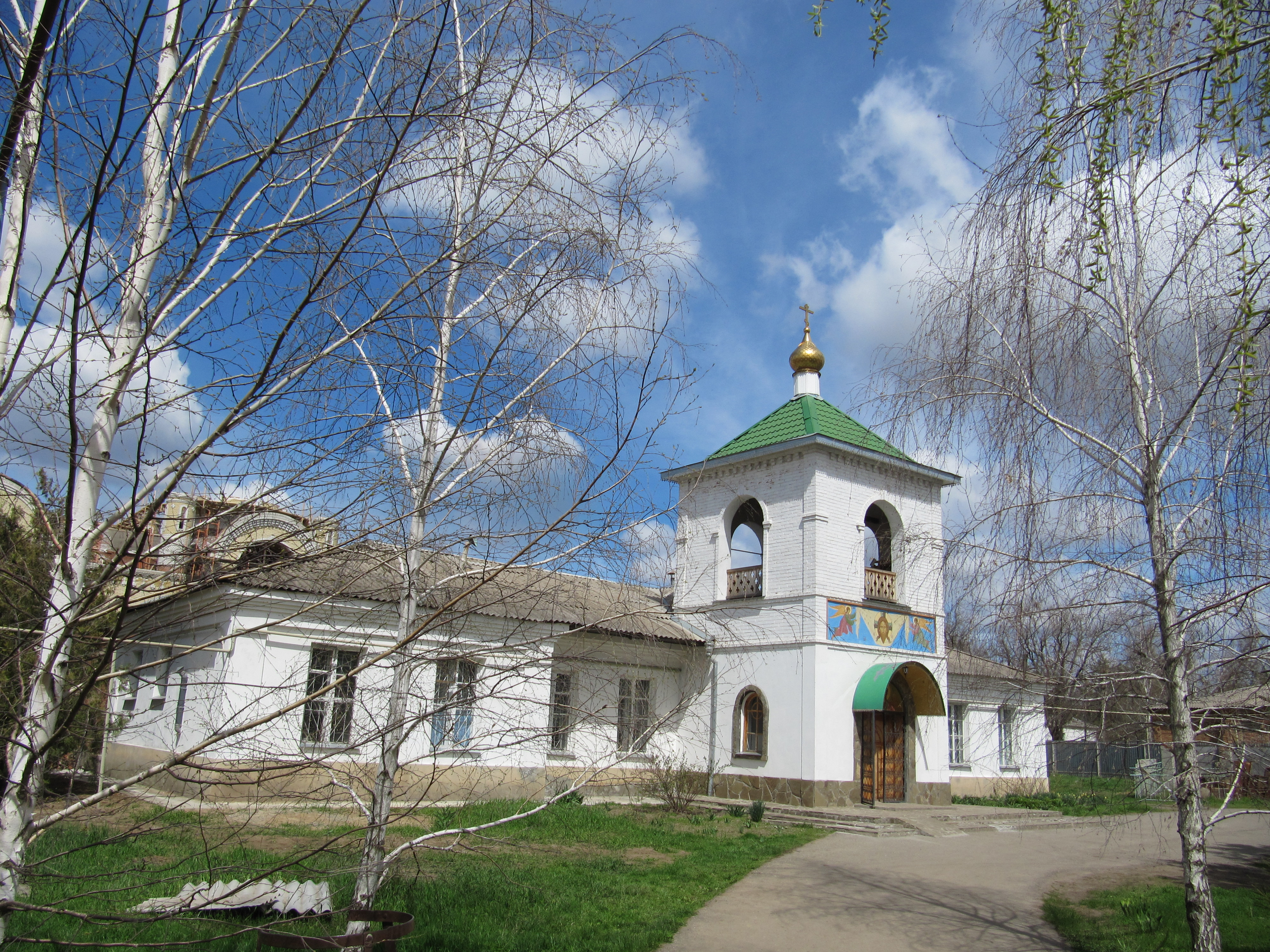
Church of Archangel Michael

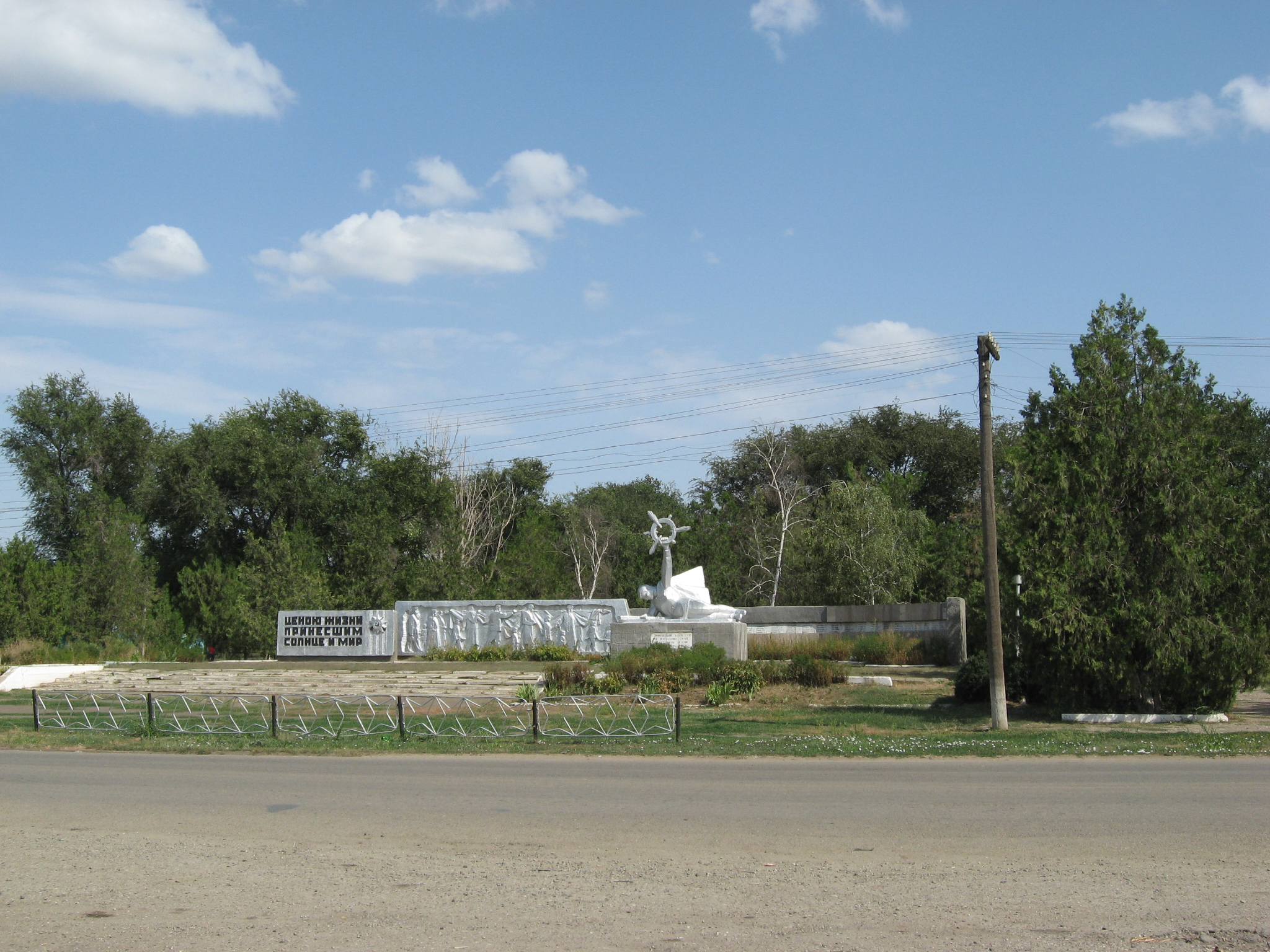
Memorial to soldiers who died during the Great Patriotic War
