= Gorodovikovsky District =

Gorodovikovsky District Городовиковский район (Russian)
- District

Other transcription(s)
  - Kalmyk: Башнтан район
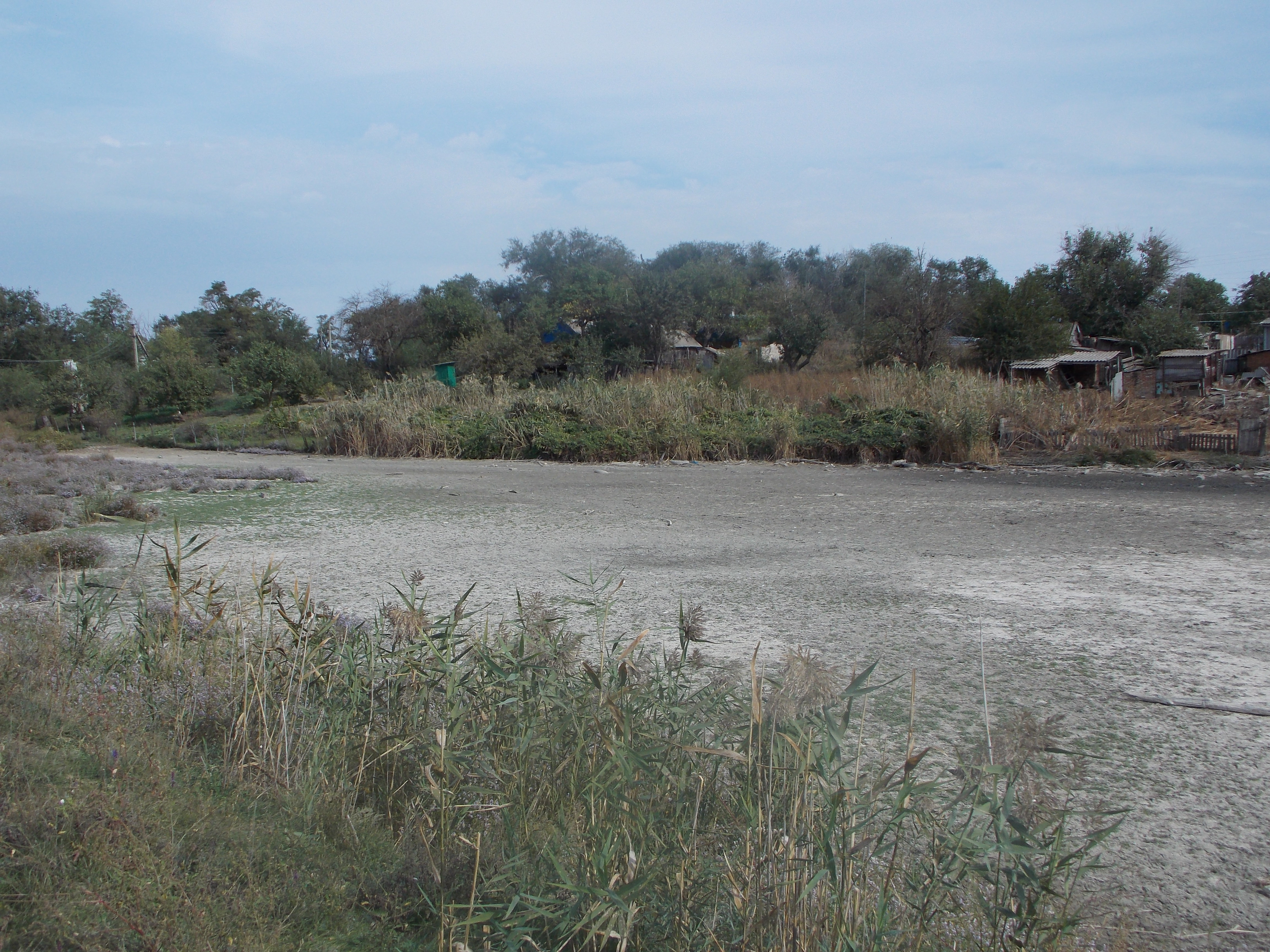
- The Khagin-Sala River near the selo of Vesyoloye in Gorodovikovsky District

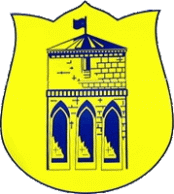
- Coat of arms
- Location of Gorodovikovsky District in the Republic of Kalmykia
- Coordinates: 46°05′N 41°56′E
- Country: Russia
- Federal subject: Republic of Kalmykia
- Established: 1920
- Administrative center: Gorodovikovsk

Area
  - Total: 1,099.05 km^{2} (424.35 sq mi)

Population (2010 Census)
  - Total: 17,295
  - Density: 15.736/km^{2} (40.757/sq mi)
  - Urban: 55.3%
  - Rural: 44.7%

Administrative structure
  - Administrative divisions: 1 Towns, 6 Rural administrations
  - Inhabited localities: 1 cities/towns, 18 rural localities

Municipal structure
  - Municipally incorporated as: Gorodovikovsky Municipal District
  - Municipal divisions: 1 urban settlements, 6 rural settlements
- Time zone: UTC+3 (MSK)
- OKTMO ID: 85605000
- Website: http://agrmo.rk08.ru

Population of Gorodovikovsky District
- 2010 Census: 17,295
- 2002 Census: 19,322
- 1989 Census: 20,895
- 1979 Census: 20,922

Gorodovikovsky District (Russian: Городовико́вский райо́н; Kalmyk: Башнтан район, Başntan rayon) is an administrative and municipal district (raion), one of the thirteen in the Republic of Kalmykia, Russia. It is located in the west of the republic. The area of the district is 1,099.05 square kilometers (424.35 sq mi). Its administrative center is the town of Gorodovikovsk. As of the 2010 Census, the total population of the district was 17,295, with the population of Gorodovikovsk accounting for 55.3% of that number.

== History ==
The district was established in 1920. Until April 1960, the district was known as Zapadny District (Западный район, i.e., Western District).

== Administrative and municipal status ==
Within the framework of administrative divisions, Gorodovikovsky District is one of the thirteen in the Republic of Kalmykia. It is divided into one town (an administrative division with the administrative center in the town (an inhabited locality) of Gorodovikovsk) and six rural administrations, which comprise eighteen rural localities. As a municipal division, the district is incorporated as Gorodovikovsky Municipal District. The Town of Gorodovikovsk is incorporated as an urban settlement, and the six rural administration are incorporated as six rural settlements within the municipal district. The town of Gorodovikovsk serves as the administrative center of both the administrative and municipal district.
