= Lagansky District =

Lagansky District Лаганский район (Russian)
- District

Other transcription(s)
  - Kalmyk: Лаганя район
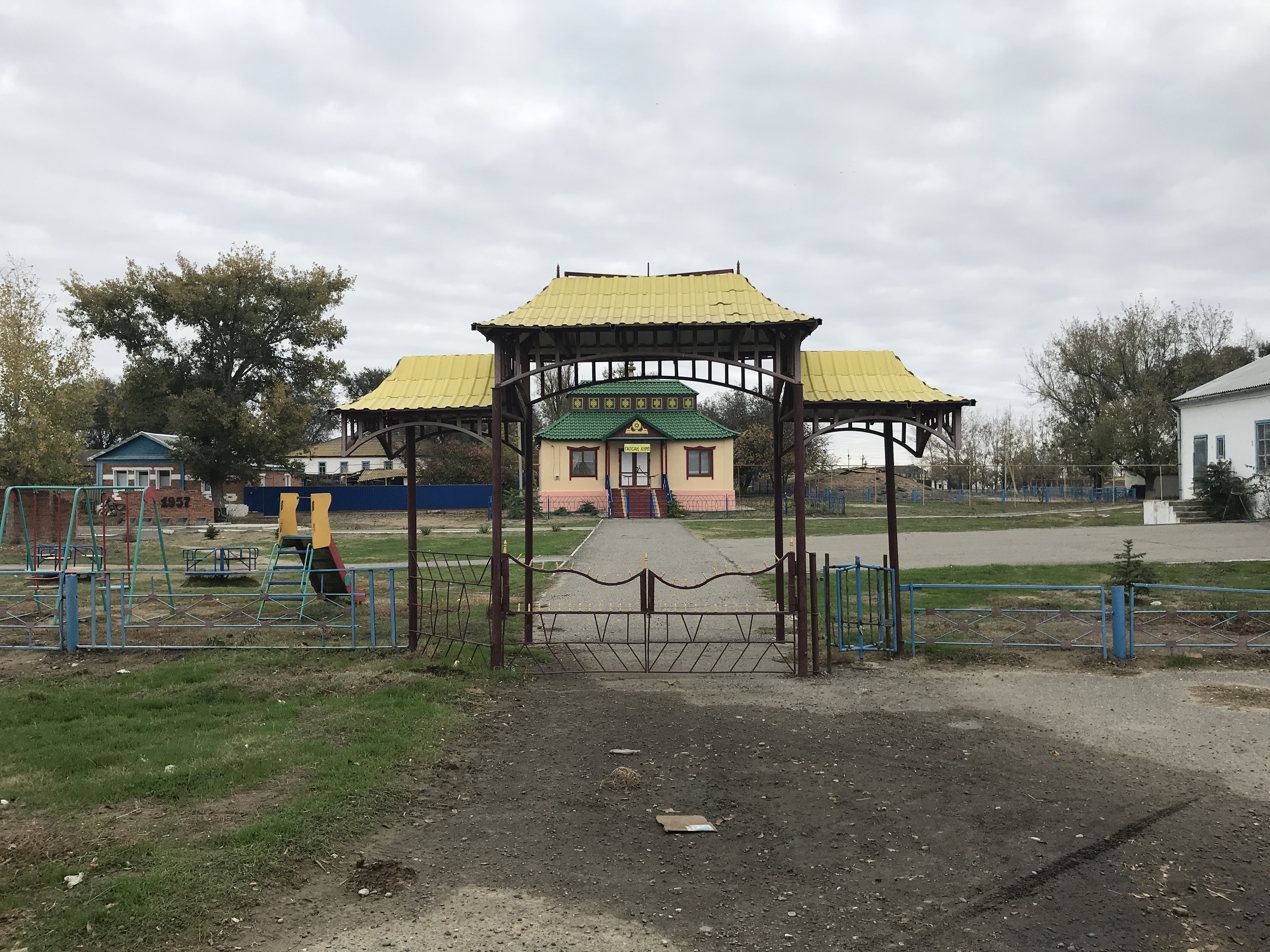
- Buddhist temple in Djalykovo, Lagansky District

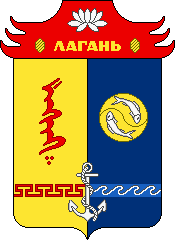
- Coat of arms
- Location of Lagansky District in the Republic of Kalmykia
- Coordinates: 45°23′N 47°22′E
- Country: Russia
- Federal subject: Republic of Kalmykia
- Established: 1935
- Administrative center: Lagan

Area
  - Total: 4,685.51 km^{2} (1,809.09 sq mi)

Population (2010 Census)
  - Total: 20,089
  - Density: 4.2875/km^{2} (11.105/sq mi)
  - Urban: 71.3%
  - Rural: 28.7%

Administrative structure
  - Administrative divisions: 1 Towns, 3 Rural administrations
  - Inhabited localities: 1 cities/towns, 5 rural localities

Municipal structure
  - Municipally incorporated as: Lagansky Municipal District
  - Municipal divisions: 1 urban settlements, 4 rural settlements
- Time zone: UTC+3 (MSK)
- OKTMO ID: 85615000
- Website: http://www.85215.ru/

Population of Lagansky District
- 2010 Census: 20,089
- 2002 Census: 20,007
- 1989 Census: 23,651
- 1979 Census: 22,193

Lagansky District (Russian: Лага́нский райо́н; Kalmyk: Лаганя район, Laganya rayon) is an administrative and municipal district (raion), one of the thirteen in the Republic of Kalmykia, Russia. It is located in the southeast of the republic. The area of the district is 4,685.51 square kilometers (1,809.09 sq mi). Its administrative center is the town of Lagan. As of the 2010 Census, the total population of the district was 20,089, with the population of Lagan accounting for 71.3% of that number.

== History ==
The district was established in 1935. Until 1995, it was called Kaspiysky (Russian: Каспи́йский райо́н, lit. "Caspian"; Kalmyk: Каспийск район, Kaspijsk rajon).

== Administrative and municipal status ==
Within the framework of administrative divisions, Lagansky District is one of the thirteen in the Republic of Kalmykia. It is divided into one town (an administrative division with the administrative center in the town (an inhabited locality) of Lagan) and three rural administrations, which comprise five rural localities. As a municipal division, the district is incorporated as Lagansky Municipal District. The Town of Lagan is incorporated as an urban settlement, and the three rural administration are incorporated as four rural settlements within the municipal district. The town of Lagan serves as the administrative center of both the administrative and municipal district.
