= Yergeni =

Hills in Russia

- Ергени / Ergnin җirn zurһan shiir
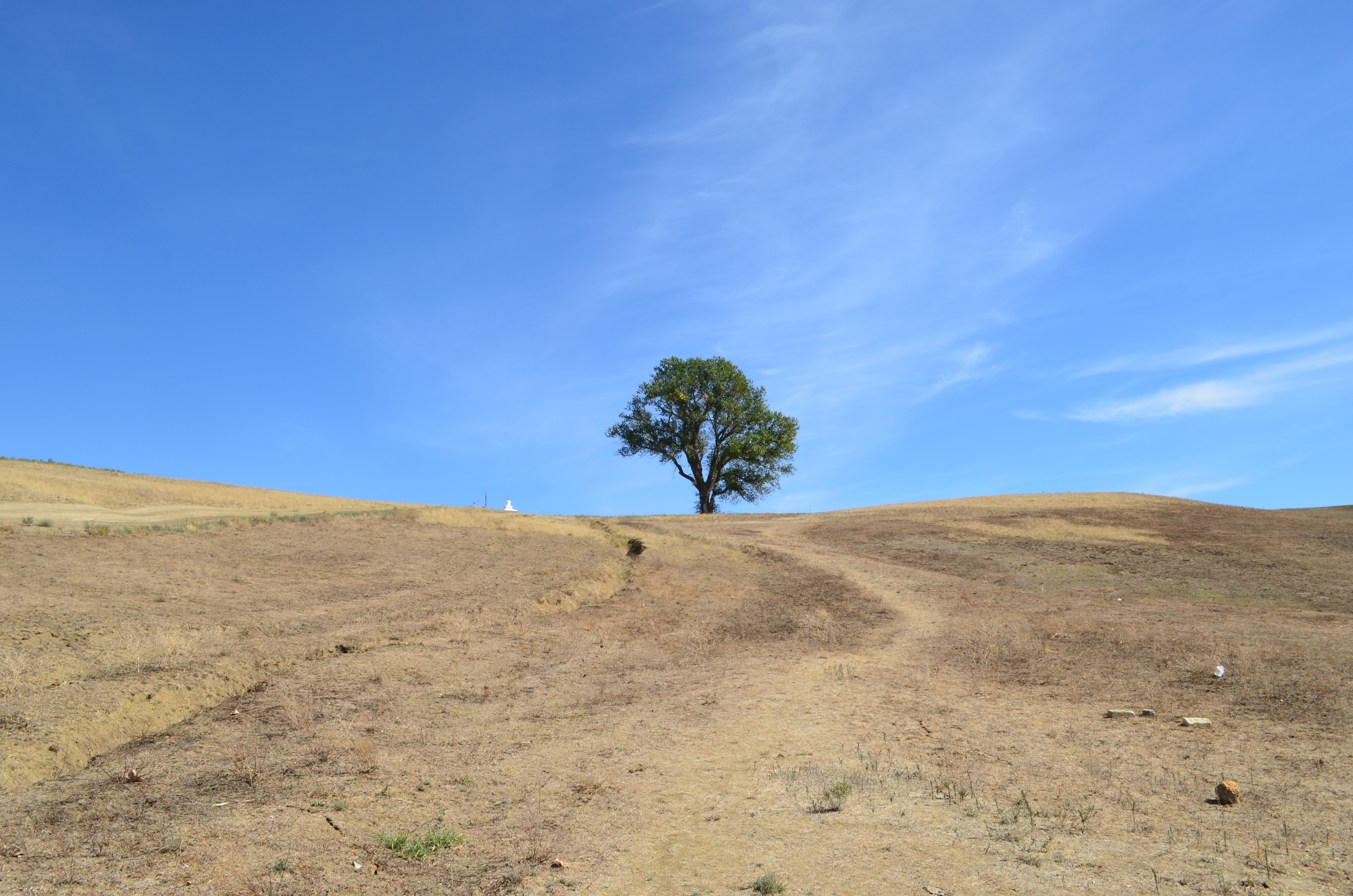
- Landscape of the hills

Highest point
- Peak: Shared
- Elevation: 222 m (728 ft)
- Coordinates: 46°19′N 44°16′E

Dimensions
- Length: 350 km (220 mi) N/S
- Width: 50 km (31 mi) E/W

Geography
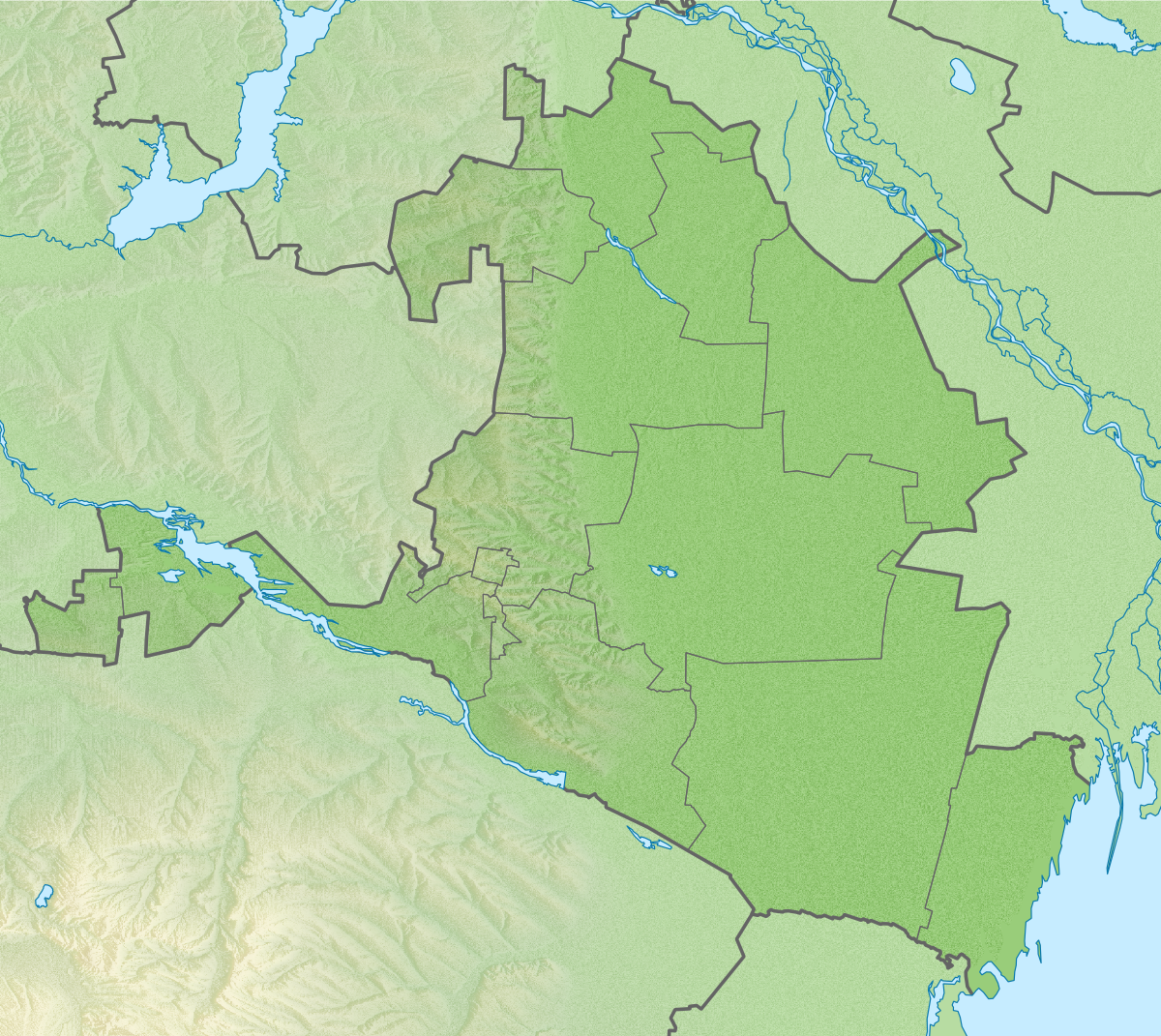
- Location within Kalmykia Location within European Russia Location within Russia Location within Europe
- Location: East European Plain (Kalmykia, Volgograd Oblast, Rostov Oblast, Russia)

Geology
- Rock type(s): Sand, clay, limestone and sandstone

Climbing
- Easiest route: From Elista

Yergeni (Ергени; Oirat: Ergnin җirn zurһan shiir) is a hilly area in Russia. It is located in the southern corner of the East European Plain, mostly in Kalmykia, with parts in Volgograd Oblast and Rostov Oblast. The highest point of Kalmykia, 222 metres (728 ft) high Shared, is located in the Yergeni hills.

In Kalmykia the hills stretch from Sarpinsky District to the north to Iki-Burulsky District in the south.

== History ==
A thorough topographic survey of the Yergeni was carried out in 1860–61 by Russian topographer Ivan Krizhin, who drew the first maps of the area.

The Volga–Don Canal was built across the northern part of the hill area in 1952.

== Geography ==
The Yergeni area forms the watershed between the Azov and the Caspian seas. The hills lie to the west of the lower course of the Volga, between Volgograd to the north and the Manych Depression to the south. The eastern slopes rise abruptly from the Caspian Lowland dissected by numerous ravines, with up to 70 metres (230 ft) to 80 metres (260 ft) high escarpments. The western slope, on the other hand, gradually descends to the Don valley. The average elevation of the hills is about 160 metres (520 ft).

The Sal, a left tributary of the Don, is the main river having its sources in the hills.

== Flora and fauna ==
The climate is semi-desert and the hills are mostly covered with grasses and shrubs, including feather grass, Volga fescue, wormwood and saltwort, but some trees, such as willow, oak, elm, and aspen, may grow in the ravines of the eastern slopes.

Some of the animals found in the hills are the demoiselle crane, the eastern imperial eagle, steppe eagle, red-footed falcon, white-winged lark and the javelin sand boa.

== See also ==
- Highest points of Russian Federal subjects
- List of mountains and hills of Russia
- Kalmyk Steppe
