= Lagan, Russia =

Town in the Republic of Kalmykia, Russia

Lagan Лагань
- Town

Other transcription(s)
  - Kalmyk: Лагань
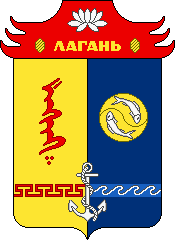
- Coat of arms
- Interactive map of Lagan
- Location of Lagan Lagan (Kalmykia)
- Coordinates: 45°23′27″N 47°21′57″E
- Country: Russia
- Federal subject: Kalmykia
- Administrative district: Lagansky District
- TownSelsoviet: Lagan
- Founded: 1870
- Town status since: 1963

Area
  - Total: 91.38 km^{2} (35.28 sq mi)
- Elevation: 0 m (0 ft)

Population (2010 Census)
  - Total: 14,323
  - Estimate (2025): 13,756 (−4%)
  - Density: 156.7/km^{2} (406.0/sq mi)

Administrative status
  - Capital of: Lagansky District, Town of Lagan

Municipal status
  - Municipal district: Lagansky Municipal District
  - Urban settlement: Laganskoye Urban Settlement
  - Capital of: Lagansky Municipal District, Laganskoye Urban Settlement
- Time zone: UTC+3 (MSK)
- Postal code: 359221
- OKTMO ID: 85615101001

Lagan (Russian: Лага́нь, Russian pronunciation: [lɐˈganʲ]; Kalmyk: Лагань, Lagaň, [lɑˈgɑnʲ]) is a town and the administrative center of Lagansky District in the Republic of Kalmykia, Russia, located a few kilometers from the Caspian Sea. Population: 14,323 (2010 census); 14,345 (2002 census); 15,824 (1989 Soviet census). In terms of population, it is the second biggest settlement in the republic after the capital Elista.

== History ==
Lagan was founded in 1870. Town status was granted to it in 1963. In the Soviet period, from 1944 to 1991, it was known as Kaspiysky (Каспи́йский). Lagan was occupied by the Germans during August–December 1942.

== Administrative and municipal status ==
Within the framework of administrative divisions, Lagan serves as the administrative center of Lagansky District. As an administrative division, it is incorporated within Lagansky District as the Town of Lagan. As a municipal division, the Town of Lagan is incorporated within Lagansky Municipal District as Laganskoye Urban Settlement.

== Climate ==
Highest recorded temperature:40.3 °C (104.5 °F) on 12 July 2010.
Lowest recorded temperature:−32.8 °C (−27.0 °F) on 8 February 2012.

Climate data for Lagan (Kaspiyskiy), normals and extremes for 1959-2013
Month	Jan	Feb	Mar	Apr	May	Jun	Jul	Aug	Sep	Oct	Nov	Dec	Year
Record high °C (°F)	14.8 (58.6)	19.4 (66.9)	22.3 (72.1)	30.3 (86.5)	34.5 (94.1)	37.9 (100.2)	40.3 (104.5)	38.7 (101.7)	35.4 (95.7)	29.8 (85.6)	23.4 (74.1)	15.7 (60.3)	40.3 (104.5)
Mean daily maximum °C (°F)	−0.08 (31.86)	0.53 (32.95)	6.55 (43.79)	15.99 (60.78)	23.23 (73.81)	28.57 (83.43)	31.2 (88.2)	29.74 (85.53)	23.68 (74.62)	15.73 (60.31)	7.89 (46.20)	2.28 (36.10)	15.44 (59.80)
Daily mean °C (°F)	−3.13 (26.37)	−2.79 (26.98)	2.78 (37.00)	11.3 (52.3)	17.96 (64.33)	22.83 (73.09)	25.26 (77.47)	23.85 (74.93)	18.35 (65.03)	11.28 (52.30)	4.68 (40.42)	−0.37 (31.33)	11.00 (51.80)
Mean daily minimum °C (°F)	−6.18 (20.88)	−6.11 (21.00)	−1.0 (30.2)	6.61 (43.90)	12.69 (54.84)	17.08 (62.74)	19.32 (66.78)	17.96 (64.33)	13.01 (55.42)	6.83 (44.29)	1.43 (34.57)	−3.03 (26.55)	6.55 (43.79)
Record low °C (°F)	−29.1 (−20.4)	−32.8 (−27.0)	−12.5 (9.5)	−6 (21)	−0.7 (30.7)	6.5 (43.7)	10 (50)	7.8 (46.0)	−4.4 (24.1)	−12.7 (9.1)	−23.2 (−9.8)	−24.1 (−11.4)	−32.8 (−27.0)
Average precipitation mm (inches)	13.0 (0.51)	11.8 (0.46)	16.3 (0.64)	23.4 (0.92)	25.9 (1.02)	30.0 (1.18)	20.6 (0.81)	18.4 (0.72)	17.5 (0.69)	16.2 (0.64)	16.3 (0.64)	15.3 (0.60)	224.7 (8.83)
Average precipitation days (≥ 0.01 in)	7.8	6.2	6	5.5	5.5	5	4.7	4.2	4.6	5.2	7.5	8.8	71
Source: NOAA

== Religion ==
Most of the population in Lagan are Tibetan Buddhists. There is a Tibetan Buddhist temple in the town, known as Dardeling Temple.
