= Kalmykia constituency =

Russian legislative constituency

Kalmykia single-member constituency
- Constituency of the Russian State Duma

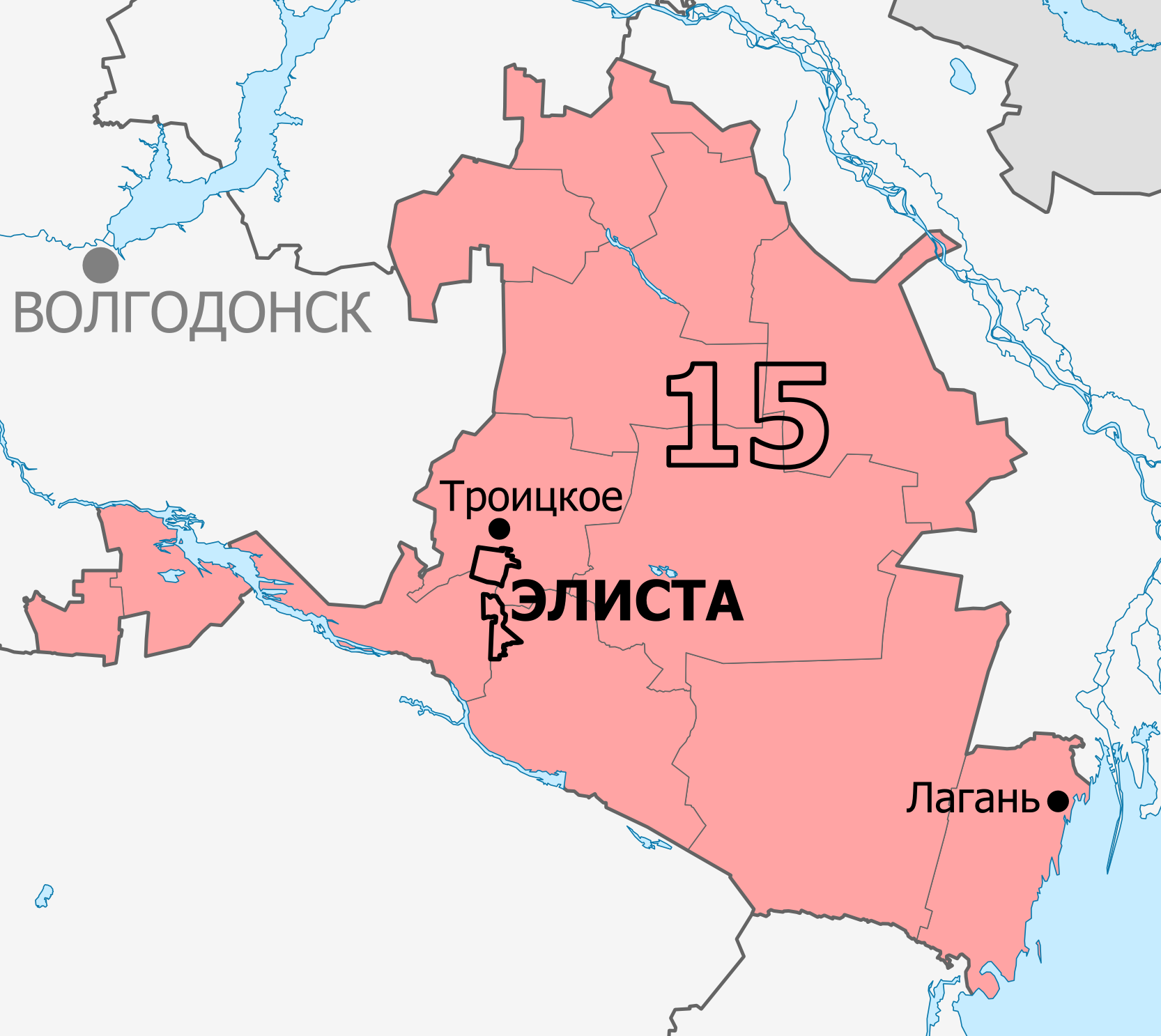
- Deputy: Mikhail Bogatov; United Russia
- Federal subject: Republic of Kalmykia
- Districts: Chernozemelsky, Elista, Gorodovikovsky, Iki-Burulsky, Ketchenerovsky, Lagansky, Maloderbetovsky, Oktyabrsky, Priyutnensky, Sarpinsky, Tselinny, Yashaltinsky, Yashkulsky, Yustinsky
- Voters: 197,674 (2026)

The Kalmykia constituency (No.18 (Note: No.14 in 1993-2003, No.15 in 2016–2026)) is a Russian legislative constituency in Kalmykia. The constituency encompasses the entire territory of Kalmykia.

The constituency has been represented since 2026 by United Russia deputy Mikhail Bogatov, former Member of People's Khural of Kalmykia and asphalt plant owner, who won the open seat after one-term United Russia incumbent Badma Bashankayev successfully sought re-election in the Jewish constituency.

== Boundaries ==
1993–2007, 2016–present: Chernozemelsky District, Elista, Gorodovikovsky District, Iki-Burulsky District, Ketchenerovsky District, Lagansky District, Maloderbetovsky District, Oktyabrsky District, Priyutnensky District, Sarpinsky District, Tselinny District, Yashaltinsky District, Yashkulsky District, Yustinsky District
The constituency has been covering the entirety of the Kalmykia since its initial creation in 1993.

== Members elected ==
Election	Member	Party
1993	Bembya Khulkhachiyev	Independent
1995	Gennady Kulik (Note: appointed Deputy Prime Minister of Russia in September 1998)	Agrarian Party
1999	Aleksandra Buratayeva	Unity
2003	Gennady Kulik	United Russia
2007	Proportional representation - no election by constituency	
2011	Proportional representation - no election by constituency	
2016	Marina Mukabenova	United Russia
2021	Badma Bashankayev	United Russia
2026	Mikhail Bogatov	United Russia

== Election results ==
=== 1993 ===
==== Declared candidates ====
- Ivan Alzheyev (Independent), Kalmyk State University faculty of history and law dean
- Valery Badmayev (Independent), sovkhoz director
- Vladimir Dordzhiyev (APR), former People's Deputy of Russia (1990–1993)
- Bembya Khulkhachiyev (Independent), Chairman of the Elista City Court (1985–present)
- Vladimir Kolesnik (Independent), history associate professor
- Gennady Mechitov (YaBL), former lecturer
- Nikolay Sandzhiyev (Independent), Minister of Culture of Kalmykia (1993–present)
- Nikolay Sekenov (Independent), Deputy Chairman of the Kalmykia State Committee on State Property Management

==== Results ====
Summary of the 12 December 1993 Russian legislative election in the Kalmykia constituency
Candidate	Party	Votes	%
Bembya Khulkhachiyev	Independent	44,389	37.61%
Ivan Alzheyev	Independent	–	–
Valery Badmayev	Independent	–	–
Vladimir Dordzhiyev	Agrarian Party	–	–
Vladimir Kolesnik	Independent	–	–
Gennady Mechitov	Yavlinsky–Boldyrev–Lukin	–	–
Nikolay Sandzhiyev	Independent	–	–
Nikolay Sekenov	Independent	–	–
Total		118,036	100%

=== 1995 ===
==== Declared candidates ====
- Raisa Donogruppova (AAR), attorney
- Nikolay Dzhaldzhireyev (KTR–zSS), middle school principal
- Aleksandr Golovatov (NDR), Member of Federation Council (1994–present), First Deputy Premier of Kalmykia – Chairman of the State Committee on State Property Management (1995–present)
- Aleksandr Karulin (KPR), consultant
- Anatoly Kazimirov (Independent), aide to State Duma member
- Klavdia Kekelyayeva (PGL), postal worker
- Vladimir Kolesnik (Independent), Kalmyk State University department of world history head, 1993 candidate for this seat
- Gennady Kulik (APR), Member of State Duma (1994–present)
- Gennady Namsinov (People's Union), Presidential Administration of Kalmykia official
- Lev Pyurbeyev (VTS), chairman of the Party of the Political Repression Victims
- Olga Sivochalova (KRO), reproductive health scientist
- Yelena Ubushayeva (Yabloko), aide to State Duma member

==== Declined ====
- Bembya Khulkhachiyev (Independent), incumbent Member of State Duma (1994–present), 1995 presidential candidate

==== Results ====
Summary of the 17 December 1995 Russian legislative election in the Kalmykia constituency
Candidate	Party	Votes	%
Gennady Kulik	Agrarian Party	63,837	47.68%
Aleksandr Golovatov	Our Home – Russia	22,278	16.64%
Vladimir Kolesnik	Independent	12,366	9.24%
Nikolay Dzhaldzhireyev	Communists and Working Russia - for the Soviet Union	9,877	7.38%
Anatoly Kazimirov	Independent	7,301	5.45%
Yelena Ubushayeva	Yabloko	3,939	2.94%
Raisa Donogruppova	Russian Lawyers' Association	2,591	1.94%
Olga Sivochalova	Congress of Russian Communities	1,175	0.88%
Klavdia Kekelyayeva	Pamfilova–Gurov–Lysenko	972	0.73%
Gennady Namsinov	People's Union	822	0.61%
Lev Pyurbeyev	Faith, Work, Conscience	678	0.51%
Aleksandr Karulin	Conservative Party	412	0.31%
against all		5,239	3.91%
Total		133,891	100%

=== 1999 ===
==== Declared candidates ====
- Yury Badmayev (Independent), factory trustee
- Yelena Baturina (Independent), construction businesswoman, wife of Moscow mayor Yury Luzhkov
- Aleksandra Buratayeva (Unity), ORT news anchor
- Dmitry Burninov (Independent), Aeroflot representative in Munich
- Radiy Burulov (NDR), First Deputy Mayor of Elista (1997–present)
- Vitaly Daginov (OVR), businessman
- Vladimir Kolesnik (Yabloko), history associate professor, 1993 and 1995 candidate for this seat
- Aleksey Kucherenko (Independent), Presidential Agency for Development and Cooperation director

==== Failed to qualify ====
- Nikolay Dzhaldzhireyev (K–TR–zSS), middle school principal, 1995 candidate for this seat
- Andrey Mgar (Independent)
- Yuly Oglayev (Independent), history associate professor
- Basan Zakharov (Nikolayev–Fyodorov Bloc), journalist, community activist

==== Did not file ====
- Aleksey Garyayev (Independent)
- Igor Geyko (LDPR)
- Yelena Gorodovikova (Independent)
- Mergen Stepkin (Independent)

==== Declined ====
- Gennady Kulik (OVR), former Deputy Prime Minister of Russia (1998–1999), former Member of State Duma (1994–1998) (ran on the party list)

==== Results ====
Summary of the 19 December 1999 Russian legislative election in the Kalmykia constituency
Candidate	Party	Votes	%
Aleksandra Buratayeva	Unity	30,482	24.13%
Vladimir Kolesnik	Yabloko	21,827	17.28%
Aleksey Kucherenko	Independent	15,476	12.25%
Yelena Baturina	Independent	15,210	12.04%
Radiy Burulov	Our Home – Russia	10,621	8.41%
Vitaly Daginov	Fatherland – All Russia	8,779	6.95%
Yury Badmayev	Independent	5,950	4.71%
Dmitry Burninov	Independent	5,733	4.54%
against all		8,906	7.05%
Total		126,339	100%

=== 2003 ===
==== Declared candidates ====
- Nikolay Daykhes (CPRF), Member of State Duma (2000–present)
- Yury Erdneyev (Independent), agriculture executive
- Vladimir Karuyev (Independent), folk singer, storyteller
- Vladimir Kolesnik (Yabloko), history associate professor, 1993, 1995 and 1999 candidate for this seat
- Gennady Kulik (United Russia), Member of State Duma (1994–1998, 2000–present), Chairman of the Duma Committee on Agriculture (2002–present)
- Lidia Lebedeva (RPP-PSS), former Minister of Social Protection of Kalmykia (1988–1993)
- Konstantin Maksimov (Independent), Member of People's Khural of Kalmykia (1993–present), former Chairman of the People's Khural (1993–1999)
- Valery Ochirov (Independent), former People's Deputy of the Soviet Union (1989–1991), retired Soviet Air Force lieutenant general, Hero of the Soviet Union (1985), 1993 presidential candidate
- Igor Pyshkin (Independent), banker
- Yury Sengleyev (Independent), Government of Russia staffer
- Vladimir Veremennikov (ORP Rus'), construction engineer

==== Withdrawn candidates ====
- David Kugultinov (PVR-RPZh), former People's Deputy of the Soviet Union (1989–1991), poet

==== Declined ====
- Aleksandra Buratayeva (United Russia), incumbent Member of State Duma (2000–present) (ran on the party list)

==== Results ====
Summary of the 7 December 2003 Russian legislative election in the Kalmykia constituency
Candidate	Party	Votes	%
Gennady Kulik	United Russia	52,617	41.10%
Valery Ochirov	Independent	40,257	31.44%
Nikolay Daykhes	Communist Party	8,146	6.36%
Yury Sengleyev	Independent	7,021	5.48%
Vladimir Kolesnik	Yabloko	3,442	2.69%
Igor Pyshkin	Independent	1,963	1.53%
Yury Erdneyev	Independent	1,709	1.33%
Vladimir Karuyev	Independent	1,319	1.03%
Lidia Lebedeva	Russian Pensioners' Party-Party of Social Justice	987	0.77%
Konstantin Maksimov	Independent	907	0.71%
Vladimir Veremennikov	United Russian Party Rus'	413	0.32%
against all		4,398	3.44%
Total		128,089	100%

=== 2016 ===
==== Declared candidates ====
- Semyon Ateyev (Yabloko), human rights activist
- Lyudmila Balakleyets (CPRF), Member of People's Khural of Kalmykia (2003–present)
- Andrey Bessarabov (LDPR), Member of Priyutnoye Assembly of Deputies (2010–present), cossack ataman
- Igor Boldyrev (Rodina), chairman of the party regional office
- Sergey Gabunshchin (The Greens), chairman of the party regional office
- Vladimir Karuyev (Patriots of Russia), folk singer, storyteller, 2003 candidate for this seat
- Sergey Manteyev (Party of Growth), former Member of Elista City Assembly (2009–2014), businessman
- Natalya Manzhikova (A Just Russia), former Member of Elista City Assembly (2001–2005, 2009–2014)
- Marina Mukabenova (United Russia), Member of State Duma (2007–present)
- Anatoly Zakharchenko (CPCR), perennial candidate

==== Failed to qualify ====
- Anatoly Arashayev (Independent), pensioner
- Dordzhi Badmayev (PVS), former Deputy Premier of Kalmykia – Minister of Agriculture (2009–2010)
- Anastasia Kravtsova (Independent), criminal law associate professor
- Vladimir Sarangov (Independent), Mayor (Akhlachi) of Ovata (2013–present)

==== Did not file ====
- Natalya Chuzhayeva (Independent), sales representative
- Kiru Ochirov (Independent), Mayor (Akhlachi) of Troitskoye (2015–present)

==== Declined ====
- Bator Aduchiyev (United Russia), Member of People's Khural of Kalmykia (2003–present), farmer (lost the primary, ran on the party list)
- Zoya Sandzhiyeva (United Russia), businesswoman, community activist (lost the primary)

==== Results ====
Summary of the 18 September 2016 Russian legislative election in the Kalmykia constituency
Candidate	Party	Votes	%
Marina Mukabenova	United Russia	77,641	63.97%
Lyudmila Balakleyets	Communist Party	11,565	9.53%
Vladimir Karuyev	Patriots of Russia	7,799	6.43%
Natalya Manzhikova	A Just Russia	6,553	5.40%
Semyon Ateyev	Yabloko	4,841	3.99%
Andrey Bessarabov	Liberal Democratic Party	4,312	3.55%
Anatoly Zakharchenko	Communists of Russia	2,320	1.91%
Igor Boldyrev	Rodina	1,476	1.22%
Sergey Manteyev	Party of Growth	1,358	1.12%
Sergey Gabunshchin	The Greens	1,054	0.87%
Total		121,373	100%

=== 2021 ===
==== Declared candidates ====
- Vladimir Bambayev (RPSS), Member of Elista City Assembly (2019–present)
- Badma Bashankayev (United Russia), coloproctologist, surgeon
- Sanal Bovayev (RPPSS), chairman of the party regional office
- Andrey Chidzhiyev (New People), investment banker
- Yelena Kotenova (Yabloko), pensioner, 1995 candidate for this seat
- Natalya Manzhikova (SR–ZP), Member of People's Khural of Kalmykia (2018–present), 2016 candidate for this seat, 2019 head candidate
- Khongor Marilov (GP), television executive, 2014 The Greens head candidate
- Tseren Ochir-Goryayev (Rodina), construction businessman
- Sanal Ubushiyev (CPRF), blogger, community activist
- Pyotr Vyshkvarok (LDPR), Member of Elista City Assembly (2019–present), aide to State Duma member Dmitry Svishchev, 2014 and 2019 head candidate

==== Failed to qualify ====
- Valery Badmayev (Independent), human rights activist, journalist, 1993 candidate for this seat
- Dmitry Burninov (Independent), pensioner, 1999 candidate for this seat
- Valentina Erdniyeva (Independent), businesswoman

==== Did not file ====
- Anatoly Lidzhiyev (Independent), former Member of People's Khural of Kalmykia (1994–2003), businessman

==== Declined ====
- Marina Mukabenova (United Russia), incumbent Member of State Duma (2007–present) (lost the primary)

==== Results ====
Summary of the 17-19 September 2021 Russian legislative election in the Kalmykia constituency
Candidate	Party	Votes	%
Badma Bashankayev	United Russia	39,717	40.55%
Sanal Ubushiyev	Communist Party	21,835	22.29%
Andrey Chidzhiyev	New People	8,080	8.25%
Natalya Manzhikova	A Just Russia — For Truth	6,740	6.88%
Sanal Bovayev	Party of Pensioners	4,762	4.86%
Vladimir Bambayev	Russian Party of Freedom and Justice	4,035	4.12%
Pyotr Vyshkvarok	Liberal Democratic Party	3,335	3.40%
Khongor Marilov	Civic Platform	2,028	2.07%
Yelena Kotenova	Yabloko	1,953	1.99%
Tseren Ochir-Goryayev	Rodina	1,053	1.08%
Total		97,951	100%

=== 2026 ===
==== Declared candidates ====
- Migmir Bembeyeva (CPRF), former Member of People's Khural of Kalmykia (2018–2023)
- Mikhail Bogatov (United Russia), Member of People's Khural of Kalmykia (2023–present), businessman
- Vadim Frantsuzov (New People), Director of the Kalmykia Centre for Information Technology and Integrated Security (2022–present)
- Badma Soyatiyev (LDPR), Member of Elista City Assembly (2024–present), construction businessman
- Aleksandr Toporkov (The Greens), individual entrepreneur
- Galina Vaskina (RPPSS), former Deputy Mayor of Elista (2010–2021), former acting Mayor of Elista (2019)
- Natalya Zinchenko (A Just Russia), businesswoman

==== Did not file ====
- Anton Sandzhiyev (Independent), "Defenders of the Fatherland" state fund social coordinator

==== Declined ====
- Aleksandr Azdorov (United Russia), Member of People's Khural of Kalmykia (2023–present), farmer (lost the primary)
- Badma Bashankayev (United Russia), incumbent Member of State Duma (2021–present) (running in the Jewish constituency)
- Yevgeny Bembeyev (United Russia), Minister of Culture and Tourism of Kalmykia (2026–present) (lost the primary)
- Tatyana Matsakova (United Russia), Member of People's Khural of Kalmykia (2023–present), social services centre director (lost the primary)
- Naran Ochir-Goryayev (United Russia), Russian Army senior lieutenant, Hero of Russia (2025) (killed in action on June 5, 2026)

==== Results ====
Summary of the 18-20 September 2026 Russian legislative election in the Kalmykia constituency
Candidate	Party	Votes	%
Mikhail Bogatov	United Russia	58,913	57.72%
Migmir Bembeyeva	Communist Party	16,530	16.19%
Vadim Frantsuzov	New People	7,695	7.54%
Badma Soyatiyev	Liberal Democratic Party	6,875	6.74%
Natalya Zinchenko	A Just Russia	6,613	6.48%
Galina Vaskina	Party of Pensioners	3,618	3.54%
Aleksandr Toporkov	The Greens	609	0.60%
Total		102,073	100%
