= Badma Bashankayev =

Russian surgeon and politician

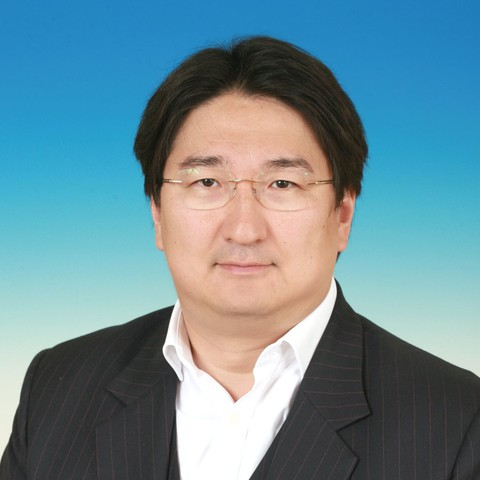
- official portrait, circa 2021

Deputy of the State Duma
- Incumbent
- Assumed office 12 October 2021
- Preceded by: Marina Mukabenova
- Constituency: Jewish (No. 220) (2026–present); Kalmykia-at-large (No. 15) (2021–2026)

Chairman of the State Duma Healthcare Committee
- In office 13 June 2023 – 26 November 2024
- Preceded by: Dmitry Khubezov
- Succeeded by: Sergey Leonov

Personal details
- Born: 16 June 1978 (age 48) Pyatigorsk, Stavropol Krai, RSFSR, USSR
- Party: United Russia
- Education: First Moscow State Medical University
- Occupation: Surgeon; Academic

Badma Nikolayevich Bashankayev (Russian: Бадма Николаевич Башанкаев; born 16 June 1978) is a Russian surgeon and politician who has served as a member of the State Duma since 19 September 2021. In the State Duma, he was chair of the committee on health care from 13 June 2023 to 26 November 2024.

== Early life and career ==
Bashankayev was born in 1978 in Pyatigorsk. In 2002 he graduated from the First Moscow State Medical University. He is a surgeon by profession.

== Political career ==
Bashankayev was a United Russia candidate in the 2021 Russian legislative election. He was elected to the State Duma in the Kalmykia constituency with 40.55 percent of the vote, replacing Marina Mukabenova who did not get re-nominated. Following his election, he was made deputy chair of the State Duma healthcare committee. Later, on June 13, 2023, he was appointed chairman of the health committee. In the 2026 Russian legislative election, Bashankayev was moved from Kalmykia constituency to the Jewish constituency, where he was elected with 55.57 percent of the vote; defeating Communist Party of the Russian Federation nominee Yevgeny Konopatkin.

== Political positions ==
=== War in Ukraine ===
Bashankayev is a supporter of Russian participation in the Russo-Ukrainian war. Due to this support, he has been internationally sanctioned by the United Kingdom since 2022. Also in 2022; Ukraine began criminal precedings against Bashankayev for his political involvement in the conflict.

== Scientific Career ==
As a surgeon; Bashankayev has been active in medicine primarily by publishing research. A majority of Bashankaev’s research focuses on large bowel oncology and surgical techniques for the rectum and colon. He has authored over 80 scientific papers published across both Russian and international scientific literature. His medical work has covered topics such as robotic surgery, large bowel cancer, gastrointestinal surgery, and emergency surgery.

Bashankayev is an editor of several scientific journals. These include the American journal Surgery; alongside various Russian journals such as Oncological Coloproctology, Evidence-Based Gastroenterology, and Non Nocere: A New Therapeutic Journal. He has also authored educational materials for use in medical schools.

Bashankayev is a member of several Russian medical organizations; including the Russian Society of Surgeons, the Russian Society of Endoscopic Surgeons, the Association of Coloproctologists of Russia, the Society of Specialists in Oncological Coloproctology. Internationally; he is a member of foreign organizations such as the American College of Surgeons, the American Society of Colon and Rectal Surgeons, and the Society of American Gastrointestinal and Endoscopic Surgeons.

== Personal life ==
He is married and has a child, who was born born in 2021.
