= Steven D. Wexner =

American physician

Steven D. Wexner FACS, FRCS(Eng), FRCS(Ed), FRCSI(Hon), FRCS(Glasg)(Hon), Hon FRCS (Eng), MAMSE
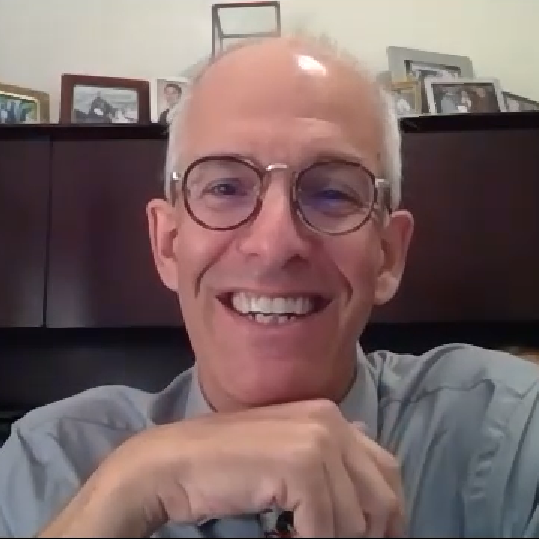
- Born: Steven David Wexner; February 3, 1957 (age 69); New York City, United States
- Education: Columbia University (BA, 1978); Weill Cornell Medicine (MD, 1982)
- Occupations: Surgeon, medical educator, researcher
- Years active: 1988–present
- Known for: Wexner Incontinence Score; Wexner Constipation Score; Pikarsky-Wexner Perianal Crohn's Score; Ileal pouch-anal anastomosis/J-pouch modifications; Founding Chair of NAPRC; Laparoscopic colorectal surgery program development; Fecal incontinence treatment research
- Spouse: Mariana Berho
- Children: 2
- Medical career
- Profession: Physician
- Field: Colorectal surgery
- Institutions: Georgetown University School of Medicine (2025–present); MedStar Health (2025–present); Cleveland Clinic Florida (1993–2024)
- Sub-specialties: Colorectal surgery, minimally invasive surgery
- Research: Fecal incontinence; Inflammatory bowel disease; Colorectal cancer; Pelvic floor disorders; Clinical scoring systems; Surgical innovation
- Notable works: Editor-in-Chief, Surgery
- Awards: Maimonides Award (2003); Master Clinician Award (2016); Honorary PhD, University of Belgrade (2012); 2026 Roswell Park Medal

Academic work
- Institutions: MedStar Health
- Main interests: Surgical education, healthcare equity
- Website: my.clevelandclinic.org/staff/202-steven-wexner

Steven D. Wexner is an American colorectal surgeon who developed clinical scoring systems used in colorectal surgery. He is the Physician Executive Director and System Chair for Colorectal Surgery at MedStar Health, and Professor of Surgery at Georgetown University School of Medicine, having previously served as Director of the Ellen Leifer Shulman and Steven Shulman Digestive Disease Center at Cleveland Clinic Florida from 2022-2025 and as chair of the Department of Colorectal Surgery at Cleveland Clinic Florida from 1993 to 2024.

He developed the Wexner Incontinence Score, the Wexner Constipation Score, and the Pikarsky-Wexner Perianal Crohn's Score, which are used to assess symptom severity in colorectal disorders. His research has focused on fecal incontinence, inflammatory bowel disease, and colorectal cancer. In 2020, he was elected vice-chair of the Board of Regents of the American College of Surgeons for a one-year term.

He was awarded the 2026 Roswell Park Medal by the Buffalo Surgical Society, and in September 2026, he was elected first vice-president-elect of the ACS.

== Early life and education ==
Steven Wexner is the son of Ira Howard Wexner, who served as a Justice of the Supreme Court of the State of New York and Supervising Judge of the Nassau District and County Courts, and Arlene. His decision to pursue medicine was influenced by two childhood experiences: his grandmother's fatal heart attack and his sister's emergency hospitalization.

Wexner received his bachelor's degree from Columbia University in 1978. He earned his MD in 1982 from Weill Cornell Medicine. He completed a general surgery residency in 1987 at Roosevelt Hospital (now Mount Sinai West). In 1988 he completed a fellowship in colon and rectal surgery at the University of Minnesota Medical School in Minneapolis.

== Career ==
In 1993, Wexner was named chairman of the Department of Colorectal Surgery at Cleveland Clinic Florida, a position he held until 2024 when he became Emeritus Chair. While at Cleveland Clinic he also served as Chairman of the Division of Research and Education from 1995 to 2012, as well as Chief of Staff from 1997 to 2008. He served as Chief Academic Officer from 2008 to 2012. In 2012 He was appointed the Director of the Digestive Diseases Center. In November 2025, Wexner was appointed Executive Director and System Chair for Colorectal Surgery at MedStar Health, covering 10 hospitals in the Washington, D.C. region. He concurrently serves as Professor of Surgery and Vice Chair for Professional Development in the Department of Surgery at Georgetown University School of Medicine.

As a founder of the National Accreditation Program for Rectal Cancer (NAPRC), he led a coalition to establish the accreditation program with the American College of Surgeon's Commission on Cancer. The NAPRC's goal is to implement educational and medical standards for rectal cancer treatment.

In November 2025, Wexner discussed the rising incidence of colorectal cancer among younger adults in a FOX 5 DC interview, attributing the trend to genetic, environmental, and dietary factors and noting that removal of precursor polyps during colonoscopy can prevent the disease. He said these cancers are often found at an advanced stage because patients and physicians ascribe rectal bleeding, changed bowel habits, or unexplained weight loss to hemorrhoids or irritable bowel syndrome. He recommended screening from age 45, or, for those with a family history, beginning ten years before the diagnosis age of the youngest first-degree relative with colorectal neoplasia.

== Research ==
Wexner has focused on research related to fecal incontinence treatment. In 1993, he and Marcio Jorge published a paper on the etiology and management of fecal incontinence that first presented what became known as the Wexner Incontinence Score.

In 2022, Cleveland Clinic Florida received a $5 million gift to fund Wexner's research. In recognition of their contribution, Cleveland Clinic Weston recognized the Shulmans by naming the Digestive Disease Center the Ellen Leifer Shulman and Steven Shulman Digestive Disease Center.

In a December 2020 interview with Local 10, Wexner said colorectal cancer was becoming more frequent in younger patients, which he attributed to genetic, environmental, and dietary factors. In a later television interview, he noted that symptoms in younger adults are often mistaken for hemorrhoids and that approximately half of colorectal cancer cases present without symptoms.

=== Clinical scoring systems ===
Wexner has developed several clinical scoring systems used in colorectal surgery and gastroenterology.

The Wexner Incontinence Score, also known as the Cleveland Clinic Incontinence Score, is a scoring system for assessing fecal incontinence severity. Developed with J. Marcio N. Jorge, the score evaluates five parameters—incontinence to solid stool, incontinence to liquid stool, incontinence to gas, need to wear a pad, and lifestyle alteration—each scored from 0 (never) to 4 (always), for a total score of 0 to 20.

The Wexner Constipation Score, also known as the Cleveland Clinic Constipation Score or Agachan-Wexner Score, is used for assessment of constipation severity. The score evaluates eight parameters including frequency of bowel movements, difficulty of evacuation, completeness of evacuation, abdominal pain, time spent on toilet, type of assistance required, unsuccessful attempts per 24 hours, and duration of constipation.

In 2002, Wexner and colleagues developed a scoring system specifically for perianal Crohn's disease to predict surgical outcomes. This scoring system incorporates patient history and physical examination findings to assess disease activity and predict the likelihood of successful surgical intervention.

=== J-pouch procedures ===
Wexner's work has focused on surgical techniques for the avoidance of permanent stomas in patients with colorectal cancer, ulcerative colitis, and fecal incontinence. He introduced a modification to the technique for creating an ileo-anal pouch, or j-pouch for ulcerative colitis, in which double stapling is used in place of sutures. He also worked on the colonic j-pouch for patients with rectal cancer. The J-pouch is an alternative to a permanent ileostomy or colostomy, allowing patients who have had their colons removed to continue to have bowel movements without an ostomy bag. This is now part of standard care for patients with rectal carcinoma.

=== Minimally invasive surgery ===
Wexner established a laparoscopic colorectal surgery program at Cleveland Clinic Florida in 1991. He has studied the use of fluorescence imaging with indocyanine green (ICG) to assess bowel perfusion during colorectal surgery, including leading an international Delphi consensus survey on the technique. He has worked on transanal total mesorectal excision (TaTME) techniques and has collaborated with Karl Storz GmbH and Intuitive Surgical on surgical instrument development.

=== Patents ===
Wexner has been granted six patents and has licensed intellectual property:

- US patent 20090281560A1, Wexner, Steven D. & Regadas, Francisco Sergio Pinheiro, "Method for anastomosis surgery using zip-ties", published 2009-11-12
- WO patent 2010030707A1, Regadas, Francisco Sergio Pinheiro & Wexner, Steven D., "Surgical string applicator for anastomosis surgery and method of use", published 2010-03-18
- US patent 7954251B2, Wexner, Steven D.; Nunes, Rogean R. & Regadas, Francisco Sergio Pinheiro, "Multifunctional airway evaluator for orotracheal intubation", published 2011-06-07
- US patent 8211129B2, Regadas, Francisco Sergio Pinheiro & Wexner, Steven D., "Method for anastomosis surgery using zip-ties", published 2012-07-03
- US patent D682425S1, Wexner, Steven D.; Nunes, Rogean R. & Regadas, Francisco Sergio Pinheiro, "Airway evaluator for orotracheal intubation", published 2013-05-14
- US patent 9526502B2, Regadas, Francisco Sergio Pinheiro & Wexner, Steven D., "Surgical string applicator for anastomosis surgery", published 2016-12-27
- US patent 20170056020A1, Regadas, Francisco Sergio Pinheiro & Wexner, Steven D., "Surgical string applicator for anastomosis surgery and method of use", published 2017-03-02

== Honors and awards ==
Wexner has received fellowship from five Royal Colleges: FRCS from the Royal College of Surgeons in Edinburgh (1999); FRCS ad eundum from the Royal College of Surgeons (2000); election to fellowship of the Royal College of Surgeons of England (2008); Honorary Fellowship from the Royal College of Surgeons in Ireland (2017); Honorary Fellowship from the Royal College of Physicians and Surgeons of Glasgow (2019); and Honorary Fellowship from the Royal College of Surgeons of England (2022).

In 2024, he was elected as an Honorary Fellow of The Society of Black Academic Surgeons.

Wexner received an honorary PhD from the University of Belgrade (2012) and the Maimonides Award from the American Jewish Committee (2003). He was named Professor Emeritus of I.M. Sechenov First Moscow State Medical University (2013), Master Clinician at Cleveland Clinic Florida (2016), appointed as Honorary Professor at University College London (2018), inducted as a member of the Academy of Master Surgeon Educators (2019), and appointed visiting professor in the Department of Surgery and Cancer at Imperial College London and Honorary Consultant at Imperial College Healthcare NHS Trust (2022).

In 2025, Wexner was included in the "America's Leading Doctors" listing for colorectal surgery published by Newsweek and Statista.

In 2026, Wexner won the 2026 Roswell Park Medal by the Buffalo Surgical Society.

== Professional memberships ==
From 2011 to 2012, Wexner served as president of the American Society of Colon and Rectal Surgeons, for which he gave a Presidential Address in 2012. Prior to that, from 2010 to 2011 he served as president of the American Board of Colon and Rectal Surgery. He also served as president of the Society of American Gastrointestinal and Endoscopic Surgeons (SAGES) from 2006 to 2007. In 2007 he delivered the SAGES Presidential Address entitled "Trials and tribulations in the history of surgical innovation."

Wexner served on the Board of Regents of the American College of Surgeons from 2012 to 2021, including as vice-chair from 2020-2021. Within this organization he is on the executive committee for the Commission on Cancer. He was also the founding chair of the National Accreditation Program for Rectal Cancer from 2018-2025.

Wexner has served as the president of the American Society of Colon and Rectal Surgeons Research Foundation (2014-2016), the Florida Gastroenterologic Society (2004-2005), and South Florida Chapter of the American College of Surgeons (2000-2004, two terms). He served for six years as a governor to the ACS, was past chair of the ACS advisory council for colon and rectal surgery from 2001-2005, and was a member of the Accreditation Council for Graduate Medical Education residency review committee for colon and rectal surgery from 1999-2004. In addition to being licensed in multiple states in the United States, Wexner is licensed in the United Kingdom with the General Medical Council and he is listed as a colorectal surgeon on the specialist register.

== Publications ==
Wexner is the co-editor-in-chief of Surgery.

As of 2025, Wexner had authored more than 1,100 peer-reviewed publications and 274 textbook chapters, and had edited 44 books.

In 2019, the Journal of Coloproctology published an analysis of the top 100 cited papers in benign anorectal disease which listed Wexner as the second most cited author, with 5 papers authored or co-authored by him among the top 100. His 1993 paper with Marcio Jorge, "Etiology and Management of Fecal Incontinence," was ranked as the most cited paper on benign anorectal disease.

Wexner also published studies which resulted in the eponymous Wexner Incontinence Score and the Wexner Constipation Score, as well as the Pikarsky Wexner Perianal Crohn's Score:

- Wexner, Steven D.; Marcio, Jorge (January 1993). "Etiology and Management of Fecal Incontinence". Diseases of the Colon and Rectum. 36 (1): 77–97. doi:10.1007/BF02050307. PMID 8416784. S2CID 37223486.
- Wexner, Steven D.; Agachan, Feran; Chen, Teng; Pfeifer, Johann; Reissman, Petachia (June 1996). "A constipation scoring system to simplify evaluation and management of constipated patients". Diseases of the Colon and Rectum. 39 (6): 681–685. doi:10.1007/BF02056950. PMID 8646957. S2CID 10924994.
- Wexner, Steven D.; Pikarsky, Alon J.; Gervas, Pascal (July 2002). "Perianal Crohn Disease: A New Scoring System to Evaluate and Predict Outcome of Surgical Intervention". Archives of Surgery. 137 (7): 774–777. doi:10.1001/archsurg.137.7.774. PMID 12093328.

=== Selected books ===
- S.R. Steele, J.A. Maykel, S.D. Wexner (Eds.), (2020). Clinical Decision Making in Colorectal Surgery, 2nd ed. Springer Nature Switzerland. ISBN 978-3-319-65942-8
- David E. Beck (Author), Steven D. Wexner (Author), Janice F. Rafferty (Author) (2019). Gordon and Nivatvongs' Principles and Practice of Surgery for the Colon, Rectum, and Anus, 4th ed. Thieme. ISBN 1626234299
- David E. Beck, Scott R. Steele, Steven D. Wexner (2019). Fundamentals of Anorectal Surgery, 3rd ed. Springer Nature Switzerland. ISBN 3319659650
- Steven D. Wexner (Author), James W. Fleshman (Author) (2019). Colon and Rectal Surgery: Abdominal Operations (Master Techniques in Surgery), 2nd ed. Wolters Kluwer. ISBN 1496347234
- Steven D. Wexner (Author), James W. Fleshman (Author) (2019). Colon and Rectal Surgery: Anorectal Operations (Master Techniques in Surgery), 2nd ed. Wolters Kluwer. ISBN 1496348575
- David E. Beck, Steven D. Wexner, et al. (2014). The ASCRS Manual of Colon and Rectal Surgery, 2nd ed. Springer New York.
- Andrew P. Zbar, Robert D. Madoff, Steven D. Wexner (2013). Reconstructive Surgery of the Rectum, Anus and Perineum. Springer. ISBN 1848824122
- Steven D. Wexner, Andrew P. Zbar, Mario Pescatori (2010). Complex Anorectal Disorders: Investigation and Management. Springer. ISBN 1849968969
- Andrew P. Zbar, Steven D. Wexner (2010). Coloproctology (Springer Specialist Surgery Series). Springer. ISBN 1848827555
- N. Stollman, Steven D. Wexner (2007). Disease of the Colon, 1st ed. Informa Healthcare. ISBN 0824729994
- Steven D. Wexner, Graeme S. Duthrie (2006). Constipation: Etiology, Evaluation and Management. Springer. ISBN 1849968969
- G. Davila, G. Ghoneim G, Steven D. Wexner (2006). Pelvic Floor Dysfunction, 1st ed. Springer. ISBN 1852337303
- Steven D. Wexner et al. (2006). Diverticular Disease: Emerging Evidence in Common Conditions, 1st ed. Springer. ISBN 1849968969
- Steven D. Wexner, Andrew P. Zbar, Mario Pescatori (2005). Complex Anorectal Disorders. Investigation and Management, 1st ed. Springer. ISBN 185233-6900
- Steven D. Wexner (Section Ed.), B. MacFadyen (Section Ed.) (2004). Laparoscopic Surgery of the Abdomen. Springer-Verlag. ISBN 978-0-387-98468-1
- P. Boulos, Steven D. Wexner (2000). Current Challenges in Colorectal Surgery, 1st ed. W. B. Saunders. ISBN 0-7020-2559-3
- Steven D. Wexner, (1999). Protocols in General Surgery: Laparoscopic Colorectal Surgery. ISBN 0471240303

=== Selected articles ===
- Wexner, Steven D.; Nelson, Heidi; Stain, Steven C.; Turner, Patricia L.; Cortés-Guiral, Delia (September 2020). "The American College of Surgeons Response to the COVID-19 Pandemic (Part I): Cancer Care, COVID-19 Registry, Surgeon Wellness". The American Surgeon. 86 (7): 751–756. doi:10.1177/0003134820940771. PMID 32916067.
- Wexner, Steven D.; Opelka, Frank; Bailey, Patrick V.; Cortés-Guiral, Deila (September 2020). "The American College of Surgeons Response to the COVID-19 Pandemic (Part II): Advocacy and Public Policy". The American Surgeon. 86 (7): 757–761. doi:10.1177/0003134820936614. PMID 32916074. S2CID 221636992.
- Wexner, Steven D.; Hoyt, David B.; Cortes-Guiral, Delia (September 2020). "The American College of Surgeons Response to the COVID-19 Pandemic (Part III): Leadership in a Time of Crisis". The American Surgeon. 86 (7): 762–765. doi:10.1177/0003134820940772. PMID 32916069. S2CID 221636398.
- Keller, Deborah S.; Berho, Mariana; Brown, Gina; Hull, Tracy; Moeslein, Gabriela; Wexner, Steven D. (July 2020). "A narrative celebrating the recent contributions of women to colorectal surgery". Surgery. 168 (3): 355–362. doi:10.1016/j.surg.2020.06.024. PMID 32741622. S2CID 220942775.
- Qing, S.H.; Rao, K.Y.; Jiang, H.Y.; Wexner, S.D. (April 2003). "Racial differences in the anatomical distribution of colorectal cancer: a study of differences between American and Chinese patients". World Journal of Gastroenterology. 9 (4): 721–725. doi:10.3748/wjg.v9.i4.721. PMC 4611437. PMID 12679919.
- Sharp, S.P.; Ata, A.; Chismark, A.D.; Wexner, S.D. (June 2020). "Racial disparities after stoma construction in colorectal surgery". Colorectal Disease. 22 (6): 713–722. doi:10.1111/codi.14943. PMID 31876362. S2CID 209482820.

== Education and teaching ==
Since 1990, Wexner has served as Symposium Director of the Cleveland Clinic Annual International Colorectal Disease Symposium. He has held over 80 visiting professorships and trains 15–20 surgeons annually through fellowship programs.

Wexner is a contributor to the AIS (Advances in Surgery) Channel, an online surgical education platform established in 2014; his broadcasts have covered robotic colorectal surgery techniques and healthcare diversity.

During the COVID-19 pandemic, Wexner hosted "A Surgeon's Voice", a video series for the American College of Surgeons in which he interviewed more than 100 surgeons about their experiences during the pandemic.

== Personal life ==
Wexner is married to Mariana Berho, a colorectal pathologist who served as chair of pathology at Cleveland Clinic Florida from 2004 to 2023.
