= Priyutny =

Priyutny (Russian: Приютный; masculine), Priyutnaya (Приютная; feminine), or Priyutnoye (Приютное; neuter) is the name of several rural localities in Russia:

- Priyutny (rural locality), a khutor in Novoderevyankovsky Rural Okrug of Kanevskoy District in Krasnodar Krai; 46°12′N 38°43′E
- Priyutnoye, Republic of Kalmykia, a selo in Priyutnenskaya Rural Administration of Priyutnensky District in the Republic of Kalmykia; 46°6′N 43°31′E
- Priyutnoye, Orenburg Oblast, a selo in Priyutinsky Selsoviet of Totsky District in Orenburg Oblast
