= National Accreditation Program for Rectal Cancer =

National Accreditation Program for Rectal Cancer

The National Accreditation Program for Rectal Cancer (NAPRC) was formed to address the differences between patient outcomes in the United States as compared to Europe. According to the American College of Surgeons, outcomes for rectal cancer patients in Europe have for years been significantly better than for those in the U.S. Characterized by the use of multidisciplinary teams to make treatment decisions, the NAPRC standards aim to decrease the average circumferential resection margins, decrease the overall colostomy rate, and increase quality of life as reported by recovering patients.

Two statistics illustrate the difference in treatment. A decade ago, the colostomy rate in Europe ranged from 25 percent to 35 percent, while today’s colostomy rate in the U.S. is about 50 percent, meaning that many more patients in the U.S. have colostomies as compared to Europeans. Rectal cancer cases in the U.S. have an average circumferential resection margins (CRMs) rate of 17 percent, significantly higher than the 3 percent to 11 percent range for European countries.

== Background ==
Collaboration between numerous professional organizations served as the driving force behind the creation of the NAPRC and its standards. To create the new standards and address the disparities between treatment in Europe and the U.S., the OSTRiCh (Optimizing Surgical Treatment of Rectal Cancer) Consortium was created by the American College of Surgeons and its Commission on Cancer (CoC) working with the American Society of Colon and Rectal Surgeons (ASCRS), the College of American Pathologists, the American College of Radiology, the Society of Gastrointestinal and Endoscopic Surgeons (SAGES), the Society for the Surgery of the Alimentary Tract and Society of Surgical Oncology. Lead members of the steering committee include Steven D. Wexner, MD, FACS, past president of the ASCRS, and Frederick L. Greene, MD, FACS, past chair of the CoC. The NAPRC is the fourth accreditation program approved by the CoC.

Prior to the CoC's creation of the NAPRC, a study was conducted on the current state of treatment in the US. The study was published in the Journal of the American College of Surgeons. The results showed that the full set of proposed quality standards were only met in 28.1% of patients, who were all diagnosed between 2011 and 2014 with non-metastatic rectal cancer. The completion of these measures varied based on location of the facility, type of facility, insurance, race, stage of disease, and operative volume. The study's authors plan to review the data once more in two or three years, According to the CoC, an inclusive approach was taken with the goal of providing the maximum number of patients with the option to go to an accredited facility.

In June 2017 the ACS issued a press release stating that the NAPRC is accepting applications. Accreditation requires previous CoC accreditation, an on-site visit, and records showing that NAPRC standards have been in place for no less than twelve months.

The chair of the NAPRC is Steven D. Wexner, MD. The vice chair is James W. Fleshman, Jr., MD.

== Standards ==
One of the main requirements of maintaining NAPRC accreditation is having multidisciplinary teams, i.e., the establishment and use of teams that include not only the surgeon, but also representatives from pathology, radiology, imaging, and medical oncology. This is similar to the existing National Accreditation Program for Breast Cancer, which various facilities already have in place. This team model is based on European standards of care and medical practice, and it entails collaboration by team members on decisions regarding therapy and all aspects of surgical treatment. When these multidisciplinary teams were put into place in Europe, they saw improved outcomes for patients as well as a decrease in recurrence rates and an increase in overall survival rates.

Another main requirement is the use of synoptic rather than narrative reporting. According to the American College of Surgeons, synoptic reports have been shown to collect 99 percent of critical patient data, while narrative reports typically capture less than 50 percent, according to studies on the subject. When patients are provided with specific checklists and questions, they report significantly more details which may be pertinent to future care.

Overall there are 22 different standards in the accreditation program, which each fall into one of three categories: program management, clinical services, or quality improvement. These were tested at six hospitals prior to being finalized.

Standard Number	Standard
Chapter 1	Program Management
1.1	Commission on Cancer Accreditation
1.2	Rectal Cancer Multidisciplinary Care
1.3	Rectal Cancer Multidisciplinary Team Attendance
1.4	Rectal Cancer Multidisciplinary Team Meetings
1.5	Rectal Cancer Program Director
1.6	Rectal Cancer Program Coordinator
1.7	Rectal Cancer Program Education
Chapter 2	Clinical Services
2.1	Review of Diagnostic Pathology
2.2	Staging before Definitive Treatment
2.3	Standardized Staging Reporting for Magnetic Resonance Imaging Results
2.4	Carcinoembryonic Antigen Level
2.5	Rectal Cancer Multidisciplinary Team Treatment Planning Discussion
2.6	Treatment Evaluation and Recommendation Summary
2.7	Definitive Treatment Timing
2.8	Surgical Resection and Standardized Operative Reporting
2.9	Pathology Reports after Surgical Resection
2.10	Photographs of Surgical Specimens
2.11	Multidisciplinary Team Treatment Outcome Discussion
2.12	Treatment Outcome Discussion Summary
2.13	Adjuvant Therapy after Surgical Resection
Chapter 3	Quality Improvement
3.1	Rapid Quality Reporting System
3.2	Accountability and Quality Improvement Measures

== Accredited programs ==
The NAPRC began accepting applications in July 2017.

As of June 2018, the following institutions have completed the full survey process to receive accreditation:

John Muir Health Rectal Program in Walnut Creek and Concord, CA

Cleveland Clinic Weston Rectal Cancer Program in Weston, FL
