= Mark Talamini =

American surgeon

Mark A. Talamini
- Occupations: Surgeon, professor
- Employer: Northwell Health
- Known for: Minimally invasive gastrointestinal surgery
- Title: Senior Vice President, Northwell Health, Executive Director, Northwell Health Physician Partners

Mark A. Talamini is an American surgeon and healthcare executive. He is the senior vice president of Northwell Health and executive director of Northwell Health Physician Partners (NHPP), Northwell’s medical group practice. In this role, he has helped establish physician well-being programs across Northwell's 28 hospitals, which contributed to the system receiving a Silver-level designation under the American Medical Association's (AMA) Joy in Medicine Health System Recognition Program.

He launched Northwell Health's weekly physician newsletter at Northwell, which reaches nearly half of the medical group each week, and Talks with Talamini, a regular podcast series.

Talamini is also the editor-in-chief of Surgical Endoscopy, the journal of the Society of American Gastrointestinal and Endoscopic Surgeons (SAGES) and the European Association for Endoscopic Surgery (EAES).

== Biography ==
Talamini is from Glen Ridge, New Jersey. He completed his medical school and residency training at Johns Hopkins University, where he subsequently joined the faculty. Talamini directed the minimally invasive surgery program at Johns Hopkins Hospital from 1992 to 2004. He subsequently became chairman of the Department of Surgery at the University of California, San Diego School of Medicine. From 2008 to 2009, Talamini was president of SAGES.

In 2015, he was appointed chairman of the Department of Surgery, founding director of the Stony Brook Medical Innovation Institute, and chief of surgical services at Stony Brook University School of Medicine. He was also co-director of Stony Brook's Surgical Outcomes Analysis Research (SOAR) Collaborative.

He left Stony Brook to join Northwell Health in 2021, where he is Senior Vice President and Executive Director of Northwell Health Physician Partners (NHPP).
