= Marina Mukabenova =

Russian politician (born 1982)

- Марина Алексеевна Мукабенова
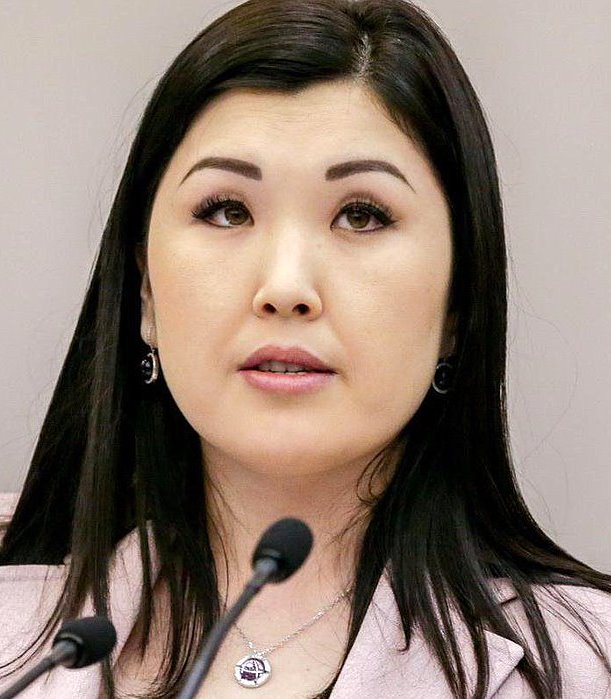

Member of the State Duma for Kalmykia
- In office 5 October 2016 – 12 October 2021
- Preceded by: constituency re-established
- Succeeded by: Badma Bashankayev
- Constituency: Kalmykia-at-large (No. 15)

Member of the State Duma (Party List Seat)
- In office 2 December 2007 – 5 October 2016

Personal details
- Born: 20 March 1982 (age 44) Kaspiysky, Kalmyk ASSR, RSFSR, USSR
- Party: United Russia
- Education: Kalmyk State University

Marina Alekseyevna Mukabenova (Russian: Марина Алексеевна Мукабенова; born 20 March 1982) is a Russian politician. She formerly represented Kalmykia in the State Duma's seventh convocation. She was deputy chairman of the Duma's Committee on Information Policy, Information Technology and Communications.

== See also ==
- Results of the 2016 Russian legislative election by constituency
- List of members of the 7th Russian State Duma
- List of members of the 7th Russian State Duma who were not re-elected
