= Perm State Humanitarian Pedagogical University =

- Пермский государственный гуманитарно-педагогический университет
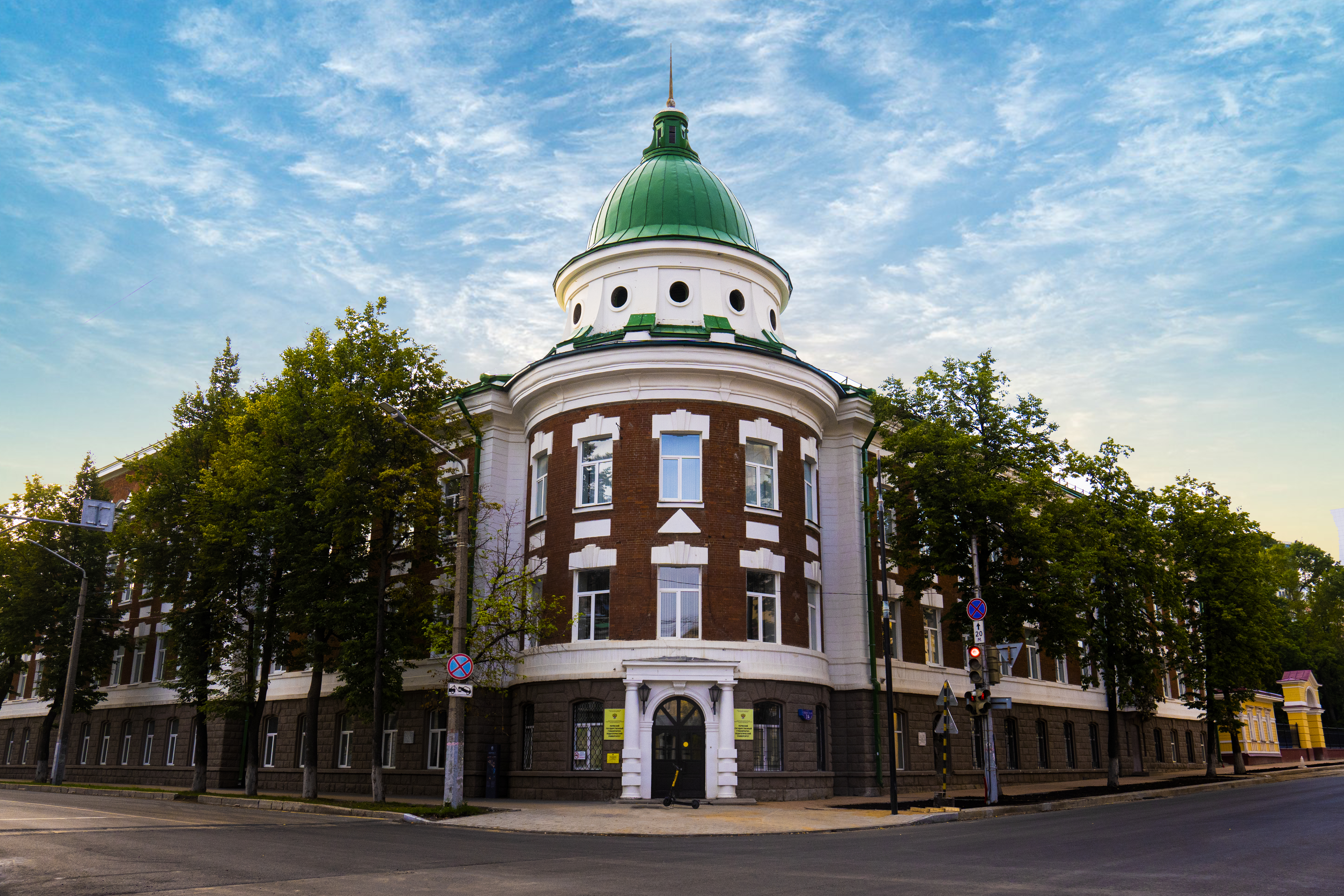
- Type: public
- Established: 1921
- Location: Perm, Russia
- Campus: urban
- Language: Russian

Perm State Humanitarian Pedagogical University (Russian: Пермский государственный гуманитарно-педагогический университет) is a public university located in Perm, Russia. It was founded in 1921.

== History ==
In 1916, it was decided to open a branch of the Imperial Petrograd University in Perm, which a year later became the independent Perm State University. The newly built building of the Provincial Zemstvo Office on Sibirskaya Street was given to the needs of the university.

On October 2, 1919, the Institute of public education (INE) was created in Perm. On September 9, 1921, by resolution of the planning committee of the Main Department of Education the Perm Institute of Public Education was transformed into a teacher training institute, which is considered to be the date of its birth. Initially it had three departments: pre-school education, pedagogical and school-instructional. However, in 1922 the institute ceased to exist as an independent educational institution.

In July, 1922 the teachers and students of the institute were united with the Perm state university; together with the faculty of social sciences and shortened physical and mathematical faculty they formed the Pedagogical department.

On the 15th of October 1930 the Pedagogical department was reorganized into an independent educational institution - Perm Industrial and Pedagogical Institute, by the order of Narkompros (People's Commissariat for Education). At the time of its establishment the Institute had 9 departments. From October 15, 1930, to 1940 it had trained 4000 teachers.

In the post-war years, new faculties were opened at the institute, including foreign languages. In the 1950s, a new academic building on Pushkin Street was built, and later two more buildings were added. by the 1970s, the institute had become one of the leading pedagogical universities in the country.

In 1994, the status of the university was changed: Perm State Pedagogical Institute was renamed into Perm State Pedagogical University (PSPU) by Order No. 290 of the Minister of Education of the Russian Federation of July 27, 1994. In 2012, in accordance with the order of the Ministry of Education and Science on May 25, 2012, the Perm State Pedagogical University was renamed into Perm State University for Humanities and Pedagogy (PGPU).

At the beginning of the 2020s the university had more than 7000 students. Specialist diploma (5 years of training) can be obtained in 26 specialties, Bachelor diploma (4 years) in 2 directions, Master's degree (6 years) in one direction. There are postgraduate departments in 14 specialties and doctoral department in "General psychology, personality psychology, history of psychology".

== Structure ==
- Mathematics Faculty
- Faculty of Philology
- Faculty of History
- Faculty of Physics
- Natural Science faculty
- Faculty of Informatics and Economics
- Faculty of foreign languages
- Faculty of Music
- Faculty of Physical Education
- Faculty of Pedagogy and Childhood Psychology
- Faculty of Pedagogy and Methodology of Primary Education
- Faculty of Law and Social and Pedagogical Education
- Institute of Psychology.

== Famous graduates ==
=== Athletes ===
- Vladimir Alikin - biathlete, Champion of the 1980 Winter Olympics in the 4x7.5 km relay, multiple world and USSR champion, honored coach of Russia.
- Svetlana Vysokova - speed skater, bronze medalist of the 2006 Winter Olympics at a distance of 500 m in the team race, multiple champion of Russia
- Mikhail Devyatyarov - 1988 Winter Olympics champion in the 15 km race (cross-country skiing)
- Pavel Sadyrin - Soviet football player and Russian football coach. Master of Sport. Honored Trainer of the RSFSR.
- Natalia Tomilova - Russian athlete, world champion in orienteering (2002).

=== Cultural and scientific figures ===
- Ivavn Dergachyov - Russian literary critic, Doctor of Philology, professor.
- Grigory Konovalov - member of the Union of Soviet Writers, laureate of the State Prize of the RSFSR.
- Pavel Lebedev - Soviet botanist, Doctor of Biological Sciences, professor, founder of the Ural school of morphologists.
- Yelena Shumkova - Russian opera singer, soloist of the Perm Opera and Ballet Theatre. Voice: coloratura soprano.

=== Statesmen ===
- Alexander Petrov - Russian statesman, deputy of the 6th State Duma from the United Russia party, member of the State Duma Committee on Health Protection.
