= George Berci =

Hungarian-American surgeon and inventor (1921–2024)

- Born: Gyorgy Bleier; 14 March 1921; Szeged, Hungary
- Died: 30 August 2024 (aged 103); Los Angeles, California, United States of America
- Education: University of Szeged
- Medical career
- Field: Surgery
- Institutions: Cedars-Sinai Medical Center
- Research: Laparoscopy

George Berci (né Bleier; 14 March 1921 – 30 August 2024) was a Hungarian-American surgeon at Cedars-Sinai Medical Center in Los Angeles, United States and a pioneer in minimally invasive surgeries. He developed instruments for laparoscopic surgery that have been incorporated into minimally invasive surgery techniques used today.

== Background ==
Berci was born as Gyorgy Bleier in Szeged, Hungary on 14 March 1921, and spent time in both Hungary and Austria as a boy. He became a Jewish conscripted laborer for the Hungarians in 1942 and narrowly escaped deportation to Auschwitz in 1944 on a train near Budapest. He made his way to Budapest and worked for the Hungarian underground until World War II ended. He lost his father and grandfather in the Holocaust, but his mother survived. Berci wanted to become a musician, but his mother insisted that he become a doctor. He graduated from medical school at the University of Szeged in 1950 and took a position as a surgeon at the University Hospital in Budapest. By then, he changed his surname to Berci.

Berci turned 100 on 14 March 2021, and he died from complications of COVID-19 in Los Angeles, on 30 August 2024, at the age of 103.

== Career ==
In 1956, when the Hungarian Revolution took place, Berci was one of six doctors awarded a two-year Rockefeller Fellowship and he went to Melbourne, Australia. In 1962, he developed the first miniature camera to use with an endoscope, which contributed to the development of video endoscopy. In the early 1960s, he performed some of the first fluoroscopic cholangiograms in the world. He was recruited in 1967 to move to Los Angeles and join Cedars-Sinai as a visiting scholar in the Department of Surgery. Three years into his time at Cedars-Sinai, he became the director of the multidisciplinary surgical endoscopy unit. In 1989, he and John Hunter started national surgical training courses to ensure that surgeons were performing the techniques correctly. He served as the president of the Society of American Gastrointestinal and Endoscopic Surgeons in 1992. In 2012, Berci opened the George Berci Surgical Training and Research Laboratory of Department of Surgical Research and Techniques in Budapest, Hungary. He published more than 200 research papers and published textbooks and chapters on endoscopic surgery.
