= Surgical Endoscopy =

Medical journal covering surgical endoscopy techniques

- Discipline: Surgery
- Language: English
- Edited by: George Hanna, Mark Talamini

Publication details
- History: 1986
- Publisher: Springer Science+Business Media
- Frequency: Monthly
- Impact factor: 3.747 (2016)

Standard abbreviations
- ISO 4: Surg. Endosc.

Indexing
- ISSN: 0930-2794 (print); 1432-2218 (web)

Links
- Journal homepage

Surgical Endoscopy is a peer-reviewed medical journal published by Springer Science+Business Media. It is the official journal of the Society of American Gastrointestinal and Endoscopic Surgeons and the European Association for Endoscopic Surgery.

Surgical Endoscopy covers the surgical aspects of interventional endoscopy, ultrasound, and other techniques in gastroenterology, obstetrics, gynecology, and urology. Also, the fields of gastroenterologic, thoracic, traumatic, orthopedic, and pediatric surgery are represented. The journal has a 2016 impact factor of 3.747.

The editors-in-chief are George Hanna (St Mary's Hospital) and Mark Talamini (Stony Brook University). Editors emeriti include Alfred Cuschieri, Kimberly Forde and Bruce MacFadyen Jr.
