= Alfred Cuschieri =

Maltese-British academic and surgeon

Sir Alfred Cuschieri FRSE FMedSci
- Born: 30 September 1938 (age 88); Sliema, Malta
- Education: Royal University of Malta
- Known for: Pioneering minimal access surgery Surgical Endoscopy
- Scientific career
- Fields: Surgery
- Workplaces: University of Malta; University of Dundee; Scuola Superiore Sant'Anna; University of Liverpool

Sir Alfred Cuschieri FRSE FMedSci (born 30 September 1938) is a Maltese-British surgeon and academic. He is most notable for his pioneering contribution to the development and clinical implementation of minimal access surgery, also known as key-hole surgery. He has been Professor of Surgery at the Scuola Superiore Sant'Anna in Pisa, Italy, since 2003 as well as Chief Scientific Advisor to the Institute of Medical Science and Technology at the University of Dundee since 2008.

Sir Alfred Cuschieri, was born in Malta, his parents were Italian and Maltese (his father was from Florence).

== Career ==
Cuschieri obtained his medical degree from the Royal University of Malta in 1961. Soon after graduation he left Malta for the United Kingdom to undertake further research into his areas of surgical and technological interest at the University of Liverpool. At Liverpool, he rose to become a lecturer in the medical school and then, in 1974, to a Personal Chair in Surgery.

In 1976, Cuschieri moved to Scotland to join the University of Dundee School of Medicine as Professor of Surgery and Chairman of the Surgery and Molecular Oncology Department. It was while working at Ninewells Hospital in the city that he and his team first began researching the medical and technological basis for minimal access surgery. Cuschieri's team took advantage of, among other internal and external ergonomic developments, smaller cameras allowing insertion into the incision made in the skin; as a result of this progress the first minimally invasive surgery in the UK was carried out at Ninewells in 1987.

A lack of appropriate training in this form of surgery, and instances of procedures going wrong even resulting in deaths, led to some concern and mistrust in the new techniques. As a result, training units were set up at hospitals and medical schools around the UK with one of the first designated in 1993 under Cuschieri's directorship. Cuschieri holds some fifty-eight patents for various surgical instruments and has been originally published around five hundred times in peer-reviewed journals. He became European Editor-in-Chief of Surgical Endoscopy in 1992.

== Honours and awards ==
- 1961 Pfizer Prize
- 1973 Moynihan Prize, Association of Surgeons of Great Britain & Ireland
- 1994 Honorary Fellow, Italian Surgical Society
- 1996 Ernest Miles Medal
- 1997 Gold Medal, Royal College of Surgeons of Edinburgh
- 1998 Knight Bachelor
- 1998 Fellow of the Academy of Medical Science
- 1998 Fellow of the Royal Society of Edinburgh
- 1999 Queen's Award for Higher and Continued Education
- 2003 President's Medal, Royal College of Surgeons of Edinburgh

== Publications ==
- Cuschieri, A. (1968). The Adrenal Glands in Cancer of the Breast. Liverpool: ChM Thesis.
- Cuschieri, A.; Baker, P. R. (1977). Introduction to Research in Medical Sciences. Edinburgh: Churchill Livingstone.
- Cuschieri, A.; Berci, G. (1984). Common Bile Duct Exploration. Boston: Martinus Nijhoff.
- Berci, G.; Cuschieri, A. (1986). Practical Laparoscopy. London: Bailliere Tindall.
- Cuschieri, A.; Berci, G. (1990). Laparoscopic Biliary Surgery, 1st Edition. Oxford: Blackwell Scientific Publications.
- Cuschieri, A.; Berci, G. (1992). Laparoscopic Biliary Surgery, 2nd Edition. Oxford: Blackwell Scientific Publications.
- Cuschieri, A.; Szabo, Z. (1995). Tissue Approximation in Endoscopic Surgery. Oxford: Isis Medical Media. ISBN 9781899066032.
- Berci, G.; Cuschieri, A. (1996). Bile Ducts and Bile Duct Stones. Philadelphia: Saunders.
