= American Board of Surgery =

Independent American medical specialty certification board

The American Board of Surgery (ABS) is an independent, non-profit organization located in Philadelphia, Pennsylvania, founded for the purpose of certifying surgeons who have met a defined standard of education, training and knowledge. Surgeons certified by the ABS, known as diplomates, have completed a minimum of five years of surgical residency training following medical school and successfully completed a written and oral examination process administered by the ABS. The ABS provides board certification in general surgery, vascular surgery, pediatric surgery, surgical critical care, surgery of the hand, hospice and palliative medicine, and complex general surgical oncology.

The ABS is composed of a board of directors representing the principal surgical organizations in the U.S. and is one of the 24 member boards of the American Board of Medical Specialties.

== History ==
The American Board of Surgery was officially organized on January 9, 1937. The formation of the ABS was the result of a committee formed a year earlier by the American Surgical Association with representatives from the American College of Surgeons, American Medical Association and the Southern, Western, Pacific Coast and New England Surgical Associations. The leaders of these organizations, including such figures as Drs. Edward Archibald, Evarts Ambrose Graham and Allen Whipple, had recognized for some time the need to differentiate well-trained surgeons who had limited their practice to surgery from doctors in general practice. They also felt that surgery as a field of medicine had matured into a full-time specialty.

The committee established the basic principles for a national certifying body for surgeons practicing in the U.S. The committee decided that the ABS should be formed of members from the represented organizations and, once organized, it would establish a comprehensive certification process. These findings and recommendations were approved by the cooperating societies, leading to the board's formation in 1937. This was done to protect the public and improve the specialty.

== Certification ==
Certification by the American Board of Surgery is a voluntary process, meant to designate individuals who have met the highest standards of education, training and knowledge in surgery. Board certification is different from medical licensure, which is required by law for an individual to practice medicine.

Upon completion of training at an accredited U.S. or Canadian residency program, a surgeon may apply to the ABS for certification. The applicant's training and operative experience are reviewed by the ABS, and the director of the training program must also attest to the applicant's professionalism and ethics, as well as surgical skills. If these are all satisfactory, the applicant is admitted to the ABS examinations required for certification. Upon successful completion of these examinations, the surgeon becomes a diplomate of the ABS.

Certification in general surgery is a prerequisite for certification in pediatric surgery, surgical critical care, surgery of the hand, hospice and palliative medicine, and complex general surgical oncology.

== Continuing Certification ==
To maintain certification, diplomates must demonstrate ongoing professionalism and commitment to continuing medical education (through seminars, lectures, reading of journals) and pass a written examination. In 2018, the ABS introduced a new program, the ABS Continuous Certification Program (CC), to replace what was previously known as Maintenance of Certification (MOC). Compared to MOC, which required a secure recertification examination at 10-year intervals, CC is a broader professional development program with more frequent requirements for learning and assessment. CC documents a surgeon's ongoing commitment to professionalism, lifelong learning, and practice improvement following initial board certification, and the new program has been designed to provide flexible, high-quality, practice-related learning and assessment to support surgeons in their practice. In surgical education, the use of structured question banks and digital learning tools has been associated with improved performance on in-training examinations among residents.

== See also ==
- American Osteopathic Board of Surgery
- Surgical Council on Resident Education
