= Society of American Gastrointestinal and Endoscopic Surgeons =

US professional organization

Society of American Gastrointestinal and Endoscopic Surgeons (SAGES)
- Formation: 1981
- Type: Professional Association
- Headquarters: Los Angeles, California
- Location: United States
- Members: 7000+
- Executive Director: Sallie Matthews
- Website: www.sages.org

The Society of American Gastrointestinal and Endoscopic Surgeons (SAGES) is a 501(c)(6) non-profit professional organization providing education on gastrointestinal minimally invasive surgery. It describes itself thus: The mission of the Society of American Gastrointestinal and Endoscopic Surgeons is to innovate, educate and collaborate to improve patient care.

It held its first Scientific Session, in tandem with Thomas Jefferson University, in Philadelphia in September, 1983 as part of the American College of Surgeons Clinical Congress, and held its first independent meeting in Williamsburg, Virginia, in 1986. With support from Springer-Verlag, publisher of Surgical Endoscopy, the 1st World Congress of Endoscopic Surgery was held in Berlin, Germany in 1988.

SAGES Members are primarily board certified (American Board of Surgery or American Osteopathic Association or the international equivalent) general surgeons with either an interest in or practice focused on endoscopic and/or laparoscopic surgery. Surgical Fellows, residents and medical school students interested in a career in surgery are also allowed in the membership, as are other health-care professionals involved in surgical care of patients.

The corresponding society for pediatric surgery is the International Pediatric Endosurgery Group (IPEG) that involves Pediatric Surgeons but includes surgeons from around the World.

== Publications ==
- MESSAGES: The Official SAGES E-Newsletter. Published monthly.
- Surgical Endoscopy: The official monthly journal of SAGES.
- It published its 1st manual Basic Laparoscopy and Endoscopy in 2000, and is now on its 3rd edition and split into 2 volumes. later its 2nd Manual Perioperative Care in Minimally Invasive Surgery (2005).

=== Clinical Practice/Training Guidelines, Statements, and Standards of Practice ===
SAGES focuses on providing education as to best practices in laparoscopic and endoscopic surgery by researching, developing and disseminating the guidelines and training for standards of practice in surgical procedures. It was one of the partners in the formation of the National Accreditation Program for Rectal Cancer, which began accepting applications in 2017. Guidelines are developed under the auspices of the organization and its various committees, and approved by the Board of Governors. Each clinical practice guideline has been systematically researched, reviewed and revised by the SAGES Guidelines Committee and also evaluated by an appropriate multidisciplinary team. Guidelines are scheduled for periodic review to allow incorporation of pertinent new developments in medical research knowledge, and practice. As of 2016, the following guidelines are active:

==== Clinical Practice ====
- Guidelines for Laparoscopic Ventral Hernia Repair (August 2014)
- Guidelines for Laparoscopic Peritoneal Dialysis Access Surgery (June 2014)
- Guidelines for the Management of Hiatal Hernia (May 2013)
- Guidelines for the Minimally Invasive Treatment of Adrenal Pathology (February 2013)
- Guidelines for Laparoscopic Resection of Curable Colon and Rectal Cancer (February 2012)
- Guidelines for the Surgical Treatment of Esophageal Achalasia (May 2011)
- Guidelines for Diagnosis, Treatment, and Use of Laparoscopy for Surgical Problems during Pregnancy (April 2011)
- Guidelines for Surgical Treatment of Gastroesophageal Reflux Disease (GERD) (February 2010)
- Guidelines for the Clinical Application of Laparoscopic Biliary Tract Surgery (January 2010)
- Guidelines for Laparoscopic Appendectomy (April 2009)
- Guidelines for the Use of Laparoscopic Ultrasound (March 2009)
- Guidelines For Office Endoscopic Services (November 2008)
- Guidelines for Clinical Application of Laparoscopic Bariatric Surgery (June 2008)
- Guidelines for Diagnostic Laparoscopy (November 2007)
- Guidelines for Deep Venous Thrombosis Prophylaxis During Laparoscopic Surgery (October 2006)
- Guidelines for the Surgical Practice of Telemedicine (March 2004)

==== Position Papers/Statements ====
- Ethical Considerations Regarding the Implementation of New Technologies and Techniques in Surgery (October 2014)
- Educational Mission Statement (April 2011)
- Position Statement on Advanced Laparoscopic Training (October 2010)
- Statement on the Relationship Between Professional Medical Associations and Industry (February 2010)
- Position Statement on Endolumenal Therapies for Gastrointestinal Diseases (November 2009)
- Integrating Advanced Laparoscopy into Surgical Residency Training — A SAGES Position Paper (April 2009)
- A Consensus Document on Robotic Surgery (November 2007)
- Laparoscopic Colectomy for Curable Cancer (June 2004)

==== Privileging Guidelines ====
- Joint Task Force Recommendations for Credentialing of Bariatric Surgeons (April 2015)
- Guidelines for Granting of Ultrasonography Privileges for Surgeons (April 2011)
- Guidelines for Institutions Granting Privileges Utilizing Laparoscopic and/or Thoracoscopic Techniques (July 2010)
- Guidelines for Institutions Granting Bariatric Privileges Utilizing Laparoscopic Techniques (July 2009)
- Granting of Privileges for Gastrointestinal Endoscopy (September 2007)

==== Training Guidelines and Outlines for Surgical Education ====
- Guidelines for Training in Diagnostic and Therapeutic Endoscopic Retrograde Cholangiopancreatography (ERCP) (July 2010)
- Framework for Post-Residency Surgical Education & Training (July 2010)
- Curriculum Outline for Resident Education (April 2009)
- ASCRS/SAGES Guidelines for Laparoscopic Colectomy Course (November 2005)

=== Patient Information ===
SAGES seeks to improve the overall value of patient care through promoting the adoption of and access to minimally invasive surgical techniques. To that end, the Society publishes several informational brochures that educate surgical candidates about the expectations and benefits of minimally invasive surgery.

- Upper Endoscopy Patient Information from SAGES (March 2015)
- Laparoscopic Ventral Hernia Repair Patient Information from SAGES (March 2015)
- Laparoscopic Surgery for Severe (Morbid) Obesity Patient Information from SAGES (March 2015)
- Laparoscopic Spleen Removal (Splenectomy) Patient Information from SAGES (March 2015)
- Laparoscopic Spine Surgery Patient Information from SAGES (March 2015)
- Laparoscopic Inguinal Hernia Repair Surgery Patient Information from SAGES (March 2015)
- Laparoscopic Gallbladder Removal (Cholecystectomy) Patient Information from SAGES (March 2015)
- Laparoscopic Colon Resection Surgery Patient Information from SAGES (March 2015)
- Laparoscopic Appendectomy Surgery Patient Information from SAGES (March 2015)
- Laparoscopic Anti-Reflux (GERD) Surgery Patient Information from SAGES (March 2015)
- Laparoscopic Adrenal Gland Removal (Adrenalectomy) Patient Information from SAGES (March 2015)
- Flexible Sigmoidoscopy Patient Information from SAGES (March 2015)
- ERCP (Endoscopic Retrograde Cholangio-Pancreatography) Patient Information from SAGES (March 2015)
- Diagnostic Laparoscopy Patient Information from SAGES (March 2015)
- Colonoscopy Patient Information from SAGES (March 2015)

== Fundamentals Programs ==
Beginning in 2007, SAGES launched a series of "Fundamentals" programs designed to standardize and teach surgeons and surgical residents the basics of laparoscopic (Fundamentals of Laparoscopic Surgery) and endoscopic (Fundamentals of Endoscopic Surgery) surgical techniques. In 2014, SAGES added the Fundamental Use of Surgical Energy (FUSE) program designed to teach the entire surgical staff about the safe use of surgical energy-based devices in the operating room, endoscopy suite and other procedural areas.

=== Fundamentals of Laparoscopic Surgery (FLS) ===
FLS is a comprehensive web-based education module that includes a hands-on skills training component and assessment tool designed to teach the physiology, fundamental knowledge, and technical skills required in basic laparoscopic surgery. The goal of the program is to provide surgical residents, fellows and practicing physicians an opportunity to learn the fundamentals of laparoscopic surgery in a consistent, scientifically accepted format; and to test cognitive, surgical decision-making, and technical skills, all with the goal of improving the quality of patient care. Initially developed as an optional program, comprehensive research on the effects of FLS on practicing surgeons lead the American Board of Surgery adopted FLS completion as mandatory for all applicants for board certification as of the 2009–2010 academic year.

=== Fundamentals of Endoscopic Surgery (FES) ===
The FES program is a comprehensive educational and assessment tool designed to teach and evaluate the fundamental knowledge, clinical judgment and technical skills required in the performance of basic gastrointestinal endoscopic surgery. The goal is to provide participants with an opportunity to learn the fundamentals of endoscopic surgery in a consistent, scientifically accepted format, and to test cognitive and technical skills. Like FLS, FES certification is required by the American Board of Surgery as part of their Flexible Endoscopy Curriculum as of the 2017–2018 academic year for applicants seeking ABS certification.

=== Fundamentals Use of Surgical Energy (FUSE) ===
FUSE is an educational program consisting of an interactive web-based multimedia-enhanced didactic curriculum and an online multiple choice cognitive exam. The program is being designed to certify that a successful candidate has the demonstrated knowledge fundamental to the safe use of surgical energy-based devices in the operating room, endoscopic suite and other procedural areas in order to prevent fires and burns to patients. The FUSE program was conceived after multiple studies indicated a knowledge gap between surgical staff and the use of energy devices which affected safety in the OR.

== Past Presidents of SAGES ==
- John D. Mellinger, MD (2022–2023)
- Liane S. Feldman, MD (2021–2022)
- Horacio J. Asbun, MD (2020–2021)
- Aurora Pryor, MD (2019–2020)
- Jeffrey Marks, MD (2018–2019)
- Daniel B. Jones, MD (2017–2018)
- Daniel J. Scott, MD (2016–2017)
- Brian J. Dunkin, MD (2015–2016)
- L. Michael Brunt, MD (2014–2015)
- Gerald M. Fried, MD (2013–2014)
- W. Scott Melvin, MD (2012–2013)
- Steven D. Schwaitzberg, MD (2011–2012)
- Jo Buyske, MD (2010–2011)
- C. Daniel Smith, MD (2009–2010)
- Mark A. Talamini, MD (2008–2009)
- Steve Eubanks, MD (2007–2008)
- Steven D. Wexner, MD (2006–2007)
- Daniel J. Deziel, MD (2005–2006)
- David W. Rattner, MD (2004–2005)
- Lee L. Swanstrom, MD (2003–2004)
- Bruce D. Schirmer, MD (2002–2003)
- L. William Traverso, MD (2001–2002)
- Nathaniel J. Soper, MD (2000–2001)
- Jeffrey H. Peters, MD (1999–2000)
- John Hunter, MD (1998–1999)
- Desmond H. Birkett, MD (1997–1999)
- Greg V. Stiegmann, MD (1996–1999)
- Richard M. Satava, MD (1995–1999)
- Bruce V. MacFadyen Jr. MD (1994–1999)
- George Berci, MD (1993–1993)
- Frederick L. Greene, MD (1991–1992)
- Jeffrey L. Ponsky, MD (1990–1991)
- Lee E. Smith, MD (1989)
- Talmadge (Joe) A. Bowden, MD (1988)
- Theodore R. Schrock, MD (1987)
- John A. Coller, MD (1986)
- James F. Lind, MD (1985)
- Thomas L. Dent, MD (1984–1985)
- Kenneth A. Forde, MD (1983)
- Gerald Marks, MD (1981–1982)

SAGES 2020–2021 SLATE OF OFFICERS PRESIDENT - Liane S. Feldman, MD PRESIDENT-ELECT - John D. Mellinger, MD 1st VICE PRESIDENT - Robert Lim, MD 2nd VICE PRESIDENT - Patricia Sylla, MD SECRETARY - Brent Matthews, MD TREASURER - Chris Schlachta, MD

== See also ==
- American Board of Surgery
- American College of Surgeons
- American Osteopathic Association
- American Society of Colon and Rectal Surgeons
- American Society for Metabolic & Bariatric Surgery
- Springer Science+Business Media
- Surgical Council for Resident Education
- Surgical Endoscopy
