= Surgical Council on Resident Education =

U.S. curriculum for medical training

Surgical Council on Resident Education (SCORE)
- Formation: 2004; 22 years ago
- Founder: The American Board of Surgery American College of Surgeons—Division of Education Association of Program Directors in Surgery American Surgical Association Association for Surgical Education Surgery Review Committee of the Accreditation Council for Graduate Medical Education Society of American Gastrointestinal Endoscopic Surgeons
- Legal status: Educational nonprofit
- Headquarters: Philadelphia, Pennsylvania
- Region served: United States
- Editor-in-Chief: Amit R.T. Joshi, MD, FACS
- Website: www.surgicalcore.org

The Surgical Council on Resident Education (SCORE) is the national curriculum for general surgery and its associated subspecialties, housed within the American Board of Surgery. It was originally founded as a nonprofit consortium in 2004 by seven organizations involved in U.S. surgical education. Initial efforts were led by Drs. Richard Bell and Frank Lewis.

The founding mission of SCORE was to improve the education of surgical trainees in general surgery and its related subspecialties. SCORE focuses its efforts on the five years of progressive training that constitute general surgery residency in the United States, following medical school but prior to independent practice. The seven founding organizations are The American Board of Surgery (ABS), American College of Surgeons—Division of Education (ACS-DOE), Association of Program Directors in Surgery (APDS), American Surgical Association (ASA), Association for Surgical Education (ASE), Surgery Review Committee (RC) of the Accreditation Council for Graduate Medical Education (ACGME), and Society of American Gastrointestinal Endoscopic Surgeons (SAGES).

SCORE's main objective is the creation of a standard national curriculum for general surgery residency training. The SCORE Curriculum Outline is based on the six physician competencies defined by the Accreditation Council for Graduate Medical Education and the American Board of Medical Specialties: patient care and procedural skills; medical knowledge; professionalism; communication; practice-based learning; and systems-based practice.

The initial curriculum outline was presented in 2008 via the SCORE web portal and focused on the competencies of patient care and medical knowledge, however, the site expanded to the six physician competencies.

In 2010, the portal became a subscription-only product. By 2012, >95% of general surgery training programs subscribed to SCORE. In 2015, This Week in SCORE (TWIS) was introduced as a way to organize the curriculum into a two-year repeating cycle.

== Overview of Content ==
SCORE develops and implements its material via an educational web portal, The SCORE® Portal. The site hosts a variety of content to assist program needs, including peer-reviewed modules, narrated operative videos, licensed chapters from leading surgical textbooks, peer-reviewed self-assessment questions, and an individualized curriculum program (This Week in SCORE).

SCORE's structure primarily focuses on the "module". In total, there are approximately 790+ modules as of 2019. Modules are organized into specific categories, with "Patient Care" being the largest. Each module is defined as "Core" or "Advanced" in order to better help programs and residents select content for review. Focused learning objectives, organized into concise bullet point format, is the focal content for each module. Each module has abundant resources from the SCORE portal or other appropriate, high-quality resources.

In addition to the module, SCORE also has an Assignments feature, which allows residency programs to create individualized assignments and track resident progress on a variety of customized topics.

SCORE now hosts specialty-specific content on its platform for Surgical Critical Care, Complex General Surgical Oncology, Vascular Surgery, Pediatric Surgery, and Oral and Maxillofacial Surgery.

== TWIS ==
In 2015, This Week in SCORE (TWIS) was offered as a topic-of-the-week program with a weekly peer-reviewed quiz. TWIS has an established curriculum sequence that programs could complete within a 2-year cycle. It was designed as an aid for program directors to deliver content.

On a given weekly cycle, SCORE implements a TWIS quiz for designated program residents. Program directors can interact with and analyze resident progress as well as move weekly topics to better fit with their program schedule.

== Executive Leadership ==
SCORE's Leadership team includes Amit R.T. Joshi, MD, FACS (Editor-in-Chief), Mark J. Hickey (Chief Operating Officer), Kerry B. Barrett (Content Management Specialist), James Giblin (Technical Operations Specialist), and Mads Bradley (Content Management Assistant).

Prior Editors-in-Chief are Mary E. Klingensmith, MD, FACS & Mark A. Malangoni, MD, FACS.

== Editorial Board ==
SCORE relies on several Editorial Boards to lead the peer-review process that every item on the portal undergoes. SCORE General Surgery also regularly convenes focus groups with trainees to solicit input from end-users.

== Founding organizations ==
The seven founding members of SCORE are: American Board of Surgery; American Surgical Association; American College of Surgeons; Association of Program Directors in Surgery; Association for Surgical Education; Residency Review Committee for Surgery of the ACGME; and Society of American Gastrointestinal and Endoscopic Surgeons. Representatives from these organizations meet regularly as part of the SCORE Advisory Council.

As of 2019, The American Board of Surgery announced its merger with SCORE, according to the ABS press release.
