= Alexander Petrov (politician) =

Russian politician

Alexander Petrov MP
- Александр Петров
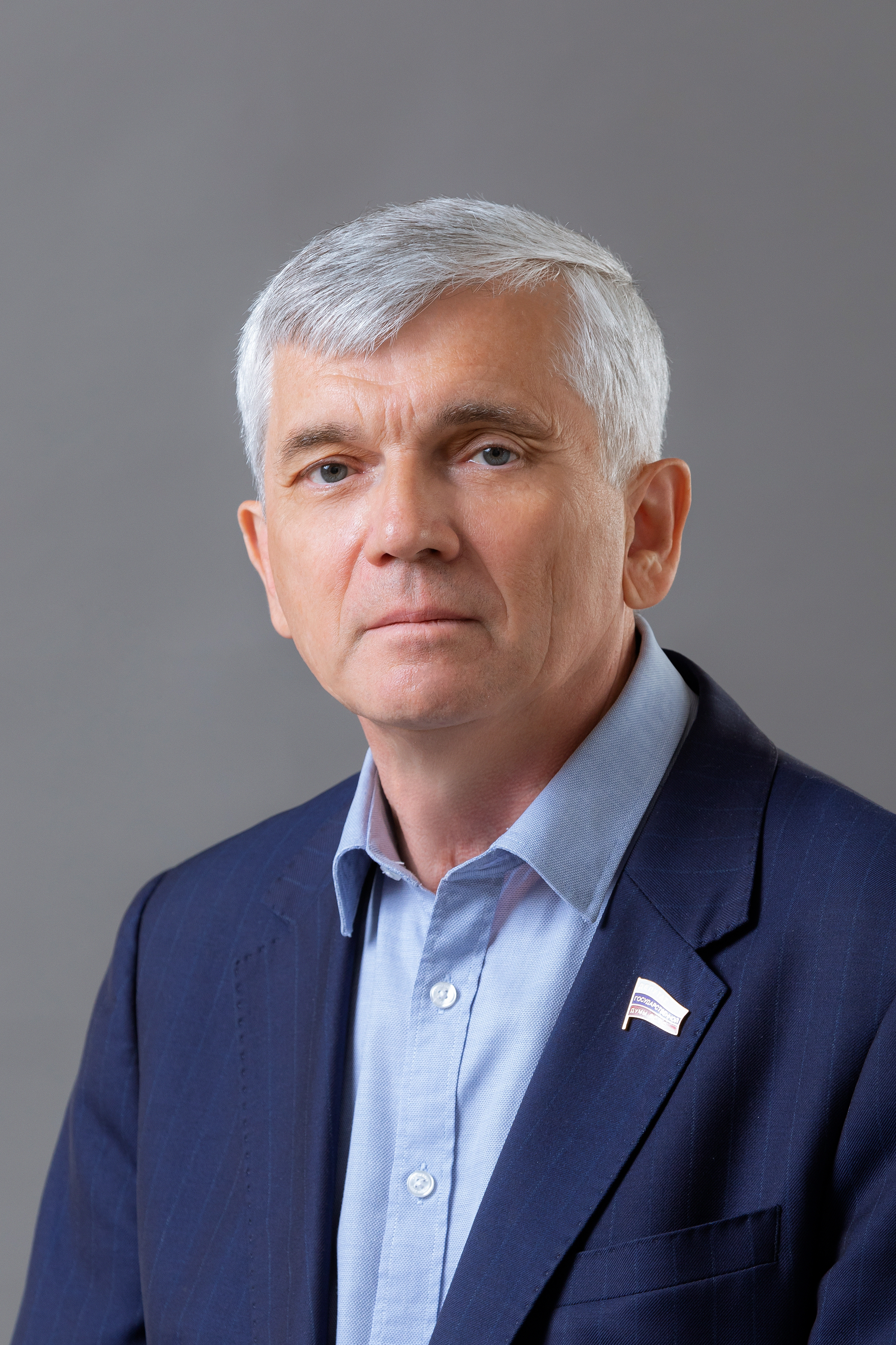

Member of the State Duma for the Jewish Autonomous Oblast
- Incumbent
- Assumed office 12 October 2021
- Preceded by: Anatoly Tikhomirov
- Constituency: Jewish-AO-at-large (No. 220)

Member of the State Duma (Party List Seat)
- In office 24 December 2007 – 12 October 2021

Personal details
- Born: 21 May 1958 (age 68) Plushkari, Yelovsky District, Perm Krai, Russian SFSR, Soviet Union
- Party: United Russia
- Education: Perm State Humanitarian Pedagogical University

Aleksander Petrovich Petrov (Russian: Александр Петрович Петров; born 21 May 1958) is a Russian political figure and a deputy of the 5th, 6th, 7th, and 8th State Dumas. In 2009, he was granted Candidate of Sciences in Economics degree.

After graduating from the university, Petrov worked as a physics teacher and director of an incomplete secondary school in the village of Kalinovka (1979-1984). In 1995, he engaged in the pharmaceutical business in Sverdlovsk Oblast. From 2011 to 2016, he was the deputy of the 6th State Duma from the Sverdlovsk Oblast constituency. In 2016 and 2021, Petrov was re-elected for the 7th, and 8th State Dumas, respectively.

== Awards ==
- Order "For Merit to the Fatherland"
