= Surgery (journal) =

- Discipline: Surgery
- Language: English
- Edited by: Steven D. Wexner, Kevin E. Behrns

Publication details
- History: 1937–present
- Publisher: Elsevier
- Frequency: Monthly
- Open access: Hybrid
- Impact factor: 3.2 (2025)

Standard abbreviations
- ISO 4: Surgery

Indexing
- CODEN: SURGAZ
- ISSN: 0039-6060 (print); 1532-7361 (web)
- OCLC no.: 890353911

Links
- Journal homepage; Online access; Online archive

Surgery is a monthly peer-reviewed medical journal covering surgery. It was established in 1937 and is published by Elsevier. It is sponsored by the Society of University Surgeons, the Central Surgical Association, and the American Association of Endocrine Surgeons. The editors-in-chief are Steven D. Wexner (Cleveland Clinic Florida) and Kevin E. Behrns (Saint Louis University). According to the Journal Citation Reports, the journal has a 2025 impact factor of 3.2.

== Abstracting and indexing ==
The journal is abstracted and indexed in:

- Science Citation Index Expanded (SCIE)
- Scopus
- Index Medicus/MEDLINE/PubMed
