= Okna Tsahan Zam =

- Born: 2 April 1957 (age 68); Kalmyk Autonomous Oblast, Russian SFSR, USSR (now Republic of Kalmykia, Russia)
- Genres: Throat singing
- Occupation: Folk singer
- Years active: 1990-present

Vladimir Okonovich Karuev (born 2 April 1957), better known by his Kalmyk name Okna Tsahan Zam, is a Kalmyk folk singer, known for his throat singing and as a performer of the Kalmyk national epic Jangar.

== Biography ==
Okna Tsahan Zam does not have a traditional music education. According to an interview he gave to Tim Cope, an adventure filmmaker and author, he was educated in Moscow as a nuclear engineer and worked at a nuclear power plant. He turned to Kalmyk culture in his twenties and became a performer of the national epic Jangar. He toured extensively in Mongolia, as well as in Europe.

Okna Tsahan Zam performs in the Khoomei style, a type of Tuvan throat singing, common in Mongolia, Tuva and Siberia. In 2005, he collaborated with Tanya Tagaq, a Canadian Inuk throat singer, and Wimme, a Sami yoiker from Finland, to release the recording Shaman Voices. According to The Concise Garland Encyclopedia of World Music, he "intersperses traditional Mongolian stringed and wind instruments and throat-singing styles with natural steppeland sounds and experiments with urban remixes".

== Awards ==
Okna Tsahan Zam is a recipient of the Mongolian Order of the Polar Star, the highest civilian award Mongolia can present to a foreign citizen.

In 2002, he was awarded the Mongolian Golden Microphone Award for his song Edjin Duun.
