= Patricia L. Turner =

American surgeon and businesswoman

Academic background
- Education: University of Pennsylvania (BA); Wake Forest University (MD); University of Maryland, College Park (MBA)

Academic work
- Discipline: Medicine
- Sub-discipline: General surgery
- Institutions: Northwestern University; University of Chicago

Patricia L. Turner is an American general surgeon. She is the first African American, and first woman to serve as executive director and Chief Executive Officer of the American College of Surgeons. Turner formally assumed the role of executive director and CEO on January 1, 2022.

== Education ==
Turner earned a Bachelor of Arts degree in biology from the University of Pennsylvania and a Doctor of Medicine from the Wake Forest School of Medicine. During medical school, her research in neurobiology and anatomy focused on neuron apoptosis. In May 2023, she was awarded the Distinguished Alumni Award from the Wake Forest University School of Medicine for her contributions to the fields of medicine and surgery.

She continued her training as an intern and resident in surgery at the Howard University Hospital. During residency, Turner spent two years as a senior staff fellow in the National Heart, Lung, and Blood Institute of the National Institutes of Health. Her work there focused on dysregulation of sodium transport in the kidney and nitric oxide's role in the changing abundance of nephron transporter proteins.

Turner's fellowship training in minimally invasive and laparoscopic surgery was completed at the Icahn School of Medicine at Mount Sinai, Weill Cornell Medicine, and Columbia University Irving Medical Center.

Turner earned a Master of Business Administration from the Robert H. Smith School of Business in 2020.

== Career ==
Turner spent eight years in academic practice on the faculty of the University of Maryland School of Medicine where she was the surgery residency program director and medical director of the surgical acute care unit. A former adjunct professor in surgery at the Feinberg School of Medicine, Turner is currently a clinical professor of surgery in the department of surgery at the Pritzker School of Medicine.

In October 2011, Turner was named director of the American College of Surgeons' Division of Member Services. She left this role at the beginning of 2022, after assuming the position of executive director of the organization.

Turner was elected as president of the Society of Black Academic Surgeons (2016 to 2017) and was the first woman to serve in that role.

Turner has served in other leadership positions, including the following: President of the Council on Medical Specialty Societies; chair, American College of Surgeons' Delegation to the American Medical Association's House of Delegates; past-chair, American Medical Association's Council on Medical Education; past-chair, Surgical Section of the National Medical Association; and past president of the surgical section of the National Medical Association. She also serves on the Board of Directors of OceanFirst Bank (OCFC) and the Board of Trustees of Wake Forest University. Wake Forest University Trustees

=== Research ===
Throughout her career, Turner has been involved in both basic science and clinical research. Her work has focused on dysregulation of sodium transport in the kidney and nitric oxide's role in the changing abundance of nephron transporter proteins. Turner's recent research interests are associated with her clinical expertise in laparoscopic surgery, including developing new training paradigms for residents and more senior surgeons.

Turner served on the editorial board of Surgery News, the official newspaper of the American College of Surgeons, from 2005 to 2009, and has been published in several peer-reviewed journals, including The American Surgeon, The American Journal of Surgery, the Journal of the American College of Surgeons, the Journal of Critical Care Medicine, the Journal of Surgical Research, Obesity Surgery, Surgery, and others.

She has recently been widely quoted in op-eds and as a television subject matter expert on surgery, healthcare, the COVID-19 pandemic, cancer and trauma care, and was a guest on C-SPAN in a broad-ranging interview about healthcare in the US. C-SPAN interview.

== Awards ==
Turner is the recipient of the National Institutes of Health Fellows Award for Research Excellence; the Association of Women Surgeons Outstanding Woman Resident Award; the Claude H. Organ, MD, FACS, Traveling Fellowship; the State of Maryland's Henry Welcome Award, and the National Medical Association Council on Concerns of Women Physicians Service Award. She is also a member of Alpha Omega Alpha (AOA), the medical honor society.

In May 2025, Turner was selected by the graduating class of the University of Chicago Pritzker School of Medicine to deliver their Commencement address.<ref<https://www.instagram.com/p/DKNXAHIPGYz/?img_index=2&igsh=YXJmZHMxMHRueGp3 Turner delivers Pritzker Commencement Address</ref>

In October 2025, Turner was admitted to the National Academy of Medicine. “Election to the Academy is considered one of the highest honors in the fields of health and medicine and recognizes individuals who have demonstrated outstanding professional achievement and commitment to service.”
