= American Society of Colon and Rectal Surgeons =

American professional society for colorectal surgeons

The American Society of Colon and Rectal Surgeons (ASCRS), formerly the American Proctologic Society, is a professional society for surgeons specializing in colorectal surgery. It is one of the oldest surgical societies, having been established in 1899.

== History ==
The organization was established as the American Proctologic Society in 1899, at a meeting held in Columbus, Ohio:

The meeting was called by Dr. J. Rawson Pennington of Chicago, Illinois. Dr. James P. Tuttle of New York, New York, was chosen temporary chairman and Joseph M. Mathews of Louisville, Kentucky, elected the first President. The object of the Society as stated in the Constitution is the cultivation and promotion of knowledge in whatever relates to diseases of the rectum and colon.

The name of the organization was changed to American Society of Colon and Rectal Surgeons in 1973 "to indicate more clearly the scope of its specialty".

== Activities ==
The ASCRS has described its activities as follows:

Since its inception in 1899, the American Society of Colon and Rectal Surgeons (ASCRS) has been actively providing support for the education of its members specializing in colon and rectal surgery, general surgeons, surgical residents, and medical students. With new developments in surgical education, the ASCRS continues to offer educational tools and activities tailored to meet acquisition of medical knowledge and technical skills in an ongoing fashion throughout surgeons' careers, foster high-quality patient care, and promote the integration of the core competencies of communication skills, professionalism, system-based practice and practice-based learning, and improvement in daily practice. These tools and activities are presented in this article.

The ASCRS offers continuing medical education courses. For this provision, it is accredited by the Accreditation Council for Continuing Medical Education.

The ASCRS holds an annual conference "to provide participants with in-depth and up-to-date knowledge relative to surgery for diseases of the colon, rectum, and anus", with an emphasis on patient care, teaching, and research. The ASCRS is a participant in the American Joint Committee on Cancer. In 2016, the American College of Surgeons reported on its partnership with the ASCRS in developing technical skill assessments in the colorectal surgery field.

The ASCRS was one of the contributors in the formation of the National Accreditation Program for Rectal Cancer.

== Past Presidents ==
The following list of surgeons have served as President of the ASCRS:

Year	Name
2022	Conor P. Delaney
2021	Thomas E. Read
2020	Neil H. Hyman
2019	Tracy L. Hull
2018	David A. Margolin
2017	Guy R. Orangio
2016	Patricia L. Roberts
2015	Charles E. Littlejohn
2014	Terry C. Hicks
2013	Michael J. Stamos
2012	Alan G. Thorson
2011	Steven D. Wexner
2010	David Beck
2009	James W. Fleshman
2008	Anthony Senagore
2007	W. Douglas Wong
2006	Lester Rosen
2005	Ann C. Lowry
2004	Bruce G. Wolff
2003	David J.Schoetz, Jr.
2002	Richard P. Billingham
2001	Robert D. Fry
2000	John M. MacKeigan
1999	H. Randolph Bailey
1998	Lee E. Smith
1997	Ira J. Kodner
1996	David A. Rothenberger
1995	Victor W. Fazio
1994	Philip H. Gordon
1993	Samuel B. Labow
1992	W. Patrick Mazier
1991	Robert W. Beart, Jr.
1990	Peter A. Volpe
1989	J. Byron Gathright, Jr.
1988	Herand Abcarian
1987	Frank J. Theuerkauf
1986	H. Whitney Boggs, Jr.
1985	Eugene P. Salvati
1984	A.W. Martin Marino, Jr.
1983	Stanley M. Goldberg
1982	Eugene S. Sullivan
1981	Bertram A. Portin
1980	Malcolm C. Veidenheimer
1979	Stuart H.Q. Quan
1978	Donald M. Gallagher
1977	Alejandro F. Castro
1976	John R. Hill
1975	Patrick H. Hanley
1974	Rupert B. Turnball
1973	John H. Remington
1972	John E. Ray
1971	Andrew Jack McAdams
1970	Walter Birnbaum
1969	James A. Ferguson
1968	Neil W. Swinton
1967	Raymond J. Jackman
1966	Maus W. Stearns, Jr.
1965	Norman D. Nigro
1964	Garnet W. Ault
1963	Robert A. Scarborough
1962	Robert J. Rowe
1961	Merrill O. Hines
1960	Walter A. Fansler
1959	Hyrum R. Reichman
1958	Karl Zimmerman
1957	Julius E. Linn
1956	Rufus C. Alley
1955	Stuart T. Ross
1954	A.W. Martin Marino, Sr.
1953	W. Wendell Green
1952	Newton D. Smith
1951	Robert A. Scarborough
1950	Hoyt R. Allen
1949	Louis E. Moon
1948	Harry E. Bacon
1947	George H. Thiele
1946	Joseph W. Ricketts
1944, 1945	William H. Daniel
1942, 1943	Homer I. Silvers
1941	Frederick B. Campbell
1940	Clement J. De Bere
1939	Martin S. Kleckner
1938	Dudley Smith
1937	Harry Z. Hibshman
1936	Marion C. Pruitt
1935	Frank G. Runyeon
1934	Louis A. Buie
1933	Curtis C. Mechling
1932	Curtice Rosser
1931	W. Oakley Hermance
1930	Dudley Smith
1929	Walter A. Fansler
1928	Edward G. Martin
1927	Louis A. Buie
1926	William H. Kiger
1925	Descum C. McKenney
1924	Frank C. Yeomans
1923	Ralph W. Jackson
1922	Emmett H. Terrell
1921	Granville S. Hanes
1920	Alois B. Graham
1919	Collier F. Martin
1917, 1918	Jerome M. Lynch
1916	Alfred J. Zobel
1915	T. Chittenden Hill
1914	Louis J. Krause
1913	Joseph M. Mathews
1912	Louis J. Hirschman
1911	John L. Jelks
1910	George J. Cook
1909	Dwight H. Murray
1908	George B. Evans
1907	A. Bennett Cooke
1906	Samuel G. Gant
1905	Lewis H. Adler, Jr.
1904	J. Rawson Pennington
1903	William M. Beach
1902	Samuel T. Earle
1901	Thomas C. Martin
1900	James P. Tuttle
1899	Joseph M. Mathews
