= Jewish constituency =

Russian legislative constituency

Jewish single-member constituency
- Constituency of the Russian State Duma

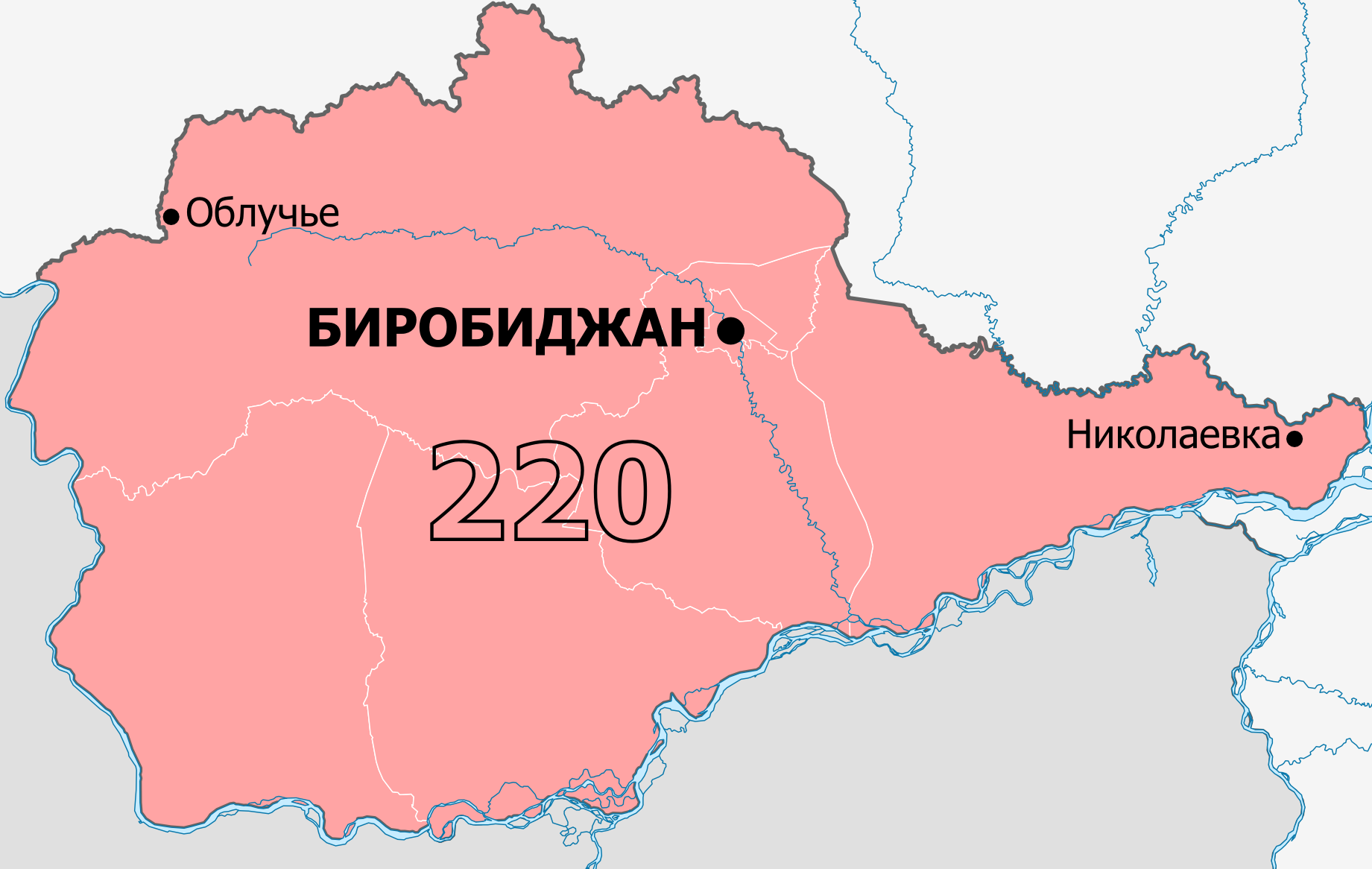
- Deputy: Badma Bashankayev; United Russia
- Federal subject: Jewish Autonomous Oblast
- Districts: Birobidzhan, Birobidzhansky, Leninsky, Obluchensky, Oktyabrsky, Smidovichsky
- Voters: 112,657 (2026)

The Jewish constituency (No.220 (Note: Birobidzhansky constituency No.214 in 1993-2007)) is a Russian legislative constituency in the Jewish Autonomous Oblast. The constituency encompasses the entire territory of the Jewish Autonomous Oblast.

The constituency has been represented since 2026 by United Russia deputy Badma Bashankayev, two-term State Duma member and colorectal surgeon, who won the open seat, succeeding three-term United Russia incumbent Alexander Petrov.

== Boundaries ==
1993–2007, 2016–present: Birobidzhan, Birobidzhansky District, Leninsky District, Obluchensky District, Oktyabrsky District, Smidovichsky District
The constituency has been covering the entirety of the Jewish Autonomous Oblast since its initial creation in 1993.

== Members elected ==
Election	Member	Party
1993	Anatoly Biryukov	Independent
1995	Sergey Shtogrin	Communist Party
1999	Sergey Shtogrin	Communist Party
2003	Sergey Shtogrin	Communist Party
2007	Proportional representation - no election by constituency	
2011	Proportional representation - no election by constituency	
2016	Anatoly Tikhomirov	United Russia
2021	Alexander Petrov	United Russia
2026	Badma Bashankayev	United Russia

== Election results ==
=== 1993 ===
Summary of the 12 December 1993 Russian legislative election in the Birobidzhan constituency
Candidate	Party	Votes	%
Anatoly Biryukov	Independent	18,695	26.55%
Vladimir Ulanov	Independent	15,365	21.82%
Dmitry (Motya) Weiserman	Choice of Russia	13,080	18.57%
against all		17,997	25.55%
Total		70,426	100%

=== 1995 ===
Summary of the 17 December 1995 Russian legislative election in the Birobidzhan constituency
Candidate	Party	Votes	%
Sergey Shtogrin	Communist Party	20,216	22.71%
Maria Zhirdetskaya	Independent	17,979	20.19%
Alla Gerber	Independent	12,398	13.92%
Georgy Gulyayev	Pamfilova–Gurov–Lysenko	6,677	7.50%
Anatoly Biryukov (incumbent)	Agrarian Party	6,409	7.20%
Anatoly Beskhmelnitsyn	Independent	6,038	6.78%
Miron Fishbein	Congress of Russian Communities	1,833	2.06%
Anatoly Gorelik	Social Democrats	1,148	1.29%
against all		15,147	17.01%
Total		89,035	100%

=== 1999 ===
Summary of the 19 December 1999 Russian legislative election in the Birobidzhan constituency
Candidate	Party	Votes	%
Sergey Shtogrin (incumbent)	Independent	38,739	48.46%
Anatoly Tikhomirov	Our Home – Russia	11,456	14.33%
Konstantin Ashurov	Independent	10,204	12.77%
Valentina Bychkova	Independent	6,204	7.76%
against all		11,901	14.89%
Total		79,932	100%

=== 2003 ===
Summary of the 7 December 2003 Russian legislative election in the Birobidzhan constituency
Candidate	Party	Votes	%
Sergey Shtogrin (incumbent)	Communist Party	37,203	48.11%
Andrey Vinogradov	United Russia	19,241	24.88%
Artur Amelin	Liberal Democratic Party	4,298	5.56%
Aleksey Khomchenko	Yabloko	3,722	4.81%
Anatoly Maksimov	Independent	2,646	3.42%
Yevgeny Shimanovich	Independent	1,229	1.59%
against all		7,778	10.06%
Total		77,393	100%

=== 2016 ===
Summary of the 18 September 2016 Russian legislative election in the Jewish constituency
Candidate	Party	Votes	%
Anatoly Tikhomirov	United Russia	21,783	41.50%
Konstantin Lazarev	Communist Party	10,384	19.79%
Galina Timchenko	Liberal Democratic Party	8,041	15.32%
Ivan Prokhodtsev	Independent	3,688	7.03%
Vladimir Dudin	A Just Russia	2,699	5.14%
Konstantin Larionov	Communists of Russia	1,952	3.72%
Vasily Dmitriyenko	Yabloko	988	1.88%
Total		52,483	100%

=== 2021 ===
Summary of the 17-19 September 2021 Russian legislative election in the Jewish constituency
Candidate	Party	Votes	%
Alexander Petrov	United Russia	41,421	53.19%
Konstantin Lazarev	Communist Party	14,256	18.31%
Vasily Gladkikh	Liberal Democratic Party	5,727	7.35%
Vladimir Dudin	A Just Russia — For Truth	4,052	5.20%
Tatyana Fain	Party of Pensioners	3,310	4.25%
Marina Smirnova	Communists of Russia	3,127	4.02%
Grigory Zinich	Rodina	2,069	2.66%
Total		77,872	100%

=== 2026 ===
Summary of the 18-20 September 2026 Russian legislative election in the Jewish constituency
Candidate	Party	Votes	%
Badma Bashankayev	United Russia	35,443	55.57%
Yevgeny Konopatkin	Communist Party	9,574	15.01%
Tatyana Slutskaya	Liberal Democratic Party	5,831	9.14%
Ivan Prokhodtsev	New People	3,558	5.58%
Natalya Polodyuk	A Just Russia	2,686	4.21%
Olga Kholova	Communists of Russia	1,883	2.95%
Svetlana Kulikova	Party of Pensioners	1,758	2.76%
Dmitry Tarasov	Rodina	1,209	1.90%
Total		63,776	100%
