= Priyutnoye, Republic of Kalmykia =

Settlement in Priyutnensky District, Kalmykia, Russia

Coordinates: 46°06′01″N 43°30′29″E

Priyutnoye (Russian: Прию́тное Prijutnoe; Kalmyk: Әмтә Нур, Ämtä Nur) is a settlement and the administrative center of Priyutnensky District and Iki-Burulsky rural locality of the Republic of Kalmykia in the Russia. It is located on the R216 highway, 58 kilometres (36 mi) southwest of the Kalmyk capital of Elista near the Nain Shara River, a tributary of the Manych River. In 2021, its population was 5,182 souls.

An 1848 imperial decree to create settled villages in ethnically Kalmyk areas led to the 1850 founding of a settlement of Russians near the lake of Amtya-Nur (Амтя-Нур, from the Kalmyk Әмтә Нур Ämtä Nur, lit. "sweet lake"). Noted scientist Karl Ernst von Baer visited the area in 1856 and tried unsuccessfully to convince the inhabitants to move from the area due to lime concentrations in the lake.
