= Priyutnensky District =

Priyutnensky District Приютненский район (Russian)
- District

Other transcription(s)
  - Kalmyk: Приютнин район
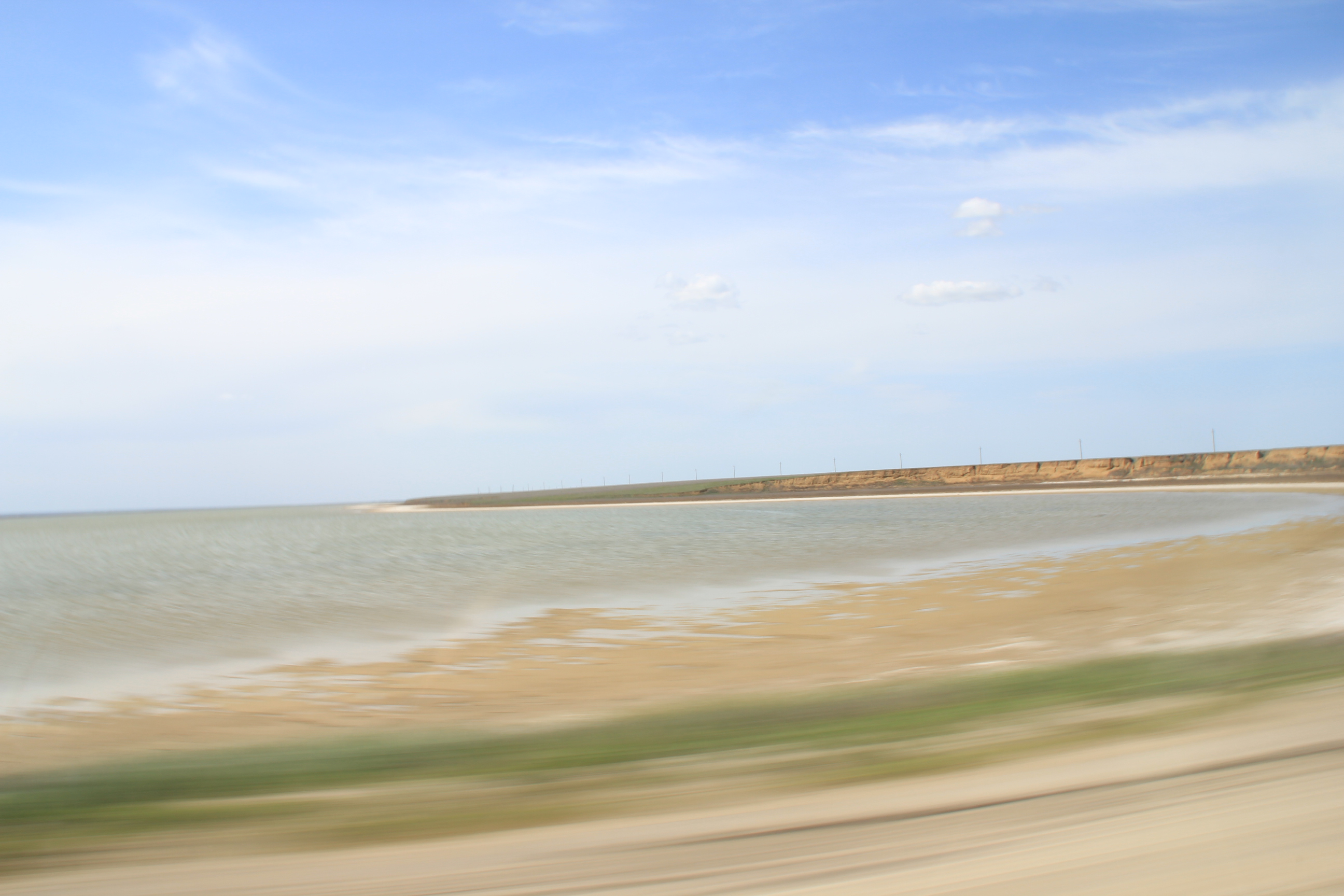
- Lake Manych-Gudilo, a protected area of Russia, is partially located in Priyutnensky District
- Location of Priyutnensky District in the Republic of Kalmykia
- Coordinates: 46°06′N 43°30′E
- Country: Russia
- Federal subject: Republic of Kalmykia
- Established: 1938
- Administrative center: Priyutnoye

Area
  - Total: 3,110.00 km^{2} (1,200.78 sq mi)

Population (2010 Census)
  - Total: 11,658
  - Density: 3.7486/km^{2} (9.7087/sq mi)
  - Urban: 0%
  - Rural: 100%

Administrative structure
  - Administrative divisions: 8 Rural administrations
  - Inhabited localities: 22 rural localities

Municipal structure
  - Municipally incorporated as: Priyutnensky Municipal District
  - Municipal divisions: 0 urban settlements, 8 rural settlements
- Time zone: UTC+3 (MSK)
- OKTMO ID: 85628000
- Website: http://priutnoe.rk08.ru

Population of Priyutnensky District
- 2010 Census: 11,658
- 2002 Census: 12,004
- 1989 Census: 15,847
- 1979 Census: 14,766

Priyutnensky District (Russian: Прию́тненский райо́н; Kalmyk: Приютнин район, Priyutnin rayon) is an administrative and municipal district (raion), one of the thirteen in the Republic of Kalmykia, Russia. It is located in the west of the republic. The area of the district is 3,110.00 square kilometers (1,200.78 sq mi). Its administrative center is the rural locality (a selo) of Priyutnoye. As of the 2010 Census, the total population of the district was 11,658, with the population of Priyutnoye accounting for 51.6% of that number.

== History ==
The district was established in 1938.

== Administrative and municipal status ==
Within the framework of administrative divisions, Priyutnensky District is one of the thirteen in the Republic of Kalmykia. The district is divided into eight rural administrations which comprise twenty-two rural localities. As a municipal division, the district is incorporated as Priyutnensky Municipal District. Its eight rural administrations are incorporated as eight rural settlements within the municipal district. The selo of Priyutnoye serves as the administrative center of both the administrative and municipal district.
