= American College of Surgeons =

Educational association of surgeons

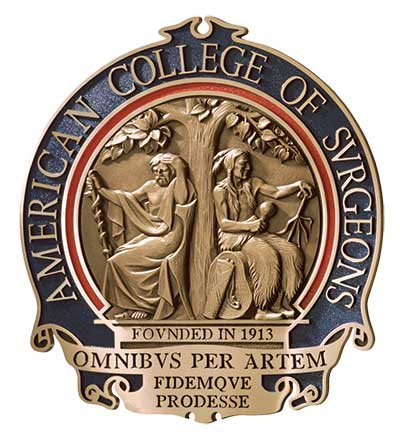
- Abbreviation: ACS
- Formation: 1913; 113 years ago
- Type: Professional association
- Headquarters: Chicago, Illinois, U.S.
- Location: United States
- Members: 95,000 (2026)
- Official language: English
- President, Board of Regents: E. Christopher Ellison, MD, FACS
- Chair, Board of Regents: Timothy J. Eberlein, MD, FACS
- Executive Director: Patricia L. Turner
- Website: www.facs.org

The American College of Surgeons (ACS) is a professional medical association for surgeons and surgical team members, founded in 1913. It reports a membership of 95,000 in 144 countries.

== History ==
The ACS was founded in 1913 as an outgrowth of the Clinical Congress of Surgeons of North America that had existed since 1910 as an outgrowth of the journal Surgery, Gynecology and Obstetrics, an initiative of ACS founder Franklin H. Martin.

== Leadership ==
The college is governed by a Board of Regents, a Board of Governors, and a variety of local ACS Chapters. The Board of Regents formulates policy and directs the affairs of the college. The Board of Governors acts as the liaison between the Board of Regents and the Fellows. The local ACS Chapters exert the college's influence at the community level.

Patricia L. Turner began serving as the executive director and chief executive officer of the college in January 2022. Turner is the first African American and the first woman to serve in this position. She is currently on the faculty in the department of surgery at the University of Chicago Medicine.

== Fellow of the American College of Surgeons ==
Fellow of the American College of Surgeons (or FACS) is a professional certification for a medical professional who has passed a set of criteria for education, qualification, and ethics required to join the ACS.

FACS is used as a post-nominal title, such as John Citizen, MD, FACS.

== See also ==
- American College of Physicians
- List of trauma centers in the United States
- Surgical Council on Resident Education
