= Mekor Baruch =

Neighborhood of Jerusalem, Israel

Coordinates: 31°47′19.07″N 35°12′38.32″E

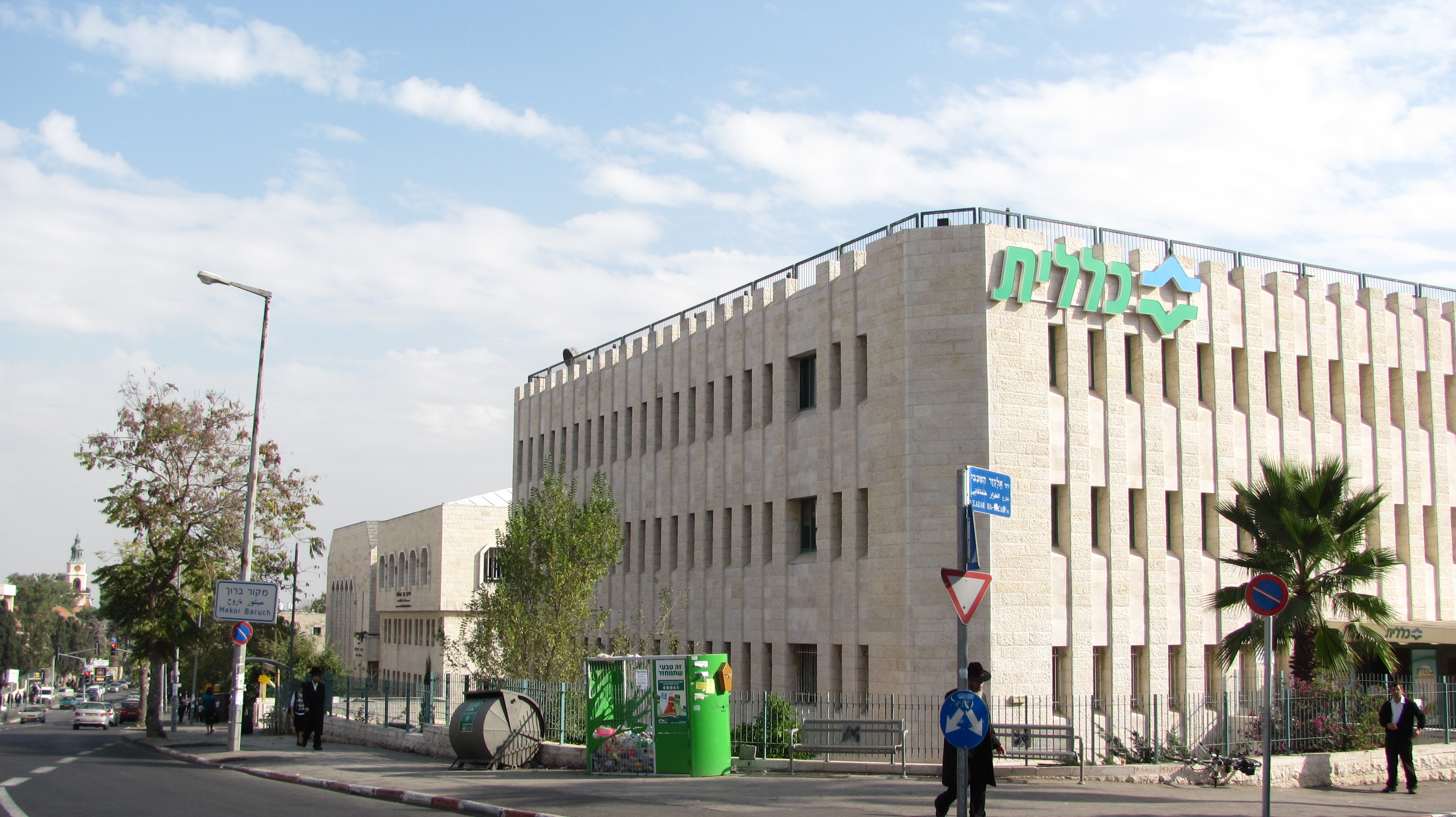
Clalit Health Clinic (right) in Mekor Baruch. The bell tower of Schneller Orphanage can be seen at far left.

Mekor Baruch (Hebrew: מקור ברוך, lit., "blessed source" or "fountain of blessing") also spelled Makor Baruch, is a neighborhood in Jerusalem. The neighborhood is bordered by Malkhei Yisrael Street to the north, Sarei Yisrael Street to the west, Jaffa Road to the south, and the Zikhron Moshe neighborhood to the east.

== History ==
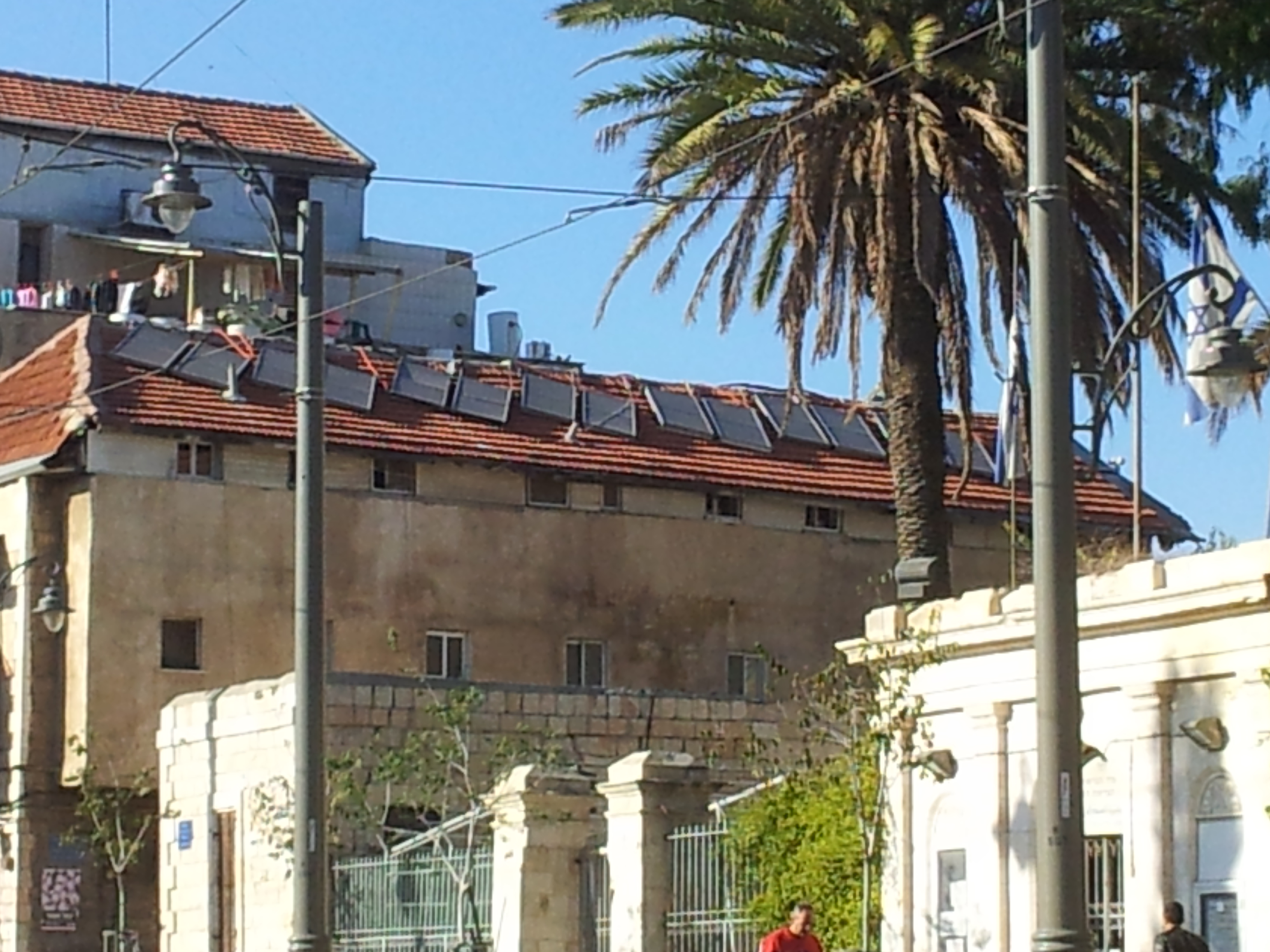
Street in Mekor Baruch

Mekor Baruch was founded in 1924 on land purchased from the Schneller Orphanage by the Jerusalem-American Land Company, a consortium of Jerusalem and American investors. The name of the neighborhood was based on the words Yehi mekorkha baruch ("Let your fountain be blessed") in Proverbs 5:18. Differing sources place the beneficiary of the name as Boris (Baruch) Hershenov, one of the investors, or Baruch Aharanoff, an American philanthropist. The consortium mapped out 207 lots, but due to the economic downturn of 1927–1930, construction did not get underway until the 1930s, by which time the consortium had been liquidated.

To the southeast lay an adjacent neighborhood called Ruchama, founded in 1921 and named after Hosea 2:3. This neighborhood was absorbed into Mekor Baruch after 1948.

== Geography ==
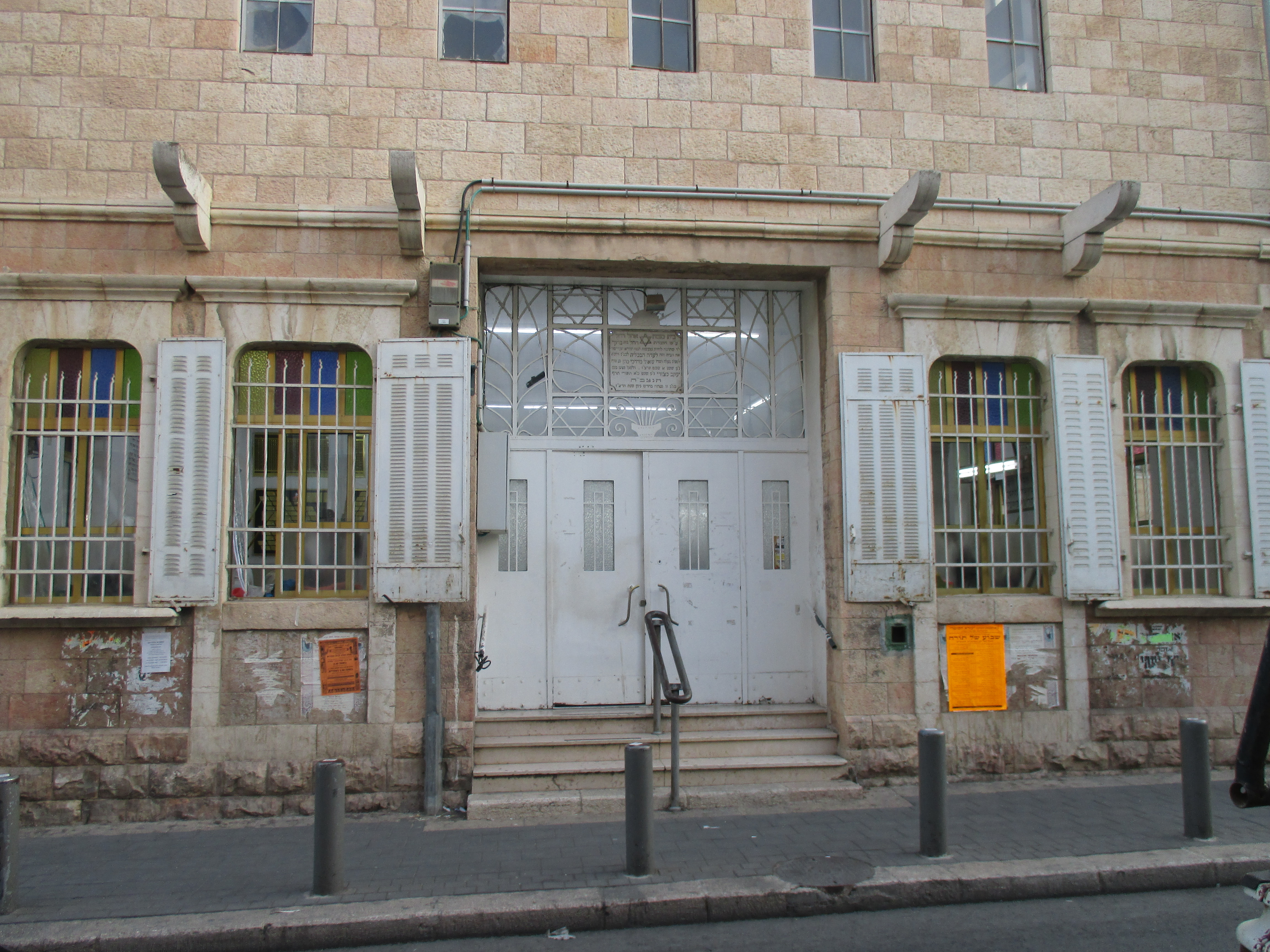
The Ohel Rahel synagogue on David Yellin Street.

Mekor Baruch is located 810 metres (2,660 ft) above sea level. The area lies at the head of the Ben-Hinnom Valley, a 3.1 kilometres (1.9 mi)-long valley that winds down Jaffa Road to Independence Park and Mamilla Pool until it intersects with the Kidron Valley.

The main street of the neighborhood is Rashi Street. In the northwest quadrant, a group of streets are named after heroes of the Hanukkah story, Yehuda Hamaccabee, Shimon Hamaccabee, and Elazar Hamaccabee; these streets intersect HaHashmonaim (The Hasmoneans) Street.

== Demographics ==
Before 1948, Mekor Baruch was considered upscale and was home to Eastern European Labor Party members and Holocaust survivors. In a 1938 census, the population was recorded at 2,500. After the 1948 Arab-Israeli War, large numbers of Jewish refugees from Eastern lands moved into the area and the buildings became rundown. In the 1960s, Haredi Jews began to move into the neighborhood. Today the neighborhood is Haredi, with a mix of Ashkenazi and Sephardi residents.

In a 2010 real estate report, Mekor Baruch logged a 26 percent increase in home prices, the largest increase in the city, with sales of three-room apartments averaging US $384,000 (NIS 1.5 million). The increase was said to be influenced by the influx of "social centers" to the neighborhood.

== Health care ==
The neighborhood houses clinics for three out of the four Israeli health maintenance organizations: Clalit, Meuhedet, and Leumit. The Clalit clinic is part of the Mekor Baruch Health Clinic, a three-story medical center that includes an emergency room and operating theaters. The Meuhedet clinic on Haturim Street occupies one of Meuhedet's main offices in Jerusalem.

== Industrial zone ==
Mekor Baruch is the site of an aging yet active industrial zone bordered by Yehuda Hamaccabee Street, Rashi Street, and Gesher Hachaim Street. Built in the 1950s by the Jerusalem Economic Corporation, the multi-story complex is home to about 40 companies engaged in light industry, including manufacturers of diamonds, pencils, and Judaica, the MA’AS Rehabilitation Center and Sheltered Workshop, and printing establishments, including the Hebrew language Hamodia daily newspaper.

== Education ==
=== Yeshivas ===
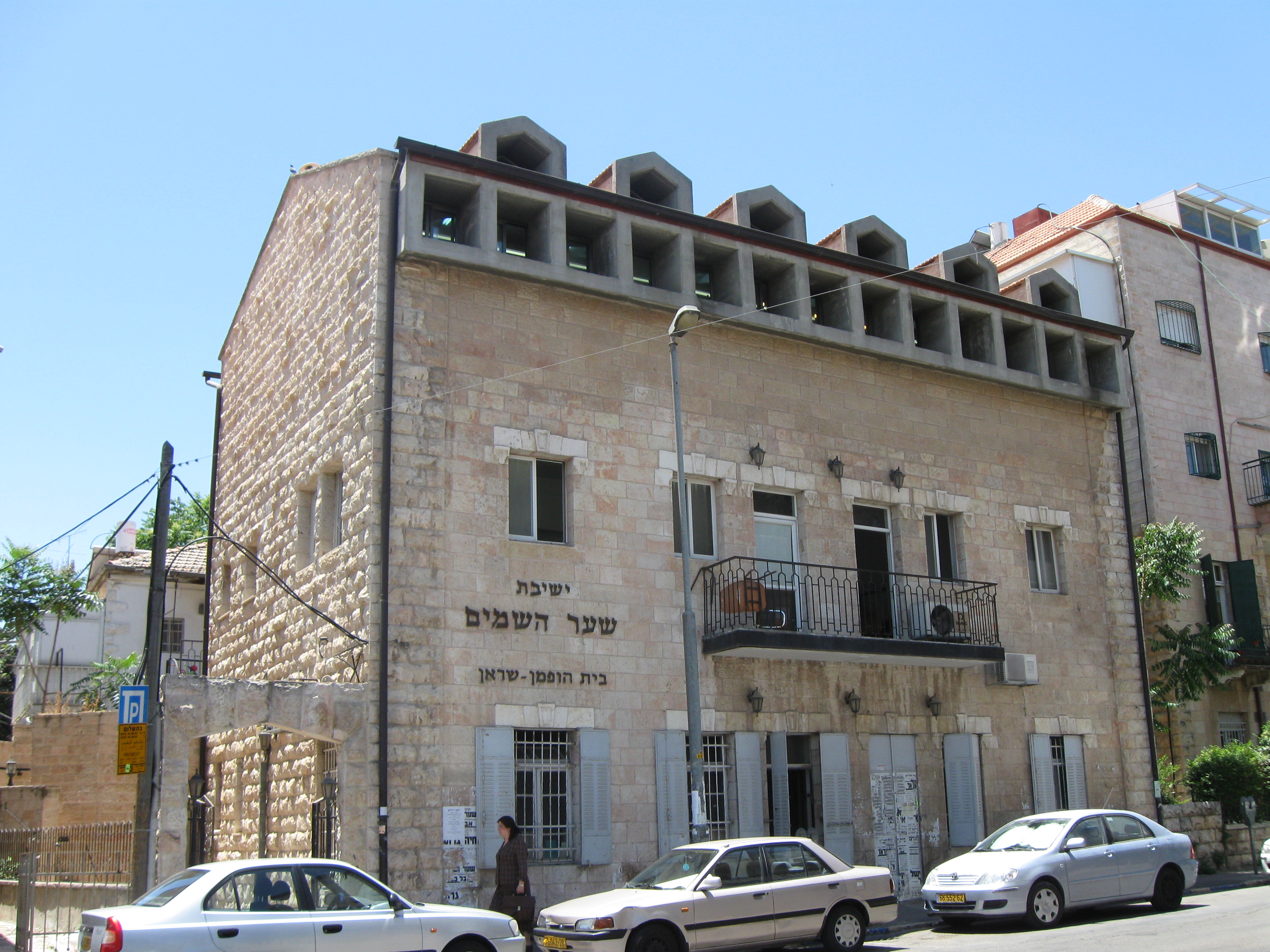
Shaar Hashamayim Yeshiva on Rashi Street.

- Hashalom Yeshiva
- Hazon Yeshaya Institutions - Yeshiva and Kollel
- Ohr Shmuel Yeshiva
- Rinat HaTorah Yeshiva
- Sfas Emes Yeshiva, founded in 1925, with an adjacent ohel containing the graves of the Imrei Emes and Pnei Menachem
- Shaar Hashamayim Yeshiva, a Kabbalah yeshiva founded in 1906 and currently headed by Rabbi Gamliel Rabinowitz
- Yakirei Yisrael Yeshiva
- Ruzhin Yeshiva, combined with the main synagogue of chassidut Boyan.
- Ateret Shlomo Yeshiva
- Yeshivat haMekubalim and the Beit El Synagogue on Rashi Street

=== Schools ===
- Bais Yaakov Seminary
- Mesoras Rachel Seminary
- Talmud Torah Hamesorah, formerly the Zionist Tachkemoni School founded here in 1929

== Landmarks ==
- IDF Jerusalem Recruiting Center
- Prima Palace Hotel (formerly Central Hotel)
- Hazon Yeshaya Humanitarian Network - food support, dental care, vocational training, now managed by Carmei Ha’Ir.
- Miklat l’Omanut art studio and gallery

== Notable residents ==
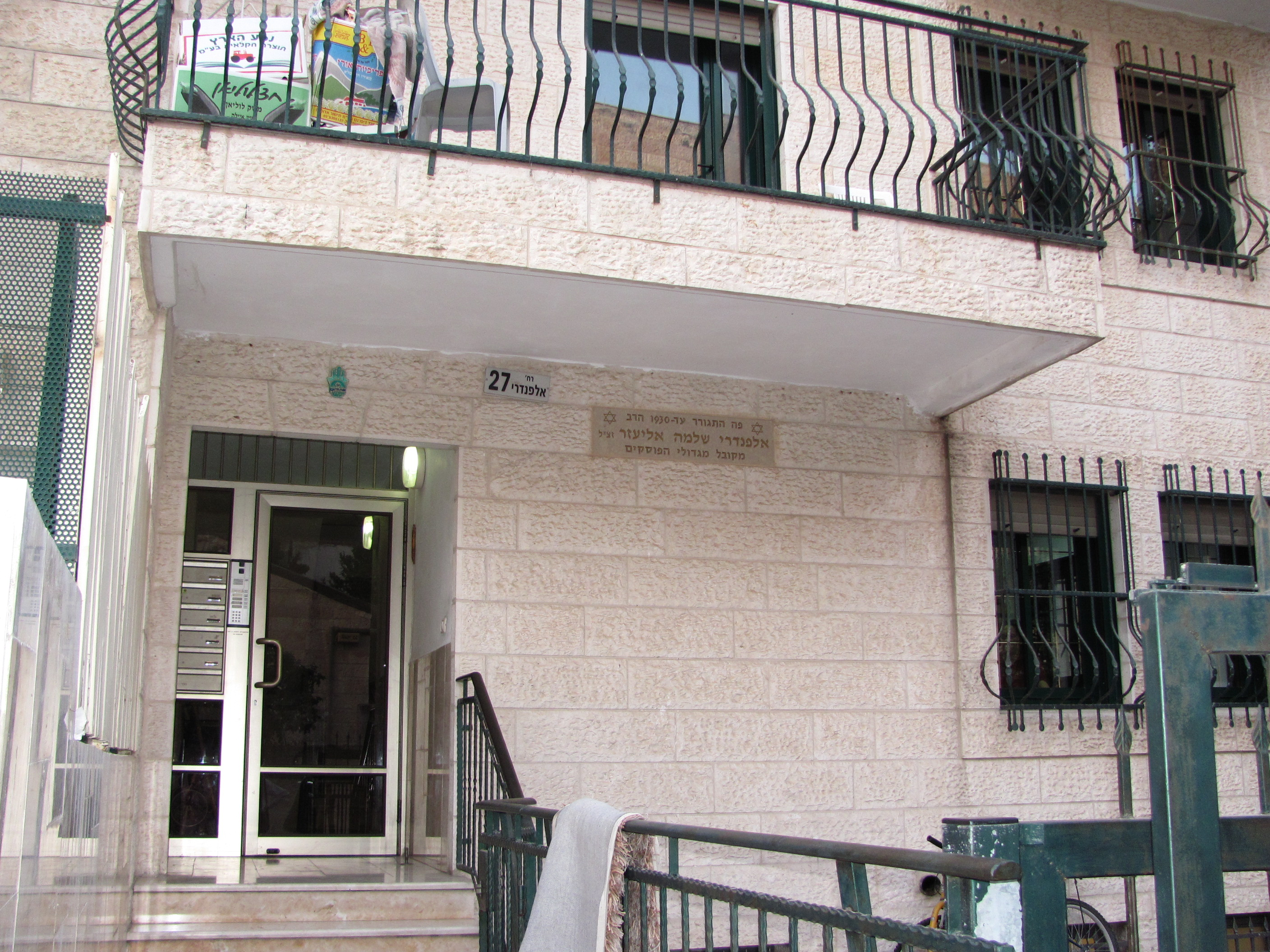
A plaque on a new apartment building marks the site where Rabbi Solomon Eliezer Alfandari lived until 1930.

- Solomon Eliezer Alfandari, former Chief Rabbi of Damascus. The street on which he lived his last years is named after him
- Nachum Dov Brayer, the Boyaner Rebbe
- Amos Oz
- Yitzhak Navon

== Cultural references ==
Much of the action in Amos Oz's novel My Michael takes place in Mekor Baruch.
