= Esther Jungreis =

Holocaust survivor, author and a religious public speaker

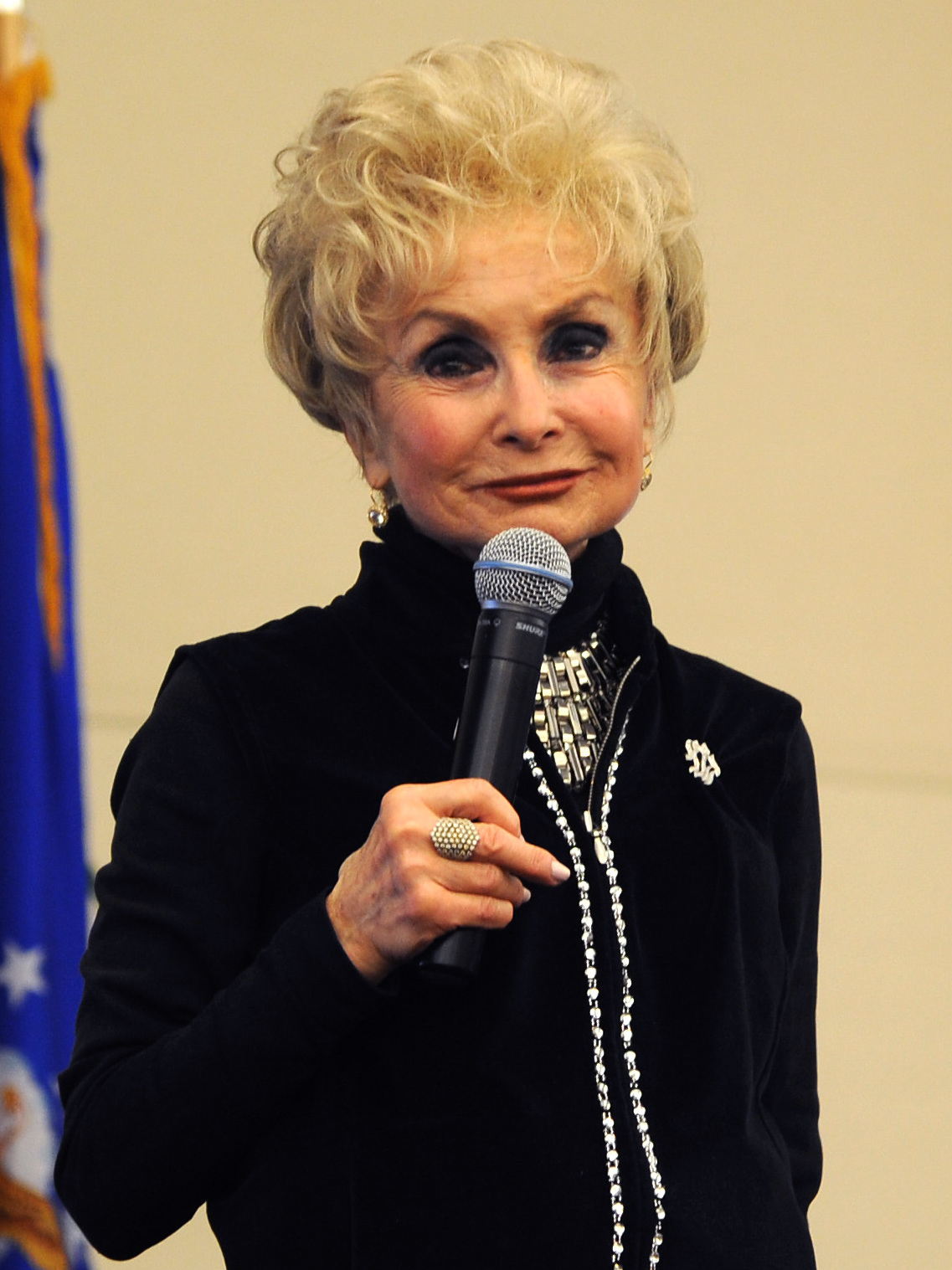
- Jungreis lecturing in 1974 Jungreis at Scott Air Force Base during the 2012 National Prayer Breakfast
- Born: April 27, 1936; Szeged, Hungary
- Died: August 23, 2016 (aged 80); Lawrence, New York, U.S.
- Occupations: Author, Public Speaker and Kiruv

Esther Jungreis (April 27, 1936 – August 23, 2016, 19 Menachem Av, 5776) was a Jewish, Hungarian-born, American author and public speaker. She founded the international Hineni organization in the United States. A Holocaust survivor and rebbetzin, she worked to bring secular Jews to Orthodox Judaism.

== Biography ==
Jungreis was born in Szeged, Hungary on April 27, 1936, to Avraham and Miriam Jungreis. The couple had no other daughters; their two sons became rabbis. Her father was an Orthodox rabbi and operated a shtiebel in the city, in the Neolog (Reform) community.

At age seven, Esther Jungreis and her family were deported with other Szeged Jews in a cattle car bound for Auschwitz. However, a relative who worked for Rudolph Kastner's office arranged for the cattle car to be opened while passing through Budapest and the entire Jungreis family was transferred onto the so-called Kastner train. The train was on its way to Switzerland when it was diverted to the Bergen-Belsen concentration camp in Germany. The Jungreis family was imprisoned there for six months - she was prisoner number 5357. In December 1944 they were released and traveled with 1,368 other passengers to a refugee camp in Caux, Switzerland.

In 1947, the family moved to Brooklyn, New York, where they later reconnected with a distant cousin, Rabbi Theodore (Meshulem HaLevi) Jungreis. Esther and Theodore married in 1955. The couple settled in North Woodmere, New York, and founded the North Woodmere Jewish Center/Orthodox Congregation Ohr Torah. Together they raised four children.

Jungreis founded the Hineni organization on November 18, 1973, in Madison Square Garden's Felt Forum. The organization aimed to promote Yiddishkeit in the United States. As the leader of this organization, she drew criticism for her outspoken stance against interfaith marriages. She was also critical of secularization, which she viewed as a form of assimilation.

After her husband died in 1996, Jungreis continued with outreach and education. The Yartzeit of her husband was in Shevat, 5756. Along with Paysach Krohn, Jungreis served as a guest speaker at the annual Shavuot retreat hosted by The Gateways Organization.

Jungreis died on August 23, 2016, aged 80, due to complications of pneumonia. She was survived by four children — Yisroel Jungreis and Osher Jungreis, both rabbis, and Chaya Sara Gertzulin and Slava Chana Wolff. At the time of her death, she resided in Lawrence.

== Outreach work ==
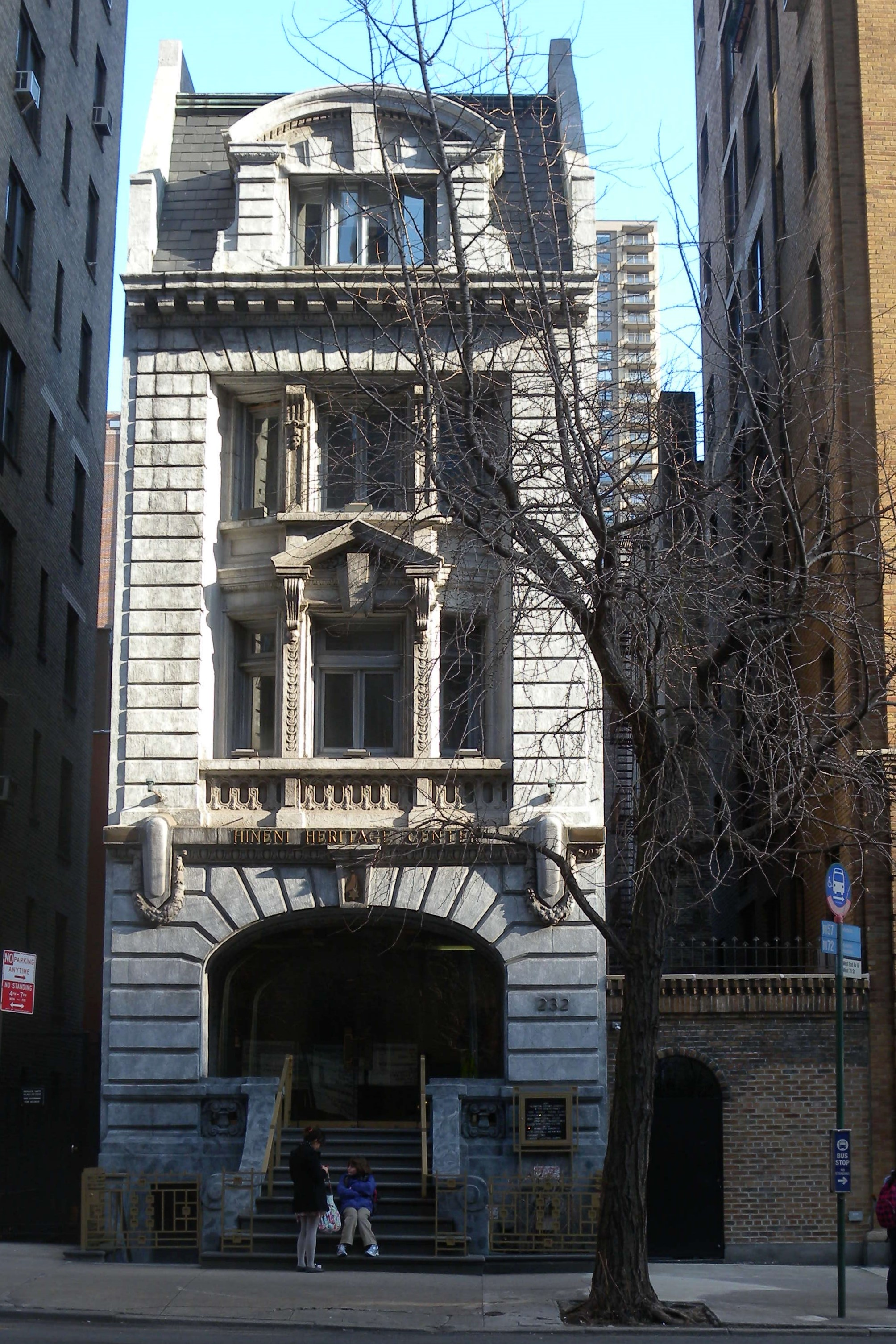
Hineni Heritage Center

=== Hineni ===
Hineni (Hebrew: הִנֵּֽנִי, lit. 'here I am' [hiˈneni]) is an organization founded in May 1973 by Jungreis to encourage Jews to transition to Orthodox Judaism, a part of the movement known as Ba'al Teshuva. Jungreis addressed audiences throughout the 1970s and 80s, including an early program titled "You Are a Jew" at Madison Square Garden on November 18, 1973. She spoke against trends of secularization and assimilation that she considered to be "spiritual genocide".

The word 'Hineni' means 'Here I am' in a spiritual sense, a reference to what Abraham says to God to indicate his readiness in Genesis 22:1. The name chosen by Jungreis contrasts with the Hebrew word "Poe", which means present (as in attendance-taking).

In 1989, the Hineni Heritage Center opened in New York City. The Center houses a multi-media museum and offers classes in Torah studies, Shabbatons (weekends) and High Holy Days services. The Heneni Bill and Jill Roberts Outreach Center in Jerusalem offers guidance and counseling to youths at risk.

Jungreis spoke at the Hollywood Palladium, the Johannesburg Coliseum, and Binyanei HaUmah in Jerusalem. She also spoke to the United States Army and Navy and the Israel Defense Forces. In 1998, Hineni opened a soup kitchen and youth center in Jerusalem, offering social and support services for young people at risk, in addition to hosting an annual Passover seder for the city's homeless residents.

== Writings ==
Jungreis wrote five books: Jewish Soul on Fire (William Morrow & Company), The Committed Life: Principles of Good Living from Our Timeless Past (HarperCollins, translated into Hebrew, Russian and Hungarian and in its eighth edition), The Committed Marriage (HarperCollins), Life Is a Test (ArtScroll) and her last book, Be A Blessing (ArtScroll) which was published posthumously in 2022.

For over 40 years, she wrote a column for The Jewish Press using the Torah as the source for solutions to everyday problems.

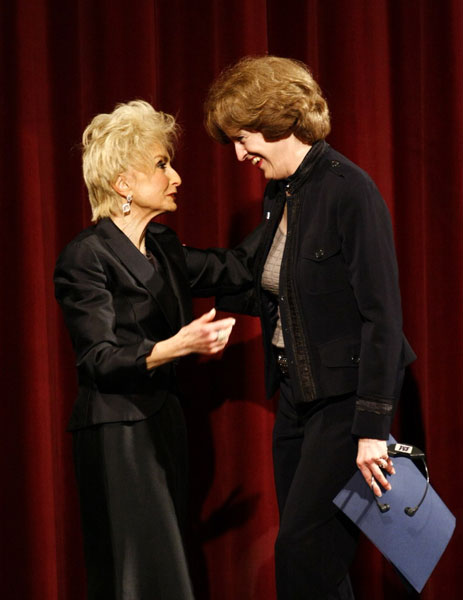
Esther Jungreis (left) with April Foley, U.S. Ambassador to Hungary. Budapest, September 15, 2008.

== Awards and recognition ==
Jungreis was named "Woman of the Year" by Hadassah, Jewish War Veterans, B'nai B'rith, Federation of Jewish Women's Organizations, the Knights of Pythias, and the Christian Amita Society.

U.S. President George W. Bush appointed Jungreis to serve on the honorary delegation that accompanied him to Jerusalem for the celebration of the 60th anniversary of the State of Israel in May 2008.

The Ani Yehudi award was accepted posthumously by her daughter, Slovie Jungreis Wolff, on October 21, 2016.

== See also ==
- Orthodox Judaism outreach
- Baal teshuva
