= Mosad Keren Hatzole =

Mosad Keren Hatzole is a charity fund founded by the Satmar Rebbe, Grand Rabbi Joel Teitelbaum, in 1979.

Its purpose is to raise money to support educational institutions in the Land of Israel that, being ideologically opposed to the State of Israel, do not accept funding from the Israeli government.

On Monday, 23 June 2008, a large festive rally of hundreds of children between the ages of 10 and 12 took place in the Jerusalem neighborhood of Ezras Torah to celebrate the 30th anniversary of Keren Hatzole. The rally was attended by tens of important rabbis, including the Edah HaChareidis Chief Rabbi of Jerusalem, Rabbi Yitzchok Tuvia Weiss, and the Head of the Edah HaChareidis Rabbinical Courts, Rabbi Moishe Sternbuch.

The current president of Keren Hatzole is Great Rabbi Leibish Leiser, Rebbe of Pshevorsk, from Antwerp, Belgium. The rabbinical council of Keren Hatzole in Jerusalem consists of the members of the great beis din (Badatz) of the Edah HaChareidis: Rabbi Yaakov Blau, Rabbi Meir Brandsdorfer, Rabbi Avrohom Yitzchok Ulman, Rabbi Yehoshua Rosenberger, Rabbi Naftoli Hertzke Frenkel, Yaakov Mendel Yurovitch. Other members of the Keren Hatzole leadership in Jerusalem include Rabbi Yaakov Meir Shechter and Rabbi Dovid Eichler.

== Sources ==
- HaEdah, Parashas Korach 5768 (edition 1448), p6-11
- HaEdah, Parashas Beshalach, Shvat 5768 (edition 1426)
- HaEdah, Parashas Tetzaveh, Adar A' 5768 (edition 1430), p14
