= Yechiel Fishel Eisenbach =

Rabbo Yechiel Fishel Eisenbach יחיאל פישל אייזנבך
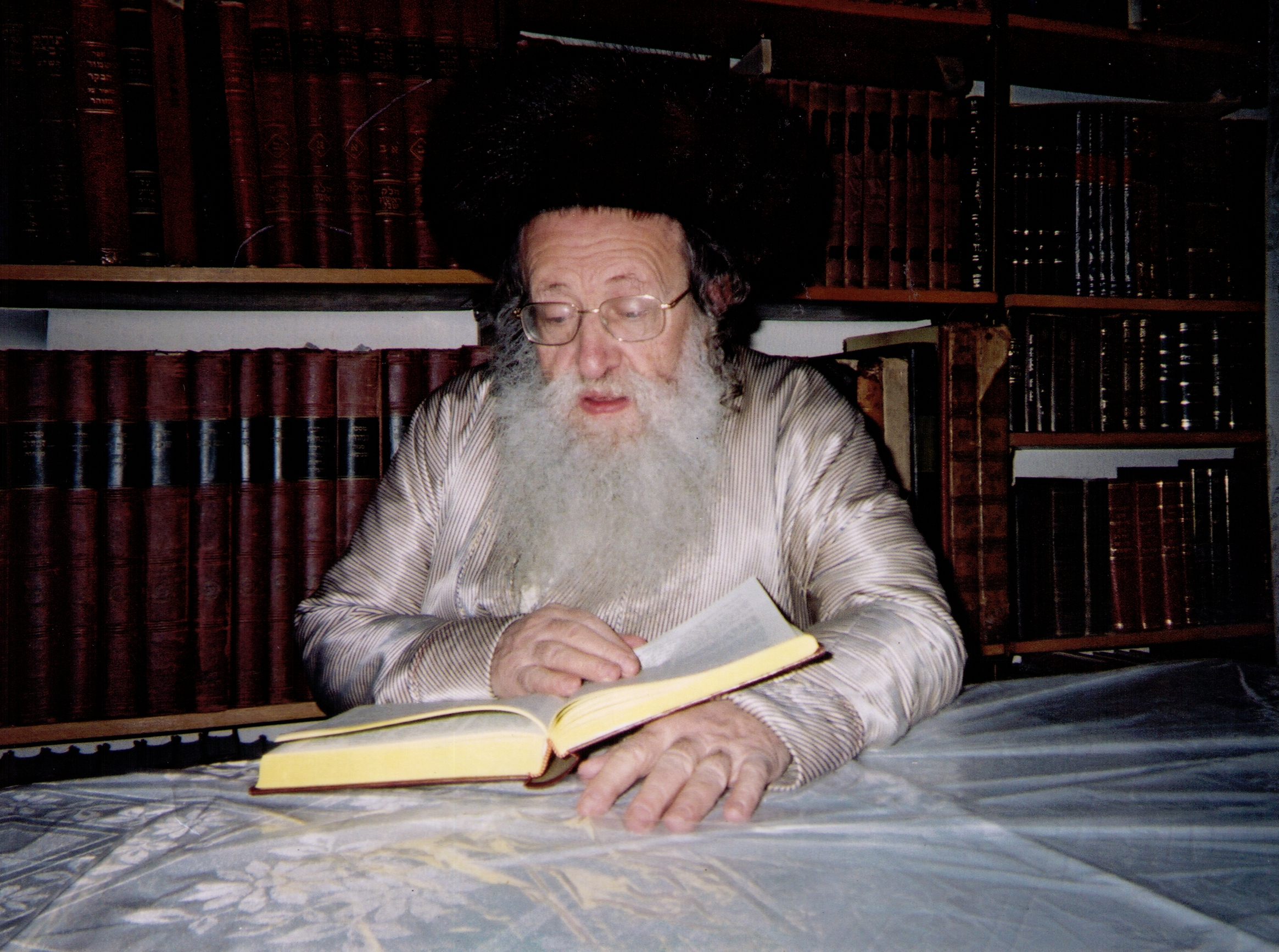

Personal life
- Born: Yechiel Fishel Eisenbach; 1925 Jerusalem
- Died: 4 September 2008 (aged 82–83) Jerusalem
- Buried: Mount of Olives
- Children: Yaakov Tzvi; Yechezkel; 3 daughters
- Parent: Rabbi Yosef Eisenbach

Religious life
- Religion: Judaism
- Denomination: Haredi
- Yeshiva: Shaar Hashamayim Yeshiva
- Position: Rosh yeshiva
- Began: 1973
- Ended: 2008
- Residence: Jerusalem

Yechiel Fishel Eisenbach (Hebrew: יחיאל פישל אייזנבך; 1925 – 4 September 2008) was a Haredi rabbi and long-time rosh yeshiva of Shaar Hashamayim Yeshiva in Jerusalem. He was widely regarded as one of the greatest kabbalists in Israel, and was an expert in the writings of the Arizal and the siddur of the Rashash.

== Early life ==
He was born in Jerusalem to Rabbi Yosef Eisenbach, a sofer (scribe), and studied in the Talmud Torah and yeshiva of Shomrei HaChomot. He was also one of the first students of Yeshivat Beit Avraham-Slonim, which was then led by Rabbi Sholom Noach Berezovsky, the Rebbe of Slonim.

After his marriage in 1944 to the daughter of Rabbi Asher Zelig Margolios, a noted kabbalist, Rabbi Eisenbach studied at the Pressburg Yeshiva under Rabbi Akiva Sofer (the Daas Sofer); the Toras Emes (Chabad) yeshiva; and Kollel Shomrei HaChomot. He was well known for his 18-hour day of learning, as well as his humility. Occasionally he gave shiurim (lectures) on Torah and fear of God to unmarried students. At different times, he served as mashgiach ruchani for the Slonim Yeshiva, and as maggid shiur (lecturer) for an elite group of students at Toras Emes.

== Rosh yeshiva ==
In 1973, Rabbi Refoel Dovid Auerbach of Shaar Hashamayim Yeshiva asked Rabbi Eisenbach to assume the mantle of rosh yeshiva after the passing of Rabbi Aharon Slotkin. Rabbi Eisenbach's proficiency in kabbalah was well known. He knew all the writings of the Arizal and the siddur of the Rashash by heart, and was an expert in davening with the kavannot (mystical intentions) of these kabbalistic masters. Over the next 35 years, he taught thousands of students of kabbalah at the yeshiva, as well as began a new study of the kavannot of the Rashash.

== Illness and death ==
His health progressively worsened in the two years before his death at the age of 83. Hespedim (eulogies) were delivered at his yeshiva by Rabbi Gamliel Rabinowitz, a fellow rosh yeshiva of Shaar Hashamayim Yeshiva; Rabbi Shmuel Auerbach, yeshiva president; Rabbi Reuven Gross; Rabbi Yaakov Hillel; and Rabbi Eisenbach's son-in-law, Rabbi Moshe Uri Eisenstein, a rabbi from the Givat Shaul neighborhood of Jerusalem. He was buried on the Mount of Olives.

Rabbi Eisenbach is survived by two sons, Rabbi Yaakov Tzvi Eisenbach and Rabbi Yechezkel Eisenbach, and three sons-in-law: Rabbi Moshe Uri Eisenstein (Rav of the Givat Shaul neighborhood of Jerusalem, Rabbi Tovia Miller, and Rabbi Chanina Karpman, along with grandchildren and great-grandchildren.
