= Paysach Krohn =

American Orthodox Jewish rabbi and author (born 1945)

Paysach J. Krohn
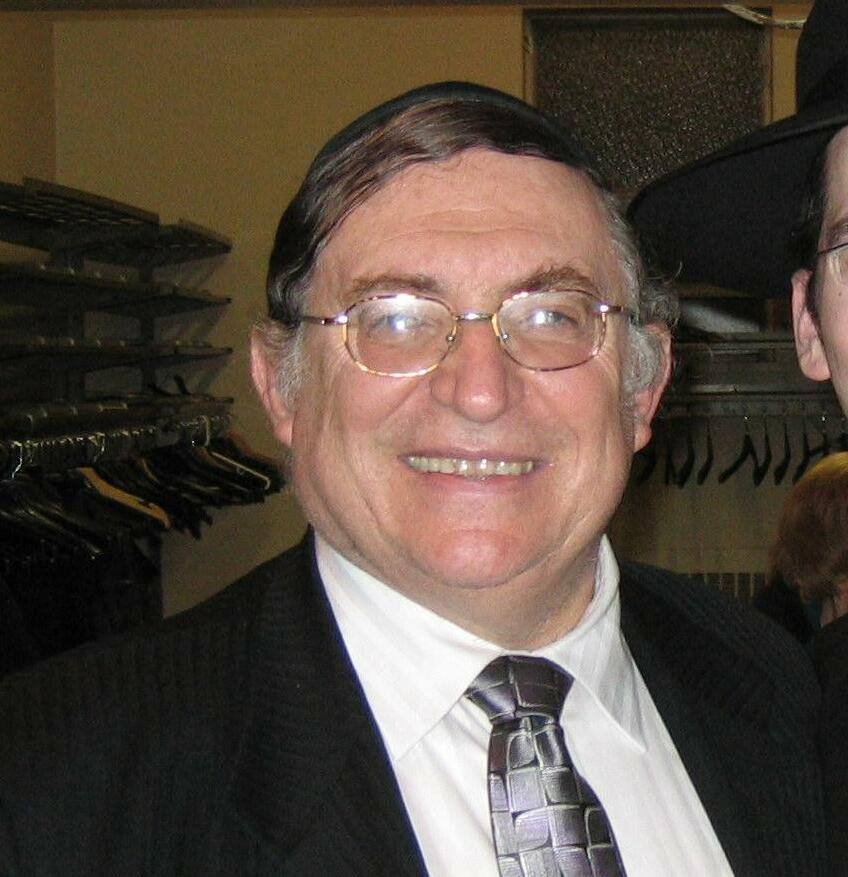
- Rabbi Paysach Krohn, c. December 2007.
- Born: Paysach J. Krohn; January 29, 1945 (age 81); Williamsburg, Brooklyn
- Website: rabbipaysachkrohn.com

Paysach J. Krohn (born January 29, 1945) is an American Orthodox Jewish rabbi, mohel (a practitioner of Jewish ritual circumcision), author, and public speaker. He is the author of Maggid series of books, which are inspired by the stories of Rabbi Sholom Schwadron and published by Mesorah Publications. He has lectured on topics including personal growth, moral development, and Jewish values.

== Early life ==
Krohn was born in Williamsburg, Brooklyn and moved at age 7 with his family to Kew Gardens, Queens. His father, Avrohom Zelig Krohn, was a mohel; after his father fell ill, Paysach trained under him. At age 21, he became the youngest mohel certified by the Brith Milah Board of New York.

== Relationship with Rav Sholom Schwadron ==
Krohn authored a series of books called "Maggid", inspired by the stories of Rabbi Sholom Schwadron, known as the "Maggid of Jerusalem." Schwadron delivered mussar talks every Friday night from 1952 to 1992 to the public at the shtiebel of Zikhron Moshe in Jerusalem. Krohn met Schwadron when his father invited Schwadron to stay with them during one of his frequent fundraising trips to the United States in late 1964. Schwadron insisted on paying rent, to which Krohn agreed reluctantly. In the five months Schwadron resided with the Krohns, a close bond formed between him and the family. When Schwadron announced he was leaving after Passover 1965 to travel back to Israel by boat, the Krohn family saw him off at the pier. Krohn's father then handed Schwadron an envelope containing all the "rent money" he had paid, stating that he had never intended to keep it. A few days later, Krohn's parents arranged passports, flew to Israel two days before Schwadron arrived, and greeted him.

Avrohom Zelig Krohn was diagnosed with a terminal illness after this event and died the following year. Six months later, the family received a letter from Schwadron saying that he was coming to America again. Schwadron became a surrogate father to Avrohom Zelig Krohn's seven orphaned children.

With Schwadron's encouragement and input, Paysach Krohn penned the first of his "Maggid" books, The Maggid Speaks, published in 1987. Schwadron died before the second book in the series, Around the Maggid's Table, was published. Subsequent titles (Along the Maggid's Journey, In the Footsteps of the Maggid, Echoes of the Maggid, Reflections of the Maggid, etc.) memorialized Schwadron's influence on the overall project. As of 2012, Krohn had published eight books in the series.

== Mohel ==
Krohn is a fifth-generation mohel. He has performed thousands of circumcisions and has been affiliated with hospitals such as Long Island Jewish Medical Center and North Shore University Hospital.

== Other activities ==
Krohn lectures in various Jewish communities, giving presentations as a maggid and collecting stories for his speeches and books. He also leads Jewish historical tours in Europe, discussing the history of Jewish communities before World War II. He documented the first of these trips in his 2007 book, Traveling with the Maggid.

Along with Esther Jungreis, Krohn has served as a guest speaker at the annual Shavuot retreat hosted by Gateways since 2005.

In December 2004, he initiated the organization PaL (Phone and Learn) in the United Kingdom, which connects individuals interested in Jewish learning with tutors for weekly study sessions over the phone.

== Personal ==
Krohn is married to Miriam, who is a principal at a high school in Queens, New York. On December 6, 2024, he suffered a stroke during a convention and is undergoing physical therapy.

== Works ==
- Bris Milah. Mesorah Publications, Ltd. 1985. ISBN 9780899061986.
- The Maggid Speaks: Favorite Stories and Parables of Rabbi Sholom Schwadron, Shlita, Maggid of Jerusalem. Mesorah Publications, Ltd. 1987. ISBN 089906230X.
- Around the Maggid's Table: More Classic Stories and Parables from the Great Teachers of Israel. Mesorah Publications, Ltd. 1989. ISBN 0899065627.
- Yad Eliezer: A Collection of Various Halachos, Mitzvos, and Minhagim Pertinent to Left-Handers. Self-published, December 1990.
- In the Footsteps of the Maggid: Inspirational Stories and Parables about Eminent People of Yesterday and Today. Mesorah Publications, Ltd. 1992. ISBN 0899065961.
- Along the Maggid's Journey: A Collection of All New Inspirational Stories and Parables from Around the World and Across the Generations. Mesorah Publications, Ltd. 1995. ISBN 0899063233.
- Echoes of the Maggid: Heartwarming Stories and Parables of Wisdom and Inspiration. Mesorah Publications, Ltd. 1999. ISBN 1578192617.
- Reflections of the Maggid: inspirational stories from around the globe and around the corner. Mesorah Publications, Ltd. 2002. ISBN 1578197511.
- Traveling With the Maggid: A journey to great Torah centers of yesteryear. Mesorah Publications Ltd. 2007. ISBN 978-1422602294.
- In the Spirit of the Maggid: Inspirational Stories that Touch the Heart and Stir the Spirit. Mesorah Publications, Ltd. 2008. ISBN 978-1422608722.
- Perspectives of the Maggid: Insights and Inspiration from the lectures of Rabbi Paysach Krohn. Mesorah Publications, Ltd. 2012. ISBN 978-1422611845.

== Audio lectures ==
- MP3 shiurim by Rabbi Paysach Krohn
- Interview with Rabbi Paysach Krohn by Chazaq's Rabbi Yaniv Meirov
