= North Woodmere Park =

Park in North Woodmere, Nassau County, New York, United States

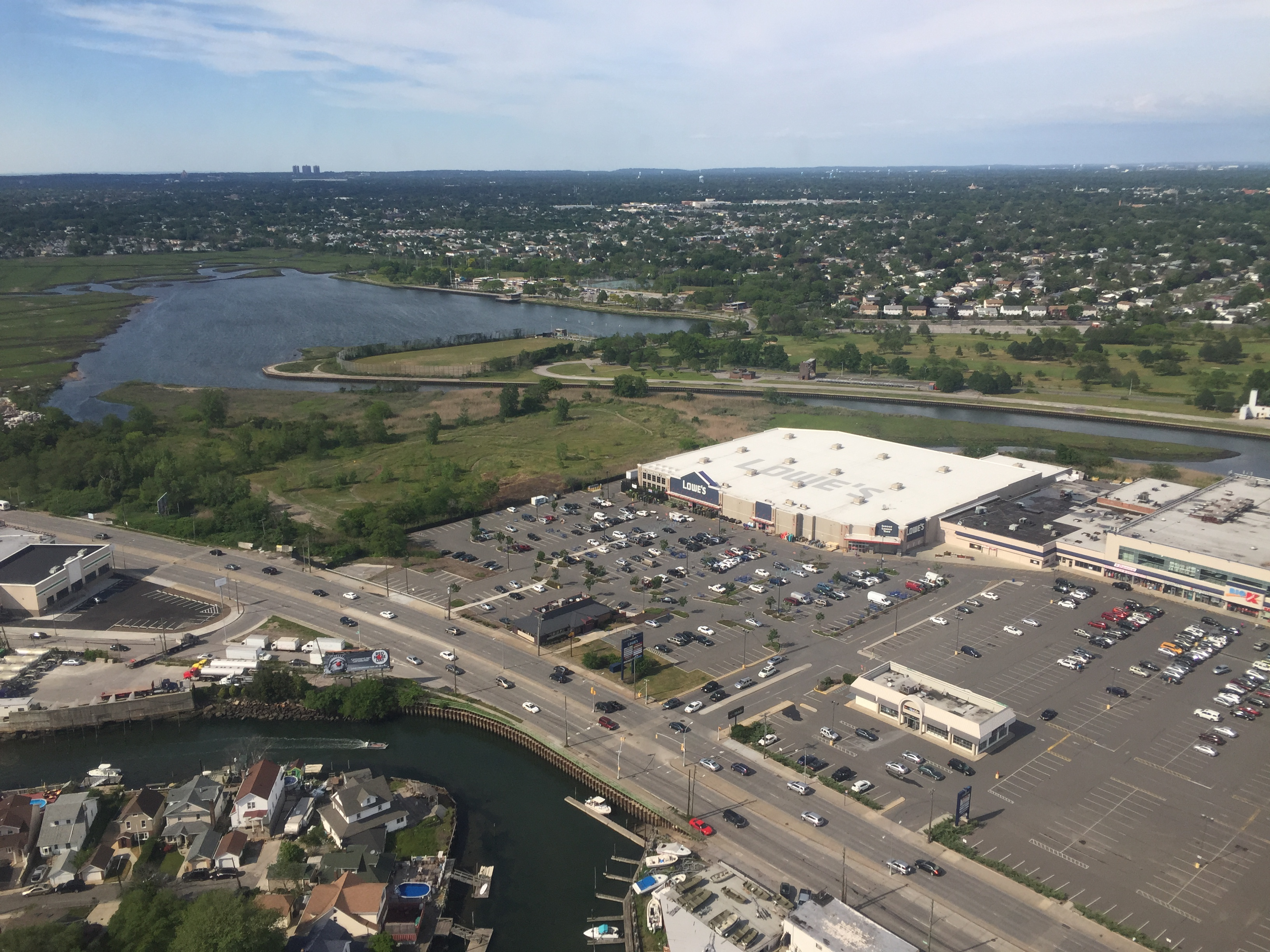
- North Woodmere Park, seen from a plane landing at Kennedy Airport
- Interactive map of North Woodmere Park
- Type: Public
- Location: North Woodmere, New York
- Coordinates: 40°38′37″N 73°44′10″W
- Area: 150 acres (61 ha)
- Established: 1965
- Owner: County of Nassau
- Operator: Nassau County Department of Parks, Recreation and Museums
- Website: www.nassaucountyny.gov/2803/North-Woodmere-Park

North Woodmere Park is a major, 150-acre (61 ha) park located at the intersection of Branch Boulevard and Hungry Harbor Road within North Woodmere, in Nassau County, New York, United States. It is owned and operated by Nassau County.

== Description ==
North Woodmere Park consists of a nine-hole golf course, an outdoor swimming pool complex, sporting facilities, a playground, picnic areas, seating areas, and fishing facilities. It is located along Hook Creek, and is a popular spot for watching aircraft on final approach to land at nearby John F. Kennedy International Airport.

== History ==
In 1962, voters approved the County of Nassau purchasing approximately 27 acres (11 ha) of land and approximately 45 acres (18 ha) of water for the development of a new county-owned park in North Woodmere.

North Woodmere County Park opened in 1965. The opening that year was marked by a ribbon-cutting ceremony led by then-Nassau County Executive Ralph G. Caso.

== See also ==
- Bay Park (Bay Park, New York)
