= Avraham Zagdun =

Leader of a Jewish messianic cult

Avraham Haim Zagdun
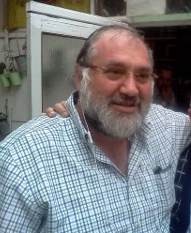
- Zagdun in 2013
- Born: 1957 (age 68–69); Tunisia
- Occupation: Cult leader
- Known for: Claiming to be the messiah

Avraham Haim Zagdun (Hebrew: אַבְרָהָם חַיִּים זַגְדּוֹן) is the leader of a Jewish messianic cult. He has described himself as the Messiah and the spiritual heir of Nachman of Breslov.

== Biography ==
Zagdun was born in Tunisia in 1957 as חיים אובר זגדון and immigrated to France with his family as part of the broader wave of North African Jewish emigrations. He grew up in an affluent environment; his family was well-established. In France, his father managed multiple businesses and owned hundreds of properties.

From a young age, Zagdun believed he possessed supernatural powers. As he recounted:

I lacked nothing in France, but from the age of three I sensed a profound depth within me. I never blindly accepted what others told me and always felt that I possessed extraordinary powers. I even remember foreseeing the First Intifada before it happened.

— Avraham Haim Zagdun

In 1987, upon the birth of their first daughter, Zagdun and his wife decided to immigrate to Israel with their daughter. As of 2015, he was married and had six children.

== The cult of Avraham Zagdun ==
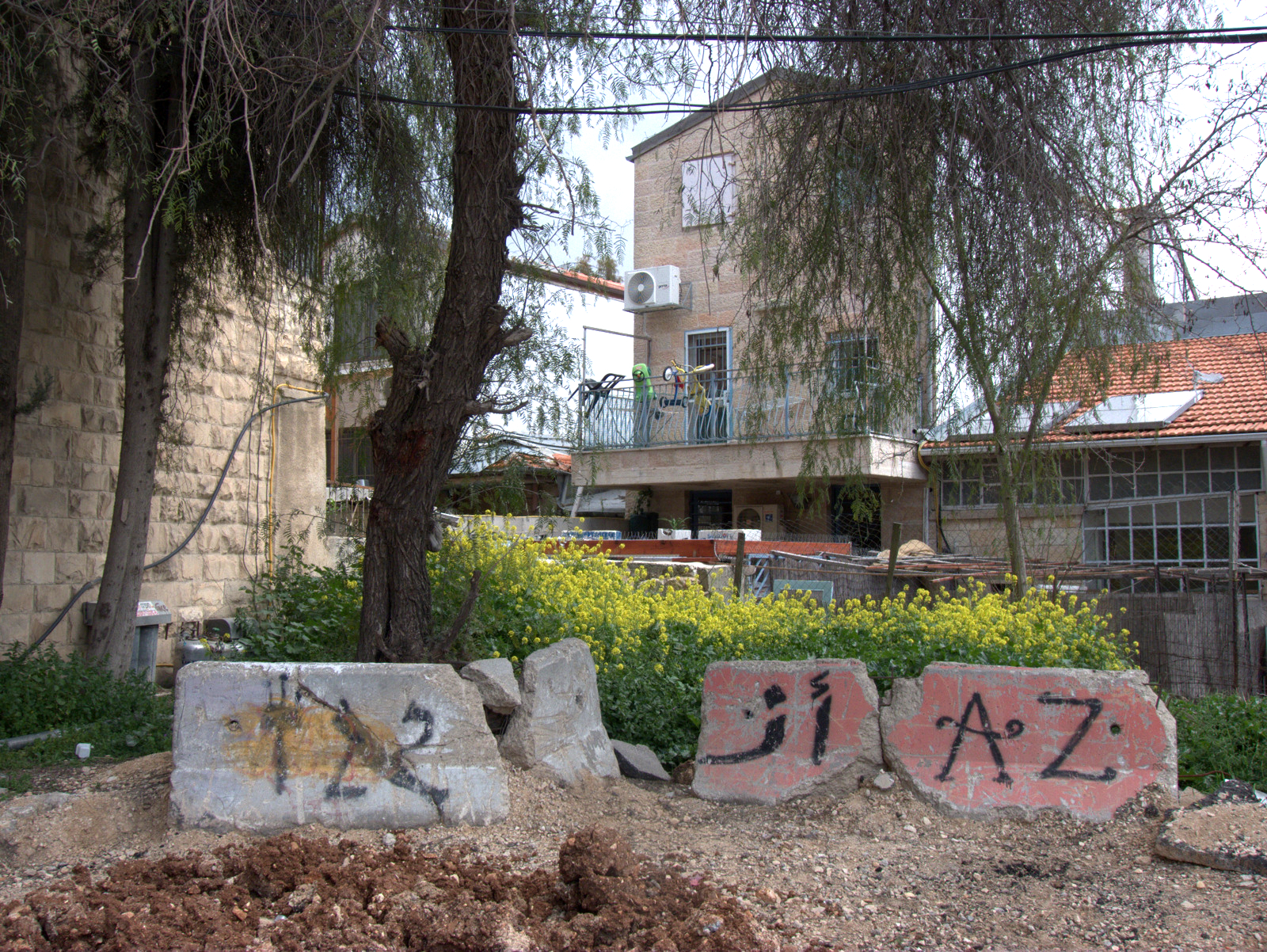
AZ Graffiti

Zagdun is the leader of a fringe, mystically-charged Jewish sect often referred to as the A"Z-niks (from his initials). Considered a charismatic but controversial figure, Zagdun is a cult leader, and spiritual icon to hundreds of followers. The group worships Zagdun, and advertises itself by writing down, on various media the letters ‘‘AZ,’’—Zagdun's initials, and the word אז ("then"), a harbinger of messianic revelation. It has been inscribed or encoded in wedding rings, tallit fringes, graffiti across Jerusalem and Netanya, personal names, and spiritual literature. Personality praise songs and videoclips include one calling him "Our Rabbi, Our Master, Our Zagdun, Our savior, Our messiah". At one time it attracted many students from Yeshivat Ma'ale Gilboa. Zagdun has been ostracized by most Braslov Hasidim but managed to garner a small, loyal following in Jerusalem. Some researchers that addressed the Zagdun and the cult are Jonathan Garb, Tomer Persico and Moshe Ratt.

=== Theology and beliefs ===
Zagdun's teachings blend Kabbalistic mysticism, messianic undertones, and a stark anti-halakhic or antinomianist stance, often rejecting traditional Jewish law outright. Beliefs include:

- The Torah is spiritually ineffective without the guidance of the "True Tzaddiq"—a role Zagdun implicitly claims.
- Zagdun replaces the Torah.
- The Torah of Zagdun is an "elixir of life," while study of traditional Halakha is "a deadly poison".
- The Tzaddiq symbolizes unity, while in the absence of the Tzaddiq, the Torah and even Kabbalah represent plurality. In practice, the Tzaddiq (Zagdun) here replaces God as the symbol of unity.
- Zagdun's 'New Torah' has messianic significance.
- Zagdun identifies the redemption with the actualization of the divinity that is within man. Since he sees himself as the herald of the true redemption, experts have associated this with self-deification, the elevation of oneself to a god-like status.
- Zagdun reveals the higher Torah (the Torah of redemption), that is, the space between the letters, while others see only the letters themselves. He also teaches that the Tzaddiq is a silent figure who symbolizes the space between the letters rather than the text itself, further reinforcing the assertion that Zagdun is the Tzaddiq.
- Zagdun is the bearer of the "New Torah".
- Torah without Zagdun is like a body without a soul.
- Books radiate spiritual power, even unopened, especially those linked to his teachings. Therefore, it is best to study a book in the presence of multiple copies of the book.
- A renouncement of Rabbinic Judaism, including Sabbath observance, and the studying of the Talmud—which are all superseded by Zagdun's Torah.
- The acronym A"Z (his initials) is sacred
- Zagdun is often referred to by followers as the messiah, but he refuses to openly declare it, instead hinting through cryptic teachings.

=== Charismatic and rhetorical practices ===
Zagdun is known for extended silences during lessons, sometimes waiting minutes between words. A family member and former follower described: "He'd say an unrelated word, wait ten minutes, then another unrelated word. Later one of the students will make a rare insight out of it....the student's insight is not always what he [Zagdun] meant".

=== Claimed supernatural abilities ===
==== Bilocation ====
Zagdun is known among his followers for recounting various stories that are described as miracles. In one of his sermons, Zagdun claimed to have been seen simultaneously in Netanya and Jerusalem. According to him, none of the listeners questioned the plausibility of this account. "I have no idea how, but I’ve been told this many times", he said, adding that someone once reported seeing him in a forest at night while he was asleep elsewhere.

"I don’t know why I was given these powers, but I am not a prophet."

— Avraham Haim Zagdun

==== Knowledge of sacred texts ====
One of Zagdun's most remarkable claims is that he possesses direct, intuitive knowledge of Jewish sacred texts, without having studied them traditionally.

"I've never read the Rambam (Maimonides) in my life—but I know what he says."

— Avraham Haim Zagdun

=== Temptation controversy ===
In the early 2000s, as Zagdun began to gain popularity, a young woman was allegedly sent to tempt him. Over the years, various rumors circulated about him, but this was the only one he publicly acknowledged, admitting that he had "fallen". The revelation had a significant impact, leading many followers to leave his movement and join other Breslov-affiliated communities. As a result, Zagdun and his group became increasingly isolated within the broader Hasidic world.

A former student recalled: "At first, he tried to deny it, but eventually told us someone had drugged his drink, which caused him to lose control of his faculties."

Zagdun later offered a justification: "Is there anyone who hasn't had a fall? Just as a car involved in an accident isn't immediately discarded, the same goes for a person. Even Rebbe Nachman said that after someone falls, they can become a complete tzadik [righteous person]. So I don't understand how people who claim to follow Rebbe Nachman can ignore one of his most important teachings. In Psalms, it's written that King David merited that the Messiah would descend from his lineage because he sinned and admitted his sin."

== Cited works ==
- Zagdun, Avraham Haim (2001). אילו ידעתיו הייתיו [If I knew him, I would be him] (in Hebrew). Israel: Beitar Ilit.
- Garb, Jonathan; Berkovits-Murciano, Yaffah (2009). The chosen will become herds: studies in twentieth-century kabbalah. New Haven, [Conn.]: Yale University Press. ISBN 978-0-300-12394-4.
- Zagdun, Avraham Haim. אור גנוז [Hidden Light] (in Hebrew) (1st ed.).
- Buchnik, Shlomi (4 December 2015). "תכירו: האדמור א"ז" (PDF). ידיעות ירושלים. pp. 8–12. Archived (PDF) from the original on 18 May 2025.
