= Chaim Yehuda Leib Auerbach =

Rabbi Chaim Yehuda Leib Auerbach חיים יהודה לייב אוירבך
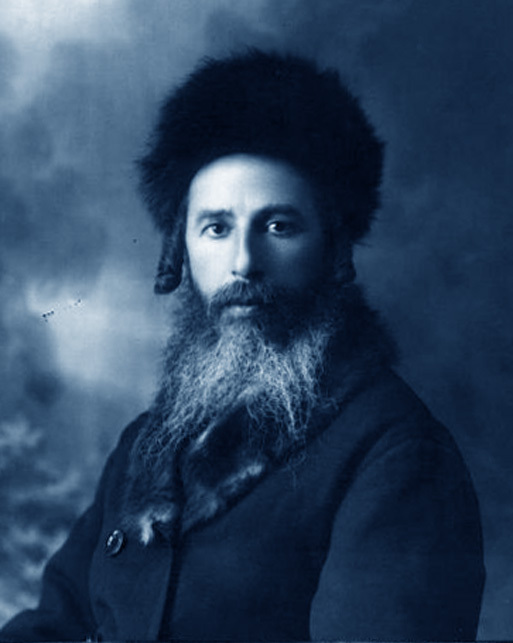

Personal life
- Born: Chaim Yehuda Leib Auerbach; 1883 Chernivtsi, Bukovina
- Died: 26 September 1954 (aged 70–71) Jerusalem
- Buried: Har HaMenuchot
- Spouse: Tzivia Porush
- Children: Shlomo Zalman; Avraham Dov; Eliezer; Refoel Dovid; Leah (wife of Shalom Schwadron); Malka; Rochel
- Parent: Avraham Dov Auerbach (father)

Religious life
- Religion: Judaism
- Yeshiva: Shaar Hashamayim Yeshiva
- Position: Rosh yeshiva
- Began: 1906
- Ended: 1954
- Residence: Jerusalem

Chaim Yehuda Leib Auerbach (Hebrew: חיים יהודה לייב אוירבך; 1883 – 26 September 1954) was a haredi rabbi and rosh yeshiva (dean) of Shaar Hashamayim Yeshiva in Jerusalem, which he helped found in 1906. He was the father of the posek (decider of Jewish legal issues) Shlomo Zalman Auerbach.

== Family ==
His father was Avraham Dov Auerbach, the rebbe of Chernowitz.

Auerbach married Tzivya, the daughter of Shlomo Zalman Porush, a rabbi who founded the Jerusalem neighborhood of Sha'arei Hesed. Their first son, the authority on Jewish law Shlomo Zalman Auerbach, was the first child born in Sha'arei Hesed. The family lived in poverty.

He wrote a Torah commentary called Chacham Lev.

He died on 26 September 1954 (28 Elul 5714), a month after having a heart attack.

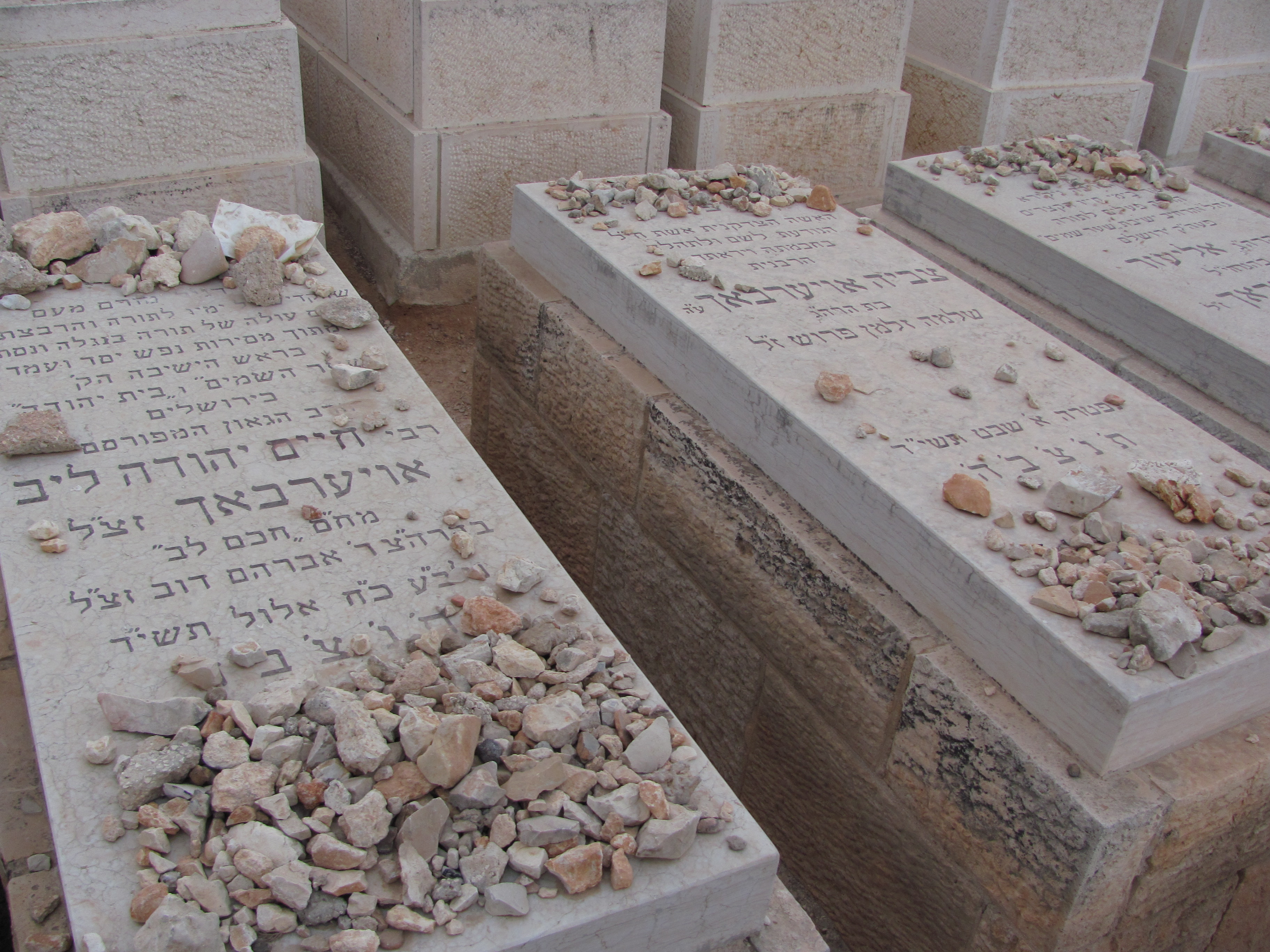
Graves of Auerbach (left), his wife Tzivia (center), and son Eliezer (right).

== Shaar Hashamayim Yeshiva ==
Auerbach and his friend Shimon Tzvi Horowitz opened a yeshiva for the study of the kabbalah as interpreted by the 16th century rabbi Isaac Luria in the Old City of Jerusalem, with a Talmud Torah, a yeshiva ketana, a yeshiva gedola, and a kollel for married students.

Auerbach was rosh yeshiva of Shaar Hashamayim Yeshiva from 1906 until his death in 1954 and was succeeded in the post by two of his sons, first Eliezer Auerbach was rosh yeshiva and then Refoel Dovid Auerbach. His eldest son, Shlomo Zalman Auerbach, served as president of the yeshiva; after his death, his son, Shmuel Auerbach, succeeded him.

== Sources ==
- Lazewnik, Libby (2000). Voice of Truth: The life and eloquence of Rabbi Sholom Schwadron, the unforgettable Maggid of Jerusalem. Brooklyn, N.Y.: Mesorah Publications. p. 29. ISBN 9781578195008.
- Schwartz, Rabbi Yoel (1996). The Man of Truth and Peace: Rabbenu Shlomo Zalman Auerbach zt"l. Kest-Lebovits Jewish Heritage and Roots Library.
