= Shaar Hashamayim Yeshiva =

- ישיבת שער השמים
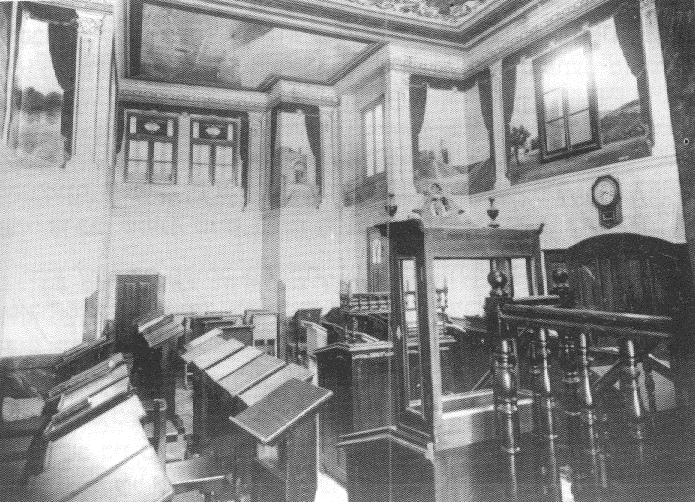
- Interior of the Old City building, 1920s

Location
- 71 Rashi St. Mekor Baruch; Jerusalem
- Coordinates: 31°47′15.54″N 35°12′39.71″E

Information
- Established: 1906
- Rosh Yeshiva: Rabbi Reuven Gross; Rabbi Gamliel Rabinowitz
- Affiliation: Haredi

Shaar Hashamayim Yeshiva (Hebrew: ישיבת שער השמים, lit., "Gate of Heaven") is an Ashkenazi yeshiva in Jerusalem dedicated to the study of the kabbalistic teachings of the Arizal (Rabbi Isaac Luria). It is famous for its student body of advanced kabbalists — many of them roshei yeshiva and Torah scholars — as well as beginning and intermediate scholars who study both the revealed and concealed Torah.

== Name ==
The name of the yeshiva was taken from the Torah passage in which Jacob dreams of a ladder stretching from earth to heaven. After he awakens from his dream, Jacob exclaims, "This is none other than the House of God, and this is the Gate of Heaven (Shaar Hashamayim)!" (Genesis 28:19).

== Origins ==
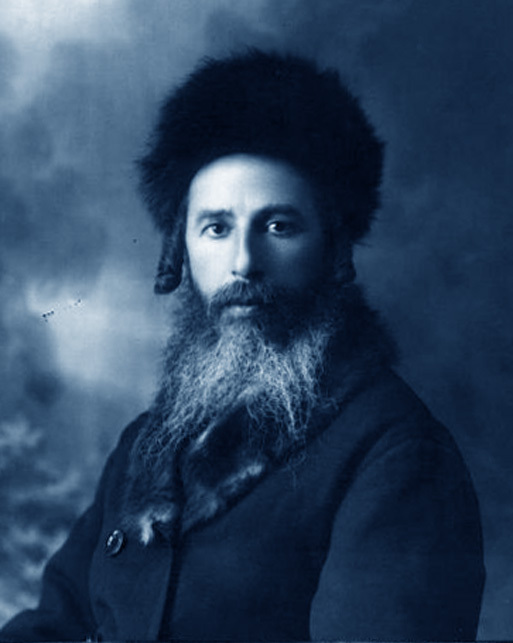
Rabbi Chaim Yehuda Leib Auerbach, founder and rosh yeshiva.

The impetus to found Shaar Hashamayim Yeshiva came from a dream experienced by two noteworthy Jerusalem rabbis on the same night in 1906. Rabbi Chaim Yehuda Leib Auerbach, author of Chacham Lev, awoke one night from a strange dream and went back to sleep, only to be awakened again after the dream repeated itself. He got dressed and set out for the home of Rabbi Shimon Horowitz, a kabbalah scholar and author of Shem MiShimon and Kol Mevaser, to discuss the dream with him. As he walked, he saw someone approaching him in the night and was surprised that it was none other than Horowitz, who was coming to see him about the dream he had just dreamed. It turned out that they had dreamed the same dream. They had each envisioned an honorable Jew, his face shining with a supernatural light, who had demanded to know why people weren't studying his teachings. "My Torah has the power to bring the Divine Presence back from its exile," the man told them. The two realized that the man in the dream was the Arizal, the sixteenth-century mystic of Safed, who was known to have regretted the fact that few Jewish men who studied the Torah also studied Kabbalah, in particular the Ashkenazi Jews of Jerusalem. At that time, the only place where the Arizal's teachings were studied was the Beit El Synagogue in Jerusalem. On the spot, Auerbach and Horowitz decided to open a yeshiva for the study of the Arizal's kabbalah and share the responsibilities as joint roshei yeshiva.

The yeshiva opened shortly afterwards in the Old City of Jerusalem, with accommodations for a Talmud Torah, a yeshiva ketana, a yeshiva gedola, and a kollel for married students.

== Curriculum ==
In 1924, the yeshiva published a pamphlet describing its aims and approach as follows:

First, the study of the revealed Torah, as it is studied in all the holy yeshivot, [including] Shas in depth and poskim. Second, the study of kabbalah, mussar and inquiry. [This is] the only place in the world where the Torah of kabbalah is studied in an orderly manner, progressing from simple teachings to more difficult ones, taught by talmidei chachamim who are qualified for the task. …

The yeshiva's intention is not to provide its students with a simple, superficial understanding of the works of kabbalah, to afford a mere glimpse, wherein lies the danger of stumbling — as Chazal put it, "He glimpsed and was injured." Only extensive inquiry and in-depth study of all the kabbalah works ensures full, rounded knowledge. This is what Yeshivas Shaar HaShamayim and its branches aim to provide.

Then as now, kabbalists who wish to study at the yeshiva must demonstrate extensive knowledge of the revealed Torah, and spend half the day in the yeshiva learning the revealed Torah. The yeshiva offers daily shiurim (classes) in Talmud, poskim, halakha and aggadah. Classes on the concealed Torah (i.e., kabbalah) are organized by level. The first level is introductory, with the study of the Arizal's Otzros Chaim. The second level studies the Arizal's lessons in Eitz Chaim in depth. The third level studies the kavannot (mystical concentrations) of the Rashash.

=== Student body ===
One of the first students in the new yeshiva was Rabbi Tzvi Pesach Frank, a dayan (rabbinical judge) on the Jerusalem beit din (rabbinical court) and future Chief Rabbi of Jerusalem. The yeshiva has produced a number of Torah scholars, Torah disseminators and rabbis. It has also published many works on kabbalah.

== Destruction and relocation ==
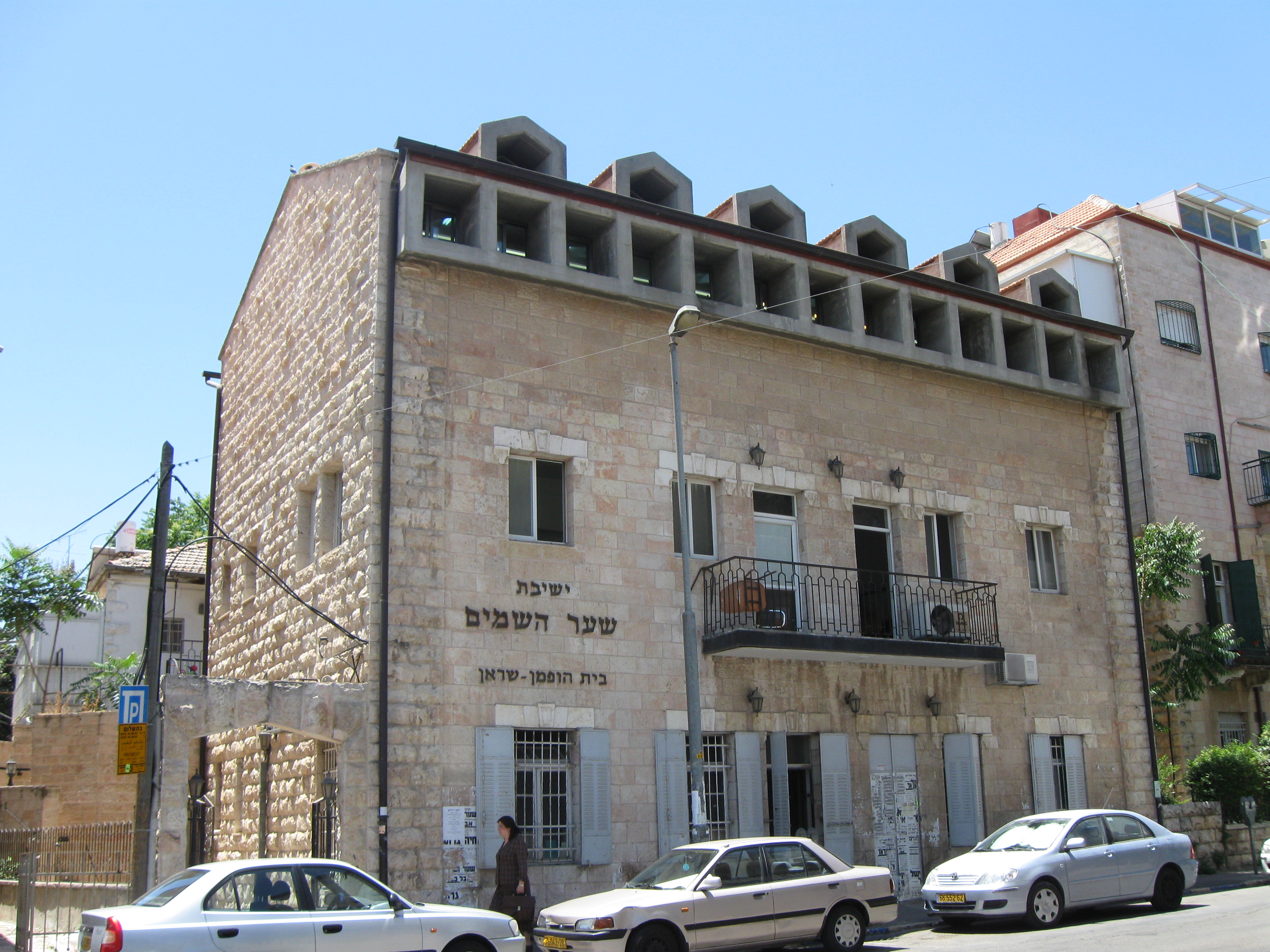
The current home of the yeshiva on Rashi St. in the Mekor Baruch neighborhood of Jerusalem. Note the 13 windows under the roof line.

Shaar Hashamayim Yeshiva operated at 1 Gal'ed Street in the Old City of Jerusalem from 1906 to 1948. The 1927 Jericho earthquake damaged the building. During the 1948 Arab-Israeli War, Haganah fighters used the yeshiva's roof to fire on the Jordanian army. When the Old City fell to the Jordanians, the yeshiva evacuated to Amatzia Street in the Katamon neighborhood. The Jordanians set fire to the Old City building, burning all the seforim (holy books) and furniture inside. After the liberation of the Old City by the Israeli army in 1967, the yeshiva tried to reclaim its property, without success.

Shaar Hashamayim Yeshiva next moved to the Beit Yisrael neighborhood, occupying the building that now houses the shtieblekh. In 1958, the yeshiva moved to Rashbam Street in the Mekor Baruch neighborhood.

When Rabbi Refoel Dovid Auerbach became the rosh yeshiva, he succeeded in establishing a permanent home for the yeshiva at 71 Rashi Street in 1992. The design for the uppermost story of the building features thirteen windows on the sides facing the street and the rear courtyard, totaling twenty-six (the gematria of YHWH, one of the names of God). (In recent years, a building addition on the top rear story covered over three of the thirteen windows there.)

== Leadership ==
The first roshei yeshiva of Shaar Hashamayim Yeshiva were the founders, Rabbi Chaim Yehuda Leib Auerbach and Rabbi Shimon Horowitz. Auerbach chose to stay with the yeshiva even after his father, the Admor of Chernowitz-Chmielnik, died and his Hasidim asked Auerbach to take his father's place. He declined, leaving the position of Admor unfulfilled.

Following Auerbach's death in 1954, his son, Rabbi Eliezer Auerbach, led the yeshiva for many years. After his death, another of Auerbach's sons, Rabbi Refoel Dovid Auerbach, assumed leadership. Subsequent roshei yeshiva were Rabbi Aharon Slotkin (who died in 1973), Rabbi Yechiel Fishel Eisenbach (who served from 1973 until his death in 2008), and the current roshei yeshiva, Rabbi Yaakov Meir Shechter and Rabbi Gamliel Rabinowitz.

Auerbach's eldest son, Rabbi Shlomo Zalman Auerbach, served as president of the yeshiva; after his death, his son, Rabbi Shmuel Auerbach, succeeded him. Rabbi Shlomo Zalman's nephew, Rabbi Yakov Schlaff, acts as yeshiva administrator.

== Public events ==
Shaar HaShamayim Yeshiva invites the public to participate in special yeshiva events during the year. The most popular is the Thursday afternoon prayer service held during the weeks of Shovavim (the weeks coinciding with the Torah readings of Shemot, Va'eira, Bo, Beshalach, Yitro, and Mishpatim, and, in a Jewish leap year, Terumah and Tetzaveh). This service incorporates special kabbalistic tikkunim (rectifications). Other types of tikkunim and pidyonos (redemptions) are also held in the yeshiva, but without publicity.

Shaar HaShamayim Yeshiva has increased public awareness of the yahrzeit of the Arizal on 5 Av, and reintroduced the custom of visiting his gravesite in Safed on that day.

== See also ==
- Beit El Synagogue
