= North Woodmere, New York =

Coordinates: 40°39′00″N 73°43′26″W

- Hamlet
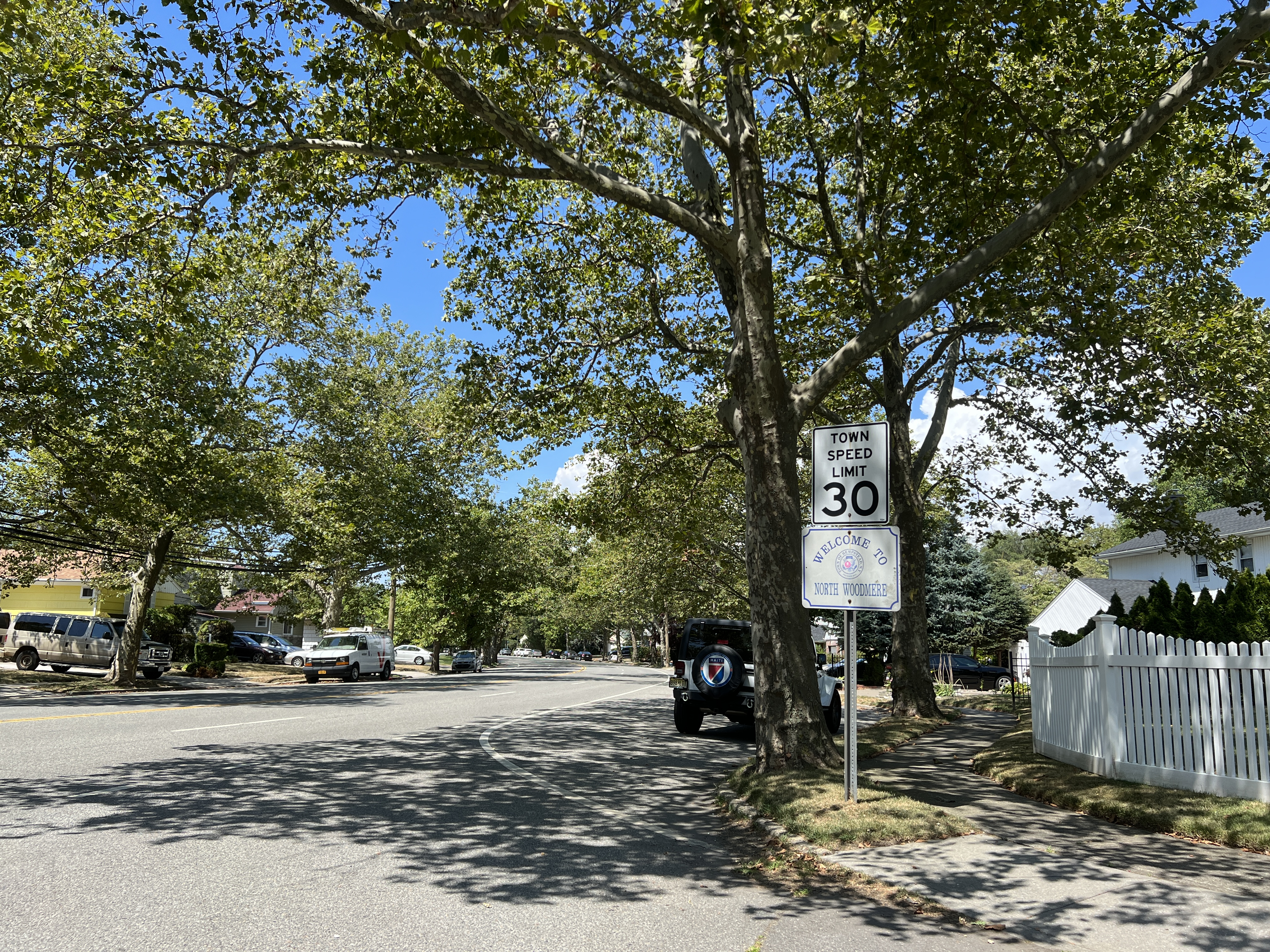
- Rosedale Road in North Woodmere
- Interactive map of North Woodmere, New York
- Country: United States
- State: New York
- County: Nassau
- Town: Hempstead
- Time zone: UTC−5 (Eastern (EST))
  - Summer (DST): UTC−4 (EDT)
- Area codes: 516, 363

North Woodmere is an unincorporated hamlet in the Town of Hempstead, New York, located in far western Nassau County on the South Shore of Long Island.

== History ==
Prior to its development in the late 1950s, the land stretching from Lawrence to South Valley Stream was owned by attorney Franklin B. Lord (President of the Long Island Water Company in the late nineteenth century). The water company pumping station also occupied some of this property and is there to this day. His estate, known as "The Lord's Woods" went through Cedarhurst and Lawrence, all the way to Far Rockaway. At Mill Road, the woods thinned out and there was farmland. The last vestige of these woods remains today at the Long Island Water Property.

In 1956, as the housing boom transformed Nassau County's landscape, this last remaining area of natural woodland in southwest Nassau was the subject of a dispute between conservation groups, residents, and developers. Woodmere Woods, over 100 acres of woodland bordered by Peninsula Boulevard and Mill Road, was originally part of the Long Island Water Corporation's property. The Peninsula Shopping Center is now situated where Girl Scouts and Boy Scouts had camping weekends.

By the late 1950s, technology had developed to dig deeper wells, and despite conservationists protesting, the Long Island Water Corp. opted to sell off a vast swath of their property for development. By the end of 1958, the woods were completely gone, and the newly developed area christened "North Woodmere Knolls".

In 1962, voters approved the County of Nassau purchasing approximately 27 acres (11 ha) of land and approximately 45 acres (18 ha) of water for the development of North Woodmere County Park.

While officially South Valley Stream (North Woodmere is served by the Valley Stream Post Office), the developers came up with a marketing ploy to associate their tract homes with the more upscale Five Towns. North Woodmere became part of Hewlett-Woodmere School District 14, and is unofficially considered part of The Five Towns due to their cultural and social relationships.

== Geography ==
North Woodmere is directly north of Woodmere, but separated from it by Motts Creek. Access to Woodmere is available via Branch Boulevard, Brookfield Road, and a footbridge over the creek. Unlike Woodmere, North Woodmere is not part of the Five Towns, which consists of the villages of Lawrence and Cedarhurst, the hamlets of Hewlett, Inwood and Woodmere.

Hungry Harbor Road is the main east–west route through North Woodmere, connecting with Branch Boulevard (to Cedarhurst) and Brookfield-Rosedale Road (to Valley Stream). Park Lane provides access to upper Rosedale Road, and from there to Francis Lewis Boulevard, Sunrise Highway, and the Belt Parkway and Cross Island Parkway junction.

== Economy ==
A shopping mall is located on Rosedale Road. A former shopping center on Hungry Harbor Road became an assisted living center.

The community is home to North Woodmere Park, a Nassau County park. The park includes a pool complex, a playground, a nine-hole golf course, a lighted driving range, and a fishing area.

== Demographics ==
North Woodmere houses many residents with advanced degrees and higher educational attainment. Many residents attend four year colleges and professional schools thereafter. There is an educational culture throughout the town.

== Government ==
North Woodmere is represented on the Town of Hempstead Council by Melissa Miller.

Politics

In the 2024 United States presidential election, the majority of North Woodmere voters voted for Donald Trump (R).

== Culture ==
North Woodmere is home to several synagogues, including Congregation Ohr Torah, Young Israel of North Woodmere, Beis Haknesses of North Woodmere, Temple Hillel, Kodesh, Kehillas Bnei Hayeshivos, Khal Lev Avos, Khal Chasidim, Khal Noam Hashem and Chabad of Valley Stream. In 1984, Ronald Reagan addressed Temple Hillel.

== Education ==
This area is served by two school districts: 15 (Lawrence Public Schools) in the west, and 14 (Hewlett-Woodmere School District) in the center.

== Notable residents ==
- Bruce Blakeman, Nassau County Executive and first Presiding Officer of Nassau County, and 2026 New York gubernatorial election Republican Nominee
- David M. Friedman (born 1958), U.S. ambassador to Israel
- Jeffrey M. Friedman (born 1954), discoverer of leptin
- Martin Heit, photographer credited with creating Plastislate, an early forerunner of the modern whiteboard.
- Esther Jungreis (1936–2016), founder of Hineni
- Wendy Kaufman, spokesperson for Snapple and TV personality
- Norm Kent (born 1949), past president of the National Organization for the Reform of Marijuana Laws (NORML), radio host, publisher.
- Aryeh Lebowitz (born 1977), Director of Semikhah at Rabbi Isaac Elchanan Theological Seminary
- Seth Rudetsky, composer, musical director and talk show host.
- Steve Spinner, founder of Sports Potential, adviser to Obama campaign, Department of Energy official.
