= Itzkovitch Synagogue =

Shtiebel in Bnei Brak, Israel

- Hebrew: בית הכנסת איצקוביץ'
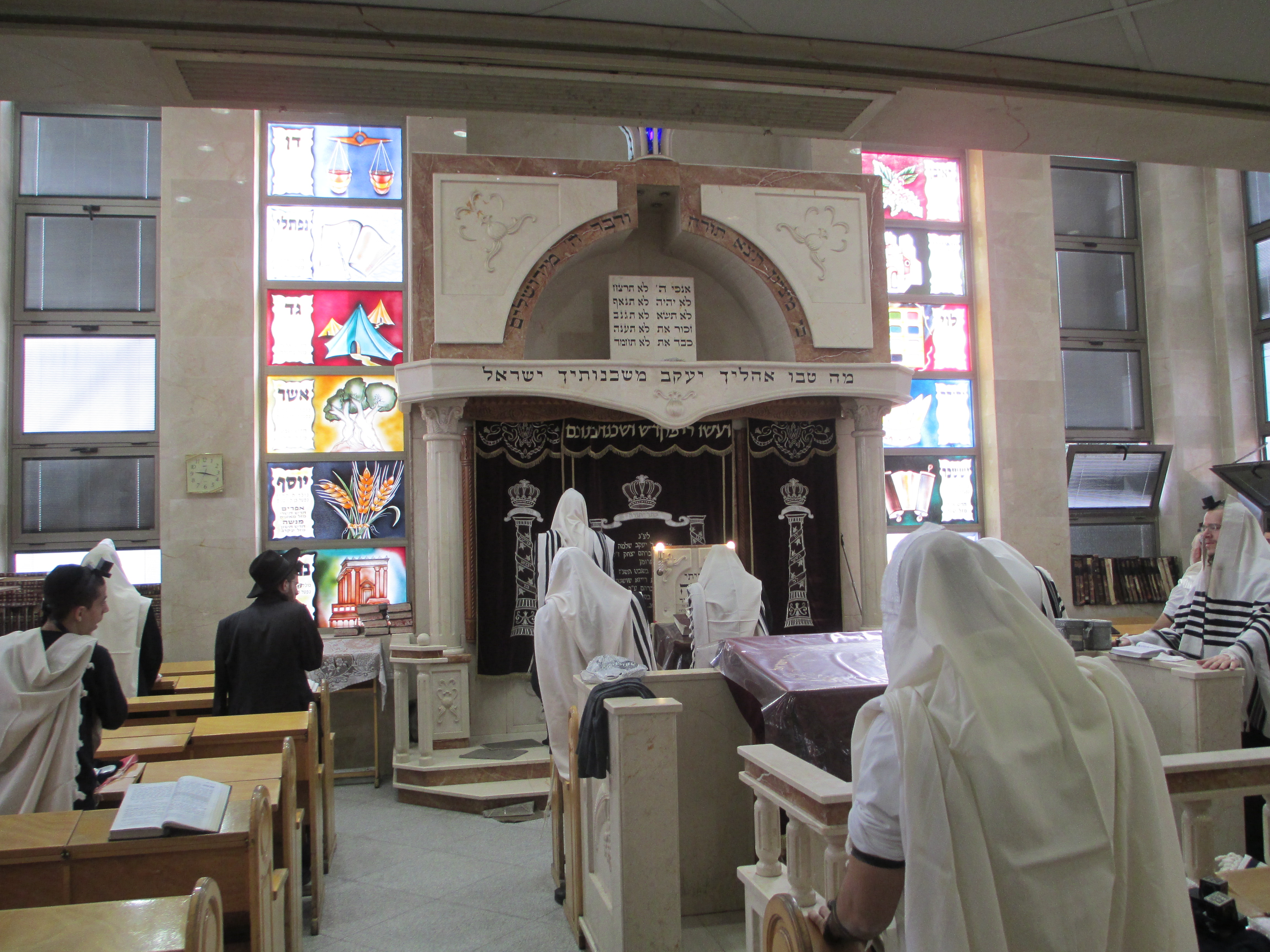
- Prayers at synagogue, in 2013

- Location of the synagogue in Tel Aviv

Religion
- Affiliation: Orthodox Judaism
- Ecclesiastical or organisational status: Shtiebel
- Status: Active

Location
- Location: Bnei Brak, Tel Aviv
- Country: Israel
- Coordinates: 32°05′09″N 34°50′08″E

Architecture
- Founder: Zvi Itzkovitch and Malka Itzkovitch

Itzkovitch Synagogue (Hebrew: בית הכנסת איצקוביץ') is an Orthodox Jewish shtiebel, located in central Bnei Brak, in greater Tel Aviv, Israel.

== History ==
Itzkovitch Synagogue is one of the most active synagogues in the world, with prayer services taking place around the clock in multiple rooms. There are an average of 17,000 visitors a day.

== See also ==
- History of the Jews in Israel
- List of synagogues in Israel
