= Shlomo Zalman Porush =

Rabbi Shlomo Zalman Porush (Hebrew: שלמה זלמן פרוש; 1850–1898) was one of the founders of the Shaarei Chessed Fund and neighborhood in Jerusalem.

== Biography ==
He was born in Babruysk, Russian Empire (now Belarus) in 1850 to his father Rabbi Naftali Zvi Porush (d. 1866) and mother Leah (d. 1900).

He arrived in Eretz Yisroel as a boy in 1860 together with his parents and a brother Gershon and a sister. As a Jerusalem community leader of the Yishuv haYashan he created the Shaarei Chesed Free-Loan Fund, the first of its kind in Jerusalem, which he directed on a voluntary basis for 18 years. After his death, the organization founded the neighborhood of Shaarei Chesed.

Some of his children were also leaders of the Yishuv haYashan. His children were: Rabbi Naftali Zvi Porush (the second), Rabbi Akiva Porush, Rabbi Aaron Porush, Rabbi Eliezer Lipa (Lipman) Porush, Rabbi Liber Mordechai Porush. A daughter married his brother Gershon's son Rabbi Menachem Mendel Porush. Another daughter Tzivia married Rabbi Chaim Yehuda Leib Auerbach and their son was Rabbi Shlomo Zalman Auerbach who was named after him.

He died in Jerusalem in 1898 and is buried on the Mount of Olives.
