= Steve Spinner =

American business executive (born 1969)

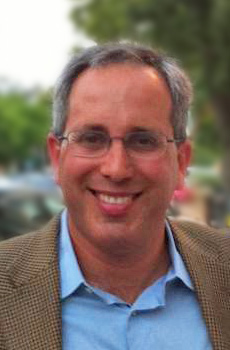
- Born: July 17, 1969; North Woodmere, New York, United States
- Education: Harvard University (MBA), Wesleyan University (BA)
- Occupations: Business Executive, Angel investor
- Spouse: Allison Spinner (2002)
- Children: Two (sons)

Steven Jonathan Spinner (born July 17, 1969) is an American business executive who is known for his work as an angel investor and adviser to Silicon Valley startups and his volunteer work as a fundraiser for President Barack Obama’s 2008 and 2012 presidential campaigns. He previously served as a stimulus adviser for the United States Department of Energy and was peripherally associated with the Department of Energy loan to a failed solar company, Solyndra.

== Education ==
Spinner was born and grew up in North Woodmere, New York. He received his BA from Wesleyan University in 1991, where he majored in economics and classics. At Wesleyan he ran cross country for four years, was elected a member of Phi Beta Kappa and won the school’s Maynard Award as the top scholar-athlete. He received an MBA from Harvard Business School in 1996 where he served as Vice President of the Harvard Graduate Council.

== Business ==
=== Early career and Olympics ===
After graduating from Wesleyan, Spinner worked in McKinsey & Company’s Hong Kong office as a Henry Luce Scholar. Spinner turned to serving the U.S. by working to develop marketing partnerships in connection with the 1996 Summer Olympic Games in Atlanta, Georgia. As Program Manager for Atlanta Centennial Olympic Properties (the official joint marketing program of the USOC and the host city), Spinner managed a marketing evaluation strategy that led to $655 million in corporate sponsorships, including $426 million of official domestic sponsorships. His forecasting models in connection with the 1996 Olympics led to the largest TV rights purchase in U.S. history to that date.

Between 1996 and 2000 he worked for NBC attaining the position of Senior Vice President of strategic partnerships. He then served as Senior Vice President at NotifyMe Networks.

=== Entrepreneurship ===
Spinner has spent more than 15 years advising startup companies in technology, media and retail, as well as founding a small business. In 2002 he founded the company Sports Potential in Menlo Park, California which offers a test called SMART to assess the mental and physical qualities of children and guide them to appropriate sports. Candidates are tested on a variety of physical skills, ranging from speed to balance.

More recently, Spinner has become an active angel investor in addition to his role as advisor to startup companies and small businesses in the greater San Francisco area. He is known as a "connector" within Silicon Valley, introducing venture capitalists to other entrepreneurs, and currently serves as an angel investor and advisor to more than 10 companies. Spinner is a speaker at various think tanks and has spoken as an expert at university entrepreneurship forums.

== Public service ==
=== Policy ===
Spinner was a senior fellow and served as energy policy adviser with the Center for American Progress. Spinner publicly advocated for energy policies that support clean, renewable energy.

=== Politics ===
As an early, prominent supporter of Senator Obama from the technology sector, Spinner was one of the Obama campaign's authors for its innovation agenda announced at Google's headquarters in November 2007. After election day, Spinner was asked to serve on the Obama-Biden Transition Project in its Technology, Innovation & Government Reform Working Group (focusing on "Innovation and National Priorities" initiatives). During the President's 2012 reelection campaign, Spinner served as a California finance chair and founded "Technology for Obama" (T4O). He also prominently supported Hillary Clinton by spearheading the Obama campaign's effort to raise funds to retire Clinton's 2008 Presidential election campaign debt.

On April 2, 2013, Spinner was announced as Campaign Chair for Ro Khanna for Congress in his effort to represent California's 17th congressional district (south Silicon Valley) Working with Jeremy Bird, Larry Grisolano and other senior Obama 2012 campaign veterans, he said "the goal in bringing together the best talent from the Obama team is to run a campaign in a strong Democratic district that operates like a battleground state in a presidential election".

=== Public service ===
Seeking to help the country in the economic recovery, Spinner served as a stimulus adviser for the United States Department of Energy. Spinner was hired to bring Silicon Valley experience to a Washington bureaucracy. Spinner acted as a liaison between the Recovery Act Office and the Loan Programs Office. Spinner started as a loan program advisor to Energy Secretary Steven Chu in April 2009, a month after the department had approved a conditional commitment for Solyndra’s loan guarantee. He left in September 2010. Spinner served as the DOE's lead representative on the White House Business Council, White House Innovation Cohort, and White House Automotive Communities Task Force.

In 2011, he was peripherally involved in the Solyndra loan controversy and it was reported that he pushed a loan "across the finish line" ahead of a September groundbreaking ceremony. According to the Department of Energy, Spinner "played no role in the decision-making on or evaluation of individual loan applications" and his role in Solyndra was limited to the timing and production of the ceremony itself. Public documents released by the White House that detail Spinner's emails to Department of Energy officials confirm this limited role.

On June 26, 2015, Spinner was announced by President Obama as a Member to the President's Commission on White House Fellowships.

== Personal ==
Spinner met his wife, Allison, in Silicon Valley with whom he has two young boys. He is a board member of the Las Lomitas Education Foundation. He competed in and finished the 2003 Ironman Switzerland.
