= Yaakov Meir Shechter =

Hasidic rabbi in Israel (born 1930)

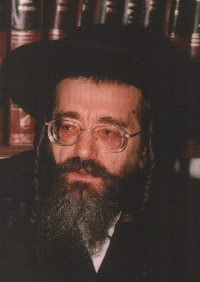
Portrait of Yaakov Meir Shechter

Rabbi Yaakov Meir Shechter (Hebrew: יעקב מאיר שכטר; born November 6, 1930) is a prominent rabbi and teacher in the Breslov Hasidic movement in Israel. He is a well-known kabbalist and a rosh yeshiva of both the main Breslov Yeshiva in Meah Shearim, Jerusalem, and the Non-Breslov Shaar Hashamayim Yeshiva in Mekor Baruch. His lectures, both in oral and written form, emphasize the application of Breslov and other related Chassidic and non-Chassidic teachings to the challenges of life and the pursuit of spiritual growth.

== Early life ==
Rabbi Yaakov Meir Shechter was born in the Old City of Jerusalem to a prominent Breslover family headed by his father, Rabbi Dovid Shechter. During his youth in the Old City, Shechter learned from Breslov elders of the previous generation — especially Rabbi Abraham Sternhartz, who had immigrated to Israel from Uman, Ukraine in 1936.

The Shechter family was expelled from the Old City together with the rest of the Jewish population by the Jordanian army during the 1948 Arab-Israeli War. They resettled in the Katamon neighborhood of Jerusalem, where a Breslov yeshiva was founded. Later, the family moved again to the Meah Shearim neighborhood of Jerusalem near the main Breslov yeshiva, which was founded in 1953.

== Breslov leader ==
Rabbi Shechter is widely regarded as the leading figure of the faction of Breslov which is connected to the larger Ashkenazi Hasidic community, centered in Meah Shearim.

Thousands of people from all over the world and from all backgrounds flock to him for guidance on all matters, and for his blessings.

== Publications ==
A selection of Rabbi Shechter's talks from Leket Amarim (A Collection of Talks) was translated into English as In All Your Ways: A Guide to Avodas Hashem (Moznaim Publishers). This work incorporates Shechter's broad knowledge of Talmud, Midrash, Mussar, Breslov Hasidut, and Kabbalah into an inspirational guide for the spiritual seeker.

Many publications in Hebrew, including a few volumes of letters, kdas nefesh mshivas, hamvorech yisborech.
