= Nachman Goldstein =

Ukrainian rabbi (1825–1894)

Nachman Goldstein of Tcherin (1825 – 1894), also known as the Tcheriner Rav (rabbi of Tcherin, a town in eastern Ukraine), was a leading disciple of Nathan of Breslov (known as "Reb Noson"), who in turn was the chief disciple of Rebbe Nachman of Breslov, the founder of the Breslov Hasidic dynasty.

== Biography ==
A child prodigy who excelled in his Torah studies even as a young boy, Goldstein was the grandson of Rabbi Aharon, the chief rabbi of Breslov in Rebbe Nachman's day, and the son of Rabbi Zvi Aryeh, the succeeding rabbi of Breslov. He grew up in the town of Breslov. However, in his youth he shied away from Reb Noson. Once Reb Noson said to him, "Nachman, who knows? Maybe the reason Rebbe Nachman worked so hard to bring your grandfather to Breslav was because of you?" After that, Goldstein became a follower of Reb Noson, and after the latter's death, became very involved with Reb Noson's works.

Goldstein raised his daughter's son, Abraham Sternhartz, after the latter was orphaned of his parents as a young child. As the grandson of Reb Noson's leading disciple and at the same time a great-grandson of Noson through his father's line, Sternhartz was privy to all the family traditions and stories about Rebbe Nachman's closest disciple. These formed the basis for his definitive collection of Breslov oral traditions, entitled Tovot Zichronot.

== Publications ==
Goldstein was the first to write a learned commentary specifically on Rebbe Nachman's teachings, giving scholarly legitimacy to the Breslov movement after the death of Reb Noson in 1844. Many of today's English-language translations of Breslover works were only made possible because of the Tcheriner Rav's meticulous research and elucidation.

He collected and published Noson's eight-volume magnum opus, Likutey Halachot, as well as an expanded version of Noson's Likutey Etzot (Advice) with additional material from Rebbe Nachman's teachings, under the title, Likutey Etzot HaMeshulash. Altogether, the Tcheriner Rav authored about 20 works, including halakhic responsa. Some were only seen by Breslover Hasidim in manuscript form before they were lost during World War II. The ones that survive are:

- Parparaot LeChokhmah—a commentary that illuminates many complex concepts and structures in Likutey Moharan
- Zimrat HaAretz—a commentary that connects each lesson in Likutey Moharan to the Land of Israel
- Yekara DeShabbata—a commentary that relates each lesson in Likutey Moharan to the Sabbath day
- Yerach HaEitanim—a commentary that relates each lesson in Likutey Moharan to Rosh Hashanah, Yom Kippur and Sukkot
- Nachat HaShulchan—a commentary that describes the connection between numerous chapters of the Shulchan Aruch and the first lesson of Likutey Moharan
- Rimzey Ma'asiyyot—a commentary on Sippurey Ma'asiyot (Rabbi Nachman's Stories)

Goldstein also produced a collection of source texts for Sefer HaMiddot (The Aleph-Bet Book—a collection of aphorisms on character traits), tracing Rebbe Nachman's references throughout the Bible, Talmud and Midrash. He also compiled teachings of the Baal Shem Tov and the Maggid of Mezeritch and their major disciples under the titles Leshon Hasidim and Derekh Hasidim.

== See also ==
- Breslov (Hasidic dynasty)
- Nachman of Breslov
- Nathan of Breslov
- Abraham Sternhartz
