= Hazon Yeshaya Humanitarian Network =

- Formation: 1997
- Type: Charity Organization
- Headquarters: 60 Rashi Street
- Location: Jerusalem, Israel
- Chief Executive Officer: Abraham Israel
- Website: HazonYeshaya.org

Hazon Yeshaya Humanitarian Network was an Israeli charity organization, based in Jerusalem, that provided a number of services for impoverished Israelis, regardless of religious affiliation. The organization was founded by Abraham Israel in 1997.

In April 2012, the Israel Police arrested 10 employees of Hazon, including the head, "on suspicion of pocketing millions of dollars from donors abroad for poor people, including Holocaust victims."

All information on this page regarding Hazon Yeshaya's charity work are claims made by the organization that were later proved to be untrue.

== Leadership ==
In 1956, after the Suez War, Abraham Israel's family fled Egypt to escape growing anti-Semitism. They spent three years in Paris, France before immigrating to the United States of America. Abraham Israel received a bachelor's degree in business administration from Baruch College in New York City and worked as a shoe importer. In 1997, Abraham Israel moved to Israel with his family and founded Hazon Yeshaya.

== Soup kitchens ==
Hazon Yeshaya soup kitchens served more than 400,000 meals each month at more than 60 distribution points around Israel and is the only organization that provided soup kitchens facilities 365 days of the year in Israel. Beneficiaries included over 10,000 school children whose teachers have identified them to be in need of better nutrition. In 2008, expenditures on soup kitchens, including holiday packages, amounted to $9.9 million.

== Dental services ==
Hazon Yeshaya Dental Clinics offered free services to an average of 2,000 patients each year. Services offered include implants, endodontics, crowns and bridges, periodontal therapy and surgery, dentures and orthodontic treatment. In 2008, expenditures on free dental clinics amounted to about $204,000.

== Vocational training ==
Hazon Yeshaya offered a free vocational training for battered, divorced and single women, new immigrants, and discharged soldiers. Programs taught include hairdressing and barbering, cosmetics, computer skills, secretarial skills and office management. In 2008, more than 700 students participated and expenditures on vocational training amounted to about $591,000.

== Programs for children ==
=== School Lunches ===
More than 10,000 school children whose teachers have identified as in need of better nutrition received free school lunches prepared in the Hazon Yeshaya Soup Kitchens.

=== Bar and Bat Mitzvah Celebrations ===
Hazon Yeshaya organized bar and bat mitzvah services for orphans and children from abusive and broken homes. Approximately 600 children participated in 2008.

=== After-School Programs ===
Hazon Yeshaya provided structured after-school programs for children in math, reading, computer activities and sports. The program served about 5,000 children per year.

=== Day Care ===
Hazon Yeshaya Day Care Centers provided day care for underprivileged preschooler students whose parents cannot afford tuition. In 2008, there were 250 children enrolled in the program and expenditures amounted to about $942,000.

== Holocaust registry ==
As part of its activities, Hazon Yeshaya identified and documented survivors of the Holocaust, many of them impoverished. The organization maintained a registry of some 15,000 names from more than a dozen countries. More than 5,000 individuals who were registered received services from Hazon Yeshaya. Programs included meals-on-wheels and free dental work.

== Funding controversy ==
In early 2012, the Israeli Registrar of Non-Profits began conducting an investigation of Hazon Yeshaya after it has received numerous complaints about its financial activities. Many of the international branches of Hazon Yeshaya have ceased channeling funds, including those in the UK, Canada, Hong Kong, Australia, South Africa and France.

On April 8, 2012, police arrested 10 employees, reportedly including the "head of" Hazon Yeshaya on suspicion of fraud and embezzlement. News reports suggest that the suspects cheated donors, and perhaps funds received from the Conference on Jewish Material Claims Against Germany, by not using the funds for their direct intended purpose, to purchase food for the needy and Holocaust survivors. Instead the food was sold to ultra-Orthodox groups and the arrested are suspected of pocketing those funds. The fraud also included claims of fake food distribution centers. In addition to the theft, police suspect the charity of money laundering, aggravated fraudulent receipt of goods, and forging corporate documents. Police raided Hazon Yeshaya's offices in Jerusalem and seized records. The extent of the fraud and theft could be as high as "tens of millions of dollars."

On July 1, 2012, the Jerusalem District Court gave another Israeli charity organization, Carmei Ha'Ir, responsibility for providing food services formerly provided by Hazon Yehsaya.
