= Shtiebel =

Place used for communal Jewish prayer

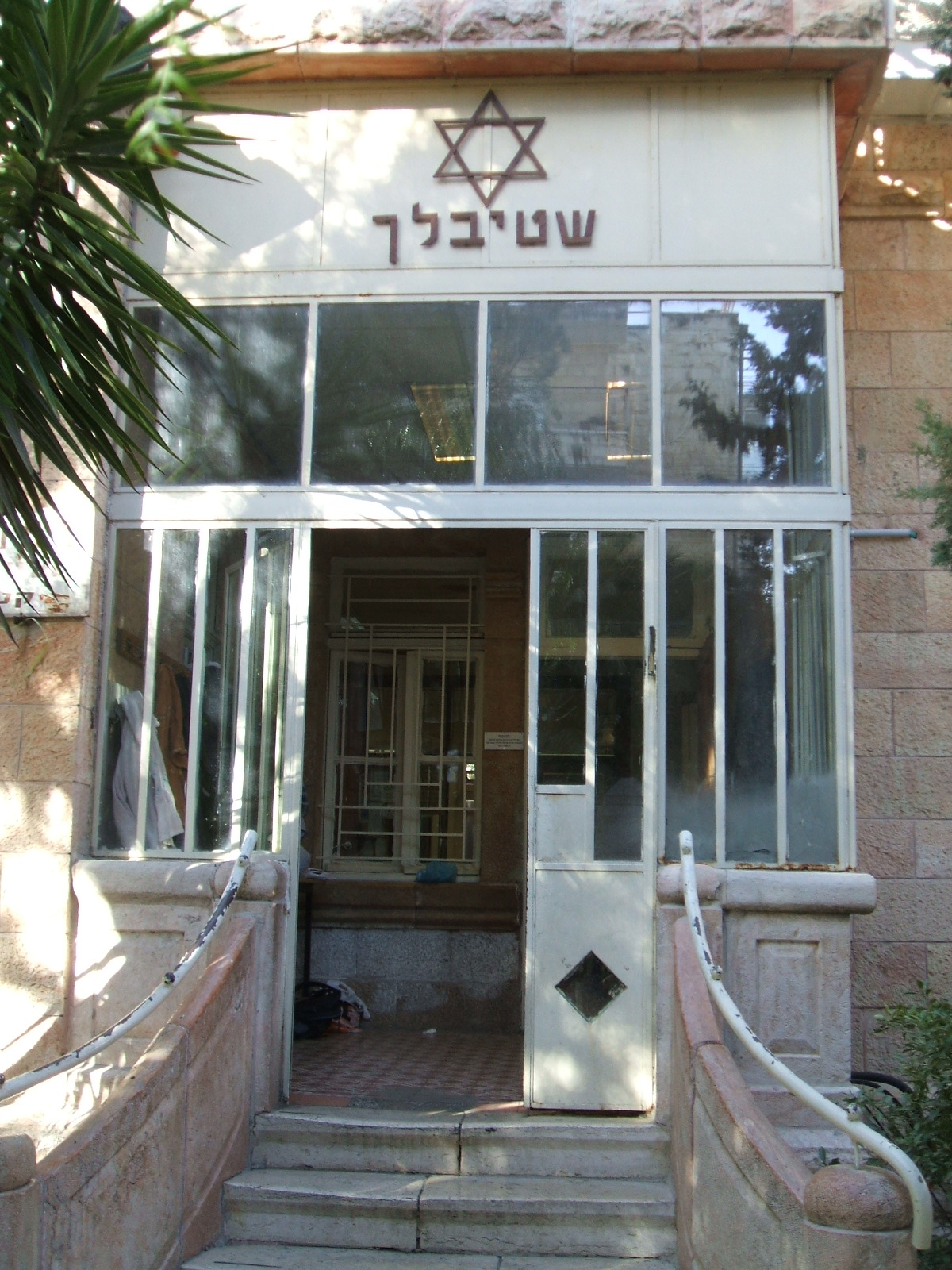
"Shtiblach" in Katamon, Jerusalem

A shtiebel (Yiddish: שטיבל, romanized: shtibl, lit. 'little room or house', pl. שטיבעלעך shtibelekh) is a place used for communal Jewish prayer. In contrast to a formal synagogue, a shtiebel is far smaller and approached more casually. It is typically as small as a room in a private home or a place of business that is set aside for the express purpose of prayer, or it may be as large as a small-sized synagogue. It may or may not offer the communal services of a synagogue.

Shtiebels were common in Jewish communities in Eastern Europe before the Holocaust. The shtiebel was distinctly characteristic of Hasidic Judaism and played a central and critical role in the life of the Hasidic community. Shtiebels continue to exist in contemporary Israel and the United States.

== History: In Europe ==
Shtiebels traditionally served as places for prayer and community gatherings, often centered around a prominent Hasidic rebbe.The shtiebel was cost-effective, helping to spread Hasidism through a grassroots movement that enabled those familiar with it to establish local communities. This allowed Hasidism to reach more areas throughout the 18th and 19th centuries. They hosted the seudah shlishit, the ritual third meal of Shabbat, and attracted newcomers with their inviting atmosphere for prayer, eating, drinking, and community activities.

== In Israel ==
In Israel, minyans are held in storefront shtiebelekh in major business areas around the clock; whenever ten individuals show up, a new minyan begins. The Zichron Moshe shtiebel in the Zikhron Moshe neighborhood of Jerusalem (near Geula) is located in a proper synagogue, with many rooms for round-the-clock minyans. This shtiebel is well known as the locale of Friday-night mussar talks that Rabbi Sholom Schwadron, the "Maggid of Jerusalem," delivered for more than 40 years.

In the ultra-Orthodox community in Israel, synagogues developed in which several rooms (shtibelekh) were concentrated on prayer minyanim. The purpose of the shtibelekh is to allow a parallel prayer place and a more liberated atmosphere. Unlike a synagogue with regular prayer times, certain seating arrangements, and the like, the shtibelekh operates at all hours of the day and routinely includes temporary worshipers. An example is the Itzkovitch Synagogue, Bnei Brak.
