= Gamliel Rabinowitz =

Rabbi Gamliel Rabinowitz גמליאל רבינוביץ
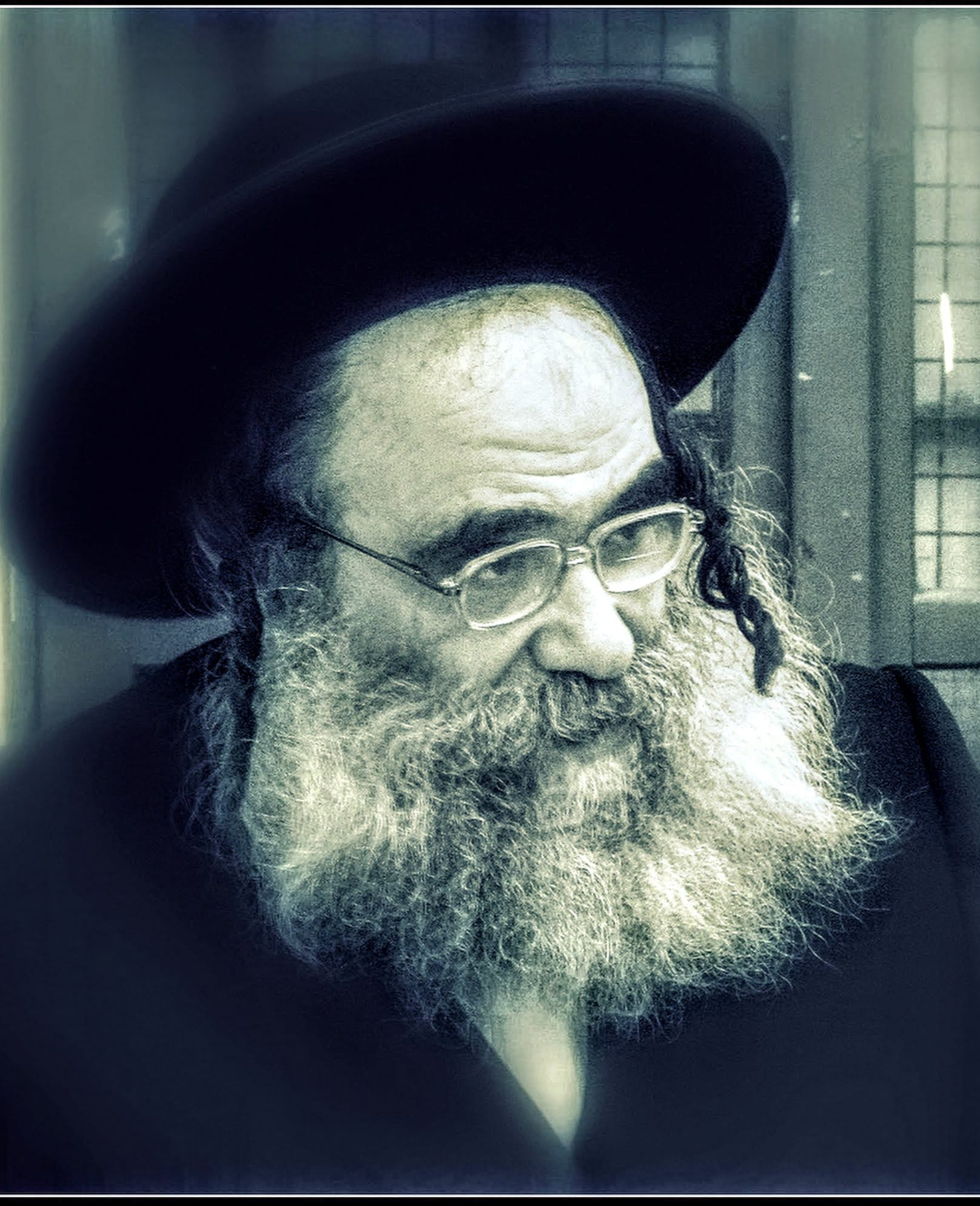

Personal life
- Born: 1949 (age 76–77)
- Parent(s): Rabbi Levi Rabinowitz; Michla Zilber

Religious life
- Religion: Judaism
- Denomination: Orthodox
- Yeshiva: Shaar Hashamayim Yeshiva
- Position: Rosh Yeshiva
- Residence: Jerusalem

Gamliel HaKohen Rabinowitz (Rappaport) (Hebrew: גמליאל הכהן רבינוביץ (רפפורט)) is a rosh yeshiva of Shaar Hashamayim Yeshiva in Jerusalem, Israel. He is a recognized expert in Jewish Law and Kabbalah.

== Family ==
Rabinowitz is the son of Rabbi Levi HaKohen Rabinowitz (1920-2015), author of Maadanei Hashulchan and Maadanei Malakhim, and grandson of Rabbi Gamliel Rabinowitz, a rosh yeshiva in Kishinev and posek in the court of the Chortkover Rebbe, Rabbi Dovid Moshe Friedman. His family possesses rare documentation attesting to their status as Kohanim, tracing their ancestry back to the Shach. The family surname was originally Rappaport; the name was changed in response to a Russian government decree that conscripted all second sons for the Imperial Russian Army.

== Personal ==
He resides in the Zikhron Moshe neighborhood of Jerusalem.

== Published works ==
- Tiv HaTehillos: The Essence of Praises (in English and Hebrew). Feldheim Publishers. 2005. ISBN 978-1-58330-827-1.
- Tiv HaTeshuva (in Hebrew).
- Tiv HaKavanos (in Hebrew). Jerusalem, Israel: Machon Shaarei Ziv. - Commentary on the kavanah of saying Shema Yisroel.
- Tiv HaHisorerus Al Chag HaPesach (in Hebrew). Jerusalem, Israel: Machon Shaarei Ziv. 2006.
- Tiv HaPurim (in Hebrew). - Commentary on Purim
- Tiv HaTorah (in Hebrew). - Commentary on the Torah
