= Kol Torah =

Yeshiva in Jerusalem

Coordinates: 31°46′0.79″N 35°10′57.69″E

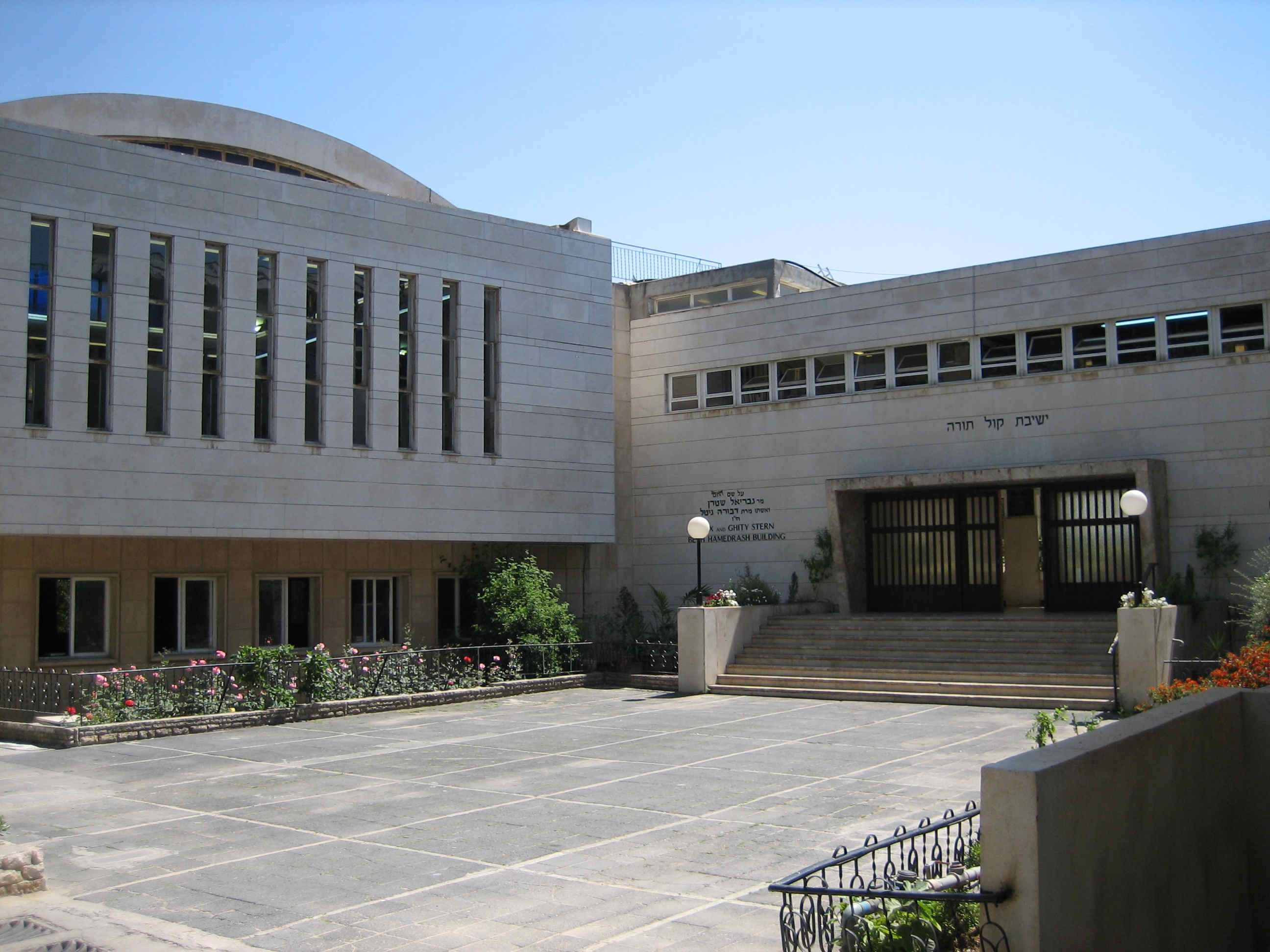
Main entrance to Kol Torah

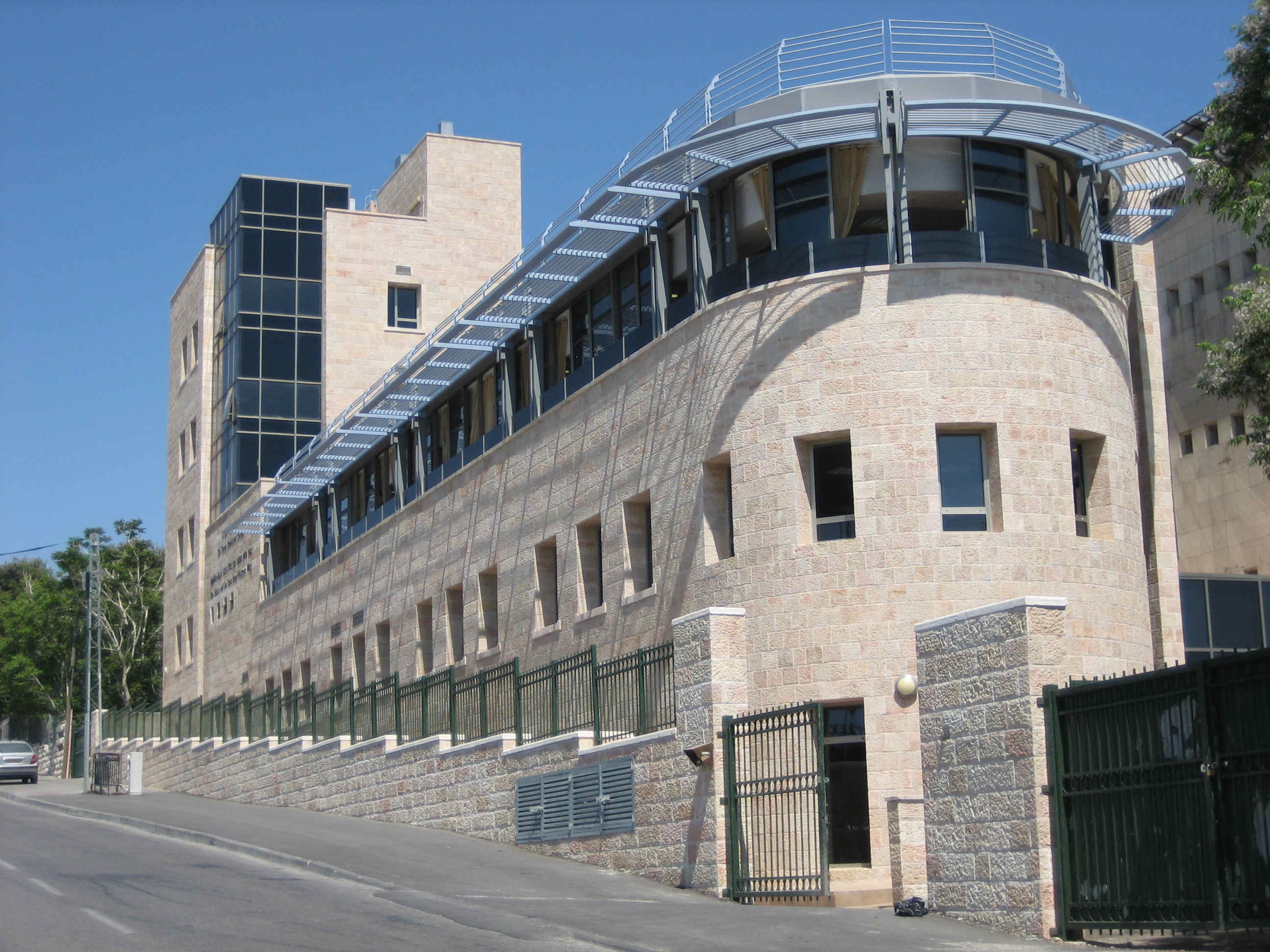
New wing of Kol Torah

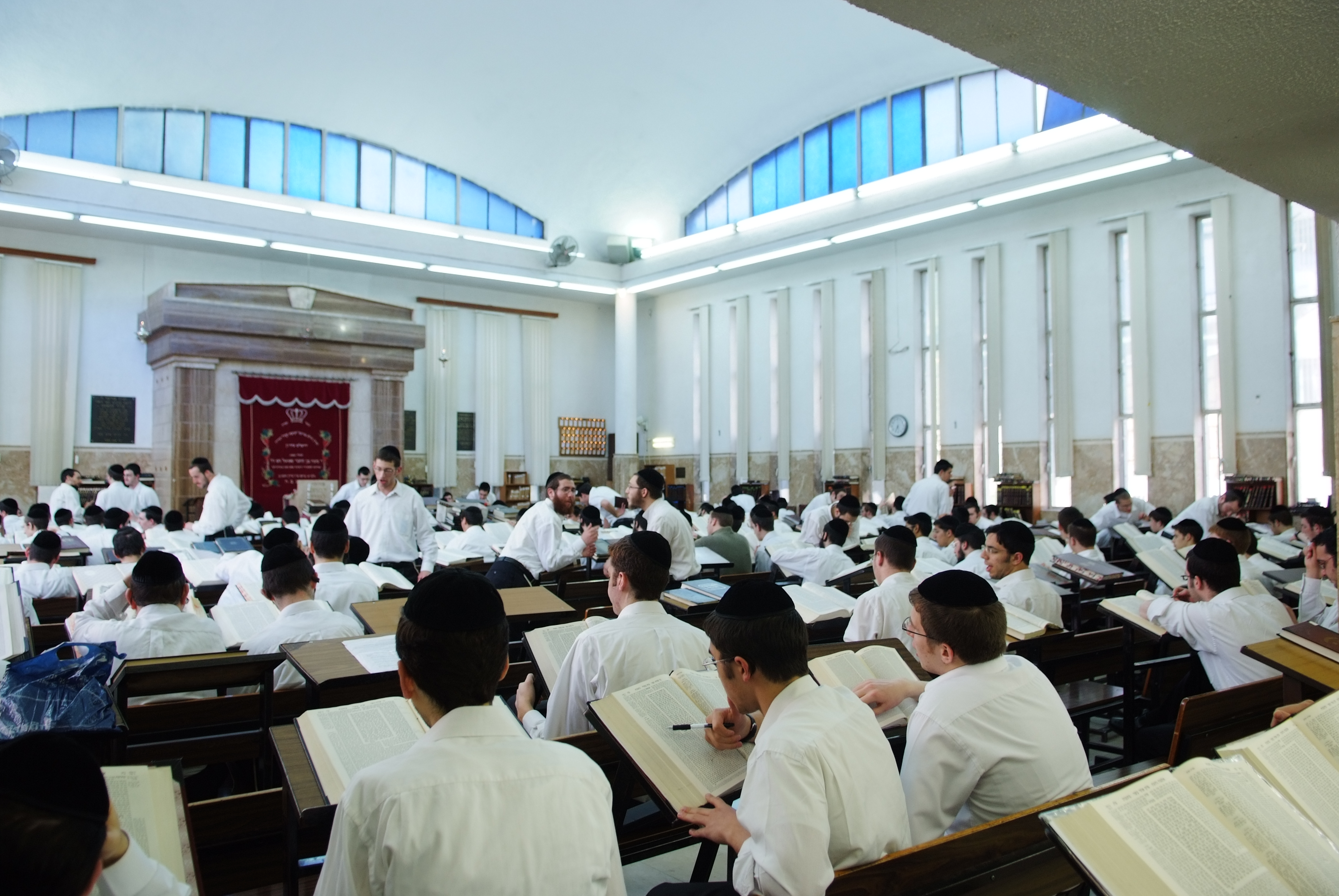
Bet Midrash

Kol Torah is a yeshiva in the Bayit Vegan neighborhood of Jerusalem.

== History ==
Yeshivas Kol Torah was founded in 1939 by Yechiel Michel Schlesinger (1898–1948), born in Hamburg, Germany and Boruch Kunstadt, a dayan from Fulda, Germany. It was the first mainstream Haredi yeshiva to teach in Hebrew, as opposed to Yiddish, as was accepted at the time. This innovation had the crucial support of the Chazon Ish.

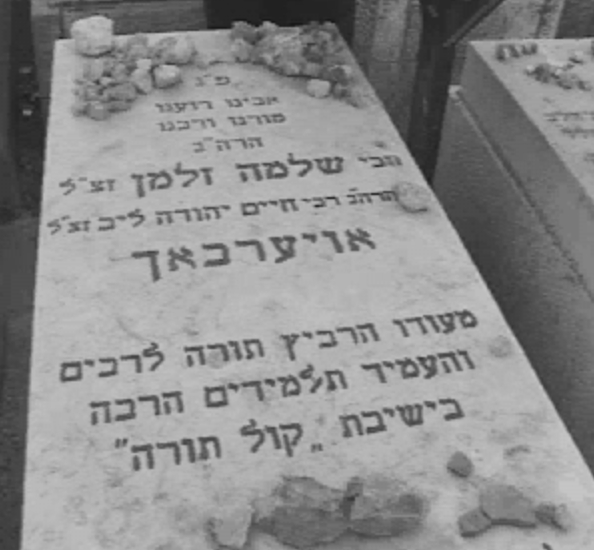
Tombstone of Rabbi Shlomo Zalman Auerbach; the inscription reads in part: "From a young age he spread Torah among the public, and had many students in Yeshivas Kol Torah".

After Schlesinger's death in 1949, Kol Torah was headed by Shlomo Zalman Auerbach, until his death in 1995.

Moshe Yehuda Schlesinger, eldest son of the founder, is currently serving as rosh yeshiva. Kol Torah is separated into two parts, the rabbinical college and the high school. The number of students in both combined reaches around 1000 students.

== Notable faculty members ==
- Yitzchok Yerucham Bordiansky, son in law of Shlomo Zalman Auerbach.
- Boruch Shmuel Deutsch, chief disciple of Elazar Shach and Jerusalem Faction leader.
- Avrohom Erlanger, author of Birkas Avrohom.
- Dovid Hecksher (1943–1997).
- Yehoshua Neuwirth (1927-2013), author of Shemirat Shabbat Kehilchatah.

== Notable alumni ==
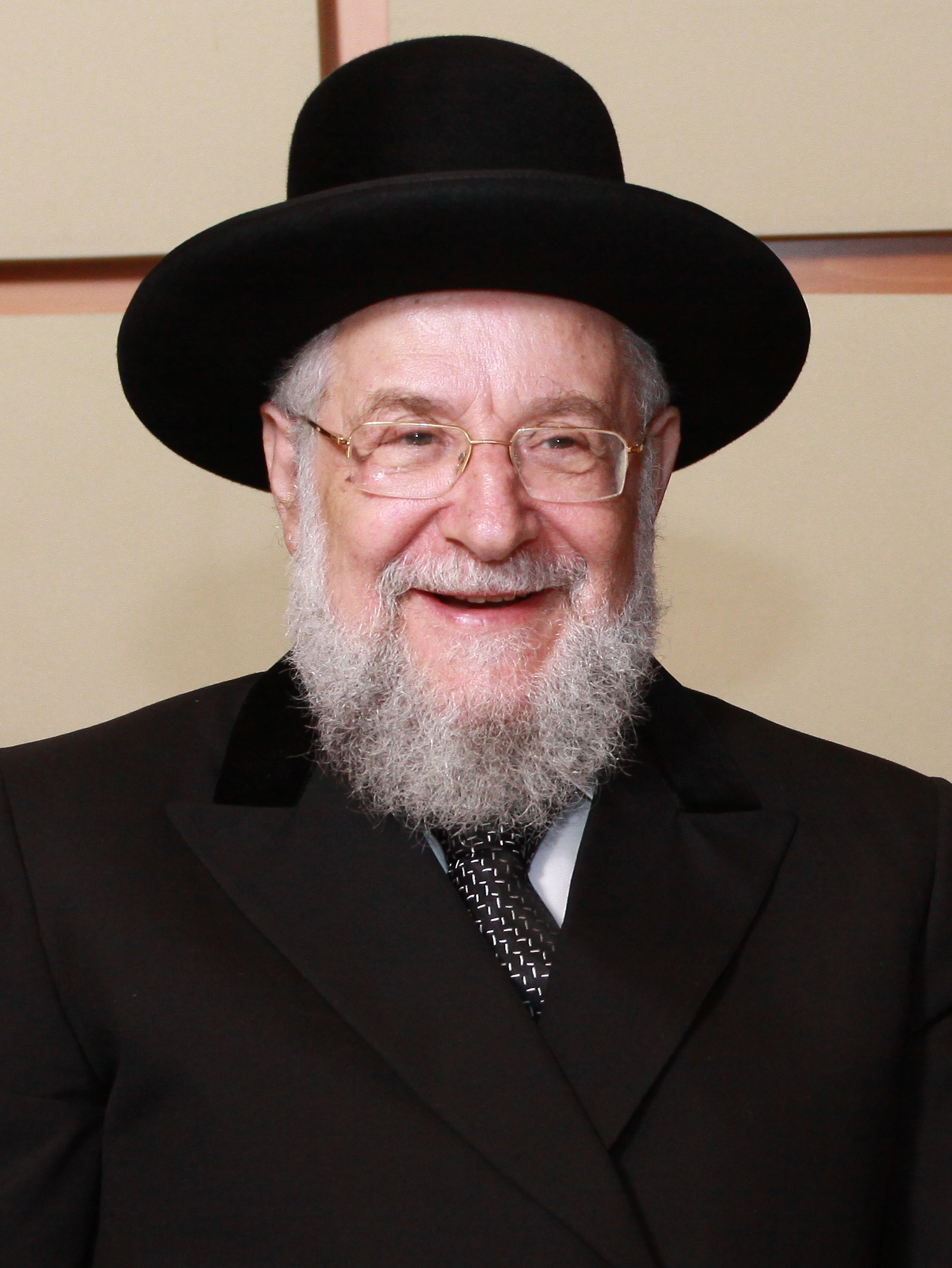
Israel Meir Lau

- Pinchas Biberfeld (1915–1999), Chief Rabbi of Munich.
- Meir Kessler, rabbi of Modi'in Illit.
- Israel Meir Lau (born 1937), Ashkenazi Chief Rabbi of Israel (1993–2003).
- Norman Lebrecht (born 1948), British commentator on music and cultural affairs, and novelist.
- Nachum Neriya (born 1941), son of Moshe-Zvi Neria and founder of Torah Betziyon.
- Yehoshua Neuwirth (1927 - 2013), author of Shemirat Shabbat Kehilchatah.
- Shmuel Rabinovitch (born 1970), rabbi of the Western Wall and the Holy Sites of Israel.
- Daniel Sperber (born 1940), Professor of Talmud at Bar-Ilan University.
- Chaim Walder (1968-2021), author of Haredi children's literature who committed suicide after a rabbinical court concluded he had sexually abused dozens of women, girls, and boys.
- Yitzhak Shlomo Zilberman (1929-2001), founder of Yeshivat Aderet Eliyahu; pioneer of the Zilberman Method in Jewish education.
