= Mordechai Leib Kaminetzky =

Hareidi rabbi in Sha'arei Hesed, Jerusalem

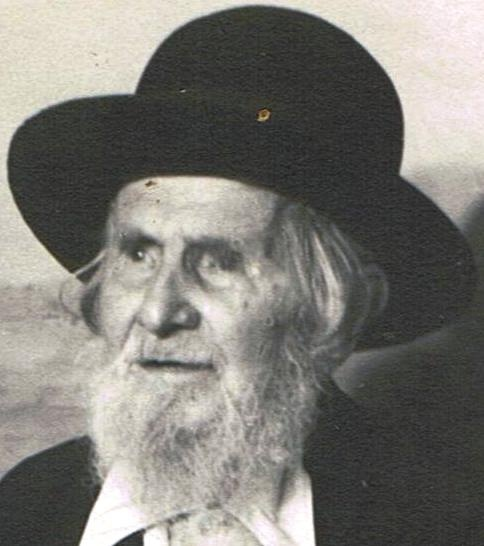

Personal life
- Born: Mordechai Leib Kaminetzky מרדכי לייב קמינצקי; 1859 Drahichyn, Brest, Belarus
- Died: 1955 (aged 95–96) Jerusalem
- Buried: Har HaMenuchot

Religious life
- Religion: Judaism
- Denomination: Haredi

Mordechai Leib Kaminetzky (Hebrew: מרדכי לייב קמינצקי; 1859–1955) was a Hareidi rabbi in Sha'arei Hesed, Jerusalem who served as a teacher in the Etz Chaim Yeshiva.

== Birth ==
Rabbi Mordechai Leib was born in Drahichyn, Belarus to Rabbi Zev Menachem Mendel and Chaya Basha Kaminetzky in the year 1859. Rabbi Mendel was the author of the book 'Emek Pashut'.

== Novardok ==
In the year 1914, on his way to Jerusalem, Rabbi Mordechai Leib was offered the position of the Mashgiach ruchani of Novardok Yeshiva by Rabbi Yosef Yozel Horwitz, the 'Alter', who offered to split the responsibility as Alter of Novardok.

== In Jerusalem ==
Rabbi Mordechai Leib moved to Israel in the year 1914 with his wife and son. He became a rabbi in Etz Chaim Yeshiva and served there until 1930. He was the rebbi of Rabbi Shlomo Zalman Auerbach. Also close to him were Rabbi Shalom Schwadron and Rabbi Yitzchak Shlomo Zilberman. Rabbi Mordechai Leib was also the close friend of Rabbi Yaakov Moshe Charlap of Sha'arei Hesed. Rabbi Charlap would study Kabbalah with Rabbi Mordechai Leib.

== Death ==
Rabbi Mordechai Leib died on July 21, 1955, in Sha'arei Hesed at the age of 96. He was eulogized by Rabbi Shalom Schwadron and Rabbi Shlomo Zalman Auerbach. He was buried on Har Hamenuchot.
