= Charlap =

Charlap is a surname. Notable people with the surname include:

- Bill Charlap (born 1966), American jazz pianist
- Moose Charlap (1928–1974), American Broadway composer
- Yaakov Moshe Charlap (1882–1951), Orthodox rabbi
