= Yehoshua Menachem Ehrenberg =

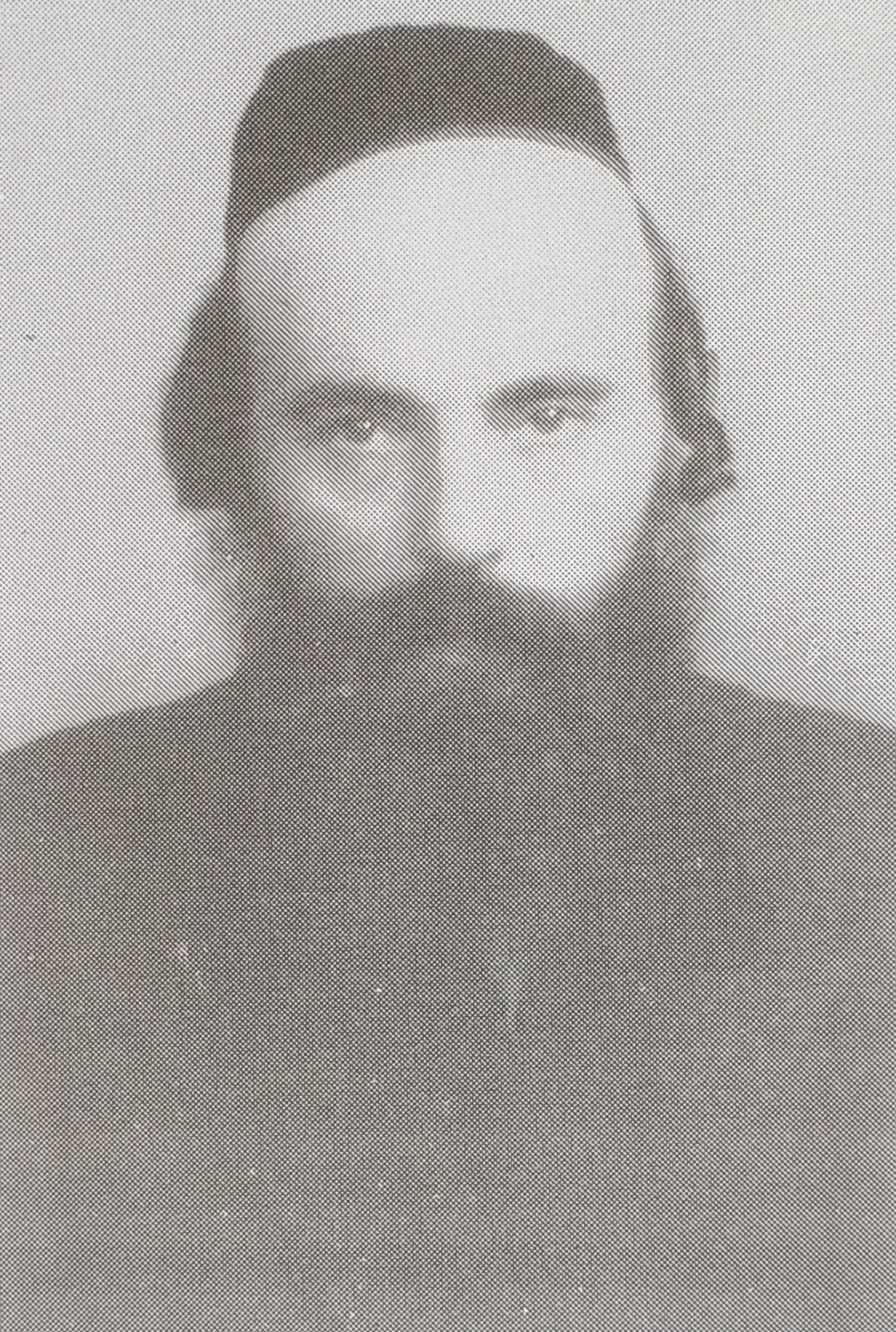
Yehoshua Menachem Ehrenberg

Yehoshua Menachem-Mendel Ehrenberg (December 20, 1904 – March 26, 1976) was a Hasidic rabbi, halakhic decisor, and head of the rabbinical court in Tel Aviv. He served as chief rabbi in the detention camps in Cyprus.

== Biography ==
He was born in the town of Kemecse in Hungary to Yitzchak-Aryeh Leib and Sarah Ehrenberg, who were originally from Görlitz in Galicia. In his youth he studied under Naftali Hertz Bombach, head of the rabbinical court of Sambor and author of the work Giv'at HaLevonah, and afterward under Meir Arik, head of the rabbinical court of Torna, who also ordained him for the rabbinate. He was likewise ordained for the rabbinate by Jacob Horowitz of Probizhna and Samuel Firer of Krosno, among others.

In 1925, he married Hinda-Leah Birnbaum of Kraków (one of the first students of Sarah Schenirer), where he continued his studies. During the Holocaust, he was imprisoned in the Bochnia ghetto and managed to escape to Slovakia and from there to Hungary. Ehrenberg and his two daughters were among the survivors of the "Kastner Train," by means of which they arrived in 1944 in Switzerland, where they were housed in a hotel that had been converted into a refugee accommodation facility in the town of Caux. Like most of the train's survivors, he immigrated to Mandatory Palestine in September 1945 and settled in Jerusalem. His daughter Sarah married the Hasidic communal figure Yechezkel Shraga Frankel and his daughter Riva married Avraham Chanoch Abramowitz, son of the Agudist communal figure Yehuda Meir Abramowitz. Many of the halakhic responsa he published in Devar Yehoshua deal with halakhic questions relating to the Holocaust.

In 1947, he was asked by Yitzhak Herzog to serve as chief rabbi in the detention camps in Cyprus. He remained in Cyprus until the camps were dissolved, and there he was occupied primarily with matters of personal status and agunot. He also founded a yeshiva there in which approximately eighty young men studied.

Upon the dissolution of the camps in Cyprus in 1949, he returned to Israel and was appointed head of the rabbinical court in Jaffa and later Tel Aviv. He was well-versed in all areas of halakha, but was primarily renowned for his expertise in the laws of Even HaEzer (personal status). In this area he served as an advisor to Isser Yehuda Unterman. He was a member of the Belz Hasidic dynasty, and was counted among the most distinguished figures of the movement and among the prominent close associates of the rebbe, Yissachar Dov Rokeach.

In 1961, he sat on the Israeli rabbinical council which permitted Jewish marriage to the Bene Israel.

He passed away on the eve of Shabbat, and his funeral was held on Motza'ei Shabbat in Tel Aviv and in Jerusalem. At his funeral he was eulogized by Rokeach in the hall of the Belz yeshiva on Agrippas Street in Jerusalem. He was brought to burial on the Mount of Olives.

== Works ==
- Devar Yehoshua: Shu"t. Vol. I (1970), Vol. II (1974).

=== Posthumous ===
- Devar Yehoshua: Shu"t. Vol. III (1976), Vol. IV (1987), Vol. V-VI and Index (1998).
- Piskei Devar Yehoshua (1995).
- "The Prohibition of Transferring the Territories of the Land of Israel to non-Jews” (1989). Tehumin (in Hebrew). 10: 26–33.
- "The Validity of the 'Rotation' Agreement" (1996). Pa'amei yaakov (in Hebrew). 35: 31–39.
- Derush lehodesh nissan (2004).
- Devar Yehoshua al haShas (2019).

=== Lost ===
- Rashei Vesamim on the Rokeach (1936).

== Sources ==
- G. L. (April 6, 1950). "Rabbi Yehoshua Menachem Ehrenberg". HaTzofe (in Hebrew). p. 3.
- Frankel, Yehezkel Shraga; Erlich, Dov Asher Zelig, Abramowitz, Avraham Hanoch (1976). "Introduction". Devar Yehoshua: Shu"t (in Hebrew). Vol. III (1976). Unpaginated.
- Sorasky, Aaron (1989). "The gaon of Krakow". Marbitzei Torah in the Hasidic World (in Hebrew). Vol. VIII. pp. 146–179
- "Rabbi Yehoshua Menachem-Mendel Ehrenberg" (1996). Pa'amei yaakov (in Hebrew). 35: 30.
