= Zomet Institute =

Israeli high-tech non-profit organization

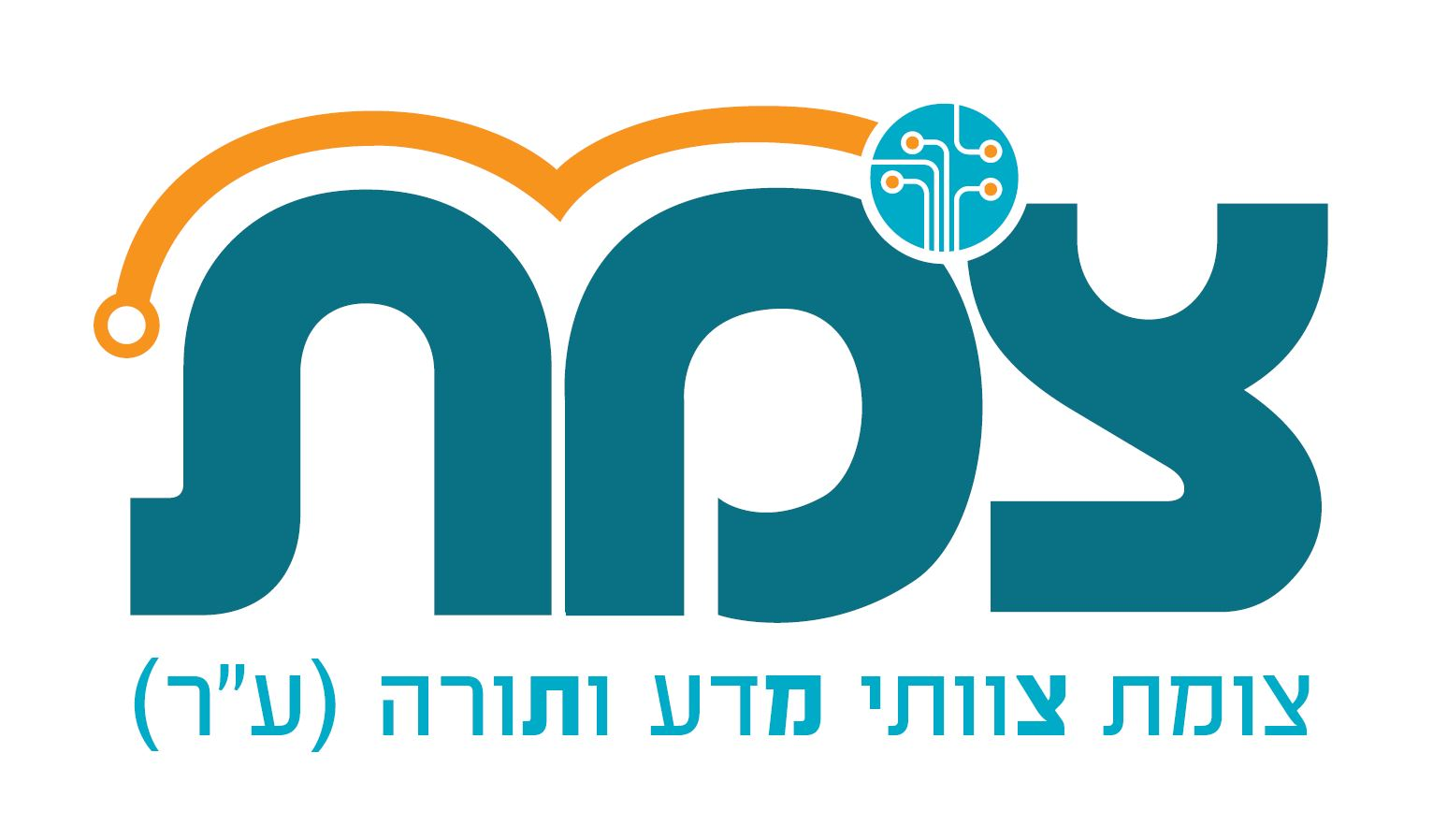
- Founded: 1977
- Founder: Rabbi Yisrael Rozen
- Purpose: Halakha, Technology, Medicine
- Location: Alon Shvut, West Bank
- Region served: Global
- Method: Research & development of halachicly compliant technology.
- head: Menachem Perl
- Website: www.zomet.org.il/eng/

The Zomet Institute (Hebrew: מכון צומת, Makhon Tzomet, Tzomet being an acronym for Tzevtei Mada veTorah (Hebrew: צוותי מדע ותורה), lit. Teams of Science and Torah) is an Israeli high-tech non-profit organization specializing in IT equipment and electronic appliances designed to meet Halakha.

== The company ==
The Zomet Institute was established in Alon Shvut by Yisrael Rosen (1941-2017), who also founded and headed the Administration of Conversion to Judaism of the Chief Rabbinate of Israel. Later, he served as a Dayan - Rabbinic Judge on the Beit Din for Conversion. Following the passing of Rosen, Rabbi Menachem Perl succeeded him as head of the institute.

The company has developed solutions for operating electrical appliances on the Shabbat and other Jewish holidays. Appliances made by the institute are used in Jewish observant homes, as well as in public organizations such as hospitals, the Israel Police and the Israel Defense Forces.

Although the Zomet Institute is affiliated with Modern Orthodox Judaism, Rozen often consults other rabbis and his halachic rulings have received endorsements from authorities including the rabbis Shlomo Zalman Auerbach and Yehoshua Neuwirth.

== See also ==
Sabbath Mode - For features implemented with the same goal by manufacturers not necessarily associated with Zomet.

== Publications ==
- Tehumin - an annual compilation of psakim (religious rulings dealing with modern Jewish life, technology and law). Published since 1980 (5740)
- Crossroads: Halacha and the Modern World - An English translation of Selected articles from Tehumin
- Shabbat B'Shabbato - A weekly leaflet in Hebrew distributed for the past two decades in synagogues across Israel. Shabbat B'Shabbato is also translated into English.
