= Yisrael Rosen =

Israeli rabbi (1941–2017)

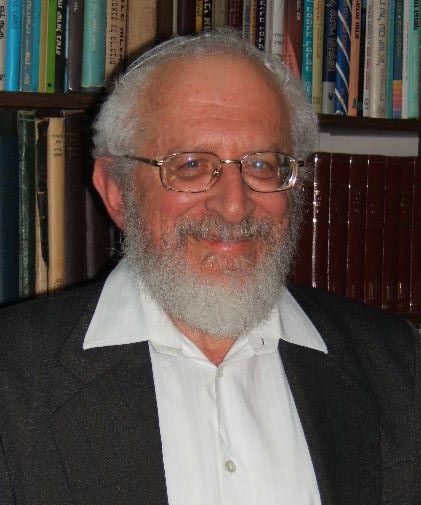
Yisrael Rozen

Yisrael Rosen (Hebrew: ישראל רוזן; 1941 – November 1, 2017) was an Orthodox Israeli rabbi. He founded the office for conversion to Judaism in the Chief Rabbinate of Israel and he was a judge there. He was also director of the Zomet Institute for the interface of halakhah and technology and the editor-in-chief of the annual journal Techumin published by that institute. He edited the weekly newsletter Shabbat B'Shabbato and wrote a weekly column therein. He wrote commentaries about the Rabbinic interpretations of Tanakh (the Hebrew Bible).

== Biography ==
Rabbi Rosen was born in Tel Aviv, learned in Yeshivat HaYishuv HeHadash and in Kerem BeYavneh, and founded the kollel in KBY. Afterward he studied electronics in Machon Lev and in Bar-Ilan University. Rozen lived in Alon Shevut and was married with five children.

Rosen was active in many areas. He helped implement technological innovations for halakhic observance at the Zomet Institute. These devices apply halakhic concepts to technological devices, mostly electronics, to enable using them within the rules of halakhah. He also wrote and published articles on Tanakh. His positions tended to be conservative both politically and religiously.

In April 2008, Rosen was awarded the Lev Prize by Machon Lev for outstanding achievement in Torah Umadda.

In November 2008, Rosen won a libel lawsuit against Yated Ne'eman (Israel) after the rabbinic board of Yated Ne'eman instructed its editors to slander him. Yated Ne'eman falsely claimed that the rabbi provided halakhic certification out of the desire for money.

On the occasion of Pope Benedict XVI's 2009 pilgrimage to Israel, Rosen's far-from-endearing message to the Pope was that Jesus was a false messiah who deserved to die, but Catholics could be utilized to help Israel fight a war against fundamentalist Islam.

In August 2017, Rosen, who served as member of The Jewish Home political party presidium, resigned from the party in protest of party's chairman Naftali Bennett employing a lesbian spokesperson.

Rosen died on November 1, 2017 (13 Marcheshvan 5778).

== Publications ==
=== Books (Hebrew) ===
- ספר שופטים בגובה חז"ל
- אתרי סגולה בגובה חז"ל

=== Articles (Hebrew) ===
- בין שופטים לשמואל, מגדים ב'
- על שאול ועמלק ועל 'חדשנות הלכתית', מגדים י'
- דבורה וברק: זוג שופטים 'הפכי', מגדים מ'
- יהדות ועולם - אמונה וטכנולוגיה, עיבוד מאמר שנדפס בחוברת "באור התורה"
- מאמרי הרב רוזן באתר "ישיבה"

== External links (Hebrew) ==
- שליפות עם הרב ישראל רוזן, באתר nrg יהדות
- כל הטורים של הרב ישראל רוזן, באתר ynet
- אתר מכון צומת, מכון מדעי תורני בראשות הרב ישראל רוזן
