= Bayit VeGan =

Western Jerusalem neighborhood

Bayit VeGan Hebrew: בית וגן
- Neighborhood
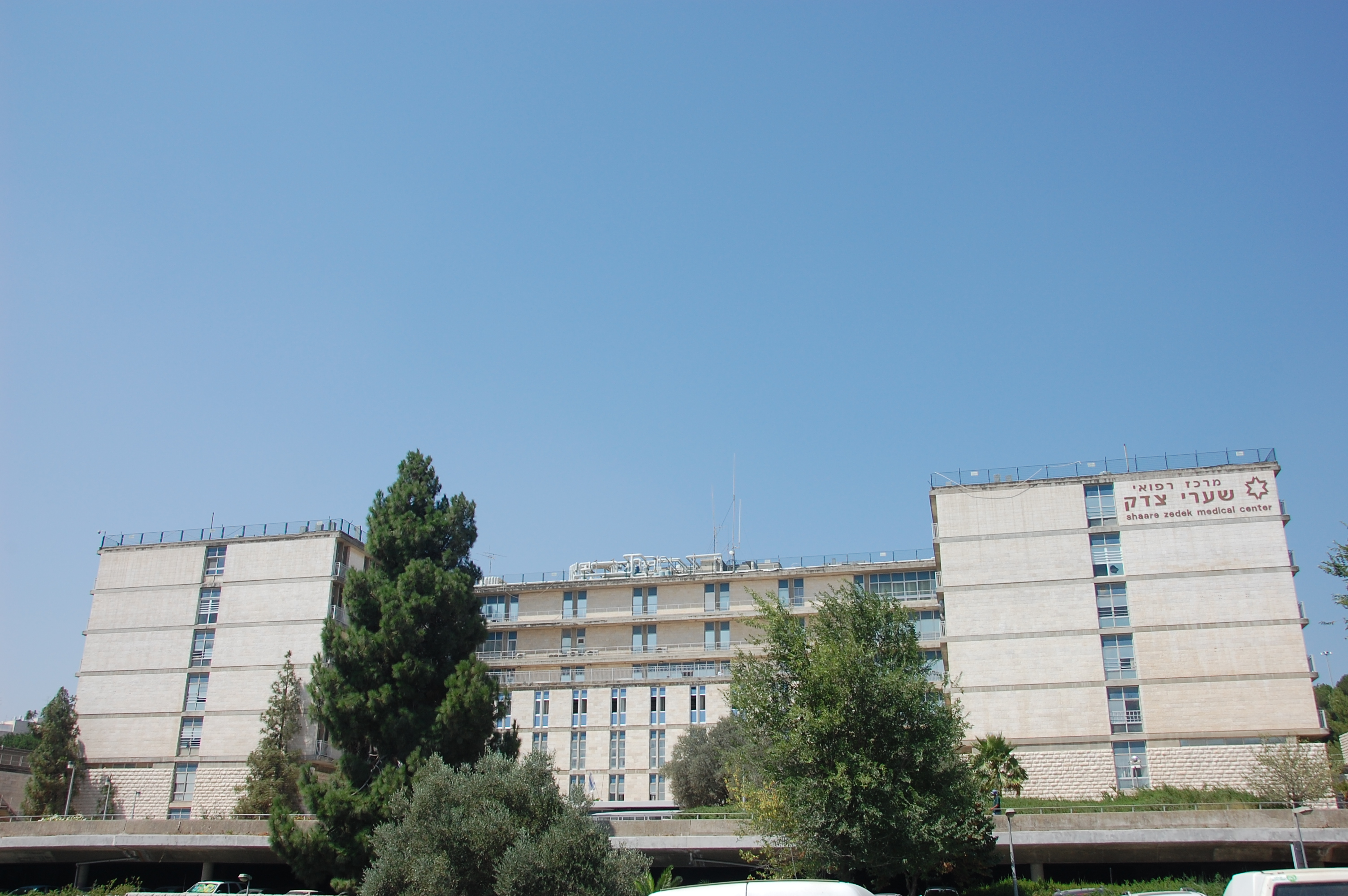
- Shaare Zedek Medical Center in Bayit VeGan
- Interactive map of Bayit VeGan
- Country: Israel
- District: Jerusalem District
- City: Jerusalem

Bayit VeGan (Hebrew: בית וגן, lit. House and Garden, also Bayit Vagan) is a neighborhood in southwest Jerusalem. It is located to the east of Mount Herzl, and borders the neighborhoods of Kiryat HaYovel and Givat Mordechai.

== History ==
=== Bronze Age ===
A 4,000-year-old cemetery and many Canaanite artifacts were discovered in an archeological dig at the edge of Bayit VeGan. The cemetery covers an area of more than half an acre (0.2 hectare), and burials are believed to have taken place there mainly in the Bronze Age, in 2200-2000 BCE and 1700-1600 BCE. Excavations began in 1995 but the most interesting finds were discovered in 2005.

=== Crusader period ===
The Orthodox monastery of Mar Saba owned a farmstead in this area in the 12th century, during the existence of the Catholic Kingdom of Jerusalem established by Crusaders.

=== British Mandate period ===
The Beit VeGan Association for establishing a religious-Zionist neighbourhood in western Jerusalem was founded in 1920. Among its leaders were Rabbi Yosef Mordechai Halevi, Rabbi Avraham-Haim Shag, Yerachmiel Amdursky, attorney Aharon Mani (of the Mani family), and Binyamin Kukia. The neighbourhood was initially planned to include 70 private homes, each with a private ornamental garden, similar to the garden neighbourhood of Beit HaKerem. Ultimately, 250 members joined the association, and the purchase of land from the surrounding villages of Ein Karem and Al-Malha began in 1921. Construction started in 1926, with 25 houses built on "Rabbi Kook Street" (now Beit VeGan Street), including the "Great Sephardic Synagogue."

In 1929, the "B'nai B'rith" neighbourhood was established by members of the B'nai B'rith organization at the highest point in the neighbourhood at the time (Beit VeGan Street 36–56), where a water tower was also constructed with the assistance of B'nai B'rith. One of the neighbourhood's founders and its first rabbi was Rabbi Shmuel Eliezeri, who was appointed in 1930.

At the time of its establishment, Beit VeGan was isolated from other Jerusalem neighbourhoods and formed the city's western boundary. The purchase of land for the neighbourhood was completed in 1932 when Yehuda Steinberg acquired land from the Aisha clan of Ein Karem at a site originally designated for the construction of a monastery.

During the British Mandate, the army built one of its radar stations in the neighborhood. A synagogue, Beit Knesset Migdal ("The Tower"), now stands on the spot.

Bayit VeGan was the third neighborhood built in West Jerusalem in modern times.

=== State of Israel ===
A scale-model of the Second Temple designed by Prof. Michael Avi-Yonah based on the writings of the Roman Jewish historian Josephus, was located for many years on the grounds of the Holyland Hotel in Bayit VeGan. In 2007, it was moved to the Israel Museum.

== Schools and Jewish religious institutions ==
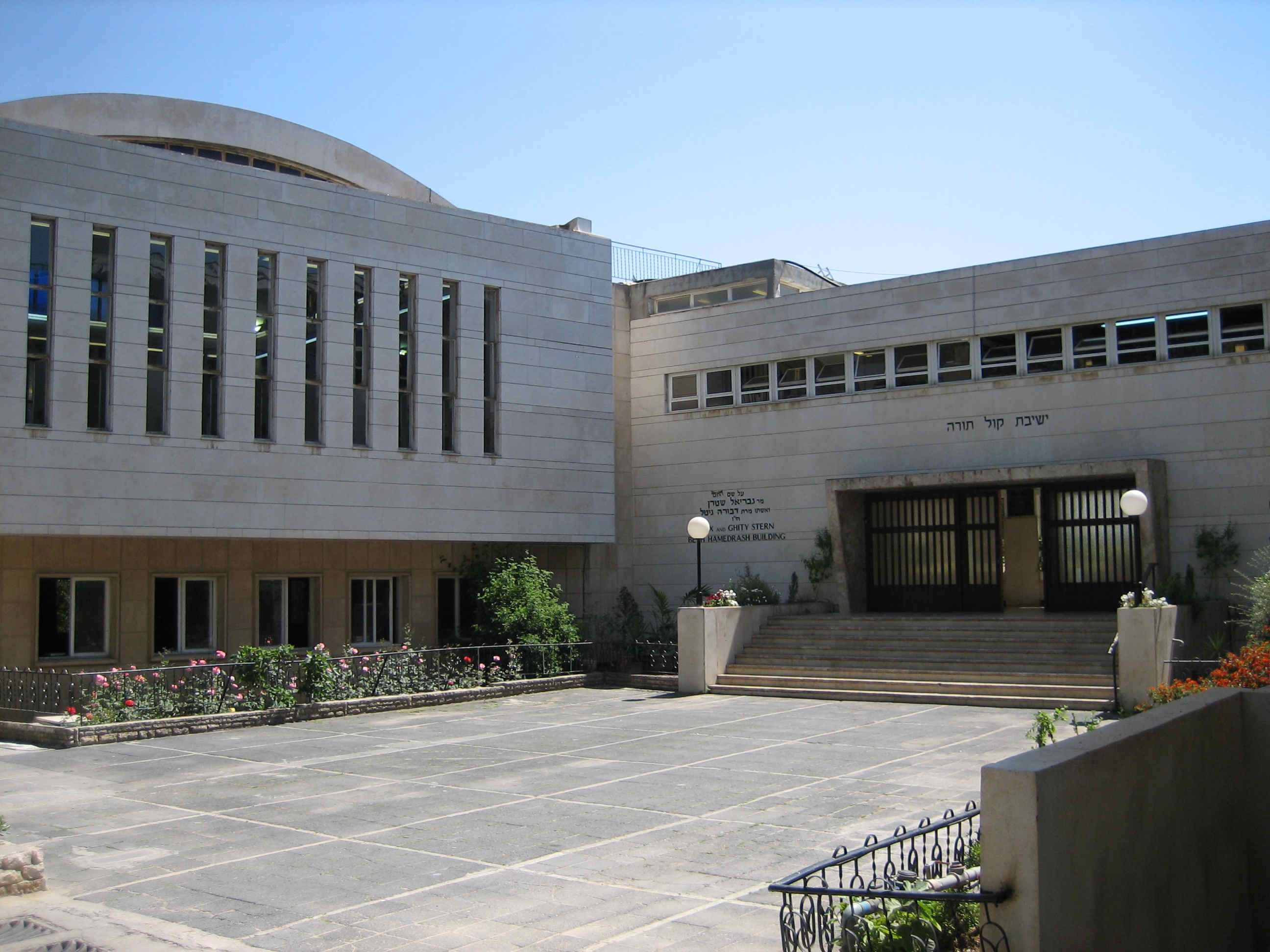
Kol Torah in Bayit VeGan

Many schools and Jewish religious institutions are located in the neighborhood, among them Ateret Yisrael Yeshiva, Kol Torah Yeshiva, Netivot Chochma Yeshiva, Yeshiva University's Gruss Kollel and Torat Tziyon program, Yeshivat Torat Shraga, Tiferet Yerushalayim, Michlalah-Jerusalem College for Women, Seminar Yerushalayim HaChadash, Yad Harav Herzog, Himmelfarb High School, Boys Town Jerusalem, and Netiv Meir Yeshiva High School. The Amshinover Rebbe has his court in Bayit VeGan, on Rabbi Frank Street. The Boyar School, a secular high school for gifted students from all over the country, is also located in Bayit VeGan.

== Medical facilities ==
Shaare Zedek Medical Center is located at the entrance to Bayit VeGan.

== Sports facilities ==
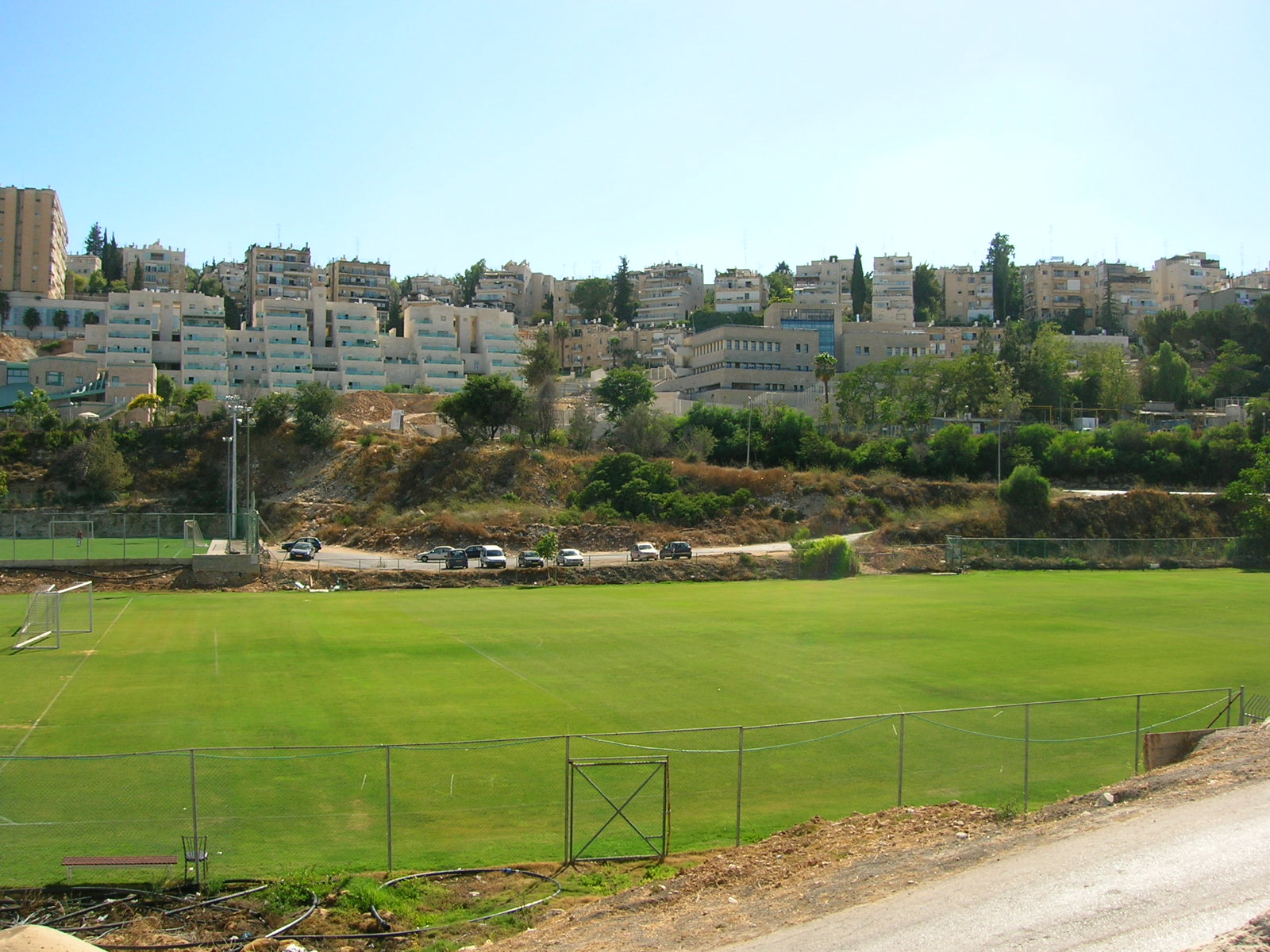
Beitar Jerusalem soccer field

The Beitar Jerusalem soccer club has a practice field in the neighborhood. Below the soccer field run its two tunnels for the new 16 route.

== Hotels and guesthouses ==
In recent years, a hotel by the name of Malon Hen (Hebrew: מלון חן lit. Hen Hotel) was built on the corner of Hapisga Street, and a youth hostel on the same street was upgraded to a guesthouse.

== Notable residents ==
- Yehoshua Neuwirth, rabbi
- Ezriel Auerbach, rabbi
- Ahuvah Gray, Baptist minister from the US who converted to Judaism
- Aryeh Deri, head of Shas party, several times minister, and member of Knesset
