= Hapeles =

Hebrew-language daily newspaper published in Jerusalem

- Mouthpiece of the Torah-world

- Front page of Hapeles, with reference to an English language article - "Build more jails"
- Type: Daily newspaper
- Format: Tabloid
- Editor: Natan Zeev Grossman
- Founded: 2012
- Political alignment: Jerusalem Faction
- Country: Israel

Hapeles (Hebrew: הפלס – The Leveler) is a Hebrew-language daily newspaper published in Jerusalem. Like other Haredi newspapers, it is not published on Shabbat (the Jewish Sabbath), but, instead, is put out as an expanded weekend edition.

Hapeles was founded through the encouragement of Shmuel Auerbach, leader of the Jerusalem Faction, an Israeli-Haredi political organisation.

== History ==
Hapeles is a continuation of the ideology underlying line adopted by the founders of the newspaper Yated Ne'eman. Yated Ne'eman was part of a broad initiative to create communal organizations to serve the Lithuanian Torah community. Yated Ne'eman rejected secular life and displayed an ambivalent attitude towards the State of Israel and Zionism. They recognized them as a de facto political entity, but denied that Zionism was the destiny of the Jewish people. Instead the newspaper emphasized pious observance of the mitzvot of the Torah and Jewish law.

In 2012 the paper was taken over by more moderate ultra-Orthodox elements. The CEO, the editor-in-chief and some of its guiding rabbinical board members (the "spiritual committee"), who were considered to represent the more strict ideological line, were fired during the changes. Hapeles was created to continue the original direction of Yated Ne'eman. The dismissed CEO and chief editor were appointed to those positions on the new paper.

== Controversy ==
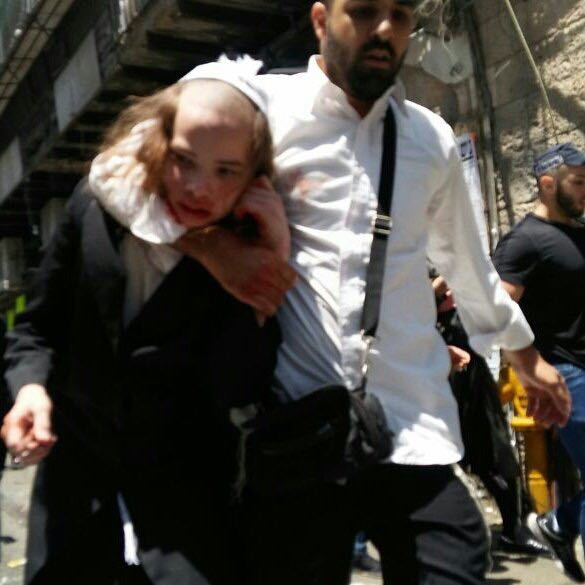
An undercover Israeli police officer arresting a Haredi child demonstrating against recruitment to IDF of yeshiva scholars. June, 2017

=== Campaign against recruitment of haredim ===
Hapeles leads an extensive campaign against recruitment of haredim to Israel Defense Forces. As a result, it faced criticism from the Israeli government, including Minister of Defense Avigdor Lieberman.

=== Suspicion of criminal activity ===
In April 2017, Hapeles editors were arrested and all the computers in the newspaper's HQ were confiscated. The charge was illegal efforts to get large companies in Israel to advertise in the newspaper. Jerusalem Faction protests against Haredi enlistment subsided for a few months as a result of the arrests, but Israeli Chief of Police Roni Alsheikh asserted that this was an unintended, though welcome, development. However, the newspaper claimed that the charges against it were indeed government persecution to silence its draft opposition campaign, citing controversial quotations of Eli Ben-Dahan, Israel's deputy minister of defence, as proof.
