= Yehoshua Neuwirth =

German-born Israeli rabbi (1927–2013)

Rabbi Yehoshua Yeshaya Neuwirth יהושע ישעיה נויברט
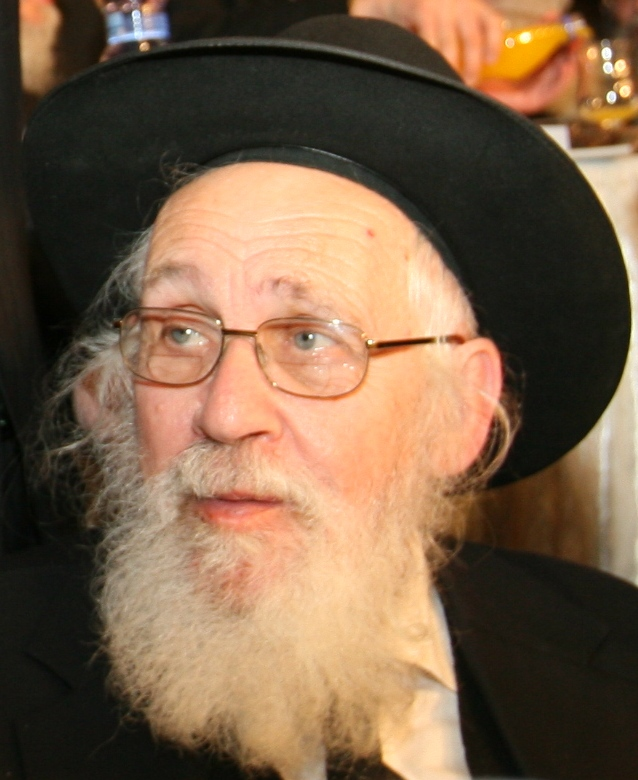
- Rabbi Yehoshua Yeshaya Neuwirth

Personal life
- Born: Yehoshua Yeshaya Neuwirth; February 15, 1927 Berlin, Germany
- Died: June 11, 2013 (aged 86) Jerusalem

Religious life
- Religion: Judaism
- Profession: Rabbi, posek
- Yeshiva: Chochmas Shlomo
- Position: Rosh yeshiva
- Yahrtzeit: 2 Tammuz, 5773

Yehoshua Yeshaya Neuwirth (Hebrew: יהושע ישעיה נויברט; 15 February 1927 – 11 June 2013) was an eminent Orthodox Jewish rabbi and posek (halakhic authority) in Jerusalem. He was one of the primary students of Rabbi Shlomo Zalman Auerbach and the author of a two-volume Hebrew language treatise, Shemirat Shabbat Kehilchatah — translated into English as Shemirath Shabbath: A practical guide to the observance of Shabbath — a compendium of the laws of Shabbat which is viewed by many as an authoritative work regarding these laws.

== Biography ==
Rabbi Neuwirth was born in Berlin, Germany. His father Aharon served as rabbi in a number of German communities. After Kristallnacht, he travelled to Belgium on the Kindertransport (children's convoy) but was rejoined by his parents in 1939. They settled in Amsterdam, the Netherlands. During the Second World War, the family lived in hiding, supported by the Resistance. Two of his brothers were killed. During this time, Neuwirth had little access to rabbinic literature, apart from the volume of the popular work Mishnah Berurah that deals with the Shabbat laws.

In 1946 he immigrated illegally to Palestine, and was detained at Atlit camp before being released and travelling to Jerusalem, where he was accepted at the Kol Torah yeshiva. While in Kol Torah, he became close to one of its lecturers, Rabbi Shlomo Zalman Auerbach.

== Rabbinic career ==
At Kol Torah Neuwirth wrote his best-known work on the Sabbath laws, entitled Shemirat Shabbat Kechilchatah. Later, he served as rosh yeshiva in three institutions: the yeshiva Nesivos Chochmah, the Pnei Shmuel yeshiva ketana and Chochmas Shlomo yeshiva gedola in Jerusalem. He also established the "Neuwirth Gemach". He lived in the Bayit Vegan neighborhood of Jerusalem. Neuwirth was a leading disciple of Rabbi Shlomo Zalman Auerbach. While Rabbi Auerbach issued most of his halachic rulings orally, Rabbi Neuwirth publicized many of his teacher's rulings on the laws of Shabbat in his book, first published in Hebrew in 1965. Additionally, 8 of the 32 chapters of this book were devoted to Rabbi Auerbach's rulings on medical halacha.

With the publication of his book, Rabbi Neuwirth introduced a new format for studying the laws of Shabbat. While previous texts for general reference were organized according to the presentation in the Shulchan Aruch, Neuwirth's was organised by topic and provided a clear index; he also embellished the presentation with thousands of references and comments. Feldheim Publishers published the first volume of the English-language translation in 1984; volumes 2-4 appeared in 1989, 1997, and 2001, respectively, and the current three-volume boxed set was issued in 2002.

Rabbi Neuwirth (left) with his Rav, Rabbi Shlomo Zalman Auerbach.

Widely regarded as an expert on Jewish law and medical ethics, Rabbi Neuwirth's opinion was frequently cited on issues such as genetic screening, brain death, euthanasia, and AIDS, as well as laws for physicians on Shabbat. He was also a consultant for the Zomet Institute, providing the halakhic authorization for innovations such as the Shabbat lamp and electric wheelchairs on Shabbat.

== Published works ==
- Chinukh Ha-Banim Le-Mitzvos Ve-Dinei Katan (Educating Children for Mitzvos and Laws of Youth) (Hebrew)
- The Halachoth of Educating Children
- Kitzur Dinei Shmita Karkaot (Concise Laws of Shmita)
- Shemirat Shabbat Kechilchatah (Hebrew), 1965 — translated into English as Shemirath Shabbath: A guide to the practical observance of Shabbath
