= Meir Kessler =

Israeli rabbi

Rabbi Meir Kessler מאיר קסלר
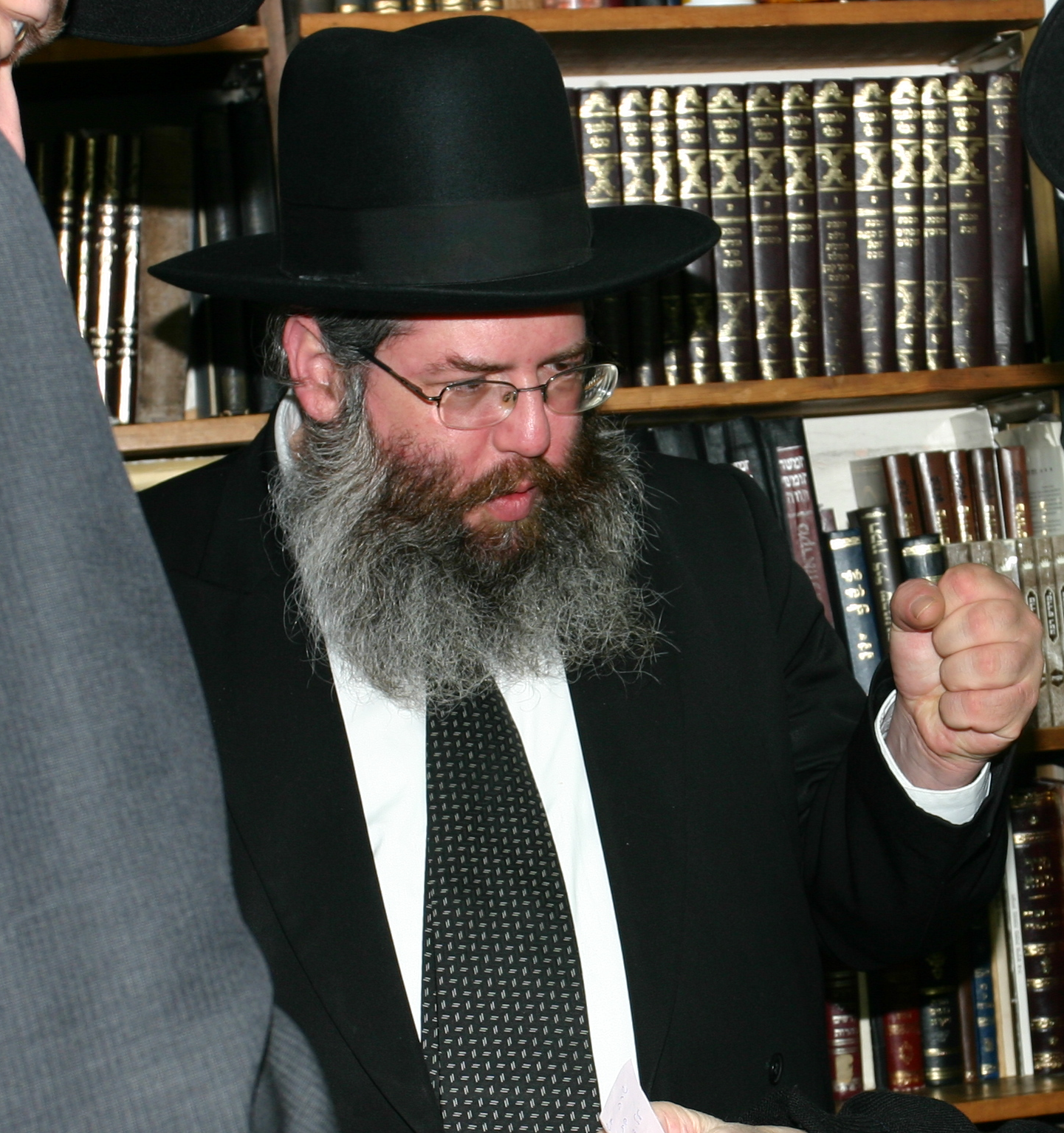

Personal life
- Born: February 17, 1961 (age 65) Bnei Brak

Religious life
- Religion: Judaism

Jewish leader
- Residence: Modi'in Illit

Meir Kessler (Hebrew: מאיר קסלר; born February 17, 1961) is the Chief Rabbi and head of Rabbinical Court of Modi'in Illit.

== Biography ==
He was born in Bnei Brak to Rabbi Simcha and Tova Gitel Kessler. He studied at the Ponevezh yeshiva and afterward at Kol Torah under Rabbi Shlomo Zalman Auerbach.

In 1981, he married Rachel, the daughter of Rabbi Yisrael Kleiner, head of Yeshivat Beit HaKerem. After his marriage, he moved to Jerusalem and continued his studies at the Brisk yeshiva under Rabbi Avrohom Yehoshua Soloveitchik. He later resided in the city of Hadera.

When his father died in June 1996, he succeeded him as the second rabbi of Modi'in Illit. Rabbi Kessler is also a member and activist in the Rabbinical Committee on Education, affiliated with the Council of Torah Sages, as well as the Rabbinical Committee on Communications.

His wife is an educator and writer. Under the pen name "Rachel Ben Menachem," she has published several books and stories in Zarkor magazine.

== Rulings ==
He prohibited yeshiva students from traveling on city buses during peak hours for reasons of modesty. He prohibited men studying in Kollel from volunteering for city security patrols and from possessing firearms. He also banned the use of content from the Haredi district in kindergartens and prohibited riding a bimba (ride-on toy) on Shabbat, among other rulings.
