= Magen Lacholeh =

Israel-based non-profit organization

- מגן לחולה
- Formation: 1991
- Founder: Rabbi Shlomo Zalman Auerbach
- Type: Non-governmental organization
- Legal status: Non-profit
- Purpose: Patient support and medical referral services
- Headquarters: Jerusalem, Israel
- Region served: Israel
- Services: Medical referrals, emergency hotline, counseling, ambulance services, medical equipment, advocacy
- Director: Rabbi Benjamin Fisher

Magen Lacholeh (Hebrew: מגן לחולה), Shield and Protector of the Sick, is a Jerusalem, Israel-based non-profit organization, created in 1991 to facilitate the link between patients and health professionals. It provides the knowledge, contacts, support and equipment that allow every patient to receive the right medical care.

The organization is headed by Rabbi Benjamin Fisher and operates six branches throughout Israel.

== Background ==
Magen Lacholeh was founded at the initiative of Rabbi Shlomo Zalman Auerbach, a renowned Rabbinical leader in the Jewish world. Rabbi Auerbach started the organization as he saw a need for guidance to those who seek medical attention. He envisioned an organization that helps patients find the best possible medical care by directing them to those health professionals who are the best suited to deal with their specific situation.

Magen Lacholeh's services are provided free of charge and without regard to religion. The organization is structured to provide emergency response in life-threatening situations and operates day and night.

== Services ==
- Medical Referral Hotline
- Emergency Hotline (24/7)
- Appointment Scheduling
- Counseling
- Ambulance Service
- Air ambulance and Surgery Abroad
- Medical Equipment
- Bureaucracy and Red Tape
- Advocacy
