= Ezriel Auerbach =

Israeli rabbi

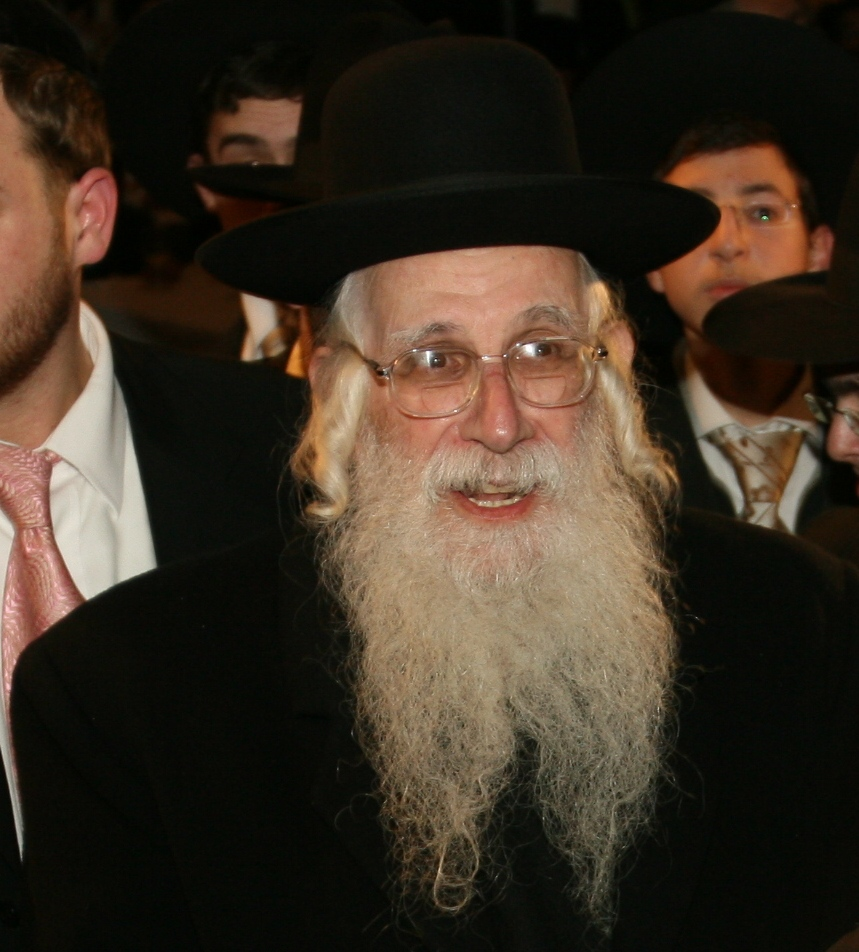
Rabbi Azriel Auerebach coming to the Conference Alumni of Yeshivas Kol Torah in 2007

Ezriel Auerbach (Hebrew: עזריאל אורבך; born 1937), also known as Azriel Auerbach, is a prominent Haredi rabbi and posek. He is the son of Rabbi Shlomo Zalman Auerbach, and son-in-law of Rabbi Yosef Shalom Elyashiv, two renowned poskim. He was considered Rabbi Elyashiv's right-hand man in matters of halakha. In late 2024, Auerbach was appointed head of the Jerusalem Faction.

Auerbach married Leah Elyashiv (1938–2010), daughter of Rabbi Elyashiv, in 1960. They had no children. On October 11, 2012, at the age of 75, Auerbach became engaged to Minna Elyashiv, age 58, the widow of Rabbi Avraham Elyashiv, grandson of Rabbi Yosef Shalom Elyashiv.

== Rulings ==
In matters of Halakhic dispute between Rabbi Shlomo Zalman Auerbach and Rabbi Elyashiv, apparently, Rabbi Ezriel Auerbach tends to rule privately in accordance with his father, while avoiding a public stand, in deference to his father-in-law.
