= Ariel Bareli =

Israeli rabbi (born 1970)

Ariel Bareli אריאל בראלי
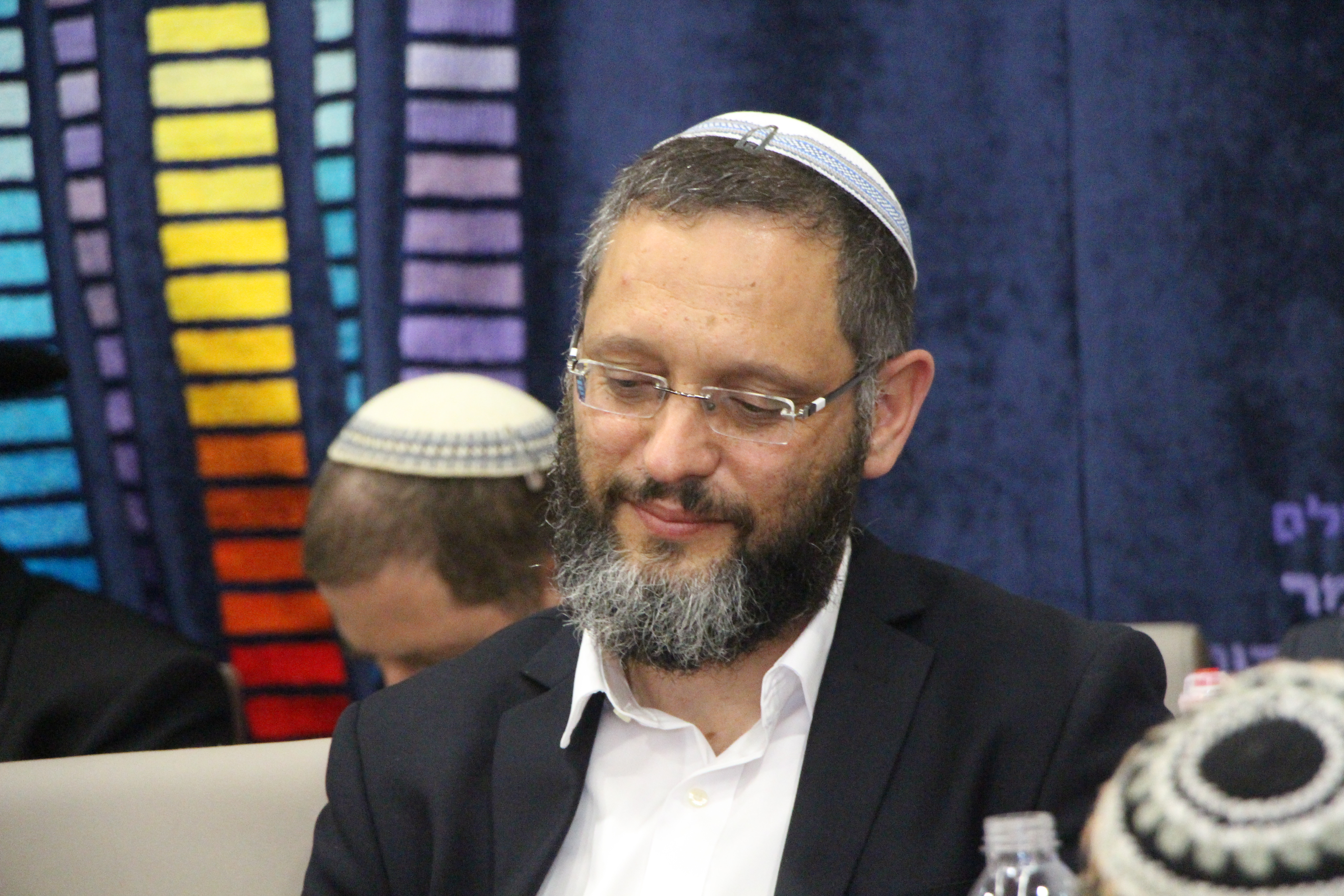

Personal life
- Born: June 14, 1970 (age 56) Jerusalem

Religious life
- Religion: Judaism

Ariel Bareli (Hebrew: אריאל בראלי; born June 14, 1970) is the rabbi of Beit El. He is the author of several books in Hebrew on monetary laws in halakha.

Previously he was an educator at the Hesder Yeshiva of Sderot.

He also served as the head of "Kolel Halacha" in Eilat and Dayan at the Conversion Court.

He was born in Jerusalem and studied under Rabbi Avraham Shapira.

His maternal grandfather was Rabbi Moshe-Zvi Neria.
