= Jerusalem Faction =

Israeli-Haredi political organization

The Jerusalem Faction (Hebrew: הפלג הירושלמי, romanized: HaPeleg HaYerushalmi, or simply Peleg Yerushalmi) is an Israeli Haredi political organization based in Jerusalem. It was founded in 2012 by Shmuel Auerbach as a reaction to the Bnei Brak-based Degel HaTorah's perceived moderate approach to the question of conscription of Haredim into the Israel Defence Forces by the Israeli government that came up following the expiration of the Tal Law.

The organization is known for its civil disobedience against Haredi conscription that takes the form of street demonstrations that often end in arrests. It has its own newspaper, Hapeles, and political party, Bnei Torah which has won city council seats in Jerusalem, Bnei Brak, and Modi'in Illit. It has been referred to as "hard-line" and "extremist".

== Background ==
=== Status quo agreement ===
The status quo agreement, agreed upon in the Knesset (Israeli parliament) informally between David Ben Gurion and the religious parties, granted draft exemptions to yeshiva students who qualified to the status of Torato Umanuto (lit. 'Torah is his trade'). The initial cap for this agreement was set at four hundred men per year, which was subsequently removed by Menachem Begin in 1977 after he won the premiership. Since then, the amount of exemptions has swelled to over one hundred times that number.

For many years, the Torato Umanuto arrangement had the status of a regulation under the jurisdiction of the Ministry of Defense (Prime Minister David Ben-Gurion also had the Defense portfolio). In 1998, the High Court of Justice (a role of the Supreme Court of Israel) ruled that the Defense minister had no authority to determine the extent of these exemptions. The Supreme Court postponed the application of the ruling to give the government time to resolve the matter.

=== Tal Law ===
In accordance with the judicial ruling, Prime Minister Ehud Barak set up the Tal committee in 1999. The committee reported its findings in April 2000, and its recommendations were approved by the Knesset in July 2002; the new "Tal Law", as it came to be known, was passed with 51 votes in favour and 41 against. The new law provided for a continuation of the Torato Umanuto arrangement under specific conditions laid down in the law, such as substituting a one-year civilian service, instead of the 3-year military conscription. It was hoped that the number of exemptions would gradually diminish. However, the new law did not put an end to controversies and disagreements.

In 2005, then-Justice Minister Tzipi Livni stated that the Tal Law, which by then had yet to be fully implemented, did not provide an adequate solution to the issue of Haredi conscription in Israel, as only 1,115 of the 41,450 yeshiva students covered by the arrangement had taken the "decision year" provided by the law, and of these, only 31 had later enlisted in the Israel Defense Forces (IDF). In 2007, the Tal Law was extended until August 2012. In January 2012, Ehud Barak, serving as Defense Minister, said his ministry was preparing an alternative to the Tal Law. Dozens of IDF reserve soldiers had put up what they called "the suckers' camp" near the Tel Aviv Savidor Central railway station, to protest the possible extension of the Tal Law. Several politicians, public figures, disabled IDF veterans, and high school and university students visited the protest encampment.

In February 2012, the High Court of Justice ruled that the Tal Law in its current form was unconstitutional, and could not be extended beyond August. Prime Minister Benjamin Netanyahu said that the government would formulate a new bill that would guarantee a more equal sharing of the burden by all parts of Israeli society. The issue was also part of a possible government collapse leading into the 2012-2013 election. In light of these events, in November 2012 Jerusalem Faction founder Shmuel Auerbach issued a memorandum to all yeshiva students asking them to refrain from reporting to the recruitment office until further notice, even if the purpose was only to receive a medical exam.

== History ==
The attitude of the Haredi community towards the outside world had historically been guided by the opinions of its gedolim (lit. 'great ones', rabbinical leaders) who, through their Da'as Torah, were able to create consensus. The death of Yosef Shalom Elyashiv in the critical year of 2012 created a power struggle among his successors, Aharon Leib Shteinman and Shmuel Auerbach, surrounding the draft controversy, with the former taking a more moderate approach, while the latter took a harder stance. In the end, Shteinman's leadership prevailed, which led to Auerbach's founding of the Jerusalem Faction as a protest movement. Following the death of founder Shmuel Auerbach on 24 February 2018, a group of twelve rabbis calling themselves Council of Sages of the Torah World convened in Auerbach's former home to plan the future of the Jerusalem Faction. In particular, two disciples of Degel HaTorah party founder Elazar Shach, dayan Tzvi Friedman of Bnei Brak and Baruch Shmuel Deutsch of Kol Torah yeshiva, appeared to have assumed joint decision-making responsibilities for the group. Yisrael Yitzchak Kalmanovitz and Ezriel Auerbach (brother of Shmuel) serve as ideological leaders.

== Politics ==
The Jerusalem Faction runs a political party, Bnei Torah (call letters in Hebrew: עץ, romanized: Etz). The party claims to be the political heir of Elazar Shach, whose Degel HaTorah party had in their view been compromised from its original principles. While the Faction also has a focus on threats to the Haredi education system, it mainly concerns itself with fomenting a strong opposition to the draft, which it deems a major threat to young Haredi men and women. The Faction created a Committee for Saving the Torah World to co-ordinate these activities, seeking to prevent any erosion of the status quo. In 2017, they reportedly represented 6.5% of the Haredi population.

Haim Epstein is a member of the Jerusalem city council on the Jerusalem Faction ticket. He ran for Mayor of Jerusalem in the 2018 election, but later withdrew. He ran again in the 2024 election.

Motti Babchik met with Haredi activists linked to the Jerusalem Faction in August 2026 to discuss forming a new party called "Black Ink" which would oppose the drafting of Haredi students into the IDF to compete in the 2026 Israeli legislative election.

== Publications ==
The Jerusalem Faction's official organ, Hapeles (lit. 'The Leveler'), was started by former Yated Ne'eman staff who were terminated for espousing views that were not in keeping with the newspaper's moderate editorial policies. The Faction's views are expressed editorially in the English language in a Brooklyn, New York, periodical called Lehovin (lit. 'To Understand').

== Criticism ==
In October 2017, Chaim Kanievsky issued a statement describing the Jerusalem Faction as "empty and reckless", and "like a flock without a shepherd".

== See also ==
- Conscription in Israel
- Refusal to serve in the IDF
