= Sha'arei Hesed =

Neighborhood in Jerusalem

Coordinates: 31°46′46.63″N 35°12′40.49″E

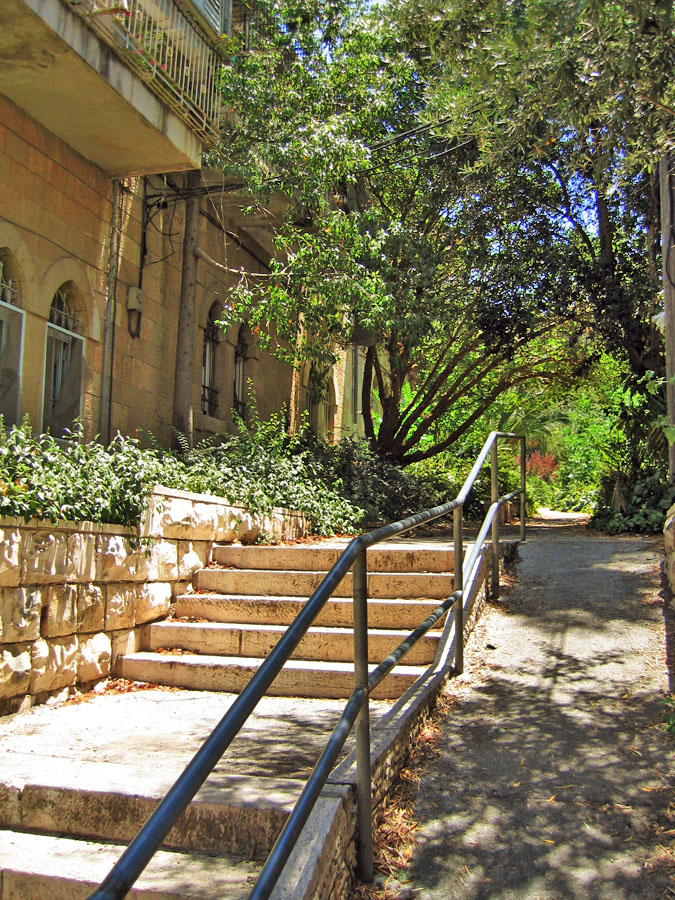
An alleyway in Sha'arei Hesed

Sha'arei Hesed (also Sha'arei Chessed) (Hebrew: שערי חסד, lit. Gates of Loving-kindness) is a neighborhood in central Jerusalem, bordering Rehavia, Nahlaot and Kiryat Wolfson.

== History ==
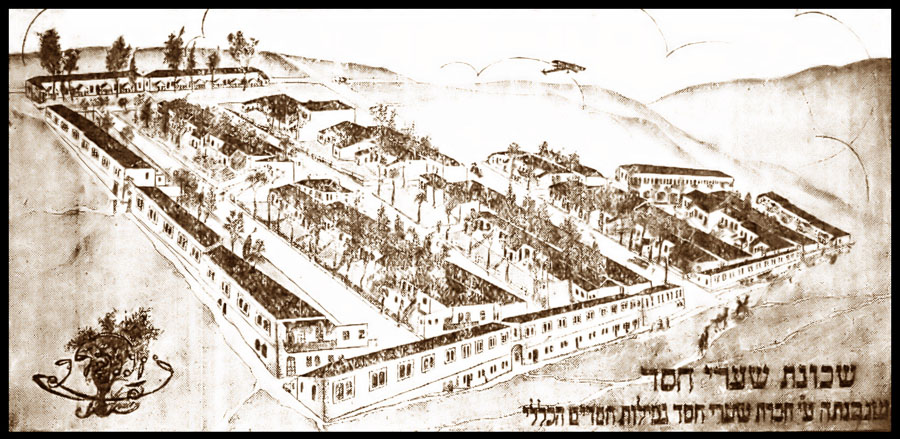
Neighborhood plan, 1909

One of the founders of the neighborhood was Yoel Moshe Salomon, who also founded Nahalat Shiv'a. The cornerstone was laid by the Ashkenazi chief rabbi of Jerusalem, Rabbi Shmuel Salant, in 1909. Rabbi Salant and Rabbi Naftali Porush established a building fund with donations from abroad to build small apartments for religious Jews in Jerusalem. The first 114 houses were built on long, narrow plots of land with a small yard in front or back.

== Today ==
In recent years, Sha'arei Hesed has become a modern Haredi neighborhood, as old-time Jerusalemites move out. The area is undergoing gentrification, and many homes have been purchased by affluent Orthodox Jewish families from abroad, especially from English-speaking and French-speaking countries. The neighborhood has several yeshivas, among them Maalos Hatorah, Midrash Shmuel and Noam HaTalmud, along with a large number of synagogues.

== Notable residents ==
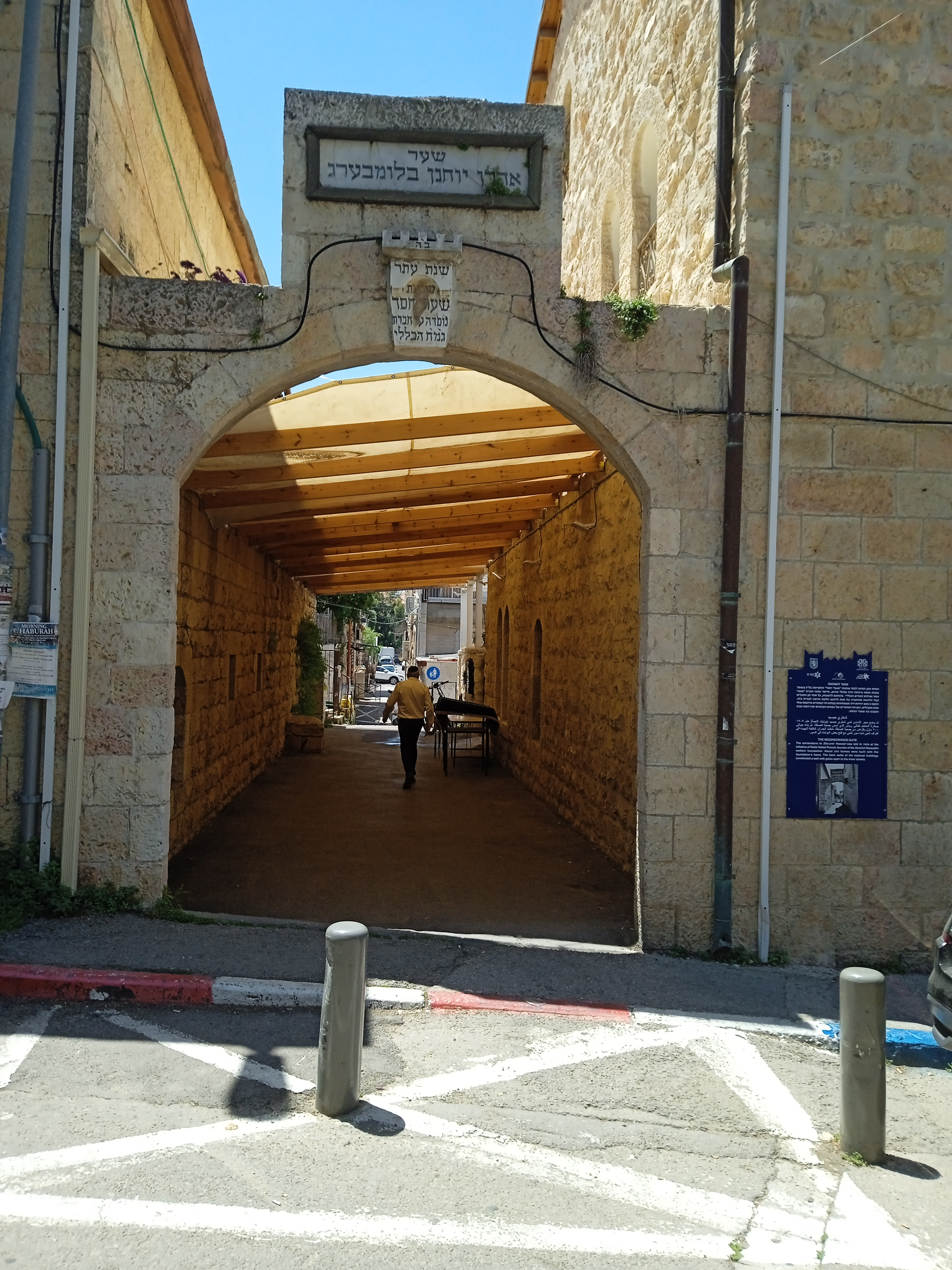
The gate of the neighborhood with a sign describing its history next to it.

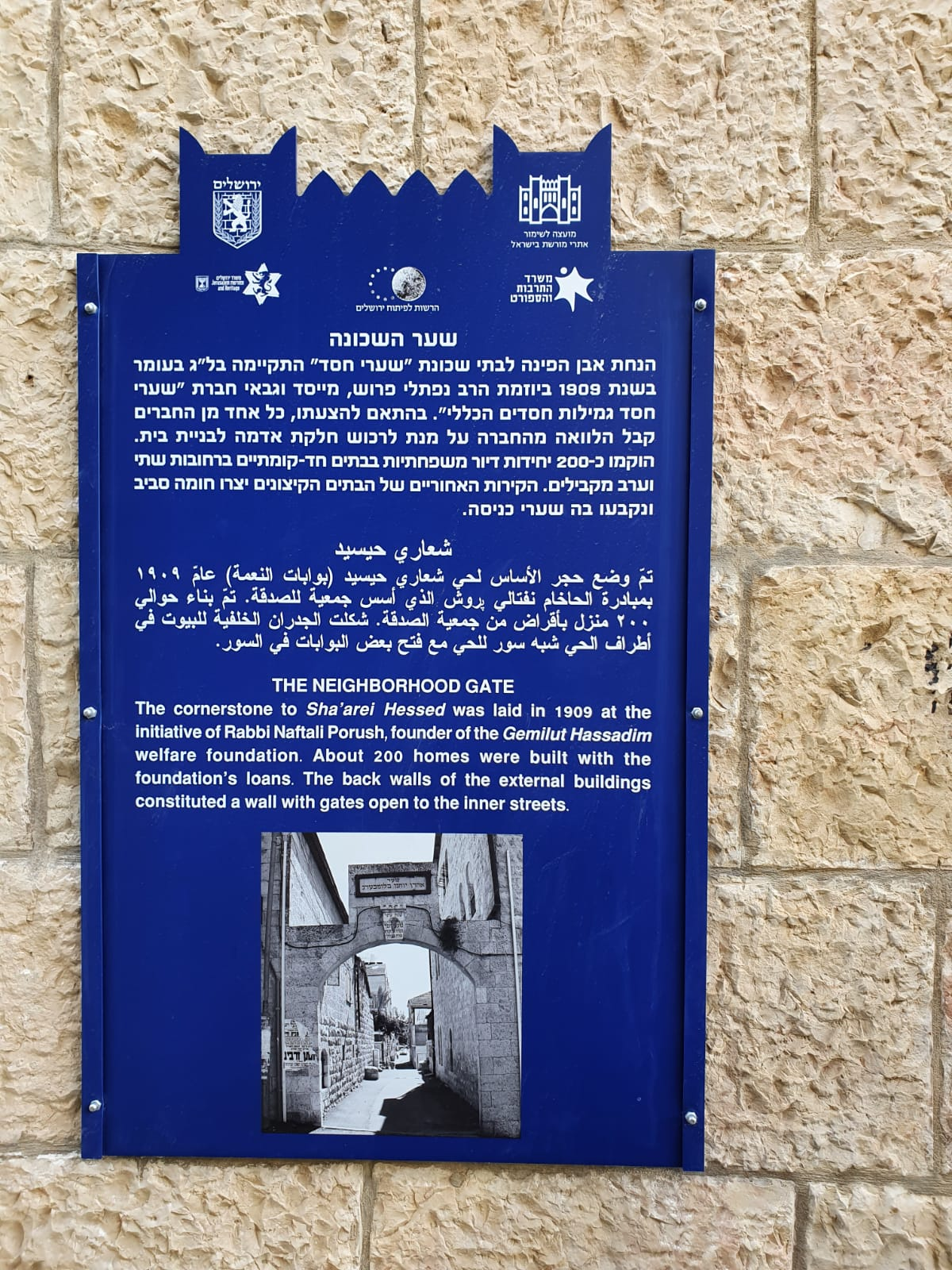
Enlarged sign

- Rabbi Yaakov Moshe Charlap, rabbi of Sha'arei Hesed and Rosh Yeshiva of the Mercaz HaRav Yeshiva
- Rav Shlomo Zalman Auerbach
- Shmuel Auerbach
- Rav Sholom Schwadron
- Rav Dov Berish Weidenfeld (Tchebiner Rav)
- Avraham David Rosenthal
- Mordechai Leib Kaminetzky
