= Nachum Neriya =

Rosh yeshiva of Torah Betziyon in Efrat, Israel

Rabbi Nachum Neriya (Hebrew: נחום נריה; 23 October 1941) is the rosh yeshiva of Torah Betziyon in Efrat, Israel, which he founded with his son, Yitzchak. He is a former rabbi at Yeshivat Hakotel.

He is the eldest son of Rabbi Moshe-Zvi Neria, a major figure in the religious-Zionist movement in Israel.

Neriya was a candidate for Chief Rabbi of Jerusalem, and was awarded a Jerusalem Prize for his activities in Kiruv (Jewish outreach).

A Torah scroll was dedicated to the yeshiva in his honor in 2013, where many major rabbinic figures from around Israel came to celebrate Neriya's life and work.
