= Shemirat Shabbat Kehilchatah =

Shemirat Shabbat Kehilchatah, also pronounced Shemiras Shabbos Kehilchosoh (Hebrew: שמירת שבת כהלכתה, lit. 'keeping Shabbat according to its law'; published in English as Shemirath Shabbath), is a book of halachah authored by Rabbi Yehoshua Yeshaya Neuwirth, which discusses the laws of Shabbat and Yom Tov, and is viewed by many as an authoritative work regarding these laws. Rabbi Neuwirth is a prominent student of Rabbi Shlomo Zalman Auerbach, and the book generally follows Rabbi Auerbach's opinions. The book discusses practical situations such as driving to a hospital on Shabbat in an emergency.

The book rules in accordance with Rabbi Moses Isserles (the Rema), i.e. according to the practice of Ashkenazic Jews. Because the book is popular and Sephardic Jews wish to use it also, Rabbi Yehuda Lavi Ben-David wrote a commentary of notes called Badey Hashulchan (Hebrew: בדי השלחן, lit. 'poles of the table') which delineates the opinions of Sephardic poskim.

The second edition of Shemirat Shabbat Kehilchatah has been translated to English and published by Feldheim.

== Volumes ==
Two volumes came out:

1. The original volume; discusses which acts are permitted or prohibited to do on Shabbat. (שמור את יום השבת 'Guard the Shabbat day')
2. Published many years later; discusses the halachot of Kiddush and davening (prayer) of Shabbat. (זכור את יום השבת לקדשו 'Remember the Shabbat day to sanctify it')

The second edition published by Feldheim had three volumes:

1. Chapters 1–22: Food preparation, selecting articles, fire, care of the body and of clothing, toys and games, a basic understanding of Hotzaah (including carrying without an eruv), and muktzeh. (Hard-cover editions also include an introduction with guidelines on whether a Sabbath violation is biblical or rabbinical.)
2. Chapters 23–41: Housekeeping, protective shelters, health hazards, flora and fauna, stationery, clocks, noisemakers, payment, preparing in advance, Isaiah-derived laws on how to conduct oneself, gentiles, and how and when the Sabbath may be violated.
3. Chapters 42–68: Laws pertaining to certain times of day, mourning, and Chol HaMoed. (Hard-cover editions also include a comprehensive index.)

== Controversy ==
The book has been published in two different versions. After the first version was published, Rabbi Neuwirth was pressured to change many of his rulings, so in the second version many stringencies (chumrahs) were added, and the footnotes stated that there was an alternative lenient opinion. Rabbi Yaakov Yisrael Kanievsky attacked the book in a sharply worded footnote in his book Chayei Olam, and some other rabbis from the Lithuanian tradition supported him. However, the prominent Gedolim who wrote glowing Haskamos (letters of approbation) to the book presumably disagreed. Besides Rabbi Auerbach, these include Rabbi Yechezkel Abramsky, Rav Moshe Feinstein, Rabbi Yosef Breuer, and Rabbi Yechiel Yaakov Weinberg. Moreover, in 1993, about two years before his death, Rabbi Auerbach published a collection of footnotes and corrections to Shemirat Shabbat Kehilchatah, thus further strengthening its stature as an accepted work of halakhic decision-making.
