= Yaakov Moshe Charlap =

Rabbi Yaakov Moshe Charlap יעקב משה חרל"פ
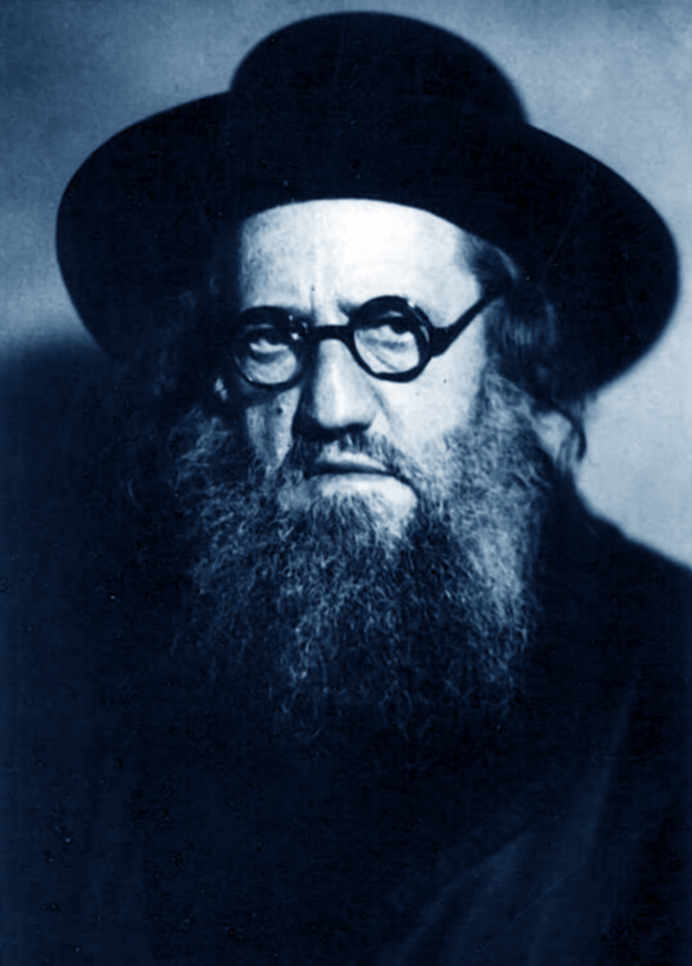
- Rabbi Yaakov Moshe Charlap
- Title: Rosh Yeshiva of the Mercaz HaRav yeshiva

Personal life
- Born: 16 November 1882 Jerusalem
- Died: December 6, 1951 (aged 69) Jerusalem
- Buried: Sanhedria Cemetery, Jerusalem

Religious life
- Religion: Judaism
- Denomination: Orthodox

Rabbi Yaakov Moshe Charlap (Hebrew: יעקב משה חרל"פ; born 16 November 1882 - died 6 December 1951) was an Orthodox rabbi, talmudist, kabbalist, Rosh Yeshiva of the Mercaz HaRav yeshiva, and a disciple of Rabbi Abraham Isaac Kook.

Rabbi Charlap served as rabbi of the Sha'arei Hesed neighborhood in central Jerusalem, and author of the Mei Marom series of books on Jewish thought.

== Biography ==
Rabbi Charlap was born in Jerusalem in 1882, where his father served as a rabbinic judge (dayan) in the bet din of Rabbi Yehoshua Leib Diskin.

Shortly after Rabbi Abraham Isaac Kook arrived in Israel in 1904, the two developed a close relationship; Rabbi Charlap was particularly influenced by Rabbi Kook's thought.

When the Sha'arei Hesed neighborhood of Jerusalem was established outside the Old City in 1908, Rabbi Charlap was appointed rabbi of the neighborhood.

In 1924, when Rabbi Kook established the Mercaz HaRav yeshiva, Rabbi Charlap was appointed Rosh Yeshiva, a position he held until his death in 1951.

When the State of Israel was founded in 1948, he expressed both orally and in writing that this event signified “the beginning of the redemption”.

Among his notable students were rabbis Yehuda Amital, Shaul Yisraeli, Moshe-Zvi Neria, and Avraham Zuckerman.

He died in 1951 and is buried in the Sanhedria Cemetery of Jerusalem. His grandson was Rabbi Zevulun Charlop.
