= Shmuel Auerbach =

Israeli rabbi (1931–2018)

Rabbi Shmuel Auerbach
- שמואל אוירבך
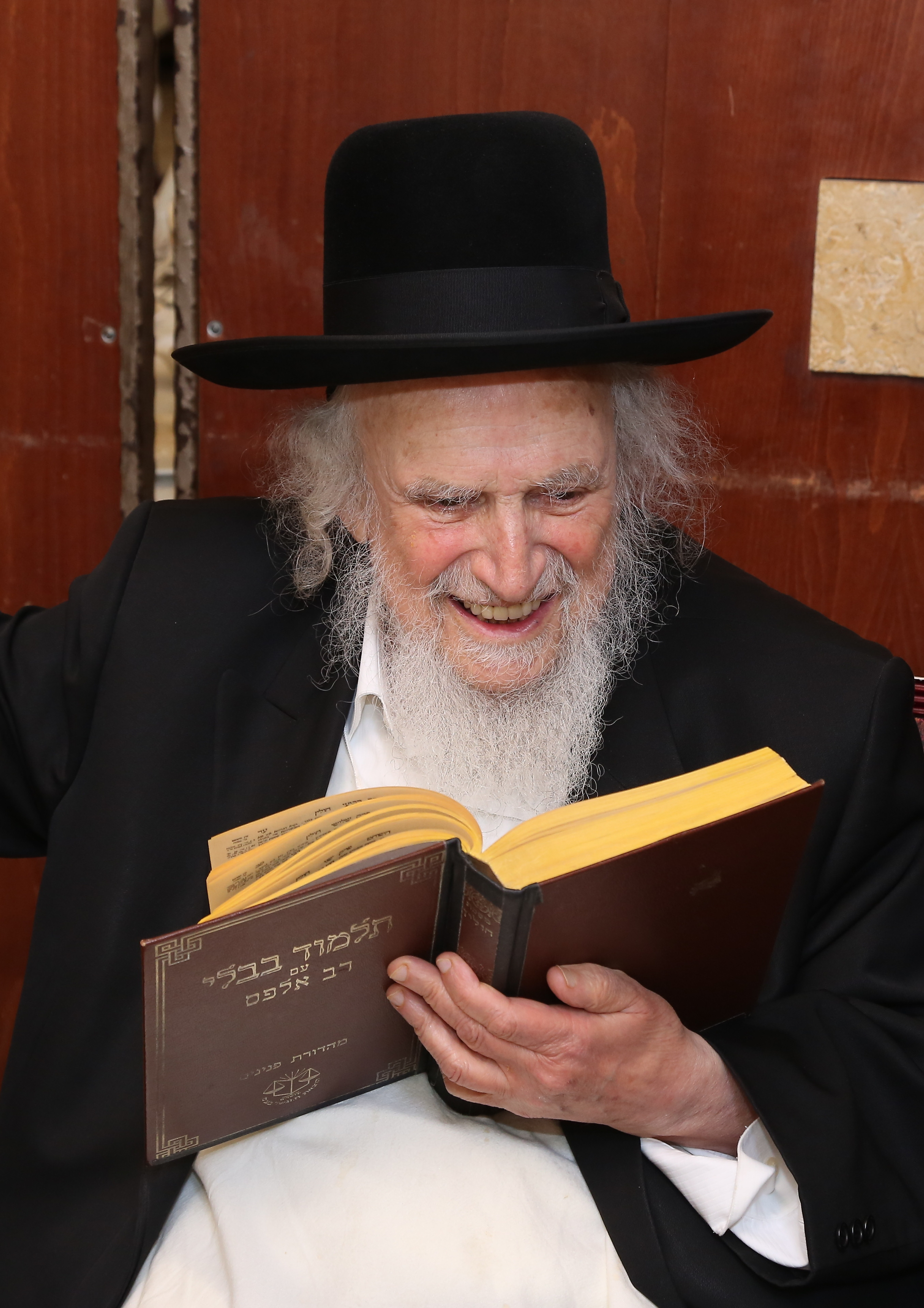
- Auerbach in 2013

Personal life
- Born: September 21, 1931 Jerusalem, Mandate Palestine
- Died: February 24, 2018 (aged 86) Jerusalem
- Spouse: Rachel (deceased)
- Parent(s): Shlomo Zalman Auerbach and Chaya Rivka Ruchamkin

Religious life
- Religion: Judaism
- Denomination: Haredi

Jewish leader
- Position: Rosh yeshiva
- Yeshiva: Yeshivas Ma'alos HaTorah
- Organisation: Jerusalem Faction
- Residence: Sha'arei Hesed, Jerusalem

Shmuel Auerbach (Hebrew: שמואל אוירבך; September 21, 1931 – February 24, 2018) was a Haredi rabbi in Jerusalem. Considered a leader in the non-Hasidic Haredi community in Israel, his followers formed a political organisation known as the Jerusalem Faction.

== Biography ==
Auerbach was the eldest son of Shlomo Zalman Auerbach and his wife, Chaya Rivka Ruchamkin. He was born in the Jerusalem neighborhood of Sha'arei Hesed—as was his father—and resided there all his life. He married Rachel Paksher (d. 11 January 1990). They had no children. He named his musar sefer Ohel Rachel in her memory.

== Rabbinic career ==
Auerbach was the rosh yeshiva of Ma'alot HaTorah and the Nasi (president) of Yeshivas Midrash Shmuel and Yeshivas Toras Simcha, both in Jerusalem. For a short time, he also served as one of the roshei yeshiva of Yeshivas Itri in Jerusalem.

Auerbach was the head of the Bnei Torah party (colloquially referred to as "Etz"), which he founded. His followers formed a political organisation known as the Jerusalem Faction. In a 2010 letter signed together with Yosef Shalom Elyashiv, Aharon Leib Shteinman and Nissim Karelitz, Auerbach expressed his strong disapproval of conversions to Judaism involving Israeli soldiers—being performed by Israel Defense Forces (IDF) rabbis—the process of which the former determined to be a violation of halakha (Jewish law). In 2013, as the Israeli government launched a campaign to draft Ultra Orthodox men into the IDF, the Jerusalem Faction adopted a controversial policy of demonstrations and incitement against the draft.

== Works ==
- Darchei Shmuel, A series of chidushim on various Talmudic Tractates. The first volumes, on Tractate Ohalot, was published in 1996. Following his death, additional volumes were published on tractates Shabbat, Rosh Hashanah and Megillah.
- Ohel Rachel, a series of mussar discourses compiled by his student, Rabbi Yair Erlanger.
