= Tehumin =

Jewish journal

- Discipline: Jewish law and modernity
- Language: Hebrew

Publication details
- History: 1980–present
- Publisher: Zomet Institute (Israel)
- Frequency: Annual

Standard abbreviations
- ISO 4: Tehumin

Links
- Journal homepage

Tehumin (Hebrew: תחומין, Tehumin being an acronym for Torah Hevrah UMedINa (Hebrew: תורה חברה ומדינה), lit. Torah, Society and State) is a Hebrew-language annual journal of articles about Jewish law and Modernity.

== History ==
Tehumin is published in Israel by the Zomet Institute. It has appeared every year since its creation in 1980. Selected articles From Tehumin have been translated into English and published as Crossroads: Halacha and the Modern World.

The journal deals with:

- Shabbat and Jewish holiday
- Law and Justice
- Army and Security.
- Medicine and Medical ethics
- Marriage and Family law
