= Moshe-Zvi Neria =

Israeli politician (1913–1995)

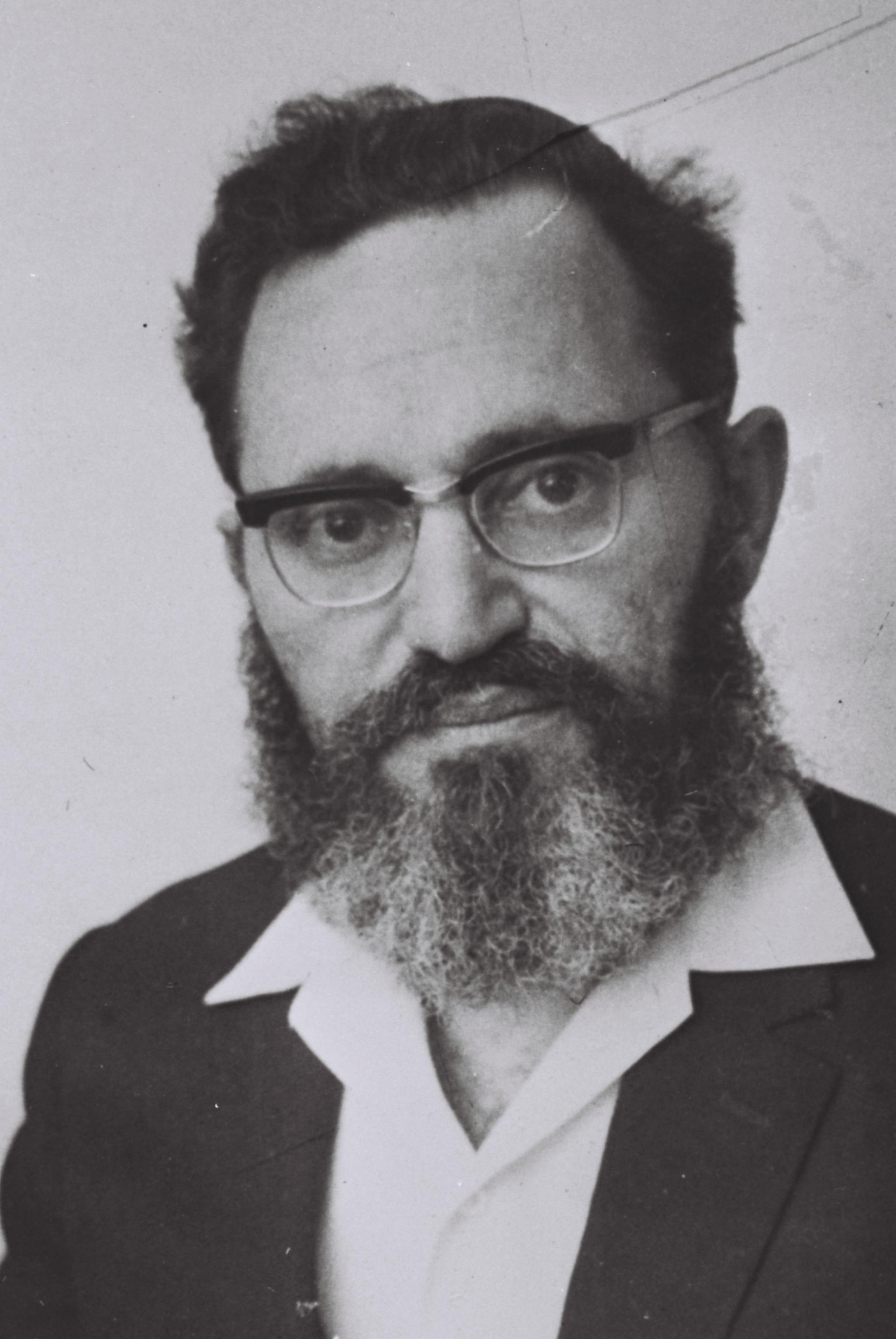
- Neria in 1969

Faction represented in the Knesset
- 1969–1974: National Religious Party

Personal details
- Born: 29 January 1913 Łódź, Russian Empire
- Died: 12 December 1995 (aged 82)

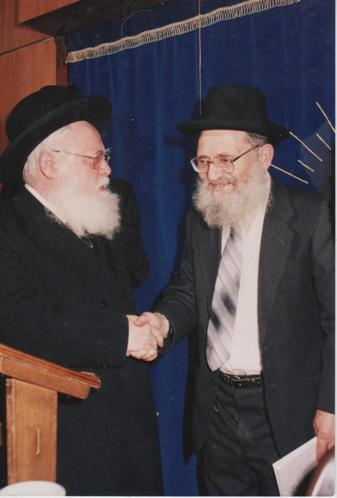
Rabbi Moshe-Zvi Neria (right) with Rabbi Avraham Shapira

Rabbi Moshe-Zvi Neria (Hebrew: משה צבי נריה; 29 January 1913 – 12 December 1995) was an Israeli educator, writer and rosh yeshiva who served as a member of the Knesset for the National Religious Party between 1969 and 1974. Neria established and headed the Bnei Akiva yeshiva in Kfar Haroeh, and was one of Rabbi Abraham Isaac Kook's most influential disciples. Due to his far-reaching influence on Religious Zionism, he is known as "the father of the knit kippah generation."

== Biography ==
Born Moshe-Zvi Menkin in Łódź in the Russian Empire (today in Poland), Neria studied under Rabbi Moshe Feinstein and his brother Rabbi Mordechai Feinstein in their yeshiva in Minsk. Neria followed Mordechai to Shkloŭ and continued his Torah studies in the relocated Shklov yeshiva. He emigrated to Mandatory Palestine in 1930 after Soviet diktats made Jewish life unsustainable in Russia. At the direction of the Feinstein brothers, Neria studied at the Mercaz HaRav yeshiva with Rabbi Abraham Isaac Kook, receiving certification as a rabbi. He also studied in the Mizrachi teaching seminary in Jerusalem. At one point he lived in the Knesset Yisrael neighbourhood.

He helped establish the Bnei Akiva youth movement, and edited its publication Zra'im. In 1940 he founded the first Bnei Akiva yeshiva in Kfar Haroeh, serving as its headmaster and teaching Talmud and Jewish thought. He later established several yeshiva high schools and Hesder yeshivas for Israel Defense Forces soldiers. In addition, he founded the Hapoel HaMizrachi Rabbinical Association.

In 1969 he was elected to the Knesset on the National Religious Party list, serving for one term. He left the party in 1983 to establish the Religious Zionist Camp (also known as Mazad).

Neria died on 12 December 1995 at the age of 82. His last words were "Give me kedushah (holiness), it is kedushah that I seek! The holiness of the Land of Israel, the holiness of the love of Israel, the holiness of the Nation of Israel."

Neria and his wife Rachel had eight children. His eldest is Rabbi Nachum Neriya, rosh yeshiva of Torah Betziyon in the West Bank settlement of Efrat. His grandson is Rabbi Ariel Bareli.

== Writings ==
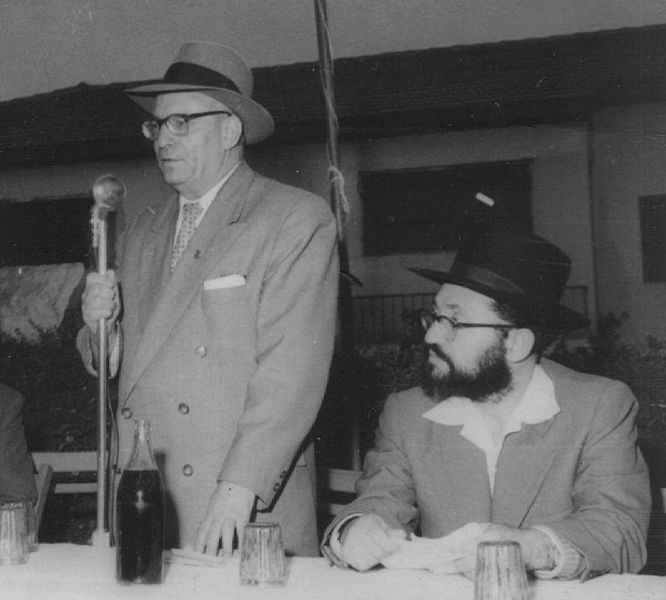
Yeshayahu Bernstein speaking with Rabbi Neria, sitting to his left.

Neria authored several books that interwove biographical details of Rav Kook's life with selected passages from his writings, addressing themes such as redemption, the restoration of the land of Israel, Torah and prayer. These included:

- Orot HaTefilah - on prayer
- Moadei HaRe'iyah on Shabbat and Jewish holidays
- Chayei HaRe'iyah on the period when Rav Kook was chief rabbi of Jaffa
- Likutei HaRe'iyah
- Sichot HaRe'iyah
- Bisdei HaRe'iyah
- Tal HaRe'iyah
- Mishnat HaRav - ten chapters on the foundations of Rav Kook's philosophy

== Views ==
When asked whether a rabbi should be involved in politics. He replied, "Absolutely not. In politics, it is sometimes necessary to compromise on principles in order to accomplish important goals, and that is not a proper thing for a rabbi to do."

== Awards and recognition ==
In 1978 he was awarded the Israel Prize for special contribution to society and the state. The Israeli settlement Neria, established in 1991, is named after him, a neighborhood in Lod (Nof Neria) and streets in Netanya, Petah Tikva, Rishon LeZion, Rehovot, Bet El and Kfar Haroeh. Several schools were named after him, including the Hesder yeshiva in Shadmot Mehola (Shadmot Neria), Ulpanat Neria in Dimona and Moreshet Neria in Giv'at Shmuel.
