= Shlomo Zalman Auerbach =

Israeli rabbi

Rabbi Shlomo Zalman Auerbach שלמה זלמן אויערבאך
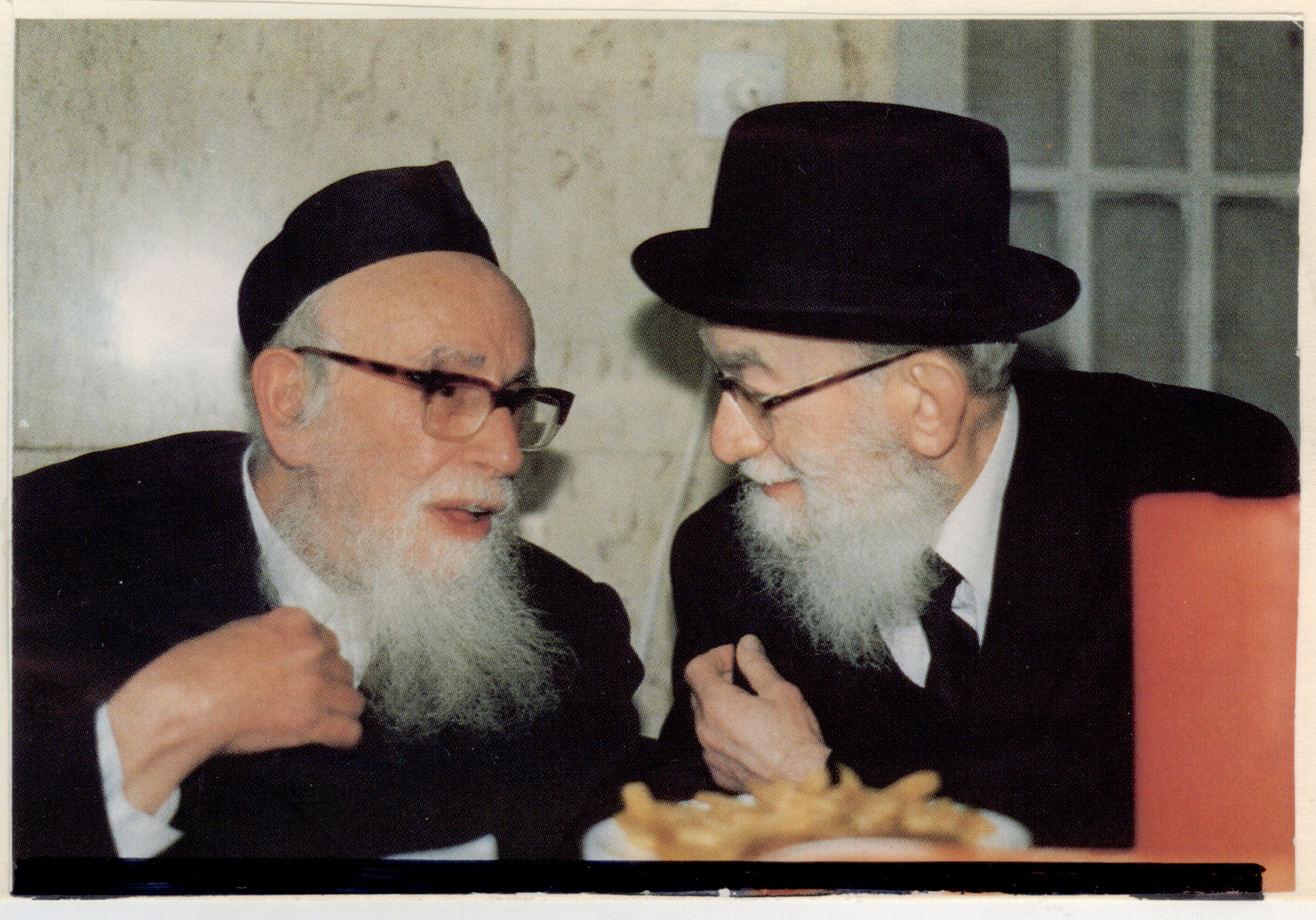
- Shlomo Zalman Auerbach (left) with Gedaliah Eiseman (1989)

Personal life
- Born: July 20, 1910 Sha'arei Hesed, Ottoman Empire
- Died: February 20, 1995 (aged 84) Israel
- Spouse: Chaya Rivka Ruchamkin
- Children: Shmuel; Ezriel; Avraham Dov (died 2021); Mordechai; Yaakov Auerbach; Meir Simcha; Baruch; Rachel (married Zalman Nechemia Goldberg)

Religious life
- Religion: Judaism
- Denomination: Orthodox
- Yeshiva: Kol Torah
- Position: Rosh Yeshiva

Shlomo Zalman Auerbach (Hebrew: שלמה זלמן אויערבאך; July 20, 1910 – February 20, 1995) was an Orthodox Jewish rabbi, posek, and rosh yeshiva of the Kol Torah yeshiva in Jerusalem. The Jerusalem neighborhood Ramat Shlomo is named after Auerbach.

== Biography ==
Auerbach was the first child to be born in the Sha'arei Hesed neighborhood of Jerusalem founded by his maternal grandfather, Shlomo Zalman Porush, after whom he was named. His father, Chaim Yehuda Leib Auerbach, was rosh yeshiva of Shaar Hashamayim Yeshiva, and his mother was named Tzivia.

Following his marriage, he studied under Zvi Pesach Frank at Kollel Kerem Tzion.

His first major published work, Meorei Esh, was the first ever written on the subject of using electricity on Shabbat.

He was the brother-in-law of Rabbi Sholom Schwadron, who married his sister Leah.

Auerbach died on February 20, 1995. An estimated 300,000 - 500,000 people attended his funeral in 1995. He was interred on Har HaMenuchot.

Auerbach had seven sons, including rabbis Shmuel Auerbach and Ezriel Auerbach, and three daughters, one of whom was married to Zalman Nechemia Goldberg.

=== Students ===
Rabbis who were his students include:

- Zalman Nechemia Goldberg, his son-in-law.
- Meir Kessler
- Avigdor Nebenzahl
- Yehoshua Neuwirth

== Works ==
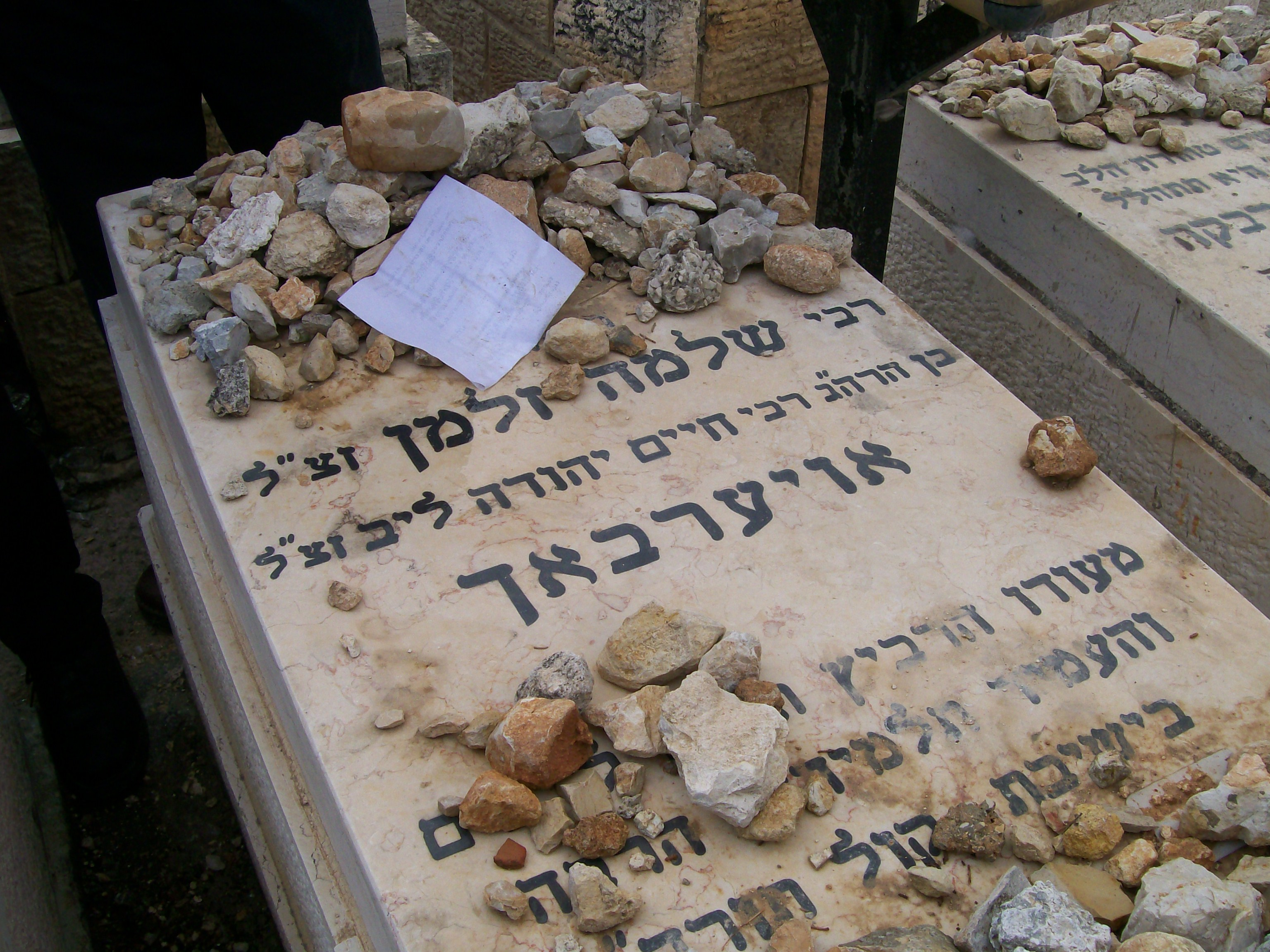
Auerbach's tombstone. The inscription reads in part: "From a young age he spread Torah among the public, and had many students in Yeshivas Kol Torah"

Sefarim written by Auerbach include:

- Meorei Eish, a pioneering work concerning electricity in halacha, (1935)
- Ma'adanei Eretz, a two-volume book regarding agricultural halacha, (1946)
- Minchas Shlomo (responsa), first volume (1986), second volume (2003)
- Minchas Shlomo, a commentary on the Talmud

He also authored a commentary on Shev Shema'tata.

His rulings on medical matters and halacha were summarized and publicized by Yehoshua Neuwirth in his book Shemirat Shabbat Kehilchatah, Abraham S. Abraham in his Nishmat Avraham, and Avraham Steinberg in his Encyclopedia Hilchatit Refuit.

== See also ==
- Magen Lacholeh
