= Elyashiv (disambiguation) =

Elyashiv (Hebrew: אֶלְיָשִׁיב, lit. God will bring back) is a moshav in central Israel.

Elyashiv may also refer to:

== People ==
- Avrohom Elyashiv (c. 1877–1942), rabbi and Av Beis Din of the city of Gomel
- Shlomo Elyashiv (1841–1926), kabbalist from Lithuania
- Yosef Shalom Elyashiv (1910–2012), Israeli Haredi rabbi and posek

== Archaeology ==
- Eliashib Archive, also known as the Arad Ostraca, a collection of inscribed potsherds from 7th century BCE Judah
