= Hanoch Teller =

Austrian-born American rabbi

- חנוך טלר
- Born: Hanoch Teller; 1956 (age 69–70); Vienna, Austria
- Education: Yeshiva University, Mir yeshiva (Jerusalem)
- Occupations: Author, lecturer, producer, tour guide
- Spouse: Aidel Teller
- Writing career
- Language: English
- Genres: True, contemporary stories conveying inspirational and ethical themes Biographies of gedolim
- Notable awards: My Jerusalem Prize, 1982
- Website: hanochteller.com

Hanoch Teller (Hebrew: חנוך טלר; born 1956) is an Orthodox Jewish rabbi, author, lecturer, and producer who popularized the Jewish literary genre of true, contemporary stories to convey inspirational and ethical themes. Author of 28 books, Teller is also a tour guide in Jerusalem, Israel.

== Early life ==
Teller was born in Vienna, Austria, to Shlomo Meir Teller and his wife Edna (née Lichtenstein). His father had fled to the United States after the Nazi annexation of Austria in 1938 but returned to Vienna after World War II to recover the family business. When Teller was a young boy, he and his parents moved to Stamford, Connecticut.

Teller attended the New England Academy of Torah in Providence, Rhode Island and completed his ninth-grade year in a high school in Israel. He received his bachelor's degree in history after only 18 months of study by combining CLEP examinations with studies at five different universities simultaneously. He earned a liberal arts degree from Yeshiva University of New York. He has studied at the Mir Yeshiva in Jerusalem for more than three decades. He received rabbinic ordination from the previous Rav of the Kotel, Rabbi Meir Yehuda Getz.

He and his wife, Aidel, reside in the Arzei HaBira neighborhood of Jerusalem.

== Author ==
Teller began his writing career in 1977 when he submitted an article to The Jewish Observer and Moment magazine about his encounter with American college students in Kiryat Shmona, whose program bypassed the traditional religious and cultural centers of Israel in favor of community service in a development town. In the beginning he wrote under the pen name Abba Eidelman. He has also written for the Jewish Women's Outlook and The Jerusalem Post. He received the My Jerusalem Prize of 5742 (1982) in an international essay competition marking the fifteenth anniversary of the reunification of Jerusalem.

His first series of books in the mid-1980s, Once Upon a Soul, Souled! and Soul Survivors, introduced the genre of true, contemporary stories promoting the themes of hashgacha pratis (Divine Providence) and human kindness. Teller later branched out into biographies of contemporary Orthodox Jewish personalities — such as Rabbi Shlomo Zalman Auerbach (whose shiur he attended for 14 years), Rabbi Levi Yitzchak Horowitz (the Bostoner Rebbe), Baltimore Torah day school principal Rabbi Binyamin Steinberg, Toronto philanthropist Joseph Tanenbaum, and Mir rosh yeshiva Rabbi Nosson Tzvi Finkel (under whom he studied for over 30 years) — using anecdotes to convey moral and ethical lessons. A large section of his corpus presents stories on specific ethical concepts, such as judging others favorably (Courtrooms of the Mind), integrity (Above the Bottom Line), and avoiding argumentation and strife (Give Peace a Stance).

He is known for the high-level vocabulary and witty turns of phrase that he employs in his writing. Several of his books have been translated into Hebrew, Russian, and Spanish. Teller also works closely with graphic designers of his book covers; the cover of Heroic Children: Untold Stories of the Unconquerable (2015) received the 2016 Benjamin Franklin Book Award for non-fiction cover design from the Independent Book Publishers Association.

== Lecturer ==
Teller's teaching career began as a result of his first article about the American college students in northern Israel, which attracted the interest of the directors of the newly created women's division at Ohr Somayach. His folksy and entertaining style, combined with his anecdotal stories of Gedolim (Torah leaders), made him a popular instructor at the Ohr Somayach women's division and other English-speaking Jerusalem seminaries for American students. He is currently a faculty member at Michlelet Mevaseret Yerushalayim College of Jewish Studies for Women, Darchei Binah Women's School, Afikei Torah Women's School for Advanced Torah Studies, Midreshet Moriah, Michlala-Jerusalem College, Bnot Torah Institute, Neve Yerushalayim, and Naaleh Online Torah School. He is also an instructor at Yeshivat Hakotel for men. Teller has made over 100 shidduchim among his students and other young people.

Teller is an international speaker for schools, women's groups, synagogue functions, learning seminars, fundraising dinners, and organizational meetings in North America, Central America, South America, Europe, Israel, and Australia. In his talks, he teaches Torah topics interwoven with inspiring stories about Gedolim and other Jewish heroes. Following the publication of his 2015 non-fiction book Heroic Children: Untold Stories of the Unconquerable, he was invited to speak on the Holocaust and stories of child survivors to both Jewish and non-Jewish groups in the United States.

Teller is a senior docent at Yad Vashem, licensed to lead tours in its new Holocaust Memorial Museum. His tours combine his knowledge of the events and lessons of the Holocaust with stories describing the experiences of individual victims. He has produced an eleven-part CD lecture series on this subject, titled Comprehending the Incomprehensible: The History, Heroism and Lessons of the Holocaust.

== Producer ==
In 1996 Teller produced a docudrama exploring miracles in everyday life (Do You Believe in Miracles?) which was seen by over 70,000 people in Jewish community centers, synagogues, and other venues around the globe. In March 2012 he released a documentary about the Hasidic master Elimelech of Lizhensk and the Hasidic legacy of brotherhood, which includes musical performances by Jewish music personalities Abish Brodt and Avraham Fried.

== Bibliography ==
=== Books ===
- Once Upon A Soul: Stories of striving and yearning. Feldheim. 1984. ISBN 0961477237.
- Soul Survivors: True stories of striving and yearning. Feldheim. 1985. ISBN 0961477202.
- Souled!. NYC Publishing. 1986. ISBN 0961477210.
- The Story of the Steipler Gaon : The life and times of Rabbi Yaakov Yisrael Kanievsky. Mesorah Publications. 1986. ISBN 0899067956.
- Sunset: Stories of our contemporary Torah luminaries and their spiritual heroism. Feldheim. 1987. ISBN 0961477229.
- Courtrooms of the Mind: Stories and advice on judging others favorably. Feldheim. 1987. ISBN 0961477245.
- Above the Bottom Line: Stories and advice on integrity. Feldheim. 1988. ISBN 0961477253.
- Pichifkes: Stories heard on the road and by the way. Feldheim. 1989. ISBN 096147727X.
- The Bostoner: Stories and recollections from the colorful Chassidic court of the Bostoner Rebbe, Rabbi Levi I. Horowitz. Feldheim. 1990. ISBN 0873065077.
- Bridges of Steel, Ladders of Gold: Joseph Tanenbaum, builder of bridges to Torah. Feldheim. 1990. ISBN 0873065263.
- Hey, Taxi!: Tales told in taxis and recounted by cabbies. Feldheim. 1990. ISBN 0961477288.
- Welcome to the real world. NYC Publishing. 1990. ISBN 9789998715448.
- Best of Storylines. Feldheim. 1991. ISBN 0961477296.
- Give Peace a Stance: Stories and advice on promoting and maintaining peace. Feldheim. 1992. ISBN 1881939006.
- A Matter of Principal: A tribute to Rabbi Binyamin Steinberg. Feldheim. 1994. ISBN 1881939030.
- And From Jerusalem, His Word: Stories and insights of Rabbi Shlomo Zalman Auerbach. Feldheim. 1995. ISBN 1881939057.
- A Midrash and a Maaseh: An anthology of insights and commentaries on the weekly Torah reading, including hundreds of old favorites and new stories. Feldheim. 1996. ISBN 188193909X. (2 vols.)
- It's a Small Word After All: The amazing impact of a kind gesture or a thoughtful remark on human lives and events. Feldheim. 1997. ISBN 1881939103.
- The Mini A Midrash and a Maaseh. Feldheim. 1998. ISBN 188193912X.
- In an Unrelated Story: A compelling collection of newsworthy tales. Feldheim. 1999. ISBN 1881939146.
- Builders: Stories and insights into the lives of three paramount figures of the Torah renaissance. Feldheim. 2000. ISBN 1881939154.
- Too Beautiful: Stories so uplifting they have to be shared. NYC Publishing. 2009. ISBN 978-1881939207.
- For the Love of Torah: Stories and insights of Rabbi Nosson Zvi Finkel, zt"l. Feldheim. 2012. ISBN 978-1-881939-21-4.
- Heroic Children: Untold Stories of the Unconquerable. New York City Publishing Co. 2015. ISBN 9781881939238

=== Selected chapters ===
- "Pencil It In" and "Caution: Jewish Minds at Work" in Jewish Stories from Heaven and Earth: Inspiring tales to nourish the heart and soul, Rabbi Dov Peretz Elkins, ed. Jewish Lights Publishing, 2008, pp. 87–91, 153–155. ISBN 1580233635.

=== Audio tapes and CDs ===
- The Righteous Live On: Rabbi Shlomo Zalman Auerbach (2-tape set)
- The Righteous Live On: Frau Sarah Schenirer and how the Mirrer Yeshiva escaped to Shanghai (2 tapes)
- The Righteous Live On: Rabbi Aharon Kotler (2 tapes)
- The Righteous Live On: Appease process (2 tapes)
- The Righteous Live On: Breaking open the potential vault
- The Righteous Live On: We're too small a people, to be a small people
- The Righteous Live On: Remembering the Chofetz Chaim
- The Righteous Live On: Paramount leaders of the Torah renaissance. Sameach Music. 2002.
- Building Bene Brak: The vision, foundation and luminaries of a celebrated Torah community
- Comprehending the Incomprehensible: The history, heroism and lessons of the Holocaust, 11-CD album, 2007

=== DVDs ===
- Do You Believe in Miracles?: True stories celebrating Divine Providence, 1996
- Reb Elimelech and the Chassidic Legacy of Brotherhood, 2012
