= Heroic Children =

2015 non-fiction book by Hanoch Teller

Heroic Children: Untold Stories of the Unconquerable
- Cover
- Author: Hanoch Teller
- Language: English
- Subject: Child Holocaust survivors
- Genre: Non-fiction
- Publisher: New York City Publishing Co.
- Publication date: 2015
- Publication place: United States
- Pages: 325
- Awards: 2016 IPBA Benjamin Franklin Book Award for cover design
- ISBN: 9781881939238

Heroic Children: Untold Stories of the Unconquerable is a 2015 non-fiction book by Hanoch Teller. The book recounts the true stories of nine individuals from Jewish communities across Europe who survived the Holocaust as children. It is the 28th book by Teller, a prolific writer of inspirational books who is also a senior docent at Yad Vashem. The cover design won the 2016 Benjamin Franklin Book Award from the Independent Book Publishers Association.

== Synopsis ==
Heroic Children retells the true life stories of nine individuals who survived the Holocaust as children. Each story begins with the outbreak of war and concludes with liberation. A short epilogue appended to each chapter informs the reader of the subject's postwar experiences and accomplishments. Photographs of the interviewees as children and as adults are included.

== Development ==
Teller spent 14 years researching the book. He traveled to numerous countries to find and interview people who had survived the Holocaust as children—a time when more than 1.5 million children were murdered and less than three percent of those under 18 survived. Teller's subjects represent all backgrounds, including "different socio-economic groups, religious and not religious, male and female".

Teller viewed the project as one not only of historical research but also as a source of inspiration and hope for readers who face challenges, albeit less formidable, in their own lives.

== Publication ==
The 352-page first edition was published by New York City Publishing Co. in 2015. The book contains approbations by Rabbi Yisrael Meir Lau, Sir Martin Gilbert, and Rabbi Baron Jonathan Sacks.

The cover design reproduces an authentic photograph of children at the liberation of Auschwitz in January 1945, from the collection of the United States Holocaust Memorial Museum. However, the child singled out in color had not given permission to use his picture or alter it in any way. Knowing only the boy's surname and the fact that he lived in Europe, Teller succeeded in locating the individual 70 years later and obtaining his permission. Teller said of the choice to colorize one child in the sepia-toned photograph: "What I wanted to do in the cover was highlight one child to show it's not just a statistic". Teller contends that "it's easier to relate to one person than to all the victims of the Holocaust".

Considering that his interviewees were now senior citizens, Teller did additional research to verify the accuracy of their childhood stories. While the first edition did not include citations, Teller issued a second edition in 2016 containing more than 1,000 explanatory endnotes.

== Critical reception ==
An op-ed in Israel National News said the book "rivets the reader, no matter how many books about the Holocaust he has read". In addition to depicting each child's daily battle for survival, the review asserts that "[t]he parents of the children are beyond belief. Their willingness to endanger themselves and sacrifice their own lives in frenzied and often futile efforts to save their children attests to a love that surpasses the reality we know." This review also lauds the book for putting to rest the canard that the Jews did not resist the Nazis, as the stories reveal the cunning and deception employed by the Germans to control and subdue the population.

The Jewish Book Council recommended the book for ages 12 and up.

== Awards and honors ==
The book received the 2016 Benjamin Franklin Book Award for non-fiction cover design, small format, from the Independent Book Publishers Association.
