= Chaim Kanievsky =

Haredi rabbi and leader in Israel (1928–2022)

Rabbi Chaim Kanievsky חיים קניבסקי
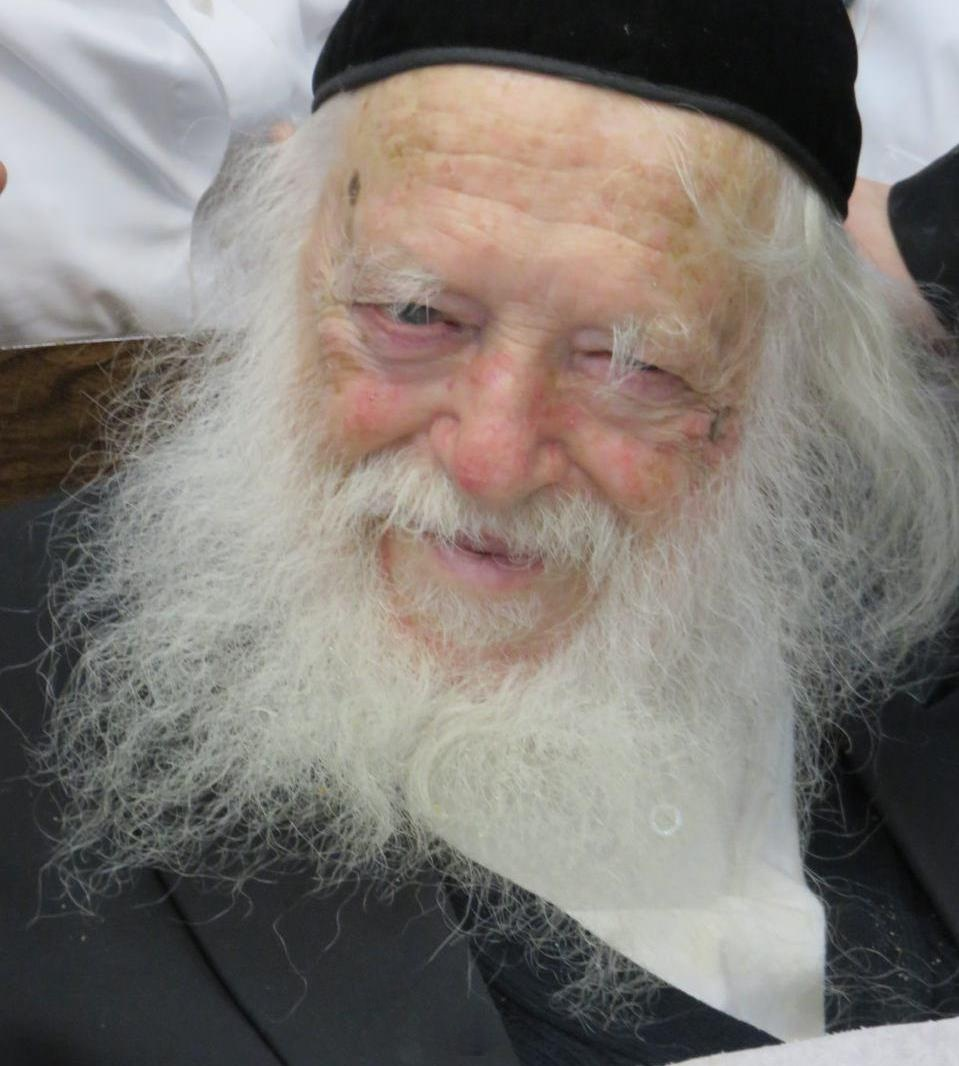

Personal life
- Born: Shmaryahu Yosef Chaim Kanievsky שמריהו יוסף חיים קַניֶבסקִי; January 8, 1928 Pinsk, Poland (now Belarus)
- Died: March 18, 2022 (aged 94) Bnei Brak, Israel
- Spouse: Batsheva Esther Kanievsky (m. 1951; died 2011)
- Children: 8
- Parents: Yaakov Yisrael Kanievsky (father); (Pesha) Miriam Karelitz (mother)

Religious life
- Religion: Judaism

Shemaryahu Yosef Chaim Kanievsky (Hebrew: שמריהו יוסף חיים קַניֶבסקִי; January 8, 1928 – March 18, 2022) was an Israeli Haredi rabbi and posek. He was a leading authority in Haredi Jewish society on legal and ethical practice. Known as the Gadol HaDor ("greatest of his generation") and the "Prince of Torah", much of his prominence came through Torah education and advice about Jewish law.

Though Kanievsky held no formal community-wide post, he was the de facto head of the Litvak community of Haredi Judaism, revered as a consummate scholar of Jewish law and tradition, with unimpeachable rulings.

== Biography ==
=== Early years and education ===
Kanievsky was born in Pinsk, then part of Poland, as the eldest son of Yaakov Yisrael Kanievsky and Pesha Miriam, sister of Avrohom Yeshaya Karelitz. In 1934, he emigrated with his family to Mandatory Palestine, and they settled in Bnei Brak.

At about fourteen, after one term at his father's Beit Yosef yeshiva, Kanievsky transferred to Lomza Yeshiva in Petah Tikva, then led by Reuven Katz. In a letter dated April 24, 1944, Katz described the sixteen-year-old Kanievsky as an exceptionally diligent student who knew at least three orders of the Talmud and had broad knowledge of the Rishonim and Acharonim. He later named Elazar Shach, Efraim Borodiansky, Eliyahu Dushnitzer and Yechiel Mordechai Gordon among his teachers there. Kanievsky recalled that Gordon encouraged students to interrupt his lectures with questions, bringing new energy to the yeshiva's Talmudic debate.

During the 1948 Arab–Israeli War, Kanievsky was assigned to guard duty while still a Lomza student.

On 7 Kislev 5712 (December 1951), Kanievsky married Batsheva Esther, daughter of Yosef Shalom Elyashiv. Reuven Katz officiated. The couple lived in Petah Tikva for several months before moving to Bnei Brak, where Kanievsky studied at the institution that became Kollel Chazon Ish.

=== Later work ===
In the late 1970s, Kanievsky edited the Tevuna commentary on the Jerusalem Talmud by Yitzchak Eizik Krasilschikov.

== Death and funeral ==
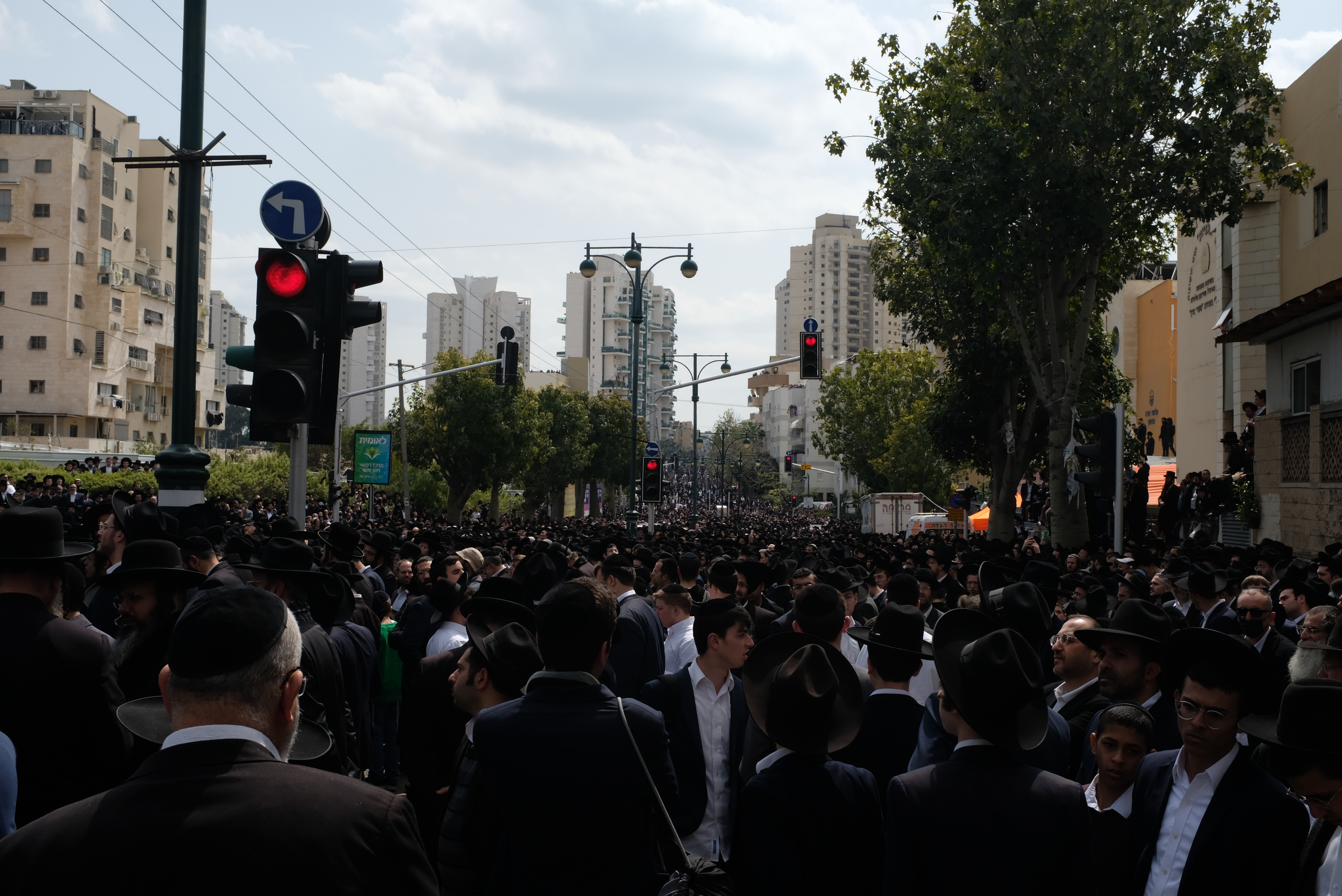
Funeral for Kanievsky in March 2022

Kanievsky died from cardiac arrest at his home on Friday, 15 Adar II 5782 (March 18, 2022).

His funeral was held two days later, on Sunday, 17 Adar II 5782 (March 20, 2022), in Bnei Brak. The funeral procession covered approximately one kilometer, beginning at his home on Rashbam Street and ending at the Shomrei Shabbos cemetery. According to the Israel Police, around 500,000 people attended, while the Bnei Brak Municipality estimated up to 750,000 participants, making it the second-largest funeral in Israel's history. The funeral received extensive advance coverage due to concerns about the large turnout and its potential impact on infrastructure and services in Gush Dan.

After his death, a dispute arose among his three sons over his estate. Following mediation conducted by the Beit Din Tzedek of Bnei Brak, an agreement was reached for equal division.

== Leadership in the Litvak community ==
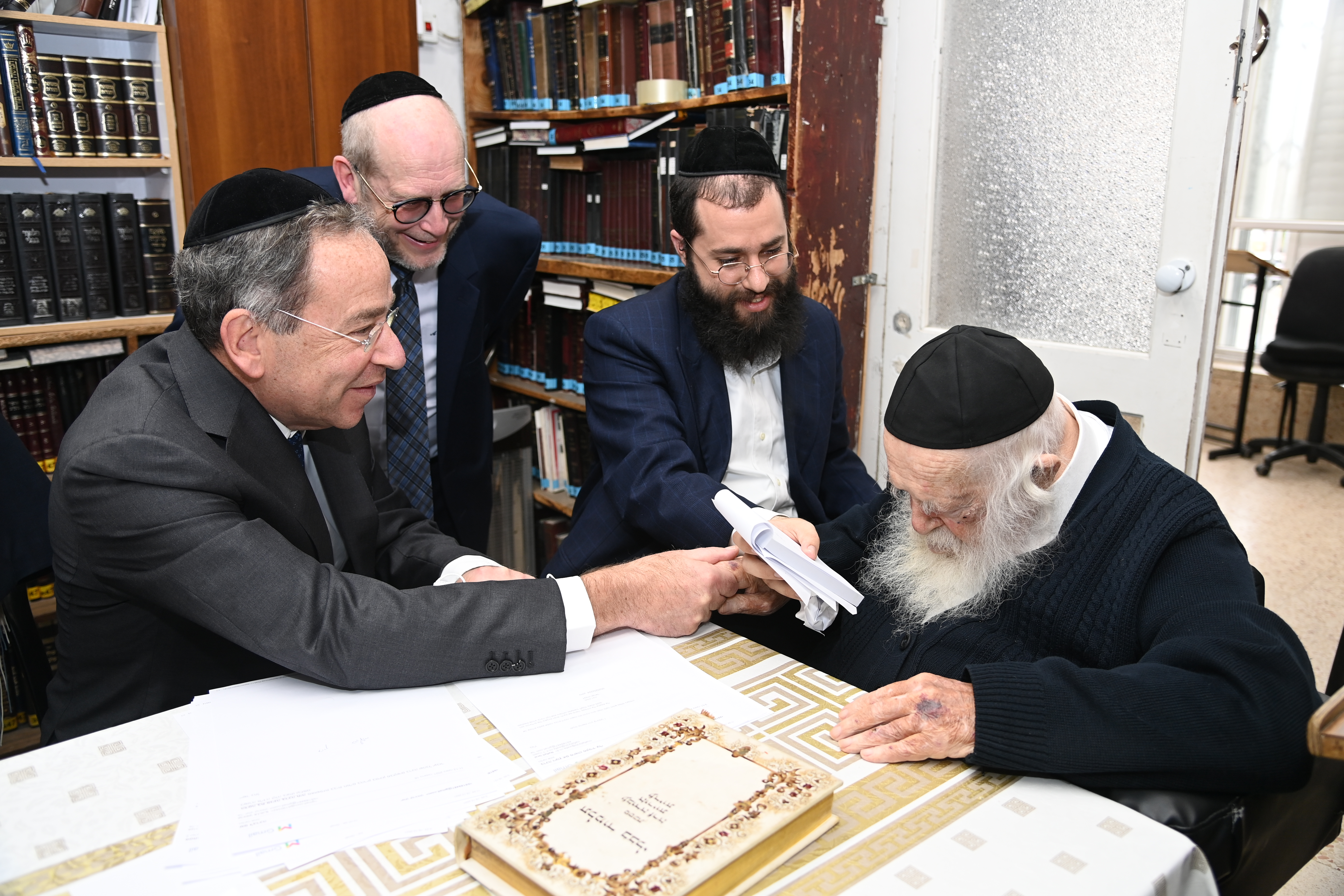
US Ambassador to Israel Thomas R. Nides visiting Kanievsky's home, December 2021

Kanievsky's public involvement began with the founding of the Degel HaTorah party in 1988. Elazar Shach invited him to appear by his side at the party's founding gathering at International Convention Center and included him in his travels to the event in Jerusalem. During an election rally held afterward, Shach requested that Kanievsky be brought from his home before he spoke, and he dedicated part of his speech to praising him and emphasizing the obligation to obey his directives. Among other things, Shach said about him:

"He is the greatest we have in the world."

When the Moetzes Gedolei HaTorah was formed, Kanievsky was asked to join. After he refused, Shach instructed that he be added alongside his father-in-law, Yosef Shalom Elyashiv, as a "non-member with an opinion," whose views should be considered even if he did not participate in the council's meetings.

During the Gulf War, it was stated in his name that no missiles would fall on Bnei Brak, based on a similar statement by his uncle Avrohom Karelitz. A similar assurance was issued in his name during the 2012 Gaza War.

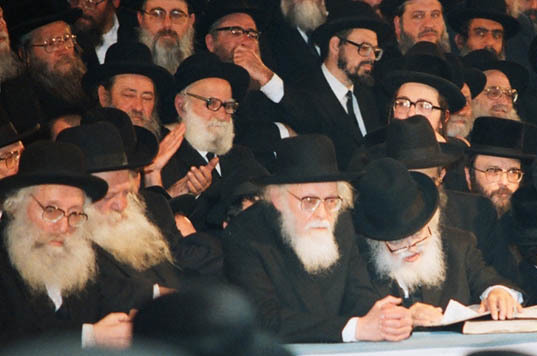
Kanievsky (second from left) at a Degel HaTorah conference, next to Yosef Shalom Elyashiv and Elazar Shach (1990).

In 2013, when the Jerusalem Faction ran in the 2013 Israeli municipal elections in three cities against Degel HaTorah, Kanievsky attended a council meeting to publicly support Degel HaTorah. During this time, he harshly criticized supporters and voters of the Bnei Torah party, calling them "empty and reckless dissenters." After the elections, he advised many to separate from Bnei Torah supporters in educational institutions and communities.

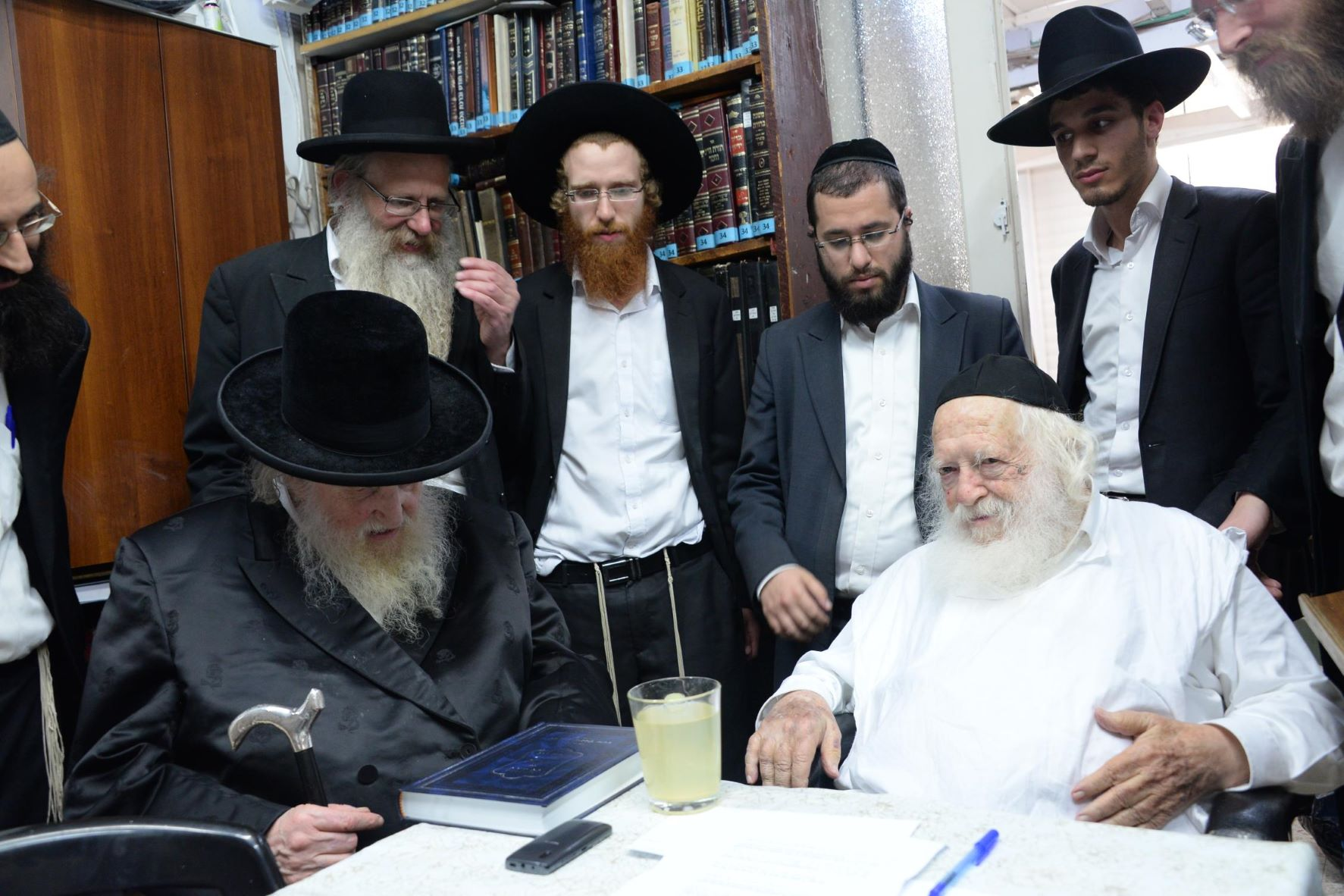
Kanievsky with Moshe Sternbuch

After his father-in-law died Kanievsky's involvement in the leadership of the Litvak community increased, and he supported the leadership actions of Aharon Leib Shteinman. During Elyashiv's last illness, a handwritten letter by Kanievsky was published in Yated Ne'eman, stating:

The leadership of the generation is now entrusted to the great Gaon, Aharon Yehuda Leib Shteinman, may he live many good days, whose actions are all for the sake of Heaven. And now we are fortunate that our great teacher, under the direction of my father-in-law, took upon himself the entire management of Yated Ne'eman, which my father established together with our great teacher Rabbi Elazar Menachem Shach of blessed memory.

After Shteinman's death in December 2017, Kanievsky's role in leading the Litvak Haredi community affiliated with Degel HaTorah increased. Alongside him in leadership stood Gershon Edelstein, head of Ponevezh Yeshiva, who led the party's Moetzes Gedolei HaTorah. From Adar 5778, Yated Ne'eman referred to him as "Rabban Shel Kol Bnei HaGolah" (meaning "Leader of all the Children of the Diaspora," a title reserved for the highest leader). In October 2018, before the 2018 Israeli municipal elections, he again participated in a Council of Torah Sages meeting.

== Rulings and opinions ==
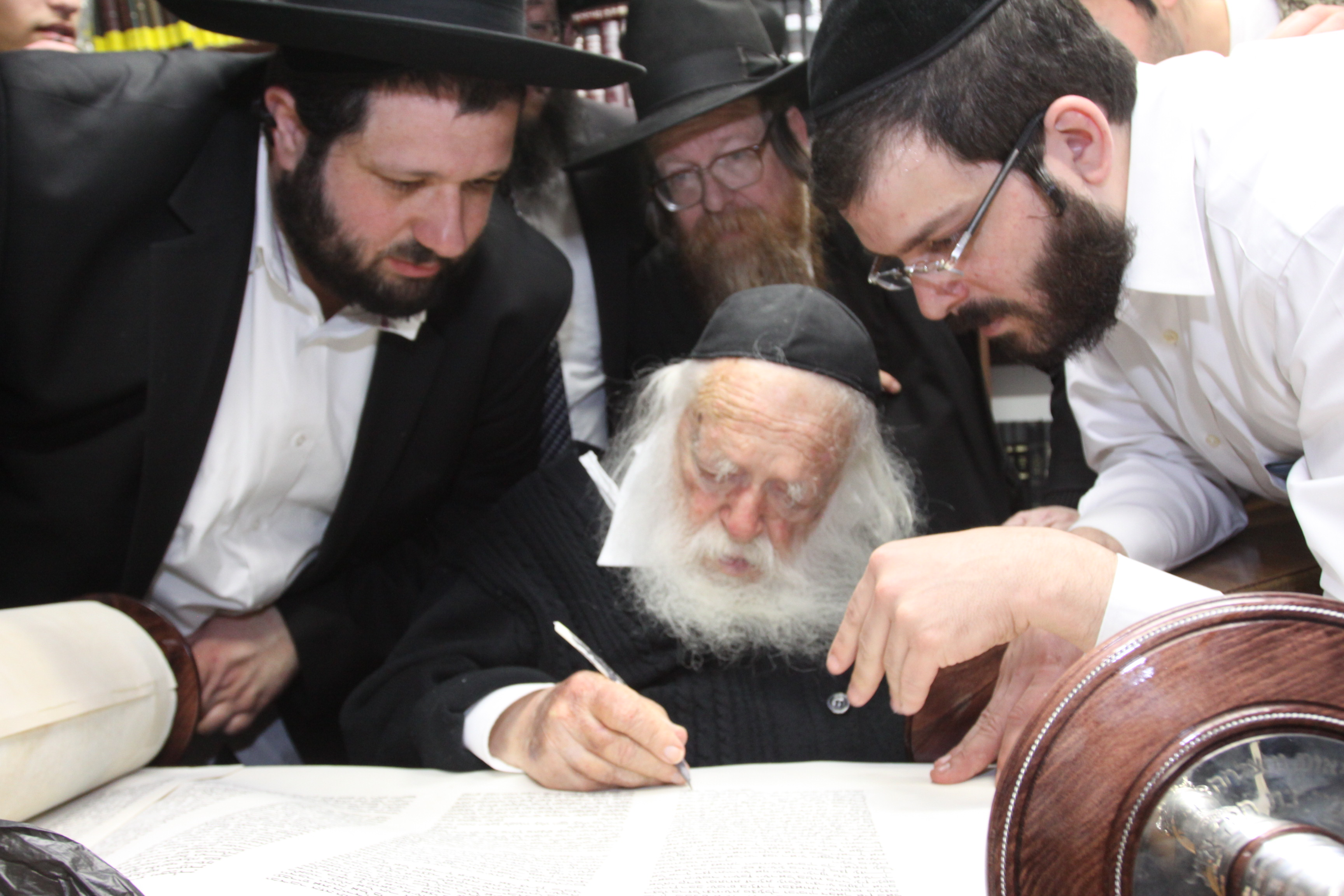
Kanievsky in 2014

Kanievsky took great effort to uphold the rulings and positions of Avrohom Karelitz, including: not relying on the heter mechira during the Shmita, prohibiting the use of electricity and water supplied through Shabbat desecration, not relying on city eruvs due to the difficulty of monitoring them from week to week, reading the Book of Esther in Bnei Brak also on Shushan Purim out of doubt, and more.

To many visitors, Kanievsky instructed growing a beard and placing payot in front of the ears, prohibiting men from wearing watches due to the prohibition of cross-dressing in halakha, wearing long-sleeved shirts, writing Torah compositions, and more.

He frequently advised people with various health issues to study Torah related to the nature of their ailment, either by its name or its content.

Another prominent practice of his was encouraging early marriage around the age of eighteen, a practice followed by many of his grandchildren.

In 2012, Kanievsky ruled that it is forbidden to possess or use a smartphone without individual permission from a posek, and that owners are not allowed to sell their phones, but should instead burn them. In 2015, he instructed United Hatzalah paramedics that in the event of a terrorist attack, they should not treat the terrorists before the victims, even if the terrorist is more seriously injured, and they may even leave the terrorist to die.

In 2016, Kanievsky declared that medical cannabis was kosher for Passover as long as the possession of the cannabis is not in violation of the law of the land.

In 2011, he interpreted Arab Spring uprisings as evidence that the Messiah may be near. In 2015, following the 2014 Jerusalem synagogue attack, he repeatedly referred to the imminent arrival of the Messiah, and urged diaspora Jews to make aliyah (immigrate to Israel), reportedly resulting in the arrival of a substantial number of French Jews. In February 2020, shortly before the Israeli legislative elections, it was reported by one rabbi that Kanievsky had stated that the coming of the Messiah was possibly imminent.

In 2017, Kanievsky ruled that reporting instances of sexual child abuse to the police is mandatory, consistent with halakha (Jewish law).

=== Covid-19 ===
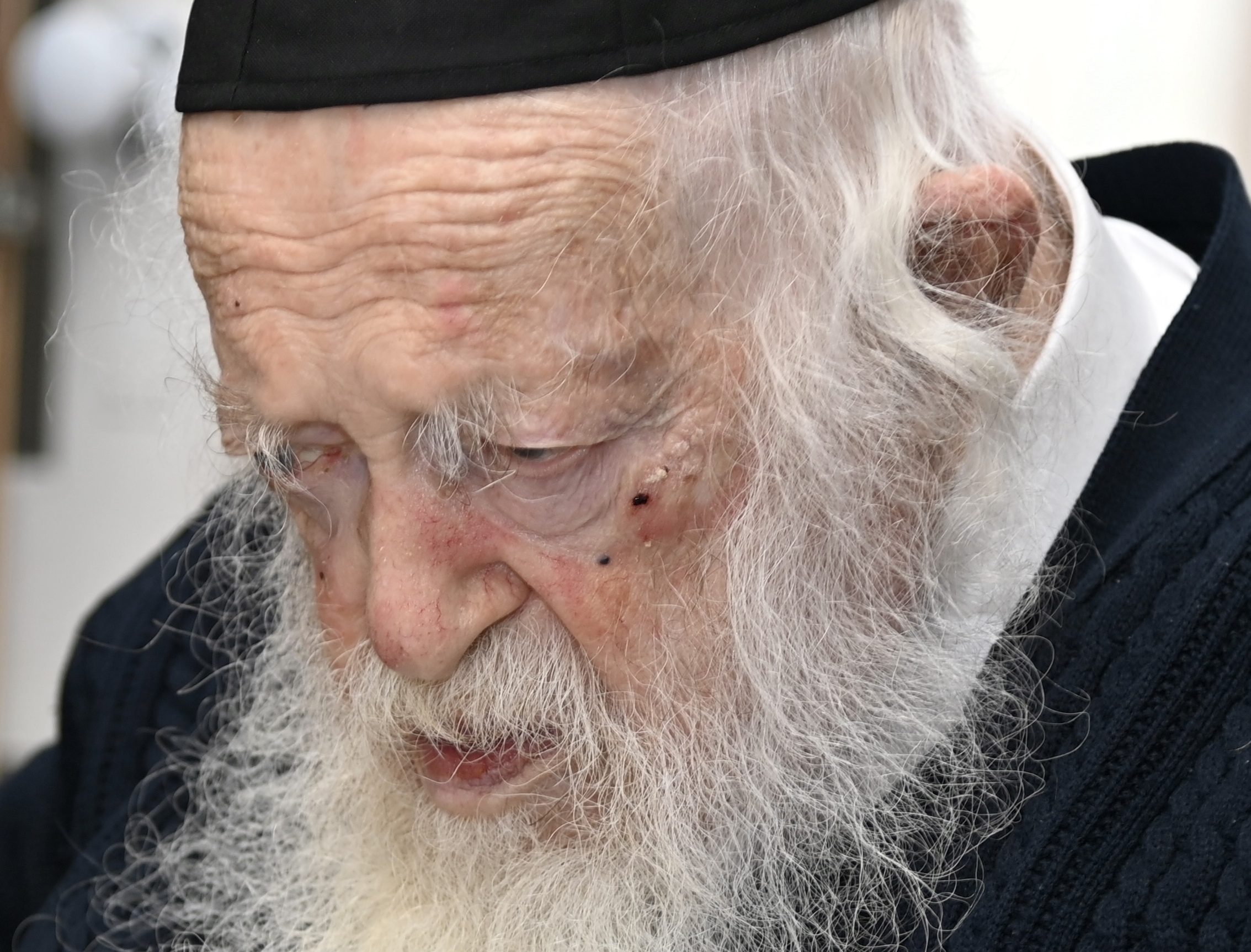
Kanievsky in December 2021

At the beginning of the COVID-19 pandemic in Israel (March 2020) and despite the Ministry of Health’s directive to close all educational institutions, Kanievsky instructed that yeshivas and Talmud Torahs remain open, saying the neglect of Torah was more dangerous. Kanievsky told his followers that the best ways to defeat the virus were to avoid lashon hara (gossiping about one's peers), to strengthen humility, and to place the needs of others before their own. As a result of the discussion, he was visited, on March 15, by senior police officials who, with great respect, wanted to ask him of the importance of following the orders of medical professionals with regard to the outbreak.

On March 29, after the ultra-Orthodox community was hit hard by the virus, with Bnei Brak having a high percentage of coronavirus cases in Israel, relative to its population, Kanievsky ruled that one who does not follow the Israeli Health Ministry's guidelines on COVID-19 is in the position of a rodef, i.e., one who pursues another with intent to kill, a murderer. He also ruled that telephones may be answered on Shabbat to get COVID-19 test results, and that minyanim must not meet at all during the pandemic – a stricter requirement than the Health Ministry's rules, which at the time allowed congregations to meet outdoors as long as participants are at least two meters (6 feet) distant from each other.

On October 2, 2020, Kanievsky was diagnosed with COVID-19. On October 28, 2020, his physician said Kanievsky had recovered from the virus.

In June 2021, he urged everyone, including ages 12–15, to get vaccinated against COVID-19.

During the second wave of the pandemic (October 2020), it was publicized in his name that the Talmud Torahs should reopen, contrary to government guidelines prohibiting it.

=== Responsa books from his answers ===
Kanievsky extensively responded to those who sought his guidance across all Torah topics. However, he generally based his answers on the rulings of earlier sages and rarely issued new decisions. His responses were typically brief, often consisting of only a few words. From his written and spoken responses, an extensive literature of responsa has developed. Around one hundred books include his answers to questions posed by authors. Some notable books dedicated to his responsa include:

- Daat Nota – A compilation of halachic answers organized according to the order of the Mishnah Berurah, with additional notes and clarifications from Kanievsky, as well as cross-references to other poskim added by an editorial team led by his son Yitzchak Shaul. Three volumes, 2009–2016. The series is expected to include around ten volumes.
- Derech Sichah – Questions on various topics arranged by the weekly Torah portion, compiled by his student Eliyahu Man (based on his weekly Shabbat meal discussions with Kanievsky), two volumes.
- Shama Tefilati – Explanations on the order of prayers based on his answers to Tzvi Yabrov, Bnei Brak, 2008.

In 2012, a book titled Me’Achorei HaPargod was published, featuring Torah insights and sayings on various topics from him and Rabbi Steinman.

Additionally, a weekly Shabbat bulletin called Divrei Shi’ach was published, containing responses and words of Torah from him over the past week.

== Family ==
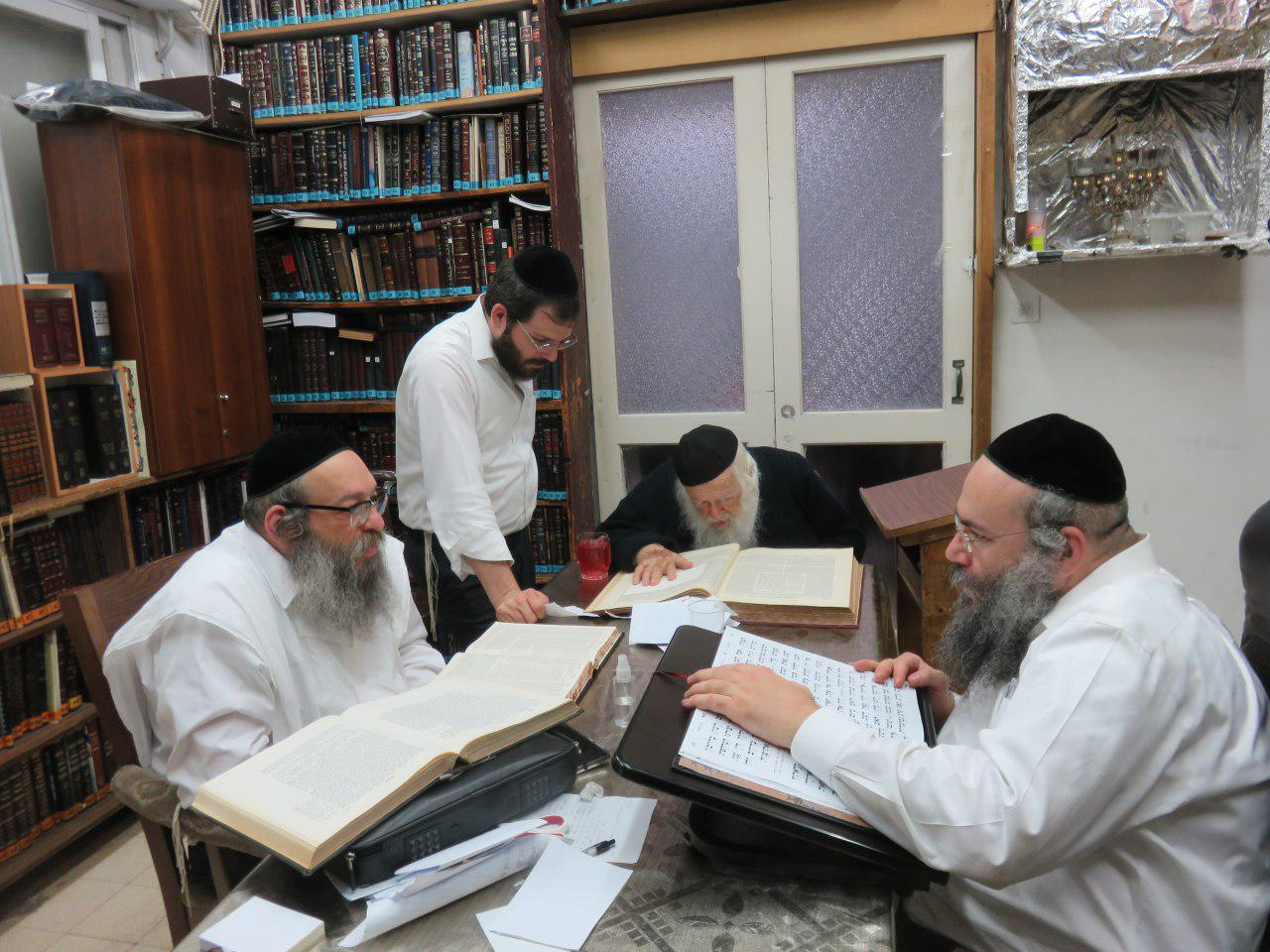
Kanievsky with his sons, Avraham Yeshayahu and Yitzchak Shaul

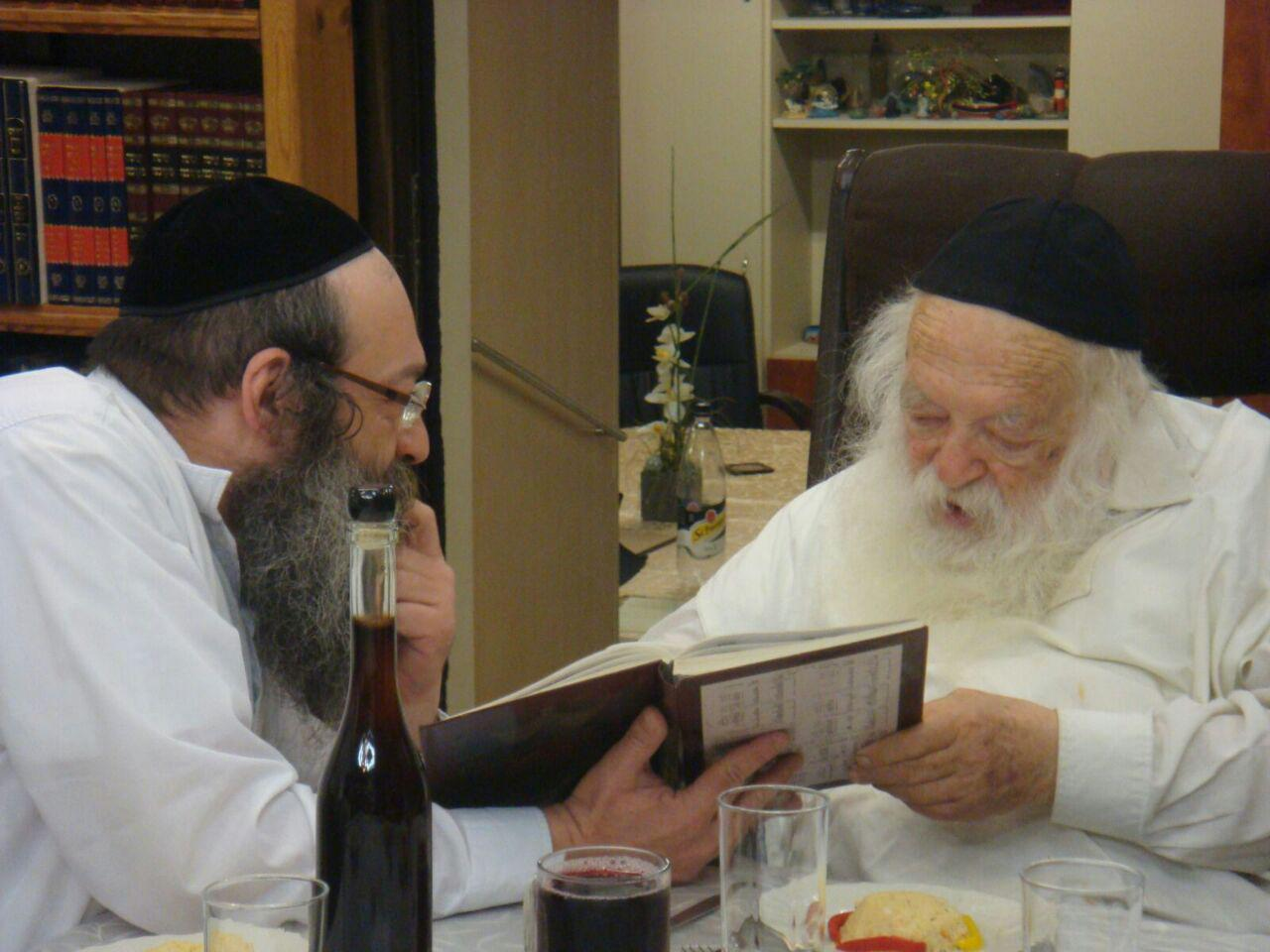
Kanievsky with his son, Avraham Yeshayahu

Kanievsky was married to Batsheva Kanievsky, daughter of Yosef Shalom Elyashiv, and was the father of five daughters and three sons. Two of his brothers-in-law are Yitzchok Zilberstein and Ezriel Auerbach.
