= Arzei HaBira =

Haredi Jewish neighborhood in Jerusalem

Coordinates: 31°47′35.09″N 35°13′25.44″E

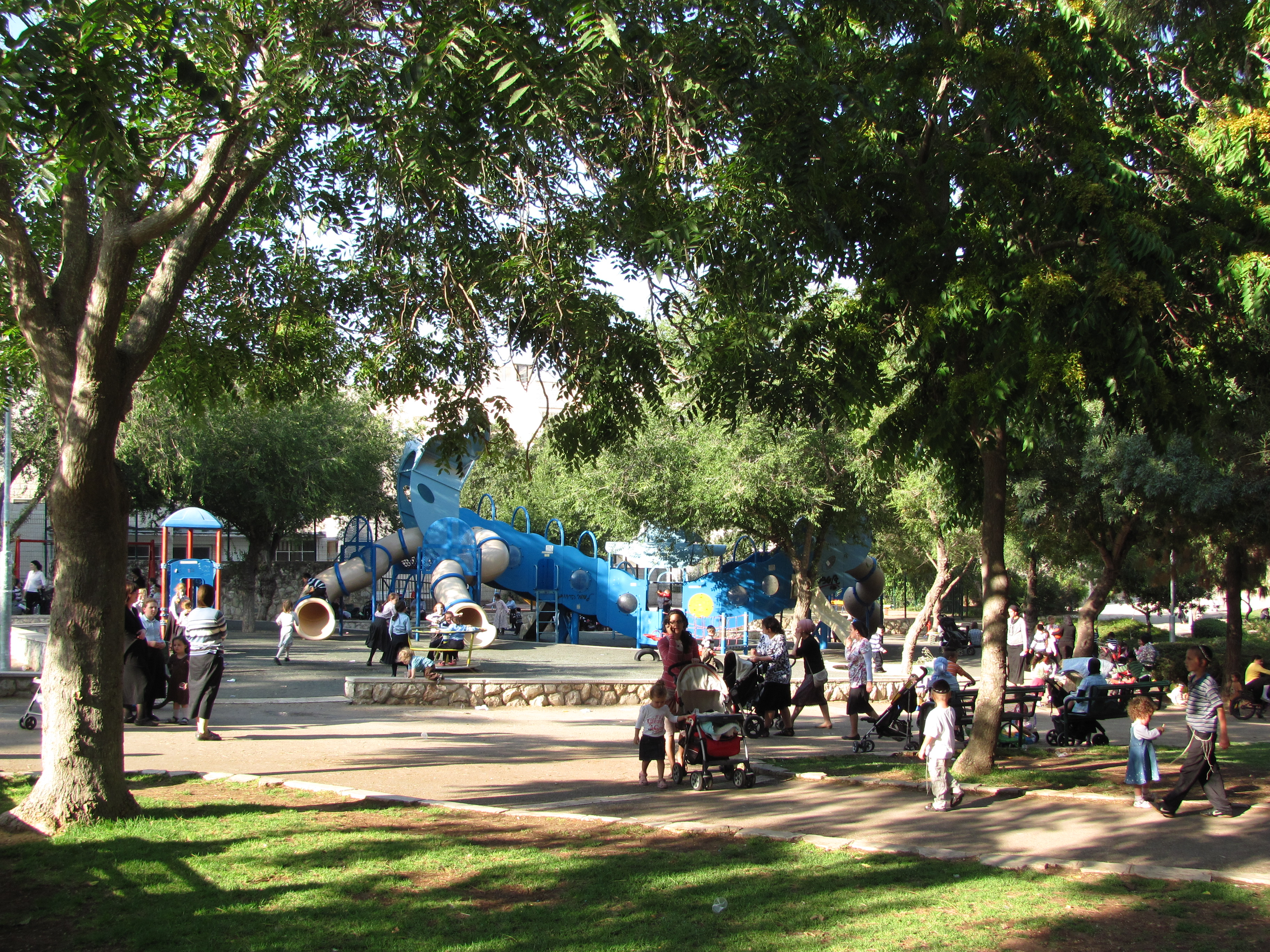
Arzei Habira's central playground.

Arzei Habira (Hebrew: ארזי הבירה) is a Haredi neighborhood in Jerusalem. It is bordered by Ma'alot Dafna to the north, Shmuel HaNavi to the west, Beit Yisrael to the south, and Road 1 and Sheikh Jarrah to the east.

== Etymology ==
Arzei Habira literally means "Cedars of the Capital", referring to Jerusalem.

== History ==
Arzei Habira was established after the 1967 Six-Day War in an area which had previously been classified as no-man's land bordering Ramat Eshkol. It was originally considered a sub-neighborhood of Ma'alot Dafna, which was developed around the same time, although it developed its own character and is now known as a separate neighborhood. It is a densely developed area of high quality apartment housing situated around a large, central grass park. It is home to more than 200 families.

== Archaeology ==
In 2012, construction work revealed the façade of a previously undiscovered burial cave. While excavation inside was not feasible, the intricate style of the facade, likely designed in the Attic style, indicates its probable association with a larger group of elaborate Jewish burial caves dating back to the late Second Temple period.

== Notable residents ==
- Mordechai Shakovitsky was the rabbi of Arzei Habira as well as the posek for neighboring Yeshivat Ohr Somayach from 1977 until his death in 1998.
- Yosef Efrati, aide to Rabbi Yosef Shalom Eliashiv
- Chaim Yaakov Goldvicht, rosh yeshiva, Kerem B'Yavneh
- Yaakov Hillel
- Chaim Tzvi Yair Senter, rosh yeshiva, Yeshiva Aderes HaTorah
- Hanoch Teller
