= Nachum Eisenstein =

Nachum Eisenstein (Hebrew: נחום אייזנשטיין) is the rabbi of the Ma'alot Dafna neighborhood, Jerusalem, Israel. He is one of Rabbi Yosef Shalom Eliashiv's foremost disciples.

American-born Eisenstein heads the International Rabbinical Committee on Conversion. The international Rabbinical Committee on Conversion lost its reputation due to many controversies regarding one of its leading rabbis. The committee was originally started by Rabbi Chaim Kreiswirth, Chief Rabbi of Antwerp, Belgium. Eisenstein is an advocate for creating halachic standards in determining the status of a conversion to Judaism.

Rabbi Eisenstein has been a frequent guest on David Lichtenstein's podcast Headlines, which is devoted to contemporary Halachic issues. He has appeared on more than 15 episodes, often sharing Rabbi Elyashiv's views on the topics. One episode included interviews with Rabbi Eisenstein and Rabbi David Stav, highlighting their opposing views on conversion to Judaism in contemporary Israel.
