= Shmuel HaNavi (neighborhood) =

Neighbourhood in Jerusalem

Coordinates: 31°47′42″N 35°13′20″E

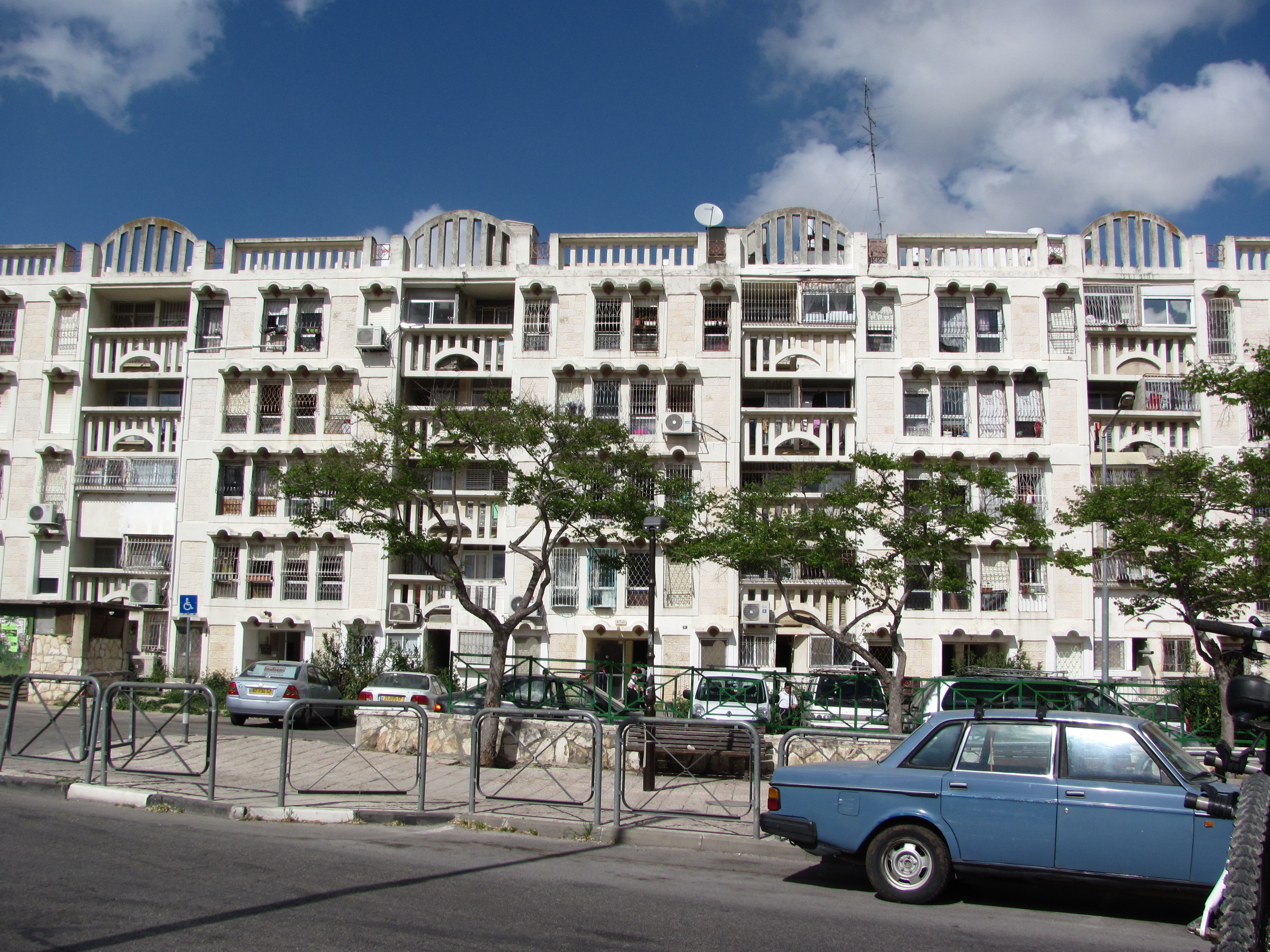
Shmuel HaNavi apartments

Shmuel HaNavi (Hebrew: שיכון שמואל הנביא, Shikun Shmuel HaNavi, lit. "Samuel the Prophet neighborhood") is a neighborhood in north-central Jerusalem. It is bordered by the Sanhedria Cemetery to the north, Maalot Dafna to the east, Arzei HaBira to the south, and the Bukharan Quarter to the west. It is named after Shmuel HaNavi (Samuel the Prophet) Street, which runs along its western border and is the main road leading to the tomb of Samuel the prophet (Hebrew: Shmuel HaNavi) just outside Jerusalem's city limits.

== Background ==
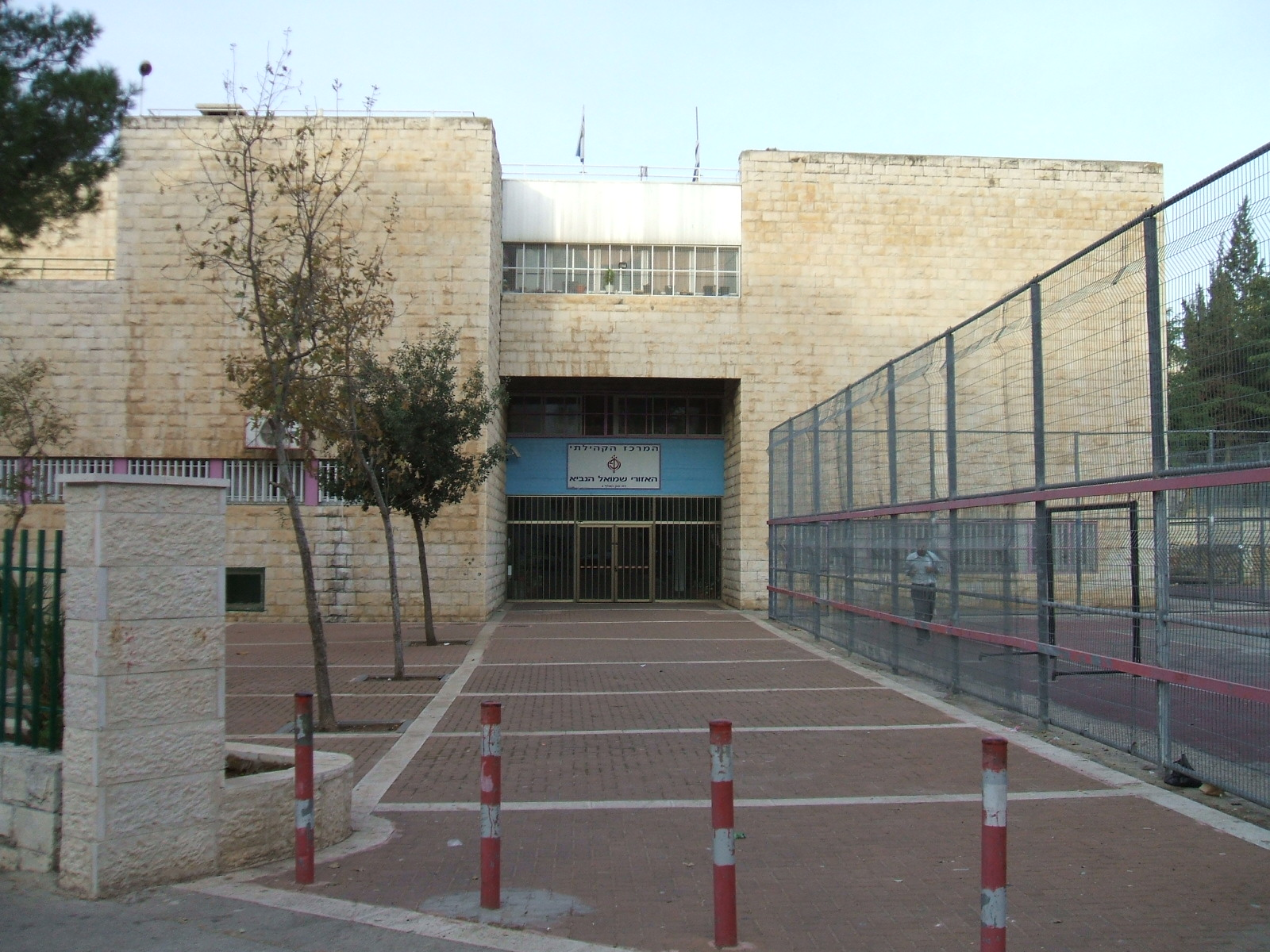
Community centre

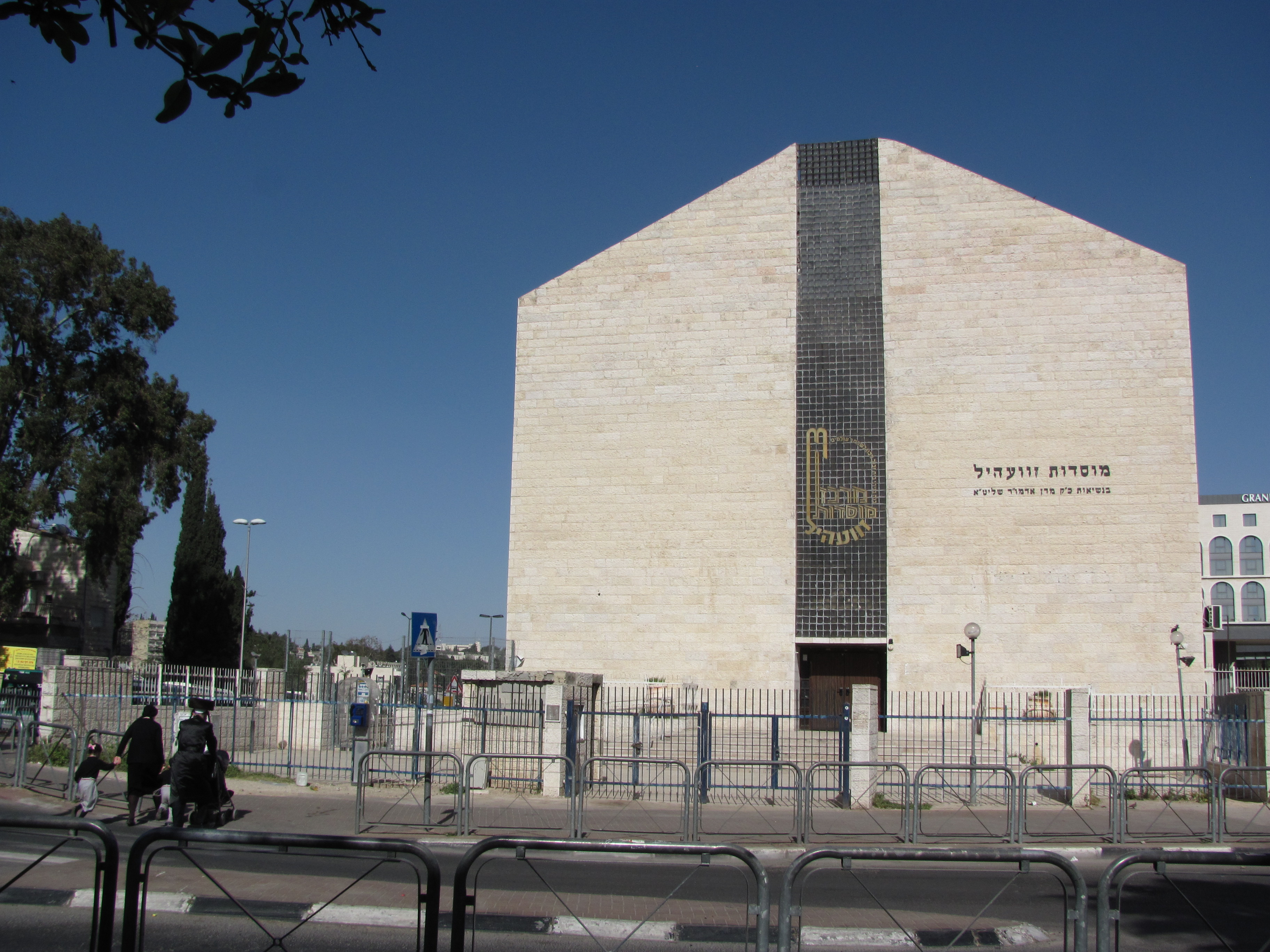
Zhvill yeshiva in the neighborhood

The first home to be erected on what would become known as Shmuel HaNavi Street was the Mandelbaum House, a large, three-story house built by Simcha Torever-Mandelbaum, a Jerusalem textile merchant, in 1927. Mandelbaum chose the location at the eastern end of the street, facing Sheikh Jarrah, with a desire to expand the northern boundary of Jewish Jerusalem at that time. In 1941, the Jerusalem Biblical Zoo, initially a small children's zoo on Harav Kook Street in central Jerusalem, was moved to a 4.5 dunams (0.45 ha) tract at the eastern end of Shmuel HaNavi Street before relocating to the campus of the Hebrew University on Mount Scopus in 1947. Houses built at the eastern end of the street before 1948 were largely inhabited by poor families and subject to sniper fire from Sheik Jarrah during the 1947 civil war. When war broke out in 1948, Shmuel HaNavi Street became a strategic gateway for Arab Legionnaires seeking to enter Jewish Jerusalem. The Mandelbaum House was used by the Haganah as a military stronghold and was partially blown up by the Arab Legion.

The 1949 Armistice Agreements put Shmuel HaNavi Street parallel to the Jordanian border, with a no man's land of barbed wire and minefields separating it from Ammunition Hill to the northeast. From 1949 to 1967 the official crossing point between Israeli- and Jordanian-held territory stood at the eastern end of Shmuel HaNavi Street at a checkpoint called the Mandelbaum Gate. This checkpoint was named after the destroyed Mandelbaum House, whose ruins lay nearby.

== New construction ==
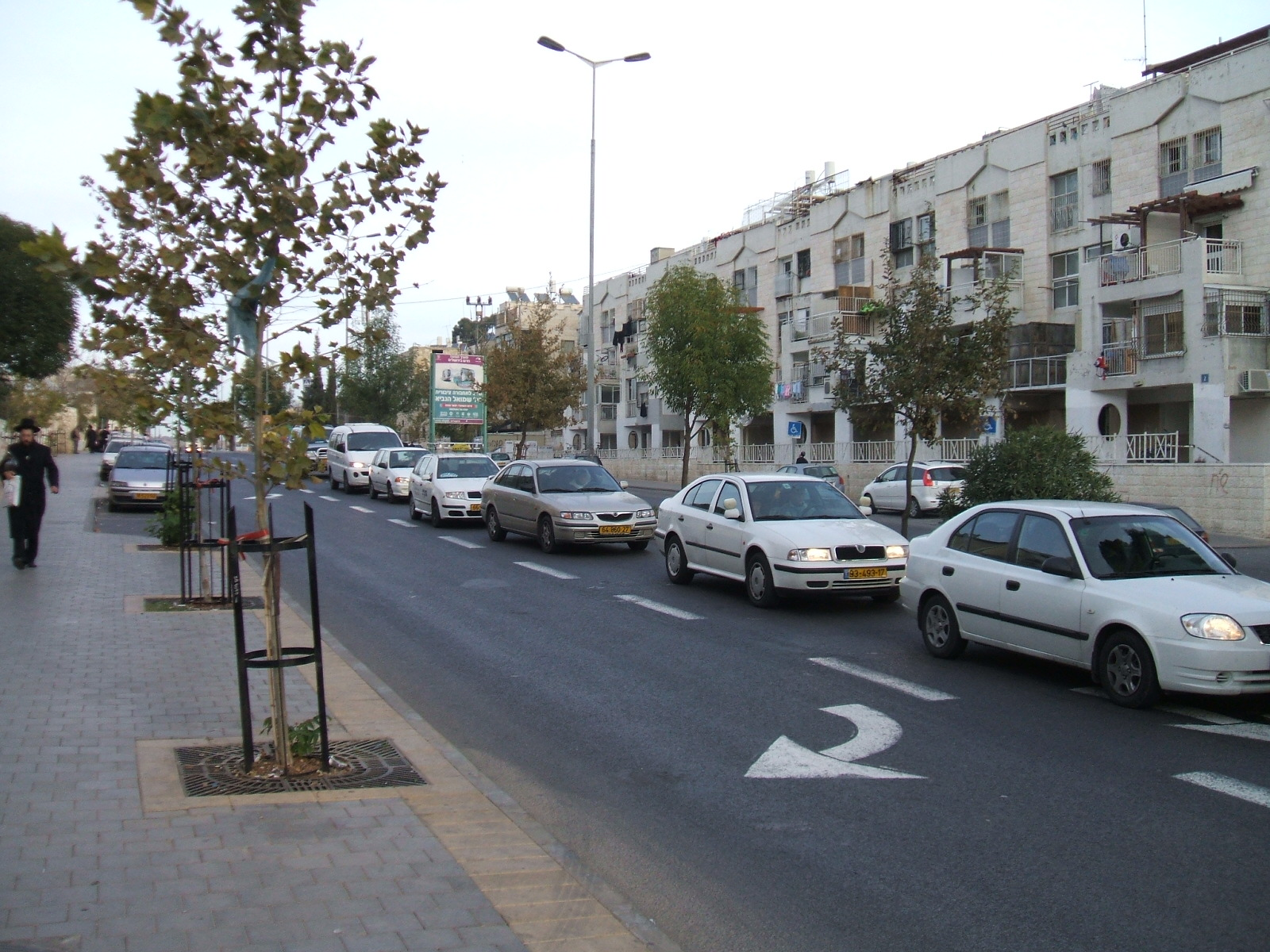
Shmuel HaNavi Street.

In the 1950s the new state of Israel struggled to absorb large numbers of immigrants, moving them out of temporary tents and huts into permanent apartments. Shmuel HaNavi was one of the neighborhoods built to accommodate these immigrants. Constructed in the early 1960s, it was situated next to the 1949 armistice line that ran parallel to Shmuel HaNavi Street, in order to reinforce the city's hold on its northern border.

Considering the location, the complex of "long train" tenement buildings were built in the manner of fortresses. The buildings were erected on a base of reinforced concrete and the walls were finished in rough stone, since this type of material could be handled by hundreds of unskilled workers. The Israel Housing Ministry mandated that the external concrete walls of the buildings be three times the normal thickness to withstand shelling. The roofs of the buildings had raised parapets fitted with gun slots. The buildings themselves were arranged in a "confusing zig-zag pattern" to slow down Arab armies that might charge the complex, and the courtyards between the buildings were designed to accommodate mass mobilization of Israeli troops in the event of an attack. For many years, residents barricaded their building entrances with sandbags and reinforced or blocked windows exposed to the border with Jordan.

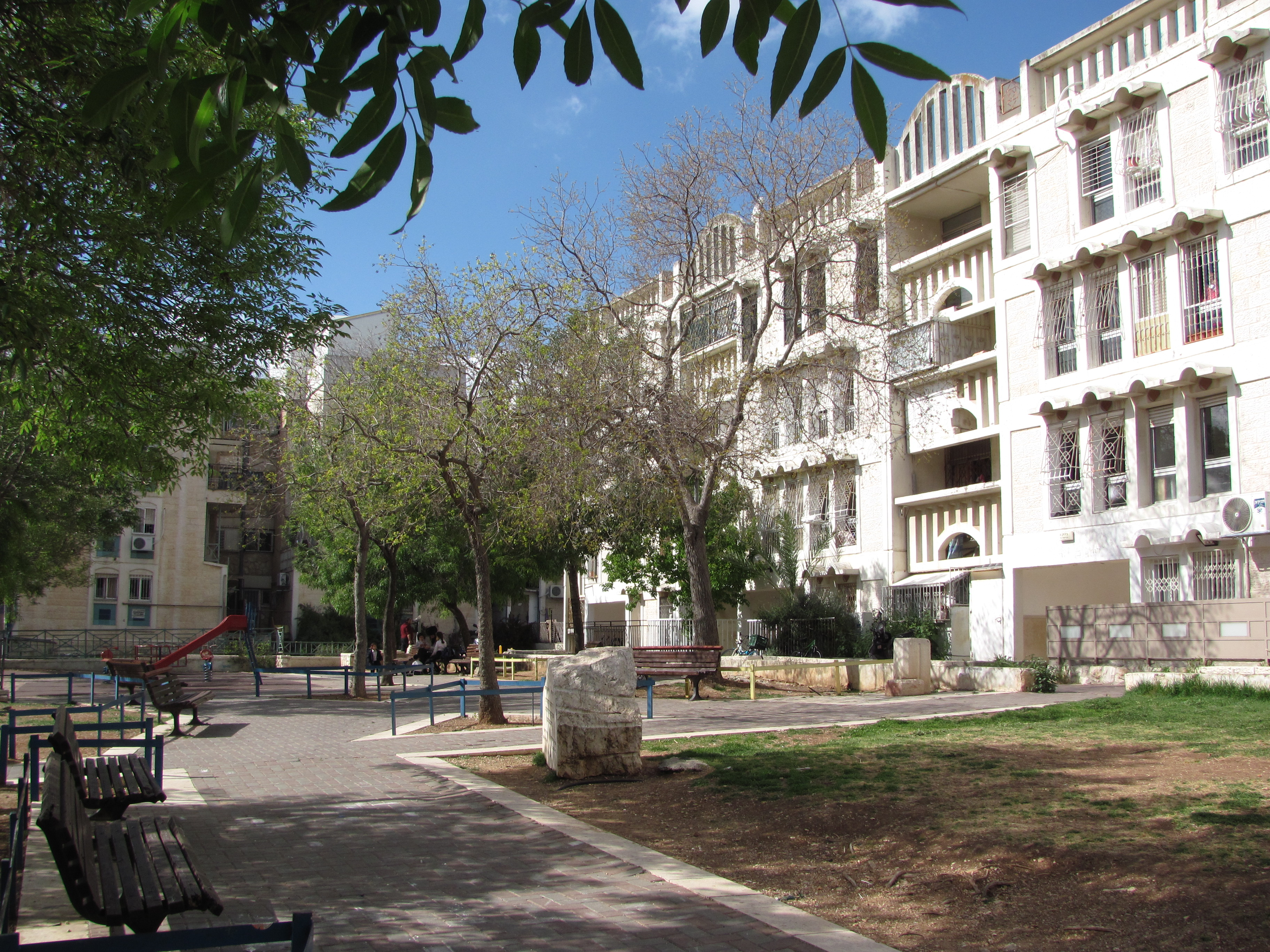
Large courtyards in front of the buildings in Shmuel HaNavi.

The project was largely populated by Sephardi Jewish immigrants from North Africa. The buildings – each "four stories in height, 32 apartments to a building, containing small flats of 70 meters housing large families" – suffered from overcrowding and lack of infrastructure, and quickly turned into a slum.

=== Urban protest movement ===
By the late 1970s, when the population had reached 4,000, a significant number of youth had dropped out of school and organized themselves into gangs. In response, Ohalim, an urban protest movement that promoted "positive activity" among disadvantaged immigrant populations in Jerusalem, established a community council in Shmuel HaNavi, along with similar councils in Nachlaot, Baka, and Kiryat Yovel, between 1977 and 1981. The Shmuel HaNavi branch called itself Ohel Shmuel. It "organized neighborhood clean-up campaigns, helped rid one of the buildings of prostitutes, organized cultural activities and holiday celebrations, initiated activities for the elderly, helped involve marginal youth in productive activity by setting up a lighting fixture factory for them, and organized learning centers for children and youth".

=== Project Renewal upgrade ===
In 1968, a year after the Six-Day War and the reunification of Jerusalem, a community center opened in the neighborhood. Shmuel HaNavi underwent a significant upgrade under Project Renewal, a national urban renewal program that upgraded housing, infrastructure and utilities in 84 Israeli neighborhoods between 1977 and 1984. A new facade was added to each building in the complex, and apartments were enlarged and even combined to create larger living quarters. The Jewish Agency for Israel, a Project Renewal co-partner, paired cities in the United States with Israeli neighborhoods slated for rehabilitation; Washington, D.C. was twinned with Shmuel HaNavi.

== Demography ==
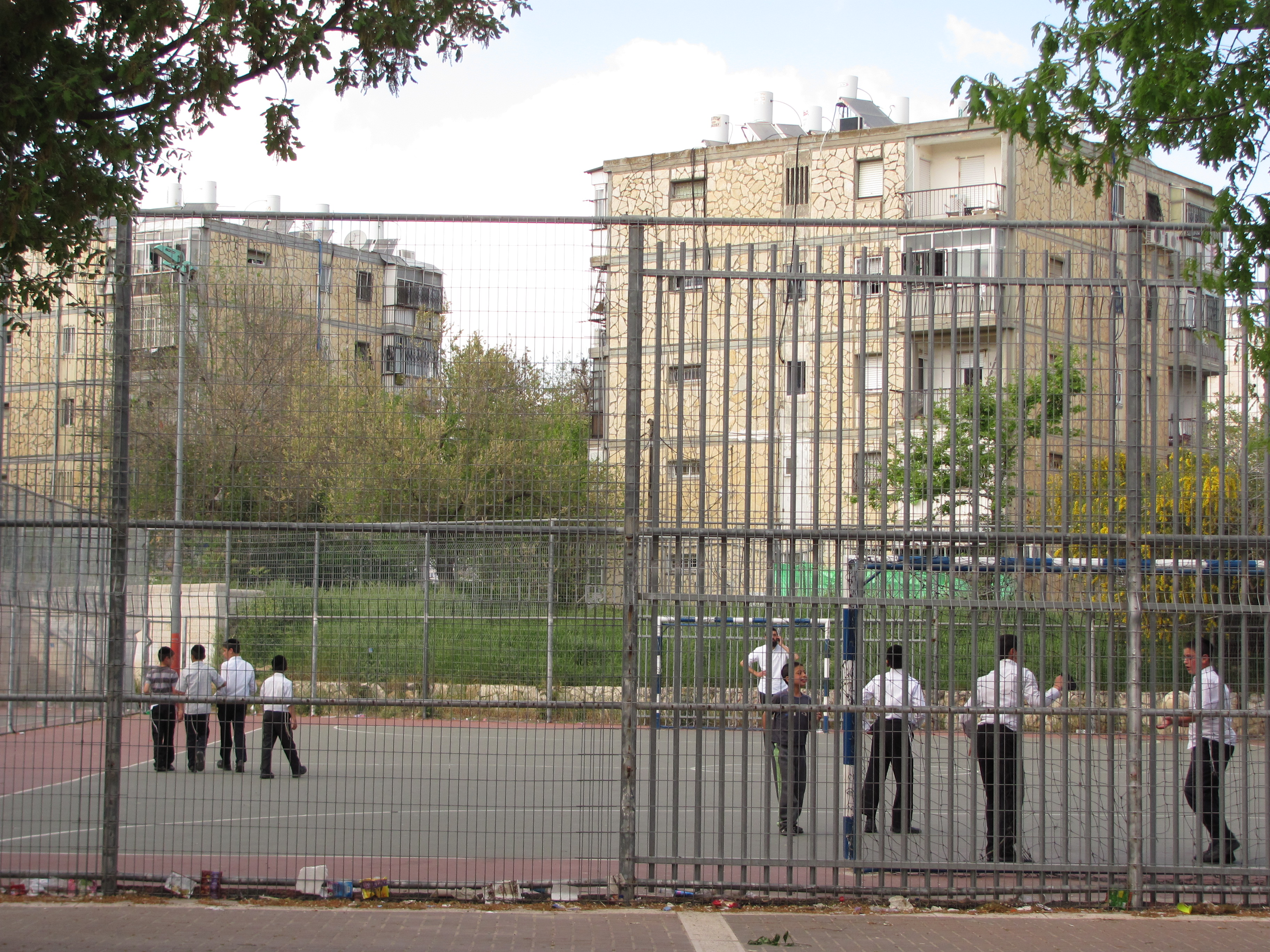
Haredi boys play on the Shmuel HaNavi sports field adjacent to the community center.

As the first generation of immigrant children matured and left the neighborhood, their parents followed, and Haredi families from Mea Shearim, Bukharim and Geula took their place. Today the Shmuel HaNavi neighborhood is largely Haredi. The neighborhood has deteriorated over the past number of decades, however, due to the low socioeconomic level of its residents. In 2007, a 3-room apartment was selling for $70,000 to $100,000.

== Archaeology ==
Sanhedrin Park, north of the Shmuel HaNavi-Bar Ilan intersection, contains burial caves from the Second Temple period. In 2009, archaeologists discovered an ancient quarry dating to the end of the Second Temple period (c. 2,030 years old) on Shmuel HaNavi Street near the Shmuel HaNavi neighborhood. According to the Israel Antiquities Authority, the immense size of the stones suggests that they were destined for use in the construction projects of King Herod, including the Temple. The Shmuel HaNavi quarry is part of a series of stone quarries stretching over the entire slope, from Musrara to Sanhedria.

== Notable residents ==
- Eliyahu Amedi, a yeshiva student whose 1986 murder sparked five days of anti-Arab rioting in and around the Old City.
- Yaakov Yosef, rabbi, rosh yeshiva, and former Knesset member for the Shas party
- Puah Shteiner, author of Forever My Jerusalem

== See also ==
- Shmuel HaNavi bus bombing
- Nebi Samuel
