= Batsheva Kanievsky =

Rebbetzin from Bnei Brak, Israel

Rebbetzin Batsheva Kanievsky

Personal life
- Born: Batsheva Esther Elyashiv; February 1, 1932 Jerusalem, Israel
- Died: October 15, 2011 (aged 79) Bnei Brak, Israel
- Buried: Zichron Meir, Bnei Brak
- Spouse: Chaim Kanievsky (m. 1951)
- Children: 8
- Parent(s): Yosef Shalom Elyashiv; Shaina Chaya Eliashiv

Religious life
- Religion: Judaism
- Denomination: Haredi Judaism

Batsheva Esther Kanievsky (Hebrew: בת-שבע קנייבסקי; February 1, 1932 – October 15, 2011), known as Rebbetzin Kanievsky, was a rebbetzin (rabbi's wife) from Bnei Brak, Israel. She was the wife of Chaim Kanievsky, and the oldest daughter of Yosef Shalom Eliashiv. Her grandfather was Aryeh Levin. More than 50,000 people attended her funeral.
