= Ma'alot Dafna =

Israeli settlement in the West Bank

Coordinates: 31.796209°N 35.225687°E

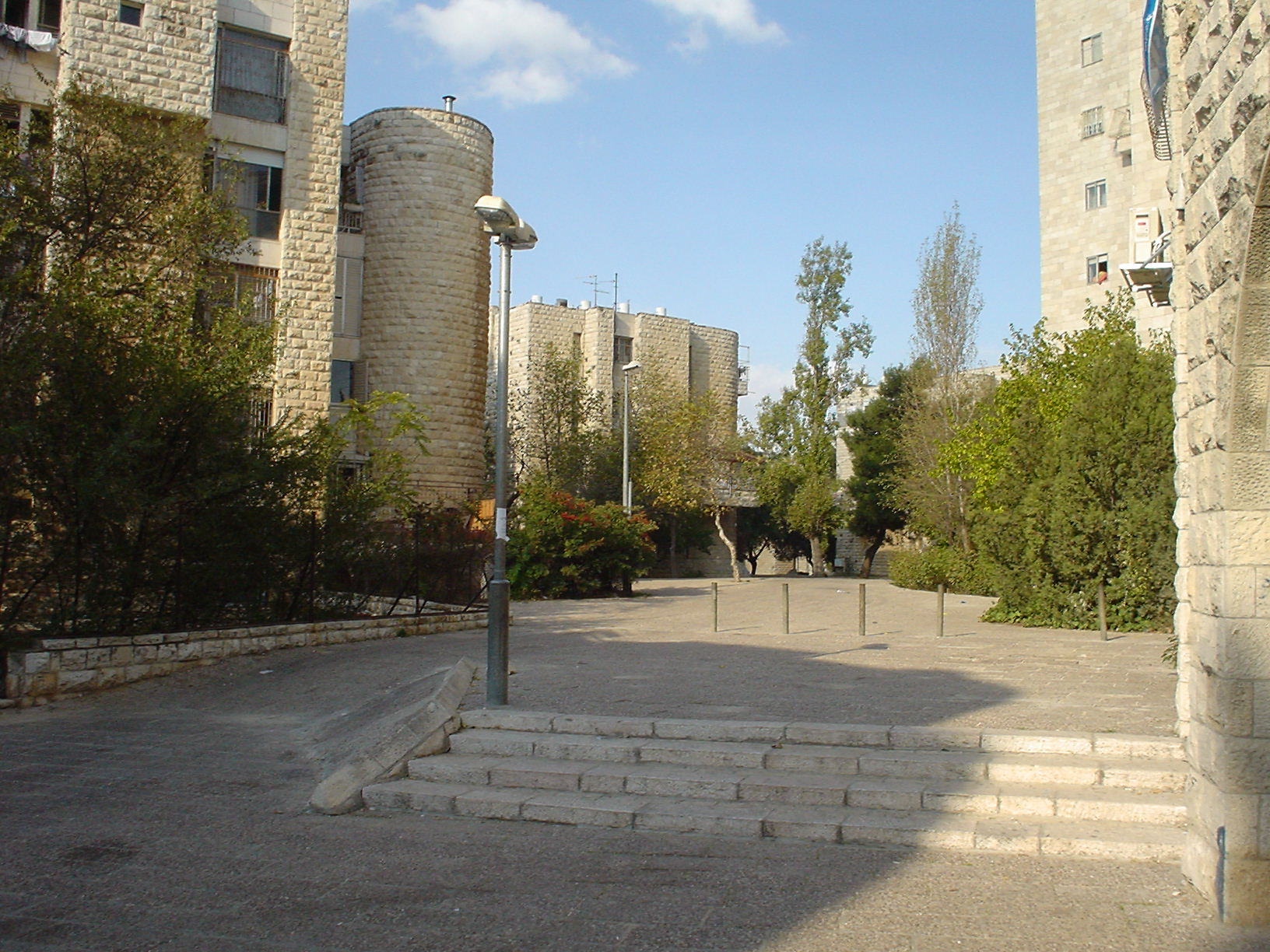
Pedestrian passage in Ma'alot Dafna

Ma'alot Dafna (Hebrew: מעלות דפנה) is an Israeli settlement and a neighborhood in East Jerusalem. It borders the neighborhood of Shmuel HaNavi to the west, Ammunition Hill to the east, Ramat Eshkol to the north and Arzei HaBira to the south.

The international community considers Israeli settlements in East Jerusalem illegal under international law, but the Israeli government disputes this.

== History ==
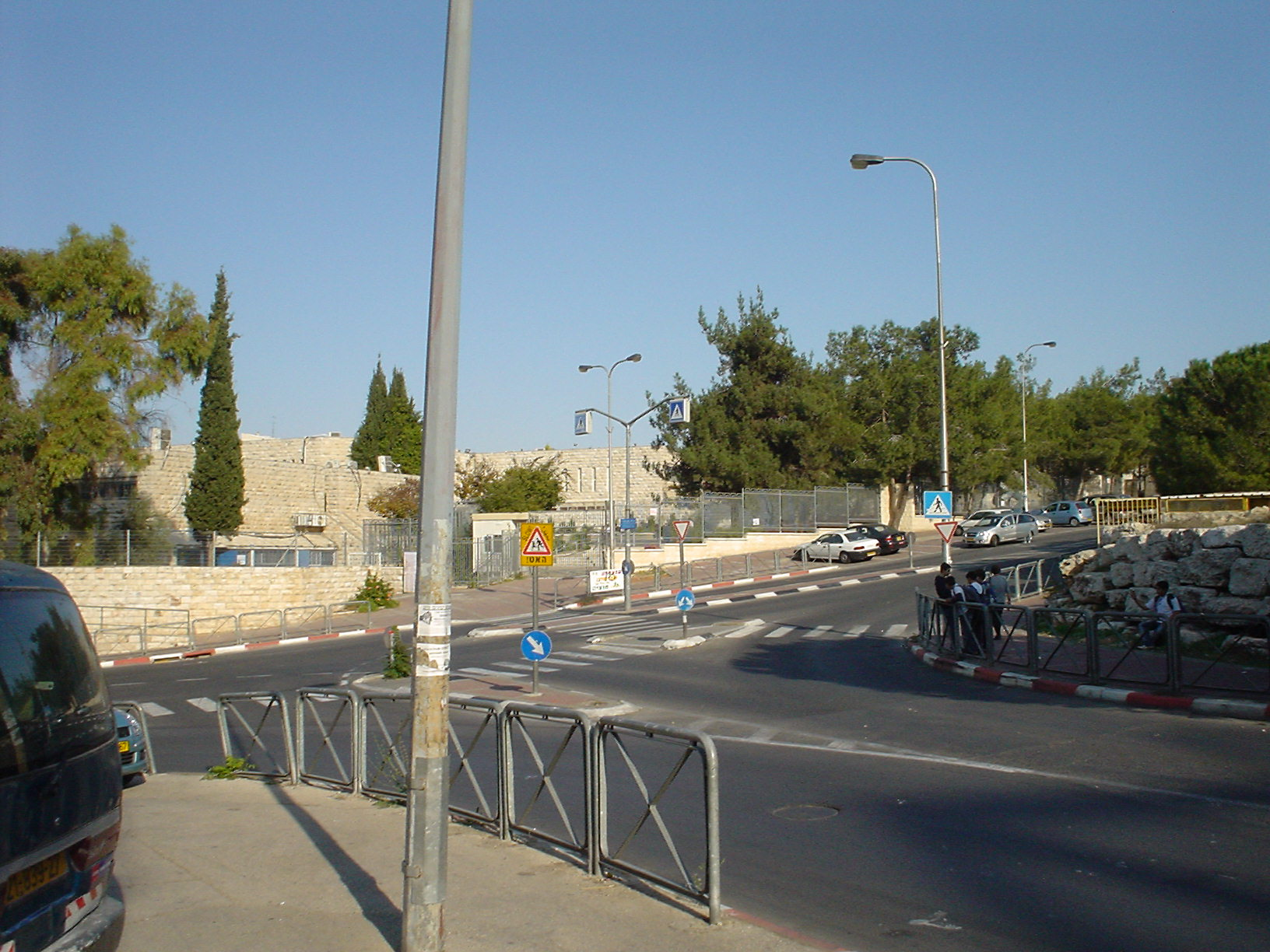
A view from Ma'alot Dafna to the René Cassin school.

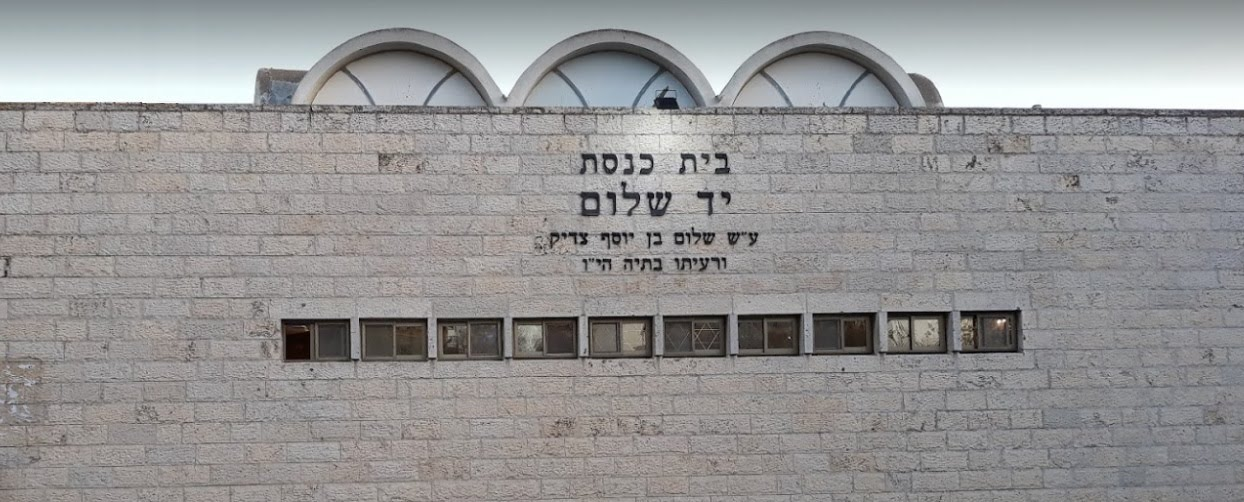
Yad Shalom synagogue

Ma'alot Dafna was established in 1972 on the hillside through which Israeli troops in the Six-Day War made their way from the Israeli neighborhood of Shmuel HaNavi to fight the Arab Legion troops at the Battle of Ammunition Hill. Its name, translated to "Bay Laurel Heights", commemorates Israel's victory in that war, the Bay laurel being a symbol of victory.

The name Ma'alot Dafna also refers to the ma'alot (Hebrew for "steps") up to the dafna (Hebrew for overlapping rose petals), referring to the layered hills and the stepped approach to it.

The neighborhood includes a sub-neighborhood called Arzei HaBira (Cedars of the Capitol), which was built on territory on the Israeli side of the armistice line before the war. Arzei HaBira is now considered a separate neighborhood, with more than 200 families. The rest of Ma’alot Dafna was built on territory that had been either no man's land or land used by the Jordanian military.

Ma'alot Dafna was built as part of the sequence of Jewish neighborhoods called the bariah or "hinge" neighborhoods connecting West Jerusalem to Mount Scopus. In July 1967, Prime Minister Levi Eshkol gave a clerk named Yehuda Tamir unusual authority to overlook governmental building license policy in order to speed up the establishment of the "hinge" neighborhoods (Ma’alot Dafna, Ramat Eshkol, Givat HaMivtar, and French Hill). The neighborhood was designed so that it could serve the adjacent neighborhood of Shmuel HaNavi, a poorly designed and problematic lower-class neighborhood, which until the Six Day War faced a large enemy fort.

== Demographics ==
Ma'alot Dafna now has a population of about 420 families, of which 220 are Anglo-born and 200 are Israeli. Most of the Anglo community consists of American Haredi couples who come to Israel for one or more years of kollel study at the nearby Mir yeshiva. The latter group creates a high turnover rate in the Anglo community.

== Architecture ==
Ma’alot Dafna is a small neighborhood, originally built for a population of 4,000 (1,400 apartments)), by the contractor company “Shikun U'Pituakh”; chief of architects Y. Drexler. It initially consisted entirely of four-story apartment houses of two to three bedrooms per apartment. The buildings are faced with Jerusalem stone and include architectural elements typical to the Old City of Jerusalem, as well as modern ones. The neighborhood has large areas reserved for pedestrian traffic.

== Notable institutes ==
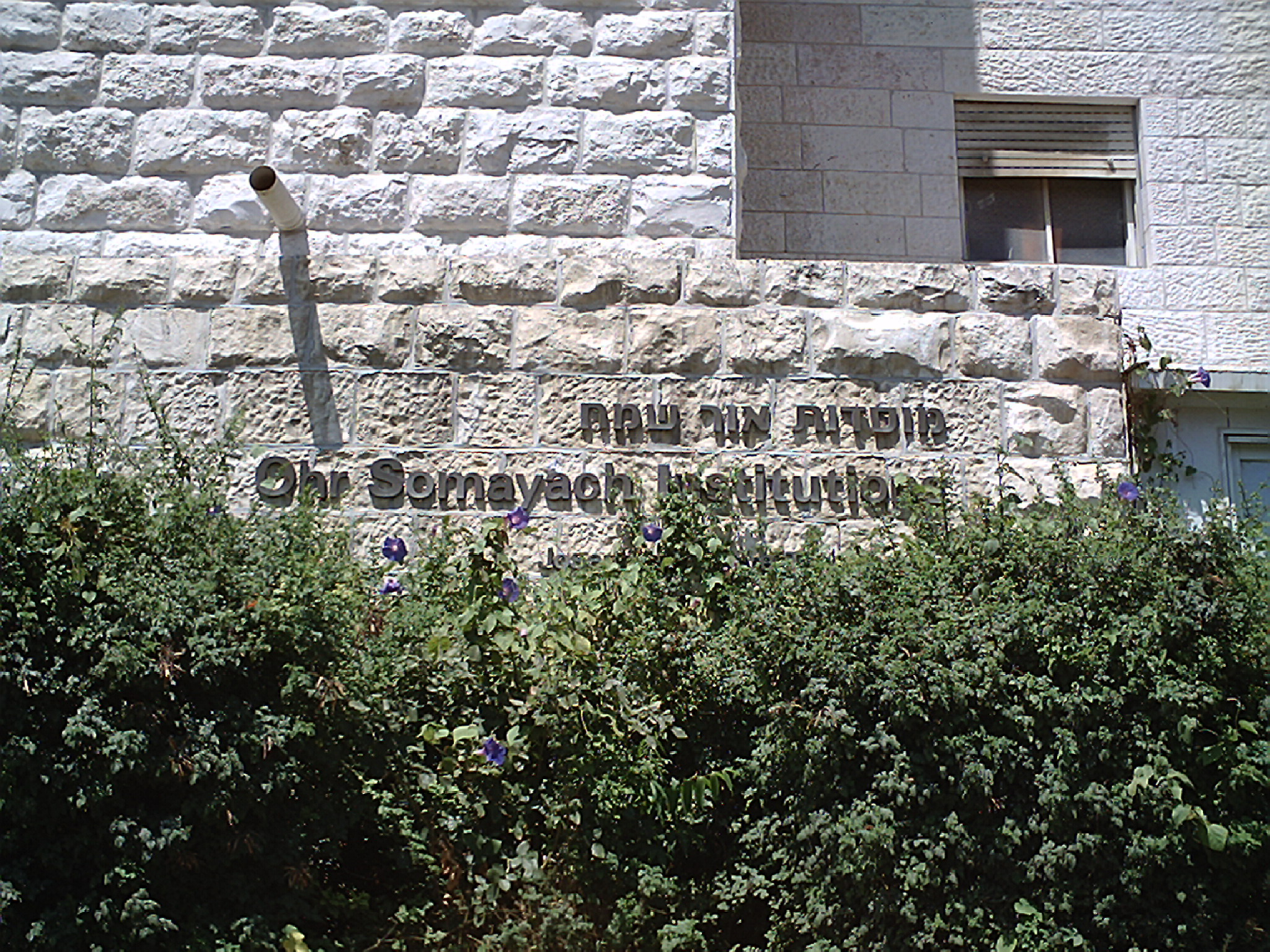
One of the buildings of the Ohr Somayach yeshiva.

- René Cassin High School serves the secular population of the northern Jerusalem neighborhoods. In its heyday, it had 60 classes of 40 students each. Its students learned three languages: Hebrew, English and French.
- Yeshivat Ohr Somayach is one of the most notable yeshivas in Jerusalem for baal teshuva men.
- The Jerusalem offices of United Nations Interim Force in Lebanon

== Notable people ==
- Nachum Eisenstein
