= Culturally Responsive Positive Behavior Interventions and Supports =

Culturally Responsive Positive Behavior Interventions and Supports (CRPBIS) is an ongoing statewide research project founded by Dr. Aydin Bal in 2011. The purpose of CRPBIS is to re-mediate school cultures that reproduce behavioral outcome disparities and marginalization of non-dominant students and families. CRPBIS project is conducted at the Wisconsin Center for Education Research at the School of Education, University of Wisconsin–Madison. CRPBIS develops, utilizes, and researches processes and interventions such as Learning Lab to create locally meaningful and sustainable systemic transformations together with local stakeholders (educators, families, students, community representatives). Learning Lab is an innovative methodology of systemic transformation, informed by Cultural-Historical Activity Theory (CHAT) (Bal, 2015; Engestrom, 2008).

As a part of CRPBIS project, local schools create their own decision-making teams with members of their communities to identify and understand systemic problems (e.g., racial disproportionality in school disciplinary actions) within their own schools, propose new solutions, and examine the effectiveness of their solutions.
