= Avrohom Elyashiv =

Belarusian Orthodox rabbi, Av Beis Din of Gomel

Rabbi Avrohom Elyashiv

Personal life
- Born: Avrohom Levinson אברהם אלישיב; 1876 or 1877
- Died: October 15, 1942 (aged 65)
- Buried: Mount of Olives Jewish Cemetery
- Spouse: Chaya Musha Elyashiv (m. 1893)
- Children: Yosef Shalom Elyashiv
- Education: Radin Yeshiva

Religious life
- Religion: Judaism

Avrohom Elyashiv (Hebrew: אברהם אלישיב; c. 1877–1942) was the Av Beis Din (head of a rabbinical court) of the city of Gomel (Homel)

== Biography ==
Avrohom Levinson (later Elyashiv) was the son-in-law of the kabbalist, Shlomo Elyashiv, author of the Leshem Shevo V’Achlamah. He was also the father of Yosef Shalom Eliashiv. He studied under Rabbi Yisrael Meir Kagan, known as the Chofetz Chaim, in Raduń Yeshiva and later in Dvinsk.

In 1924, he immigrated to Jerusalem along with his father-in-law, his wife Chaya Musha, and young son Yosef Shalom. Following advice from Kagan, he changed his family name from Levinson to that of his father-in-law so the family would have a uniform immigration certificate.

== Rabbinic career ==
In Jerusalem, Elyashiv was granted semicha by Rabbi Avraham Isaac Kook.

Elyashiv founded and headed the yeshiva Tiferes Bochurim for working students, which was later headed by his son.

Elyashiv was the author of Bikkurei Avrohom.
