= Learning Lab =

Research methodology

Learning Lab (LL) is a research methodology developed in 2011 by Aydin Bal that provides guidelines to develop family-school-community partnerships and design behavioral support systems within a local school community.

The Learning Lab methodology was adapted from the change laboratory methodology and is grounded in Cultural Historical Activity Theory. The moral purpose of the Learning Lab is participatory social justice. The goal of the Learning Lab methodology is to facilitate collective agency among local stakeholders who develop systemic solutions to educational equity issues such as racial disproportionality in exclusionary and punitive school disciplinary actions (e.g., detention, suspension, and expulsion).

In the Culturally Responsive Positive Behavioral Intervention and Supports Project, the Learning Lab has been implemented at urban pre K-12 schools in the United States.
