= Independent Book Publishers Association =

US publishing trade association

The Independent Book Publishers Association (IBPA) is a not-for-profit membership organization serving the independent publishing community through advocacy, education and tools for success. With over 3,500 members, IBPA is the largest publishing trade association in the United States.

== History ==
IBPA was founded in 1983 as the Publishers Association of Southern California (PASCAL). It later became the Publishers Marketing Association (PMA). It adopted its present name in 2008. In 2025, PubWest and IBPA combined entities, with members of PubWest joining IBPA as members.

== IBPA Members ==
IBPA's membership comprises all Independent Publishers whom it defines as:

- Traditional independent presses (who do not consider themselves as among the Big 5 or large corporate publishers)
- Hybrid presses
- University presses, nonprofit and association presses
- Author-publishers

Members also include publishing service providers, printers, distributors, students, and authors. Membership starts at $155 a year for publishers.

== Mission ==
IBPA's MISSION is to lead and serve the independent publishing community through advocacy, education, and tools for success.

== Activities ==
IBPA is focused on achieving its mission through these key areas:

Advocacy -- In addition to advocating for all independent publishers within the industry and in legislative matters, IBPA supplies resources that elevate independent publishing, such as the IBPA Industry Standards Checklist, the IBPA Book Award program, the IBPA Hybrid Publishers Checklist, DEI Resource Center, and more.

Education -- Throughout the year, IBPA provides webinars, an annual indie publishers' conference called IBPA Publishing University, roundtables, podcasts, magazines, an online forum, and many other options for publishers to learn the latest best practices in publishing.

Tools for Success -- IBPA runs multiple marketing programs to enable independent publishers access to key markets such as bookstore buyers, librarians, reviewers, international rights agents and the media. In addition, it negotiates valuable discounts and access for its members on services that publishers use, such as printing, shipping, warehousing, design and editorial services, and more.

== IBPA Book Award (formerly the IBPA Benjamin Franklin Award) ==
Established in 1985, the IBPA Book Award (formerly the IBPA Benjamin Franklin Award) honors independent publishers and self-published authors for excellence in book editorial and design. It is the most established and recognized book award dedicated to the craft of independent publishing. Prizes are given in a number of categories including Bill Fisher Award for Best First Book. Over 190 judges including IBPA members, as well as librarians, reviewers, editors and bookstore owners choose the winners and provide feedback to the authors about their books.

== IBPA Publishing University ==
IBPA's Publishing University is a two-day networking and educational event designed for all independent publishers to gather annually. The program includes learning labs, free Ask-the-Experts consultations, exhibitor hall, and a book-award ceremony.

== IBPA Industry Standards Checklist for a Professionally Published Book ==
Since 2017, IBPA has published an Industry Standards Checklist for a Professionally Published Book. The purpose of the checklist is to give independent publishers an at-a-glance gauge of the professional presentation of any book in order to help level the playing field between indie publishers and large-scale conglomerates.

== IBPA Hybrid Publishing Criteria ==
In 2018, IBPA has published the industry reference guide, the IBPA Hybrid Publisher Criteria, a list of 11 criteria defining what is a professional hybrid publisher. Authors are encouraged to learn about the differences between hybrid publishers vs. publishing services providers.

== IBPA Publishing MAP (Models and Author Pathways) ==
In this free guide, Publishing Models and Author Pathways, IBPA provides an overview on the 8 types of publishing business models i.e. types of publishers, and a guide for authors looking at different pathways to getting their creative works published.

== IBPA Book Marketing Programs ==
As part of IBPA's mission to provide indie publishers with access to markets, IBPA offers a number of cooperative marketing programs for its members including:

- Trade Shows -- Cooperative booths at American Library Association conference, Frankfurt Book Fair, Bologna Book Fair, Guadalajara Book Fair and regional trade shows
- Eblasts sent every quarter to librarians in public libraries, universities and schools.
- Trade Magazine Advertising in Foreword Reviews, and Library Journal
- Dedicated book promotion emails sent to the Media (print, TV, radio) on behalf of members
