= Museum docent =

Title for people who serve as guides and educators

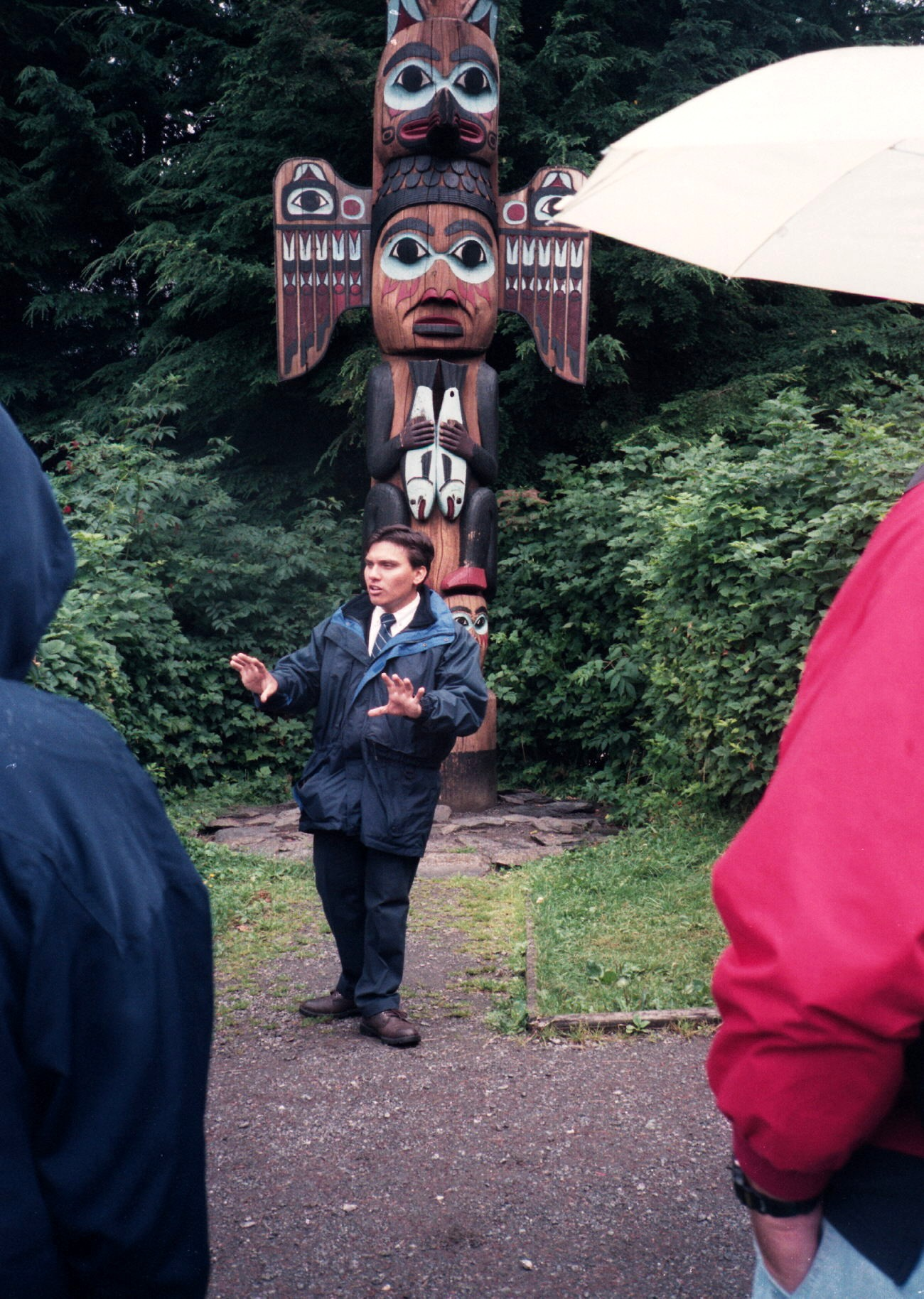
Totem pole lecture

Museum docent is a title given in the United States of America to people who serve as guides and educators for the institutions they serve, usually as a volunteer (unpaid) position. The English word itself is derived from the Latin word docēns, the present active participle of docēre (to teach, to lecture). Cognates of this word are found in several extant Romance Languages (and languages influenced by Romance languages) and are often associated with university professors or teachers in general. For example, in Spanish language, the word "docente" (from the same Latin root) means "teacher".

In many cases, docents also conduct research utilizing the institution's facilities. The title "docent" is not widely used outside the United States in English languages, with the terms "guide", "facilitator", or "educator" preferred.

== United States ==
Museum docent is a title used in the United States for educators trained to further the public's understanding of the cultural and historical collections of the institution, including local and national museums, planetariums, zoos, historical landmarks, and parks.

Prospective docents generally undergo an intense training process at the expense of the educational institution, which teaches them good communicative and interpretive skills, as well as introducing them to the institution's collection and its historical significance. They are also provided with reading lists to add to the basic information provided during training, and must then "shadow" experienced docents as they give their tours before ultimately conducting tours on their own.

== See also ==
- Docent, the title conferred by some European universities to denote a specific academic appointment within a set structure of academic ranks.
- Museum education
