= Shlomo Elyashiv =

Rabbi Shlomo Elyashiv (Eliashov) שלמה בן חיים חייקל אלישיב
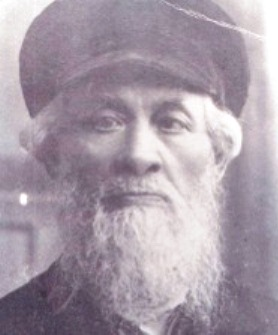
- Rabbi Shlomo Elyashiv, Ba'al HaLeshem
- Title: kabbalist

Personal life
- Born: January 5, 1841 Šiauliai, Lithuania
- Died: March 13, 1926 (aged 84) Jerusalem
- Buried: Mount of Olives Jewish Cemetery, Jerusalem

Religious life
- Religion: Judaism
- Denomination: Orthodox

Shlomo Elyashiv (Eliashov) (January 5, 1841 [12 Tevet 5602] - March 13, 1926 [27 Adar, 5676]) (Hebrew: שלמה בן חיים חייקל אלישיב), also known as the Leshem or Ba'al HaLeshem, was a famous kabbalist, who was born in Šiauliai, Lithuania, and later moved to the Land of Israel.

== Biography ==
His father was Rabbi Chayim Chaikl Eliashoff.

Rabbi Elyashev, a talmudist, studied in the yeshivot of Minsk and Telz. In addition to his own works on Kabbalah (Leshem), he was instrumental in printing works of earlier kabbalists.

== Aliyah ==
Eliashiv taught Rabbi Abraham Isaac Kook Kabbalah when Rabbi Kook was the young rabbi of the town of Zoimel. Rabbi Kook was granted a month-long leave of absence to study with the famous kabbalist in Shavel.

In 1922, when Rabbi Kook was serving as chief rabbi of Jerusalem, Rabbi Elyashiv asked him for assistance in settling in Eretz Yisrael. Due to Rav Kook's intervention, the great kabbalist, his son-in-law, daughter, and his eleven-year-old grandson (who would grow up to be the great scholar Rabbi Yosef Shalom Elyashiv), were allowed to emigrate to the Land of Israel.

"One particularly poignant story tells of a visit the revered Leshem paid to the chief rabbi. It was a bitterly cold winter evening and Rav Kook noted that the Leshem had no coat. Rav Kook immediately took his own fur-lined coat from his closet and gave it to the elderly man as a gift. This coat remained in the Elyashiv family as an heirloom and was periodically worn by Rabbi Yosef Shalom Elyashiv on wintry days."

Rabbi Elyashiv died in 1926, and is buried in Mount of Olives Jewish Cemetery in Jerusalem.

== Works ==
The primary work for which Elyashiv is known is Leshem Shevo V’Achlama, which was written in four parts and released in the following order:

- Drushei Olam HaTohu (Sefer HaDei'ah) - Elyashiv details what happened, based upon the Zohar, Arizal, and the Vilna Gaon, from the first moment of God's emanation of light that we are allowed to study, until physical Creation itself.
- Hakdamot u’She’arim (HaKadosh) - An introduction to Elyashiv's system, based upon the idea of five major revelations that occur between the Divine and humanity; it also contains a discussion of the Sarugian Lurianic system, particularly of the idea of the "malbush"
- Sha’arei Leshem Shevo V’Achlama, Sefer HaBeiurim
- Sha’arei Leshem Shevo V’Achlama, Sefer HaKlallim
