= Yosef Shalom Elyashiv =

Israeli Haredi rabbi (1910–2012)

Rabbi Yosef Shalom Elyashiv יוסף שלום אלישיב
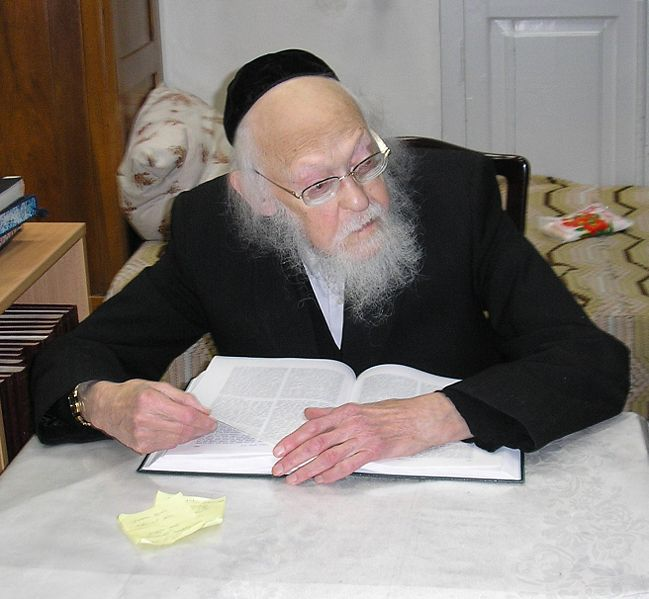
- Elyashiv at home

Personal life
- Born: 10 April 1910; Nisan 1, 5670 AM (Hebrew calendar) Šiauliai, Russian Empire (later Lithuania)
- Died: 18 July 2012 (aged 102); Tamuz 28, 5772 AM (Hebrew calendar) Jerusalem
- Children: 12, including Batsheva Kanievsky
- Parent(s): Avraham Elyashiv; Chaya Moussa Elyashiv

Religious life
- Religion: Judaism
- Denomination: Orthodox Judaism

Jewish leader
- Position: Posek
- Organization: Degel HaTorah

Yosef Shalom Elyashiv (Hebrew: יוסף שלום אלישיב; 10 April 1910 – 18 July 2012) was a Haredi (ultra-Orthodox) Jewish rabbi and posek (arbiter of Jewish law) who lived in Jerusalem. Until his death at the age of 102, Rav Elyashiv was the paramount leader of both Israel and the Diaspora Lithuanian-Haredi community, and many Ashkenazi Jews regarded him as the posek ha-dor, the contemporary leading authority on halakha, or Jewish law.

He spent most of his days engaged in Talmudical study, and delivered lectures in Talmud and Shulkhan Arukh at a local synagogue in the Meah Shearim area in Jerusalem where he lived. He received supplicants from all over the world, and answered the most complex Halakhic inquiries.

== Biography ==
Elyashiv was the son of Avraham Elyashiv of Gomel, Belarus, and Chaya Mushka, daughter of Shlomo Elyashiv.

Born in 1910 at Šiauliai, he moved with his parents to Mandatory Palestine in 1922, aged 12. He was an only child, born to his parents after 17 years of marriage.

At the suggestion of the Chief Rabbi of Palestine, Abraham Isaac Kook, Elyashiv married Sheina Chaya (died 19 June 1994), a daughter of Aryeh Levin. Kook also conducted the wedding.

The couple had five sons and seven daughters. When he died he had approximately 1,400 descendants, including two sixth-generation descendants.

== Death ==
In February 2012 he was admitted to the cardiac intensive care unit of the Jesselson Heart Center due to an acute condition of edema of the lungs and congestion in the heart. He died on 18 July 2012, aged 102, and was buried on Har HaMenuchot after a late-night funeral procession attended by an estimated 250,000 people.

== Leadership ==
Elyashiv began his rabbinic career as a judge in the government's religious court system, and was a protégé of Yitzhak HaLevi Herzog, Israel's Ashkenazi Chief Rabbi. In the early 1970s, he left the state court system.

In 1989 he joined the newly-established religious political party Degel HaTorah at the invitation of its spiritual leader Elazar Shach.

Time referred to Elyashiv as the predecessor of Aharon Leib Shteinman as Gadol Hador ("leader of the generation").

== See also ==
- Nachum Eisenstein
