= Yitzchak Meir Morgenstern =

Israeli Hasidic rabbi and Kabbalist

Rabbi Yitzchak Meir Morgenstern
- יצחק מאיר מורגנשטרן
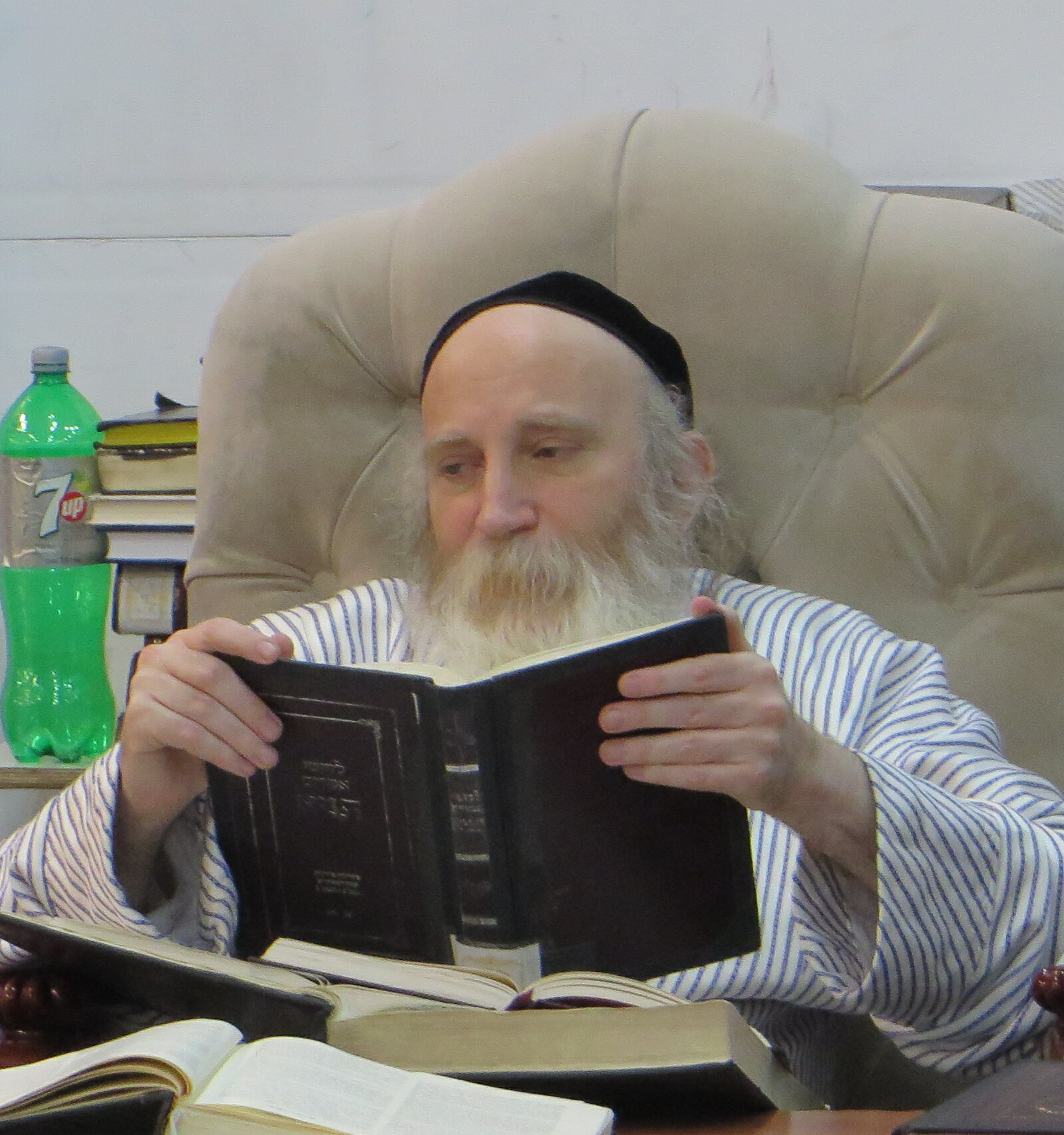
- Morgenstern in June 2021

Personal life
- Born: Yitzchak Meir Morgenstern; December 10, 1966 (age 59) Hendon, London, United Kingdom
- Spouse: Daughter of Rabbi Yosef Lubinsky
- Children: Yisrael, Yaakov Menachem
- Parent(s): Yaakov Menachem and Yocheved-Sima Morgenstern
- Notable work: Yam HaChochma
- Education: Lucerne Yeshiva; Gateshead Yeshiva
- Known for: Kabbalistic teachings, combining Chabad, Breslov, and Kamarna with Lurianic and Sarugian Kabbalah
- Occupation: Rabbi, Kabbalist, Rosh Yeshiva

Religious life
- Religion: Judaism
- Denomination: Hasidic Judaism

Jewish leader
- Yeshiva: Yeshivat Torat Chochom
- Residence: Jerusalem, Israel

Yitzchak "Itche" Meir Morgenstern (Hebrew: יצחק מאיר מורגנשטרן; born December 10, 1966) is an Israeli Hasidic rabbi and Kabbalist.

== Biography ==
Morgenstern was born to Yaakov Menachem and Yocheved Sima Morgenstern, Ger Hasidim, in the Hendon neighborhood of London. As a child he studied at the Lucerne and Gateshead yeshivas while immersing himself in the study of Kabbalah and Hasidism. He married the daughter of Rabbi Yosef Lubinsky of Antwerp (known as the Rebbe of Chentshin) and lived in Antwerp and Jerusalem after his marriage. Among his teachers are Rabbi Nissan Dovid Kivak, Rabbi Tzvi Hirsch Rosenbaum, the Rebbe of Kretshnif-Sighet, and Rabbi Yaakov Leizer, the Rebbe of Pshevorsk. He also studied Kabbalah under Rabbi Yitzchak Kaduri and Rabbi David Batzri, and with Rabbi Eliezer Tzvi Safrin of Komarno, currently the Rebbe of Komarno in Beit Shemesh.

The community of students and followers surrounding Morgenstern has grown organically since the nineties. Around 1995, he began holding seudah shlishit at the Satmar beit midrash in the Ezrat Torah neighborhood, attended by Breslov Hasidim. In 1997, he opened a small kollel in the Mekor Baruch neighborhood, called Elima. In 2002, he opened the beit midrash "Toras Chochom" on Ohalei Yosef Street in the Givat Moshe neighborhood, named after the book of the same name by Chaim de la Roza. The beit midrash includes a midnight kollel, a morning kollel for studies in halakha, and an afternoon kollel for studies in Kabbalah. Over the years, a Hasidic community has formed around him. He receives kvitlach and is referred to as a Rebbe, though he personally emphasizes that he is a Breslov Hasid. Among his followers are singers Mordechai Ben David and Beri Weber.

Morgenstern is known for his extended synthesis of teachings and systems from the Baal Shem Tov—particularly as expressed in the writings of Chabad, Komarno, and Nachman of Breslov—with the Kabbalah of the Arizal and his successors, most notably Rabbi Shalom Sharabi and his student Chaim de la Roza. He also draws very much from Sarugian Kabbalah, developed by Rabbi Israel Sarug. He delivers daily classes on the Zohar, Likutei Moharan, Chayei Moharan, daf yomi, and Kabbalah. He also teaches classes in Hasidic thought. Additionally, during seudah shlishit on Shabbat, he holds a tish where he delivers Torah teachings on the weekly Torah portion and other relevant topics. His teachings from seudah shlishit are printed in a weekly booklet called De'eh Chochma LeNafshecha. On Friday night, he does not hold a tish but delivers Torah teachings at his home before his followers during the Shabbat meal. These teachings, along with other classes given during the week, have historically been printed in a booklet called Nishmatin Chadetin, distributed weekly via email and in limited print.

For years, he traveled to Uman for Rosh Hashanah, as is the custom among Breslov Hasidim, with hundreds of followers from Israel, England, and the United States, joining his minyan there. In 2012, prior to the holiday, Morgenstern traveled to Uman but decided to return to Israel before the holiday began. He published a pamphlet stating that those connected to a tzaddik in Israel could stay in Israel for Rosh Hashanah. He also wrote an essay on this topic for his group called VeHaEmet VeHaShalom Ehavu. Some of the prayers that year were held at the Tomb of David, which he has shown interest in in recent years. However, for Rosh Hashanah 2013, he was again in Uman. In subsequent years, he remained in Jerusalem, sometimes traveling to Uman on the eve of Rosh Hashanah and returning to Israel for the holiday. For several years since, there has been a dedicated practice and theology developed around Uman beYerushalayim, celebrating Rosh Hashanah at "Uman in Jerusalem", and the connection between the souls of Nachman of Breslov and King David.

His books have received endorsements from Rabbi Moshe Halberstam, Rabbi Yechiel Fishel Eisenbach, Rabbi Dov Weiss, and others.

== Family ==
His eldest son, Yisrael, married the daughter of Rabbi Pinchas Moshe Taub, the Rebbe of Kozmir, in 2014. His second son Yaakov Menachem married the daughter of the Rebbe of Ashlag in 2023.

== Teachings ==
=== Kabbalah ===
Morgenstern bases his Kabbalistic approach on the teachings of Rabbi Chaim de la Roza. This approach often interprets things non-literally and frequently utilizes Rabbi Shalom Sharabi's principle of erechin (values), which posits that the values of various metaphysical concepts are relative and contextual. This reconciles contradictions between sources, which, according to this approach, should be treated as relative. Accordingly, Morgenstern teaches that all disputes in Judaism are only dissonant from an apparent external perspective, and do not represent the actual unity of inner truth. His teachings regularly incorporate and syncretize elements from the Sephardic Kabbalistic tradition; Hasidic thought, particularly Chabad, Breslov, Komarna, Zidichov, and Aharon of Staroshelye; the Lithuanian Kabbalah of the Vilna Gaon and his students; and the modernist system of Yehuda Ashlag. A prominent example of the result of this method comes in the form of his claim that there is no actual dispute on the concept of tzimtzum (Divine self-contraction) between proponents of Hasidism and their famous critic the Vilna Gaon, and that both approaches fundamentally agree with the Hasidic approach. In the wake of this method, he believes that the exoteric peshat level of Rabbinic exegesis aligns with the esoteric sod of Kabbalistic interpretation. Morgenstern often endeavors to explain the reasons for halakhic disputes based on the soul roots of the opinion holders.

Morgenstern has also developed meditation methods based on Kabbalistic sources, summarized mainly in the Derech Hayichud section of the Yam Hachochma collection.

Morgenstern opposes the critical approach of Yosef Avivi and Rabbi Yaakov Moshe Hillel, who believe that parts of the writings of Isaac Luria are innovations of Chaim Vital himself and not what he received from his teacher. Morgenstern is a proponent of the view that everything written in the Lurianic writings is a direct teaching from Luria unless explicitly stated otherwise.

He stands out among the Kabbalists following the path of Rabbi Shalom Sharabi by instructing his students to pray with that school's Kabbalistic intentions even during thecounting of the Omer and the time between Rosh Hashanah and Shemini Atzeret. This is unlike the custom of Beit El and most of Sharabi's students, and relies on the opinion of de la Rosa.

=== Halakha ===
Although Morgenstern does not formally rule on halakha and usually refers questioners to recognized authorities, he engages in halakhic inquiries published in the Yam Hachochma and Nishmatin Chadetin collections.

Morgenstern tends to pray at very late hours, relying on unique opinions regarding the times of day for prayer following the approach of the Maharshal. Regarding twilight, he follows the opinion of Rabbeinu Tam and believes this was also the view of Isaac Luria.

He heavily relies on esoteric Kabbalistic sources in his rulings, believing that their usage in practical jurisprudence does not contradict the Rabbinic principle that "the Torah is not in heaven."

Morgenstern wrote a responsum on renewing the mitzvah of techelet, rejecting the status of the commonly used techelet found today which is dyed using blood from the Murex trunculus snail. Arguing that this snail does not fit the signs given by the sages, Morgenstern prefers the Janthina snail for use in techelet, as proposed by Rabbi Yitzhak HaLevi Herzog. He currently wears the commonly used murex techelet however, since his preferred type is not available. In general, Morgenstern understands the fulfilling the commandment of techelet to be a pious additional act today, and not a binding element of tzitzit as argued by Rabbi Herschel Shachter and others.

He prohibits the One Brain method (a type of applied kinesiology where questions are asked, and answers are received through muscle testing), considering it a form of sorcery. The Rebbe of Amshinov, who permits the method, remarked that of all those who disagree, Morgenstern is the only one who represents the opposing viewpoint with erudition. Morgenstern has tried to influence rabbis such as Rabbi Ovadia Yosef and Rabbi Yosef Shalom Elyashiv to issue a prohibitive ruling on this matter.

Before Passover 2019, he expressed support for offering the Passover sacrifice and asked his students to register for a lamb to conduct the sacrifice.
