= Givat Moshe =

Haredi Jewish neighborhood in Jerusalem

Coordinates: 31.8°N 35.22°E

Givat Moshe (Hebrew: גבעת משה), also known as Gush Shemonim, is a Haredi Jewish neighborhood in Jerusalem bordering on Sanhedria, Mahanayim, Ezrat Torah, Shikun Chabad, and Tel Arza.

== History ==
Givat Moshe is home to numerous yeshivas and Hasidic synagogues. It is named after Rabbi Moshe Porush, a Haredi politician from Agudat Yisrael.

=== Yeshivas ===
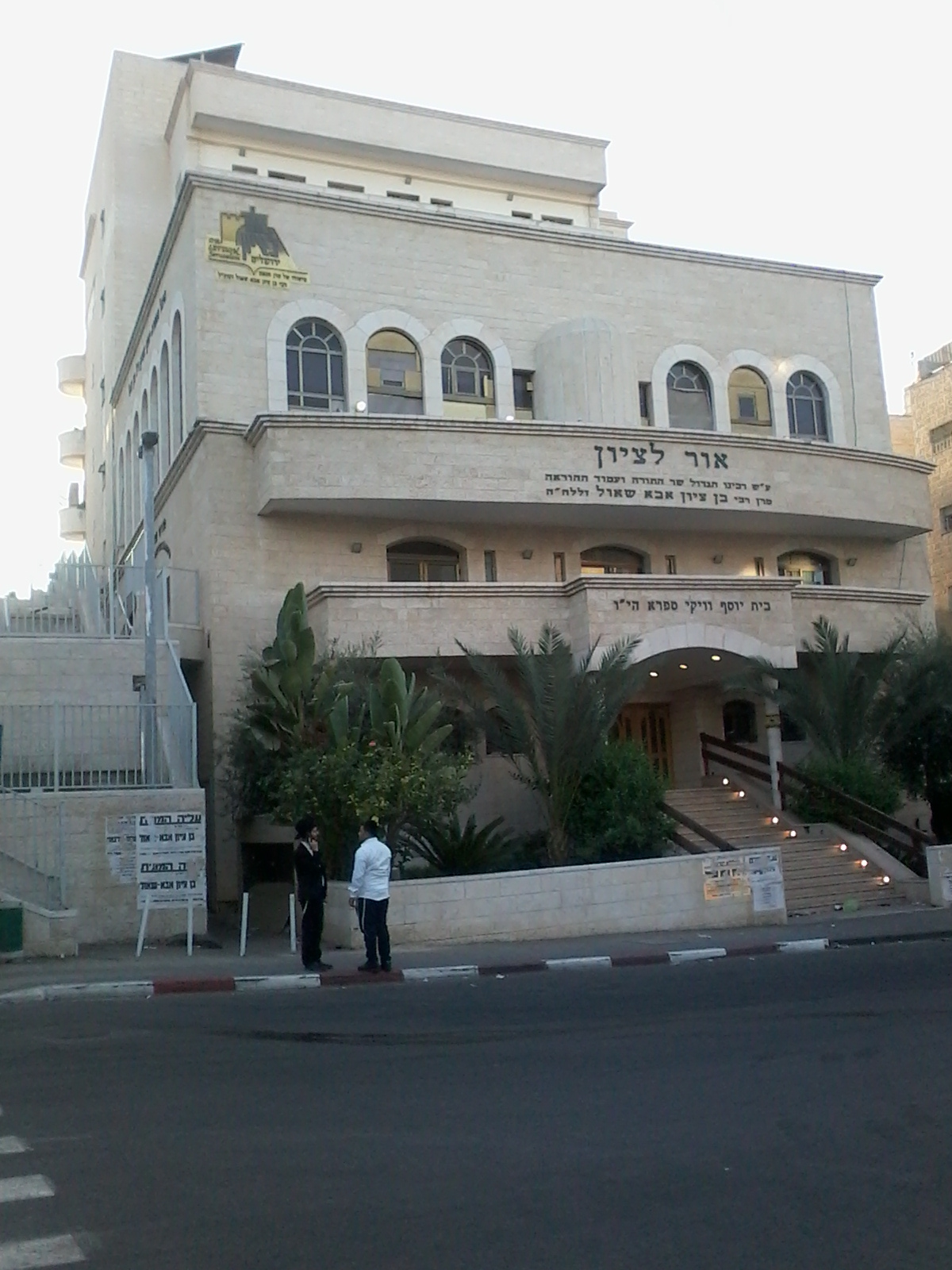
Yeshivat Or LeZion

- Yeshivas Yagdil Torah
- Yeshivas Givat Shaul
- Brisk Yeshiva of Rabbi Meshulam Dovid Soloveitchik (Reb Velvel)
- Yeshivas Meor Einayim of Rachmastrivka
- Yeshivat Kaf HaChaim for Baalei Teshuvah
- Yeshivat Or LeZion
- Yeshiva Torah VeEmunah, Baal Teshuvah yeshiva established by Belz
- Yeshivas Avnei Nezer of Sochatchov
- Yeshivat Tiferet Yaakov
- Yeshivas Tiferes HaTalmud
- Yeshivas HaRema of Rabbi Chaim Uri Freund, member of Badatz Edah HaChareidis

=== Synagogues ===
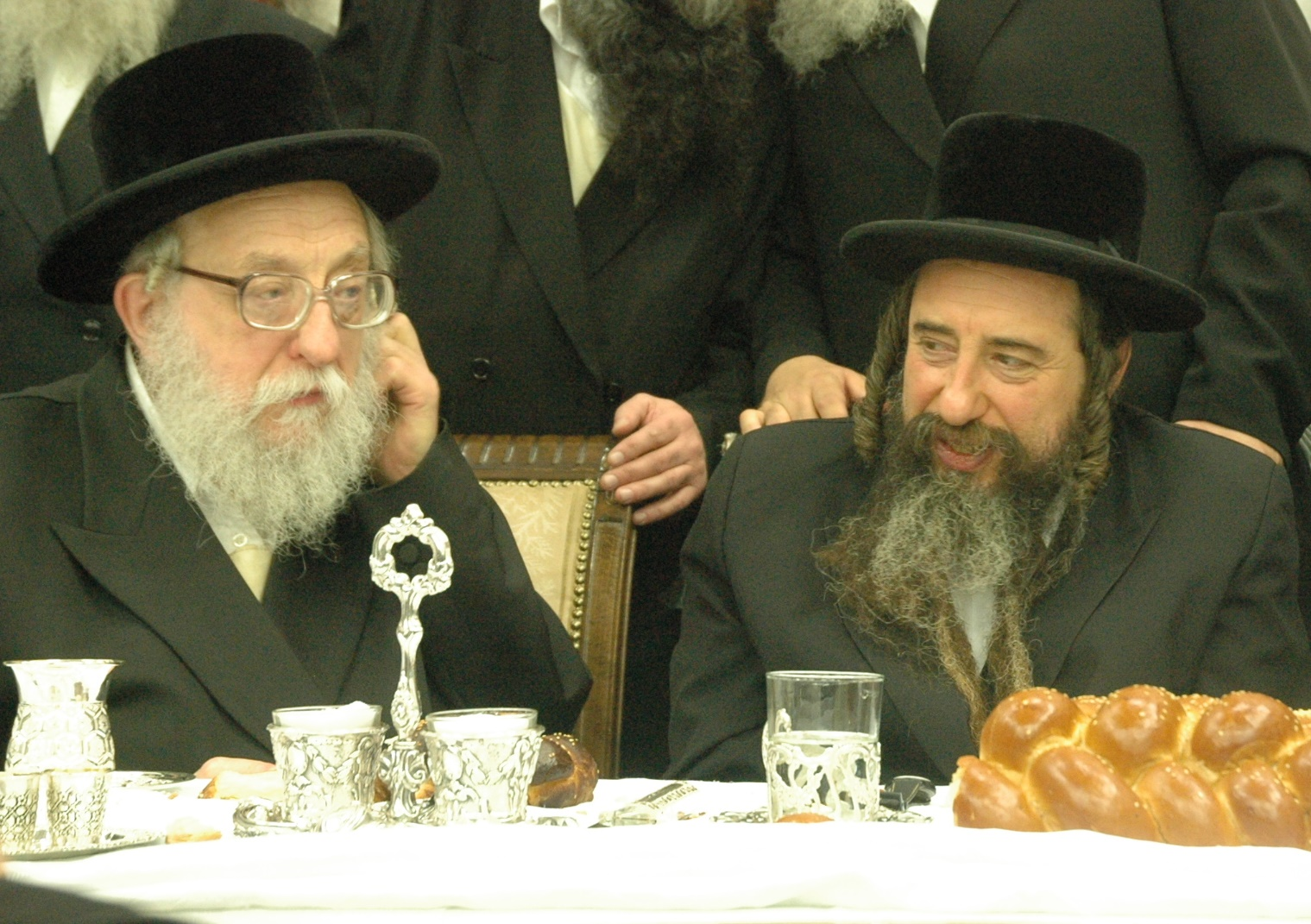
Rachmastrivka Rebbe Rabbi David Twersky (right) the inauguration of the Rachmastrivka beth midrash

- Rachmastrivka Beth Midrash
- Shidlovtza (Hasidic community)
- Toras Chacham of Rabbi Yitzchak Meir Morgenstern
- Synagogue of Rabbi Yitzchak Tuvia Weiss of the Edah HaChareidis
- Seret-Vizhnitz synagogue
- Bet HaKnesset Shevet HaLevi
- Ohel Moshe of Rabbi Don Segal
- Or Avraham (Breslov)
- Ma'ayanei Yisrael (Chabad)
- Amshinov synagogue
- Beit HaLevi (Yemenite)
- Yad Yechiel Yonah (Yemenite)
- Stuchin
- Ostrov Kalashin
