= Sholom Mordechai Schwadron =

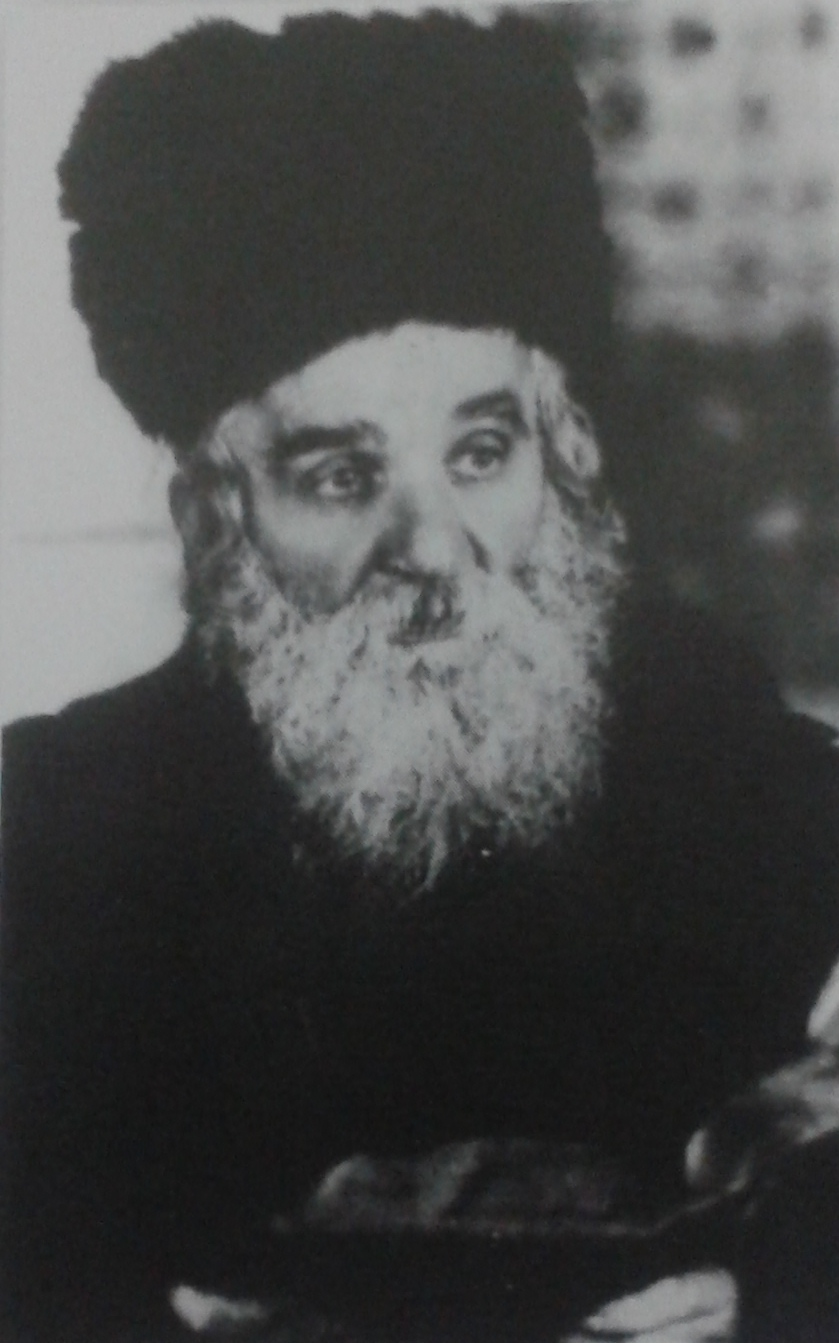

Sholom Mordechai Schwadron (1835 – 1911) (Hebrew: שלום מרדכי בן משה הכהן שוודרן), known by his acronym Maharsham, was a rabbi and foremost halachic authority. His main works "Shailos Uteshuvos Maharsham" and "Daas Torah" are widely studied sources of practical Jewish law. Among his prominent works are Mishpat Shalom on Choshen Mishpat. He was well known as a very lenient rabbi. He also authored Techeiles Mordechai, a three-volume commentary of the Torah.

== Biography ==
He was born in 1835 in Złoczów to Moshe Schwadron, a Torah scholar, and studied under Rabbi Yoel Ashkenazy. After his marriage he was bequeathed a wood business and was hesitant to become a rabbi. However, he did so at the age of 31.

It is known that after each din Torah (case in a rabbinical court), he would explain to the loser the reason he lost until he understood clearly. If the person was unable to understand, he would tell him: "You must have a good friend or family member that is a Torah scholar. Send him to me and I will explain it to him so you will feel that you were done justice."

He lived in Berezhany, where he acquired the nickname Gaon of Berezhany. He died there on the 16th of Shevat in 1911. His grandson, Rabbi Sholom Schwadron, was known as the "Maggid of Jerusalem".

His son, Isaac, was the rabbi of Khotymyr and wrote a commentary on the Tosefta called מנחת יצחק (Minhat Yitzhak). His daughter, Chana Sura, married Rabbi Sholom Shapiro, the Rabbi and Av Beit Din of Lanchyn, Galicia (now Ukraine). Their son, Grand Rebbe Pinchos Shapiro, was the Grand Rebbe of Kechnie, and father-in-law of the previous Kaliver Rebbe, Grand Rabbi Menachem Mendel Taub. He had another son rebbe Tzvi Hearsh but not many details are known about him.
