= Yitzhak Mizrahi Sharabi =

Orthodox rabbi and Kabbalist

Rabbi Yitzhak Mizrachi Sharabi (Hebrew: חזקיהו יצחק מזרחי שרעבי, d.1803 in Jerusalem), also known as Hezekiahu Isaac Mizrahi Sharabi, was the second Rosh Yeshiva of Beit El yeshiva and son of the Rashash. He was also related to Rav Chakham Yehiel Sharabi.
