= Shikun Chabad =

Neighborhood in Jerusalem

Coordinates: 31.7931°N 35.2127°E

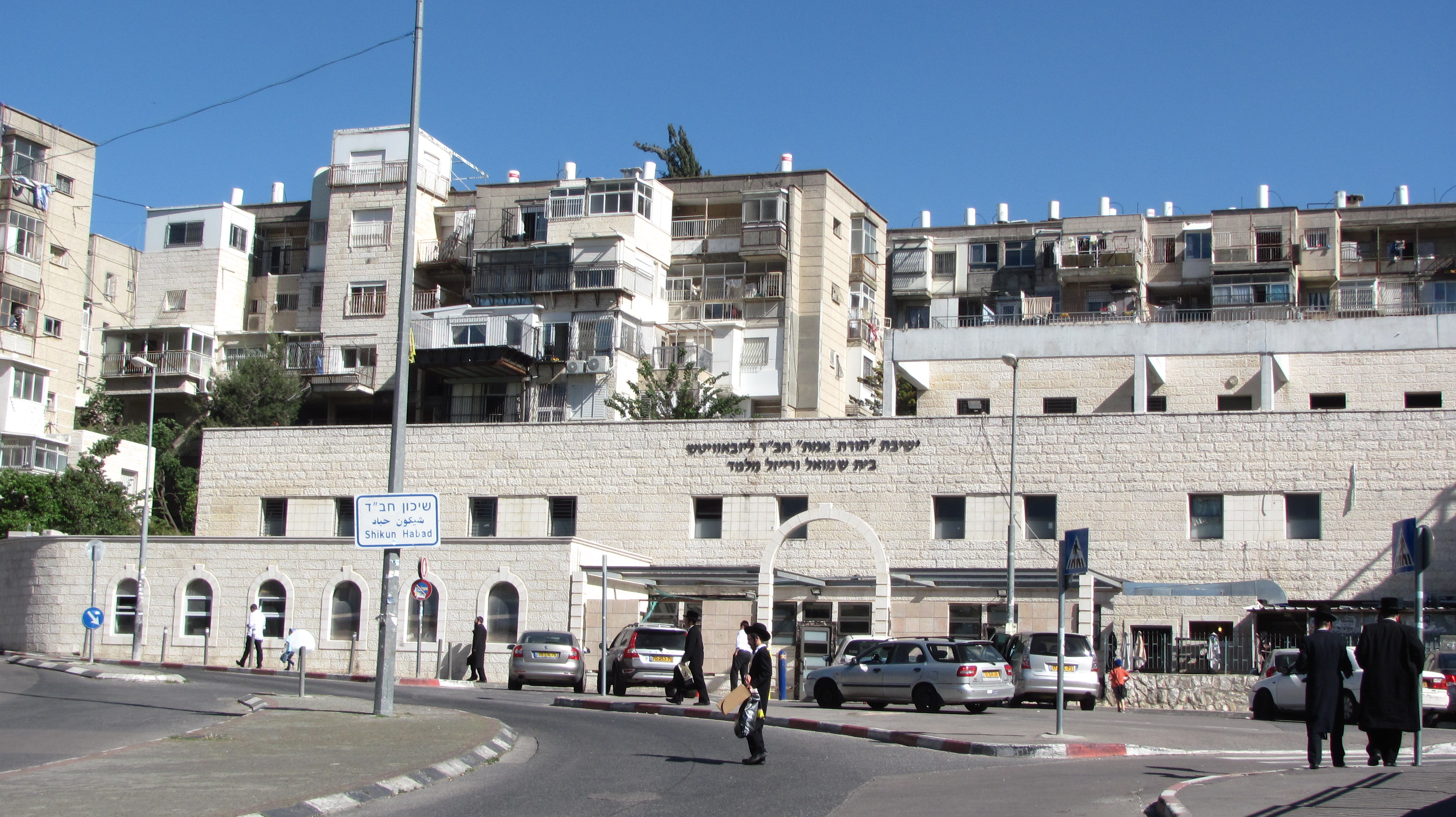
Yeshivas Toras Emes, surrounded by apartment buildings of Shikun Chabad

Shikun Chabad (Hebrew: שיכון חב"ד, literally, "Chabad Housing"), also spelled Shikun Habad, is a Hasidic Jewish neighborhood in northern Jerusalem. It includes the oldest Hasidic yeshiva in Israel and Jerusalem, Yeshivas Toras Emes.

== Location ==
Shikun Chabad is bordered by Ezrat Torah on the north, Romema on the west, Kerem Avraham on the south, and Tel Arza on the east. It lies adjacent to Route 417 (Yirmiyahu Street). Its main streets are Chana Street and Elkana Street.

== History ==
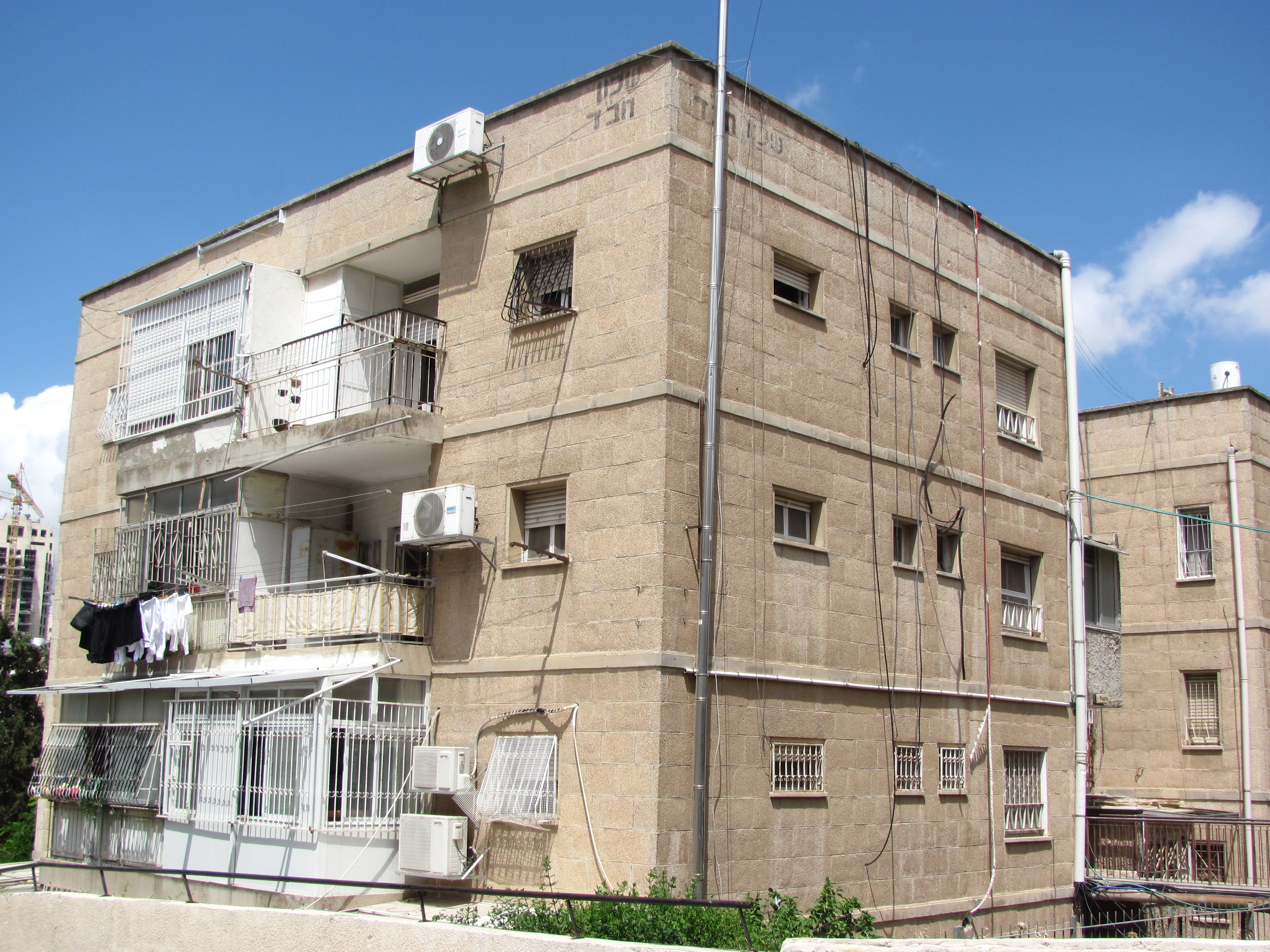
Original apartment buildings in Shikun Chabad

Shikun Chabad was founded in 1954 by the seventh Lubavitcher Rebbe, Rabbi Menachem Mendel Schneerson. It was ready for occupancy in 1961 with 116 apartment units, a Talmud Torah for 200 students, a girls' school for 180 students, and a kindergarten.

The neighborhood yeshiva, Yeshiva Toras Emes (Chabad), is the oldest Hasidic yeshiva in Israel. It was founded in Hebron in 1911 by the fifth Lubavitcher rebbe, Rabbi Sholom Dovber Schneersohn, and relocated to Jerusalem several years later. As of 2014, the Toras Emes Institutions include a rabbinical academy, kollel, yeshiva gedola, yeshiva ketana, Talmud Torah, and preschools.

Rabbi Tuvia Zilbershtrom is the Rav of Shikun Chabad.

In 2004 the Kaliver Rebbe, Rabbi Menachem Mendel Taub, moved his court from Bnei Brak to Jerusalem, opening a large beis medrash on Chana Street in Shikun Chabad.

== Demographics ==
A 2008 census showed that Shikun Chabad had one of the lowest workforce participation rates (29%) in the city. A 2011 survey by the Jerusalem Institute for Israel Studies reported that 51% of the residents of Shikun Chabad claimed exemption from payment of arnona (municipal taxes).

== Simchat Beit HaShoeivah ==
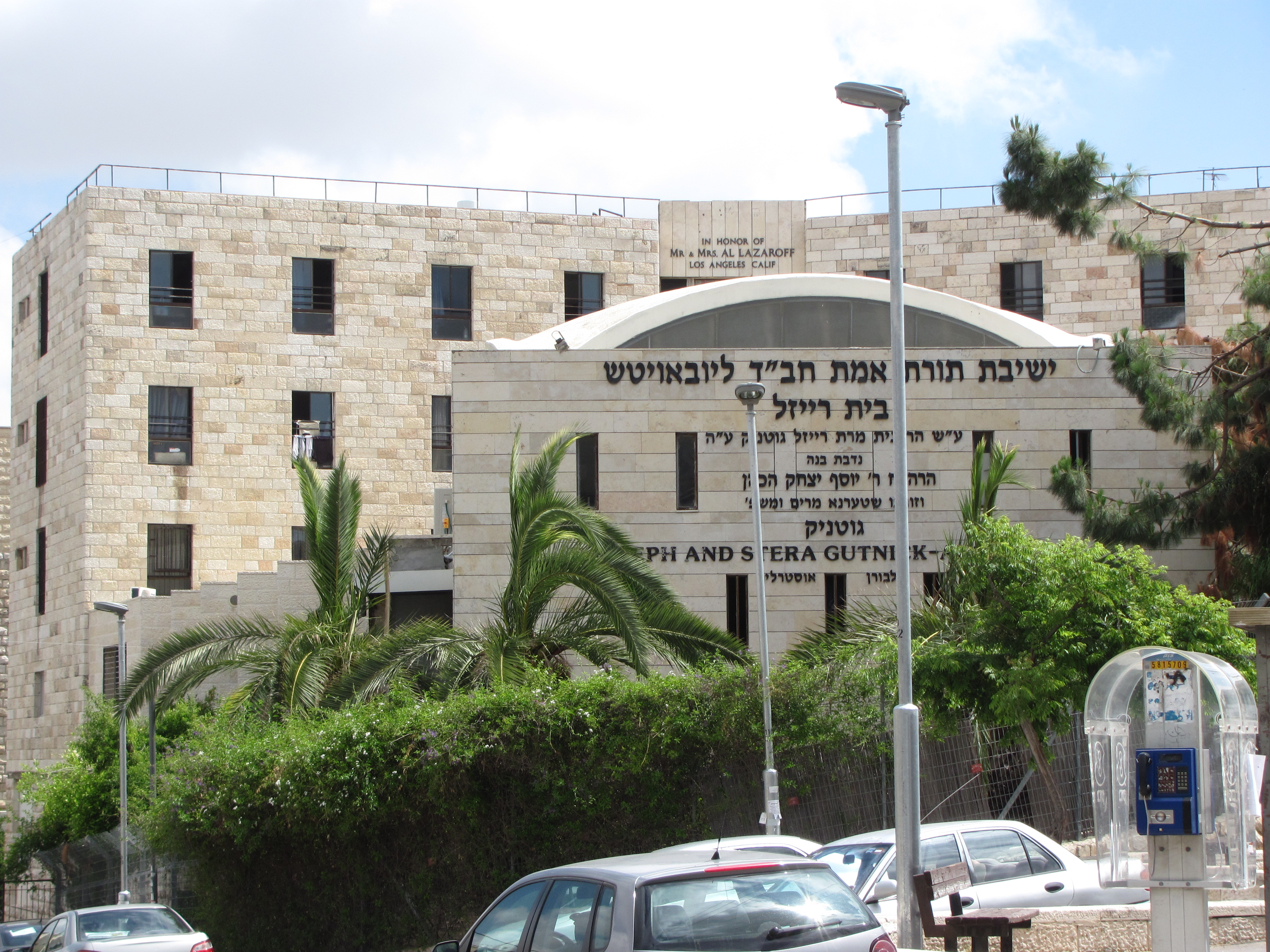
Yeshivas Toras Emes yeshiva gedola building

For many years, Shikun Chabad hosted public Simchat Beit HaShoeivah celebrations during the holiday of Sukkot, with outdoor music and dancing in its large square on Chana Street. In 2008, leaders of other Hasidic sects and Lithuanian rabbis called on Shikun Chabad to move this event indoors to ensure total separation of men and women. Chabad rabbis acquiesced to this demand, although it meant that women would be excluded since there was insufficient space for both sexes in its indoor facility. Chabad continues to sponsor outdoor concerts in other parts of the city, with men and women separated by partitions.

== Notable residents ==
- Rabbi Zalman Nechemia Goldberg
- Rabbi Menachem Mendel Taub, the Kaliver Rebbe
- Rabbi Ya'akov Yosef
- Rabbi Shalom Schechter, rosh yeshiva of Ner Moshe in Givat Shaul.

== Shikun Chabad, Lod ==
In summer 1965 the cornerstone was laid for a second Shikun Chabad in Lod, Israel.
