= Shalom Hedaya =

Son of Rabbi Moshe Hayyim Hedaya and Sabtiah Shamah

- שלום הדאיה
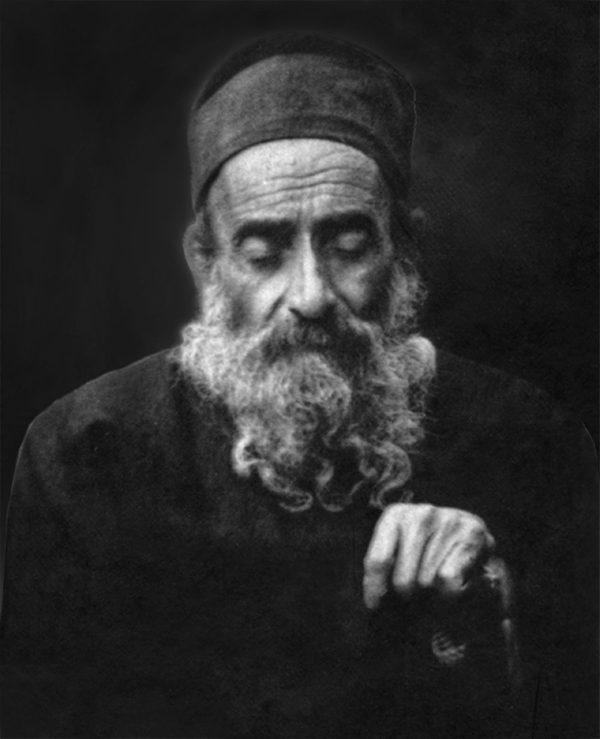
- Born: 1864
- Died: 1944 (aged 79–80); Jerusalem, Mandatory Palestine
- Occupations: Rabbi, judge
- Known for: Head of the Sephardic Beit Din in Jerusalem
- Spouse: Sarah Labaton
- Children: Ovadia Hedaya
- Parent: Moshe Hayyim Hedaya

Shalom Hedaya (Hebrew: שלום הדאיה; 1864 – 1944) was the son of Rabbi Moshe Hayyim Hedaya and Sabtiah Shamah. He was orphaned at an early age and was very poor. He was so poor he had no one to take care of him and he considered leaving the path of Torah in order to earn a living. He was fortunate enough to receive help from Ribbi Shelomo Safdeye, Ribbi Ovadiah Moshe Antebi, Ribbi Shmuel Silvera and Senor Aharon Silvera. He was taught by the great Kabbalist Ribbi Moshe Swed, the Av Beit Din Ribbi Yits`haq Bekhor Mizra`hi and later on Rabbi Shaul Sitton, who became Head of the Rabbinical Court in Buenos Aires.

Rabbi Hedaya visited Jerusalem in 1890. He developed an illness in his eyes and soon became blind. He traveled to Alexandria, Khedivate of Egypt for surgery and completely recovered. In 1899, he settled in Jerusalem, where he was widely respected. In 1904, he became Judge of the Beit Din for Sephardic Jews and in 1930 he became head of the court. After a time, he became very ill and had to travel to Amman, where he was treated and cured. When Rabbi Hedaya returned to Jerusalem, he became the Rabbi of Beit El Synagogue and was given the title Harav Hachasid.

He was married to Sarah Labaton, daughter of Rabbi Isaac Labaton. Their son Ovadia Hedaya became a leading Israeli rabbi.

== Published works ==
- Shalom Le-Am (Aleppo, 1896)
- Degel Ephraim, where he thanks God for the miracles and wonders done for him;
- Kisay Shlomo (Jerusalem, 1924); and
- Shalom VaTzedek, published in 1948 (the last two chapters were written by his son Rabbi Ovadia Hedaya).
