= Yedidyah Raphael Chai Abulafiya =

19th-century kabbalist, Rosh Yeshiva of Bet El Kabbalistic Yeshiva

Rabbi Yedidia Raphael Chai Abulafia
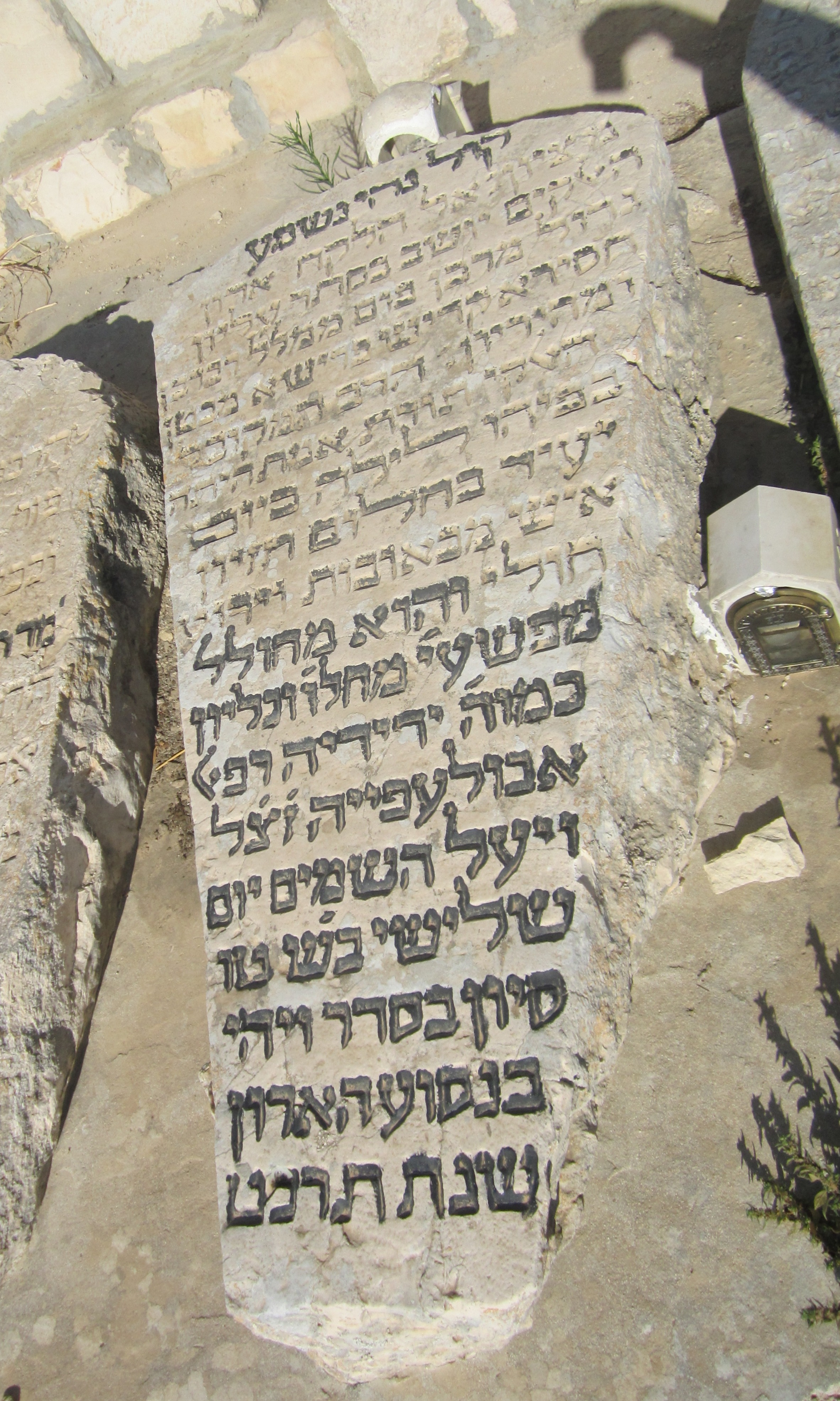
- Rabbi Yedidia Raphael Chai Abulafia

Head of Beit El Kabbalist Yeshiva
- In office 1848–1869
- Preceded by: Rabbi Chaim Abraham Gagin

Personal details
- Born: 1806/7 Jerusalem
- Died: May 1869
- Occupation: Kabbalist, Rosh Yeshiva
- Known for: Head of Beit El Kabbalist Yeshiva, Derekh VeShalom, Kinyan Piryot

Rabbi Yedidia Raphael Chai Abulafia (1806/7 – May 1869) was a renowned Kabbalist who served as the head of the Beit El Kabbalist yeshiva.

== Biography ==
He was born in Jerusalem to the Abulafia family and was a student of Rabbi Raphael Abraham Shalom Mizrahi Sharabi, head of the Beit El Kabbalist Yeshiva of Kabbalists and grandson of Rabbi Shalom Mizrachi Sharabi, who was also head of the yeshiva until his death in 1827. In 1848, after the death of Rabbi Chaim Abraham Gagin, Abulafia was appointed as head of the yeshiva.

Israel Dov Frumkin described Rabbi Abulafia as "a righteous man oppressed with suffering, earning his livelihood through hard work, a pious saint, sanctified from birth." Moshe David Gaon wrote that Abulafia was great both in hidden wisdom and revealed Torah, and that the learning methods of the Ashkenazim were not foreign to him. His works include the books "Derekh VeShalom" and "Kinyan Piryot" on the Kavanot of the Rashash (Shalom Sharabi). He was the primary editor of the siddur of the Rashash Nahar Shalom. In these important notes his name is signed in the initials "HaYare" and this is how he is often referred to by sages of Kabbalah.

He was a zealot for the preservation of religion, he opposed the establishment of secular schools in Jerusalem. When Dr. Ludwig August von Frankl came to the city to establish the Lämel School there, he was the only Sephardi rabbi who joined the Ashkenazi rabbis and signed the great ban against the school. However, his grandson Nissim Bakhar, who founded a number of Jewish schools in Turkey, founded the Alliance School in Jerusalem. And another grandson, Shlomo Aboulafia, was among the teachers of the schools in the Old Yishuv.

In the year 1824, he was hit in the leg by shrapnel from a cannonball as a result of the Egyptian bombardment of Jerusalem. The doctors were unable to remove the shrapnel from his leg, which caused him pain all his life and eventually led to his death. He was buried in the Mount of Olives Jewish Cemetery.
