= Ovadia Hedaya =

Israeli rabbi

Ovadia Hedaya עובדיה הדאיה
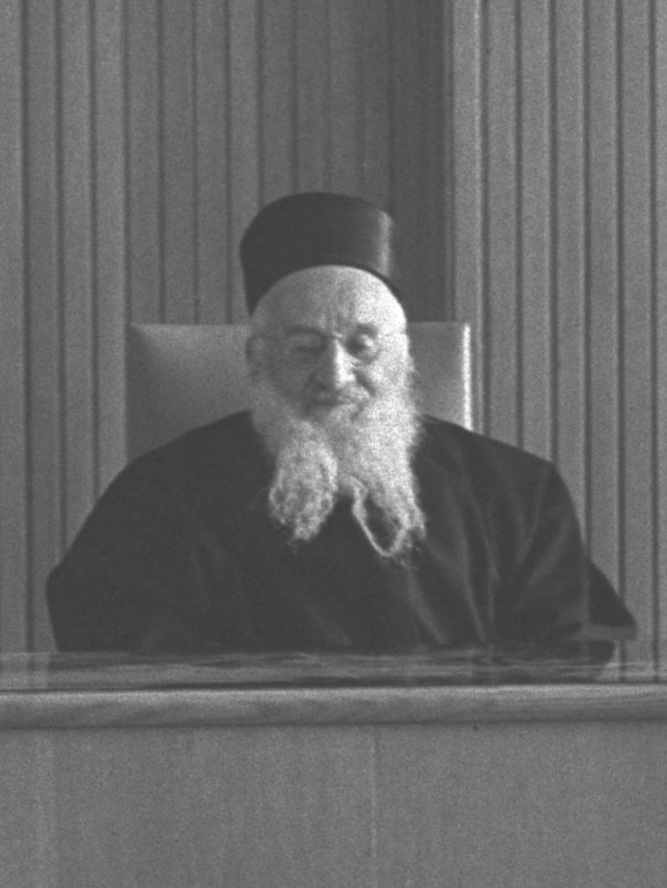
- Born: 24 December 1889; Aleppo, Syria
- Died: 8 February 1969 (aged 79)
- Citizenship: Israeli
- Writing career
- Language: Hebrew
- Notable awards: Israel Prize (1968)

Ovadia Hedaya (Hebrew: עובדיה הדאיה; 24 December 1889 – 8 February 1969) was a leading Israeli rabbi.

== Biography ==
Rabbi Hedaya was born in 1889 in Aleppo, Ottoman Syria, to rabbi Shalom Hedaya. In 1945, he succeeded his father as head of Yeshivat HaMekubalim, the center of kabbalistic study in Jerusalem.

== Awards and honours ==
- In 1968, Rabbi Hedaya was awarded the Israel Prize in Rabbinical literature.

== Published works ==
- Yaskil Avdi (ישכיל עבדי): (Eight volumes)
- Yaskil Avdi is a collection of Hedaya's responsa - ruling on questions of Jewish law - published in eight volumes. He also wrote commentaries on the Talmud and on Maimonides, as well as works on Kabbalah.

== See also ==
- List of Israel Prize recipients
