= Israel Sarug =

Jewish kabbalist, student of Isaac Luria (1590–1610)

Israel Sarug Ashkenazi (Hebrew: ר׳ ישראל סרוג אשכנזי, also סרוק Saruk or Srugo, known also as רי״ס the Ris and מהר״י סרוג Mahari Sarug, (fl. 1590–1610) was a pupil of Isaac Luria who devoted himself at the death of his master to the propagation of Lurianic Kabbalah, through which he gained many adherents in various parts of Italy. Among these, the most prominent were Menahem Azariah da Fano, whom he persuaded to spend large sums of money in the acquisition of Luria's manuscripts; and Aaron Berechiah of Modena, author of the Ma'avar Yabbok. Sarug also lectured in various places in Germany and in Amsterdam. In the latter city one of his disciples was Abraham Cohen de Herrera.

Sarug's school of Kabbalah has produced several major texts, including:

- Limudei Atzilut, the major compendium of Sarugian teachings on Kabbalah (Muncacz, 1897)
- Drush HaMalbush, another major publication in the Sarugian worldview (Jerusalem, 2001)
- "Shever Yosef", a summary of his basic teachings
- "Mayon Hachokhmah", often cited in Chabad Chassidus
- Kabbalah, a Kabbalistic essay published in the Matzref LaChochmah of Joseph Delmedigo (Basel, 1629)
- Hanhagot Yisrael, or Tikkun Keri/Keri Mikra (Salonica, 1752), a methodology of asceticism
- Kuntres Ne'im Zemirot Yisrael, a commentary on three of Luria's piyyutim for Shabbat (Nowy Oleksiniec, 1767)
- Gilgulei Neshamot, published under the name of Menahem Azariah da Fano, a collection of traditions regarding identifications of soul transmigrations (Jerusalem, 2001)

Additionally, Rabbi Naftali Hertz Bakhrakh's "Emeq Hamelekh" is heavily sarugian, although not exclusively so.

== Sarugian Kabbalah ==
Sarug's influence on Kabbalah, while not as authoritative within mainstream Jewish mysticism as the system of his contemporary Hayyim Vital, has exerted significant influence on various thinkers throughout the development of Kabbalah and Hasidism. In contrast to Vital's tradition of Luria's doctrine, the Sarugian system is often described as displaying a more rigid logical structure and is claimed to have Aristotelian and Neoplatonist influences, especially by Gershom Scholem and Moshe Idel. Menahem Azariah da Fano and Abraham Cohen de Herrera are considered his two most prominent students, and da Fano's influence on Kabbalah in general is historically immense.

Key concepts in the exposition of Sarugian Kabbalah revolve around the Olam HaMalbush, an early emanation of Creation between Ein Sof and Adam Kadmon that provides the context and locale of all subsequent emanations.

Opposition to Sarug's system came from the accepted school of transmission of Luria's Kabbalah, whose chief expositor was Hayyim Vital. Today, while most students of Kabbalah learn the systems descended from Vital's transmission of Luria's teachings, there remain certain schools, especially among Hasidic and Sephardic traditions, that maintain a syncretic approach between Vital and Sarug's systems. This is especially noticeable in Chabad, and is made explicit in the thought of Yitzchak Meir Morgenstern.
