= Hayim de lah Rozah =

Spanish rabbi and kabbalist

Personal life
- Born: Spain
- Notable work: Torat Hakham
- Other names: Chaim Delharoza, de la Rosa
- Occupation: Rabbi, kabbalist

Religious life
- Religion: Judaism

Hayim de lah Rozah (also spelled Chaim Delharoza or de la Rosa) was a Spanish rabbi and kabbalist.

He belonged to a family from the Spanish expulsion, he wandered until he reached Jerusalem where he joined the chavurah of Rabbi Shalom Sharabi, becoming a scholar of the Beit El Synagogue and a close disciple and friend of Rabbi Sharabi.

Rabbi de lah Rozah authored the sefer Torat Hakham.

Rabbi de lah Rozah lived in the 1700s, long after the Spanish expulsion in 1492. He was in Greece and Jerusalem, and was a student of Rabbi Shalom Sharabi who died in 1777.
