= Shalom Sharabi =

Orthodox rabbi and kabbalist

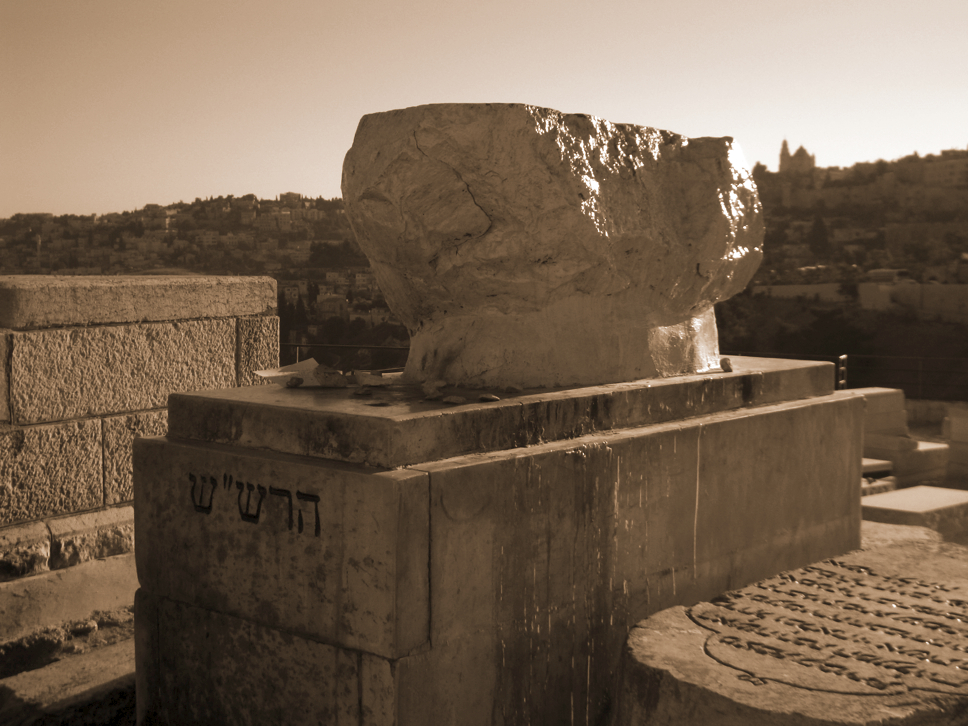
- Sar Shalom Sharabi's tomb on the Mount of Olives

Personal life
- Born: 1720 Shara'b As Salam, Yemen, Ottoman Empire
- Died: January 18, 1777 (aged 56–57) Jerusalem, Ottoman Empire
- Buried: Mount of Olives Jewish Cemetery

Religious life
- Religion: Judaism

Sar Shalom Sharabi (Hebrew: שר שלום מזרחי דידיע שרעבי), also known as the Rashash, the Shemesh or Rabbi Shalom Mizraḥi deyedi`a Sharabi (1720–1777) was a Yemenite Rabbi, Halachist, Chazzan and Kabbalist. In later life, he became the Rosh Yeshiva of Bet El Yeshiva in the Old City of Jerusalem. His daughter married Rabbi Hayyim Abraham Gagin of Jerusalem, making him the great-great-grandfather of Shem Tob Gaguine, the "Keter Shem Tob." His son was Yitzhak Mizrahi Sharabi and his grandson was Chief Rabbi Chaim Abraham Gagin.

== Biography ==
Sar Shalom Sharabi was born in Jewish Sharab, Yemen. He moved to Jerusalem, then under Ottoman rule, in fulfilment of a vow. On his way he stayed in India, Baghdad and Damascus. In Damascus, he was involved in a dispute of Halacha over the minimum olive size kezayit of matzah that one should eat at the Pesach Seder.

In Jerusalem, he made a strong impression on the local rabbinic sages, and is frequently mentioned in their books. At Bet El Yeshiva, he belonged to a group of 12 mekubalim along with Hida, Torat Hakham, Rabbi Yom-Tov Algazi and other sages of Sephardic and Yemenite congregations. He remained at Bet El Yeshiva until his death, eventually becoming Rosh Yeshiva. He himself was a devotee of the teachings of Rabbi Isaac Luria, and a principal innovator within Lurianic Kabbalah.

Popular tradition links his departure from Yemen with a miracle that occurred after a rich Muslim woman tried to seduce him. In Bet El, he worked as a servant and hid his learning from others; when his knowledge of Kabbalah was accidentally discovered, he became a member of the kabbalistic circle. According to legend, the prophet Elijah appeared to him, and he is understood by the major Kabbalists as being himself the Gilgul of the Arizal. His grandson, Solomon Moses Hai Gagin Sharabi, wrote a poem of praise on his mastery of the Etz Hayyim and Shemonah She'arim of Hayyim Vital. Members of Bet El continue to prostrate themselves on his grave on the Mount of Olives on the anniversary of his death.

Sharabi is credited with the miracle that opened the Kotel to Jews.

== Writings ==
He was one of the earlier commentators on the works of the Ari, a major source of Kabbalah. His Siddur was known as the "Siddur Ha-Kavvanot," and is the main siddur used today by Kabbalists for prayer, meditation and Yeshiva study. It is a siddur with extensive Kabbalistic meditations by way of commentary.

His writings include "Emet va-Shalom", "Rehovot Hanahar", "Derech Shalom" and "Nahar Shalom" (edited by Yedidyah Raphael Chai Abulafiya), in which he answers 70 questions of the Hahamim of Tunis, who were among the leading Sephardic authorities in the 18th century. He also commented on the minhagim (customs) of the Yemenite Jews and compiled them in volumes known as "Minhagei Rashash", an exclusive edition of the Shulchan Aruch, where he gives his interpretations of the halachot, as well as noting the particular customs of the Shami Yemenite community. These volumes are still actively used by this community to reach Halachic decisions regarding holidays, marriage and Shabbat services.
