= Tel Arza =

Neighborhood in Jerusalem

Coordinates: 31°47′42″N 35°12′55″E

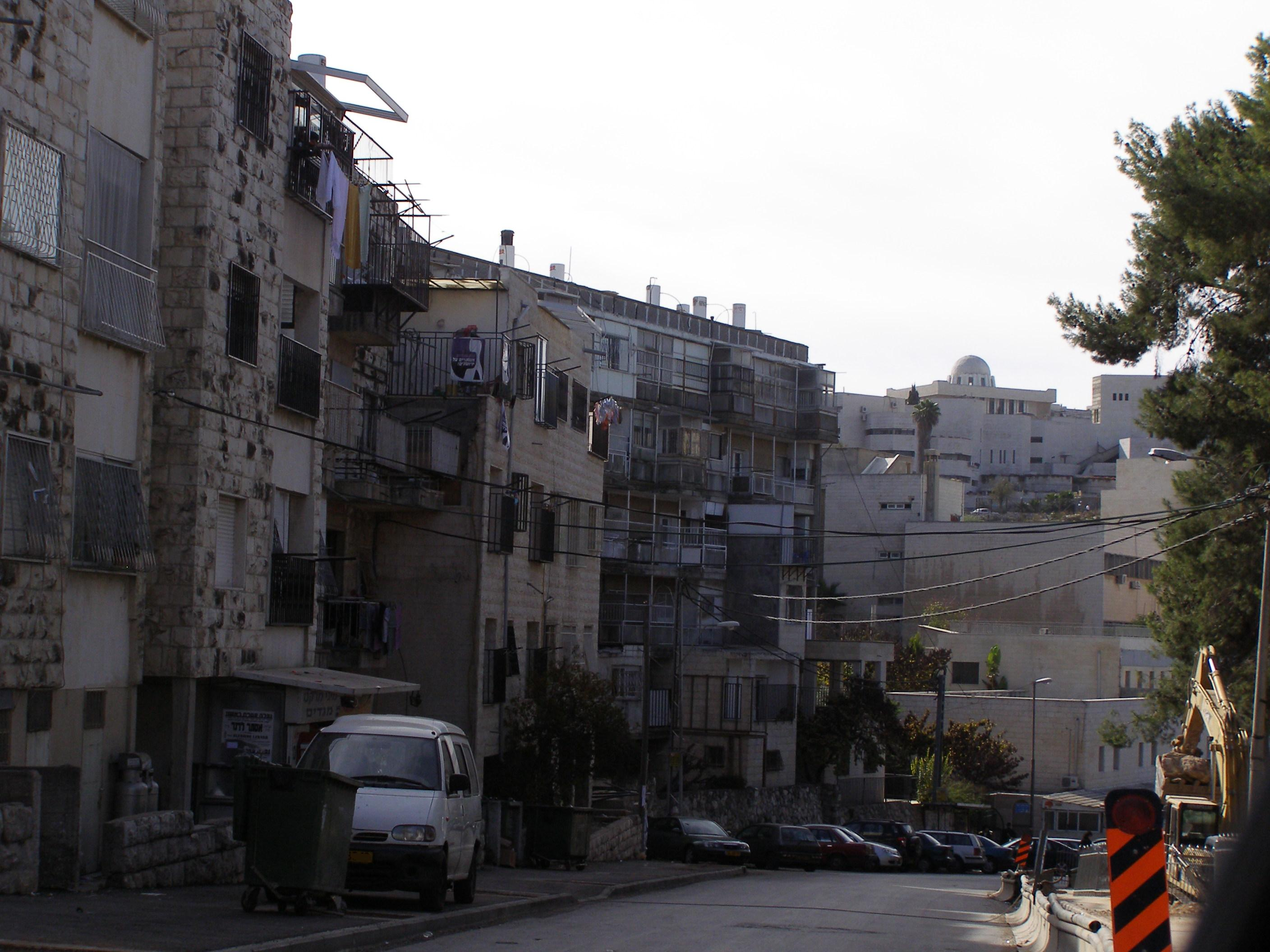
Hannah Street in the neighbourhood.

Tel Arza (Hebrew: תל ארזה) is a Hareidi (ultra-Orthodox Jewish) neighborhood in northern Jerusalem. It is bordered by Ezrat Torah on the west, Shikun Chabad on the south, the Bukharim quarter on the east, and Sanhedria on the north.

Tel Arza was established in 1931, as part of the expansion experienced in the traditional Jewish community, the Old Yishuv, while recovering from the 1929 anti-Jewish riots.

Its name is taken from the Mishna, where it is described as a place where Jews were murdered.

== Ancient Jewish burial cave ==
In 2014, an elaborate Jewish burial cave, part of the Second Temple period necropolis of Jerusalem, was discovered in Tel Arza. Initially documented by K. Galling in 1935, and later believed to be lost, the cave's location resurfaced following the demolition of an old building during construction works. The structure was carved into white meleke limestone. Its unique two-story façade, unlike other monumental burial caves in Jerusalem, prompted two alternative construction options: one with pillars supporting a stepped pyramidal structure, and another featuring a rectangular superstructure, inspired by Herodian and Roman architectural styles.
