= Menachem Mendel Taub =

Hasidic rebbe

Menachem Mendel Taub מנחם מנדל טאוב
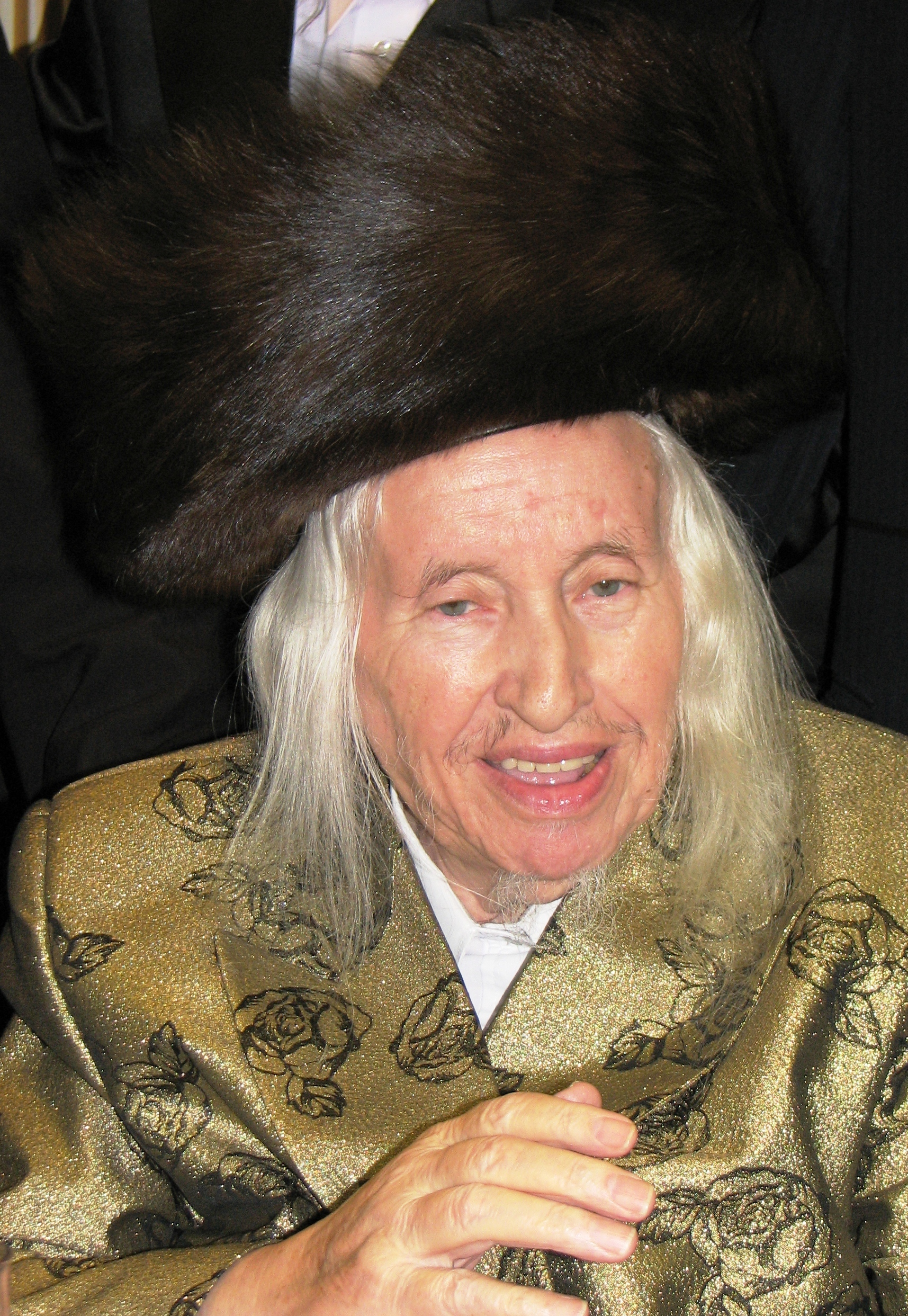
- Title: Kaliver Rebbe

Personal life
- Born: Menachem Mendel Taub; 1923 Marghita, Kingdom of Romania
- Died: 28 April 2019 (aged 95–96)
- Spouse: Chana Sarah Shapiro, Sheindel Malnik
- Parent: Rabbi Yehudah Yechiel Taub (father)
- Dynasty: Kaliv

Religious life
- Religion: Judaism

Jewish leader
- Main work: Kol Menachem
- Dynasty: Kaliv

Menachem Mendel Taub (Hebrew: מנחם מנדל טאוב; 1923 – 28 April 2019) was the Rebbe of the Kaliv (Rozlo) Hasidic dynasty in Jerusalem.

== Biography ==
Menachem Mendel Taub was the son of Rabbi Yehuda Yechiel Taub, the Rozler Rov, and son-in-law of Grand Rabbi Pinchos Shapiro, the Kechneyer Rebbe, scion of the Nadvorna dynasty. He was born in Transylvania, the seventh in a direct paternal line to the founder of the dynasty, Rabbi Yitzchak Izak of Kaliv, a disciple of Elimelech of Lizhensk. He had six brothers and sisters. His second cousin, Rabbi Moshe Taub, is the Kalover Rebbe in Brooklyn, New York.

Taub married his first wife, Chana Sara Shapiro, before the start of World War II.

In 1944, he was deported to Auschwitz concentration camp, arriving there three days before Shavuot. While in Auschwitz, he was experimented upon by Josef Mengele. Because of "chemical burning experiments", he was unable to grow facial hair; he also had an unusually high-pitched voice, and was rendered sterile, unable to have children. He was transferred from Auschwitz to the Breslau concentration camp, and later to Bergen-Belsen. Six months after the war ended, he reunited with his wife in Sweden. In 1947, they immigrated to the United States and settled in Cleveland, Ohio.

He and his wife immigrated to Israel in 1962. The following year he founded Kiryas Kaliv in Rishon LeZion. The foundation stone was laid on 7 Adar 5723 (3 March 1963), the day of the yahrtzeit of the founder of the dynasty, Grand Rabbi Yitzchak Isak Taub. Several years later, he moved his headquarters to Bnei Brak. In 2004, Taub's court moved to Jerusalem.

Taub's first wife, Chana Sara, died in 2010. On Lag BaOmer 2012, he remarried 55-year-old Sheindel Malnik of Bnei Brak. The marriage was short-lived, and they later divorced.

== Rabbinic career ==
After World War II, Rabbi Taub actively spoke about the Holocaust and frequently invoked the memory of the Jewish martyrs. He encouraged the recital of "Shema Yisrael" to memorialize Holocaust victims at the conclusion of religious events in Israel. He also traveled to interact with millions of Jews by telling his story and encouraging the saying of "Shema Yisrael". He was also active in Jewish outreach and conducted regular lectures for groups of professionals, including doctors and police officers. In addition, a network of kollels, an encyclopedia project, and several other divisions of Kaliv have been founded.

In March 2014, he participated in the annual conference of the Rabbinical Congress of Europe, which met in Budapest to commemorate the 70th anniversary of the destruction of Hungarian Jewry. He delivered an emotion-laden speech in Hebrew and switched to English to direct remarks to US President Barack Obama and Russian President Vladimir Putin.

== Lineage ==
- Grand Rabbi Yitzchak Izak Taub of Kaliv (1751–1821)
  - Grand Rabbi Moshe Chaim Taub of Kaliv-Zidichov (died 1831): son of Rabbi Yitzchak Izak, son-in-law of Rabbi Tzvi of Zidichov
    - Grand Rabbi Shlomo Taub of Kaliv-Rozlo (1820–1879): son of rabbi Moshe Chaim, son-law of his uncle, Rabbi Yehuda Tzvi Eichenstein of Rozlo
      - Grand Rabbi Yehuda Tzvi Taub of Kaliv-Rozlo (1849–1886)
        - Rabbi Pinchas Chaim Taub Chief Rabbi of Rozlo (d. 1936): son of Rabbi Yehuda Tzvi and author of Toras Chesed, Ohel Moed, and Alufei Yehudo; lived in Margareten during World War I
          - Rabbi Yehuda Yechiel Taub, Chief Rabbi of Rozlo (d. 1938): son of Rabbi Pinchos Chaim and author of Lev Someach heChodosh
            - Grand Rabbi Menachem Mendel Taub of Kaliv, (1923–2019)

== Published works ==
- Kol Menachem, a 13-volume work on the Torah and Jewish holidays
- Shema Yisrael, a 2-volume encyclopedia on the Holocaust (Hebrew)
- Shema Yisrael: Testimonies of devotion, courage, and self-sacrifice, 1939–1945 (English)
