= Ezrat Torah =

Neighbourhood in Jerusalem

Coordinates: 31°47′50″N 35°12′49″E

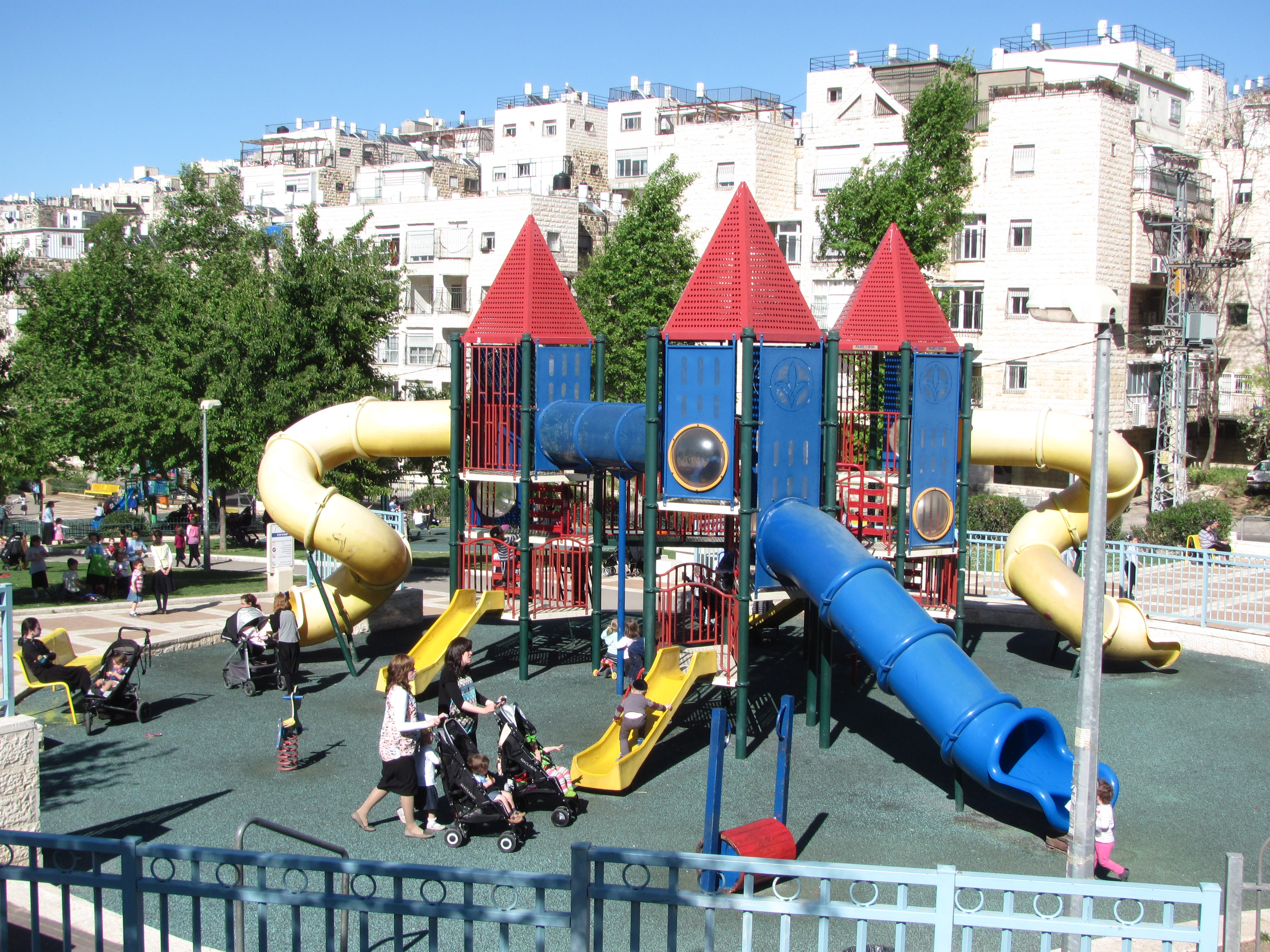
Ezrat Torah park

Ezrat Torah (Hebrew: עזרת תורה, in Ashkenazi Hebrew pronunciation: Ezras Torah) is a Haredi neighborhood in northern Jerusalem. It is bordered by Kiryat Sanz on the west, Golda Meir Blvd. on the north and east, and Shikun Chabad and Tel Arza on the south.

== History ==
Founded around 1970, Ezrat Torah is named for the Ezras Torah Fund, a Jewish American charitable organization.

== Notable people ==
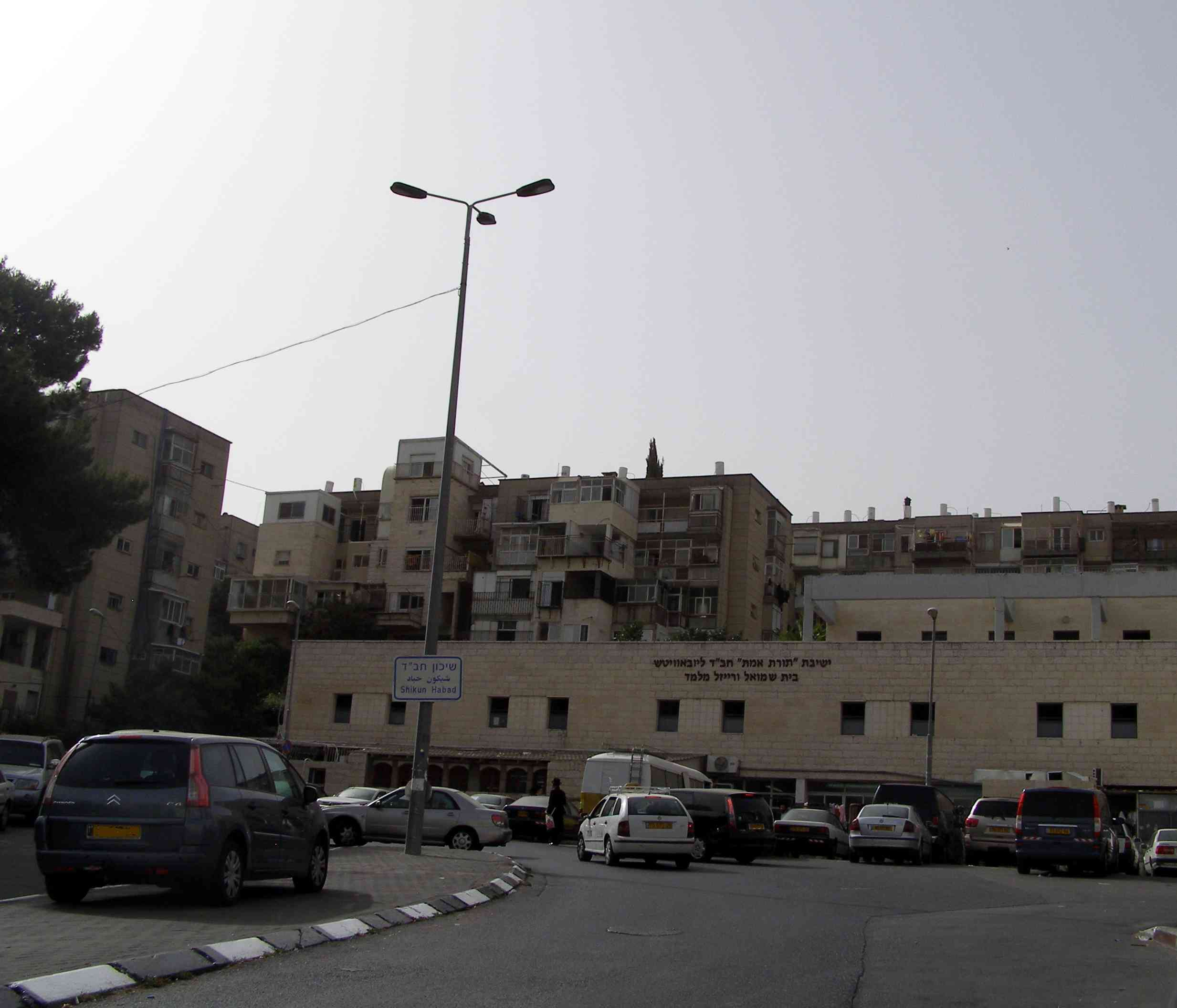
A street along the border of Ezrat Torah and Shikun Chabad

Rabbi Yechiel Michel Stern, an author who is considered an expert on the halakhot of the Four Species, has served as the Rav of Ezrat Torah since the 1970s. The Kapishnitzer Rebbe, Rabbi Yitzchak Meir Palintenstein, brought his Hasidut there in 1975. Other rabbis who live there include: Rabbi Shmuel Rabinovitch, Rabbi of the Western Wall and the Holy Sites of Israel Rabbi Yitzchok Tuvia Weiss, Gaavad of the Edah HaChareidis.
