= Kaliv (Hasidic dynasty) =

Hungarian Hasidic dynasty

Kaliv is a Hasidic dynasty founded by Yitzchak Isaac Taub (1744–1821) of Nagykálló (in Yiddish Kalev, Kaalov, Kaliv), Hungary.

== History ==
=== Rabbi Yitzchak Isaac Taub ===
Rabbi Taub (1751 - 7 Adar 2, March 21, 1821) was the rabbi of Kalov and the first Hassidic Rebbe in Hungary. He was discovered by Rabbi Leib Sarah's, a disciple of the Baal Shem Tov. Rabbi Leib first met Rabbi Isaac when he was a small shepherd boy. Rabbi Leib told his mother, a widow, that her son was destined to be a great Tzaddik. He took the small child to Nikolsburg to learn with Rabbi Shmelke of Nikolsburg. Rabbi Isaac grew to be a great rebbe and was known as "the Sweet Singer of Israel". He composed many popular Hasidic melodies. Often he adapted Hungarian folk songs, which were transformed by him to sacred songs. He taught that the tunes he heard were really from the Holy Temple in Jerusalem, and were lost among the nations over the years, and he found them and returned them to the Jewish people. He said that the proof that it was true was that the gentile who would teach him the song would forget it as soon as the rebbe learned it. He was famous for composing the traditional Hungarian Hasidic tune "Szól a kakas már".

== Today ==
Today, the Kaliver dynasty has two branches, in Jerusalem and New York. The rebbe in Jerusalem is known as the Kaliver Rebbe, (Hebrew: אדמו"ר מקאליב) and the rebbe in New York as the Kalover Rebbe, (Hebrew: אדמו"ר מקאלוב).

=== Jerusalem ===
Grand Rebbe Menachem Mendel Taub was the Kaliver Rebbe in Israel. He was the son of the Rozler Rov and son-in-law of Grand Rabbi Pinchos Shapiro, the Kechneyer Rebbe, scion of the Nadvorna Dynasty.

In 1944, he was deported to Auschwitz by the Nazis, arriving there three days before Shavuos. He was transferred from there to the Warsaw Ghetto and the Breslau concentration camp, and later to Bergen-Belsen. Six months after the war ended, he discovered that his wife had survived, and they were reunited in Sweden. In 1947, they migrated to the United States of America, where he began his work in memorializing the Holocaust in Cleveland, Ohio .

Moving to Israel in 1962, he established Kiryas Kaliv in Rishon LeZion. The foundation stone was laid on 7 Adar 5723 (3 March 1963), the day of the Yahrtzeit of the founder of the dynasty, Grand Rabbi Isaac Taub. Several years later, he moved his headquarters to Bnei Brak. In 2004, the rebbe's court moved to Jerusalem.

Since World War II, the rebbe has traveled to millions of Jews with his story and the saying of Shema Yisrael. He is also active in Jewish outreach and holds regular lectures for groups of professionals, including doctors and police officers. In addition, a network of Kollelim, an encyclopedia project, and several other divisions of Kaliv have been founded.

He died on April 28, 2019, at the age of 96.

At his funeral, it was announced that his step-grandson-in-law Rabbi Yisrael Mordechai Yoel Horowitz would be his successor.

Currently, Rabbi Horowitz is building a holocaust museum upstairs from the Kaliv beis midrash in Israel, a project the previous Rebbe had initiated. A focus of the museum will be on the rabbis who were murdered in the Holocaust.

=== New York ===
Grand Rebbe Moses Taub, the Kalover Rebbe, heads a synagogue in the Williamsburg section of Brooklyn. His father was the previous Kalover Rebbe, Grand Rabbi Menachem Shlomo Taub, the author of Chakal Tapuchin. He was known for his world-travels where he would deliver lectures and private audiences to encourage Jews of all types to increase their commitment to Judaism. In the past few years, he has been paralyzed by ALS, yet he continues to write Torah commentaries daily, via computer, and continues his outreach work despite his illness.

== Lineage of Dynasty ==
- Grand Rabbi Isaac Taub of Kaliv (1751-1821)
  - Grand Rabbi Moshe Chaim Taub of Kaliv-Zidichov (died 1831)—son of Rabbi Isaac, son-in-law of Rabbi Tzvi of Zidichov
    - Grand Rabbi Shlomo Taub of Rozlo (1820-1879)—son of rabbi Moshe Chaim, son-law of his uncle, Rabbi Yehuda Tzvi Eichenstein of Rozlo
      - Grand Rabbi Yehuda Tzvi Taub of Rozlo (1849-1886)
        - Rabbi Pinchas Chaim Taub Chief Rabbi of Rozlo (d. 1936)—son of Rabbi Yehuda Tzvi and author of Toras Chesed, Ohel Moed and Alufei Yehudo; lived in Margareten during World War I
          - Rabbi Yehuda Yechiel Taub, Chief Rabbi of Rozlo (d. 1938)—son of Rabbi Pinchos Chaim and author of Lev Someach heChodosh
            - Grand Rabbi Menachem Mendel Taub of Rozlo-Kaliv (1923-2019), Kaliver Rebbe of Jerusalem
              - Grand Rabbi Yisrael Mordechai Yoel Horowitz (present Kaliver Rebbe)
        - Grand Rabbi Moshe Taub of Kalov (approximately 1870-May 11, 1936)— son of Rabbi Yehuda Tzvi and author of Es Ratzon
          - Grand Rabbi Menachem Shlomo Taub of Kalov (1901-1978), author of Chakal Tapuchin
            - Grand Rabbi Moshe Taub of Kalov (present Kaliver Rebbe)
