= Beit El Kabbalist yeshiva =

Kabbalist yeshiva in Jerusalem

- ישיבת המקובלים בית אל
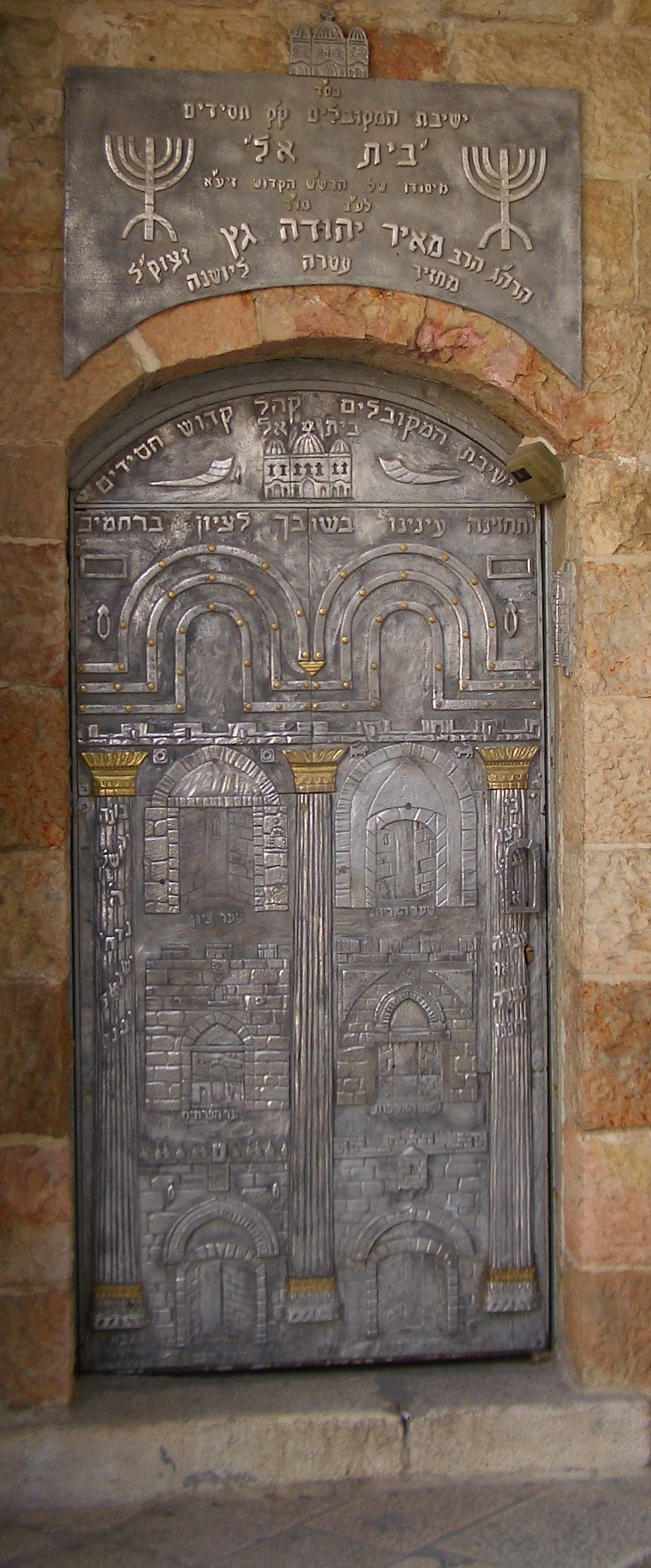
- Entrance door to the Yeshivat haMekubalim, depicting all 7 gates in Jerusalem's Old City Walls

Location
- Old City in Jerusalem; Israel; 31°46′30″N 35°13′54″E

Information
- Type: Yeshiva
- Religious affiliation: Orthodox Judaism
- Established: 1737
- Founder: Rabbi Gedaliah Hayon
- Rosh yeshiva: Rabbi Yisrael Avi`hai
- Gender: Males
- Language: Hebrew

The Beit El Kabbalist yeshiva (Beit El means "House of God") (also: Midrash Hasidim 'School of the Devout' or Yeshivat haMekubalim, 'Yeshiva of the Kabbalists') is a center of kabbalistic study in Jerusalem. It consists of two buildings, one in the Ruhama neighbourhood of West Jerusalem, built in 1948, and another in Old City’s Jewish Quarter, built in 1974.

== History ==
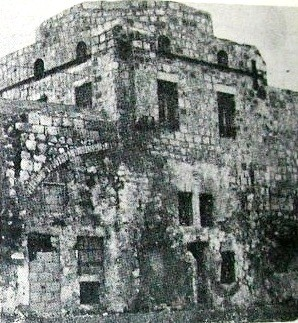
Beit El Yeshiva in the Jewish Quarter in the 1930s

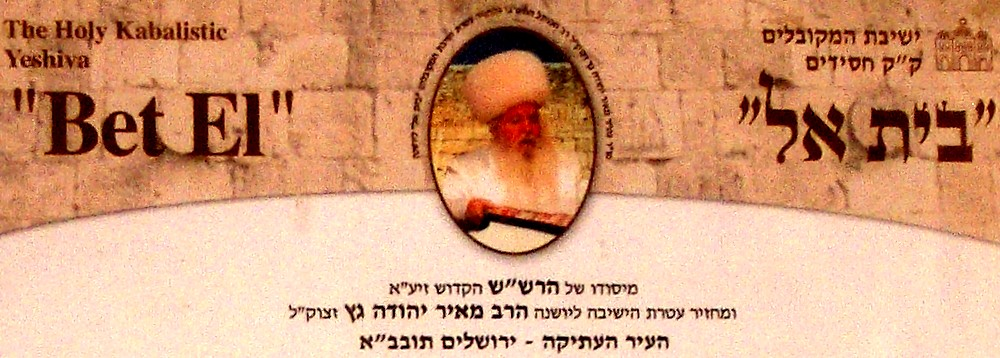
Headed notepaper of the Yeshiva depicting a photograph of Rabbi Meir Yehuda Getz

The yeshiva was founded in 1737 by Rabbi Gedaliah Hayon, originally from Constantinople, for the study of kabbalah in the Holy City. In the 1740s, a gifted young man named Shalom Mizrachi Sharabi arrived in Jerusalem from Yemen. He studied at Beit El and over time became an outstanding scholar and kabbalist. At the behest of Rabbi Hayon, he was appointed head of the yeshiva.

Under Sharabi’s leadership the yeshiva grew and became one of the main yeshivas in Jerusalem with 40 scholars from the Sephardic and Ashkenazi communities. Rabbi Hayon had organized the life of the yeshiva around prayer services, which through mystical communion with God would bring the scholars closer to understanding the secret teachings of Kabbalah. Rabbi Sharabi initiated regulations, orders and kavanot ("intentions") of the daily prayers according to the Nahar Shalom prayer book (Salonika, 1806/5566) which he authored, continuing the teachings of the Arizal and following its cosmological approach while incorporating kabbalistic symbolism, entreaties and thoughts/meditations. Known today as the Siddur haRashash, it remained, together with the Etz `Haim of Rabbi `Haim Vital, the focus of kabbalistic studies in the yeshiva.

The scholars were divided into four groups. The first awoke at midnight to say Tikkun Hatzot and learn the Kabbalah of the Arizal until dawn. The second delved into the works of the Arizal from after shacharit (morning prayers) until midday. The third group learnt the Mishna with Rabbi Ovadia mi’Bartenura’s commentary from midday till nightfall. After ma’ariv (evening prayers) the fourth set of scholars would arrive and learn the Talmud and the Shulchan Aruch.

As the yeshiva's reputation spread it attracted prominent rabbis, among them were Chaim Joseph David Azulai, Avraham Gershon of Kitov, Menachem Mendel of Shklov and Yom Tov Algazi.

In 1757, Rabbi Sharabi chose twelve select disciples who were to form a special group called Ahavat Shalom (love of peace). They signed a pledge of eternal friendship which hung on the door of the Holy Ark in the yeshiva. Part of the document reads: "..all twelve of us shall be as one glorious soul…that if God forbid one of us encounters misfortune, we will all assist him.." One of the stipulations was that if a son was born to one of the group, three members would go to learn Torah by the newborn's side every night until its circumcision to act as a safeguard for the child. On the night before the brit milah the whole group was instructed to visit and study there.

The yeshiva premises remained in the hands of the leading kabbalists of each generation who inherited the apartment on the top floor.

In the late 1800s, the writings of Dr Eliezer Levy, who escorted Sir Moses Montefiore around Jerusalem, describe of how they visited the place where "they pray all year round according to the mystical meanings of the Arizal from midnight till the afternoon, and from then till the evening they study Talmud and Zohar." The authoritative Sefer Etz `Haim of Rabbi `Haim Vital was for the first time printed under the auspices of the yeshiva around 1866. Distinguished scholars of Kabbalah continued to emigrate to Jerusalem in order to study in the yeshiva. Among the outstanding luminaries, Rabbi Hayim Shaul Dweck HaKohen, Rabbi Shaul Kassin (the father of the famed leader of Syrian Jewry, Rabbi Yaakov Kassin), and Rabbi Avraham Ades (the master of the Baba Sali) were drawn there from Syria in order to dedicate themselves to spiritual growth.

=== New building (1928) ===
The 1927 Jericho earthquake damaged the building, and the British Municipality ordered the building be demolished. No sooner had the order been received, plans got underway to rebuild, and eight months later, in March 1928, the new extended premises were completed.

In the 1930s, when the illustrious Chazon Ish was on his way to the Western Wall, he made a point of stopping by the yeshiva to study there, stating, “I have great merit to see the place where such great and holy people learnt and prayed."

During the 1948 War of Independence, the contents of the building were looted and the building was desecrated.

=== New City (1948) and Old City (1974) ===
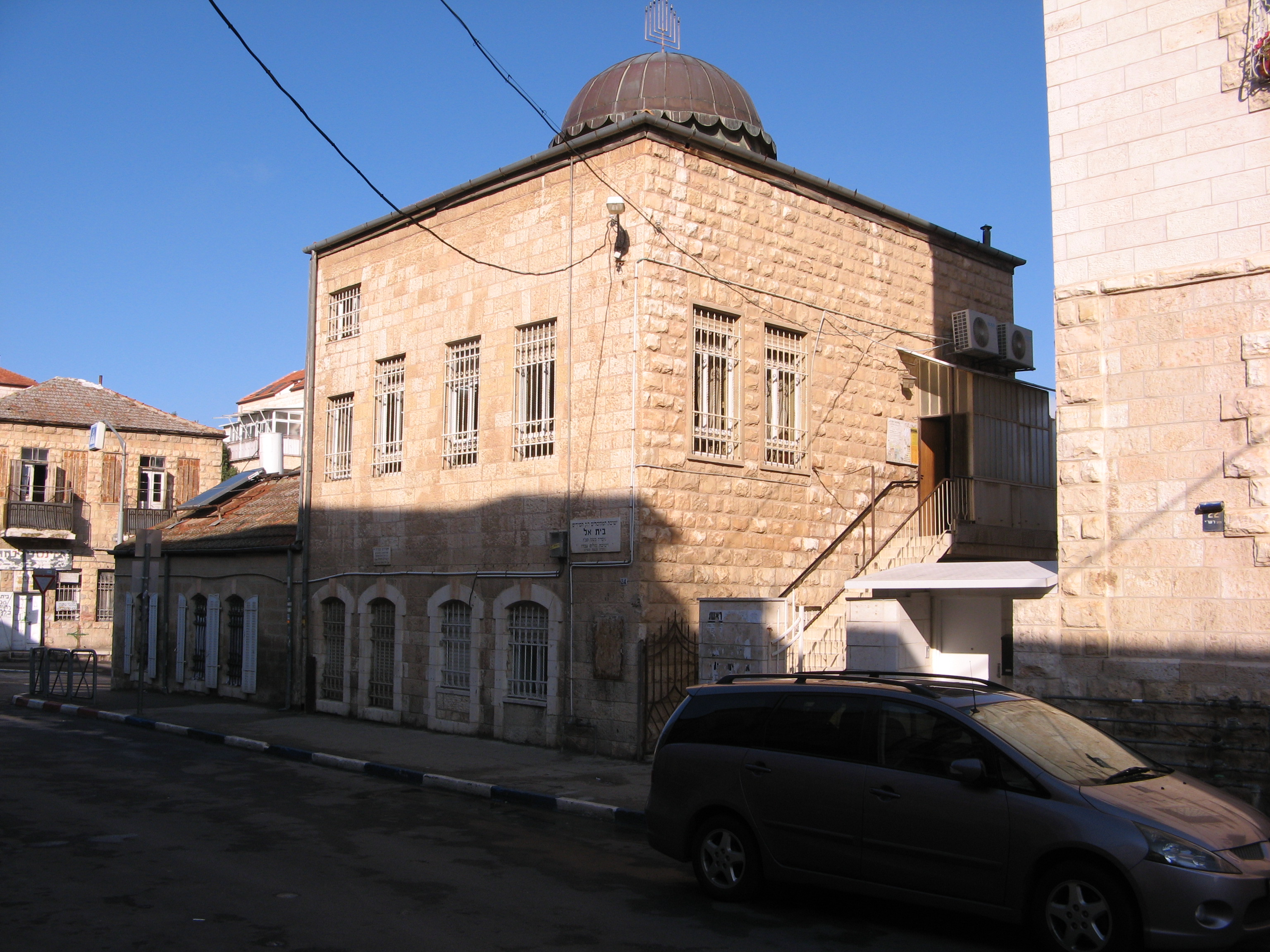
Beit El on Rechov Rashi, Ruchama

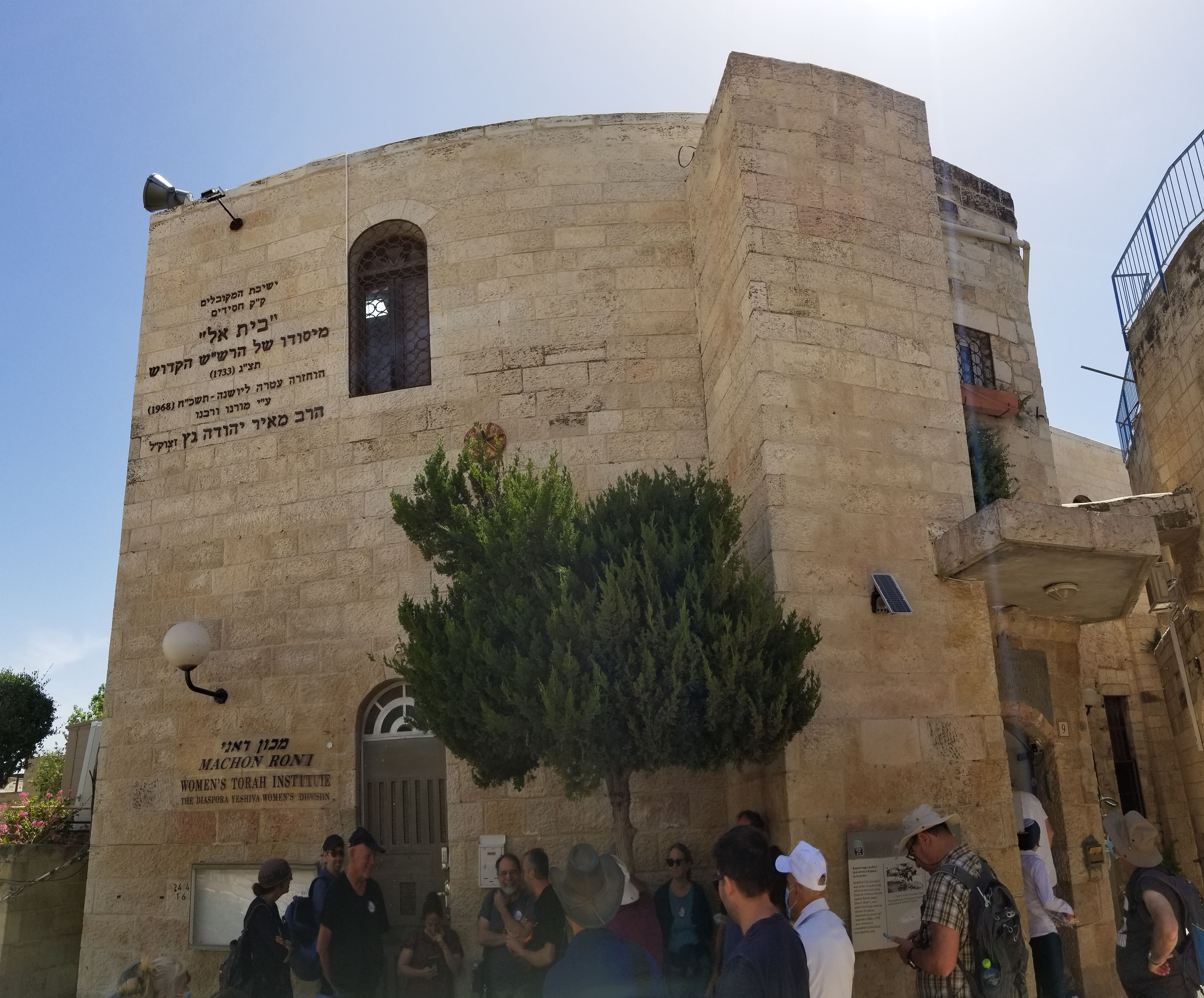
Beit El on the Jewish Quarter

The son of Rabbi Shalom Hedaya (who was head of Bet El from 1927 to 1945, following the leadership of Rabbi Yedidyah Raphael Chai Abulafiya and Rabbi Massoud Alhadad), Rabbi Ovadia Hedaya, set to work on schemes to revive the study of Kabbalah in the spirit of Bet El. Rabbi Ovadia Hedaya did so on the roof of his house on Rashi street before taking on the task in 1958 of rebuilding the yeshiva in the new section of the city on the very street where he lived.

In 1974, six years after the liberation of the Jewish Quarter, on the very site of the former Beit El yeshiva in the Old City, the Beit El Yeshiva was re-established (at first under the cryptic name Rishpei Esh, as understood from the Shir haShirim) under the aegis of Rabbi Yehuda Getz, a noted kabbalist, who until his death was the official rabbi of the Western Wall area. The Rashi Street yeshiva remains in existence.

On 13 September 1995, a ceremony took place celebrating the completion of refurbishment to the yeshiva in the Old City, at this time also renamed Yeshivat HaMekubalim Beit El. Upon Rabbi Guez's death, his foremost student (talmid muvhaq) was chosen as Rosh Yeshiva of the Old City site.

One of the most famous alumni of the yeshiva was Rabbi Yitzchak Kaduri, who died in January 2006. The Rosh Yeshiva Rabbi Shalom Mordekhai Haim Hedaya died in March 2010. Rabbi Raphael Hedaya was appointed as caretaker Rosh Yeshiva of Beit El at the Rashi Street yeshiva until the year of mourning was passed.

The current Rosh Yeshiva of Beit El in the Old City is Rabbi Yisrael Avi`hai.

== See also ==
- Shaar Hashamayim Yeshiva
- History of the Jews in Israel
- List of yeshivas in Israel
