= Lamel =

Lamel may refer to:

== Surname ==
- Lori Lamel
- Simon von Lämel
- Elise Herz, née von Lämel (1788–1868) was a Prague-born Austrian philanthropist

== Other ==
- Lamel Hill, historical site in York, England
- Lämel School of Jerusalem, named after Simon von Lämel

== See also ==
- Lemel
- Lämmel/Lammel
- Lemmel
- de:Lämmle
- Laemmle
