= Avraham Arnon =

Israeli educator

- אברהם ארנון
- Born: 1887; Cherykaw, Russian Empire (now Belarus)
- Died: 24 May 1960 (aged 72–73)
- Citizenship: Israel
- Occupation: Educator
- Known for: Head inspector of the Israeli state school system
- Awards: Israel Prize (1960)

Avraham Arnon (Hebrew: אברהם ארנון; born 1887, died 24 May 1960) was an Israeli educator and a recipient of the Israel Prize.

== Biography ==
Avraham Arnon was born in Cherykaw in the Russian Empire (now in Belarus). His family later moved to the city of Polotsk, where he received his primary education. In 1909, he was accepted by the High School for Trade and Economics in Kiev. After graduating in 1914, he travelled to the United States and the United Kingdom to continue his pedagogic studies.

Arnon then immigrated to Mandate Palestine, becoming one of the first academic teachers in the country.

== Pedagogic career ==
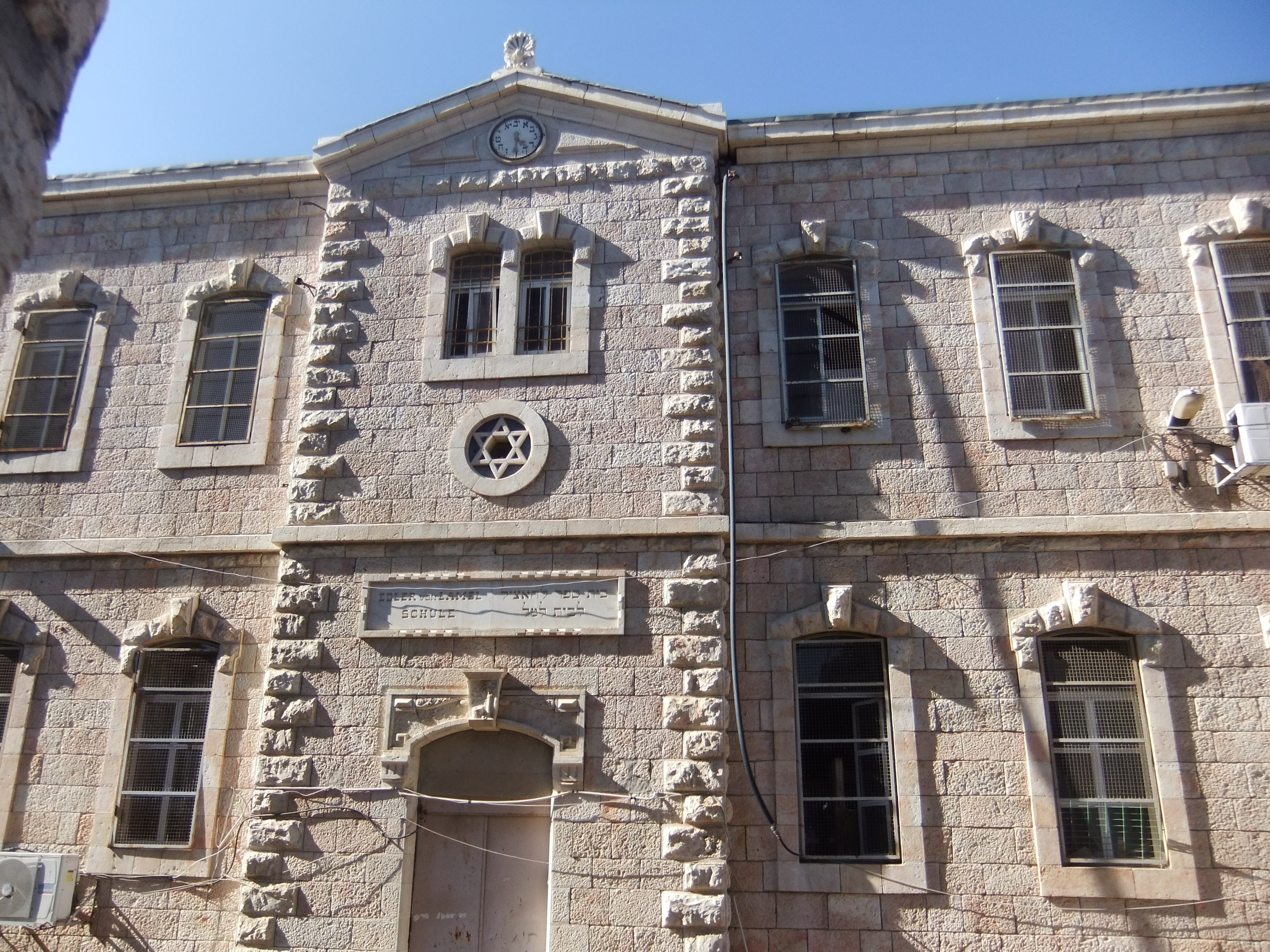
Facade of Lämel-Schule, Jerusalem

For 17 years he taught geography and mathematics at schools in Tel Aviv and Jerusalem, and was headmaster of Edler-von-Lämel-Schule (Hebrew: בֵּית סֵפֶר לְהָאָצִיל לְבֵית לֶמֶל, romanized: Beit Sefer lə-ha-Atzil lə-Veit Lämel) in Jerusalem's Zikhron Moshe neighborhood from 1920 to 1930. During this period, he also became active in the Teachers' Union and was elected chairman of its central committee. He was appointed as a school inspector in 1930.

After the establishment of the State of Israel in 1948, he was appointed head inspector of the state school system and later deputy director of the Ministry of Education and Culture under minister Zalman Shazar.

Until his retirement, he continued to serve in various key public positions in the sphere of state education, including Chief General Inspector from 1954 to 1955.

== Awards and recognition ==
- In 1960, Arnon was awarded the Israel Prize, in education, shortly before his death.
- The "Arnon" School in Ramat Gan and Tel Aviv is named after him.

== See also ==
- List of Israel Prize recipients
- Education in Israel
