= Touškov =

Touškov (German: Tuschkau)may refer to:

- Město Touškov, a town in Plzeň Region, Czech republic
- Ves Touškov, a community in Plzeň-South District, Czech Republic
- Touškov, a district in Mirovice, Czech Republic
