= Avraham Sharon =

Israeli philosopher, musician and scholar

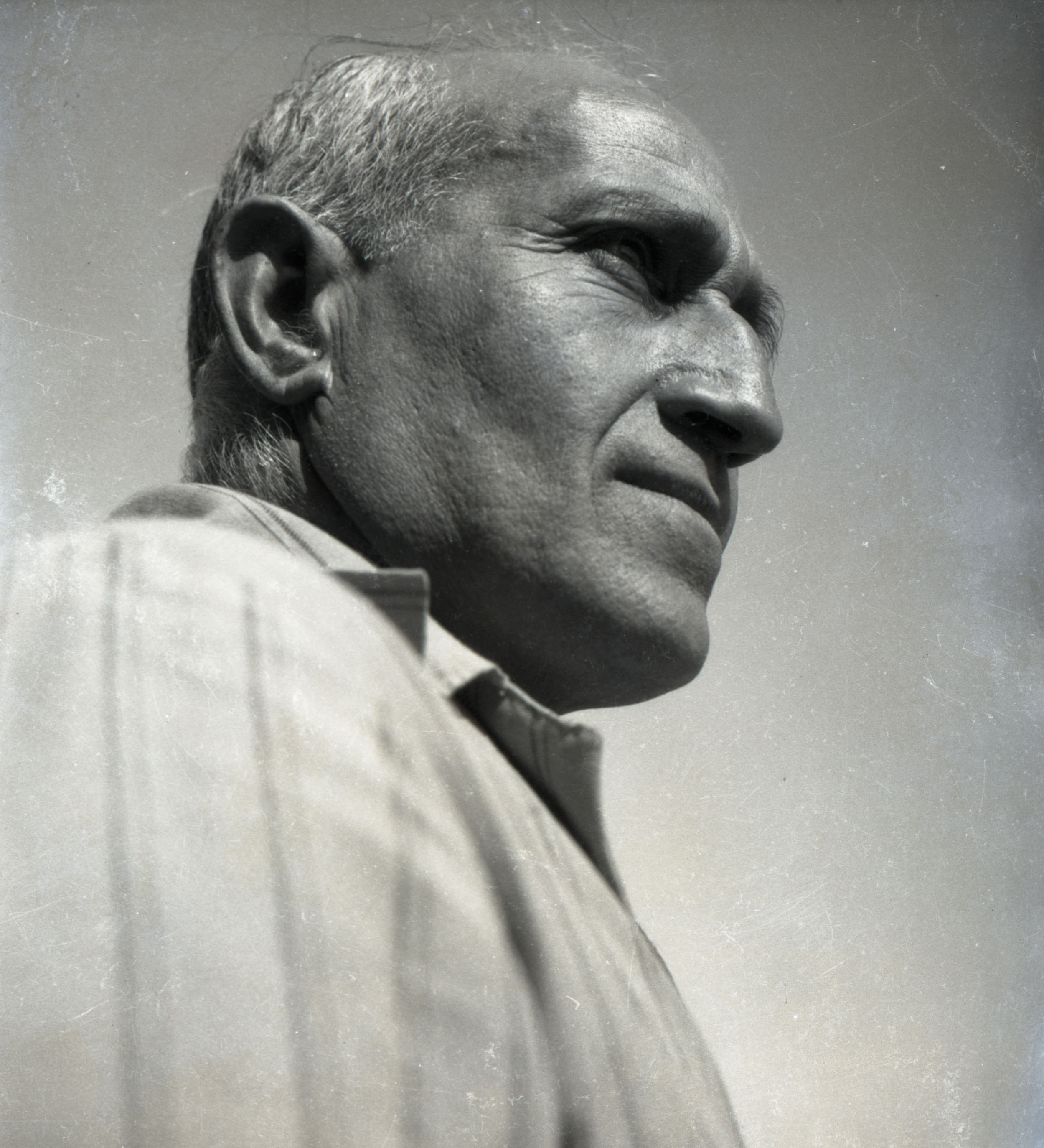
Sharon, February 1932

Avraham Sharon (Hebrew: אַבְרָהָם שָׁרוֹן; September 10, 1878 – October 17, 1957) was an Israeli philosopher, musician, scholar and publicist. Sharon established the Autographs and Portraits Collection in the National Library of Israel.

== Biography ==
Abraham Schwadron (later Avraham Sharon) was born in the village of Bieniów (now Zolochivka), near Zolochiv in Galicia (then a part of the Austro-Hungarian Empire). His parents were Isaac Schwadron, a beverage manufacturer, and Rivka Gelernter. In his childhood he studied with his uncle, Sholom Mordechai Schwadron (the Rabbi of Berezhany) and later on in the Jewish Gymnasium in Suceava. Sharon studied in the University of Vienna, where he received three doctoral degrees – in philosophy, law, and chemistry – the latter a profession he studied so he could help his father in his factory.

He established the Zionist Association in Zolochiv, studied Hebrew literature and Jewish history, and was member of HaTehiya ("rebirth"), an association established by Jewish students who spoke among themselves solely in Hebrew. In 1914 he moved to Vienna, fleeing from the Russian army that invaded Galicia, and there he published his first philosophical essay (De Nature Stalibus) and additional essays in the Osterreichische Wochenschrift newspaper, edited by Joseph Samuel Bloch.

Despite being a pacifist, Schwadron enlisted in the Austro-Hungarian Army in World War I. All through his military service he wrote about his impressions from the front line in Osterreichische Wochenschrift at the request of Bloch. During that time he also spread the "Heroic Zionism" idea among his friends, including David Horowitz, who described him as one of the founders of the Jewish pioneering school of thought. At the end of the war, he changed his last name to Sharon and was politically active in the Hapoel Hatzair youth group in Vienna.

In 1927, he made aliyah and started studying music and composed melodies for nine poems by Rachel. In a Jewish music concert held on November 14, 1935, in the Edison Theater in Jerusalem, three of Sharon's compositions were performed, together with works of Felix Mendelssohn, Ernest Bloch, Joel Engel and others. Sharon also wrote children's stories, literary criticism, articles and philosophical essays. He translated Hayim Nahman Bialik's The City of Slaughter into German, regularly published pamphlets on current events which he gave to his acquaintances, and letters to the editor. In 1935 Sharon married Gina Freudenberg. There was a large age difference between them, and it was not a happy marriage. They had one son, Isaac. In 1950, Gina moved to the United States with their son, while Sharon remained in Jerusalem. He spent most of his time in the National Library, appearing to his acquaintances as an unkempt eccentric.

He was a staunch believer in Hebrew labor (he mockingly called Arab work Avodah Zara, a pun on idolatry in Judaism), and the fulfillment of the Zionist vision. He sympathized with Beitar and Lehi, and joined the Jewish Work Guards — an organization whose members stood outside orchards barring entry to Arab workers. However, Sharon was not a supporter of any political party and defined himself as "anti-partisan". In his articles and letters he attacked public figures across the political board, but supported David Ben-Gurion as someone who put Zionism into practice.

In spite of the radical tone of Sharon's articles, they were favorably accepted even among those who opposed his views. Berl Katznelson, the editor of Davar, helped him by printing some of his articles and booklets. Dov Sadan wanted to write a monograph about him and Menachem Ussishkin published articles supportive of his ideas. After his immigration, he never left Israel. In his last years he wanted to visit his son in the United States, but could not afford it.

On September 12, 1957, he was run over while crossing Strauss Street in Jerusalem. He was hospitalized at Bikur Holim Hospital and died a few weeks later. He was buried, according to his wish, in the Sephardi lot in Har HaMenuchot.

== Autographs and Portraits Collection ==
In 1896, Sharon, reading a book by Moritz Güdemann, noted a facsimile of a medieval document which the author had some difficulty deciphering. Young Schwadron sent his own suggested reading of the document by mail and received a reply, written by Güdemann's hand. This reply became the first item in his Autographs and Portraits Collection, featuring acclaimed and prominent Jews, a collection he worked on his entire life. At first, he collected manuscripts of his contemporaries, but later on started looking for ancient manuscripts. In 1900 his father's house in Bieniow burned down, with about 200 items from his early collection.

For several decades, Sharon collected thousands of manuscripts and portraits of people from a variety of fields: rabbis and scholars, leaders of the Haskalah ("enlightenment") movement, Zionist leaders, businesspeople and economists, naturalists, scientists and technologists, doctors, historians, writers, poets and more – all Jewish, with a small amount of apostates, including Eighteen Nobel Prize laureates. Upon arriving in Palestine in 1927, Sharon donated his collection, estimated at a net worth US$2 million, to the National Library of Israel, and received employment there, curating the collection, for a meager salary. He held this position for the remainder of his life.

Close to his death, the collection held more than 17,000 autographs and portraits, ranging from the 15th Century to modern times. The collection includes letters, signatures, notes and lists, alongside complete manuscripts. The pinnacle of the collection is the original manuscript of Albert Einstein's theory of relativity. As a result of his research, Sharon found out that the printed portraits of the Baal Shem Tov, Dov Ber of Mezeritch, and Jacob Joseph of Polonne were forged. A chemical test of the ink and paper of letters attributed to the Baal Shem Tov from the Kherson Genizah revealed another forgery. He was also among those who voiced doubt about the authenticity of the picture of Maimonides.

Sharon's vision for the collection was for it to be used as a basis for a Jewish biographical research institute and museum, adjacent to the National Library of Israel, where the portrait gallery could be exhibited.

== Published works ==
- The Theory of Cruel Zionism, (תורת הציונות האכזרית), Tel Aviv, Am-Oved, 1944
