= Legler =

Legler is a surname. It may refer to:

- Casey Legler (born 1977), French female Olympic swimmer and model of men's clothes
- David Legler, record winning contestant on the Twenty-One game show
- George Phar Legler, early 20th century creator of the Valley of the Moon (Tucson, Arizona) children's fantasy park
- Henry Eduard Legler (1861–1917), Italian-American journalist, politician, and librarian
- John M. Legler, herpetologist and namesake of Legler's stream frog
- Julie Legler, American biostatistician and statistics educator
- Laurel Legler, producer of Detroit rock documentary MC5: A True Testimonial
- Matthias Legler, East German bobsledder
- Ron Legler, founder of Pulse nightclub
- Tim Legler (born 1966), American basketball player
- Wilhelm Legler (1875–1951), Austrian painter from Istria
