= Even Yisrael =

Even Yisrael (Hebrew: אבן ישראל, "Stone of Israel") may refer to:

- Even Yisrael (neighborhood) – historical neighborhood in Jerusalem, Israel
- Adin Even-Israel Steinsaltz (born 1937) – rabbi, scholar, philosopher and social critic
- Responsa of Yisroel Yaakov Fisher
