= Elise Herz =

Austrian philanthropist

Elise Herz, née von Lämel (1788–1868) was a Prague-born Austrian philanthropist. There she was made an honorary member of the Jewish community. Her father was the merchant Simon von Lämel. Her home in Prague was an intellectual center; however, upon her husband's death in 1850, she moved to Vienna.

Herz founded a children's asylum in Jerusalem, mainly for Jewish children, but a few Christian and Muslim children were accepted as well. Ludwig August Frankl was commissioned to organize it. This entry from the 1906 Jewish Encyclopedia about a "children's asylum" refers to the school she founded in her father's memory in the Zikhron Moshe neighbourhood of the city, better known as the Simon von Lämel School or simply Lämel School.
