= Lemel =

Lemel (Hebrew: למל) is a surname. Notable people with the surname include:

- Hannah Poland, later Lemel (1873 - 1942), English bird conservationist
- Derrick Lemel Stewart (born 1969), known professionally as Fatlip, Los Angeles–born hip hop musician
- Dorit Kemsley née Lemel (born 1976), American fashion designer and television personality
- Nathalie Lemel (1827–1921), French militant anarchist and feminist
- Yossi Lemel (born 1957), Israeli graphic designner

== Fictional characters ==
- Kuni Lemel from the 1880 Yiddish play and 1966 Israeli film musical Two Kuni Lemel

== See also ==
- Lemmel
- Lamel (disambiguation)
