= Sammel =

Sammel is a surname. Notable people with the surname include:

- David Sammel (born 1961), South African tennis coach and author
- Gwynn Sammel, South African tennis player, runner-up at 1977 Surrey Championships
- Hans-Joachim Sammel, German footballer in 1. FC Union Berlin in 1970–1971
- Kadri Sammel, Estonian musician in industrial band Forgotten Sunrise
- Jutta Sammel, child actor in French-Swiss film Let's Dance (2007)
- Mary D. Sammel, American biostatistician
- Richard Sammel (born 1960), German actor

== See also ==
- Battle of Sammel, fought in 1544 in India
