= Lämmel =

Lämmel is a surname. Notable people with the surname include:

- Andreas Lämmel (born 1959), German politician
- Inge Lammel, Inge Rackwitz (1924–2015), German musicologist
- Lukas Lämmel (born 1997), German footballer

== See also ==
- Sammel
