= Mary D. Sammel =

Biostatistician

Mary Dupuis Sammel is a biostatistician, who works as a professor in the Department of Biostatistics and Epidemiology in the Perelman School of Medicine at the University of Pennsylvania. As well as doing research on theoretical statistics^{[JRSS]} and reproductive health,^{[JAMA]}^{[OG]}^{[AGP]} she also raises guide dogs and has published research on their upbringing.^{[PNAS]}

== Education and career ==
Sammel graduated from the University of Michigan in 1986 with a bachelor's degree in statistics and completed a master's degree in applied statistics in 1988 at the same university. She did her doctoral studies at the Harvard School of Public Health, completing a Sc.D. in biostatistics in 1995.

== Work with guide dogs ==
Sammel and her family have been active at fostering future guide dogs, from infancy through puppyhood until they are ready to go on to more intensive training with The Seeing Eye as a guide dog.

With a student, Emily Bray, Sammel studied the effects of dogs' mothers' behavior on the dogs. Their work showed that dogs with overly-attentive mothers tended to be less effective as guide dogs, and less successful at completing guide dog training.^{[PNAS]}

== Recognition ==
In 2015, Sammel was elected as a Fellow of the American Statistical Association.

== Selected publications ==
JRSS.	Sammel, Mary Dupuis; Ryan, Louise M.; Legler, Julie M. (August 1997), "Latent variable models for mixed discrete and continuous outcomes", Journal of the Royal Statistical Society, Series B, 59 (3): 667–678, doi:10.1111/1467-9868.00090, S2CID 122691867

JAMA.	Strom, Brian L.; Schinnar, Rita; Ziegler, Ekhard E.; Barnhart, Kurt T.; Sammel, Mary D.; Macones, George A.; Stallings, Virginia A.; Drulis, Jean M.; Nelson, Steven E.; Hanson, Sandra A. (August 2001), "Exposure to soy-based formula in infancy and endocrinological and reproductive outcomes in young adulthood", JAMA, 286 (7): 807–14, Bibcode:2001JAMA..286..807S, doi:10.1001/jama.286.7.807, PMID 11497534

OG.	Barnhart, Kurt T.; Gosman, Gabriella; Ashby, Rachel; Sammel, Mary (April 2003), "The medical management of ectopic pregnancy: a meta-analysis comparing "single dose" and "multidose" regimens", Obstetrics & Gynecology, 101 (4): 778–784, doi:10.1016/s0029-7844(02)03158-7, PMID 12681886, S2CID 32674269

AGP.	Freeman, Ellen W.; Sammel, Mary D.; Lin, Hui; Nelson, Deborah B. (April 2006), "Associations of hormones and menopausal status with depressed mood in women with no history of depression", Archives of General Psychiatry, 63 (4): 375–82, doi:10.1001/archpsyc.63.4.375, PMID 16585466

PNAS.	Bray, Emily E.; Sammel, Mary D.; Cheney, Dorothy L.; Serpell, James A.; Seyfarth, Robert M. (August 2017), "Effects of maternal investment, temperament, and cognition on guide dog success", Proceedings of the National Academy of Sciences, 114 (34): 9128–9133, Bibcode:2017PNAS..114.9128B, doi:10.1073/pnas.1704303114, PMC 5576795, PMID 28784785
