= Město Touškov =

Town in Plzeň Region, Czech Republic

- Town
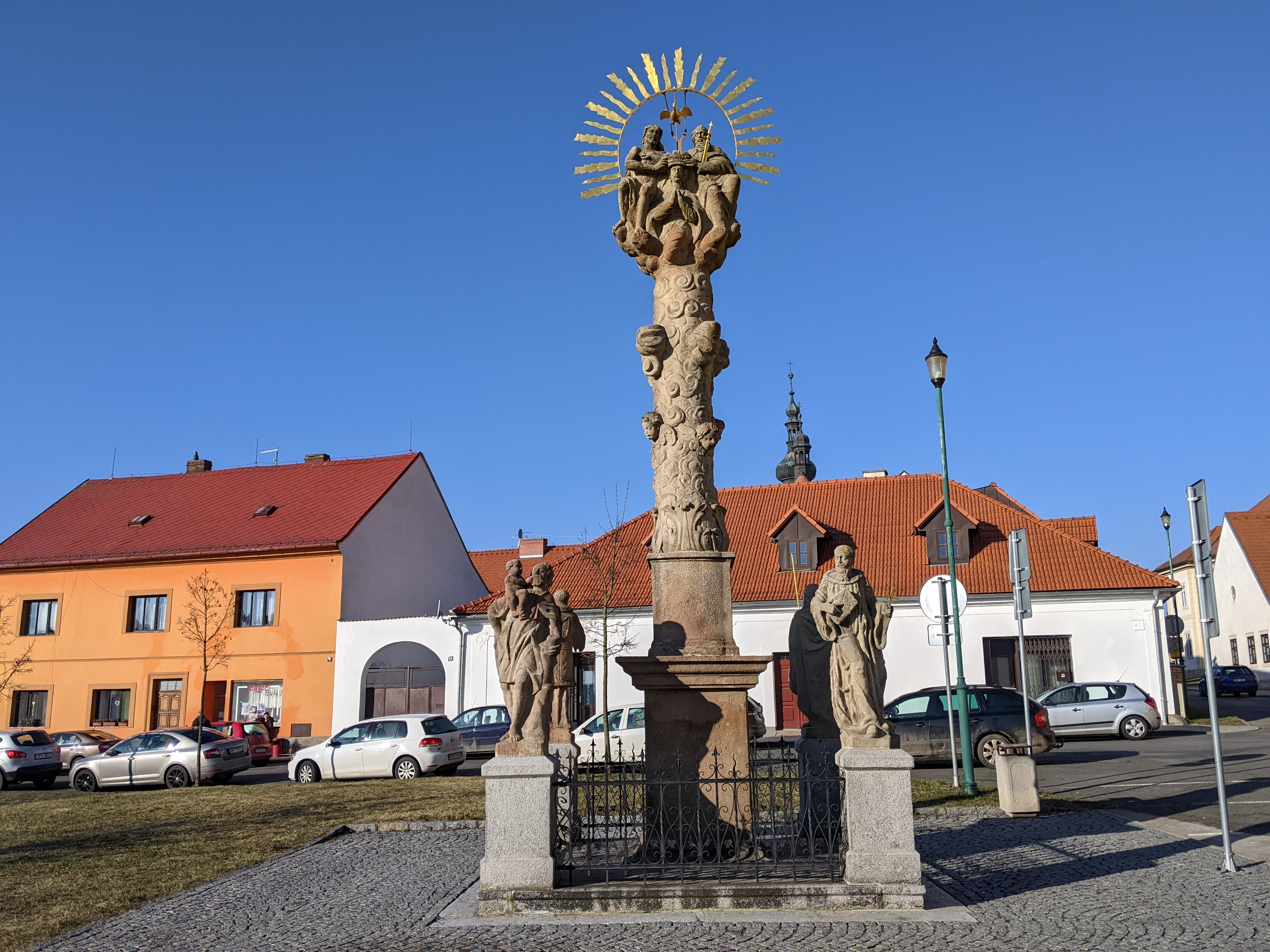
- Holy Trinity Column at the town square

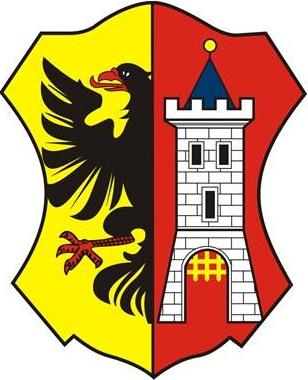
- Flag Coat of arms

- Location in the Czech Republic
- Coordinates: 49°46′34″N 13°15′4″E
- Country: Czech Republic
- Region: Plzeň
- District: Plzeň-North
- First mentioned: 1115

Government
  - Mayor: Kateřina Duchková

Area
  - Total: 9.63 km^{2} (3.72 sq mi)
- Elevation: 333 m (1,093 ft)

Population (2026-01-01)
  - Total: 2,495
  - Density: 259/km^{2} (671/sq mi)
- Time zone: UTC+1 (CET)
  - Summer (DST): UTC+2 (CEST)
- Postal code: 330 33
- Website: www.touskov.cz

Město Touškov (Czech pronunciation: [ˈmɲɛsto ˈtouʃkof]; German: Tuschkau Stadt) is a town in Plzeň-North District in the Plzeň Region of the Czech Republic. It has about 2,500 inhabitants. The town is located on the Mže River in the Plasy Uplands.

The historic town centre is well preserved and is protected as an urban monument zone. The main landmark of Město Touškov is the Church of Saint John the Baptist.

== Administrative division ==
Město Touškov consists of two municipal parts (in brackets population according to the 2021 census):

- Město Touškov (2,085)
- Kůští (53)

Kůští forms an exclave of the municipal territory.

== Etymology ==
The name Touškov (in Old Czech written as Túškov) is derived from the personal name Toušek/Túšek, meaning "Toušek's (court)". To distinguish it from the nearby settlement of the same name (today known as Ves Touškov, 'the village of Touškov'), it was called Bílý Touškov ('white Touškov') in the 19th century, and from 1900 it has been known as Město Touškov ('the town of Touškov').

== Geography ==
Město Touškov is located about 9 kilometres (6 mi) northwest of Plzeň. It lies in the Plasy Uplands. The highest point is at 453 m (1,486 ft) above sea level. The town is situated on the left bank of the Mže River.

== History ==
The first written mention of Touškov is in a deed of the monastery in Kladruby from 1115. In 1238, it was referred to as a market town. From 1288, it was referred to as a town. During the Hussite Wars, Touškov was destroyed by the army of Jan Žižka and became a village again, but it recovered and from 1472 it was called a market town again. At the turn of the 14th and 15th centuries, Touškov acquired an urban character. The Gothic cores of houses from this time have been preserved to this day.

In 1543, Touškov was officially promoted to a market town by Emperor Ferdinand I. After the devastation of Touškov during the Thirty Years' War, settlers from Germany were invited to the market town, and a German majority gradually emerged. In the mid-17th century, the Jewish community of 25 people was documented. Two large fires devastated Touškov in 1659 and 1672 and three small fires in 1683, 1688 and 1724, but the market town continued to develop. In the second half of the 19th century, Touškov became a town.

From 1938 to 1945, Město Touškov was annexed by Nazi Germany and administered as part of the Reichsgau Sudetenland. All the Jews and most of the Czechs left the town. After World War II, the Germans were expelled and the town was resettled by Czechs.

== Demographics ==
Historical population

Year	Pop.	±%
1869	1,388	—
1880	1,490	+7.3%
1890	1,608	+7.9%
1900	1,491	−7.3%
1910	1,541	+3.4%

Year	Pop.	±%
1921	1,610	+4.5%
1930	2,061	+28.0%
1950	1,473	−28.5%
1961	1,672	+13.5%
1970	1,495	−10.6%

Year	Pop.	±%
1980	1,657	+10.8%
1991	1,641	−1.0%
2001	1,712	+4.3%
2011	2,077	+21.3%
2021	2,138	+2.9%

Source: Censuses

== Transport ==
The I/20 road from Plzeň to Karlovy Vary (part of the European route E49) runs along the northern municipal border.

== Sights ==
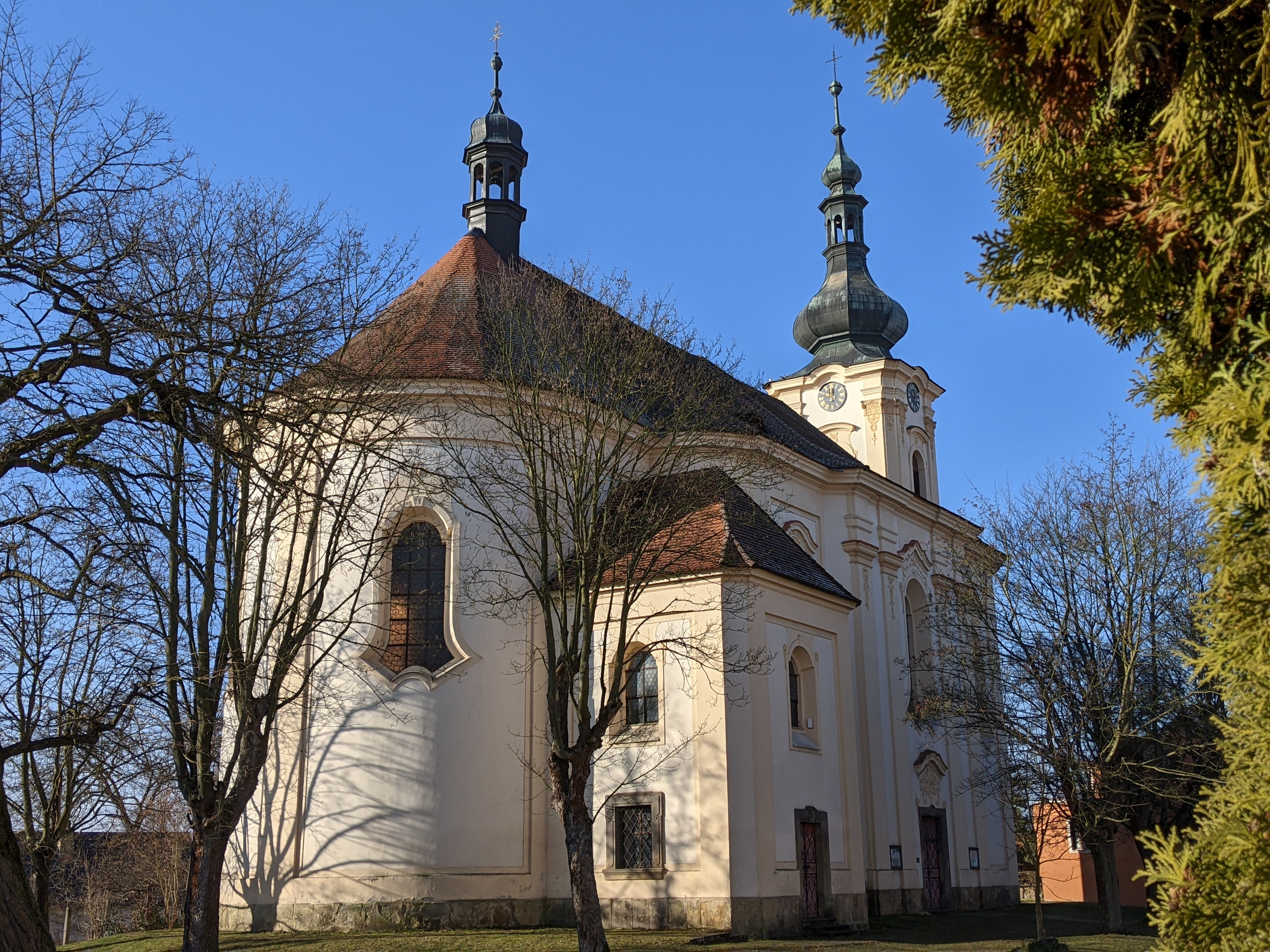
Church of Saint John the Baptist

The most important monument is the Church of Saint John the Baptist. It was built in the Baroque style in 1778–1780.

The main landmark of the square Dolní náměstí is the Holy Trinity Column. It dates from 1723.

== Notable people ==
- Simon von Lämel (1766–1845), Austrian-Jewish merchant
