= Ves Touškov =

- Municipality
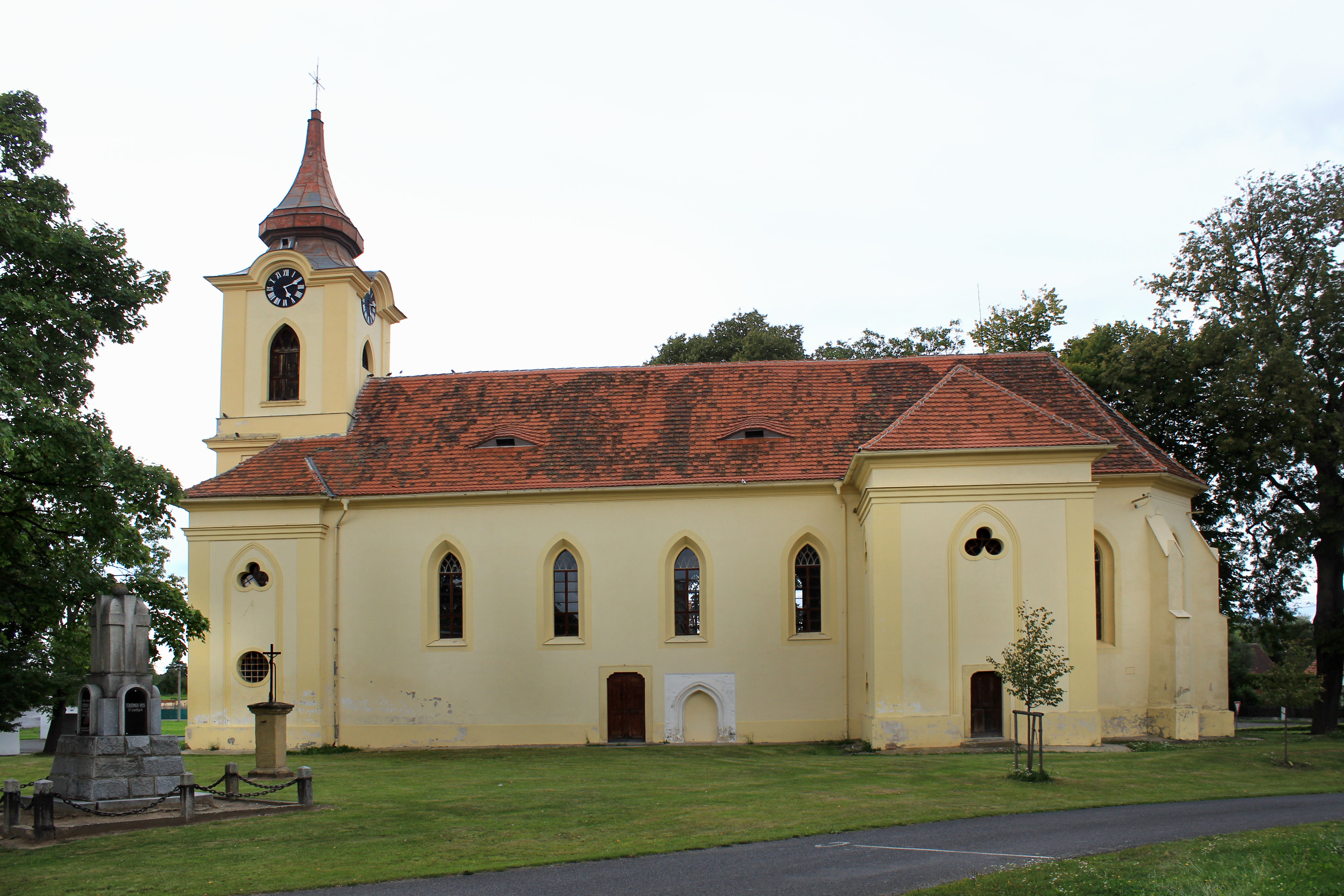
- Church of Saint Margaret

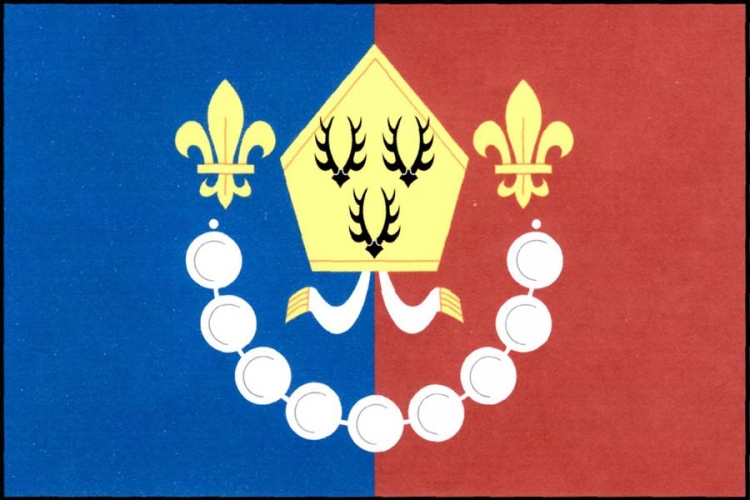
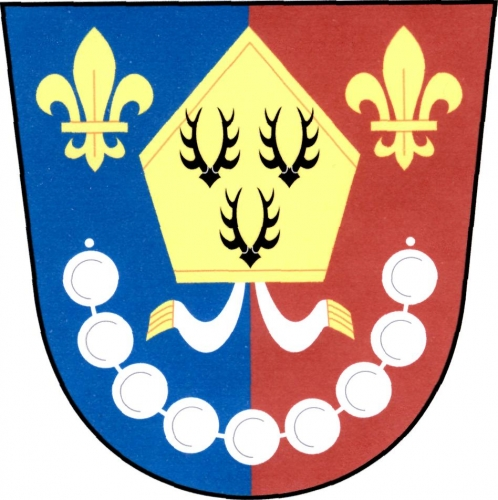
- Flag Coat of arms

- Location in the Czech Republic
- Coordinates: 49°39′42″N 13°7′9″E
- Country: Czech Republic
- Region: Plzeň
- District: Plzeň-South
- First mentioned: 1243

Area
  - Total: 11.85 km^{2} (4.58 sq mi)
- Elevation: 336 m (1,102 ft)

Population (2026-01-01)
  - Total: 332
  - Density: 28.0/km^{2} (72.6/sq mi)
- Time zone: UTC+1 (CET)
  - Summer (DST): UTC+2 (CEST)
- Postal code: 333 01
- Website: www.ves-touskov.cz

Ves Touškov (German: Tuschkau Dorf) is a municipality and village in Plzeň-South District in the Plzeň Region of the Czech Republic. It has about 300 inhabitants.

== Administrative division ==
Ves Touškov consists of two municipal parts (in brackets population according to the 2021 census):

- Ves Touškov (288)
- Mířovice (41)

== Etymology ==
The name Touškov (in Old Czech written as Túškov) is derived from the personal name Toušek/Túšek, meaning "Toušek's (court)". To distinguish it from the nearby town of the same name (today known as Město Touškov, 'the town of Touškov'), it was renamed Ves Touškov ('the village of Touškov') in 1900.

== Geography ==
Ves Touškov is located about 19 kilometres (12 mi) southwest of Plzeň. It lies in the Plasy Uplands. The highest point is at 432 m (1,417 ft) above sea level. The stream Touškovský potok flows through the municipality.

== History ==
The first written mention of Ves Touškov is from 1243. From 1290, it was owned by the Chotěšov Abbey.

== Demographics ==
Historical population

Year	Pop.	±%
1869	575	—
1880	646	+12.3%
1890	660	+2.2%
1900	682	+3.3%
1910	743	+8.9%

Year	Pop.	±%
1921	755	+1.6%
1930	738	−2.3%
1950	481	−34.8%
1961	430	−10.6%
1970	363	−15.6%

Year	Pop.	±%
1980	325	−10.5%
1991	318	−2.2%
2001	330	+3.8%
2011	313	−5.2%
2021	329	+5.1%

Source: Censuses

== Transport ==
There are no railways or major roads passing through the municipality.

== Sights ==
The main landmark of Ves Touškov is the Church of Saint Margaret. It was built in the Gothic style in the second half of the 14th century. In 1846, it was rebuilt in the neo-Gothic style.
