= Lemmel =

Lemmel is a surname. Notable people with the surname include:

- Katerina Lemmel (1466–1533), a successful German businesswoman from a powerful Nuremberg family
- Manuel Lemmel (1894–unknown), Spanish footballer
- Pablo Lemmel (1892–1982), Spanish footballer and brother of the above

== See also ==
- Lemel
