= Yisroel Yaakov Fisher =

Rabbi Yisroel Yaakov Fisher
- ישראל יעקב פישר
- Born: July 9, 1928 (21 Tammuz 5688 Anno Mundi); Jerusalem, Mandate of Palestine
- Died: February 28, 2003 (aged 74) (25 Adar I 5663 Anno Mundi); Jerusalem
- Resting place: Har HaMenuchot
- Occupation: Rabbi
- Children: Aharon; Yehuda; Moshe
- Relatives: Moshe Braverman (son in law); Y. Rotman (son in law)

Yisroel Yaakov Fisher (Hebrew: ישראל יעקב פישר; 1928–2003), was a leading posek, Av Beit Din of the Edah HaChareidis, and rabbi of the Zichron Moshe neighbourhood in Jerusalem.

He was born in Jerusalem in 1928 to Rabbi Aharon Fisher, a prominent member of the Perushim community. He was named after the political activist Jacob Israël de Haan who had been assassinated four years earlier. As a teenager, he studied in the Etz Chaim Yeshiva and became a close student of Rabbi Isser Zalman Meltzer. He was later married to the daughter of Rabbi Zelig Wallis and they settled in Batei Horodno area of Jerusalem.

In 1961, he was appointed as a moreh tzedek and two years later, in 1963, he was invited to serve as rabbi of the Great Synagogue of Zikhron Moshe. In 1974, he was made a member of the Badatz of the Edah HaChareidis. In 1996, he was appointed Av Beit Din of the Edah HaChareidis.

He died in 2003 and is buried on Har HaMenuchot.

== Works ==
- Even Yisroel — several volumes of responsa

== Sources ==
- HaRav Yisroel Yaakov Fisher, by Betzalel Kahn (Dei'ah veDibur)
