= Edison Theater (Jerusalem) =

Coordinates: 31.78627°N 35.21795°E

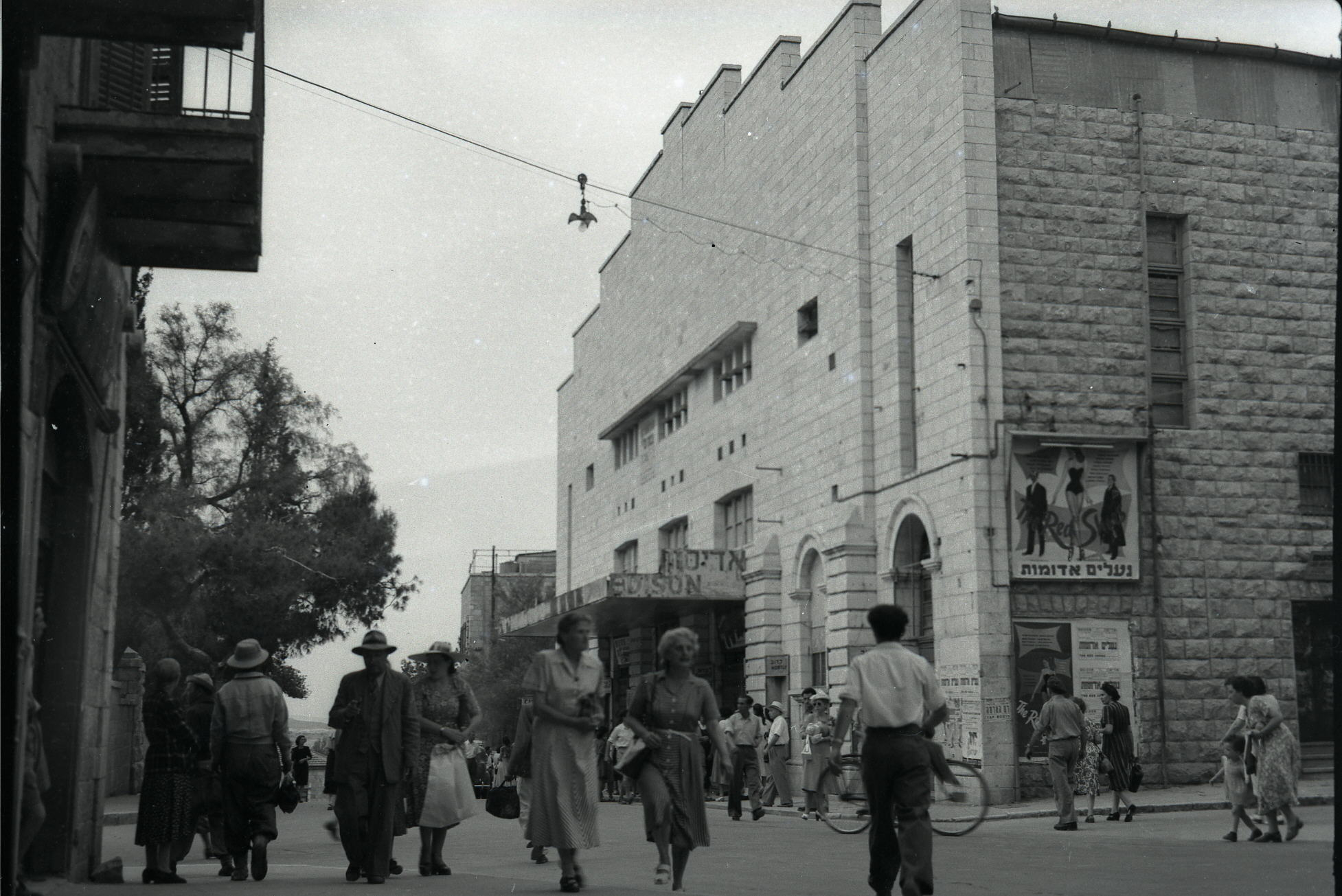
Edison Theater, 1950, Benno Rothenberg, Meitar Collection, National Library of Israel

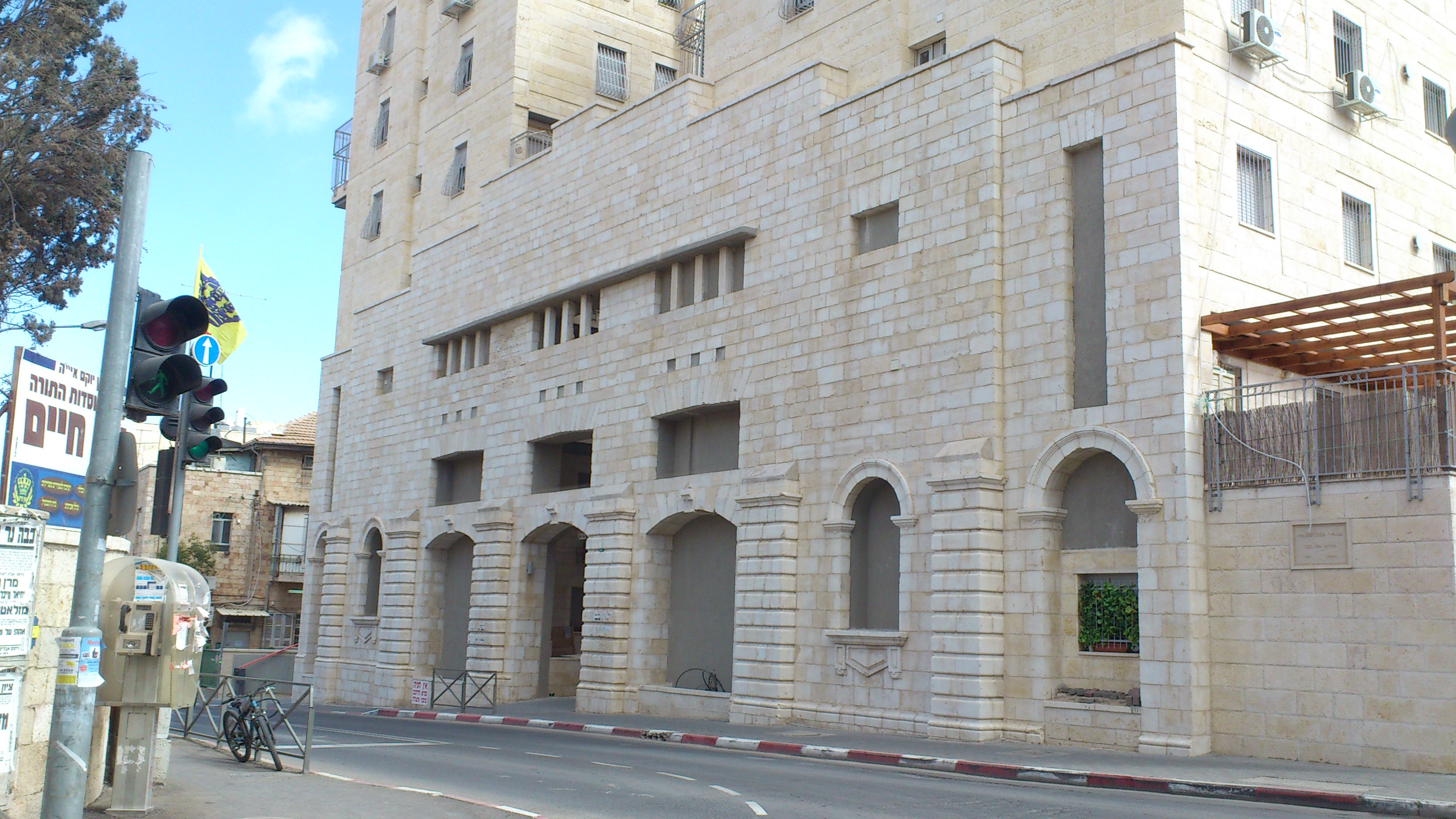
Reconstructed facade of the Edison Theater, now the site of a housing complex

Edison Theater was a movie theater, cultural center and concert venue in the Zichron Moshe neighborhood of Jerusalem. The theater opened in 1932 and closed down in 1995.

== History ==
Edison Theater was the third movie theater built in Jerusalem. It was noted for its modern architecture and spaciousness. It could seat 1,500 people. It was also the city's first public auditorium with air conditioning. It was named for Thomas Edison, inventor of the motion picture.

In addition to movies, many world-renowned artists performed there, including Yves Montand. It served as the concert venue for the Palestine Symphony Orchestra, renamed the Israel Philharmonic Orchestra in 1948.

The theater's location on the seamline between religious and secular Jewish neighborhoods in Jerusalem led to friction over the years. In 1931, the theater signed an "anti-Shabbat-violation" agreement together with the city's two other theaters. Violating the agreement would incur a fine of 300 Palestinian liras. Later ticket sales commenced before the end of Shabbat, even though the screenings themselves were after Shabbat. The Haredi community, led by Amram Blau of Neturei Karta, tried to stop this practice, and the theater was severely damaged in two arson attacks (in 1965 and 1975).

On May 16, 1936, a terror attack on Jerusalem's Edison cinema left three Jews dead and two injured, after an assailant fired five shots into the crowd as they were leaving the theater. The shooting was one of a series of attacks carried out between 1936 and 1939, as part of the Arab revolt in Palestine, against British colonial rule and Jewish immigration.

The theater closed in 1995 and was abandoned for a number of years. In 2006, the site was sold to a group of Satmar Hasidim, spearheaded by two American businessmen, Benzion Wertzberger and Yitzchok Rosenberg. A 64-unit housing complex on the site was completed in February 2014.

== See also ==
- Cinema of Israel
- Culture of Israel
- Architecture of Israel
