= Simon von Lämel =

Austrian Jewish merchant (1766-1845)

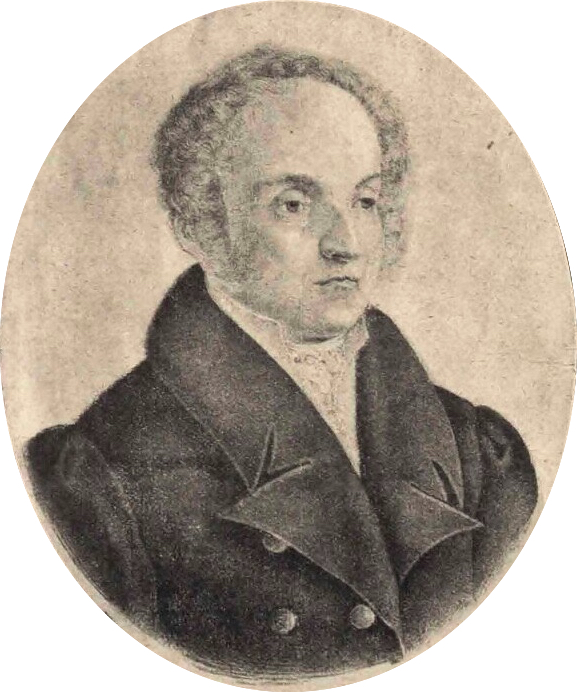
- Simon von Lämel
- Born: August 1766; Tuschkau, Kingdom of Bohemia, Holy Roman Empire
- Died: 18 April 1845 (aged 78); Vienna, Austrian Empire
- Spouse: Babette Duschenes
- Children: Elise Herz; Leopold von Lämel

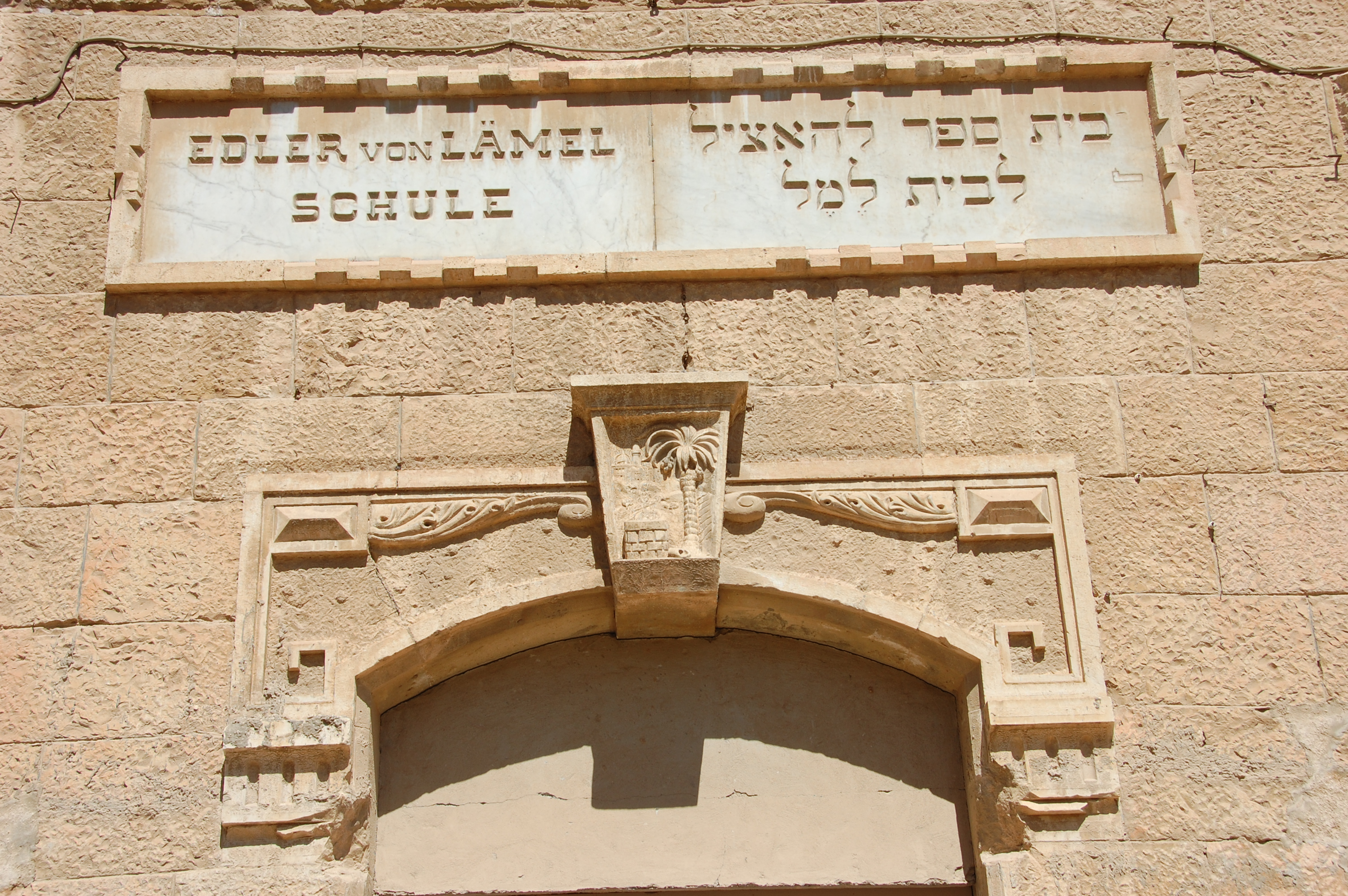
Inscription on the facade of the Edler von Lämel Schule (Lämel School) in Jerusalem

Simon Edler von Lämel (August 1766 – 18 April 1845) was an Austrian-Jewish merchant who devoted his life to bettering the lives of his fellow Jews.

== Biography ==
He was born in Tuschkau (now Město Touškov), near Plzeň, Bohemia. His father died early on, so Lämel quickly developed an interest in the mercantile business. By the age of twenty-one, he had his own wholesale warehouse in Prague. This soon became one of the nation's most important.

Lämel was a great supporter of reforms. He encouraged improvements in sheep raising, and created new ways to card and manufacture their wool.

During the Napoleonic Wars, he sought to help Austria in any way he could. He bought all the supplies from magazines captured by the French, and later all the captured artillery pieces as well. In all, he saved the empire over 3,000,000 florins. In 1809, he bought 450 tons of biscuits for the troops, declining any profits or commissions. On top of that, he loaned the government considerable sums of money, which culminated in 1809, with his lending the state his entire fortune to speed the withdrawal of French troops from Vienna.

As a result of his actions for his country, he asked to be allowed to buy a house in Vienna, but in March 1811 the emperor refused his permission. Later that year, however, Lämel was elevated to the hereditary nobility, which gave both him and his children the right to live in Vienna—where Jews were barely tolerated. In 1813, he was appointed commissary of the army by Field Marshal Karl Philipp, Prince of Schwarzenberg, which released him from having to quarter soldiers.

Besides Austria, Saxony also benefited from Lämel's services. Several letters from the kings there describe their respect for him. His work was one of the causes of the end to the body-tax (Leibzoll) in that kingdom.

His entire life, Lämel always tried to raise the living-conditions of his fellow Jews. In 1817, he succeeded in getting the Bohemian Jews' taxes reduced, and was told they would soon be completely abolished. Even so, he never tried to escape the taxation himself, even after he moved to Vienna. Shortly before his death, he tried to get the medieval Jewish oath abolished.

Lämel's daughter, Elise Herz, founded a school in the Zikhron Moshe neighborhood of Jerusalem in his memory, the Lämel School, supported by a foundation ('Stiftung'), the Simon Edler von Lämel Stiftung.
