= Laemmle =

Laemmle is a surname, shared largely by a family of filmmakers. Notable people with the surname include:

- Carl Laemmle (1867–1939), German-American film producer
- Carl Laemmle Jr. (1908–1979), American film producer
- Carla Laemmle (1909–2014), American dancer and actress
- Ernst Laemmle (1900–1950), German film director
- Edward Laemmle (1887–1937), American film director

== See also ==
- Laemmle Building, a former building in Hollywood, California, U.S.
- Laemmle Theatres in Los Angeles, California, U.S.
