= Julie Legler =

American biostatistician and statistics educator

Julie M. Legler is an American biostatistician and statistics educator. She is a professor of statistics at St. Olaf College.

Legler did her undergraduate studies at the University of Minnesota, and continued there for a master's degree. As a doctoral student in biostatistics at Harvard University, she became one of the early recipients of the Gertrude Cox Scholarship of the American Statistical Association's Committee on Women in Statistics. Her 1993 dissertation, supervised by Louise M. Ryan, was Statistical Analysis for Multiple Binary Outcomes: The Analysis of Birth Defects Data.

After working for seven years in the National Cancer Institute at the National Institutes of Health, she moved to St. Olaf, a small liberal arts college that attracted her with its enthusiastic students and low-pressure atmosphere. At St. Olaf, she has directed the statistics program and headed the Center for Interdisciplinary Research, a program that finds projects in other disciplines to which statistics students can contribute. She has also directed the St. Olaf program for Collaborative Undergraduate Research and Inquiry. Legler chaired the Joint Committee on Undergraduate Statistics of the American Statistical Association and Mathematical Association of America in 2009.

She is one of eight co-authors of the textbook STAT2: Building Models for a World of Data (Macmillan, 2013).

In 2013, Legler was elected as a Fellow of the American Statistical Association.
