= Lämel School =

Jewish school in Jerusalem

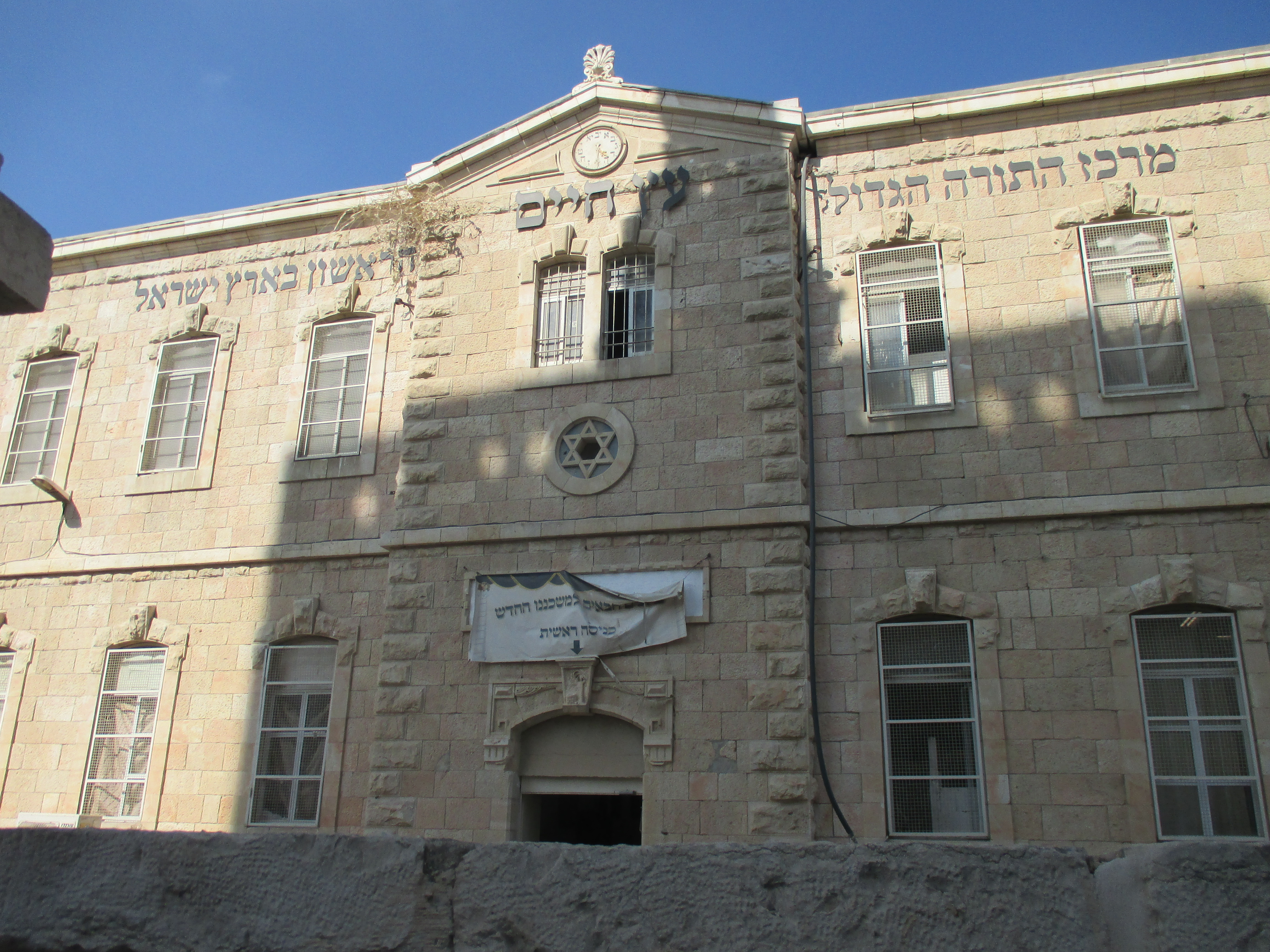

Location
- Zikhron Moshe; Jerusalem, Israel
- 31°47′11″N 35°13′03″E

Information
- Religious affiliation: Boyaner Hasidic Judaism
- Established: 1856
- Status: Private

The Lämel School (Hebrew: בית הספר למל; also the Von Lamel School; often misspelled Lemel School) is a school established in Jerusalem in 1856 by the Austrian family of Simon von Lämel to educate members of the Old Yishuv in the city. It was initially established in the Jewish Quarter of the Old City, but moved to a permanent building in Zikhron Moshe in 1903.

== History ==
The Lämel family is a well-known philanthropic family that supported many educational institutions, with the Lämel School specifically being established in Lämel's memory, as he passed in 1845. The establishment of the school was headed by Ludwig August von Frankl, who faced opposition from many members of the Ashkenazi Old Yishuv upon his arrival in Jerusalem. They feared that his new school would bring lawlessness due to its emphasis on many secular studies, having seen Jerusalem previously as a way of escaping the European Age of Enlightenment. A rabbinical boycott of the school occurred, and Frankl eventually signed a deal with the Sephardic community where he would have his curriculum approved by them. One such signatory was Eliyahu Yaakov Nissim.

In 1888, the school was merged with the Herzberg Orphanage in a transition facilitated by Ephraim Cohen-Reiss. The reorganization included adding new teachers to the staff, such as David Yellin, and developing a scholastic methodology along with more time towards secular studies. Since then, the school recovered and saw an increase in attendance, including those from the Ashkenazi Jewish community.

A new building was constructed in the 1900s for the community, which was funded by a 50,000 Franc donation by the Jewish Colonization Association in 1901. In 1904, the school came under the control of the Aid Association of German Jews, also known as "Ezra". From 1905 to 1907, Joseph Carlebach, later chief rabbi of Hamburg and Altona, taught mathematics and the natural sciences at the school.

In 1913, during the War of the Languages, the school remained loyal to Ezra, resulting in many teachers resigning and establishing a competing school. Many students went on strike and did not come to school, demanding the return of the teachers, but following the transition of occupation of the land from the Ottoman Empire to the British Mandate for Palestine, the school fell under jurisdiction of a Zionist organization. The school was administered by Chaim Aryeh Zuta, and by 1930, it was the largest of public schools in Jerusalem and had 550 students.

In 1967, the Ministry of Education decided to close the evening classes for secondary students after it was decided that its teachers would receive a salary as secondary teachers, rather than public school teachers.

Records exist for students who attended the school between 1912 and 1913. It was originally microfilmed by the Jerusalem Municipal Archives in 1982, and also exists at the Family History Library. It has since been digitized by the Israel Genealogy Research Association.

== Curriculum ==
The school was originally planned to serve as a shelter for poor and orphaned children, providing necessities to the needy youth while simultaneously educating them. The place had a traditional character and the daily schedule included Biblical studies and a Jewish education, as well as arithmetic and writing. The initial language of instruction was Judaeo-Spanish, and it was switched to German and French in the 1880s, which were more common languages used in academia. This was challenged in the 1900s for a certain period during a fight over languages, as Ephraim Cohen insisted the secular studies be taught in German despite heavy opposition.

== Building ==
The original location of the 1856 school was located on Chain Street in the Old City. The school moved in 1903 upon construction at Zikhron Moshe on Yesheyahu Street, although the building was only under construction in 1902. The building was designed by Templar architect Theodor Sandel, who also designed the German Hospital on HaNeviim Street and Old Shaare Zedek Building. The construction was undertaken by contractor Jacob Mann (born 1849), who also worked with Zendal on Shaare Zedek. Zendel died partway through construction, and his son Benjamin took oversight over the rest of the project. The building was built in a European Neoclassical style while combining local design elements.

In addition to its use as a school, the building served the local community by holding many local events and Scout activities. In January 1945, the British Mandate government expropriated rooms by stationing British Army soldiers in them.

In the years following the school's closure, the building was used as a Talmud Torah by Boyan Hasidim due to its proximity to the ultra-Orthodox neighborhoods in the city. In March 2011, the Histadrut sold the building to Etz Chaim Yeshiva. In December 2014, a plan was proposed for the construction of two residential buildings in the building's courtyard with a promise to preserve the original school building.
