= Zikhron Moshe =

Haredi Jewish neighborhood in central Jerusalem

Coordinates: 31.787391°N 35.216669°E

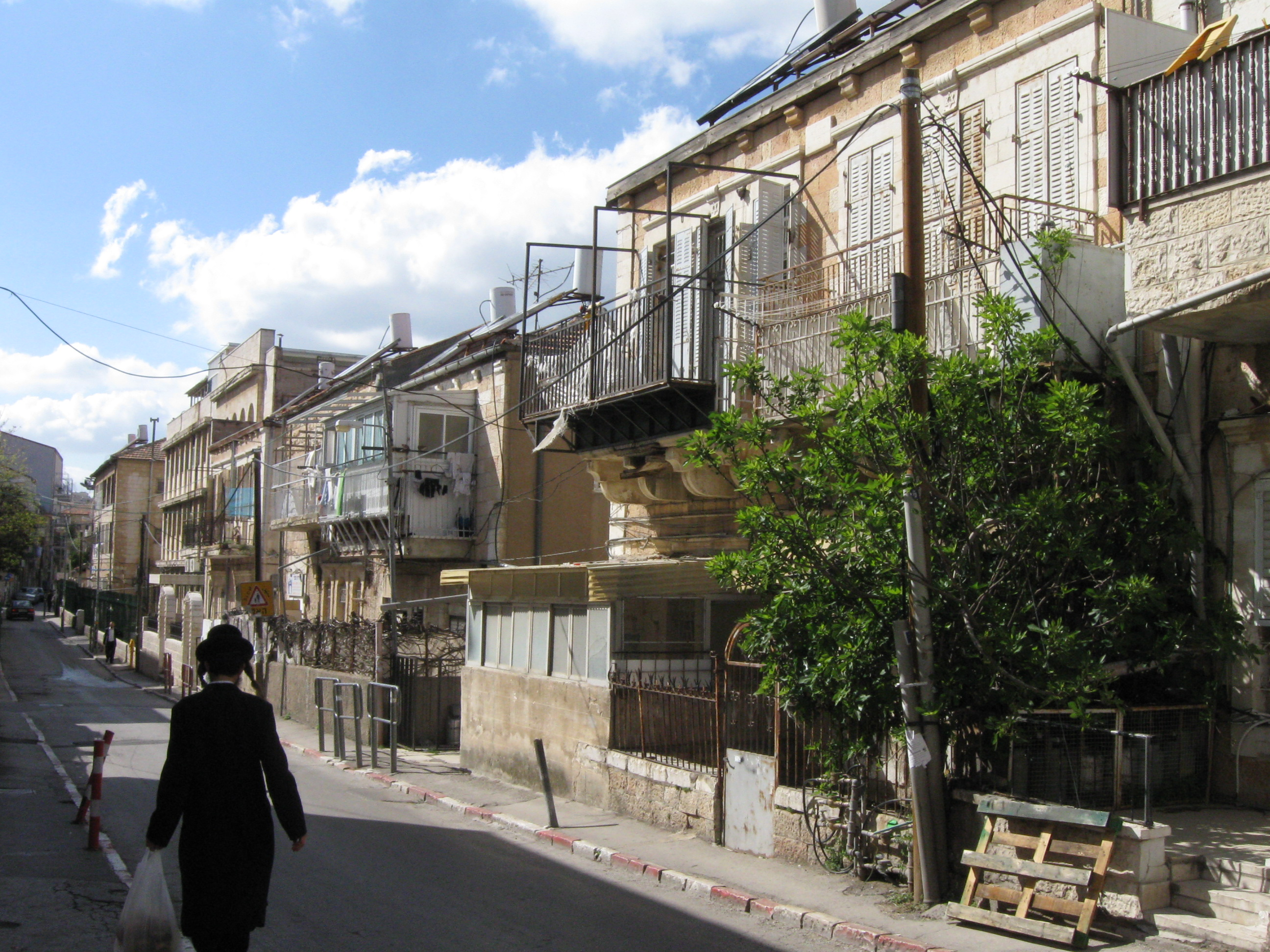
A street in Zikhron Moshe.

Zikhron Moshe (Hebrew: זיכרון משה, lit. Memorial for Moses) is a Haredi neighborhood in central Jerusalem. The neighborhood is bordered by Geula to the north, Mekor Baruch to the west, David Yellin Street to the south, and Mea Shearim to the east.

== History ==
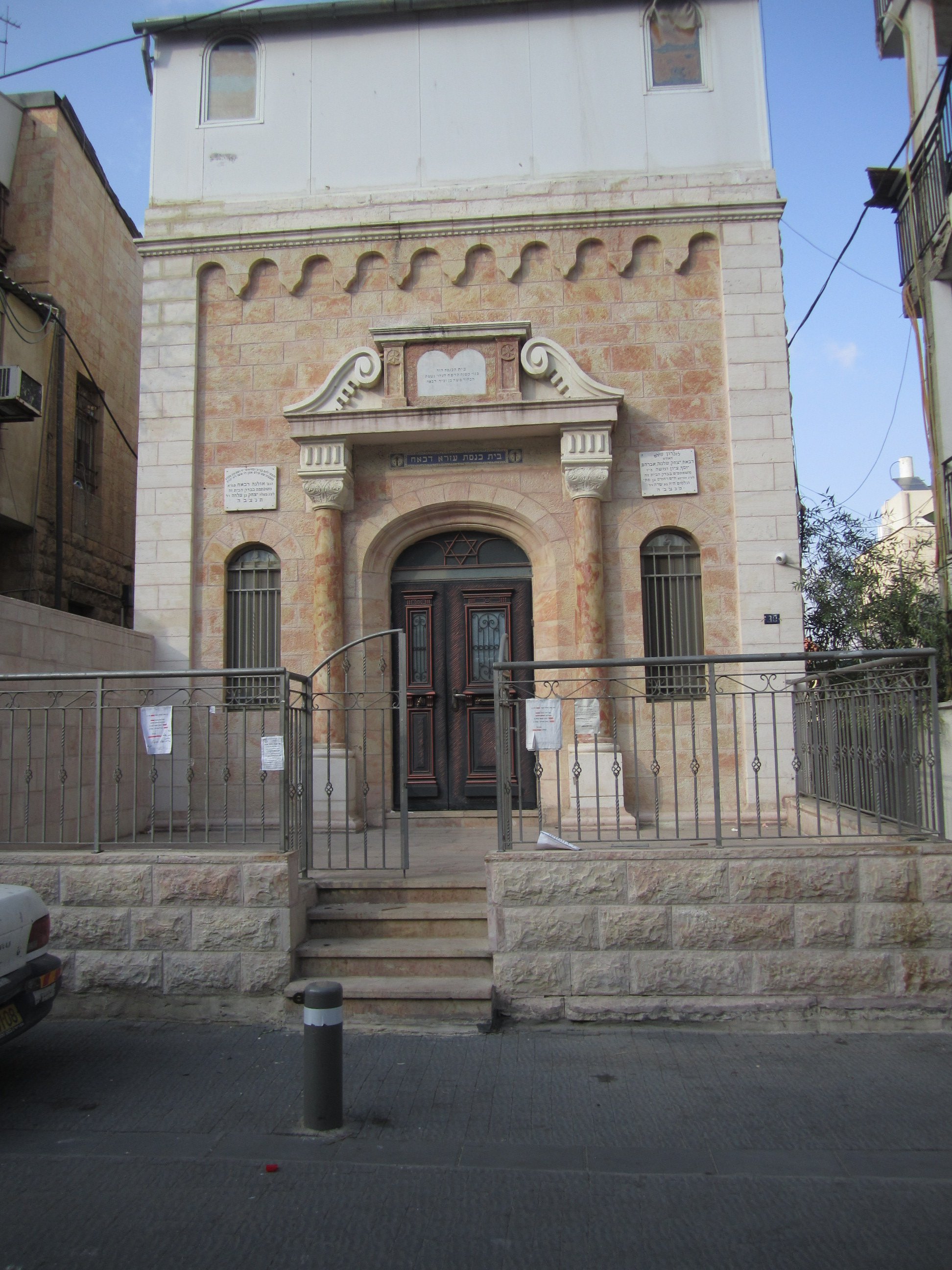
Ezra Dabah synagogue in the neighborhood

Founded in 1905, its first inhabitants were secular teachers. It was one of several neighborhoods in Jerusalem named for Sir Moses Montefiore. In 1924, Hebrew writer S.Y. Agnon moved there after a fire burned down his house and library in Bad Homburg.

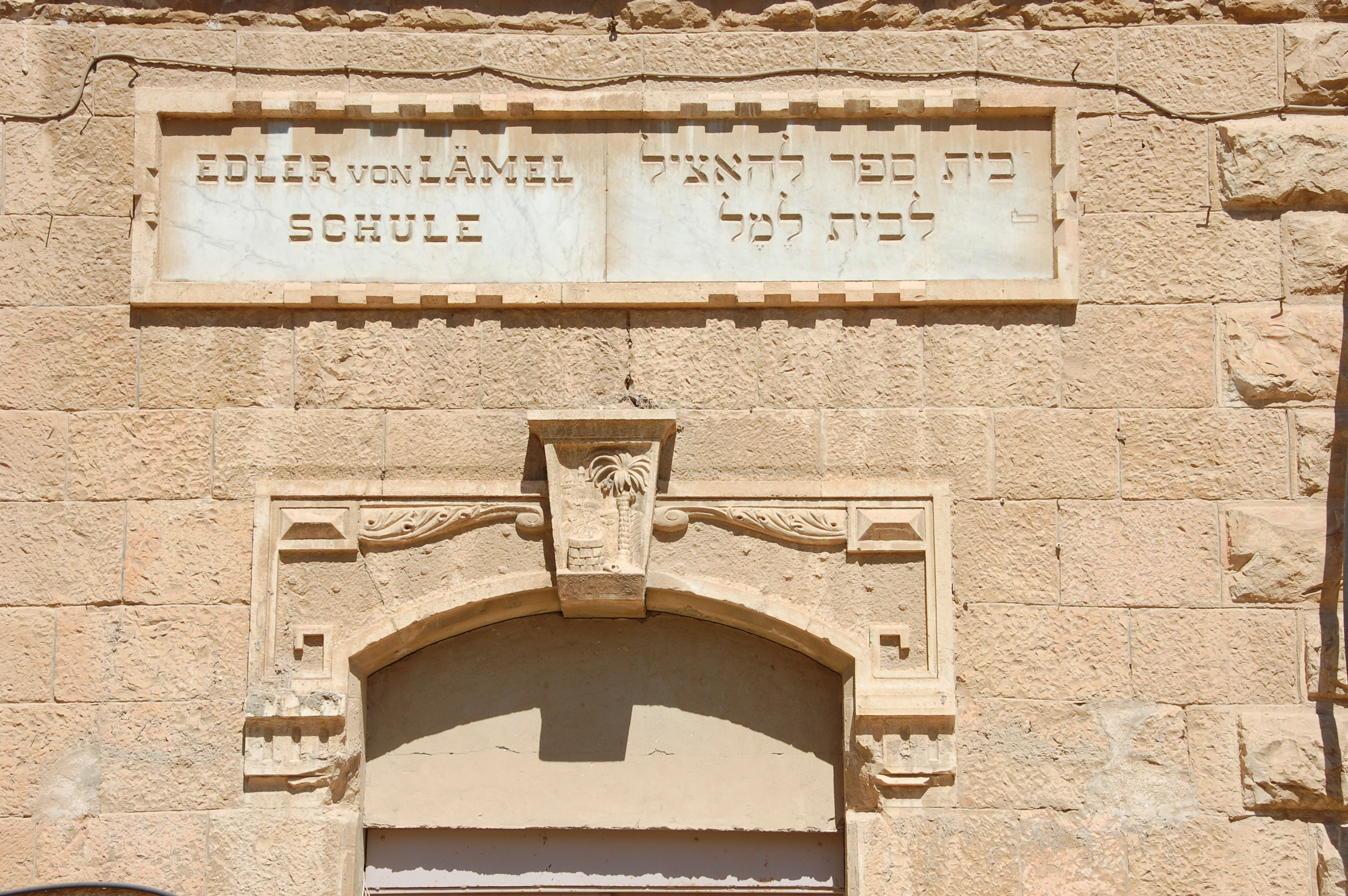
Historic lintel of Lamel School

The neighborhood grew up around the Simon von Lämel school, Jerusalem's third Jewish school. It was built in 1856 with funds donated by Elise Herz Lamel of Vienna, Austria in memory of her father. In 1888, management of the school was transferred to a German-Jewish philanthropic society, and in 1910, to the Hilfsverein der Deutschen Juden, a German-Jewish relief association established in 1901.

In 1932, the Edison Theater was built on a vacant lot in Zikhron Moshe that later became Yeshayahu Street. It was named for Thomas Edison, who invented the first movie projector. The theater was the first its kind in Jerusalem. Yves Montand and other acclaimed performers appeared there, and it was the venue for concerts of the pre-state Philharmonic Orchestra.

== Later development ==
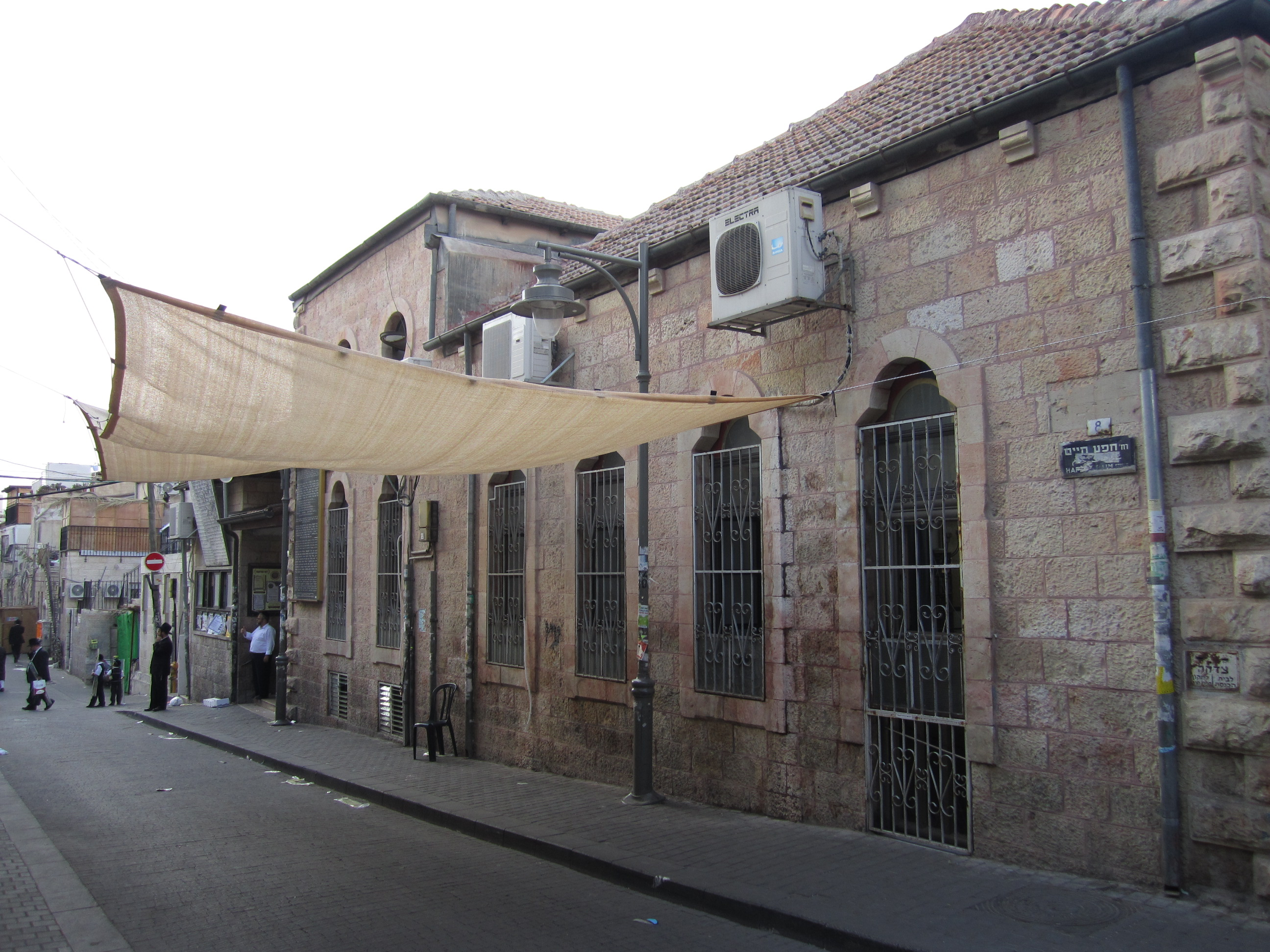
The front of the Zichron Moshe Shtiebelach, a synagogue with many minyanim at all times of day.

Throughout the years, the neighborhood became increasingly religious and is now the southernmost part of the main Haredi part of the city, adjacent to Geula, which is the commercial heart of the Haredi city section.

== Rabbis ==
The neighborhood rabbis were:

- 1963-2003: Rabbi Yisroel Yaakov Fisher (1928-2003)
- 2003-2025: Rabbi Aharon Fisher (son of Yisroel Yaakov, d. 2025)
- 2025-present: Rabbi Yehuda Fisher (son of Aharon)
