= Fantastic Return to Oz =

- Theatrical release poster
- Directed by: Fyodor Dmitriev
- Written by: Aleksandr Boyarsky
- Based on: Urfin Jus and His Wooden Soldiers by Alexander Volkov
- Produced by: Aleksandr Boyarsky; Sergey Selyanov
- Starring: Konstantin Khabensky; Ekaterina Gorokhovskaya; Alexander Bykovsky; Dmitri Dyuzhev; Andrey Levin; Yulia Rudina; Maxim Sergeev
- Cinematography: Viktor Loschilov
- Edited by: Sergei Glezin
- Music by: Mikhail Chertishchev
- Production companies: Melnitsa Animation Studio; CTB Film Company
- Distributed by: Nashe Kino
- Release date: 24 October 2019
- Running time: 74 minutes
- Country: Russia
- Language: Russian
- Budget: ₽300 million
- Box office: $1.5 million

Fantastic Return to Oz (Russian: Урфин Джюс возвращается, romanized: Urfin Dzhyus vozvrashchaetsya, transl. Urfin Jus is back) is a 2019 Russian animated film that serves as a sequel to Fantastic Journey to Oz and is based on the novel Urfin Jus and his Wooden Soldiers by Alexander Volkov.

The film was released in Russia on 24 October 2019.

== Plot ==
One year after Urfin Jus' defeat, (Note: As depicted in Fantastic Journey to Oz (2017)) he plans to steal Gingema's book again. At the Emerald City, the citizens are presented a giant robot resembling Ellie in her honor. (Note: Named Dorothy in the English dub.) The bear and wooden puppet clown, Urfin's henchmen, sneak in and steal the book with Ruf Bilan's help. Meanwhile, Ellie, her dog Toto, and Tim, a boy, use the silver slippers to teleport themselves and are separated; Tim lands at Urfin Jus' cave hideout where he is presenting the book to his carraci. Meanwhile, Ellie and Toto end up at the ogre's house. The ogre later finds a crow, and reveals that she will tell everyone that they his prisoner.

Urfin has one of his henchmen, the wooden puppet, to steal the silver slippers from Tim. The book leads Tim to a swamp, and the former tricks the latter into being allowed to returning home there. Urfin jumps in, finding himself in a dark world, the book's home. There, he is received a pair of pink glasses that allows him to see a different version of the world. He enters a palace, where he meets the book's true form, a princess, who offers Urfin an army. Meanwhile, Urfin's carraci captures Tim and set out to take him to Ellie under the crows order. He manages to escape, and, while fleeing, he meets two saber toothed tigers. His phone's app, depicting a blue rabbit, tells the saber toothed tigers about the ogres kidnapping of Ellie, and the two help Tim to find her. Meanwhile, the Scarecrow, the Woodman, and Cowardly Lion reconciles with Ellie, while the carraci returns with the basket but find that Tim is missing. The team takes hot air balloons to find him.

Tim meets a talking squirrel, in who she takes him to mouse Queen Ramina. Ramina persuades Tim into returning home with an whistle, but he realizes that he can't leave without Ellie. Suddenly, he and the carraci are ambushed by Urfin's monster army. In the chaos, Ellie and her team retreat, but their balloon gets stuck in a tree branch. Tim is able to free the balloon, but ends up in the dark world. When he finds a vision of Ramina warning him that Ellie is in danger, he manages to escape the world.

Ruf Bilan reveals to Urfin about his plan to open the Emerald Dam floodgates and the city's underwater. Tim reconciles with Ellie, while the crow tells them about Urfin's plans. Tim flees to the floodgate control panel to stop the flood, but is captured by Urfin. Tim escapes and defeats Urfin's army with the slippers. Ellie, Toto, and Tim then manage to return home.

== Cast ==
=== Russian cast ===
- Konstantin Khabensky as Urfin Jus
- Ekaterina Gorokhovskaya as Ellie
- Alexander Bykovsky as Tim
- Dmitri Dyuzhev as Hat
- Dmitry Dyuzhev as Bear
- Andrey Levin as Totoshka
- Yulia Rudina as Clown
- Maria Tsvetkova as Book
- Maxim Sergeev as General
- Valery Solovyov as the Tin Woodman
- Sergey Dyachkov as Terrible
- Aleksandr Boyarsky as Ogre/saber toothed tigers
- Valery Kukhareshin as Lion
- Oleg Kulikovych as Ruf Bilan
- Mikhail Chernyak as crow
- Elizaveta Chaban as Squirrel
- Tatyana Mikhalevkina as Dollars
- Yulia Zorkina as Queen Ramina

=== English cast ===
- Marc Thompson as Urfin Jus, tiger
- Alyson Leigh Rosenfeld as Dorothy
- Eddy Lee as Tim
- Tom Wayland as BFF, Ogre, Tin Man, tiger
- Tyler Bunch (as H.D. Quinn) as Bear, Wooden General
- Erica Schroeder as Toto, Book
- Haven Paschall as Clown
- Mike Pollock as the book, Lion, Ruf Bilan
- Billy Bob Thompson as Scarecrow
- Ryan Andes as the carraci leader
- Brittany Pressley as Ramina, Crow
- Laurie Hymes as Squirrel

== Release ==
Fantastic Return to Oz was released in Russia on 24 October 2019. In February 2020, Wizard Animation signed distribution deals for the film in the United Kingdom, Bulgaria, South Korea, and some South American countries.

== Reception ==
On Kritikanstvo, the film has a 58 score out of 100 based on 3 reviews. A review from Tlum HD stated that viewers will like the new characters, the new dimension, the soundtrack and the cliché that "good always triumphs over evil". However, the film was criticized for its scattered attention and naive characters.
