= 2nd Moscow Jewish Film Festival =

Film festival edition

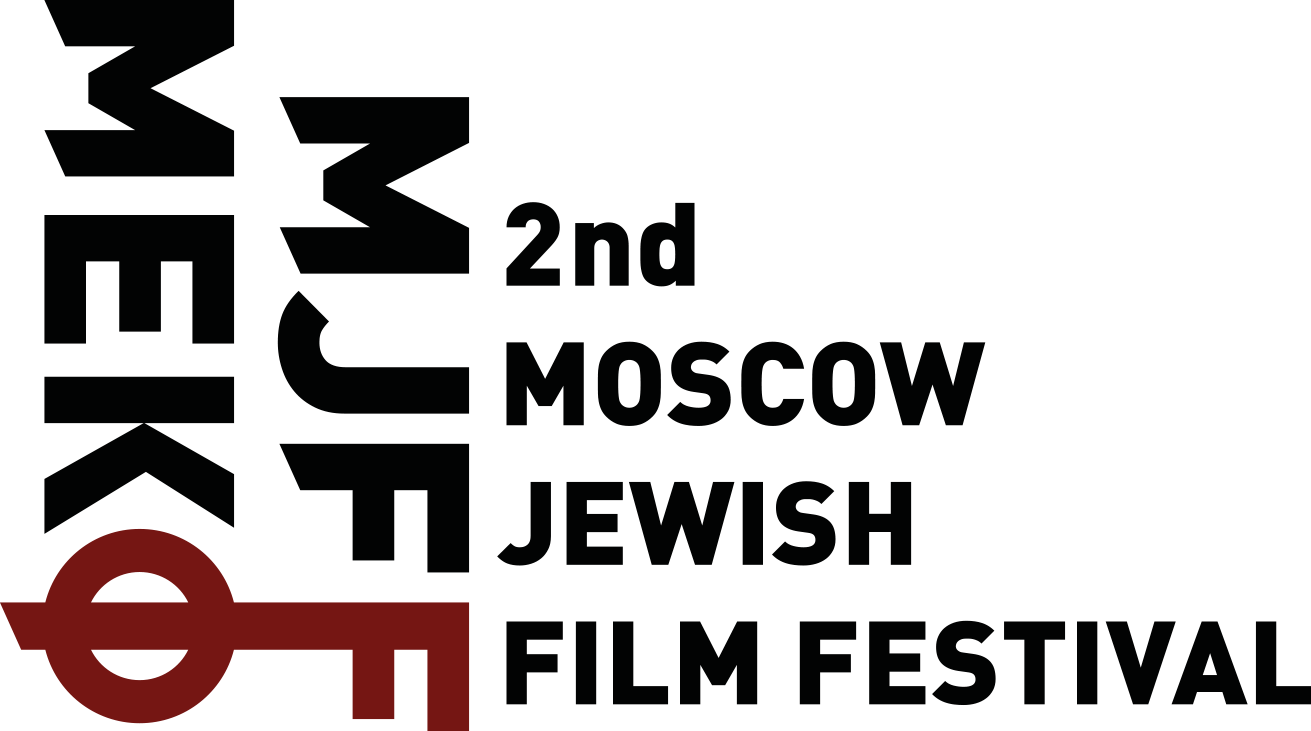

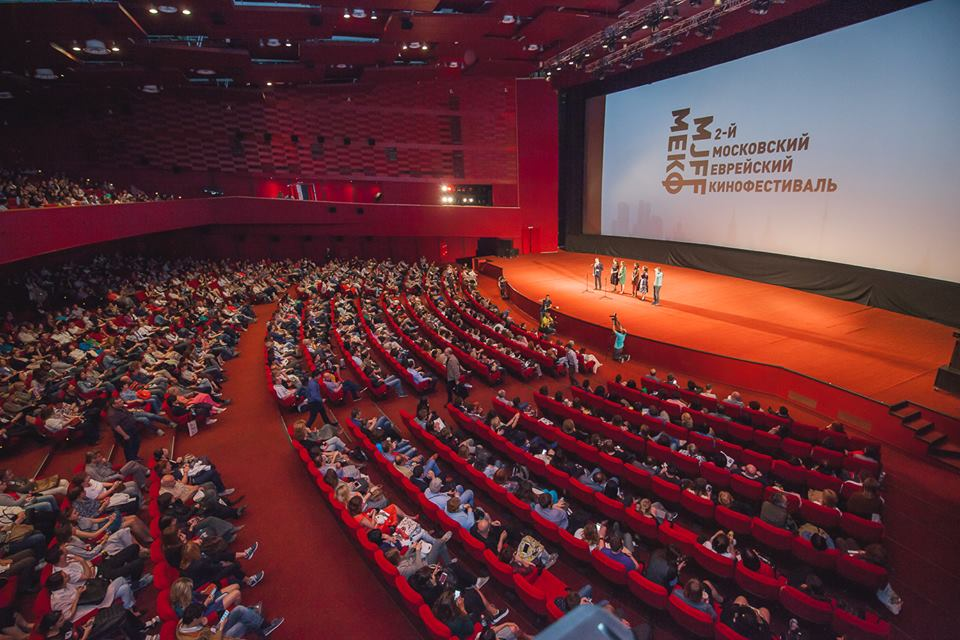
- Location: Moscow, Russia
- Festival date: June 2016
- Website: www.mjff.ru

The 2nd Moscow Jewish Film Festival is an annual international film festival, which aims to gather in the program features, documentaries, shorts and animated films on the subject of Jewish culture, history and national identity and contemporary problems. The festival was held in Moscow from 14 to 21 June 2016, at the Jewish Museum and Tolerance Center, the Documentary film center, cinema GUM and KARO 11 cinema Oktyabr.

== Opening film ==
Opening film of the festival was the directorial debut Natalie Portman A Tale of Love and Darkness. The opening ceremony was held in cinema Oktyabr which gathered about 1,600 spectators.

== Jury ==
- Alexander Boroda — Rabbi, President of the Federation of Jewish Communities of Russia
- Yekaterina Mtsituridze — television presenter, film critic and head of Roskino
- Sofya Kapkova — producer, cultural figure, director of the Documentary film center
- Alexey Ageev — producer
- Alexander Mitta — film director, screenwriter
- Sergey Mokritskiy— film director, operator and scriptwriter

== Creators ==
- CEO and Producer — Egor Odintsov
- Program Director — Vanya Bowden
- Educational Director — Rusina Lekuh
- Producer — Konstantin Fam

== Program ==
=== Main program ===
- Nomination "To the memory":
  - Closer to the Moon (2014) — Romania, United States, Italy, Poland, France
  - Finding Babel (2016) — United States, France, Canada, Russia, Ukraine
  - The Kozalchik Affair (2015) — Israel, Poland
  - Because I was a Painter (2013) — France, Germany
  - Fever at the Dawn (2015) — Hungary
  - Phoenix — Germany, Poland
- Nomination "Context":
  - The village of Peace (2014) — Israel, United States
  - Friends from France (2013) — Russia, France
  - Jerusalem Boxing Club (2015) — Israel
  - To Life! (2014) — France
  - Die Geträumten (2016) — Austria
  - A Tale of Love and Darkness (2015) — United States
  - Brundibar Revisited (2014) — Germany, Czech Republic
  - The Last Mentsch (2014) — Germany
  - The Wandering Muse (2014) — Canada
- Nomination "Conflict":
  - The Dybbuk. A Tale of Wandering Souls (2015) — Poland, Sweden, Ukraine, Israel
  - Jewish cardinal (2013) — France
  - Dough (2015) — United Kingdom, Hungary
  - Beyond the fear (2015) — Israel, Latvia
- Nomination "A short story":
  - Day 40 (2014) — Canada
  - 7 day Gig (2013) — United States
  - Bacon and Gods Wrath (2015) — Canada
  - Incognito (2015) — United Kingdom
  - What Cheer? (2014) — United States
  - The Divorce (2014) — United Kingdom
  - A good Joke (2005) — Canada
  - What's in a Name? (2014) — United States

=== Out of competition ===
- Nomination "Retro":
  - Lullaby (1986) — Poland, Switzerland
  - Love (1991) — USSR
  - Chopin Nocturne (1992) — Russia, United States
  - Protektor (2009) — Czech Republic, Germany
- Nomination "Special screenings":
  - Battle for Sevastopol (2015) — Russia, Ukraine
  - Vladimir Gorikker. Rare genre (2015) — Russia
  - Note (2012) — Russia
  - Son of Saul (2015) — Hungary

=== Education ===
In addition to film screenings educational program was organized in the framework of the festival, consisting of lectures, discussions and debates. The speakers were: director and screenwriter Oleg Dorman, creators The Dybbuk. A Tale of Wandering Souls - Krzysztof Kopczyński and Uri Gershovich, musicologist Layla Kandaurova, theologian and historian Yuri Tabak, film critic Valery Davydov, Alexander Bartosiewicz, Alexander Mitta, Lyudmila Ulitskaya, director Mariya Kravchenko, as well as the lead actor in the movie "Son of Saul" Géza Röhrig.

== Winners ==
- Nomination "To the memory" — Phoenix (2014)
- Nomination "Context" — The Wandering Muse (2014)
- Nomination "Conflict" — The Dybbuk. A Tale of Wandering Souls (2015)
- Nomination "A short story" — The Divorce (2014)
- Special Jury Prize — Finding Babel (2016)]
- Honorary Prize "For outstanding contribution to the development of Jewish cinema in Russia" — Alexander Mitta

== Partners ==
- Federation of Jewish Communities of Russia
- Jewish Museum and Tolerance Center
- Genesis Philanthropy Group
- The network of cinemas "Karo"
- Jewish Agency for Israel
- UJA-Federation of New York
- Roskino
- Ark Pictures

== See also ==
- Ekaterinburg Jewish Film Festival
