= Zvuki Mu (album) =

Studio album by Zvuki Mu
- Released: May 1989
- Recorded: November 1988, Gosteleradio Studio 3, Moscow
- Genres: Experimental rock; post-punk; psychedelic rock
- Length: 39:01
- Label: Opal
- Producer: Brian Eno

Zvuki Mu chronology
Zvuki Mu (1989)	Transnadezhnost (1991)

Zvuki Mu is the debut and only internationally released album by the Russian band Zvuki Mu, released in 1989 and produced by Brian Eno.

The album was released in Russia in 1998 with a bonus track. This Russian reissue was reissued in 2013 on vinyl.

== Recording and release ==
The album was recorded in November 1988 in twelve days in Moscow at the rented Gosteleradio studio, mixing took place in London at Air Studios. This album included material from the two earlier albums Simple Things and Crimea, as well as one new song, "Forgotten Sex".

During the recording process a contradiction in the sound of the material arose, which put a stop to the collaboration: Mamonov strived for a “smooth” sound, refusing Eno's innovative techniques.

The story of this recording is quite traumatic – I wrote about it in the book and, I think, in the annotation to the Russian edition of the album. Brian wanted to record a disk that would somehow emphasize or complement the wildness of Zvuki Mu and their originality, and Pete, on the contrary, wanted everything to be clean, smooth, as cultured as possible, and to sound like Bryan Ferry. It was a case of a scythe on a stone – in this case the scythe was the thin and sharp Brian Eno, and the stone was the blunt Mamonov. And the stone corrupted the scythe. Petya was categorically against the sound production innovations that Eno was proposing. Since Petya was a Russian and brutal man, and Eno was English and delicate, Eno finally gave up and recorded and mixed the album the way Mamonov wanted. The result was, in my opinion, a rather mediocre record. I think it's almost the worst of all Brian Eno's production works.

— Artemy Troitsky

With the release of the album, the band embarked on a tour of Europe and the east coast of the United States, where they were positioned as the "russian Talking Heads". In the UK, the band recorded John Peel session, and in the US had one joint gig with Pere Ubu and paired gig with The Residents on the Lincoln Center stage.

== Reception and legacy ==
Professional ratings
Review scores
Source	Rating
AllMusic	4.5/5 stars
Christgau's Record Guide	B
NME	7/10
Record Mirror	unfavorable

Robert Christgau describing the band's work as "hypnotic cabaret-rock". Jack Barron of NME give positive rating and wrote: "There is something gloomy, dislocated, yet also on occasion intoxicated about Mu's music." Record Mirror criticized the album, writing that, "Zvuki Mu are woefully dated, they make music so grey you can see Moscow's concrete bleakness within the grooves." Spin wrote, "They approach rock music the way a group of aliens might, stumbling over artifacts in a time capsules".

In 2010, the album was ranked 31st in the list of "50 Best Russian Albums of All Time" compiled by the Russian magazine Afisha based on the results of a survey of young Russian musicians.

== Track listing ==
All lyrics are written by Pyotr Mamonov; all music is composed by Zvuki Mu.

No.	Title	Length
1.	"The Source of Infection"	2:51
2.	"Crazy Queen"	3:48
3.	"Forgotten Sex"	5:41
4.	"Zero Minus One"	3:13
5.	"Leave Me Alone"	4:19
6.	"Krym"	2:20
7.	"Gadopiatnika"	6:19
8.	"Paper Flowers"	3:01
9.	"Traffic Policeman"	3:45
10.	"Zima (Winter)"	3:03

Bonus track only on Russian CD and vinyl editions
No.	Title	Length
11.	"Zima (Winter)" (Dance Remix by Mark Kamins)	5:13

== Personal ==
Adapted from the album liner notes.

Zvuki Mu

- Pyotr Mamonov – vocals
- Aleksandr Lipnitsky – bass
- Aleksey Bortniychuk – guitar
- Pavel Hotin – keyboards, backing vocals
- Aleksey Pavlov – drums

Additional personnel

- Brian Eno – production
- Ian Cooper – mastering
- Lance Phillips – sound engineer
- Leonard Zezyulin – sound engineer
- Yuri Rodin – cover design
