= Leonid Vladimirsky =

Russian illustrator (1920–2015)

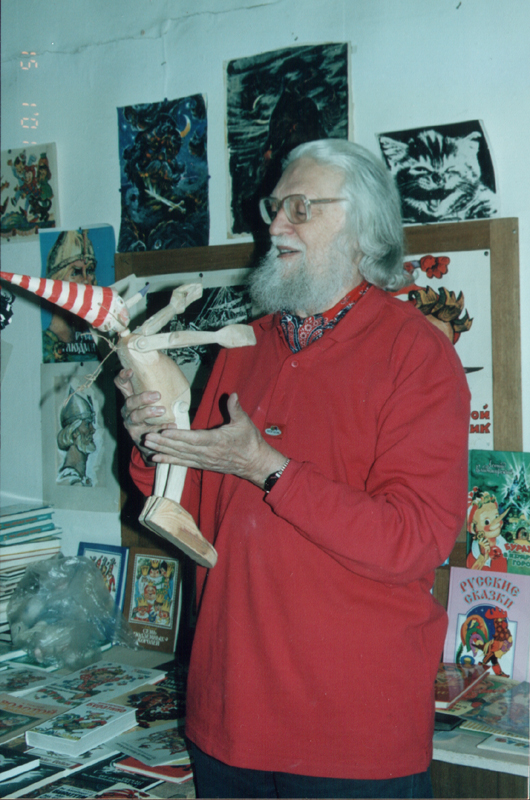
- Born: Leonid Viktorovich Vladimirsky; 21 September 1920; Moscow, Russian SFSR
- Died: 18 April 2015 (aged 94); Moscow, Russia

Leonid Viktorovich Vladimirsky (Russian: Леонид Викторович Владимирский; 21 September 1920, Moscow – 18 April 2015, Moscow) was a Russian illustrator who worked on fairy tales, including books by Alexander Pushkin (Ruslan and Ludmila), Aleksey Tolstoy (The Golden Key, or The Adventures of Buratino, 1953), and Alexander Volkov (The Wizard of the Emerald City), as well as some folk tales.

Vladimirsky graduated from Gerasimov Institute of Cinematography but decided to work as a book illustrator. He found it easiest to create evil characters, which are easily derived from the everyday life.

Books illustrated by Vladimirsky sold over 20 million copies. His illustrations to Tolstoy and Volkov were so popular in the Soviet Union that they were commonly reproduced on common goods including bottles of soft drinks and postcards.
