= Kopczyński =

Kopczyński (feminine: Kopczyńska; plural: Kopczyńscy) is a Polish surname. Notable people include:

- Adam Kopczyński (1948–2021), Polish ice hockey player
- Jacek Kopczyński (born 1971), Polish actor
- Krzysztof Kopczyński (born 1959), Polish author
- Michał Kopczyński (born 1992), Polish footballer
- Onufry Kopczyński (1736–1817), Polish educator and scholar
