= Roskino =

Russian film export agency

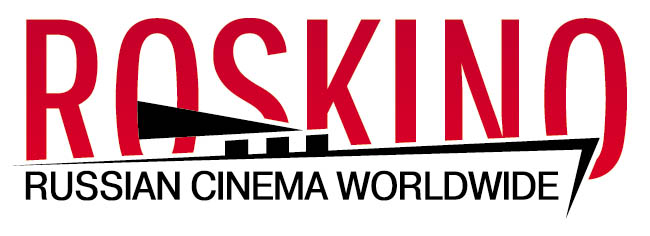
ROSKINO logo

Roskino (Russian: Роскино), formerly Roskomkino (Роскомкино), is a state body representing the Russian industry of audiovisual content on the international markets, a national operator for the promotion of films, series and cartoons as well as the creative potential of Russian talents abroad and co-production opportunities within Russia.

== History ==
Intorgkino was created in 1924 to promote Soviet Russian film productions, and later all Soviet film production, abroad. It became Sovexportfilm in 1945. When the Soviet Union ended and the Russian Republic began, Roskino took over the functions of Sovexportfilm.

In the Soviet era, Roskino held the distribution rights to Poland-produced movies. 200 Polish movies are still commercially distributed by Roskino, which doesn't share revenues with the Polish Film Institute. In this reciprocal deal, the Polish Film Institute is a non-profit association that is not allowed to exploit the +1000 Russian films it holds the distribution rights for.

On 30 September 1992, the State Committee of the Russian Federation for Cinematography was created, which was called Roskomkino (Роскомкино). By a decree of 14 August 1996 it was made from "State Committee" into "Committee" (Russian: Роскино). It was modeled on the Soviet Goskino. Later, Sovexportfilm was officially abolished by the President on May 12, 2008, with its functions handed over to the Ministry of Culture of the Russian Federation.

Since 2008, Roskino's Russian pavilion has been a regular member of the Cannes Film Festival. In 2012, Roskino opened a promotion office in Los Angeles. In 2014, Roskino and CTC Media signed a distribution deal with Hulu and Roskino opened an office in the UK.

In February 2020, Evgenia Markova was named CEO of Roskino, replacing Catherine Mtsitouridze who had served for nine consecutive years. In May 2020, Roskino introduced its first digital distribution platform to promote 300 Russian projects (films, series, animations, and documentaries).

== Description ==
Roskino is a state body representing the Russian industry of audiovisual content on the international markets, a national operator for the promotion of films, series and animation as well as the creative potential of Russian talents abroad and co-production opportunities within the Russian Federation.

It also acts as an industrial expert and advisor to Russian content makers in terms of international promotion; conducts research on the foreign content markets; organizes tailor-made educational and coaching programs aimed at the development and integration of Russia into the world content industry. It promotes Russian content at key international film markets such as the European Film Market in Berlin, FILMART in Hong Kong, Marché du Film in Cannes, TIFF Industry in Toronto, American Film Market in LA and others. Roskino also organizes Russian film festivals abroad.

The company also helps to attract investors interested in co-production within Russia. Its primary aim is to develop effective systems to support Russian content in foreign countries and promote Russia as a solid partner for international cooperation and enhance the transparency of the Russian content market.

== Presidents ==
- 1982 – 1995 Oleg Rudnev
- 1995 – 2011 Grigory Gevorkyan
- 2011 – 2020 Yekaterina Mtsituridze
- 2020 – 2022 Evgenia Markova
- 2022 – 2023 Inna Shalyto
- 2023 – present Ekaterina Naumova

== Filmography ==
=== Intorgkino ===
- Alexander Nevsky (1938), distributor
- Black Napoleon unreleased Paul Robeson film
- Sud idyet (1943)

=== Sovexportfilm ===
- Old Khottabych (1956), distributor
- Gypsies Are Found Near Heaven, distributor
- Fate of a Man, Distributor
- Well, Just You Wait!, distributor

=== Roskino ===
- Fantastic Journey to Oz
- The Snow Queen (2012)

== See also ==
- Cinema of Russia
- Cinema of the Soviet Union
- Cinema Foundation of Russia
- Mosfilm, film studio
- Gosfilmofond, state film archive
