= The Island (2006 film) =

- Film poster
- Russian: Остров
- Directed by: Pavel Lungin
- Written by: Dmitry Sobolev
- Produced by: Pavel Lungin; Sergei Shumakov; Olga Vasilieva
- Starring: Pyotr Mamonov; Viktor Sukhorukov; Dmitri Dyuzhev
- Cinematography: Andrei Zhegalov
- Edited by: Albina Altipenko
- Music by: Vladimir Martynov
- Production company: Pavel Lungin Studio
- Distributed by: Nashe Kino
- Release dates: 27 June 2006 (Moscow); 9 September 2006 (Venice); 11 September 2006 (Toronto); 23 November 2006 (Russia)
- Running time: 112 minutes
- Country: Russia
- Languages: Russian; German
- Box office: US$3.6 million

The Island (Russian: Остров, romanized: Ostrov) is a 2006 Russian comedy-drama film directed by Pavel Lungin and written by Dmitry Sobolev. The film stars Pyotr Mamonov as a fictional 20th-century Eastern Orthodox monk.

Filming took place in the city of Kem, in Karelia, on the shores of the White Sea. The film closed the 2006 Venice Film Festival, proved to be a moderate box-office success and won both the Nika Award and the China TV Golden Eagle Award as the Best Russian film of 2006. It received generally positive reviews from critics.

== Filming ==
The script of the film was written by Dmitry Sobolev, a graduate of Gerasimov Institute of Cinematography, and this script became his thesis. As the screenwriter noted: "I had a period in my life when I was reading theological literature, trying to understand something for myself. In principle, this is the second scenario related to Orthodoxy. In the first scenario, there was an Orthodox priest. Therefore, the idea was hatched for a long time, until this scheme of temptation, repentance and forgiveness matured. After that, everything happened. I have read the lives of many ascetics and the images of the main character are based on Theophilus of the Caves and Sebastian of Karaganda." Later, the agent sent the script to Pavel Lungin. When starting work on the film, Lungin announced that he would not shoot the film without Mamonov: "He is a man of boundless talent, and I would call him the rarest human being. We all belong to some categories, classes. And he's out of everything — he's the only one..."

The film group took a long time to choose a place for filming the "Island". There were four expeditions: the film crew traveled through the Murmansk Oblast, visited Ladoga, Onega, Kizhi, and the Pskov lakes. None of the monasteries situated in those places suited the director, as he needed "a small, abandoned hermitage, and all modern monasteries are huge, walled towns." During the fifth trip, nature was found — it was the outskirts of the small settlement of Rabocheostrovsk on the White Sea coast in Karelia. Everything came up: the landscape, which corresponded to the plans of the screenwriter and the production designer, and the natural scenery. There is a sea around, in which islands are scattered. On land there is an old navigation tower, half—abandoned houses. The island became a peninsula connected to the mainland by a small isthmus. The tower was transformed into a bell tower, the barrack without a roof was turned into a church: domes were built on, patched up, walls were "sawn" inside to create a single space. Of particular importance to the director was a flooded wooden barge, to which the entire decoration of the monastery was tied. According to the director, the barge most likely remained from the prisoners: "It is old, with forged nails — clearly the twenties.".

According to Pavel Lungin, the main actor Pyotr Mamonov "played himself to a large extent." Before starting work in the film, the actor received a blessing from his confessor. In addition, Hieromonk Cosmas (Afanasyev), a resident of the Donskoy Monastery, was with the film crew as a consultant, who was invited by Mamonov. Before becoming a monk, he was an actor himself, and was an extra in Lungin's movie Taxi Blues. According to Hieromonk Cosmas: "There was little time allocated: all the filming was compressed into 40 days, since the budget was more than modest. When we went there, there was a feeling that some nonsense would eventually happen, nothing would work out. The mood of the film crew was as if everything would come down to a joke: KVN, that's all." On the first day of filming, Hieromonk Cosmas served a moleben.

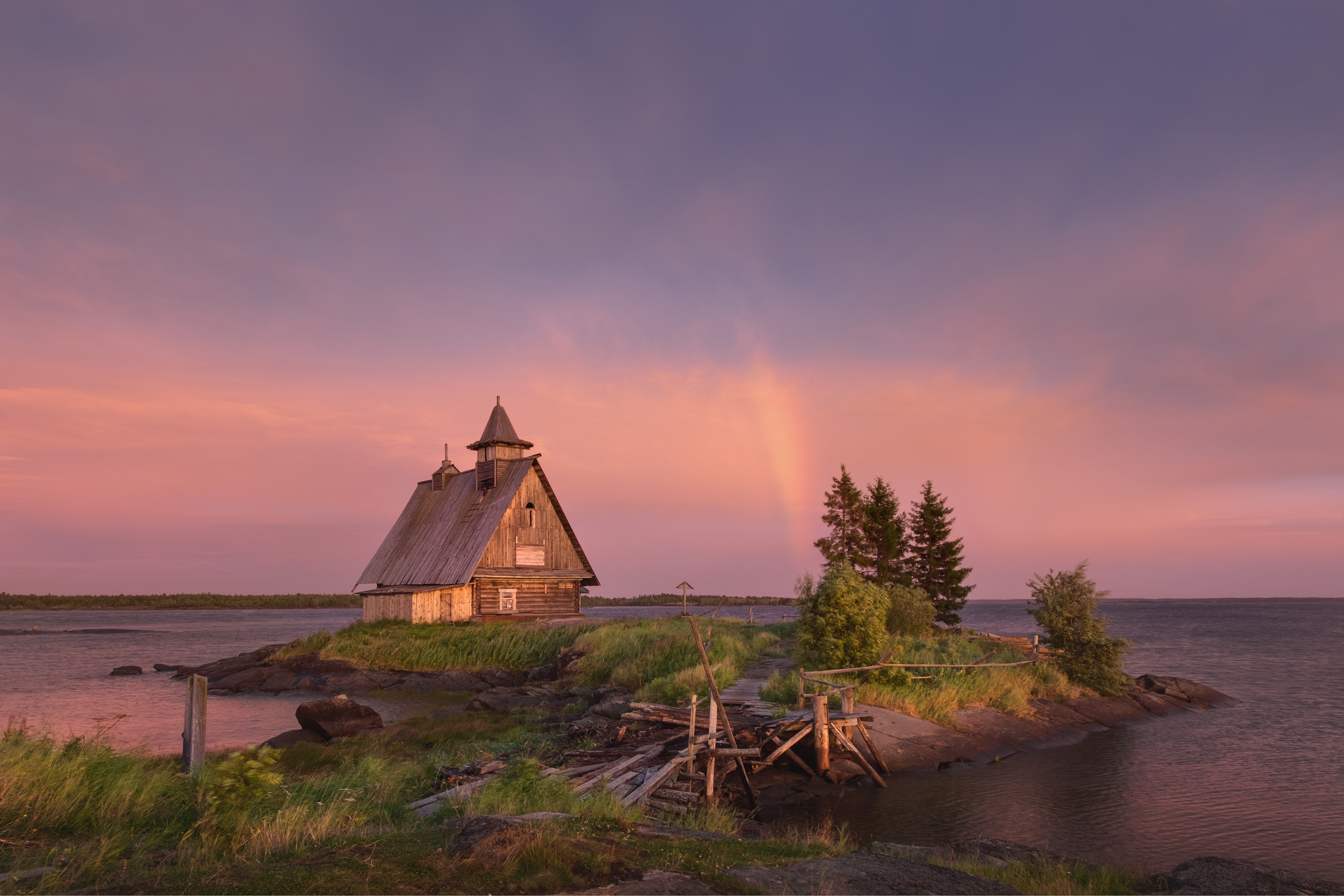
Chapel made for the film as of August 2015

The film crew had to shoot quickly. It was necessary to finish filming before the White Sea was covered with ice. Filming began in October and ended in early December 2005. According to Hieromonk Cosmas: "they began to take pictures, and slowly, just like a puzzle began to take shape. There, in the north, the nature is amazing: such a scale, silence, concentration. The house itself, where Father Anatoly lives, played by Peter, was at one time a punishment cell. A huge number of people passed through this torture chamber, many were killed here. There are graves next to the set – tens of thousands are buried there, as at the Butovo firing range. Everything everywhere was on the relics. The proximity of Solovki. The place was prayerful. All of this, of course, could not but affect. And we were also very afraid of the cold there. But now the shooting is underway, and there are still no frosts, despite all the weather reports and the climatic calendar of those latitudes. The grace of God. The locals have already dragged out all the boats so that the ice does not bind them, and the temperature was acceptable... Only at the end, when they were shooting the last scene (where Father Anatoly chastises the demoniac), suddenly it snowed. And this artistically turned out to be a very accurate accent, symbolizing purification – the renewal of the life of a person previously enslaved by the dark force."

In 2007, director Pavel Lungin said about the filming process: "We lived ... on the outskirts of a working village in a small empty hotel. There is a pier where ships leave for the Solovetsky Islands. In winter, of course, they no longer walked. From there, prisoners were sent to camps at one time. These are places that were breathed by the first Russian holiness, ascetics, monasteries and at the same time watered with the blood of unknown martyrs of Soviet times. There was barbed wire, rusty rails. The barge that we sank in the painting has also been preserved from those times. It was on such barges that prisoners were taken to Solovki. Therefore, this place was special for us. Throughout the filming, we had a wonderful sense of community in the group, no stranger came to us. We have very happy memories. The actors played better than ever. Cameraman Andrey Zhegalov made some kind of colossal breakthrough and filmed in a way he had never filmed before. Together, we have done more than each of us could individually. It happens once in a lifetime. And I'm happy that this happened in my life."

Only five days of filming were conducted outside of Rabocheostrovsk. The war scenes were filmed on the Volga, near Dubna; according to the producer of the film Vadim Koryuzlov, "they were filmed at night so that it would not be visible that this is not the sea, but the river." The scene where Nastya and her father Tikhon are going on a train was filmed at the Rizhsky railway station in Moscow.

== Plot ==
During World War II, the sailor Anatoly and his captain, Tikhon, are captured by the Germans when they board their barge and tugboat, which is carrying a shipment of coal. The German officer leading the raid offers Anatoly – who is terrified of dying – the choice to be shot or to shoot Tikhon and stay alive, which Anatoly takes; he shoots, and Tikhon falls overboard. The Germans blow up the ship but Anatoly is found by Russian Orthodox monks on the shore the next morning. He survives and becomes a stoker at the monastery but is perpetually overcome with guilt.

Thirty years pass. Anatoly, a fool for Christ, now has the gifts of prophecy and healing. But the other monks do not really understand him. People come to see Anatoly for cures and guidance, but even now, he remains in a perpetual state of repentance. He often gets in a boat and goes to an uninhabited island where he prays for mercy and forgiveness and for Tikhon's soul.

Many years pass, and an admiral of the North Fleet arrives at the monastery. He brings his daughter who is possessed by a demon, but Anatoly exorcises it. The admiral turns out to be Tikhon. It is revealed that Anatoly only wounded him in the arm. Tikhon forgives Anatoly.

Anatoly announces his death by Wednesday; the monks provide a coffin. Dressed in a white garment such as Jesus wore or as an Orthodox baptismal garment, he lies in the coffin, wearing a crucifix. Monks, one carrying a large cross representing the risen Christ, are seen rowing the coffin away from the island.

== Spiritual message ==
The film is focused on father Anatoly's repentance of his sin (therefore the virtually continuous occurrence of the Jesus Prayer); but the transgressions of the depicted character (a fool for Christ) and their impact on the others are the means by which the actual plot develops. The film's director, Lungin, speaking of the central character's self-awareness, said he does not regard him as being clever or spiritual, but blessed "in the sense that he is an exposed nerve, which connects to the pains of this world. His absolute power is a reaction to the pain of those people who come to it"; while "typically, when the miracle happens, the lay people asking for a miracle are always dissatisfied" because "the world does not tolerate domestic miracles."

Screenwriter Dmitry Sobolev further explains: "When a person asks God for something, he is often wrong because God has a better understanding of what a person needs at that moment." Pyotr Mamonov, who plays the lead character, formerly one of the few rock musicians in the USSR, converted to Eastern Orthodoxy in the 1990s and lived in an isolated village until his death, in 2021. Pavel Lungin said about him that "to a large extent, he played himself." Mamonov received a blessing from his confessor for playing the character.

The then-Patriarch of Moscow, Alexius II (who held the office from 1990–2008), praised Ostrov for its profound depiction of faith and monastic life, calling it a "vivid example of an effort to take a Christian approach to culture."

== Cast ==
- Pyotr Mamonov as Father Anatolius
- Viktor Sukhorukov as Father Philaret
- Dmitri Dyuzhev as Father Job
- Yuriy Kuznetsov as Tikhon
- Viktoriya Isakova as Nastya
- Nina Usatova as the widow
- Jana Esipovich as the young woman
- Olga Demidova as the woman with a child
- Timofey Tribuntsev as young Anatoly
- Aleksei Zelensky as young Tikhon
- Grisha Stepunov as the child
- Sergey Burunov as the adjutant

== Crew ==
- Writer: Dmitry Sobolev
- Director: Pavel Lungin
- Producers:
  - Pavel Lungin — main producer
  - Sergei Shumakov — main producer
  - Olga Vasilieva — producer
- Stage-manager: Andrei Zhegalov
- Artistic Directors:
  - Igor Kotsarev
  - Alexander Tolkachev
- Composer: Vladimir Martynov
- Sound:
  - Stefan Albine
  - Vladimir Litrovnik
- Montage: Albina Antipenko
- Costumes: Ekaterina Dyminskaya

== Critical reception ==
On review aggregator website Rotten Tomatoes, the film holds an approval rating of 63% based on 19 reviews, and an average rating of 5.9/10. Derek Adams of Time Out described the film as "both heartfelt and ultimately optimistic" in a generally positive review. Wesley Morris, writing for The Boston Globe, gave the film 2 and a half stars, called the film "an aggravating combination of piousness, arty self-pity, and knowing silliness meant to speak to higher spiritual truths".

== Awards ==
- 2006 — Best Film at the Moscow Premiere festival.
- 2007 — Six awards at the fifth national Golden Eagle Awards – "Best film", "Best male support role" (Viktor Suhorukov), "Best male role" (Petr Mamonov), "Best director" (Pavel Lungin), "Best scenario" (Dmitry Sobolev), "Best operator work" (Andrei Zhegalov).
- 2007 - Nika Awards for Best Picture, Best Director, Best Actor, Best Supporting Actor, etc.

== Gallery ==
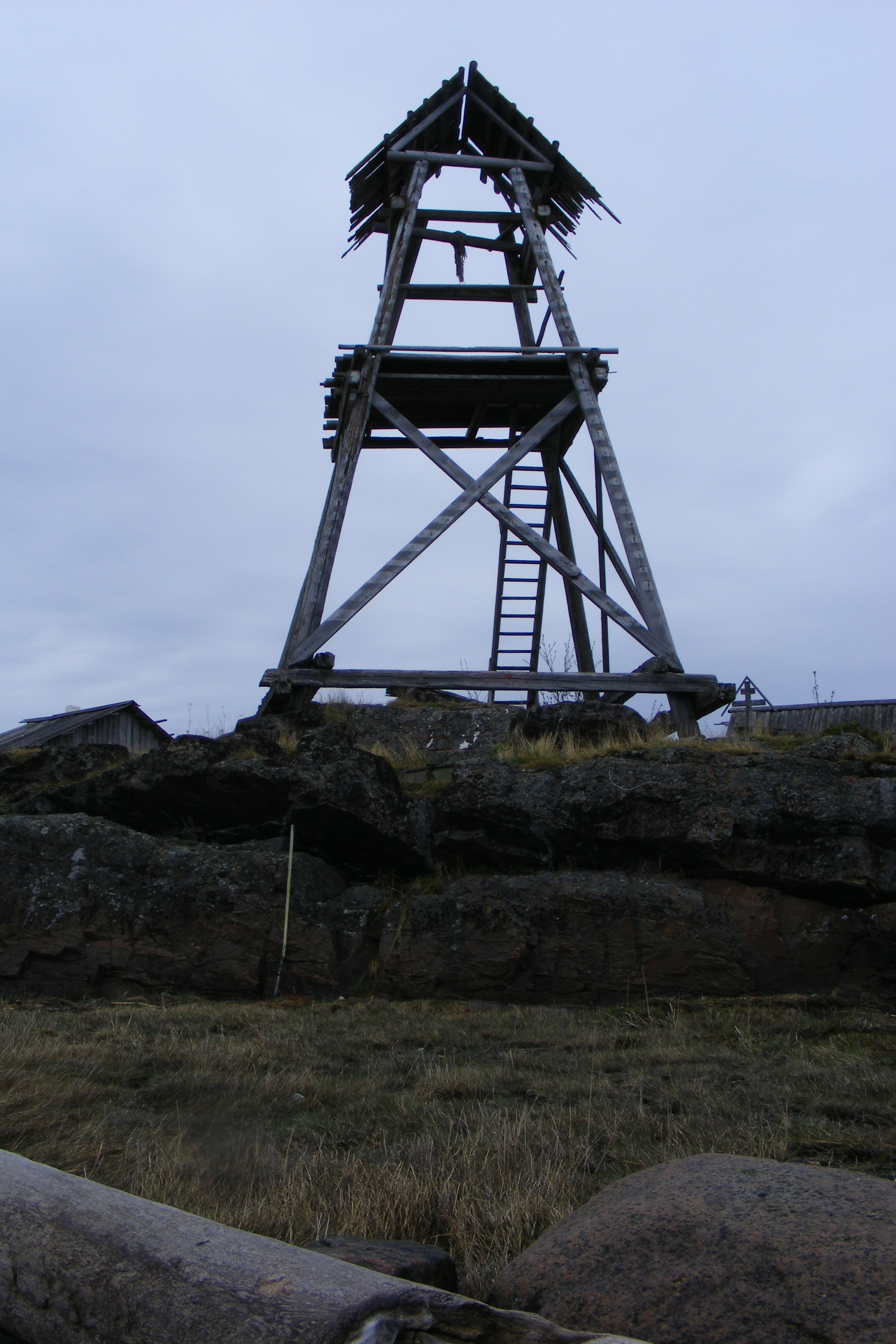
Bell tower

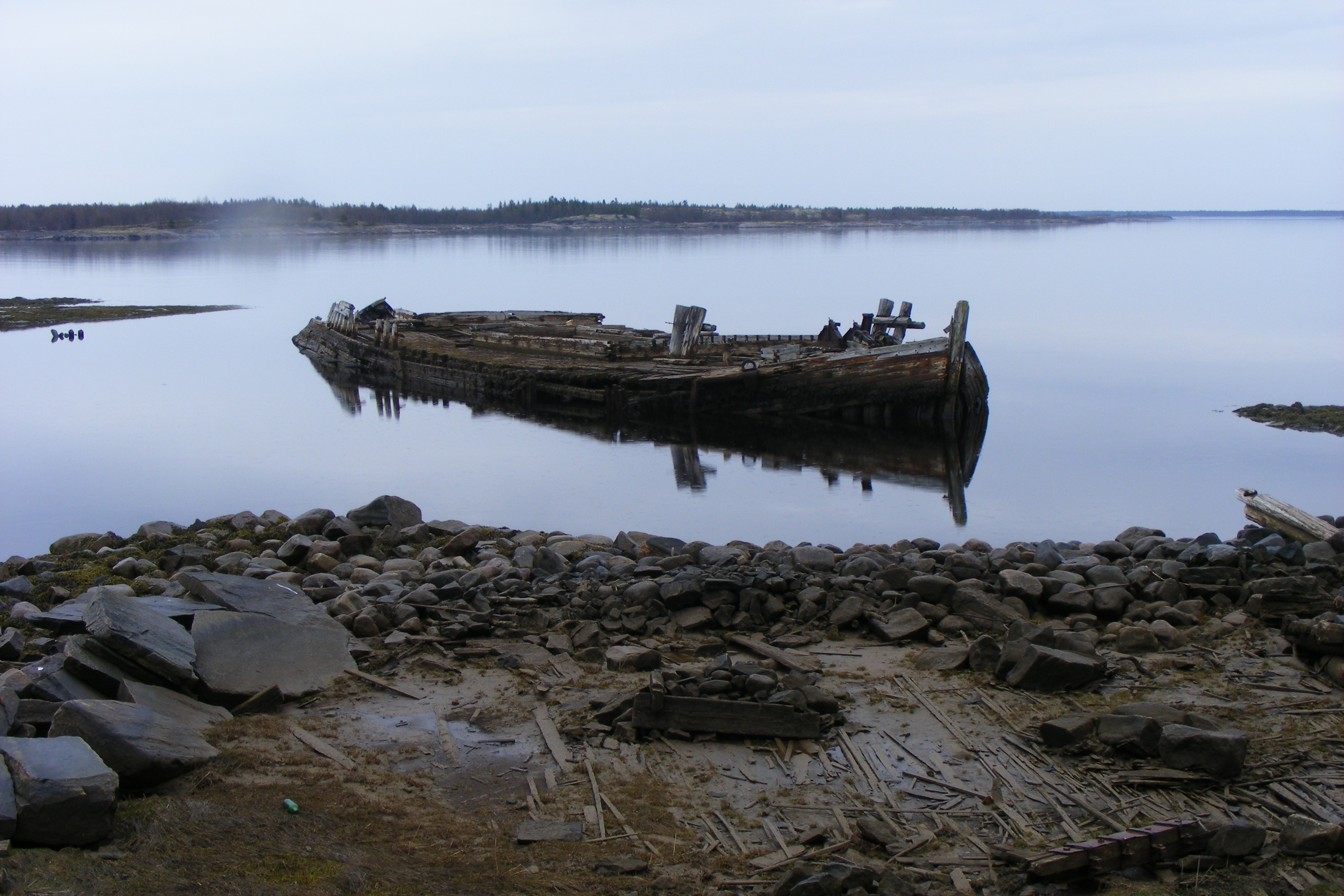
Barge

== See also ==
- Starets, the type of character portrayed in the film
- Jesus Prayer
