= Zvuki Mu =

Russian rock band

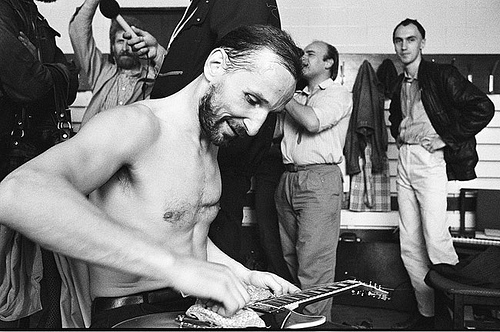
- Zvuki Mu before a show in Vilnius, 1988

Background information
- Origin: Moscow, Russia
- Genres: Experimental rock; lo-fi; post-punk; alternative rock
- Years active: 1983–1990; 1993–2005; 2015–2021
- Members: Pyotr Mamonov; Grant Minassian; Ilya Urezchenko; Alex Gritskevich; Slava Losev
- Past members: Aleksandr Lipnitsky; Aleksey Bortniychuk; Karen Sarkisov; Pavel Hotin; Aleksey Pavlov

Zvuki Mu (Russian: Зву́ки Му [ˈzvukʲɪ ˈmu], roughly translated as "Sounds of Moo", sounding to the Russian ear as a humorous abbreviation of Zvuki Muzyki, the Russian translation for The Sound of Music) was a Russian alternative rock/indie/post-punk band founded in Moscow in 1983. Lead singer and songwriter Pyotr Mamonov was one of the most revered and eccentric figures of the Russian art scene, whose absurdist lyrics are as playful and disturbing as his vocal style and explosive on-stage presence.

The 2013 video for The National's single "Sea of Love", directed by Sophia Peer, was based on Zvuki Mu's video for Grubyj Zakat. In 2015, Mamonov reunited the band with new members, called "Brand new Zvuki Mu".

== Discography ==
- 1988 – Simple Things / "Простые Вещи" / "Simple Things"
- 1989 – Zvuki Mu / Звуки Му / "Sounds of Mu"
- 1991 – Transnadyozhnost'/ Транснадёжность / "Transreliability"
- 1992 – Mamonov I Aleksey / Мамонов И Алексей / "Mamonov and Aleksey"
- 1994 – Krym / Крым / "Crimea" (recorded 1988)
- 1995 – Grubiy Zakat / Грубый Закат / "Rough Sunset"
- 1995 – Instrumental'nie Variatsii / Инструментальные Вариации / "Instrumental Variations"
- 1996 – Zhizn' Amfibiy Kak Ona Est' / Жизнь Амфибии Как Она Есть / "Life Of Amphibians As It Is"
- 1996 – Prostie Veshi / Простые Вещи / "Simple Things" (recorded 1988)
- 1996 – Mamonov 84-87
- 1997 – Legendy Ruskogo Roka / Легенды Русского Рока / "Legends of Russian Rock"
- 1999 – Shkura Neubitogo / Шкура Неубитого / " Pelt of Unkilled"
- 2000 – Nabral Khoroshih Na Odin Kompakt / Набрал Хороших На Один Компакт / "Have Picked Good (Songs) On One Compact (Disk)"
- 2000 – Shokoladniy Pushkin / Шоколадный Пушкин / "Chocolate Pushkin"
- 2002 – Shkura Neubitogo 2 / Шкура Неубитого 2 / "Pelt of Unkilled 2"
- 2002 – Elektro T / Электро T / "Electro T"
- 2003 – Myshi 2002 / Мыши 2002 / "Mice 2002"
- 2003 – Zelyonenkiy / Зелёненький / "(Little) Green"
- 2003 – Velikoe Molchanie Vagona Metro / Великое Молчание Вагона Метро / "The Great Silence of Metro Wagon"
- 2005 – Skazki Bratiev Grimm / Сказки Братьев Грим / "Tales of The Brothers Grimm"
- 2022 – Neznayka / Незнайка / "Dunno"
