= Michel Dorfman =

Rabbi Yechiel Michel Dorfman
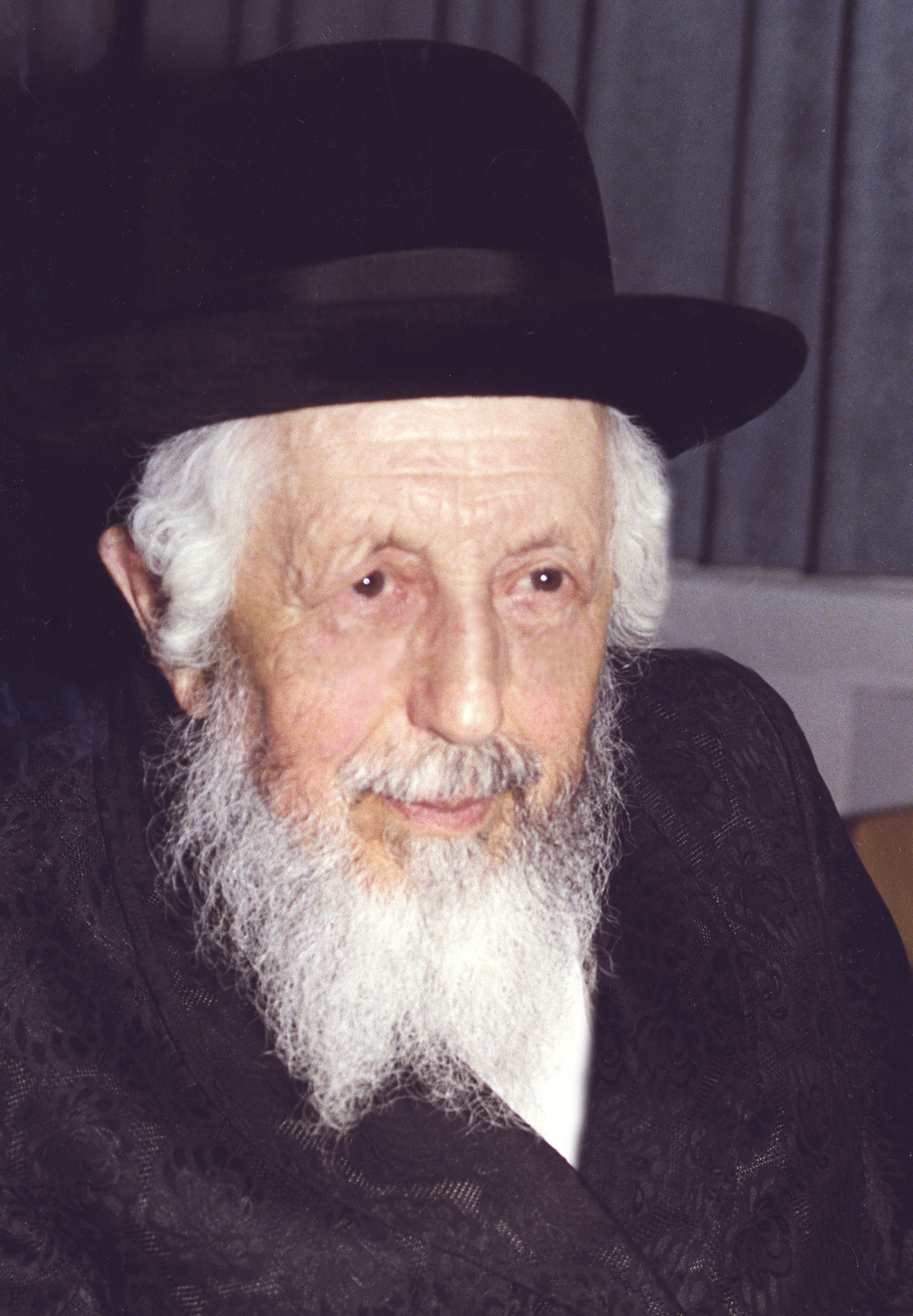
- Dorfman in Jerusalem in 1988

Personal life
- Born: 1913 Kamenetz-Podolsk, Ukraine
- Died: 30 July 2006 (aged 92–93) Jerusalem
- Buried: Mount of Olives
- Spouse: Rivkah Sternhartz
- Parent: Rabbi Yehoshua Dovid Dorfman

Religious life
- Religion: Judaism

Yechiel Michel Dorfman (1913 – 30 July 2006) was a rabbi and leader of the Breslov community in Jerusalem, Israel after serving as the de facto head of the Breslover Hasidim living in post-Stalin Russia. Due to his persistence and planning, the annual Breslover Rosh Hashana kibbutz (prayer gathering) at the grave of Rebbe Nachman of Breslov in Uman, Ukraine, which began in 1811, continued in secret despite the Communist ban on religious gatherings.

== Biography ==
Rabbi Dorfman was born in Kamenetz-Podolsk in western Ukraine and became a Breslover Hasid in his early teens. He moved to Uman and became a close student of Rabbi Abraham Sternhartz, a leading Breslover figure. In February 1930 he married the granddaughter of Sternhartz, Rivkah, who was a descendant of Rabbi Nathan of Breslov through both her mother and father.

During the Great Purge in Ukraine in the late 1930s, Dorfman escaped to Leningrad, where he and his wife survived World War II. However, after the war he was arrested by the NKVD and incarcerated in Lubyanka prison in Moscow for two years and then exiled to Siberia for another five and a half years. Upon the death of Stalin in 1953, he was given a reprieve and allowed to settle in Moscow.

Dorfman was certified as a shochet (ritual slaughterer) by the rabbi of Poltava. He alternately supported his family as a tailor, shoemaker, and bookbinder during his years in Russia.

== Breslov leader ==
After World War II, the few remaining Breslover Hasidim in Russia moved far away from the government center in Moscow to areas such as Tashkent, where religious practices were still forbidden but government scrutiny was less intense. During the year, these scattered Hasidim did not keep in contact with each other. However, before each Rosh Hashanah, they would go to public pay phones to call Dorfman in Moscow, who updated them on details of the upcoming holiday pilgrimage to Uman. Dorfman also corresponded with Hasidim who lived in remote areas, encouraging them to come to Uman.

Dorfman served as one of the prayer leaders at the secret Rosh Hashanah services, which were held every year in a house near Rebbe Nachman's gravesite. In contrast to the hundreds of Hasidim who participated in the Rosh Hashana kibbutz during the nineteenth and early-twentieth centuries, only enough men for a minyan (prayer quorum of 10 men) risked their lives to make the annual pilgrimage during and after the Stalin government.

== Foreign tourists to Rebbe Nachman's gravesite ==
In the mid-1960s Dorfman began escorting American citizens to Uman to show them Rebbe Nachman's gravesite. During World War II, a fierce battle between the Russians and Nazis for control of Uman had demolished the ancient cemetery in which Rebbe Nachman was buried. The cemetery was razed and housing lots were constructed on it. The grave of Rebbe Nachman was rediscovered and a private house built directly adjacent protected it from desecration. Only with the aid of someone like Dorfman, who traveled to the gravesite several times a year, could foreigners hope to locate it.

By aiding foreign tourists, Dorfman placed himself in great personal danger. The government only issued tourist visas to large cities like Kyiv or Odesa, not to Uman; thus, Dorfman was aiding illegal tourists. Due to his efforts, however, several hundred American and Israeli citizens were able to visit Uman. The increasing number of visitors and requests for visas to Uman in the 1960s, '70s, and '80s put pressure on the Soviet government to ease its restrictions. Finally the gates opened entirely with the fall of Communism in 1989.

== Aliyah to Israel ==
After 38 consecutive years of petitioning the government through official and private channels, Dorfman and his wife finally received their exit visas in 1972 and immigrated to Israel. Dorfman was appointed by Rabbi Levi Yitzchok Bender as Rosh Yeshiva of the Breslov Yeshiva in Meah Shearim. He died on 5 Av 5766 (July 30, 2006).

== See also ==
- Breslov (Hasidic dynasty)
- Nachman of Breslov
- Rosh Hashana kibbutz (Breslov)
