= Yitzchok Breiter =

Polish Breslov rabbi

Yitzchok Breiter (1886-1943?) was a Breslover Hasidic rabbi who spread the teachings of Rebbe Nachman of Breslov beyond their origins in Ukraine to the country of Poland during the 1920s to 1930s.

== Biography ==
Born in Poland 76 years after Rebbe Nachman's death, Breiter grew up without ever having heard about Breslover Hasidut. He first came across a copy of Rebbe Nachman's Likutey Moharan while learning in yeshiva in Lublin, and was impressed by the wisdom and faith it contained. He hid the book to read it again the next day, but when he returned, it had disappeared.

A few weeks later he came across a copy of Parparaot LeChochmah by the Tcheriner Rav, Rabbi Nachman Goldstein, which is a scholarly commentary on Likutey Moharan. In this volume, Breiter found information which helped him make contact with the Breslover Hasidim in Russia. The next Rosh Hashana, he made the first of many trips to Rebbe Nachman's gravesite in Uman.

These pilgrimages ended in 1917, when the Russian Revolution sealed the border between Poland and Communist Russia. Barred from visiting Rebbe Nachman's grave, Breiter composed an emotional prayer asking to be able to visit Uman once again. This prayer was recited by Breslover Hasidim around the world for more than 70 years, until the fall of Communism in 1989. Unable to travel to the annual Breslover Rosh Hashana kibbutz (prayer gathering) in Uman, Breiter established a similar holiday gathering in Lublin.

Breiter was a fiery, charismatic orator who was instrumental in increasing the numbers of Polish Breslover Hasidim to several thousand by the 1930s, making him one of the more important leaders of pre-World War II Breslov Hasidim. He was one of the Breslov leaders to whom Rabbi Yisroel Ber Odesser sent his petek for verification; the petek was returned without comment to Odesser on the last ship out of Poland before the German invasion of Poland.

== Holocaust ==
Breiter was a recognized elder in the Warsaw Ghetto during the Nazi occupation of Poland. He was deported on one of the transports to Treblinka, where he was murdered.

== Publications ==
Breiter wrote several scholarly works, including Seder HaYom ("Order of the Day"), which explains how to apply Rebbe Nachman’s teachings to one's daily life, and Sheva Amudei Emunah ("Seven Pillars of Faith"), a primer for developing one's faith.

He also composed the stirring song Chidush Kemoso ("A Novelty Like Him") in praise of Rebbe Nachman, which is often sung at Breslover gatherings.

Yitzchok Breiter composed a confession to be said by the tomb of Rebbe Nachman.
