= Aleksandr Lipnitsky =

Russian journalist (1952–2021)

Aleksandr Davidovich Lipnitsky
- Александр Давидович Липницкий
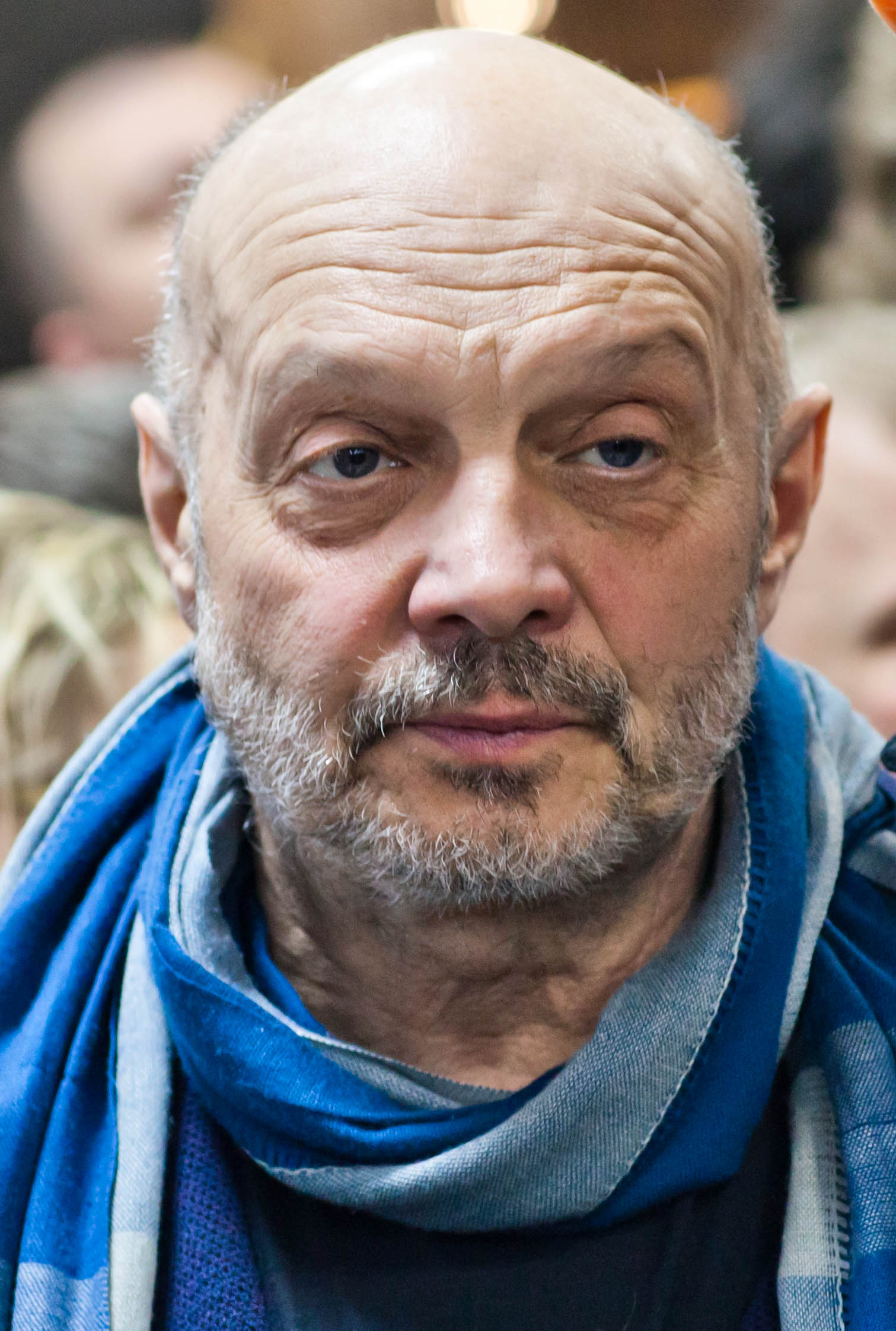
- Lipnitsky in 2019
- Born: 8 July 1952; Moscow, USSR
- Died: 25 March 2021 (aged 68); Nikolina Gora, Moscow Oblast, Russia

Aleksandr Davidovich Lipnitsky (Russian: Алекса́ндр Дави́дович Липни́цкий; 8 July 1952 – 25 March 2021) was a Soviet and Russian journalist, writer, and musician. He was one of the founders of the Soviet rock group Zvuki Mu.

== Biography ==
Aleksandr Lipnitsky was born on 8 July 1952 in Moscow. Lipnitsky was the grandson of the actress Tatyana Okunevskaya and the homeopathic doctor Teodor Lipnitsky. His father, David Teodorovich Lipnitsky (1921–1994) was also a homeopathic doctor. His stepfather, Viktor Sukhodrev, was the personal translator of Nikita Khrushchev and Leonid Brezhnev. His mother, Inga Sukhodrev (née Okunevskaya-Varlamova) (1933–2013), was an English teacher. His brother was Vladimir Lipnitsky (1954–1985).

Lipnitsky became friends with Pyotr Mamonov at school and attended concerts with Mamonov and Mamonov's younger brother, Aleksey Bortnichuk. In 1964, Lipnitsky was given his first Beatles record by Triloki Nath Kaul, the Indian Ambassador to the USSR, and became a fan of the band.

Lipnitsky studied journalism at Moscow State University. He became a specialist in jazz and began to be published in Soviet periodicals in 1975. He also became a figure in the underground music scene and dealt records. In the 1980s, he hosted informal concerts by underground musicians at his dacha in Nikolina Gora. His friends in the rock scene included Artemy Troitsky, Viktor Tsoi, Sergey Kuryokhin, Boris Grebenshchikov, Konstantin Kinchev, and Mike Naumenko.

In 1983, Lipnitsky, Mamonov, and Bortnichuk founded Zvuki Mu. Lipnitsky sold his art collection to buy the band's equipment and learned to play bass. Zvuki Mu's first performance took place in February 1984, at Lipnitsky and Mamonov's old school. Lipnitsky played bass in the group until 1990.

From 1990 to 1993, Lipnitsky and Joanna Stingray worked on the TV program Red Wave-21. In the 2000s, he hosted the rock program Yelovaya Submarina on Nostalgiya. From 2010, he hosted a program dedicated to Russian rock on the radio station Finam FM. He regularly performed in groups such as OtZvuki Mu and Grozdya Vinogradovy.

== Death ==
Lipnitsky died on 25 March 2021. While skating on the Moskva River near the village of Nikolina Gora, he fell through the ice and drowned. It is thought that at the time of his death he was trying to save his dog, who had fallen into the water. Lipnitsky's body was found in the Moskva on 27 March 2021. His funeral took place on 30 March 2021 at the Aksininsky cemetery in the village of Aksinino, near Moscow.
