= Evgenia Markova =

Film and entertainment executive (born 1982)

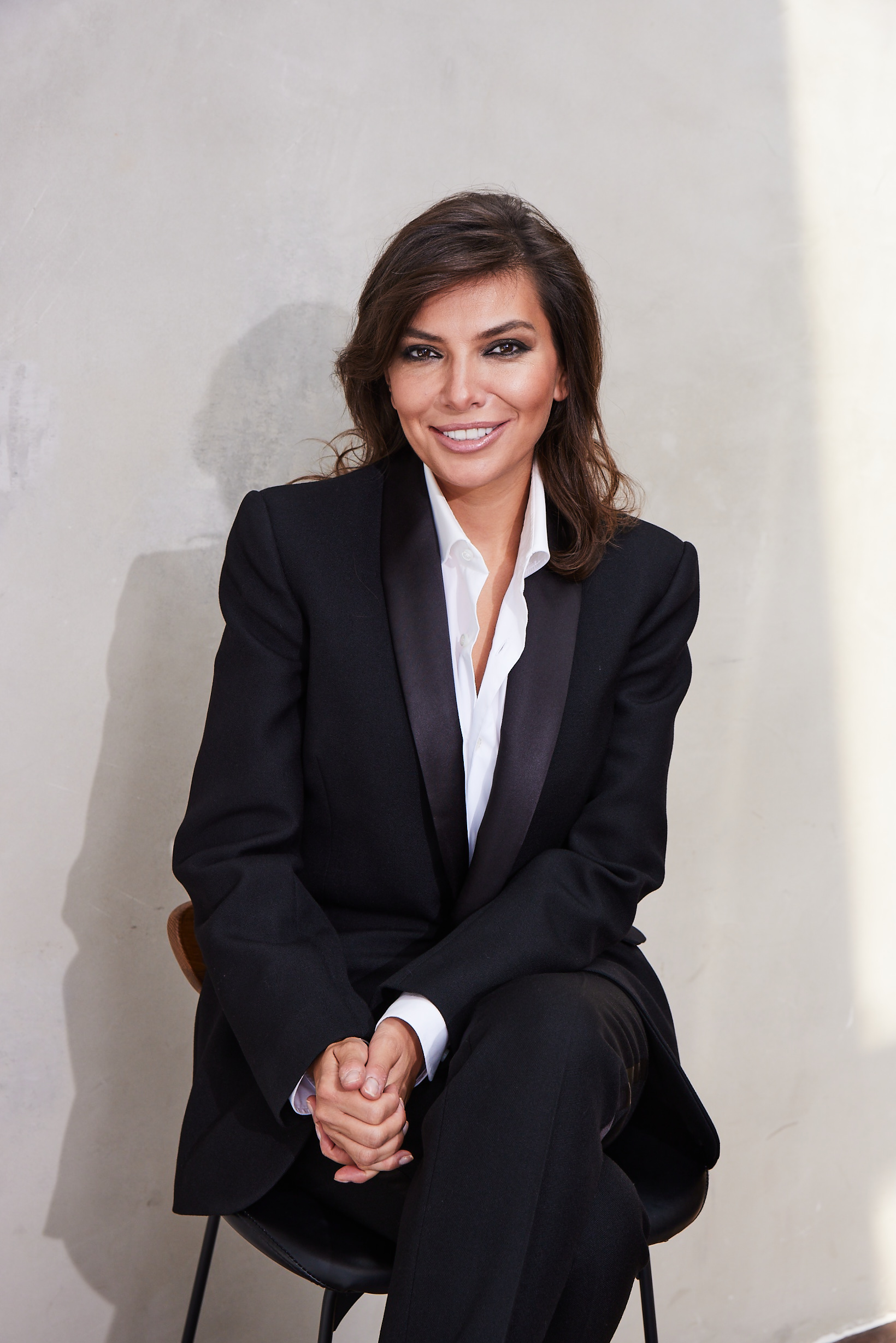
- Born: November 26, 1982 (age 42)
- Occupation(s): film and entertainment executive

Evgenia Markova (born November 26, 1982) is a film and entertainment executive and international creative industries expert. She is the former CEO of Roskino, an organization for promoting Russian films internationally (2020–2022), and the founder of JM Create and Connect, an international creative economy agency.

== Education ==
Markova holds an MBA in Marketing and Economics from a business school in Europe, and a Master of State Management from the Patrice Lumumba Peoples' Friendship University of Russia.

== Career ==
Markova began her professional career at Philips in 2006, where she led communications and business development. During her tenure, she set up a Healthcare Marketing Department for the Russia and CIS region, which helped Philips to establish its presence in the region.

From 2011 to 2012, Markova worked as the Vice President of Strategic Marketing in the healthcare and recreation division of Russian Railways. In this role, she oversaw the modernization of Soviet-era recreational facilities into modern spa clinics and health and wellness hotels.

In 2013, Markova took on the challenge of relaunching Librairie du Globe, a legendary Russian-language literature bookstore in Paris, France, which had been a symbol of the city's Slavic community since the Soviet era. In parallel she created a chain of Russian cultural centers internationally.

In 2014, she led the launch of a new chain of modern boutique hotels called "Dot on the Map" and "Winter's Dacha" in Karelia and the region northwest of St. Petersburg, promoting regional tourism in Russia.

In 2015–2018, Markova spearheaded the launch of anew chain of youth education and recreation centers called Mesto in small towns and remote communities in Russia, in order todevelop human capital in the Russian regions.

In 2019, Markova joined Expocontent, the Russian and CIS division of Reed MIDEM, a global leader in the organization of international entertainment trade events, as the Industry Relations Director. In this role, she coordinated the activities of Russian film producers in international film markets. Her efforts resulted in the successful gathering of 50 leading international film and content buyers for the first Russian film market in Moscow — the Key Buyers Event — which is now held annually.

Markova also joined the working group in 2019 to develop Russia's national rebate program for foreign film producers, which was adopted later that year.

In 2020, Markova was appointed as the CEO of Roskino. Under her leadership, films, TV series, and animation from Russian companies were positioned in world film markets under the single export brand—Russian Content Worldwide (RCW). In 2020, she launched the first online national film market for international buyers, becoming the first national film executive to do so during the pandemic. She converted weeks of Russian cinema into festivals with a systematic schedule, known as Russian Film Festivals (RFF), both online and offline. Additionally, she launched the "Focus on Festivals" program to support the submissions of independent Russian filmmakers at major international festivals and international scholarships for independent Russian producers. Markova also launched international co-production initiatives for Russian producers by launching the "Focus on Russia" and "Country Dialogues" programs in key international film markets. In recognition of her efforts, she received the Special Award of the 78th Venice International Film Festival for the development of cooperation in the field of cinematography in 2021. During her tenure, the worldwide geography of Russian film sales expanded by 25%.

At the end of April 2022, Markova stepped down as CEO of Roskino and joined the company's board of directors.

In 2022, Markova established JM Create and Connect agency, which is committed to developing the international partnerships in the field of creative industries and trade. The agency, operating in Southeast Asia, Middle East and CIS regions, already has a substantial portfolio of meaningful creative projects. The wide presence of creative products was organized by the agency during the Bangkok Design Week in Thailand, in February, 2023, with the purpose of developing ties between the Thai and Russian creative and business communities.

== Awards ==
- Special Award of the 78th Venice International Film Festival for the development of cooperation in the field of cinematography between Russia and Italy (2021)
- Shortlist of the first National award in the field of creative industries Russian Creative Awards in the nomination "Manager of the Year" (2021)
- Grand Prix of the National Award "Media Manager of Russia" (2021)
- Special Award of the Association of Film and Television Producers (APKiT) for Expanding Borders (2020)
