= Rosh Hashanah kibbutz =

Large prayer assemblage of Breslover Hasidim held on the Jewish New Year

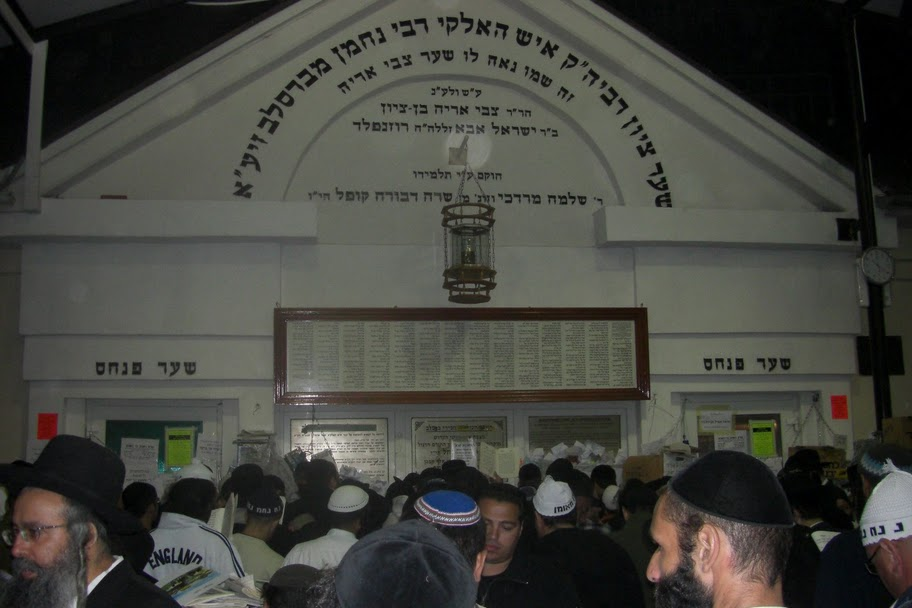
- Pilgrimage to the ohel of Rabbi Nachman of Breslov
- Status: Active
- Genre: Religious pilgrimage
- Date: Rosh Hashana
- Frequency: annually
- Location: Uman, Ukraine
- Founder: Rabbi Nachman of Breslov
- Participants: Breslov Hasidim
- Attendance: 40,000

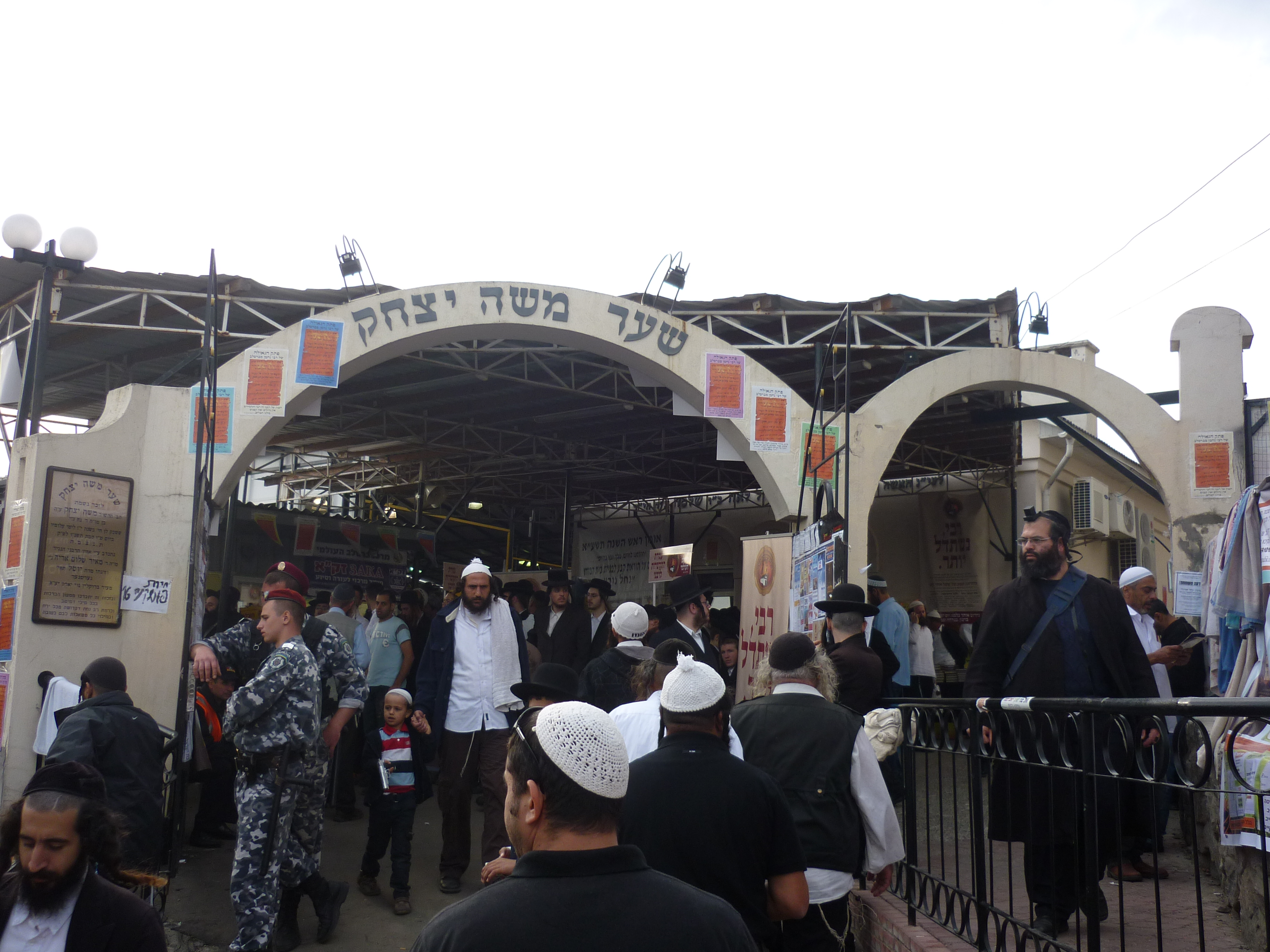
The kibbutz in 2010

The Rosh Hashanah kibbutz (Hebrew: קיבוץ; plural: kibbutzim: קיבוצים, "gathering" or "ingathering", also spelled as Rosh Hashana) is a large prayer assemblage of Breslover Hasidim held on the Jewish New Year. It specifically refers to the pilgrimage of tens of thousands of Hasidim to the city of Uman, Ukraine, (annually 40,000 Jews, nearly entirely men visit Uman) but also refers to sizable Rosh Hashana gatherings of Breslover Hasidim in other locales around the world. In recent years the pilgrimage to Uman has attracted Jewish seekers from all levels of religious observance and affiliation, including introducing Sephardic Jews to Hasidic spirituality. This has added to Breslov's position in the Baal teshuva movement of Jewish outreach.

Hasidic pilgrims and local Uman residents annually come into conflict.

== Rosh Hashana with Rebbe Nachman ==
The first Rosh Hashana kibbutz was initiated by Rebbe Nachman of Breslov during his lifetime. He strongly encouraged his followers to spend each Rosh Hashana with him in the town of Breslov. Hundreds of followers would gather for the holiday prayer service, festive meals, and special Torah lessons taught by the Rebbe. When asked why Rosh Hashana was so significant, Rebbe Nachman explained, "My Rosh Hashana is greater than everything. I cannot understand how it is that if my followers really believe in me, they are not all scrupulous about being with me for Rosh Hashana. No one should be missing! Rosh Hashana is my whole mission."

To one follower who said he preferred to visit the Rebbe on the Shabbat after Rosh Hashana, when he would have more space to pray, eat and sleep, the Rebbe replied, "Whether you eat or don't eat; whether you sleep or don't sleep; whether you pray or don't pray (i.e. with the proper concentration); just make sure to be with me for Rosh Hashana, no matter what!"

Elsewhere, Rebbe Nachman explained that traveling to a tzaddik on Rosh Hashana is a time-honored practice which helps to mitigate and "sweeten" Heavenly decrees at their source, at the beginning of the new year. The Rebbe also mentioned before the last Rosh Hashana of his life (in 1810) that there were people who were unable to achieve their tikkun (self-rectification) all year, nor was he able to help them then. On Rosh Hashana, however, these tikkunim could be effected.

In 1843, on the last Rosh Hashana of his own life, Nathan of Breslov ("Reb Noson"), the Rebbe's closest disciple and leader of the movement after the Rebbe's death, expounded on the meaning of Rebbe Nachman's Rosh Hashana in this way:

We see that on Rosh Hashana, Jews flock to the synagogue, to their leaders. They come from all the towns and villages to be together on Rosh Hashana. This is because the Jewish People are likened to a flock of sheep who gather around their shepherd. When the shepherd wishes to call his flock, he blows his horn. This is the reason for the blowing of the shofar on Rosh Hashana. The shepherd, the true tzaddik, is calling his "flock" together, seeking ways to help each one of them fulfill his destiny."

Rebbe Nachman died in October 1810 and was buried in the Uman cemetery. Afterwards, Reb Noson explained to the other Hasidim that Rebbe Nachman had stressed the importance of the Rosh Hashana kibbutz that year because he wanted them to continue to "be with him" for the holiday even after his death. He encouraged them to continue to gather at the Rebbe's gravesite in Uman every Rosh Hashana.

== Pilgrimage established by Reb Nosson ==
Reb Nosson arranged the first Rosh Hashana kibbutz the following year (1811) and continued to run it until his death in 1844. In the following decades, hundreds of Hasidim arrived annually from Ukraine, Belarus, Lithuania and Poland. So many joined the pilgrimage, in fact, that the local synagogue was unable to accommodate them. Fearing that people would stop attending the kibbutz, Reb Noson acquired a property, applied for a government permit, raised funds and oversaw the construction of a large Breslover synagogue in Uman in 1834. Also defined as a kloyz, it housed the annual Rosh Hashana kibbutz through the 1930s.

Reb Noson once said, "Even if the road to Uman were paved with knives, I would crawl there — just so I could be with my Rebbe on Rosh Hashanah!"

In each generation, the most pious representatives of the movement were honored with leading the prayer services at the annual Rosh Hashana kibbutz. They included: Nachman Chazan, Abraham Sternhartz, Levi Yitzchok Bender, Michel Dorfman, and Itzel Korsinski.

The annual Rosh Hashana pilgrimage effectively redirected the focus of Breslover Hasidut from the town of Breslov to the town of Uman. Today, the town of Breslov is considered a side-trip for visitors to Ukraine, as the only sites of interest to Breslover Hasidim there are the graves of Reb Nosson and other Breslover figures.

== Pilgrimage in the Soviet Union ==
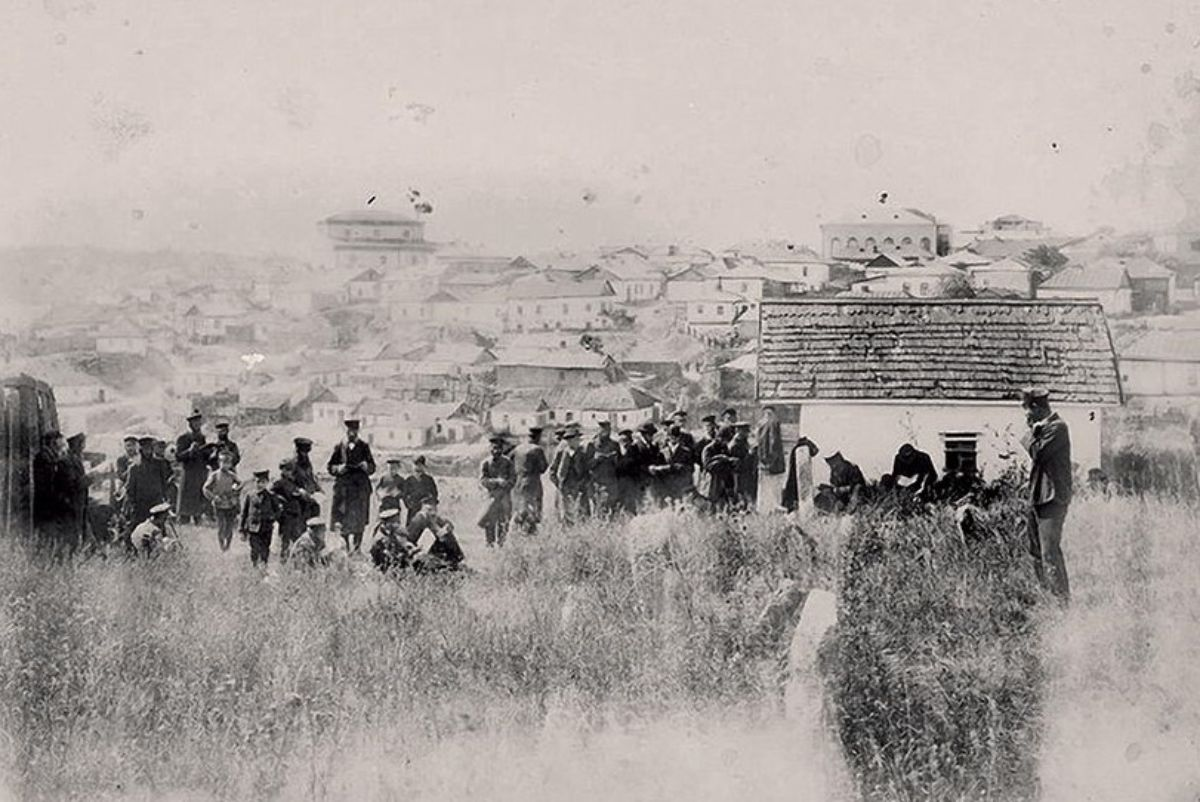
The tomb of Rabbi Nachman, a photo from the early 20th century

The Rosh Hashana pilgrimage ground to a halt with the Bolshevik Revolution of 1917, which sealed the border between Russia and Poland. Uman became a "closed city" and foreigners were strictly prohibited from entering. Rabbi Yitzchok Breiter, a Breslover Hasid in Poland who drew thousands of his countrymen closer to the Hasidut in the 1920s and 1930s, established a Rosh Hashana kibbutz in Lublin for their benefit. Hasidim who emigrated to Israel established Rosh Hashana kibbutzim in Jerusalem and in Meron (the latter at the gravesite of Rabbi Shimon bar Yochai), which continue to this day. Later, other Rosh Hashana kibbutzim were established in New York City and in Manchester, England.

Shmuel Horowitz, a native of Safed, Mandate Palestine, was the last foreign citizen to sneak across the Polish border into the Soviet Union (Note: Ukraine was part of the Soviet Union from 1920 until Ukraine declared its independence from the Soviet Union on 24 August 1991.) around 1929. He participated in three Rosh Hashana kibbutzim in Uman before he was discovered and arrested for illegal entry. After spending three months in a Soviet prison, Horowitz was released with the intervention of the Chief Rabbi of Mandate Palestine, Abraham Isaac Kook, and returned in 1933.

Despite the Communist ban on public prayer gatherings, Breslover Hasidim in the Soviet Union continued to gather clandestinely every Rosh Hashana during the 1920s and 1930s. In 1934, the Soviets ostensibly granted permission for 28 Hasidim to travel to Uman for Rosh Hashana. In fact, it was a ruse to discover their identities - 16 were murdered while still in Uman and 12 were exiled to Siberia. Only four of the exiles survived. In 1936, the authorities shut down the kloyz built by Reb Noson and turned it into a metalworking factory.

The Rosh Hashana kibbutz was relocated to a rented apartment in 1936 and 1937. The last kibbutz before World War II was held in 1938. Twenty-seven Hasidim risked their lives to participate in this gathering.

World War II and the Holocaust decimated the numbers of Breslover Hasidim living in the Soviet Union.

In 1947, the city of Uman planned to raze the cemetery and build a housing project in its stead. Hasidim of Breslov, led by Zanvil Lubarski, mobilized to buy the property. With the assistance of Chabad Hasidim from Lviv the property was purchased from the city. Lubarski then located the gravesite by finding the wooden beams that were part of the structure.

The Rosh Hashana pilgrimage resumed on a drastically smaller scale in 1948, when 11 Hasidim independently traveled from cities throughout the Soviet Union to Uman for Rosh Hashana. From then until the 1970s, when most of the remaining Hasidim were permitted to emigrate to Israel, only between 9 and 13 Hasidim braved the annual trip. They were often forced to change the location of their prayer services from year to year to escape discovery by the authorities.

Beginning in the 1950s, Michel Dorfman in Moscow became the official organizer of the Rosh Hashana kibbutz. Hasidim from throughout the Soviet Union would contact him for details about each year's event, and he wrote letters to others, encouraging them to continue this practice of being with Rebbe Nachman for Rosh Hashana despite the long journey and the threat of government surveillance.

In the 1960s, when the majority of Hasidim in the Breslover movement resided outside the Soviet Union, Rebbe Nachman's gravesite began to turn from being an internal Russian destination to an international one. A young New York Hasid named Gedaliah Fleer was the first foreign citizen to enter Uman without permission in 1963, with Dorfman's help. The Soviets would only issue tourist visas to larger cities like Kiev and Odessa, not to Uman. Fleer returned to Uman in 1965 to join the Rosh Hashana kibbutz with 12 other Soviet Hasidim. Fleer pretended to be from the Soviet Republic of Georgia and that he did not speak Yiddish or Russian in order to protect his identity. Had the participants known that a foreign citizen was in their midst, they would have quit the kibbutz immediately.

From the 1960s until the end of the Cold War 1989, several hundred American and Israeli Hasidim made their way to Uman, both legally and illegally, to pray at the grave of Rebbe Nachman. Sometimes the government issued individual tourist visas to Uman, but no one was allowed to stay in the city overnight. In 1975, however, Rabbi Herschel Wasilski, the official American representative of Breslover Hasidut, received permission to conduct a minyan at the Rebbe's gravesite on the eve of Rosh Hashana with 11 other men and spent the holiday in the city. In 1988, glasnost and continuing international pressure finally forced the Soviet government to permit 250 foreign citizens to stay in Uman over Rosh Hashana.

== Pilgrimage since the end of the Cold War ==
In 1989 the end of the Cold War opened the gates entirely. Between 700 and 900 Hasidim gathered in Uman for Rosh Hashana 1989. In 1990, 2,000 Hasidim attended. Large factory sites were called into service to house the crowd. The numbers have continued to grow apace. The Rosh Hashana kibbutz in Uman surpassed the 10,000-person mark in 2000. In 2005, approximately 20,000 men and boys from all countries and all backgrounds converged on the town for the annual event. In 2008, the numbers reached 25,000. In 2018 40,000 Jews, nearly entirely men, visit Uman.

Coordinators of the Rosh Hashana kibbutz fly in fully catered, kosher holiday meals for all participants, temporary lodgings, an infirmary and emergency medical technicians from Israel.

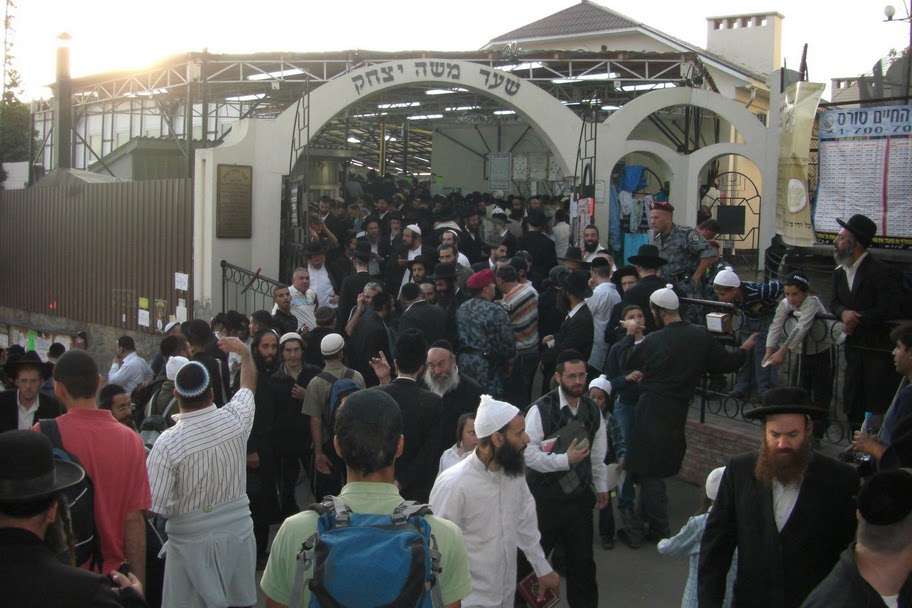
Hasidim make a pilgrimage to the grave of Rabbi Nachman

Despite the dormitory-style accommodations, the gathering is infused with much spiritual devotion and unity of purpose. Besides the communal prayer services, Torah classes are conducted in Yiddish, Hebrew, English, Russian, and French. A visual highlight of the Rosh Hashana kibbutz is the Tashlikh ceremony, held on the afternoon of the holiday. Thousands of Hasidim, dressed entirely in white, sing and dance through the streets of Uman as they make their way down to the river to perform this holiday ritual.

In September 2014, a statement issued by the association of Breslov rabbis called on women to cease visiting the gravesite because the presence of women could detract from the sacredness of prayers said by male worshippers. According to the statement the increasing presence of women has created a "huge spiritual interruption." Others defend their position stating that the enormous volume of male worshippers would mitigate the possibility of proper separation of the genders. They say that this separation is necessary to stay focused on the sacred mission of the pilgrimage.

In recent years there has been frequent friction between the predominantly Israeli Hasidic pilgrims and Uman locals, many of whom resent the cordoning off of neighborhoods by police and the internal trade that has developed among pilgrims. Sources at Ben Gurion airport have also complained about Hasidic pilgrim “passengers who arrive to the plane drunk, or even drugged". Anshel Pfeffer reported (for Haaretz) in 2018 that an Israeli diplomat told him that "roughly only half of those who come to Uman do so for religious reasons, and the other half are simply the dregs who come to get drunk", despite this Pfeffer himself did not find any evidence of prostitution among Uman's Pilgrims. In September 2010, ten Hasidic pilgrims were deported back to Israel and banned from Ukraine.

In June 2024, Ukraine declared its stance on the Electronic Travel Authorization (ETA-IL) system implemented by Israel, stating that it considers the ETA-IL to be a violation of the existing visa-free agreement between the two nations that had been in place since 2010. In response to Israel's decision, Ukraine announced it would implement similar pre-approval requirements for Israeli citizens. This reciprocal action was confirmed by the Ukrainian Embassy in Israel on June 20, 2024. These measures are intended to mirror the additional requirements imposed by Israel, including the requirement for visitors to the Rosh Hashana kibbutz.

In January 2025, 90 Patriot air defense interceptors were transferred from Israel to Ukraine by the United States. Israeli officials denied they were supplying weapons to Ukraine but were only returning the system to the US and are unaware of their fate. However, Axios reported Netanyahu had approved their transfer in September 2024 in return for allowing the annual Uman pilgrimage.

== Controversy ==
Personnel of Ben Gurion airport, other Israeli tourists and El Al pilots have complained about pilgrims abusing drugs and hard liquor and harassing fellow passengers to Ukraine. Common complaints from Uman residents relate to the loud noise, singing, rowdiness, widespread drinking, drug use, and fighting the pilgrims cause. Locals have also complained about the cordoning off of neighborhoods by police and the internal trade that has developed among pilgrims.

Heavy alcoholic drinking and cannabis smoking is prevalent amongst the pilgrims, many of them young men, with some describing it as a party event. Participants have been seen taking LSD on the pilgrimage. Dancing in the streets to trance music is common and the event has been likened to the Burning Man festival.

The pilgrimage has led to several clashes over the years. In September 2010, several cases of violence and riots broke out among pilgrims after members of the Evangelical Church arrived from Odesa to preach their faith, leading to 10 pilgrims being deported. A few days later, ten pilgrims were deported back to Israel and banned from Ukraine for five years for disrupting public order and causing bodily harm to citizens. At the end of September 2010, an Israeli was stabbed and killed in an altercation that broke out following the vandalism of a car owned by Jews. Allegedly, his stabbing was a retaliation for the stabbing and wounding of a local (Ukrainian) by an Israeli.

In September 2013, three Israeli police officers were deported after getting involved in a bar brawl during the Rosh Hashanah gathering in Uman. In the 2014 pilgrimage, organizers were fined $15,000 by the city of Uman for illegally operating a "tent city" to house 2,500 pilgrims. The controversy is the subject of the 2015 documentary film, The Dybbuk. A Tale of Wandering Souls. In 2015, pilgrims staying in a residential tower began tossing rocks and bottles from above onto a car, and when at one point a local policeman's hat was knocked off, police with German Shepherds were called to scatter the crowd.

In 2010, an Israeli police officer sent to monitor security commented "people get drunk and act crazy in the streets, go out to pubs and hit on women and harass them. They do all types of things that they would never do in Israel, but they come out here and feel like they can do it." Anshel Pfeffer reported for Haaretz in 2018 that an Israeli diplomat told him that "roughly only half of those who come to Uman do so for religious reasons, and the other half are simply the dregs who come to get drunk, take drugs and visit prostitutes," Pfeffer himself did not find any evidence of prostitution in Uman.

After the outbreak of war between Russia and Ukraine in February 2022, authorities in Ukraine warned against Chasidic pilgrims coming to Uman. The Ukrainian embassy in Israel issued a statement saying: “When the echoes of the Russian enemy explosions on Ukraine don’t stop, we must take care of ourselves. Please, avoid coming to Uman on Rosh Hashanah and pray that peace will return to Ukraine and the blessed pilgrimage will be renewed.”

Numbers increased over subsequent years, with an estimated 35,000 pilgrims coming to Uman in 2024.
