= Yekaterina Mtsituridze =

Russian television presenter

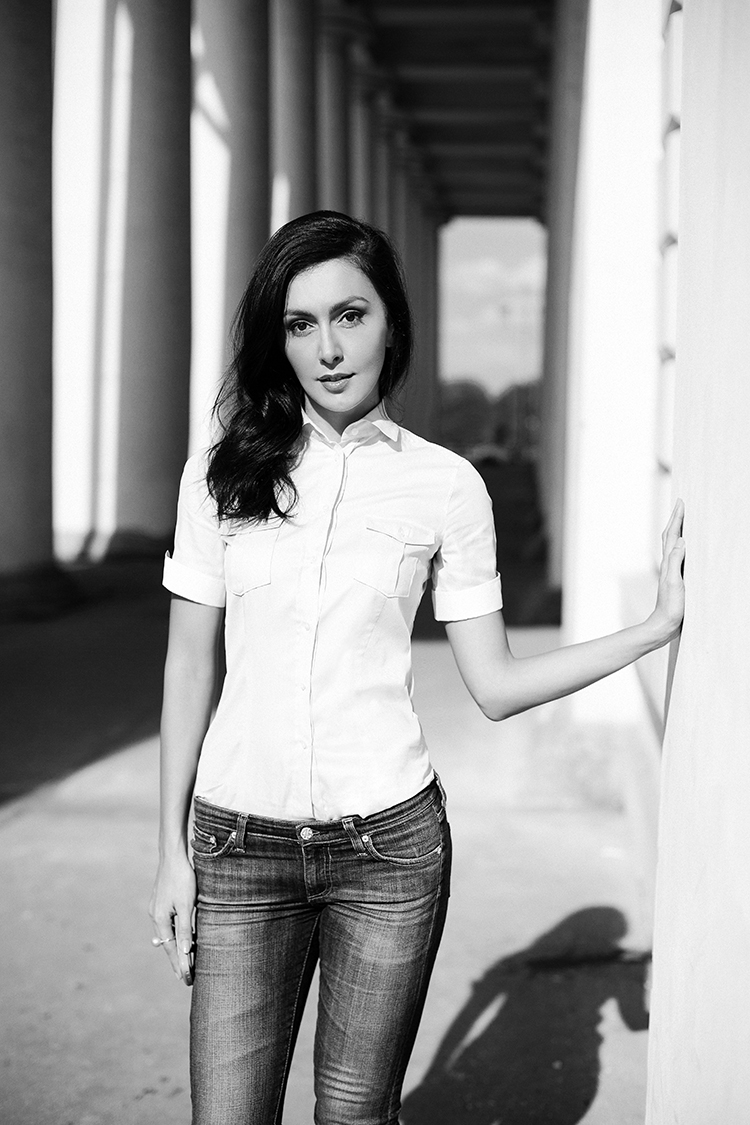
- Born: Yekaterina Akakievna Mtsituridze; 10 January 1972 (age 54); Tbilisi, Georgia
- Citizenship: Moscow
- Occupations: film critic journalist tv presenter
- Writing career
- Years active: 1991–present

Yekaterina Akakievna Mtsituridze (Russian: Екатерина Акакиевна Мцитуридзе, Georgian: ეკატერინე აკაკის ასული მწითურიძე; born 10 January 1972, Tbilisi, Georgian SSR) is a Russian television presenter, film critic and film expert of Georgian origin.

Former editor-in-chief of Variety Russia, head of Roskino (since 2011), the Channel One Russia movie expert, author of the concept and general producer of St. Petersburg International Media Forum. Member of the Union of Cinematographers of the Russian Federation, a member of the Union of Journalists of Russia and the International Union of Journalists, a member of the Association of the International Film Press FIPRESCI, an academician of the National Academy of Cinematographic Arts and Sciences of Russia, Master of Historical Sciences.

== Biography ==
She was born on 10 January 1972 in Tbilisi (Georgian SSR, USSR). In she graduated from the History and Cinema Science Department of the Tbilisi State University. Since 1994 she lives in Moscow.

Member of the jury of contest Un Certain Regard in 2008 Cannes Film Festival, 1st and 2nd Moscow Jewish Film Festivals

In October 2017 Mtsituridze told the press in detail that she twice, in 2003 at the Berlin Film Festival and in 2004 at the Venice Film Festival, was sexually harassed by Hollywood producer Harvey Weinstein.

In March 2022, Yekaterina signed a collective appeal of film critics, film historians and film journalists of Russia against Russian invasion of Ukraine.
