= Fantastic Journey to Oz =

Fantastic Journey to OZ
- Theatrical release poster
- Directed by: Vladimir Toropchin; Fyodor Dmitriev; Darina Schmidt
- Screenplay by: Aleksandr Boyarsky
- Based on: Urfin Jus and His Wooden Soldiers by Alexander Volkov
- Produced by: Sergei Selyanov; Anton Zlatopolskiy; Aleksandr Boyarsky
- Starring: Konstantin Khabensky; Dmitri Dyuzhev; Sergey Shnurov
- Edited by: Sergei Glezin
- Music by: Mikhail Chertischev
- Production companies: Melnitsa Animation Studio; CTB
- Distributed by: Russia-1
- Release date: 20 April 2017
- Running time: 91 minutes
- Country: Russia
- Language: Russian
- Budget: ₽345 million
- Box office: $5.9 million

Fantastic Journey to OZ (Russian: Урфин Джюс и его деревянные солдаты, romanized: Urfin Jus i ego derevyannye soldaty, transl. Urfin Jus and His Wooden Soldiers) is a 2017 Russian animated film based on the novel Urfin Jus and his Wooden Soldiers by Alexander Volkov.

The film was directed by Vladimir Toropchin, Fyodor Dmitriev and Darina Schmidt. It is the first animated film from Melnitsa Animation Studio made using computer animation.

The premiere took place on 20 April 2017.

A sequel, Fantastic Return to Oz, was released on 24 October 2019.

== Plot ==
Long ago, a young girl named Milena meets a boy named Urfin Jus, who offers him a trinket, but he rejects it and leaves.

Years later, Urfin discovers he has magic powers with magic powder animating objects, which were used on his wooden puppet clown and bear rug. He builds wooden soldiers as the puppet suggests. Urfin and the soldiers then arrive at the land of the Munchkins, where he announces his usurpment of the land and his arrival to the Emerald City. Meanwhile, a young girl named Ellie (Note: Named Dorothy in the English dub.) with her dog Toto are teleported to the land of the Munchkins with a pair of silver slippers. After taking out most of Urfin's soldiers, the pair is greeted by the Munchkins, who explain what happened here. She and Toto walk into the yellow brick road as they embark on a journey to the Emerald City. En route, they meet Milena, who gives the trinket to Ellie to give it to Urfin. Later during their journey, they are abducted by an ogre and taken to his hut. There, the two, along with the Cowardly Lion, end up in a cave underneath the hut. While exploring, the lion recalls their story to the team of how her grandmother and the team got chased by fangthers before they jump off a cliff.

Meanwhile, Urfin and his army arrive at the Emerald City, and, after storming its castle, Ruf Bilan informs the Scarecrow that he wants to become the master of Urfin, before imprisoning him. A crow warns Urfin of the Tin Woodman's arrival to the Emerald City. They then make a clone of the Scarecrow to fool him. When he reaches the Emerald City, the Woodman is tricked into being imprisoned and incapacitated by the wooden clown puppet and the Scarecrow clone. Afterward, Urfin takes the key to Gingema's book from a reluctant Scarecrow. Ellie reaches the Emerald City, and sneaks into the real Scarecrow's prison cell to reconcile, and shares about their friendship. After Ellie leaves, the Tin Woodman and the Scarecrow escape prison with the crow's help.

Ellie accidentally gives the slippers to the Scarecrow clone, who delivers them to Urfin. He imprisons Ellie, and summons a giant robot to terrorize the Emerald City. In the chaos, Ellie shows the trinket to Urfin, which Milena offered him long ago. Ellie defeats the robot with her slippers, banishing it to an unidentified location. The citizens celebrate Ellie on saving the Emerald City, and she manages to return home.

== Cast ==
=== Russian Dub ===
- Konstantin Khabensky – Urfin Jus
- Ekaterina Gorokhovskaya – Ellie
- Sergey Shnurov – General Lan Pirot
- Dmitri Dyuzhev – Topotun the Bear
- Andrey Lyovin – Totoshka
- Yuliya Rudina – Eot Ling the Clown
- Sergey Dyachkov – Scarecrow
- Valery Solovyov – Tin Woodman
- Valery Kukhareshin – The Cowardly Lion
- Aleksandr Boyarsky – Ogre
- Dmitry Bykovsky-Romashov – Sabretooth Tiger
- Mikhail Chernyak – crow Kaggi-Karr
- Oleg Kulikovich – Ruf Bilan

=== English Dub ===
- Marc Thompson – Urfin Jus
- Alyson Leigh Rosenfeld - Ellie (as Dorothy)
- Tyler Bunch – General Lan Pirot, Ogre (credited as H.D. Quinn)
- Erica Schroeder - Totoshka, Grandma
- Haven Paschall - Eot Ling the Clown
- Billy Bob Thompson – Scarecrow
- Tom Wayland – Tin Woodman
- Mike Pollock – The Cowardly Lion, Ruf Bilan
- Kate Bristol - Crown

== Accolade ==
Award	Date of ceremony	Category	Recipient(s)	Result	Ref(s)
Marbella International Film Festival	9 July 2018	Animation	Vladimir Toropchin	Nominated	

== Sequels ==
Fantastic Return to Oz: a 2019 Russian computer animated film.
