= The Dybbuk. A Tale of Wandering Souls =

2015 film by Krzysztof Kopczyński

- Directed by: Krzysztof Kopczyński
- Written by: Krzysztof Kopczyński
- Produced by: Krzysztof Kopczyński; David Herdies; Gennady Kofman; Danil Vulickyy
- Release date: May 31, 2015 (Krakow Film Festival)
- Running time: 86/53 minutes
- Countries: Poland; Sweden; Ukraine
- Languages: Ukrainian; Hebrew; Russian; Yiddish

The Dybbuk. A Tale of Wandering Souls is a 2015 documentary film by Polish filmmaker and director Krzysztof Kopczyński. The film tells the story of a conflict between Orthodox Jews and Ukrainian far-right activists in Uman, a city in Ukraine, just before the 2013 Euromaidan protests.

Every year, 30,000 Hasidim journey to Uman to celebrate the Jewish New Year at the gravesite of their holy leader Rebbe Nachman. Meanwhile, a Ukrainian far-right group erects a cross at the site of Hasidic prayers and builds a monument to Cossacks who slaughtered thousands of Jews and Poles in 1768 during a national rebellion.

The film opened the 55th Krakow Film Festival, where it received the Silver Hobby-Horse for the Director of the Best Documentary Film. The prize was awarded "for courage and non-conformity in showing an extremely complicated and universal problem of reciprocal intolerance when facing the dangers of the contemporary world." On 6th Odesa International Film Festival the film received FIPRESCI prize for a feature-length film.
