= Dmitri Dyuzhev =

Russian actor and singer (born 1978)

Dmitri Dyuzhev Дмитрий Дюжев
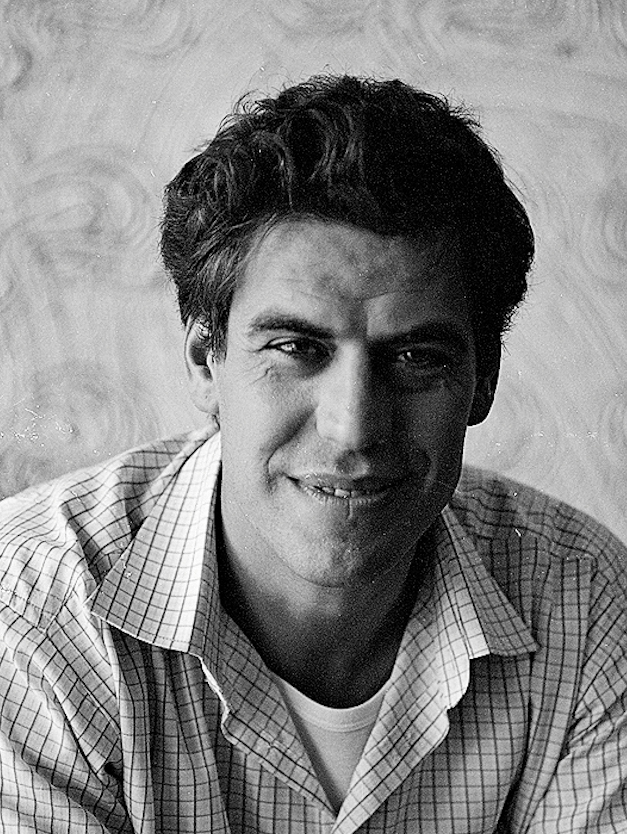
- Dyuzhev in 2011
- Born: July 9, 1978 (age 48); Astrakhan, Russian SFSR, Soviet Union
- Occupations: Actor, singer
- Years active: 2000–present
- Spouse: Tatiana Dyuzheva
- Children: 1

Dmitri Petrovich Dyuzhev (Russian: Дмитрий Петрович Дюжев; born July 9, 1978) is a Russian film and stage actor and singer.

== Early life ==
Was born on July 9, 1978, in Astrakhan, in the family of actor Petr Dyuzhev and Ludmila Dyuzheva. In 1995 he graduated the "School of Gifted Children" and entered the GITIS (Directing Department, acting group, workshop by Mark Zakharov). Dmitri played Donevan in Boris Godunov. Rehearsals coincided with the shooting of the television series Bayazet, in which Dyuzhev was invited for one of the main roles, but Dmitri declined to act in the series.

== Career ==
Since 2006, Dmitry Dyuzhev is an actor of the Moscow Art Theatre. In 2015, Dmitry Dyuzhev made his debut as a theater director, staging the play Bench on the play of A. Gelman.

== Political activity ==
In May 2026, Dyuzhev announced his intention to run for a seat in the State Duma in the September 2026 legislative election. He officially filed an application to participate in the primaries of the pro-Kremlin United Russia party in Moscow. During his campaign, he expressed support for Vladimir Putin and the Russian invasion of Ukraine, promising to advocate for benefits and job placements for war veterans. He also proposed launching a "tour landing" of theater and philharmonic artists to small towns and villages.

The primaries concluded on May 31, 2026, and the results were published in early June. Dyuzhev received 2,701 votes, placing 32nd out of 300 candidates in Moscow. The leader of the Moscow list, Pyotr Tolstoy, received over 224,000 votes. Following the results, Dyuzhev commented that he considered his 32nd place a "good result" and thanked those who voted for him, adding that he hoped to prepare more thoroughly in the future. As he did not win the primary, his name was not included on the United Russia party list for the September 2026 elections.

== Personal life ==
On February 14, 2008, Dmitri married Tatiana Dyuzheva in a traditional Russian Orthodox ceremony held on July 20, 2008. They have one son.

In January 2023, Ukraine imposed sanctions on Dmitri for his support of Russian invasion of Ukraine. In February 2023 Canada sanctioned Dmitri Dyuzhev.

== Selected filmography ==
=== Films ===
- Razborka v Manile (English title: Showdown in Manila) (Russia/Philippines, 2016) as Victor
- Beremennyy (English title: The Pregnant) (Russia, 2011) as Sergey Dobrolyubov
- Delo bylo na Kubani (Russia, 2011)
- Utomlyonnye solntsem 2: Tsitadel (English title: Burnt by the Sun 2: Citadel) (Russia, 2011) as Banya
- Lyubov' i zoloto (Russia, 2010) as Archaeologist
- Hamlet. XXI Century (Russia, 2010) as Claudius
- Blizkiy vrag (English title: Close Enemy) (Russia, 2010) as Oleg
- Moskva, ya lyublyu tebya! (Russia, 2010)
- Utomlyonnye solntsem 2: Predstoyanie (English title: Burnt by the Sun 2: Exodus) (Russia, 2010) as Banya
- Kanikuly strogogo rezhima (English title: High Security Vacation) (Russia, 2009) as Evgeni Koltsov
- Rokery (Russia, 2009)
- Obratnaya storona (English title: The Other Side) (Kazakhstan, 2009) as Bek
- Ischeznovenie (Russia/Ukraine, 2008)
- Zolotaya rybka (Russia, 2008) as Elvis
- Tarif Novogodniy (English title: The New Year's Rate Plan) (Russia, 2008) as Voditel' benzovoza
- Rozygrysh (Russia, 2008) as Aleksandr Ivanovich
- Svoj-Chuzhoj (Russia, 2008) as Matvej
- Kuka (Russia, 2007) as Roma
- Puteshestvie s domashnimi zhivotnymi (English title: Travelling with Pets) (Russia, 2007) as Sergei
- Antidur (Russia, 2007) as Vel'mishev
- Den pobedy (Russia, 2006) as Aleksei Privalov
- Mne ne bol'no (Russia, 2006) as Oleg
- Ostrov (English title: The Island) (Russia, 2006) as otets Iov
- Letuchaya mysh' (Ukraine, 2005) as Al'fred
- Mechtat ne vredno (English title: To Dream Harmlessly) (Russia, 2005) as Andrian
- Zhmurki (English title: Dead Man's Bluff) (Russia, 2005) as Simon
- Russkoe (Russia, 2004) as Slavka
- Vsadnik po imeni Smert (English title: The Rider Named Death) (Russia, 2004) as Azef
- Slushatel (Russia, 2004) as Sidyachko
- Kovcheg (Russia, 2002)
- Aprel' (Russia, 2002)
- Poisons or the World History of Poisoning (Яды, или Всемирная история отравлений, 2001) as Dr. Edme Costa
- 24 chasa (English title: 24 Hours) (Russia, 2000)

=== Television ===
- Goodbye (Russia, 2024) as Joe Biden and Ivan
- The Road to Calvary (Russia, 2017) as Mamont Dalsky
- Osvoboditeli (Russia, 2010) as himself
- Verbnoe voskresen'e (Russia, 2009) as Artur
- Ty - eto ya (Russia, 2006)
- Karambol' (Russia, 2006) as Slutskij
- Schastlivyy (Russia, 2005) as Nikita
- Ohotniki za ikonami (Russia, 2005) as Moshennik Rubl'
- Samara-gorodok (Russia, 2004) as Nikita Khabarov
- Komanda (Russia, 2004) as Mark Levin
- Stilet (Russia, 2003) as Security guard at the casino
- Na uglu, u Patriarshih 3 (Russia, 2003)
- Rodina zhdet (English title: In the Service of My Country) (Russia, 2003) as Nikolai Kavchugin
- Svetskie hroniki (Russia, 2002) as Photographer Petechka
- Brigada (English title: Law of the Lawless) (Russia, 2002) as Kosmos
- Marsh Turetskogo (Russia, 2000)

=== Voice ===
- Fantastic Journey to OZ (2017) as bear Topotun
- Monstry protiv prisheltsev (English title: Monsters vs Aliens) (USA, 2009) as The Missing Link
- Pro Fedota-streltsa, udalogo molodtsa (Russia, 2008) as General
- Lyagushachij raj (Russia, 2007)

=== Theatre ===
Moscow Art Theatre (2006–present):

- 2006 - Primadonny
- 2009 - Dvoryanskoe gnezdo (English title: Home of the Gentry)
