= MD&C Pavlov =

Soviet-Russian hip hop artist

Alexey Vladimirovich Pavlov (Russian: Алексе́й Влади́мирович Па́влов, born 8 February 1968), best known under his stage name MD&C Pavlov, is a Russian hip hop performer and one of the first MC's in the Soviet Union. He is cited as being "the godfather of Russian funk" and one of the pioneers of Russian rap.

== Biography ==
While he was originally a drummer for a Soviet rock band Zvuki Mu, Pavlov heard rap music from bootlegged tapes in possession of a Cuban student at a Russian university in 1984. He then heard more hip-hop when touring the United States in 1989 with his rock band and immediately was infatuated with the genre and culture. When he returned to the USSR, he began rapping in Moscow clubs and discos. His raps were mostly in English with Russian, Sanskrit and nonsense syllables, based on jazz scat syllables, all mixed together. He used an American hip-hop style and would only perform with black dancers and performers, because he believed the genre was a black genre. He also avoided political topics and emphasized the sound of words over their meaning. Because of this, government officials did not perceive him as a threat and did not seriously attempt to censor him. Although he succeeded in spreading rap further throughout the USSR and was one of the first rappers in Russia, Pavlov's popularity decreased as during the decline of the USSR. He now claims he has been forgotten as a Russian rap icon, while other American and Russian groups from the same era, like Bad Balance, are given more credit for spreading and sparking the genre.
