= The Wizard of the Emerald City =

1939 novel by Alexander Melentyevich Volkov

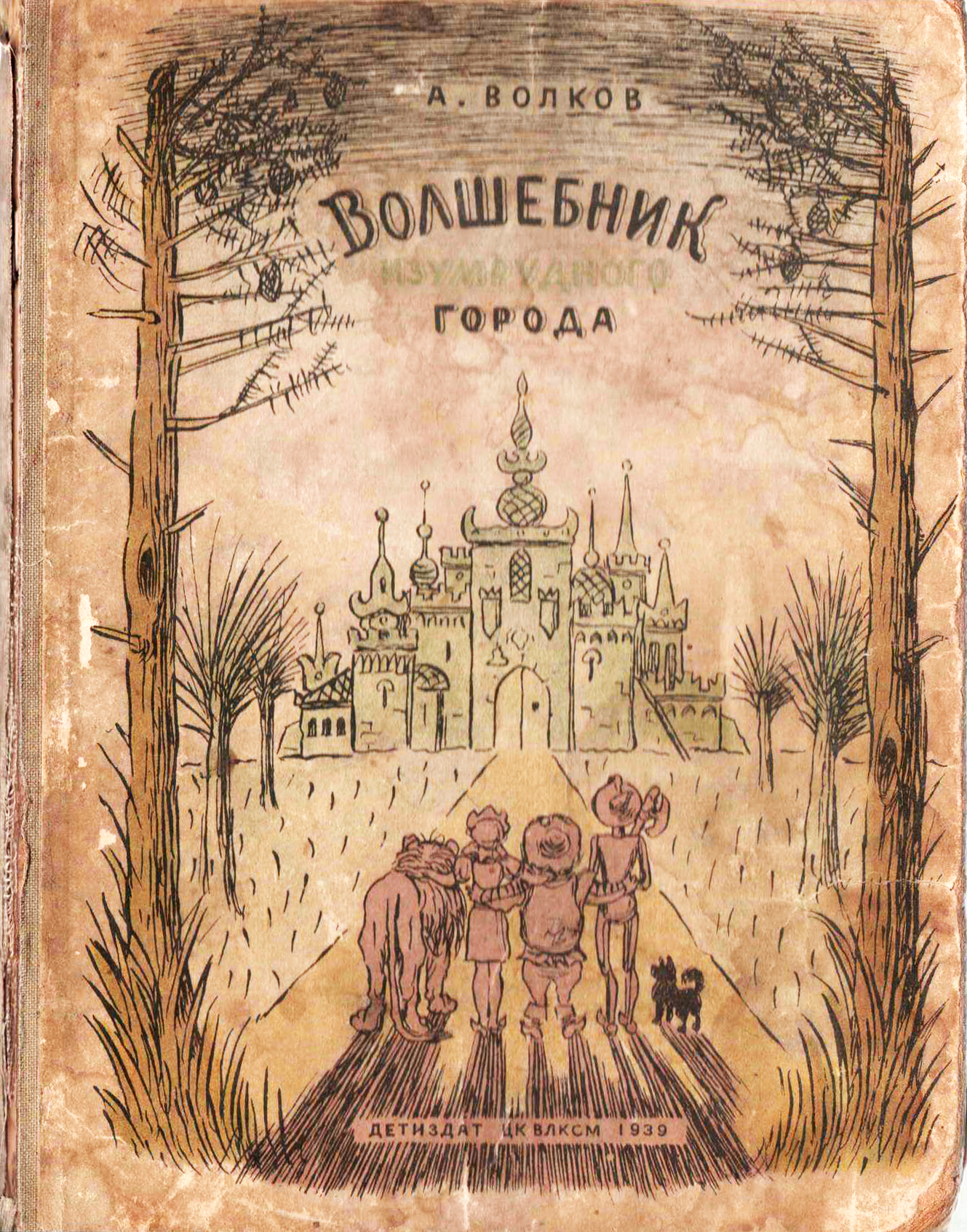
- Author: Alexander Volkov
- Original title: Волшебник Изумрудного Города
- Illustrator: Leonid Vladimirsky
- Language: Russian
- Genre: Fantasy/Children's book
- Publication date: 1939, 1959 (revised)
- Publication place: Soviet Union
- Media type: Print
- Followed by: Urfin Jus and his Wooden Soldiers (1963)

The Wizard of the Emerald City (Russian: Волшебник Изумрудного Города) is a 1939 children's novel by Russian writer Alexander Melentyevich Volkov. The book is a liberal translation of L. Frank Baum's The Wonderful Wizard of Oz. Baum's name is sometimes credited in the book (in the appendix by Volkov, which is found in some editions, where Volkov describes the origins of his book). The names of most characters are changed, some elements of Baum's novel are removed, and some new elements are added.

Volkov's Magic Land series, as it was called, was translated into many languages and was popular with children all over the Eastern Bloc. Volkov's version of Oz seems to be better known than Baum's in Russia, China, and the former East Germany. Five sequels were written by Volkov in the 1960s and 70s.

The books in the series have been translated into English by Peter L. Blystone, and were published by Red Branch Press in three volumes (two books per volume) in 1991, 1993, and 2007. A revised edition of the first two-book volume was published in 2010.

== Characters ==
Name	Russian	Baum equivalent
Ellie Smith	Элли Смит	Dorothy Gale
Totoshka (Little Toto)	Тотошка	Toto
Strashila	Страшила	Scarecrow
Iron Lumberjack	Железный Дровосек	Tin Woodman
Cowardly Lion	Трусливый Лев	Cowardly Lion
James Goodwin	Джеймс Гудвин	The Wizard
Bastinda, the Witch of Violet Land	Бастинда	Wicked Witch of the West
Villina, the Sorceress of Yellow Land	Виллина	Locusta the Good Witch of the North
Stella, the Sorceress of Rose Land	Стелла	Glinda the Good Witch of the South
Gingema, the Witch of Blue Land	Гингема	Wicked Witch of the East
Din Gior	Дин Гиор	Soldier with the Green Whiskers
Faramant	Фарамант	Guardian of the Gates
Ramina	Рамина	Queen of the Field Mice

== Notable differences ==
The following are notable differences between The Wizard of the Emerald City and the original book The Wonderful Wizard of Oz:

- In the original book, the characters at one point have to run away from half-tiger, half-bear beasts called Kalidahs. In Volkov's version, the Kalidahs are replaced with saber-toothed tigers.
- The Fighting Trees and the China Country are omitted in Volkov's version. Instead, the main characters have to cross a river by making a raft, and things go awry when a storm begins.
- In Volkov's version, just before meeting the Cowardly Lion, Ellie gets kidnapped by an ogre, and Bogeyman and the Iron Lumberjack save her.
- In Volkov's version, Munchkins, Winkies and Quadlings (renamed as Chatters, Russian: Болтуны) have different quirk involving their people's names: Munchkins constantly move their jaws as if they were munching, Winkies blink a lot and Chatters (Quadlings) cannot stop talking. As with Baum's version, each of the Countries also have a national color assigned to it: Munchkin Country light blue, Winkie Country violet, Quadling Country pink, Vilina's uninhabited country yellow, and the Emerald City green.
- The armless Hammer-Heads with stretching necks were replaced in Volkov's version with an anatomically correct and physically strong nation of Leapers, also having another name, Marrans.
- In Volkov's version (starting with the 1959 edition), as soon as Ellie and Totoshka arrive in Magic Land, Totoshka gains the ability to speak, which he retains until they leave. In Baum's version, this is not the case, and Toto behaves exactly like a normal dog. (However, in subsequent Oz books, it was established that every animal that comes to Oz gains the ability to speak, and Toto mostly just chooses to stay quiet because this is what he is used to.)
- In Baum's version, Dorothy is an orphan and lives with her Uncle Henry and her Aunt Em. In Volkov's version, Ellie lives with both of her parents, John and Ann.
- In the original version, the Good Witch of the North kisses Dorothy on her forehead, blessing her, and the Wicked Witch of the West doesn't dare hit her because of the blessing. In Volkov's version, Villina doesn't kiss Ellie, and Bastinda is afraid of hitting Ellie because she wears the magic silver shoes of Gingema.
- In the original version, Dorothy was unaware of the Wicked Witch of the West's aquaphobia until the latter melted. In Volkov's version, Ellie knew Bastinda was afraid of water, and often left the kitchen floor wet to annoy the witch.
- An additional subplot in Volkov's version during Ellie's imprisonment in Bastinda's castle involves Ellie and the cook Fregosa motivating other Winkies to prepare a coup against Bastinda.
- Baum's book tells the story solely from Dorothy's point of view. Volkov's book tells the story first from Ellie's perspective, then switches to Gingema, then back to Ellie as she is running away from the cyclone.

== Sequels ==
In 1959 a new edition of the book was published, significantly revised by the author. This edition first featured illustrations by artist L.V. Vladimirsky and became popular in the 1960s, leading to five sequels:

- Urfin Jus and his Wooden Soldiers (1963)
- The Seven Underground Kings (1964)
- The Fiery God of the Marrans (1968)
- The Yellow Fog (1970)
- The Secret of the Abandoned Castle (1975, published in 1982)

These sequels were written by Volkov himself and are not based on Baum's plot elements, although we do encounter the powder of life, a character called Charlie Black similar to Cap'n Bill, intelligent foxes, and the use of a Sandboat similar to Johnny Dooit's, albeit with wheels.

== Film and TV adaptations ==
- The Wizard of the Emerald City (1968): puppet production.
- The Wizard of the Emerald City (1974): stop-motion animated television series, based on novels The Wizard of the Emerald City, Urfin Jus and his Wooden Soldiers and The Seven Underground Kings.
- The Wizard of the Emerald City (1994): live-action film.
- Fantastic Journey to Oz (2017): computer-animated film, loosely based on novel Urfin Jus and his Wooden Soldiers.
- Fantastic Return to Oz (2019): computer-animated film, loosely based on novel The Fire God of the Marrans, as well as being a sequel to Fantastic Journey to Oz.
- The Wizard of the Emerald City (2025): live-action film directed by Igor Voloshin.
