= Pyotr Mamonov =

Russian rock musician (1951–2021)

Pyotr Mamonov Пётр Мамонов
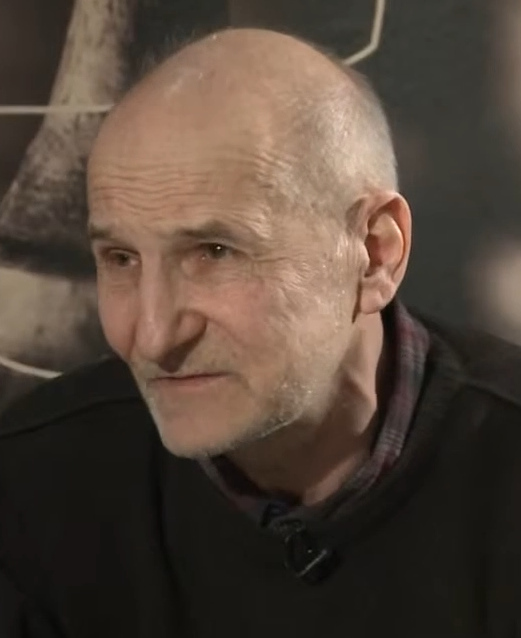
- Mamonov in 2019

Background information
- Born: Pyotr Nikolayevich Mamonov; 14 April 1951; Moscow, Russian SFSR, Soviet Union
- Died: 15 July 2021 (aged 70) Moscow, Russia
- Genres: Alternative rock; progressive rock; experimental rock
- Occupations: Musician; actor
- Instruments: Vocals; guitar
- Years active: 1960s–2021
- Labels: Warner Bros.; Otdelenie Vykhod; Moroz
- Formerly of: Mamonov and Aleksei; Zvuki Mu

Pyotr Nikolayevich Mamonov (Russian: Пётр Никола́евич Мамо́нов, pronounced [ˈpʲɵtr nʲɪkɐˈlajɪvʲɪtɕ mɐˈmonəf]; 14 April 1951 – 15 July 2021) was a Russian rock musician and the frontman of the Moscow band Zvuki Mu, as well as a stage and film actor.

== Early life ==
Pyotr Nikolayevich Mamonov was born on 14 April 1951 to an engineer and a translator of Scandinavian languages. During his childhood, he lived on Bolshoi Karetny Lane. During his teens, he would dress as a stilyaga and often got into fights, one such incident resulting in a scar across his stomach (which can be seen in the film Igla, which he starred in over 20 years later). Mamonov's parents separated in the mid 1950s and his mother began a relationship with Nikolai Bortnichuk, also an engineer. This relationship resulted in the birth of Mamonov's half-brother, Aleksei Bortnichuk, on 13 July 1958.

His first band was a cover band named Express, who were active in the mid-to-late 1960s and early 1970s, playing covers of popular rock bands such as the Beatles, the Rolling Stones and Led Zeppelin, although Mamonov himself preferred black R&B, soul and rock 'n roll music. During the 1970s, he suffered from depression and worked various jobs, including as a boiler operator and Norwegian translator (he learned the language from his mother). He lived with the artist Olga Gorokhova between 1979 and 1981. Gorokhova stated that Mamonov would listen to a lot of Weather Report's music during this period.

== Zvuki Mu ==
In 1982, he formed Zvuki Mu. The name originates from a series of affectionate names beginning with the syllable mu which Mamonov and Gorokhova would call each other, though the earliest occurrence of the name Zvuki Mu occurs in some of Mamonov's poetry from the late 1960s. Between 1986 and late 1987, he wore a moustache – it can be seen in images of Mamonov from that period, such as the images inside the booklet of the compilation Mamonov '84–'87.

Mamonov was one of the few rock musicians from former USSR who managed to achieve recognition abroad, through his collaboration with Brian Eno in the late 1980s. Around the same period, he started acting in films, and over the next decade wrote, produced and acted in several one-man theatrical performances establishing himself as a cult figure in Russia.

Zvuki Mu initially performed between 1982 and 1990, after which Mamonov started a new band called Mamonov and Aleksei with his half-brother Aleksei Bortnichuk. The new band performed music of a similar style to Zvuki Mu, using backing tracks instead of live drums, but in 1993–1994, they acquired a live drummer and developed a new, back-to-basics hard rock sound, with Mamonov rewriting some older Zvuki Mu songs to fit in with this style. They released one album in 1992 and were recording a second one when Mamonov decided to rename the group to Zvuki Mu, resulting in the release of Zvuki Mu's Gruby zakat album in 1995.

== Post-Zvuki Mu ==
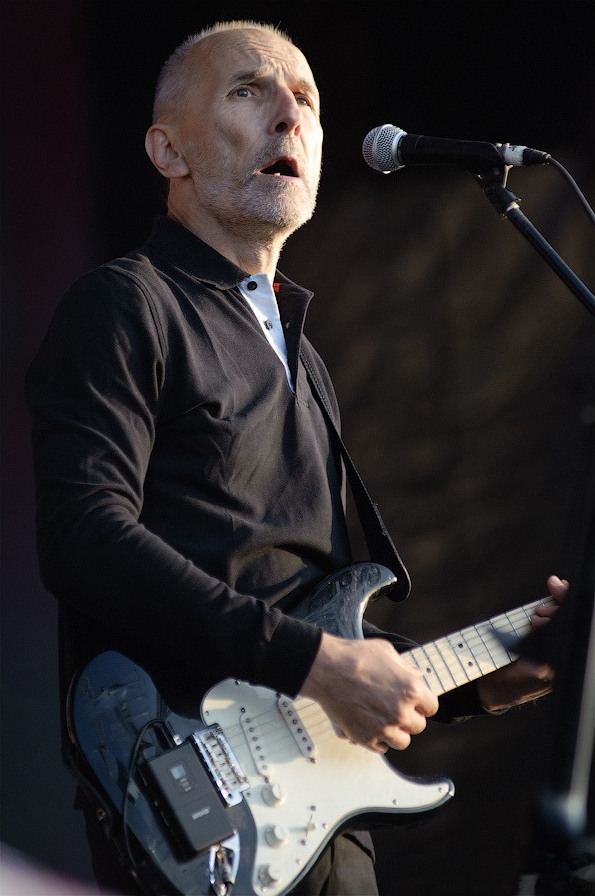
Mamonov performing in 2011

In 1996, after disagreements between Mamonov and the other Zvuki Mu members, the band broke up again, with Zvuki Mu becoming just a pseudonym for Mamonov's solo work. He switched to using his own name for music in 2005, but in 2015, he formed a new band, Sovershenno novye Zvuki Mu (Brand New Zvuki Mu) with musicians from the indie band Stoneberry.

== Acting career ==
One of Mamonov's best-known film appearances is in the leading role in Pavel Lungin's 1990 Taxi Blues. His theatre creations include Is There Life on Mars?, an absurdist take on Anton Chekhov's A Marriage Proposal, and Chocolate Pushkin, which makes a comical reference to (but doesn't cite) the Russian national poet Alexander Pushkin. Mamonov explained the name for the album as his own comparison to a popular DJ who calls himself "Black Elvis" and also describes the genre on this record as "lit-hop" (literature hip-hop).

In 2001, he appeared in a short but characteristic role in Serguei Loban's Dust (Russian: Пыль) that was released only 4 years later and became a cult film. He returned to play the lead role in Pavel Lungin's religious film The Island (Russian: Остров), which closed the 2006 Venice Film Festival. His acting in the film was praised by Alexy II, Patriarch of Moscow, and won him a Best Actor Nika Award.

In 2009, Pavel Lungin invited him to appear in his new production entitled Tsar (Russian Царь). Mamonov plays the title hero, Tsar Ivan the Terrible, a character torn between passionate faith and cruelty.

Pyotr Mamonov played the main roles in the short films "Tea" (2016, Russian: Чай) and "Fixative" (2021, Russian: Фиксаж).

== Personal life ==
In 1995, he stated in an interview that he enjoyed listening to alternative rock, heavy metal and grunge, naming Nine Inch Nails, Jane's Addiction, the Butthole Surfers, White Zombie and Pantera as examples.

In the 1990s, Mamonov converted to Orthodox Christianity, left the capital and settled in a village.

In August 2019, Mamonov suffered a heart attack, necessitating the cancellation of his concerts for two and a half months while he had surgery.

On 26 June 2021, Mamonov was hospitalised with COVID-19. He was put into a medically induced coma and died on 15 July at the age of 70.
