= Krzysztof Kopczyński =

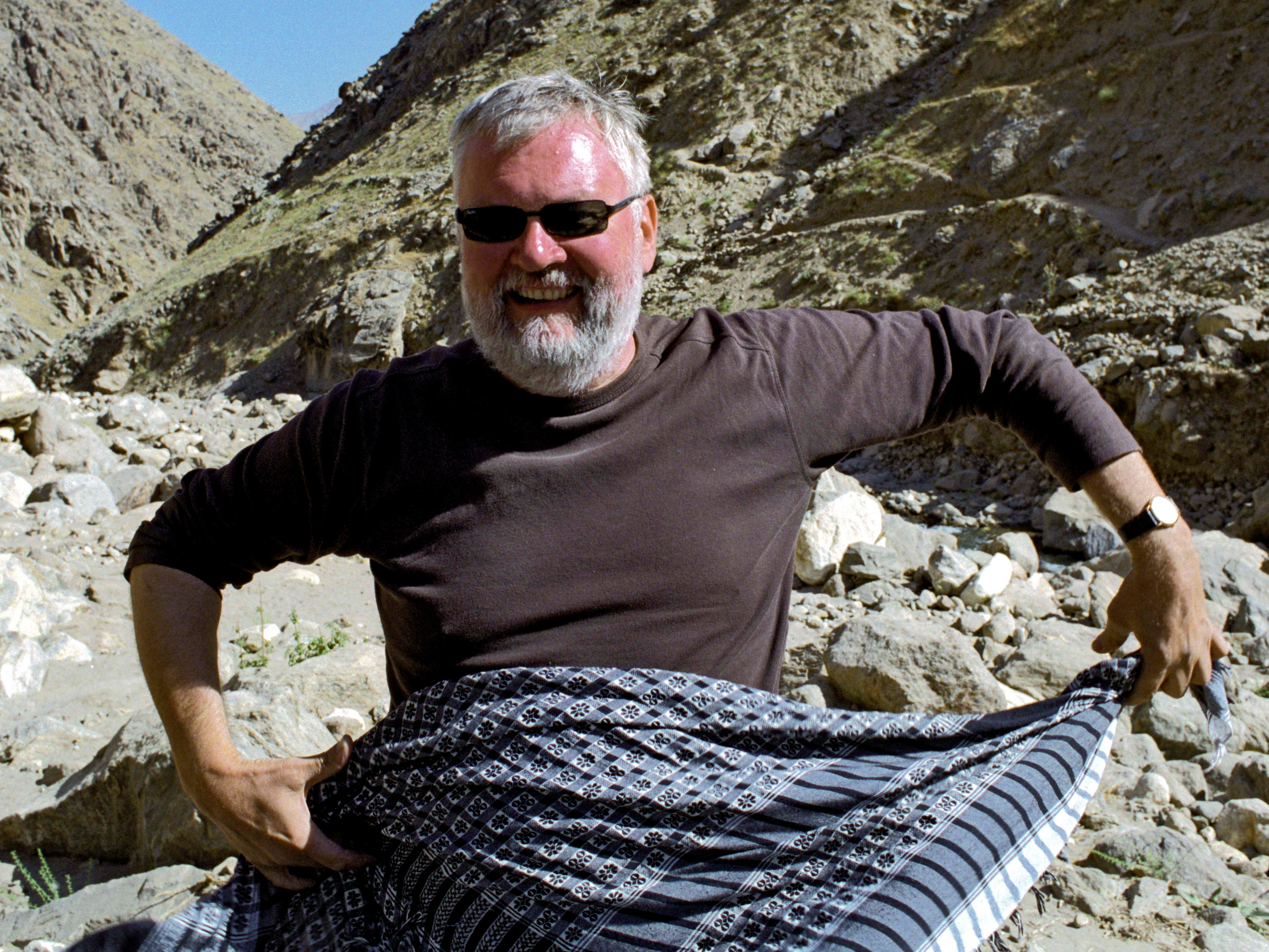
Krzysztof Kopczyński

Krzysztof Kopczyński is a Polish film-maker and author.

== Biography ==
He was born in 1959 in Warsaw. He is also a doctor of humanities, lecturer at the University of Warsaw, and an expert of the Polish Film Institute.

He has written and produced a number of films including Stone Silence, a multiple award-winning documentary. He has also authored three books and several dozen articles about nineteenth-century and contemporary Polish culture and media. He is an associate professor at the Faculty of Polish Studies at the University of Warsaw. In 1997, Kopczyński established Eureka Media under which he has produced over 40 films screened worldwide over 600 times. His films have received more than 100 awards on different festivals.

In the years 1980–1981, Kopczyński was the chairman of the students' union of the Faculty of Polish Studies at the University of Warsaw and the editor of "Free Speech" ( PL: "Głos Wolny") a student magazine. He graduated with a Master's from the Faculty of Polish Studies in 1983, and ten years later he received his Ph.D. Between 1984 and 1989, he worked as an editor for the underground publishing house, CDN. Later on in 1989, Kopczyński co-founded Ex Libris, a monthly magazine and subsequently became its chief editor. From 1992 to 1994, he worked as Director General of Aid for Polish Libraries Foundation. He is a member of the European Documentary Network, the International Documentary Association, Polish Film-makers Association and International Association "Future of Media" (2002–2008, president). He is also a certified coach with the International Coaching Community.

== Filmography ==
- 2015 - The Dybbuk. A Tale of Wandering Souls, Director
- 2010 - Planet Kirsan, Producer,
- 2009 – The Forest, Producer,
- 2009 - Ting Ting Discovers Poland, Director, script, producer,
- 2009 – Unemployed in Russia- Poland. New Gaze, Producer,
- 2009 – Warsaw Available, Producer,
- 2009 – 17th August, Producer,
- 2008 – The Art of Silence, Executive producer,
- 2008 – Long-Distance Runner, Producer,
- 2007-2008 – Towards Poland, Originator, Executive producer,
- 2007 – Towards World, Executive producer
- 2007 – The First Day, 52 Percent in Russia-Poland. New Gaze, Producer,
- 2007 – Kites, Producer,
- 2007 – Stone Silence, Director, script, producer,
- 2007 – Borovichok, Producer,
- 2006 – Constellations, Producer,
- 2005 – Folk Tale, 7 X Moskow, Moskow Wife, The Last Stop. Zagorz, About The Truth, The Seeds,6 BieliŃSkiego Street, MY KieŚLowski, Suburban Train, Sacred in Russia-Poland. New Gaze Producer,
- 2005 – The Other Producer,
- 2005 – A Miracle at the Vistula River, Producer,
- 2004 – The Children of Leningradsky, Production assistance,
- 2004 – Prophet in the Theatre, Producer,
- 2004 - AL. Tribute To Albert Maysle, Script, Producer,
- 2003 – Warsaw. View From The East Script, Executive producer,
- 2003 – My Warsaw, Executive producer,
- 2003 - I, Gombro, Producer,
- 2003 – Deyna, Executive producer,
- 2002 – Words And Signs, Executive producer,
- 2000 – The Signs, Executive producer,
- 2000 - Zbig, Producer,
- 2000 - Clairvoyant Producer,
- 1999 - Jerzy Grotowski. An Attempt at a Portrait, Executive producer,
- 1999 - Andrzej Seweryn. Actor - Acteur Producer,
- 1999 - 24 Days, Producer,
- 1997 – Change Me into A Long Serpent, Executive producer,
- 1997 – Portrait in Space. Tadeusz Wybult – Art Designer Producer,
- 1997 – Conductor Paradox, Executive producer,
- 1997 – Weightlessness Gravity, Executive producer,
- 1992 – Film Supplement.Kot. Tribute TO Konstanty JeleŃSki Script,
- 1992 - Kot. Tribute To Konstanty JeleŃSki Cooperation with realization, Script,

== Awards ==
- 2008 - 52 Percent in Russia-Poland.New Gaze. Pampeluna (International Documentary Film Festival "Punto de Vista") Main Prize for the best short movie
- 2008 – Stone Silence Neubrandenburg-Szczecin (European Film Festival "Dokument Art") Iii Prize
- 2008 – Stone Silence Łódź (Family Film Festival) I Prize
- 2008 - Kites (Locarno International Film Festival) The Semaine de la criticque prize
- 2008 – Stone Silence Crakow (Crakow Film Festival -Polish Competition) Honour Diploma
- 2008 – Stone Silence Kijów (Ukrainian Context - Human Rights Documentary Film Days) Special Jury Prize
- 2008 – Stone Silence Guia de Isora (International Documentary Film Festival "MiradasDoc") The best directing debut
- 2008 – Stone Silence Ann Arbor (Polish Film Festival) Audience Prize
- 2007 - award- Bronisław Chromy statue for the best producer of Polish short and documentary films 47. Cracow Film Festival
- 2007 – Stone Silence Lipsk (International Documentary and Animated Film Festival) Ecumenic Jury Prize
- 2007 – Stone Silence Chicago (International Documentary Film Festival) "Sky is the Limit" Prize, "Work in progress" category
- 2006 – The Seeds in Russia-Poland. New Gaze Laur, National (Russian) Film Prize for The best short author movie
- 2006 – The Seeds in Russia - Poland. New Gaze Laur, National (Russian) Film Prize, Nominee for: The best short documentary television film
- 2006 -award- Bronisław Chromy statue award for The best Polish producer of short and documentary movies at 46th. (Cracow Film Festival)
