= Alexander Volkov (writer) =

Soviet writer

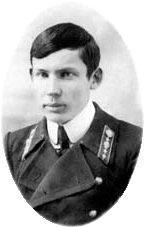
- Russian writer Alexander Melentyevich Volkov, 1914
- Born: Alexander Melentyevich Volkov; 14 June 1891; Ust-Kamenogorsk, Semipalatinsk Oblast, Russian Empire
- Died: 3 July 1977 (aged 86); Moscow, Soviet Union

Alexander Melentyevich Volkov (Russian: Александр Мелентьевич Волков [ɐlʲɪkˈsandr mʲɪˈlʲenʲtʲjɪvʲɪtɕ ˈvolkəf]; 14 June 1891 – 3 July 1977) was a Soviet novelist, playwright, university lecturer. He was an author of novels, short stories, plays and poems for children, mostly remembered for the Magic Land series of books, based on L. Frank Baum's The Wonderful Wizard of Oz.

== Biography ==
Volkov was born in Ust-Kamenogorsk, Semipalatinsk Oblast, Russian Empire (now Oskemen, Kazakhstan). At the age of 12 he graduated from the Ust-Kamenogorsk town school as valedictorian, where he would later teach. In 1907 he entered the Tomsk Teachers Institute. In 1909 he graduated with the right to teach all subjects of the school curriculum, except for the Law of God.

He began to work as a teacher in Ust-Kamenogorsk. Starting in 1910, he worked as a mathematics teacher in the village of Kolyvan. In the 1920s he moved to Yaroslavl, where he worked as a school principal. He graduated in absentia from the mathematical faculty of the Yaroslavl Pedagogical Institute.

In 1929 he moved to Moscow, where he worked as the head teacher of the rabfak. He completed coursework and passed the external examinations at the Physics and Mathematics Faculty of Moscow University in seven months.

Starting in 1931 he worked as a teacher, and later as Docent of the Department of Higher Mathematics of the Moscow Institute of Non-Ferrous Metals and Gold.

== Writings ==
=== Magic Land series ===
The first of these books, The Wizard of the Emerald City (Russian: Волшебник Изумрудного города), is a loose translation of the first Oz book, with chapters added, altered, or omitted, and some names changed (for example, Dorothy becomes "Ellie", Oz is renamed "Magic Land", and Toto can talk when in Magic Land), and several characters given personal names instead of generic ones. Baum's name is mentioned in the first of Volkov's books, but the publisher paid no royalties to the Baum estate. First published in 1939 in the Soviet Union, the book became quite popular; and in the 1960s Volkov also wrote his own sequels to the story. He liberally borrowed from some of the originals, such as using the "Powder of Life" idea from The Marvelous Land of Oz, but mostly created a divergent universe. From 1963 to 1970, four more books in the series were published, with the sixth and final story published posthumously in 1982. Other authors such as Yuri Kuznetsov, Sergei Sukhinov, and Leonid Vladimirsky (Volkov's original illustrator) have recently written additional sequels in Russian, creating in effect an alternative series of Oz books.

The context and situations found in the Volkov version are notably different from the original Baum version in their political tones. The situations, while still maintaining a childlike clarity of good versus evil, often involve the characters encountering very mature political and ethical decisions. The heroes are repeatedly called upon to defend Magic Land against invasions or topple feudalistic or aristocratic governments to free the populace. Both themes are often found in Soviet sci-fi and adventure literature (see the Strugatsky brothers' novels Hard to be a God and Inhabited Island).

Volkov had faith in the omnipotence of the man-made technique, so the wizardry of his heroes was usually won with the help of various technical inventions (a cannon designed by Charly Black, a mechanical drill, and Tilly-Willy; a super-robot).

Volkov's Magic Land series was translated into many languages and was popular with children all over the Eastern bloc. Volkov's version of Oz seems to be better known than Baum's in some countries, for example in China, in Germany (especially former East Germany), and also in Arab countries such as Syria. In Germany, two authors have written their own set of sequels to Volkov's books.

The books in the series have been translated into English by Peter L. Blystone, and were published by Red Branch Press in three volumes (two books per volume) in 1991, 1993, and 2007. A revised edition of the first two-book volume was published in 2010.

== Bibliography ==
=== Magic Land books ===
- The Wizard of the Emerald City (Волшебник Изумрудного города, 1939)
- Urfin Joos and his Wooden Soldiers (Урфин Джюс и его деревянные солдаты, 1963)
- The Seven Underground Kings (Семь подземных королей, 1964)
- The Fiery God of the Marrans (Огненный бог марранов, 1968)
- The Yellow Fog (Жёлтый туман, 1970)
- The Secret of the Deserted Castle (Тайна заброшенного замка, 1975, published in 1982)

=== Other books ===
- Wonderful balloon (The first aeronaut) (1940)
- The Two Brothers (1950, rewritten in 1961)
- The Architects (1954)
- Astern trace (1960)
- The Wandering (1963) (about childhood and youth of Giordano Bruno)
- Prisoner of Zargrad (1969)
- Land and Sky (1972)
