= Alter Tepliker =

Alter Tepliker was the sobriquet of Rabbi Moshe Yehoshua Bezhilianski (d. 1919), a learned scholar and leading Breslover Hasid in Uman, Ukraine in the late 19th and early 20th centuries.

== Biography ==
Born in Teplyk, Ukraine, he became active in the Breslover community in nearby Uman, where he married the sister of Abraham Chazan. Chazan's father, Nachman Chazan, was the closest disciple of Reb Noson, who was in turn the closest disciple of Rebbe Nachman of Breslov.

Breslover leaders of the following generation, such as Rabbis Shmuel Horowitz and Yitzchok Gelbach, attributed their initial interest in Breslov teachings to their first exposure to Alter Tepliker's Hishtafchut HaNefesh.

He fell victim to a Cossack pogrom during the Ukrainian struggle for independence in 1919. He was murdered in a synagogue while holding a sefer Torah.

Rabbi Alter Tefliker was the first to initiate the printing of the writings of Rabbi Nachman of Breslav and his student Rabbi Natan in a format divided into different topics. His famous books are Mishivat Nefesh (Lemberg 1772) which deals with the issues of faith, repentance and the service of God, and the outpouring of the soul (Jerusalem 1774) which deals with matters of prayer and solitude, central topics in the Breslav Torah.

His books had a great influence on the followers of Breslav. Some of the leaders of Hasidism in the generations that followed him testified that their first encounter with Breslav's teachings was through his book "The Outpouring of the Soul". In the last generation, his books were printed in many editions and were widely distributed. His other books are: "Amonat Aitach" (Lamberg 1773 with the days of Moharna 1978) - which deals with the virtue of utilizing time, "Or Zarua" (Jerusalem 1777) - a commentary on the Passover Haggadah, "Mili Davot" (Piotrkov Tera d) - On the Tractate of Avot and Commentary "Mi Ha Nahal" (Bnei Brak 5655) on part of the book of Rabbi Nachman of Breslav, Lakoti Moharan. Many of his manuscripts, including traditions and rumors from the elders of the Hasids, as well as other books he prepared for printing, have been lost. Dr. Zvi Marek's book "Secret Scroll: The Secret Messianic Vision of Rabbi Nachman of Breslav" is based on a manuscript by Rabbi Alter Teflikar.

== Publications ==
Tepliker pioneered the publication of Breslover teachings on specific topics. His ten books include:

- Hishtafchut HaNefesh (Outpouring of the Soul) — on the topic of hitbodedut (meditation)
- Meshivat Nefesh (Restore My Soul) — on the topic of inner strength
- Or Zorei'ach Haggadah (The Breslov Haggadah) — on the Passover Haggadah
- A commentary on Pirkey Avot
- Mei HaNachal (Waters of the River) — a commentary on Rebbe Nachman's Likutey Moharan.
