= Chayey Moharan =

1874 biography by Nathan of Breslov

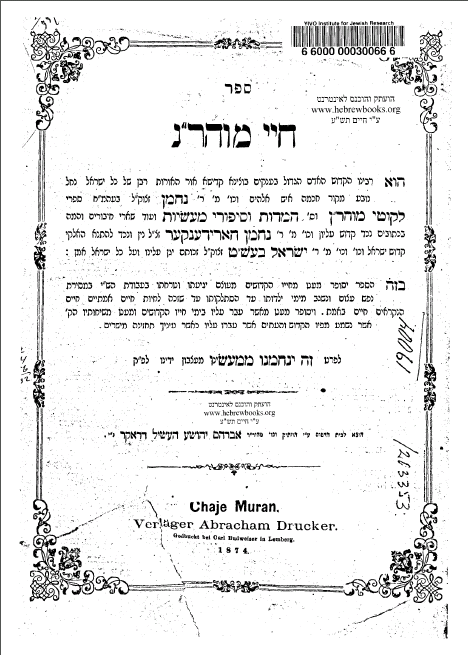
- 1874 first edition title page
- Author: Nathan of Breslov
- Language: English
- Genre: Judaism
- Publisher: Nathan Goldstein, Rav of Tcherin
- Publication date: 1874
- Media type: Hardback, paperback, digital image, and digital text

Chayey Moharan (Hebrew: חיי מוהר"ן) is the biography of Rabbi Nachman of Breslov, written by his disciple and scribe Rabbi Nathan of Breslov. As the tzaddik is of central importance in Judaism and especially Breslov, and as the book is about Rabbi Nachman's life and Rabbi Nachman and his followers held himself to be the tzaddik hador (tzaddik of the era), Chayey Moharan is an extremely important Jewish book. It became more widely known to Anglophones with the publication of its translation, titled Tzaddik, by Breslov Research Institute, in 1987. "MOHaRaN" is an acrostic for Moreinu V'Rabeinu Harav Rabbi Nachman meaning "Our Master and Teacher, Rabbi Nachman."

The book's title page gives the following praise of its subject and description of its contents:

Life of MOHARAN

Namely Rabbeinu haKadosh, towering among giants, the holy lamp, light of lights, schoolmaster of all Yisrael, "Gushing brook, source of wisdom", man of God, our master Rabbi Nachman, memory of the righteous and holy is a blessing, composer of the books Likutei Moharan, Sefer haMidot, Sipurei Ma`asiyoth, and other books, "that are [on the level] of the Ketuvim", great-grandson of the holy, lofty etc. Rabbi Nachman Horondenker, memory of the righteous is a blessing, grandson and nephew of the godly Tanna, holy one of Yisrael, our master Rabbi Yisrael Baal Shem Tov, memory of the righteous and holy is blessing, may their merit protect us and all Yisrael, Amen.

In this book is told a little of his holy life, his enormous toil and effort in serving God, may He be blessed, in enormous and supreme self sacrifice, from his childhood days to his passing, until he merited to live true life, life that is truly called "life". And it tells a little of events in his holy life and a little of his holy conversations that were heard from his holy mouth, and the time periods that passed on him, such as "your eyes may see his upright doings" (Ps. 17:2).

== History, editions and omissions ==
Rabbi Nathan compiled Rabbi Nachman's biography some time after 1823. Before this, he had been personally engaged in the printing of Rabbi Nachman's works, but then his printing activities became hampered due to opposition and the book was not printed in his lifetime, but remained in the hand of disciples. Rabbi Nathan's follower, Rabbi Nachman of Tcherin, made the first printing in 1874 in Lemberg, both adding and omitting some material and signing himself in the editor's notes as hama`atik ('the copier'). The omissions include items that Rabbi Nachman ordered be kept within Breslev circles, as well as statements that would have provoked the opposition exceedingly at the time, such as bold statements of Rabbi Nachman's greatness.

Numerous editions followed, and a few of them add some of the omissions back in. The 1982 edition by Agudat Meshekh HaNachal, Jerusalem, introduced an overall numbering system which labeled all the paragraphs from one to 613, whereas previously each of the approximately 19 sections had their own paragraph numberings starting from one; and this one-to-613 numbering has become prevalent in subsequent editions.

Breslov Research Institute's Tzaddik has all the omissions added back in except a few; the full manuscripts were made available to the editor and he included them.

Recently more Hebrew editions have been released which include the omissions, including some that are not included in Tzaddik, for example the one available at BreslevCarmiel.com.

A 2015 edition by publisher Nekodah Tovah includes, besides all the omissions (except one), an appendix Kuntres haHosafoth (Tract of Appendi) compiled by R' Shmuel Horowitz (1903-1973) consisting of 307 paragraphs, in sections ranging from stories of the Baal Shem Tov (related to R' Nachman's birth), to Rabbi Nachman of Breslov, to his followers, to manuscripts by the Tcheriner Rav. R' Shmuel for many years collected stories and writings from Rabbi Abraham Chazan (1849-1917), son of Rabbi Nachman Chazan of Tulchin.
