= Levi Yitzchok Bender =

Rabbi Levi Yitzchok Bender רבי לוי יצחק בנדר
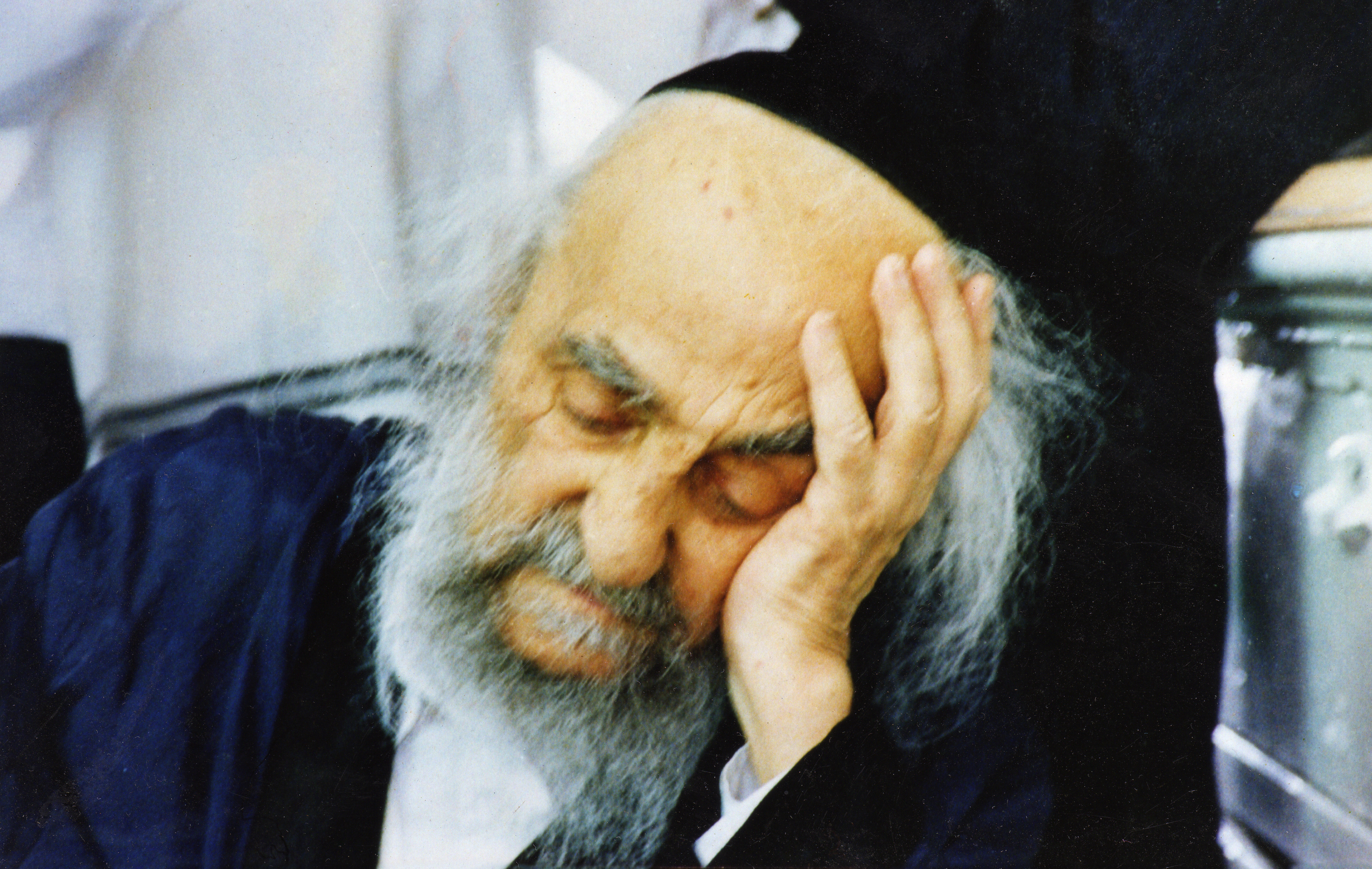

Personal life
- Born: 23 June 1897 Grodzisk, Poland
- Died: 25 July 1989 (aged 92) Jerusalem
- Buried: Mount of Olives, Jerusalem

Religious life
- Religion: Judaism

Jewish leader
- Semikhah: Rabbi Avraham Chazan

Rabbi Levi Yitzchok Bender (Hebrew: רבי לוי יצחק בנדר; 23 June 1897 – 25 July 1989, born the 23rd of Sivan 5657 – 22nd of Tamuz 5749) was a rabbi and leader of the Breslov community in both Uman, Ukraine and Jerusalem, in Israel.

== Early life ==
Bender was born in the town of Grodzisk, Poland, as the tenth of twelve children. At the age of seventeen, he traveled to Uman without his parents' permission. Afterwards, he sent them a letter to let them know where he was. Although they were angry, they allowed him to stay and eventually made peace with his decision.

In Uman, Bender began learning under Rabbi Abraham Chazan, the son of Rabbi Nachman of Tulchin, who was the closest disciple of Nathan of Breslov (Reb Noson) -- who was in turn the closest disciple of Rebbe Nachman of Breslov. Although Chazan had immigrated to Jerusalem in 1894, he returned each year to Uman for Rosh Hashana. During World War I he was unable to leave Russia. Bender and others were able to learn under Chazan continuously until the latter died in Uman in 1917.

== Breslov leader ==
After his mentor's death, Bender decided to remain in Uman for the next two decades, learning and interacting with other Breslover Hasidim who congregated in the Breslover synagogue built by Reb Noson in 1834. His special leadership qualities were recognized by the other Hasidim, and he assumed leadership of the community together with Rabbi Eliyahu Chaim Rosen. Bender was appointed prayer leader for the annual Breslover Rosh Hashana kibbutz—an honor reserved for the most respected and devout members of the community—when he was only 30 years old.

Between 1932 and 1934, Ukraine suffered from a famine engineered by Joseph Stalin's forced collectivization of agriculture. An estimated 5 to 8 million Ukrainians died during this time, and Jewish communities starved along with them. Bender and Rosen appealed to organizations both inside and outside Russia, including the American Jewish Joint Distribution Committee, for food and assistance on behalf of Ukrainian Jews. Their efforts came to the attention of the Soviet authorities, who arrested and imprisoned the two in 1935 on the charge of making contact with a foreign organization. Facing a possible death sentence, they were reprieved with the help of a Jewish official at the ministry of justice in Kiev, Ukraine who was sympathetic to Breslover Hasidim.

Though Bender and Rosen were allowed to return to their homes, they were not allowed to leave the city of Uman. However, both men fled the city. Rosen traveled to Moscow to pick up an exit visa to Israel that was waiting for him, while Bender migrated from city to city, never remaining long in any one place.

== Return to Uman ==
Bender risked his life to return to Uman again for the Rosh Hashana pilgrimage of 1938. By this time the Soviet authorities had clamped down on religious observance by closing down the Breslover synagogue in Uman and converting it into a metalworking factory, and keeping close surveillance on illegal prayer gatherings. Bender and another 26 Hasidim from outside Uman risked their lives to spend Rosh Hashana in that city. To avoid being recognized in the Breslover minyan (now being held in a private apartment), Bender went to the house of a friend shortly before the holiday began and asked for permission to pray in the man's basement.

At 7:00 on the morning before Rosh Hashana, he slipped out to Rebbe Nachman's gravesite for a few minutes to recite the Tikkun HaKlali (the "General Remedy" which is customarily recited at the gravesite). He was spotted by another Jewish man known to be a government informer. Bender pleaded with the man not to report him, but as he walked back to his friend's house, he noticed the informer following him. Since he was familiar with all the back roads of Uman, he managed to shake him off his trail.

The informer went straight to the police, who mounted a citywide search for Bender on Rosh Hashana. Though they entered the house in which he was hiding and searched all the rooms, including the darkened basement, they overlooked the one room in which he hid.

As soon as the holiday was over, several Hasidim helped Bender escape the city by bandaging his entire head, leaving only his eyes uncovered, and accompanying him on a night train to Kiev. Bender's wife was on the same train. She debarked at a small village called Khrystynivka (Charsinvaka), located two stations away from Uman, purchased two tickets for Kiev, and reboarded the train. Bender met his wife in the Kiev station and disposed of the tickets he had bought in Uman. But the informer, who was on the same train following Mrs. Bender, spotted Reb Levi Yitzchok without his disguise in the station and called over a policeman. Though Bender was arrested and interrogated, he insisted he had not traveled from Uman but from Khrystynivka. The police believed him and released him. Bender spent the war years in Siberia and the post-war years in Poland. He became rabbi of the displaced-persons camp at Bad Reichenhal, Germany.

== Aliyah to Israel ==
In 1949, he was able to immigrate (Aliyah) to Israel. He lived there until his death in 1989.

== Religious beliefs ==
In accordance with Rebbe Nachman's teachings, Bender kept a rigorous personal study schedule and completed many key Jewish texts each year, finishing the entire Talmud and Zohar numerous times. He also practiced hitbodedut, the unique Breslov form of meditation, and recited tikkun chatzot (the midnight lament) over the destruction of the Temple in Jerusalem, every night for 75 years. But when someone once asked him, "Which of your accomplishments is most precious to you? Which are you going to present to the Heavenly Court?" Bender answered, "I lived 30 years in Russia, and I still believe in God!"
