= The Rooster Prince =

Jewish parable

The Rooster Prince, also sometimes translated as The Turkey Prince, is a Jewish mashal or parable told by Rabbi Nachman of Breslov, founder of the Breslov form of Hasidic Judaism. It was first told orally, and later published and appeared in numerous folklore anthologies and works on Hasidic storytelling.

== Story ==
In this story, a young prince behaves as if he is a rooster (or turkey.) He takes off his clothes, sits naked under the table, and pecks at his food on the floor. The king and queen are horrified that the heir to the throne is acting this way. They call in various sages and healers and other experts to try and convince the prince to act human again, but to no avail. Then a new wise man comes to the palace and claims he can cure the prince. He takes off his clothes and sits naked under the table with him, claiming to be a rooster, too. Gradually the prince comes to accept him as a friend. The sage then tells the prince that a rooster can wear clothes, eat at the table, etc. The Rooster Prince accepts this idea and, step-by-step, begins to act human, until he is completely cured.

== Interpretations ==
The main interpretation of this story is that the prince represents a simple Jew who has forgotten his true self, and the sage represents a Hasidic Rebbe who has the cure for his soul. Rather than condemn the simple Jew for being non-religious, the Rebbe "descends" to his level to meet him where he is, then shows him how to return to God, step by step, and in a manner that he can accept. Some Breslov Hasidim say that the "wise man" is Rebbe Nachman, himself. In 1991, Rabbi Avraham Greenbaum, himself a Breslover Hasid, published an entire self-help book based on this story, entitled Under the Table and How to Get Up. This book goes, step by step, through the story, expanding each detail into a personal lesson on spiritual growth.

Rakhmones (compassion towards others) and mitzves (doing good deeds) are two key Yiddish concepts demonstrated in the story. The reader is shown how the prince becomes human not through merely appearing and acting like one, but by caring for himself and others.

The story also raises the question: what is wisdom? The king's and queen's great wealth and power proved useless in providing them solutions to their problem.

As noted, above, there is some debate as to which barnyard bird was originally being referred to in the story. The parable was originally told in Yiddish. Some early translations and oral traditions rendered the Yiddish word אינדיק indik as "Indian rooster". (A well-known example is in Souls on Fire by Elie Wiesel, where he retells the story as heard from his Hasidic grandfather.) Others thought the word referred to the male junglefowl or a peacock. More recently, some translators, most notably the Breslov Research Institute, have rendered it as turkey. (The fan tail of a turkey does resemble that of a peacock.) These differences do not affect the basic plot of the story.

== In popular culture ==
"The Rooster Prince" is the title of the second episode of the FX television series Fargo. It was written by show creator Noah Hawley and was directed by Adam Bernstein.

== Sources ==
- Greenbaum, Avraham (1991). Under the Table and How to Get Up. Jerusalem: Breslov Research Institute.
- Kaplan, Aryeh (1983). Rabbi Nachman's Stories. Jerusalem: Breslov Research Institute, pp. 479–80. A scholarly commentary.
