= Eliyahu Chaim Rosen =

Rabbi Eliyahu Chaim Rosen אליהו חיים רוזן
- Title: Rosh Yeshiva

Personal life
- Born: 1899 Pułtusk, Poland
- Died: 1984 (aged 84–85) Jerusalem, Israel

Religious life
- Religion: Judaism

Jewish leader
- Predecessor: none
- Yeshiva: Breslover Yeshivah
- Began: 1937
- Ended: 1984

Eliyahu Chaim Rosen (Hebrew: אליהו חיים רוזן; 1899–1984) was a respected rabbi and leader of the Breslov Hasidim in Uman, Ukraine before World War II. After immigrating to Israel in 1936, he founded the Breslover Yeshiva in Jerusalem, and served as its rosh yeshiva for decades.

== Introduction to Uman ==
Rosen was born in Pułtusk, Poland, which was then part of the Russian Empire. He was orphaned as a very young boy. He was sent to a nearby city to begin learning Torah at the age of five, and proved himself to be a gifted student.

At the age of 12, he was accepted at the Łomża Yeshiva. There, he came across a copy of Tikkun HaKlali (Rebbe Nachman of Breslov's "General Remedy"), and met a Breslover Hasid who convinced him to visit the Breslover community in Uman. Rosen made the trip in 1914. Later he said that what impressed him about the community was that the followers of Rebbe Nachman, who were obviously Hasidim, abided by all the halachot of the Shulchan Aruch without engaging in "Hasidic twists" or reinterpretations of the law.

Rosen decided to stay in Uman, however, after he heard that Rebbe Nachman had said, "The most difficult spiritual devotion is far easier than a simple physical transaction." He sought an explanation from Rabbi Abraham Chazan, a leading Breslover teacher. (Chazan had moved to Jerusalem, but visited Uman every year. During World War I, Chazan was unable to leave the country and spent the time teaching and strengthening the Breslover community in Uman.)

Chazan explained, "Hitbodedut (meditation) is the greatest spiritual devotion one can perform. All it takes is speaking with one's mouth. Even earning just a small amount of money requires more effort than that." Upon hearing this, Rosen decided to remain in Uman and continue to learn from Chazan and other Breslover rabbis.

== Community leader ==
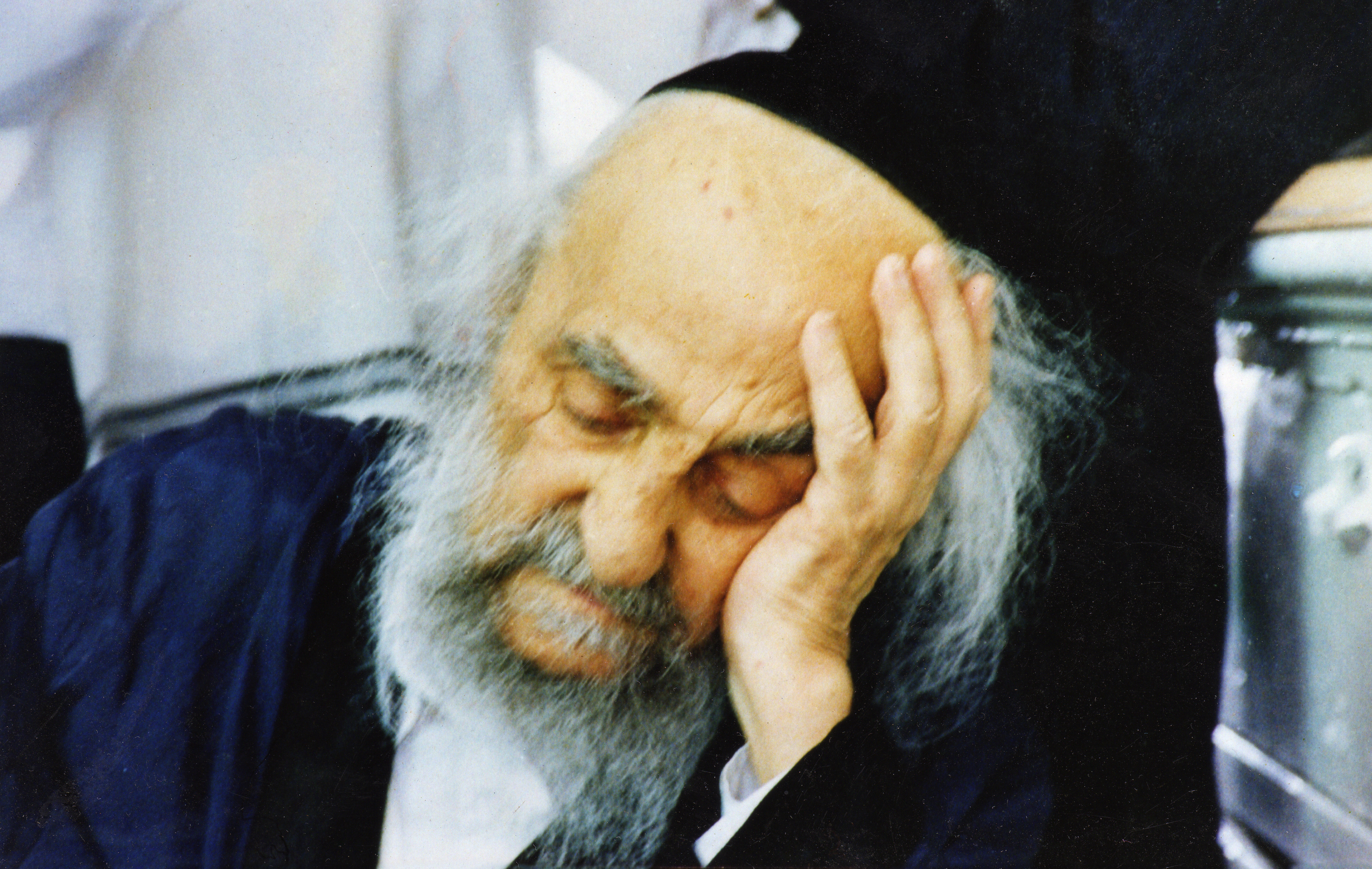
Rabbi Levi Yitzchok Bender.

Eventually, Rosen and Rabbi Levi Yitzchok Bender became the joint leaders of the Breslover community in Uman.

Rosen displayed his commitment to his flock during a government-engineered famine in Ukraine engineered by Joseph Stalin's forced collectivization of agriculture (see Holodomor). Rosen organized shipments from the bread lines in Moscow to the starving community in Uman, and also appealed to the American Jewish Joint Distribution Committee for assistance. This latter act brought Rosen and Bender to the attention of the NKVD in November 1935. The two were arrested and charged with making contact with foreign organizations. They were imprisoned, put on trial and faced the death sentence, but won an unexpected reprieve from by a sympathetic Jewish official in the Ministry of Justice in Kyiv.

Rosen and Bender were allowed to return to their homes, but were placed under "city arrest" and not allowed to leave Uman. However, both men fled the city. While Bender migrated from place to place, Rosen traveled straight to Moscow to pick up an exit visa that he had applied for in 1931.

== Aliyah to Israel ==
When the exit visa was ready, he used it to flee to Jerusalem, together with his family, arriving in the summer of 1936. Rosen's arrival heralded a new beginning for the fledgling Breslover community in Israel. Together with Rabbi Abraham Sternhartz, who had also immigrated to Jerusalem in 1936, Rosen led the Breslover community in Israel with warmth and dedication.

== Yeshiva founder ==
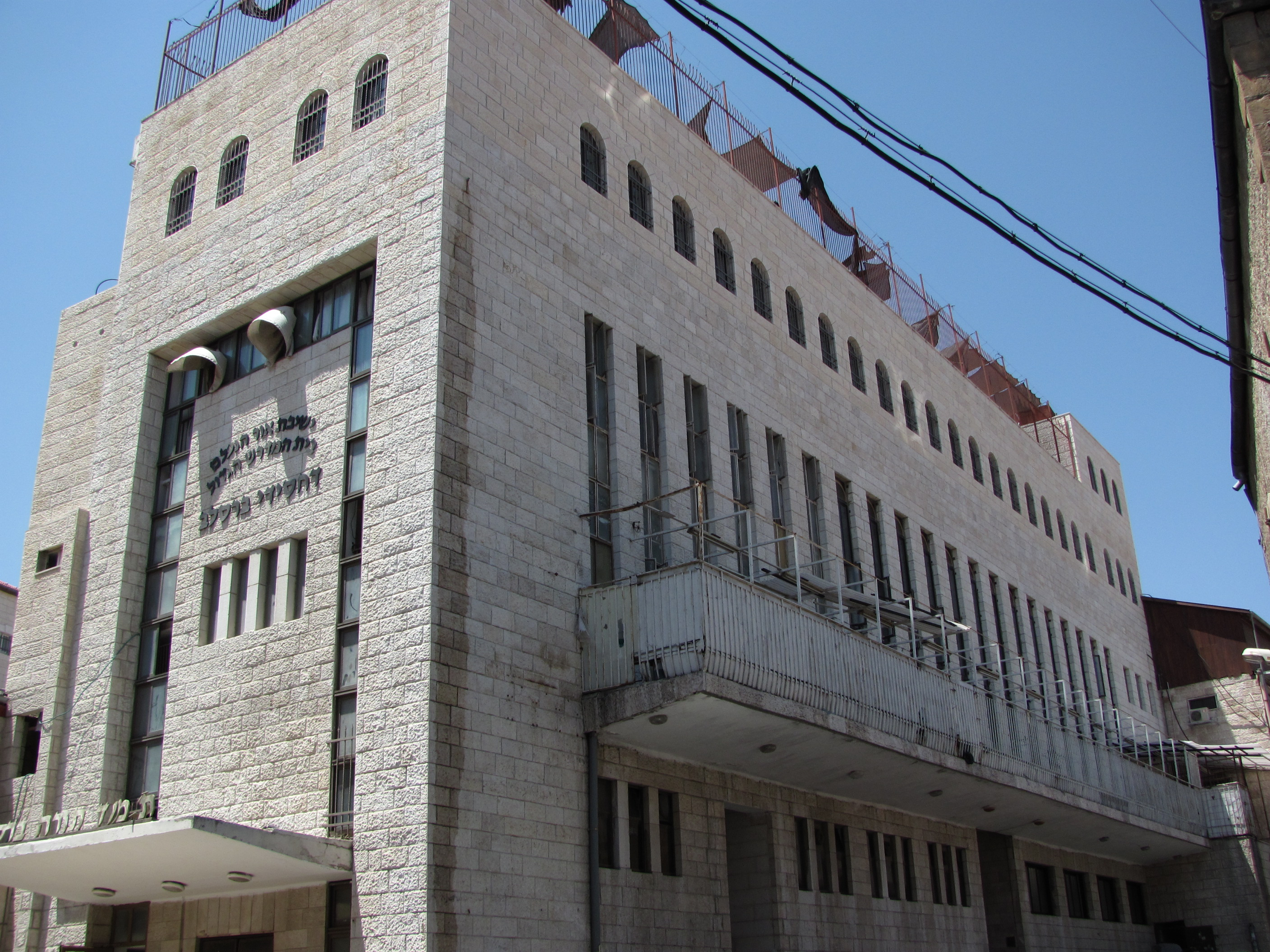
The Breslov Yeshiva and Synagogue in Mea Shearim, Jerusalem.

In 1937, he founded the Breslover Yeshiva in the Old City and served as its rosh yeshiva.

Sixteen years later, he spearheaded the construction of a larger Breslover synagogue and yeshiva in Meah Shearim. His ambitious plans for a four-story structure were ridiculed by some, since there were only about 150 Breslover Hasidim in the entire country at the time. Today, however, the building is not large enough to house the many people who come to it for prayers and study. The yeshiva building also operates gemachs (free-loan funds) for needy families, medical expenses and general loans.

Beyond his responsibilities as rosh yeshiva, Rosen was a central address for all who sought a sympathetic ear for their problems and worries. Invariably visitors would leave his study wondering what had bothered them so much in the first place. The problems didn't disappear, but Rosen was able to cut away all the surrounding anxieties and pressures and zero in on the one issue that the person needed to work on to improve his situation. Rosen often explained, "The Torah has five Books. The Shulchan Aruch has four volumes. What happened to the fifth volume? That corresponds to one's common sense, knowing where and how to apply your knowledge."

Weakened by typhus and other ailments during his youth, Rosen nevertheless radiated strength, joy and serenity throughout his life. Even when he grew very weak near the end of his life, he arose every night at midnight to recite the Tikkun Chatzot (Midnight Lament) and practiced hitbodedut regularly. When people asked him how he found the strength to pursue these rigorous devotions, he answered, "If you get used to it when you are young, it comes automatically after so many years." In the last year of his life, when he was bedridden most of the time, he remarked, "What would I be able to do now, if I didn't have Rebbe Nachman's advice of hitbodedut?"

== See also ==
- Nachman of Breslov
- Levi Yitzchok Bender
