= Shmuel Horowitz =

Shmuel Horowitz may refer to:

- Shmelke of Nikolsburg (1726–1778), also known as Shmuel Shmelke Halevi Horowitz, early Hasidic Rebbes
- Shmuel Horowitz (publisher) (1903–1973), compiler and publisher of Chayey Moharan, a biography of Rabbi Nachman of Breslov
- Shemp Howard, comedian, actor and talent agent

== See also ==
- Shmuel Hurwitz (1901-1999), Israeli agronomist
