= Yitzchok Sternhartz =

Ukrainian Breslov Hasid

Yitzchok Sternhartz (1808–1871) was the second eldest son of Nathan of Breslov. He was born in the town of Nemyriv, Ukraine, northwest of Bratslav), where his father was a disciple of Nachman of Breslov.

== Biography ==
Sternhartz married at the age of 15 and moved to his wife's home in Cherkasy, Ukraine. The couple divorced in 1825. He remarried in 1826, to a woman whose family was opposed to Hasidic Judaism.

== Death ==
Sternhartz immigrated to the Holy Land in the summer of 1868, reaching Ottoman Syria. He died in Safed in 1871.

== See also ==
- Breslov (Hasidic dynasty)
