= Talking to God =

2020 film by Maya Batash about spirituality

Talking to God is a 2020 independent comedy-drama film which follows a woman's journey to faith. Filmed in New York and Uman, Ukraine, it was written and directed by Maya Batash. The film is partially based on her own experience of traveling to Uman and partially on a story by the 18th-century sage Nachman of Breslov.

== Plot ==
Rebecca cannot sleep and feels her life is going nowhere. She travels to Uman, Ukraine for a spiritual awakening. There she finds like-minded women who humorously and dramatically recount their life struggles. The film morphs into a modern version of the Nachman of Breslov story of "The Fixer" about a poor man who nevertheless is always happy.

A wealthy and ill-tempered movie mogul (Sean Haberle) vows to find the secret of the Fixer's (Zebedee Row) happiness and tries to ruin his life. Yet both he and Rebecca find that the true source of happiness is from within and by connecting to a higher power, not from material wealth or success.

== Reception ==
It won two awards at the Florida Comedy Film Festival for Best Director, Feature Film (Maya Batash), and Best Actor, Feature Film (Zebedee Row). It also won an award for Best Actor (Sean Haberle) at MiraBan UK Film Festival. Batash was quoted as saying "I wanted to make a funny and fantastical trip of a film about the experience I had and all I learned along the way. Though it's a fictional story about a filmmaker with troubles who travels and dreams about a fixer and a king and spiritual surgeon. It's really a film about how to be happy."
