= Breslov Research Institute =

Breslov Research Institute is a publisher of classic and contemporary Breslov texts in English. Established in 1979, BRI produced the first English translation of all the works of Rebbe Nachman of Breslov (1772–1810) and selected works of Reb Noson (1780–1844), the Rebbe's closest disciple; studies of the Rebbe's teachings on individual subjects; contemporary Breslov biographies; and self-help books which apply Rebbe Nachman's teachings to daily life. In 2009 BRI had over 100 titles in print, many of which it has also translated into Hebrew, Spanish, Russian, and French. BRI maintains offices in Jerusalem and New York City.

== History ==
The founding of Breslov Research Institute was an outgrowth of the outreach work of Rabbi Zvi Aryeh Rosenfeld, who is credited with bringing the teachings of Rebbe Nachman to American shores beginning in the late 1940s. While Rabbi Rosenfeld primarily taught students in the New York area and recorded his lectures on tape, he encouraged one of his students, Rabbi Aryeh Kaplan, to produce an English translation of a key Breslov text, Shivchei V'Sichot HaRan (Rabbi Nachman's Wisdom), in 1973, which Rabbi Rosenfeld edited. In 1979, one year after Rabbi Rosenfeld's death, his son-in-law Chaim Kramer established the Breslov Research Institute to continue publishing Breslov teachings in English.

=== 1980s ===
In the 1980s, BRI produced the first English translations of important Breslov texts, including:

- Rabbi Nachman's Stories (translation and commentary of Sippurey Ma'asiyot, Rebbe Nachman's parables and stories)
- Rabbi Nachman's Tikkun (on the Tikkun HaKlali)
- Tzaddik (translation of Chayey Moharan)
- Advice (translation of Likutey Eitzot)
- The Aleph-Bet Book (translation of Sefer HaMiddot)

BRI also published Until the Mashiach, an annotated chronology of the life of Rebbe Nachman, and Crossing the Narrow Bridge, which spelled out the main concepts of Breslov Hasidut .

Beginning in 1984, BRI undertook the translation, annotation and commentary of Rebbe Nachman's magnum opus, Likutey Moharan. In 2012, the 15th and final volume of the set was published.

=== 1990s ===
During the 1990s, BRI produced a definitive biography of Reb Noson, the Rebbe's closest disciple (Through Fire and Water), and translated and compiled Reb Noson's prolific letters in a 4-volume set (Eternally Yours).

=== 2000s ===
In the 2000s, BRI produced the first English translation of the Kitzur Likutey Moharan (Abridged Likutey Moharan) and compilations of Breslov teachings on Pirkei Avot and the Chumash. A collection of the Rebbe's teachings on tzedakah (charity) was published as More Blessed To Give, and a collection of personal histories of men who traveled to Uman for the annual Rosh Hashana pilgrimage to Rebbe Nachman's grave was published as Rebbe Nachman and the Knights of the Rosh HaShanah Table. In 2014 the Breslov Siddur (weekday edition) was published, followed by the Shabbos/Yom Tov edition in 2018. The first volume of an elucidated English translation of Likutey Halakhot was printed in 2019.

To date, BRI has published all the writings of Rebbe Nachman and selected writings of Reb Noson. A multi-volume translation of Reb Noson's Likutey Tefilot (Collected Prayers) has been published under the title The Fiftieth Gate. BRI has also published original works by contemporary Breslov authors presenting Rebbe Nachman's teachings on prayer, hitbodedut, tefillin, Shabbat, Jewish holidays, Mashiach, the Land of Israel, the Sefirot, and Uman (burial place of Rebbe Nachman). It has produced a series of illustrated children's books based on Rebbe Nachman's parables.

BRI has produced a number of audio recordings of traditional Breslov songs and melodies, plus two books of Breslov sheet music.
