= Mashal (allegory) =

Biblical parable or allegory

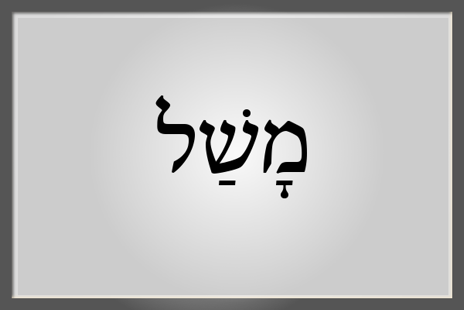
Mashal: Hebrew characters of the word

A mashal (Hebrew: משל) is a short proverb or parable with a moral lesson or religious allegory, called a nimshal. Mashal is used also to designate other forms in rhetoric, such as the fable and apothegm. Talmud Scholar Daniel Boyarin has recently defined "mashal" as a process of "exemplification," seeing it as the sine qua non of Talmudic hermeneutics. He quotes Song of Songs Rabba: "until Solomon invented the משל, no one could understand Torah at all." The phenomenon has been compared to the more recent phenomenon of sampling in modern popular music, especially hip-hop.

== Biblical proverbs and parables ==
The Tanakh contains many parables (and also a few symbolic stories, such as Ezekiel 3:24-26, 4:1-4, and 14:3-5). Some of these parables are:

- Of the trees who wished to crown themselves a king, the fruitful trees not wishing to abandon their functions except for the bramble (Judges 9:7-20); intended to illustrate the futility of crowning kings.
- Of the poor man who had raised a single lamb which a wealthy neighbor took to set before a guest (2 Samuel 12:1-4); intended to illustrate the sin which David had committed with Bathsheba, Uriah's wife.
- Of the wise woman of Tekoah, who induced David to make peace with his son Absalom (2 Samuel 14:6-8).
- Of the prophet's disciple, showing Ahab the wrong course which he had adopted toward Ben-hadad (1 Kings 20:39-40).
- Of the vineyard which does not thrive despite the care bestowed upon it (Isaiah 5:1-6), illustrating Israel's degeneracy.
- Of the farmer who does not plough continually, but prepares the field and sows his seed, arranging all his work in due order (Isaiah 28:24-28); intended to show the methodical activity of God.

In the prophets, four proverbs are mentioned which relate to Babylon in some way:

- The taunting riddle (Habakkuk 2:6-20)
- The riddle to the house of Israel (Ezekiel 17:1-10)
- The parable to the rebellious house (Ezekiel 24:3-14)
- The parable against the king of Babylon (Isaiah 14:4-21)

All these proverbs and parables were based on conditions familiar at the time; and even the event described in 2 Samuel 14:6-8 was probably no rare occurrence, in view of the custom which then prevailed of avenging bloodshed.

== In the Talmud ==
A large number of parables are found in post-Biblical literature, in Talmud and Midrash. The Talmudic writers believed in the pedagogic importance of the parable, and regarded it as a valuable means of determining the true sense of the Law and of attaining a correct understanding thereof (Shir haShirim Rabbah. 1:8). Rabban Yoḥanan ben Zakkai is said to have studied parables and fables side by side with the Miḳra, Mishnah, Halakah, Haggadah, etc. (Baba Batra 134a; Sukka 28a), and R. Meïr used to divide his public discourses into halakah, haggadah, and parables (Sanhedrin 38b).

In the Talmud and Midrash almost every religious idea, moral maxim, or ethical requirement is accompanied by a parable which illustrates it. Among the religious and moral tenets which are thus explained may be mentioned the following:

- the existence of God (Midrash Bereshit Rabba 34:1)
- His manner of retribution, and of punishing sins both in this world and in the next (Avodah Zarah 4a; Yalkut, Lev. 464; Shabbat 152a)
- His faithful governance (Avodah Zarah 55a; Sanhedrin 108a)
- His impatience of injustice (Sukkka 30a)
- His paternal leniency (Shemot Rabbah 46:6)
- His relation to Israel (Shemot Rabbah 46:4; Ber. 32a)
- Israel's sufferings (Berakhot 13a)
- the folly of idolatry (Avodah Zarah 54b-55a)
- the Law as the guardian and faithful protector in life (Sotah 21a)
- the sin of murder (Mekhilta., Yitro, 8 [ed. Weiss, p. 78a])
- the resurrection (Sanhedrin 91a)
- the value of benevolence (Baba Batra 10a)
- the worth of a just man for his contemporaries (Megillah 15a)
- the failure of popularity as a proof of intrinsic value (Sotah 40a)
- the evil tendency of freedom from anxiety (Berakhot 32a)
- the limitations of human knowledge and understanding (Sanhedrin 39a)
- the advantage frequently resulting from what appears to be evil (Niddah 31a)
- conversion (Shabbat 153a)
- purity of soul and its reward (Shabbat 152b).

Although the haggadists took the material for their parables from conditions of life with which their hearers were familiar, yet they selected details to which Biblical allusions were found to apply; since in certain cases the idea underlying the parable was already well known to their auditors. Thus, parables dealing with kings were frequently chosen to illustrate God's relation to the world in general and to Israel in particular, as in Bamidbar Rabbah 2:24, since the idea of the God-king had been made familiar to the people by the Bible (Ps. 10:16; Zeph. 3:16; Zech. 14:16–17; Mal. 1:14).

Israel is the first-born of the Lord (Ex. 4:22; Deut. 14:1); there are accordingly many parables of a king who had a son who was very dear to him (Berakhot 13a; Devarim Rabbah 3:12; Shemot Rabbah 19:8), which illustrate God's relation to Israel. This relation is also frequently illustrated by the parable of a king who had a beloved or a wife (e.g., Bamidbar 2:14–15; Devarim Rabbah 3:9,11,16), since, according to Isa. 54:5, Jer. 2:2, and Hosea 2:18, 21–22, Israel is the bride of God, His wife, whom He loves, and whom He always takes back, although He may at times disown her and cast her off.

The attitude of God toward Israel is illustrated with especial frequency by the parable of a king who had a vineyard in which he planted fine vines (e.g., Bamidbar Rabbah 15:18, and in Midrash Tanḥuma in most of the weekly sections), on account of the comparison of Israel to the vineyard of God (Isa. 5:1–7), and to the noble vine which He planted (Jer. 2:21). Similarly, the flight of the prophets Jonah from God is illustrated by the parable of the servant who runs away from his master (Mekhilta, Bo, i. [ed. Weiss, 1b]), since the idea that a prophet is a servant of God was familiar to the people from Isa. 20:3, 1.10.

The following Talmudic parables may be quoted to show the manner in which the writers employed this form of argument:

== Examples ==
=== The pagan philosopher ===
A pagan philosopher once asked R. Gamaliel why God is angry with idolaters and not with idols, whereupon R. Gamaliel answered him with the following parable: "A king had a son who raised a dog which he named after his royal father; and whenever he was about to swear he said, 'By the life of the dog, the father.' When the king heard of this, against whom did his anger turn, against the dog or against the son? Surely only against the son" (Avodah Zarah 54b).

=== The trustworthy man ===
Once Akiba was asked to explain why persons afflicted with disease sometimes returned cured from a pilgrimage to the shrine of an idol, though it was surely powerless. His answer was the following parable: "There was a man in a certain city who enjoyed the confidence of all his fellow citizens to such a degree that without witnesses they entrusted deposits to him, with the exception of one man in the city who always made his deposits before a witness. One day, however, this distrustful man forgot his caution, and gave the other a deposit without a witness. The wife of the trustworthy man attempted to induce him to deny having received a deposit from the distrustful man, as a punishment for his suspicion; but the husband said: 'Shall I deny my rectitude because this fool acts in an unseemly fashion?' Thus it is with the sufferings inflicted by Heaven upon man, which have a day and an hour appointed for their end. If it happens that a man goes on that day to the idol's shrine, the sufferings are tempted not to leave him, but they say, 'Shall we not fulfil our obligation to leave this fool, although he has behaved with folly?'" (Avodah Zarah 55a).

=== Emperor Antoninus ===
Emperor Antoninus asked Rabbi how there could be punishment in the life beyond, for, since body and soul after their separation could not have committed sin, they could blame each other for the sins committed upon earth, and Rabbi answered him by the following parable: "A certain king had a beautiful garden in which was excellent fruit; and over it he appointed two watchmen, one blind and the other lame. The lame man said to the blind one, 'I see exquisite fruit in the garden. Carry me thither that I may get it; and we will eat it together.' The blind man consented and both ate of the fruit. After some days the lord of the garden came and asked the watchmen concerning the fruit. Then the lame man said, 'As I have no legs I could not go to take it'; and the blind man said, 'I could not even see it.' What did the lord of the garden do? He made the blind man carry the lame, and thus passed judgment on them both. So God will replace the souls in their bodies, and will punish both together for their sins" (Sanhedrin 91a, b).

La Fontaine, in his "Fables," ascribes this parable to Confucius.

=== The Parable of the Banquet ===
Johanan b. Zakkai illustrates the necessity of daily conversion and of constant readiness to appear before God in heaven by the following parable: "A king invited his servants to a banquet without stating the exact time at which it would be given. Those who were wise remembered that all things are ever ready in the palace of a king, and they arrayed themselves and sat by the palace gate awaiting the call to enter, while those who were foolish continued their customary occupations, saying, 'A banquet requires great preparation.' When the king suddenly called his servants to the banquet, those who were wise appeared in clean raiment and well adorned, while those who were foolish came in soiled and ordinary garments. The king took pleasure in seeing those who were wise, but was full of anger at those who were foolish, saying that those who had come prepared for the banquet should sit down and eat and drink, but that those who had not properly arrayed themselves should stand and look on" (Shab. 153a). Similar parables expressing the same thought are found in the New Testament (Matt. 22:10–12, 25:1–12; Luke 12:36).

Another parable may be cited from the Jerusalem Talmud (Talmud Yerushalmi), which is found in the New Testament also. When R. Ḥiyya's son, R. Abin, died at the early age of twenty-eight, R. Zera delivered the funeral oration, which he couched in the form of the following parable: "A king had a vineyard for which he engaged many laborers, one of whom was especially apt and skilful. What did the king do? He took this laborer from his work, and walked through the garden conversing with him. When the laborers came for their hire in the evening, the skilful laborer also appeared among them and received a full day's wages from the king. The other laborers were angry at this and said, 'We have toiled the whole day, while this man has worked but two hours; why does the king give him the full hire, even as to us?' The king said to them: 'Why are you angry? Through his skill he has done more in the two hours than you have done all day.' So is it with R. Abin b. Ḥiyya. In the twenty-eight years of his life he has learned more than others learn in 100 years. Hence he has fulfilled his life-work and is entitled to be called to paradise earlier than others from his work on earth; nor will he miss aught of his reward" (Talmud Yerushalmi Berakhot 2. 5c). In Matt. 20. 1-16 this parable is intended to illustrate the doctrine that the heathen who have accepted Christianity have equal rights with the Jews in the kingdom of heaven.

Other interesting parables of the Talmud are found in Kiddushin 2b; Niddah 31b; Baba Kama 60b; Baba Batra 16a; Berakhot 7b, 9b; Yoma 38b-39a; Sukka 29a; Megilla 14a; Moed Katan 21b; Hagiga 12b; Ta'anit 5b-6a; Sanhedrin 96a.

== In the Midrash ==
Parables occur with even greater frequency in the Midrash than in the Talmud, one or more parables being found in nearly every section in Midrash Rabbah as well as in Tanḥuma. It is not necessary to quote any of these, since they are used in the same way as in the Talmud, and the examples cited from the Talmud may serve also as specimens of midrashic parables, especially as nearly all of those quoted are found in the Midrash as well. The parables of both the Talmud and the Midrash, reflecting the characteristics of the life of their time, are a valuable aid in studying the cultural history of that period; Ziegler has shown, e.g., that the parables dealing with kings reflect the conditions of the Roman empire. The same statement holds true in the case of the other parables of the Talmud and Midrash, which likewise mirror their time; for it may be assumed that the haggadists who made use of the form of the parable were intimately acquainted with the conditions upon which they drew for illustration, although they may have colored those conditions to suit their purposes.

The teachers, philosophers of religion, and preachers of the post-Talmudic period also had recourse to the parable to illustrate their meaning, such as Bachya ibn Pakuda in his "Chovot ha-Levavot – Duties of the heart" (ii. 6, iii. 9), Judah ha-Levi in his "Kuzari" (i. 109), and Leon of Modena (comp. Azulai, "Shem ha-Gedolim," s.v.).

In the eighteenth century Jacob ben Wolf Kranz of Dubno (Dubner Maggid) was especially noted as a composer of parables, introducing them frequently into his sermons. His homiletic commentaries on the Pentateuch and on certain other books of the Old Testament contain many parables taken from life and which serve to illustrate the condition of the Jews of his time.

== See also ==
- The Rooster Prince
