= Abraham Chazan =

Russian rabbi (1849–1917)

Abraham Chazan (1849–1917) was a rabbi and key figure in the transmission of Breslover Hasidut at the turn of the 20th century.

== Biography ==
He was born in Tulchyn, Ukraine to Rabbi Nachman Chazan, the closest disciple of Nathan of Breslov ("Reb Noson"), who in turn was the closest disciple of Rebbe Nachman of Breslov. Rabbi Nachman Chazan (also known as Reb Nachman Tulchyner) assumed the leadership of the Breslover community in Uman, Ukraine after Reb Noson's death and published the rest of his teacher's existing manuscripts, including the eight-volume Likutei Halakhot.

Abraham Chazan was a deeply devout young man who often left home right after the Jewish Sabbath to meditate and study in the forest for the entire week, subsisting only on a sack of bread.

== Publications ==
Few of his scholarly works survive; the most well-known is Biyur HaLikutim, an incisive and profound commentary on Rebbe Nachman's two-part collection of teachings, Likutey Moharan. Only part of this work was published in Chazan's lifetime; the first complete edition was published in 1935 by Rabbi Shmuel Horowitz and an amended and annotated edition was issued in 1989 by Rabbi Mordechai Frank. Notwithstanding his profound grasp of Rebbe Nachman's teachings, Chazan said about the Rebbe's simple conversations: "I hope that 10,000 years after the Resurrection, I will be worthy of understanding even one of Rebbe Nachman's statements the way the Rebbe himself understood it in this world!"

After his father died in 1884, Chazan began to write down all the stories and Breslover traditions that he had heard from him. These historical anecdotes, along with stories about many of Rebbe Nachman's followers, formed the basis for his books, Kochavei Or (Stars of Light, 5 sections) and Sichot V'Sippurim (Lessons and Stories). Yemey HaTla'os (Days of Affliction), originally published as the fifth section of Kochavei Or in 1933. It was subsequently distributed as a separate pamphlet, detailed the persecution of Reb Noson and Breslover Hasidim by followers of other Rebbes from 1835 to 1839. He also wrote a number of prayers in the manner of Reb Noson's Likutey Tefilot. These were published as Sason V’Simchah.

== Aliyah to Israel ==
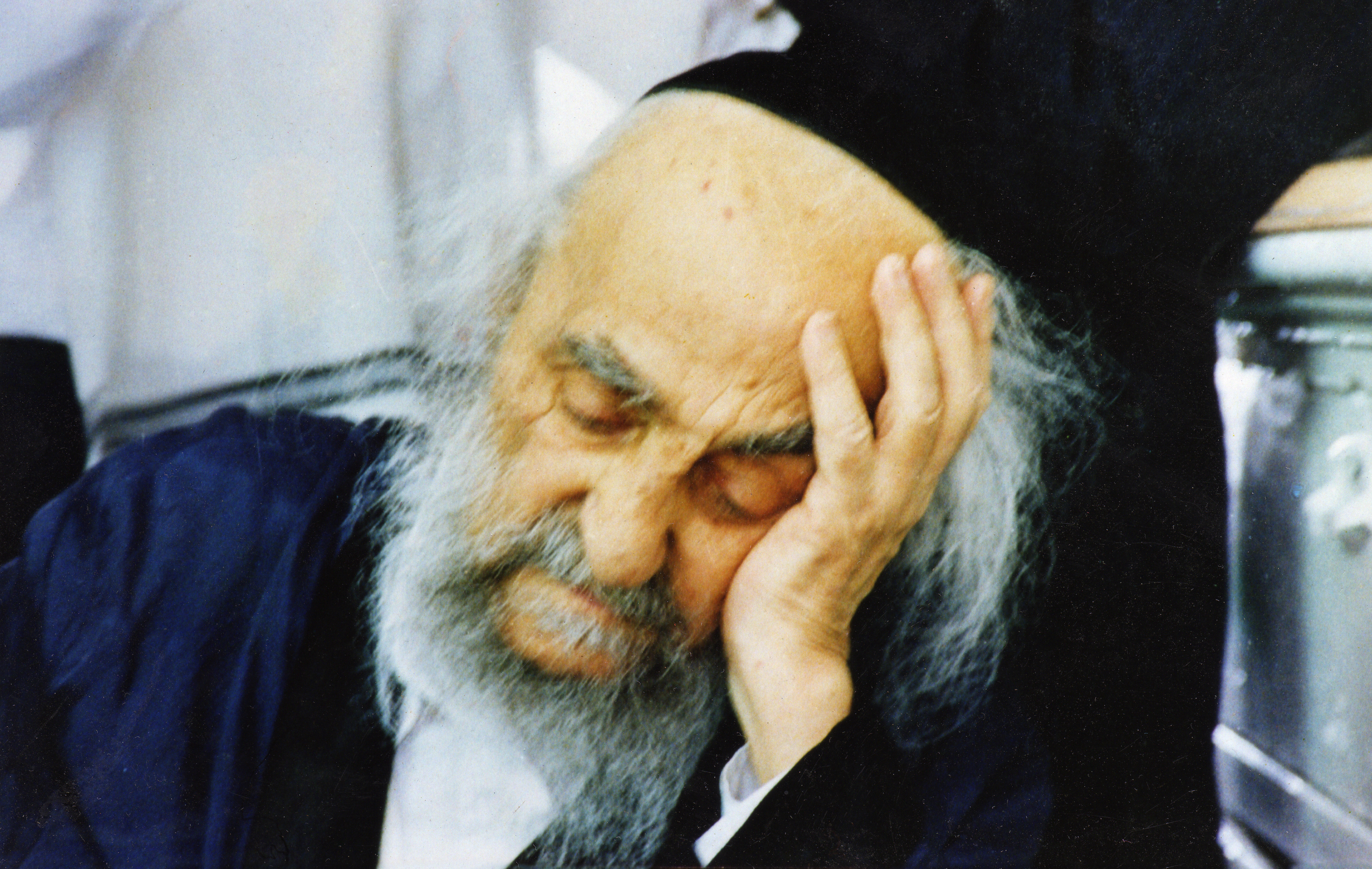
Rabbi Levi Yitzchok Bender.

Chazan emigrated to Jerusalem around 1894. However, he returned to Uman each year for the annual Breslover Rosh Hashana kibbutz (prayer gathering). In 1914, the outbreak of World War I forced him to remain in Russia, where he lived and taught until his death in 1917. His students in Uman, Rabbi Levi Yitzchok Bender and Rabbi Eliyahu Chaim Rosen, became leaders of the next generation of Breslover Hasidim after they emigrated from Uman to Jerusalem.

== See also ==
- Breslov (Hasidic dynasty)
- Nachman of Breslov
- Nathan of Breslov
- Nachman Chazan
