= Feige bat Udel =

Personal life
- Born: Medzhybizh, Ukraine
- Died: 19 Adar
- Spouse: Simchah Horodenker
- Children: Yechiel; Yisrael "Meit" ("the dead one"); Nachman of Breslov
- Parents: Yechiel Michel Ashkenazi (father); Udel (mother)

Religious life
- Religion: Judaism

Feige "the Prophetess", as she was called by her brothers, was the mother of the famed Rabbi Nachman of Breslov. She was the granddaughter of the Baal Shem Tov, the founder of Chasidism, through his daughter Udel.

Feige was said to have ruach hakodesh as is said of her mother Udel, and her grandfather the Baal Shem Tov. Rabbi Nachman's biography Chayey Moharan says "all the tzaddikim held her in high esteem as one possessing ruach hakodesh and great spiritual insight, particularly her renowned righteous brothers... [all the tzaddikim] regarded her as one of the prophetesses:

It came to pass in the year 5560 (1800), that our Master, may his memory be a blessing, saw and understood, in the place where he saw and comprehended, that he needed to establish his residence in the community of Zlatipolia. In that same year, at its end, on Rosh Chodesh Elul, he arranged a wedding for his daughter Adil, as previously mentioned, and the wedding took place in Khmelnik. He attended the wedding with all his household, as customary. At the wedding was his righteous mother, Mrs. Feiga, may her memory be a blessing. At the time of the *chuppah*, she saw the Baal Shem Tov, may his memory be a blessing, for she was a righteous woman endowed with divine spirit (ruach hakodesh. All the righteous people held her in high esteem as one possessing divine spirit and great spiritual insight, particularly her renowned righteous brothers: the holy Rabbi of Sedlikov and the holy Rabbi, our teacher, Rabbi Baruch, may their memories be a blessing. They all regarded her as one of the prophetesses.

Feige's first child was Yechiel, who is known as Rabbi Yechiel. Her second son was named Yisrael after her grandfather the Baal Shem Tov. He did not speak and got the nickname Yisrael Meit ("the dead one"). Many Chasidim tried to have a son and name him Yisrael to carry on the Besht's work, but failed for various reasons. Finally Rabbi Nachman was born, so he was named "Nachman", meaning "the comforter, the consolation".

Rabbi Nachman had a daughter whom he named Feige. She died while she was under the care of a wet nurse in Ladyzhyn and he was away on a trip for Shabbat Nachamu.
