= Tikkun HaKlali =

Set of ten Psalms whose recital serves as repentance for all sins

Tikkun HaKlali (Hebrew: תיקון הכללי, lit. 'The General (or Comprehensive) Rectification'), also known as The General Remedy, is a set of ten Psalms whose recital serves as teshuvah (repentance) for all sins — in particular the sin of "wasted seed" through involuntary nocturnal emission or masturbation. The Tikkun HaKlali is a unique innovation of Rebbe Nachman of Breslov, and its recital is a regular practice of Breslover Hasidim to this day.

== Form ==
The Tikkun HaKlali consists of the following ten Psalms said in this order: 16, 32, 41, 42, 59, 77, 90, 105, 137, and 150. Each recital is preceded by a paragraph expressing one's desire to bind himself to the tzadikim of all generations, especially Rebbe Nachman, and several verses which are customarily recited before any saying of Psalms. The recital of the ten Psalms is followed by a prayer composed by Reb Noson, the Rebbe's foremost disciple, asking God for forgiveness from sin.

== History ==
Rebbe Nachman first revealed the existence of a rectification for involuntary nocturnal emissions in 1805. At that time, he stated that any ten Psalms would serve as a rectification, since they correspond to the ten expressions of song and praise on which the Book of Psalms is based. These ten types of song are: Ashrei, Beracha, Maskil, Nitzuach, Shir, Niggun, Mizmor, Tefilla, Hoda'ah, and Halleluyah. In that lesson, Rebbe Nachman explained how some of these expressions stand in direct opposition to the kelipah (forces of evil), and therefore have the power to extract the wasted seed from the realm of unholiness.

Rebbe Nachman's main teaching on Tikkun HaKlali was given on Shavuot 5566 (May 23, 1806). Yet he did not reveal the specific ten Psalms of the Tikkun HaKlali until April 1810. At that time, Rebbe Nachman revealed the specific ten Psalms to two of his closest disciples, Rabbi Aharon of Breslov and Rabbi Naftali of Nemirov, making them witnesses for an unprecedented vow:

"Bear witness to my words: When my days are over and I leave this world, I will still intercede for anyone who comes to my grave, says these ten Psalms, and gives a penny to charity. No matter how great his sins, I will do everything in my power, spanning the length and breadth of the creation to cleanse and protect him.

"I am very positive in everything I say. But I am most positive in regard to the great benefit of these ten Psalms."

"These are the ten Psalms: 16, 32, 41, 42, 59, 77, 90, 105, 137, 150."

"This is the General Remedy. There is a specific remedy for each sin, but this is the general remedy."

"Go out and spread the teaching of the ten Psalms to all men."

"It may seem like an easy thing to say ten Psalms. But it will actually be very difficult in practice."

In the accompanying lesson, in which he enumerated and discussed the allusions of the specific ten Psalms, Rebbe Nachman asserted:

"Know that the ten Psalms which a person must recite on the very same day as he has an impure experience, God forbid, are: 16, 32, 41, 42, 59, 77, 90, 105, 137, 150. These ten Psalms are a very great remedy for this problem. One who is worthy of saying them on the same day need have no more fear whatsoever of the terrible blemish caused by an impure emission, because it has indubitably been corrected by this remedy without any doubt."

== Mystical meaning ==
The Tikkun HaKlali is based on the idea of the Brit (Covenant) which God made with the Jewish people. In return for absolute allegiance to God on the part of the nation, God promised to be their God and to give them the land of Israel as an inheritance (Genesis 17:7-8).

As a mark of this Covenant, God commanded Abraham to perform the mitzvah of brit milah (circumcision):

"This is My Covenant which you shall keep between Me and you and your seed after you: Every male among you shall be circumcised. And you shall be circumcised in the flesh of your foreskin, and it shall be a token of a Covenant between Me and you." (Genesis 17:10-11)

By choosing this specific organ to bear the sign of the Covenant, God indicated the tremendous power of the sexual organ. When it is used in the context of marriage, the sexual organ is elevated and man becomes a partner with God in creation. But when it is used for personal gratification, it distances a person from God and leaves him unfulfilled, frustrated and depressed. Rebbe Nachman taught that the antithesis of the joy one should feel by uniting with a marriage partner and performing all of God's other mitzvot is depression, a state which is in the domain of Lilith, the name of the kelipah associated with unholiness.

The Tikkun HaKlali comes to rectify the sin of misusing the sexual organ and, by extension, undoes the root feelings of depression that lie at the core of any sin. It does this through the power of Psalms (Tehillim in Hebrew), which are songs of praise and rejoicing in God.

The word Tehillim has the same gematria as the word Lilith (with five units added for each of the letters of Lilith). Moreover, the word Tehillim has the same gematria as the two names of God, El and Elohim, which have the power to release the seed from the kelipah. Further, these ten Psalms have been particularly identified in relation to the wasted seed being released from the forces of evil and rectification being completed.

== Other rectifications ==
Although the sin of wasted seed is considered the most serious of the violations of the Covenant, other sins also accomplish the same thing. Rebbe Nachman taught that one who earns his livelihood dishonestly also breaches the Covenant, as his craving for money can make him go so far as to rob his fellow man. The way one thinks, speaks and acts are also areas in which one can uphold or damage the Covenant.

Rebbe Nachman further taught that the Tikkun HaKlali can rectify all spiritual and physical flaws or maladies. He stated,

"There are places that are so fine and narrow that no remedy has the power to penetrate them except through the General Remedy, which injects healing into even the narrowest, finest places. First it is necessary to apply the General Remedy, and through this all the individual flaws will automatically be rectified."

For this reason, many Breslover Hasidim recite the Tikkun HaKlali every day. Women also recite it as a general rectification for sin. Its recital is a cornerstone of any visit to the Rebbe's grave, as per his promise.

Some Hasidim even say the Tikun Haklali at least once a week or even every day with and before the Prakim Nivrachim (Hebrew: פרקים נבחרים) – which are 10 supplemental Tehillim (31, 35, 36, 60, 68, 80, 83, 88, 89, 109) referring to the sufferings of the Moshiach (Messiah) before the geulah, the final redemption – in order to better 'clean off' the 'dust' or 'rust' remaining on the soul.

== Sources ==
- Greenbaum, Avraham, ed. (1984). Rebbe Nachman's Tikkun. Breslov Research Institute. ISBN 978-0-930213-06-0.
- Kaplan, Rabbi Aryeh, trans. (1973). Rabbi Nachman's Wisdom. Jerusalem: Breslov Research Institute.
