= Nachman Chazan =

Nachman Chazan (1813–1884) was a seminal figure in the continuation and growth of Breslov Hasidism in the mid-nineteenth century. His day of passing (Yortzeit/Hilula) is the 26th of Nissan.

== Breslov movement ==
The Breslov movement was founded by Rebbe Nachman of Breslov, who died in 1810. Rebbe Nachman's closest disciple, Nathan of Breslov (also known as "Reb Noson"), shaped and shepherded the movement until his own death in 1844. Reb Nachman Chazan, Reb Noson's closest disciple, then assumed leadership of the movement, guaranteeing the existence and growth of the Hasidut for another 40 years.

== Biography ==
Chazan, whose grandfather was a follower of Rebbe Nachman, was born three years after the Rebbe's death and was named after him. He was orphaned as a child and was raised by his uncle in Tulchyn, Ukraine. There, in 1822, he met Reb Noson as the latter was passing through on his pilgrimage to Israel. Reb Noson made such a deep impression on the 9-year-old boy that he decided to be close to him forever. When he grew up, Chazan became Reb Noson's closest disciple.

He moved to the town of Breslov, where Reb Noson had resided, and lived there for 18 years. Then he moved to Uman, Ukraine, the city in which Rebbe Nachman is buried, and lived there for another 18 years. This latter move shifted the focus of the movement away from the town of Breslov and onto the town of Uman, where it remains focused to this day.

Chazan was an extremely modest man whose actions belied his greatness in scholarship and spiritual devotions. He served as the shammes (sexton) of the Breslover synagogue in Uman and regularly filled the water buckets for the benefit of other worshipers. In recognition of his leadership, however, he was accorded the honor of leading the prayers at the annual Rosh Hashana kibbutz in Uman. His family name, Chazan, is derived from his position as chazzan (cantor) for those services.

Chazan's son, Rabbi Abraham Chazan, became one of the leading figures in the Breslov community after his father's death in 1884.

== Publications ==
Rabbi Nahman Chazan published the first volume of Reb Noson's magnum opus, Likutey Halachot, while the latter was still alive. After Reb Noson's death, Rabbi Nahman Chazan edited and published the remaining seven volumes of this work.

== See also ==
- Breslov (Hasidic dynasty)
- Nachman of Breslov
- Nathan of Breslov
- Abraham Chazan
