= Breslov =

Hasidic dynasty

Breslov Hasidic Dynasty
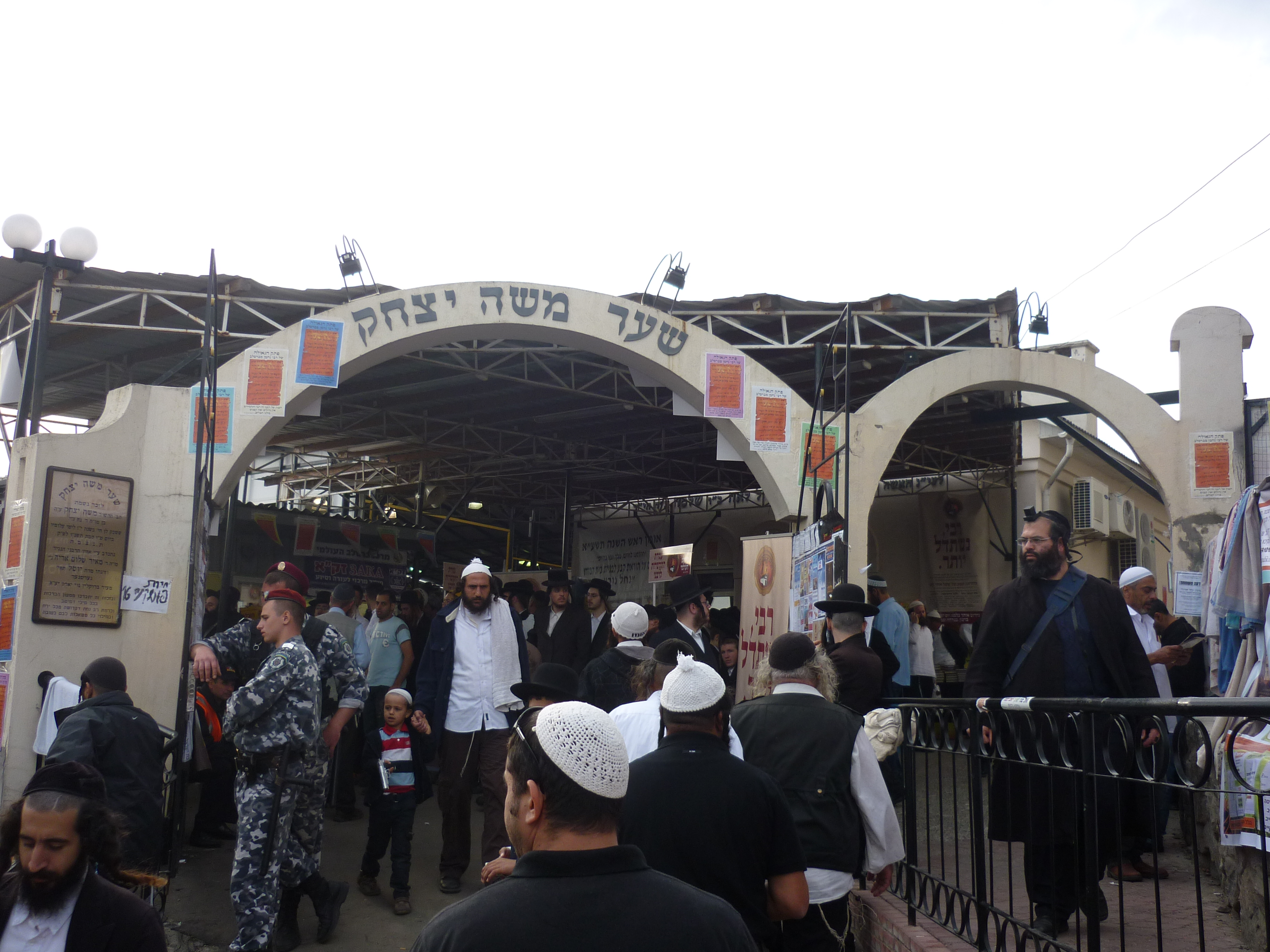
- Gravesite of Nachman of Breslov in Uman, Ukraine

Founder
- Nachman of Breslov

Regions with significant populations
- Israel, United States, Western Europe

Religions
- Hasidic Judaism

Breslov (also Bratslav and Breslev) is a branch of Hasidic Judaism founded by Nachman of Breslov (1772–1810), a great-grandson of the Baal Shem Tov, founder of Hasidism. Its adherents strive to develop an intense, joyous relationship with God and receive guidance toward this goal from the teachings of Nachman.

The movement has had no central, living leader for the past 200 years, as Nachman did not designate a successor. As such, Breslov adherents are sometimes referred to as the "dead Hasidim" (Yiddish: טויטע חסידים, romanized: toyte ḥasidim) since they have never had a formal Rebbe since Nachman's death. However, certain groups and communities under the Breslov banner refer to their leaders as "Rebbe".

The movement weathered strong opposition from virtually all other Hasidic movements in Ukraine throughout the 19th century, yet, at the same time, experienced growth in numbers of followers from Ukraine, Belarus, Lithuania, and Poland. By World War I, thousands of Breslov Hasidim lived in the region. After the Bolshevik Revolution, communist persecution forced the Breslov Hasidic movement underground in Russia. Thousands of Breslov Hasidim were imprisoned or executed during Joseph Stalin's Great Purge and later during the Nazi period, both before and after Germany's invasion of Soviet Russia in 1941. The movement was regenerated in the United Kingdom, the United States, and Israel by those who escaped the persecutions of Europe, with large numbers of Yemenite Jews and other Mizrahi Jews joining the sect.

== History ==
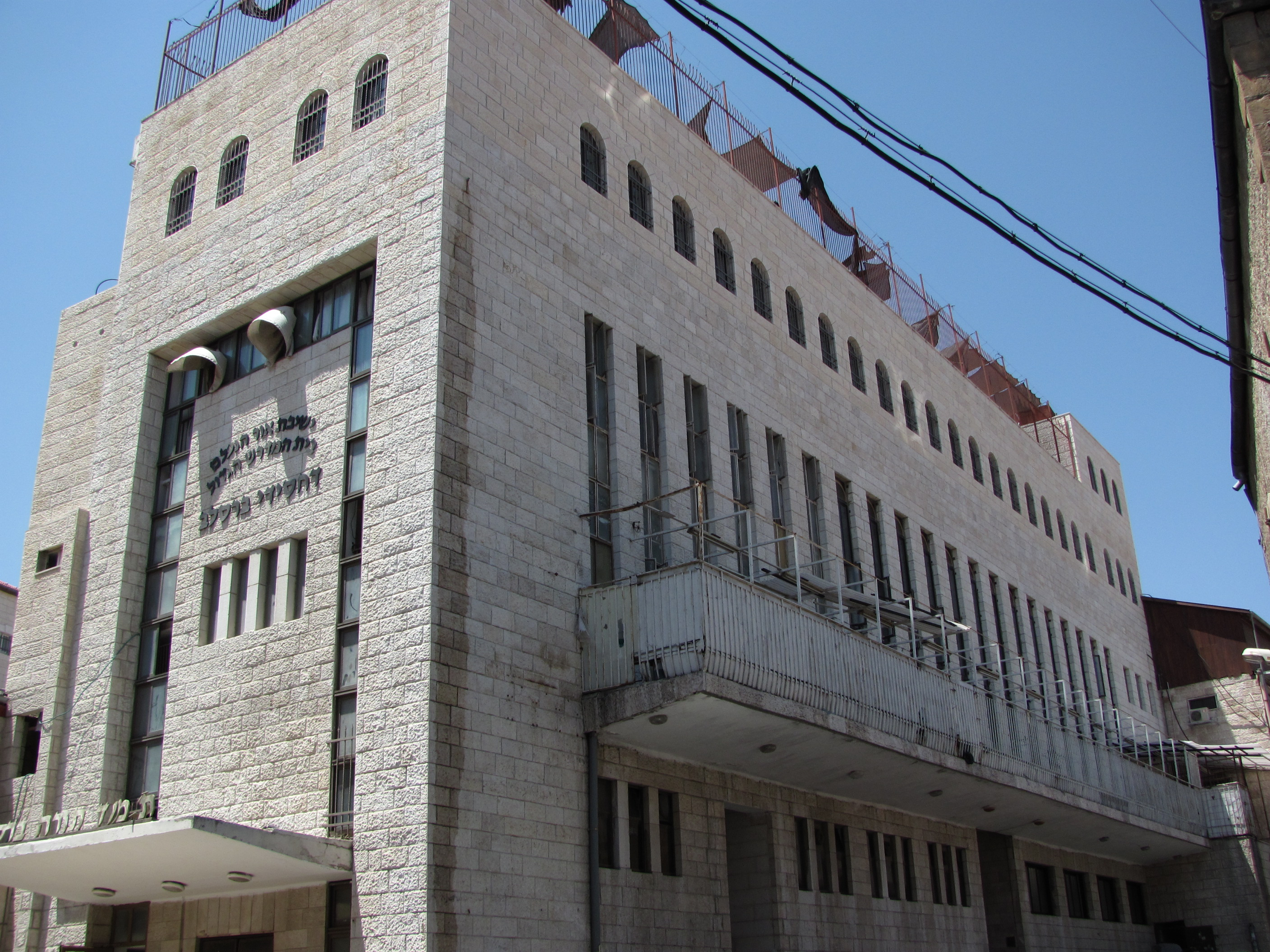
The Breslov Yeshiva and Synagogue in Mea Shearim, Jerusalem, established by Eliyahu Chaim Rosen in 1953

"Breslov" is the name used nowadays by Breslover followers for the town of Bratslav, where Nachman lived for the last eight years of his life before moving to Uman where he died. Bratslav is located on the Bug river in Ukraine (latitude 48.82 N., longitude 28.95 E.), midway between Tulchin to the south and Nemirov to the north—9 miles (14 kilometres) from each. Bratslav should not be confused with Wrocław, a city now located in Poland, called in German "Breslau", and also pronounced "Breslov" in Yiddish, which was a renowned Jewish center in its own right.

Prior to his arrival in Breslov in 1802, Nachman lived and taught in other towns in the Russian Empire, such as Ossatin, Medvedevka, Zlatopol, and Odessa. But upon his arrival in Breslov, he declared, "Today, we have planted the name of the Breslover Hasidim. This name will never disappear because my followers will always be called after the town of Breslov."

Later, followers said the name of the town dovetailed with Nachman's teachings. He encouraged Jews to remove the barriers that stood between themselves and a closer relationship with God. They noted that the Hebrew letters of the word Breslov (ברסלב) can be re-arranged to spell lev basar (לב בשר —the "ס" and "ש" sounds are interchangeable), "a heart of flesh", echoing the prophecy in Ezekiel (36:26): "I [God] will take away your heart of stone and give you a heart of flesh." (For this reason, some adherents spell the name of the Hasidut, "Breslev", stressing the lev (heart). Contemporary Breslov teacher Shmuel Moshe Kramer of Jerusalem also noted that the gematria ("numerical value") of the Hebrew letters of Breslov (ברסלב) is 294, as is the Hebrew spelling of Nachman ben Faiga (נחמן בן פיגא) (Nachman son [of] Faiga), the names of Nachman and his mother.

== Religious approach ==
Yisroel Ber Odesser, a Breslover Hasid from Tiberias who inspired the Na Nach movement

The Breslov approach places great emphasis on serving God through the sincerity of the heart, with much joy and living life as intensely as possible. Breslov's teachings particularly emphasize emunah (faith) and teshuvah (repentance) and that every Jew on any level of Divine service is required to yearn to return to God constantly, no matter how high or low they are situated on the spiritual echelon.

Breslover Hasidim see the study and fulfillment of Torah life as the means to a joyful existence, and their approach to worship is very personalized and emotional, with much clapping, singing, and dancing. Nachman said, "It is a great mitzvah [commandment or good deed] to always be happy". In this same lesson, he notes that even leading intellectuals in the medical field will attest to depression and bitterness being the main cause of most mental and physical ailments.

Breslov teachings emphasize the importance of drawing people to the "true tzadik" as the key to rectifying the world, overcoming evil, and bringing people closer to God, according to Nachman and Nathan of Breslov. In Breslov thought, the "true tzadik" is Nachman himself.

Nachman also emphasized Jewish prayer. Besides the regular daily services in the synagogue, Nachman advised his followers to engage in hitbodedut (literally, "self-seclusion"), on a daily basis. Nachman claimed that every true tzaddik attained his lofty spiritual level almost uniquely because of hitbodedut. Nachman explained that hitbodedut is the loftiest form of Divine service and that it is virtually impossible to be a good Jew without this practice. During hitbodedut, the individual pours out his thoughts and concerns to God in his mother tongue, as if talking to a close personal friend. The goal is to establish complete unification with God and a clearer understanding of one's personal motives and goals.

A sub-group of the Breslov sect, colloquially known as Na Nachs, uses the Na Nach Nachma Nachman Meuman mantra, which is based on a permutation of the Hebrew letters of Nachman's name. This mantra was not used by Nachman himself but was taught in the 20th century by Yisroel Ber Odesser. The NaNach movement, however, is highly controversial within the wider Breslov community because it places less emphasis on learning traditional Jewish texts such as the Talmud and more emphasis on ecstatic worship.

Nachman always maintained that his high spiritual level was due to his own efforts and not to his famous lineage or any other circumstances of his birth. He repeatedly insisted that all Jews could reach the same level as he and disagreed with those who thought that the main reason for a Rebbe's greatness was the superior level of his soul.

== The Rosh Hashana kibbutz ==
Another specifically Breslov practice is the annual Rosh Hashanah kibbutz, a large gathering at the grave of Nachman in Uman, Ukraine, on the Jewish New Year. Nachman himself said:

My Rosh Hashana is greater than everything. I cannot understand how it is that if my followers really believe in me, they are not all scrupulous about being with me for Rosh Hashana. No one should be missing! Rosh Hashana is my whole mission.

During his lifetime, hundreds of followers spent the holiday with him; after his death, his closest disciple, Nathan of Breslov, organized an annual pilgrimage to his grave, starting with Rosh Hashana 1811, the year after Nachman's death. Until World War I, thousands of Hasidim from Ukraine, Belarus, Lithuania, and Poland joined the holiday prayer gathering. The Rosh Hashana kibbutz operated clandestinely, and on a smaller scale, under Communism, when public prayer gatherings were forbidden. The pilgrimage was officially re-instituted after the fall of Communism in 1989, and continues to this day, with upwards of 70,000 men and boys arriving each Rosh Hashana from all over the world.

Breslovers also make individual pilgrimages to their Rebbe's grave at other times of the year. Visiting the grave at any time is deemed beneficial, because Nachman said:

Whoever comes to my gravesite and recites the Ten Psalms of the Tikkun HaKlali ("General Remedy"), and gives even as little as a penny to charity for my sake, then, no matter how serious his sins may be, I will do everything in my power—spanning the length and breadth of Creation—to cleanse and protect him. By his very payot ("sidecurls"), I will pull him out of Gehennom [purgatory]!

== Important books ==
The main Hasidic texts revered and studied by Breslover Hasidim are those written by Nachman and Nathan. All of Nachman's teachings were transcribed by Nathan. Additionally, Nathan wrote some of his own works.

Note that, at the same time, Breslovers do not restrict themselves to Nachman's commentaries on the Torah, but also study many of the classic texts, including the Tanakh, Talmud, Midrash, and many others. They may also study the writings of Rebbes from other dynasties. In fact, Nachman claimed that while even a complete simpleton can become a pure and righteous Jew, the ideal study schedule of an extremely scholarly Hasid should include the Tanakh (Hebrew Bible) with its commentaries, the entire Talmud with its commentaries, the entire Shulchan Aruch (code of law), all the Midrashic works, the Zohar and Tikkunei Zohar, the teachings of the Arizal, and other kabbalistic works, all over the course of a single year. Today, many Breslov hasidim practice a daily review of the Shulchan Aruch.

Nachman's magnum opus is the two-volume Likutei Moharan (Collected [Lessons] of Our Teacher, Rabbi Nachman), a collection of 411 lessons displaying in-depth familiarity and understanding of the many overt and esoteric concepts embedded in Tanakh, Talmud, Midrash, Zohar, and Kabbalah. In the introductory section of certain editions of Likutei Moharan, the book is likened to the Zohar itself, and Nachman is likened to the Zohar's supposed author, Shimon bar Yochai. This is based on the citation of numerous parallels between the lives of the two sages, as well as the fact that the names "Nachman ben Simcha" (Simcha being Nachman's father's name) and "Shimon ben Yochai" share the same gematria (numerical value) of 501.

Upon Nachman's instructions, Nathan collected all the practical teachings and advice contained in the Likutei Moharan, and published them in:

- Likutei Eitzot (Collected Advices)
- Kitzur Likutei Moharan (Abridged Likutei Moharan)

Nachman's other works include:

- Sefer HaMiddot (Book of Traits) – a collection of aphorisms on various character traits; also published in English as The Aleph-Bet Book
- Sipurei Ma`asiyot (Story Tales) – 13 mystical parables, also published in English as Rabbi Nachman's Stories, 13 Tales of Rabbi Nachman, Tales of Ancient Times.
- Tikkun HaKlali (The General Remedy) – a specific order of 10 Psalms which remedies p'gam habrit kodesh (blemish to the sign of the holy Covenant, i. e., the organ of procreation), and all sins in general.

After Nachman's death, Nathan wrote down all the conversations, fragments of lessons, and interactions that he and others had had with Nachman. He published these in the following collections:

- Shevachei HaRan (Praises of the Rav Nachman) and Sichot HaRan (Conversations of the Rav Nachman) – published in English as Rabbi Nachman's Wisdom
- Chayei Moharan (Life of Our Teacher, Rabbi Nachman) – published in English as The Life of Rabbi Nachman

Nathan also authored these commentaries and novellae:

- Likutei Halachot (Collected Laws) – an 8-volume Hasidic commentary on Shulchan Aruch which shows the interrelationship between every halakha and Nachman's lessons in Likutei Moharan.
- Likutei Tefillot (Collected Prayers) – 210 direct and heart-felt prayers based on the concepts in Likutei Moharan.
- Yemei Moharanat (The Days of Our Teacher, Rabbi Nathan) – an autobiography
- Alim LeTerufah (Leaves of Healing) – Nathan's collected letters
- Shemot HaTzaddikim (Names of Tzaddikim) – a list of the tzaddikim of Tanakh, Talmud, Midrash, Kabbalah, and Hasidut, and Geonim of Torah in general Nachman said about this that saying the names of the righteous in every generation is a great virtue and can change nature in favor of the one who said the names of the righteous.

Students of Nathan, their students, and their students' students added to Breslov literature, with further commentaries on Nachman's teachings, as well as original works. See for example Nachman Goldstein § Publications.

Beginning in the 1970s, Breslov works in English began to appear, most notably Aryeh Kaplan's Gems of Rabbi Nachman. The Breslov Research Institute, founded in Jerusalem in 1979, publishes authoritative translations, commentaries, and general works on Breslov Hasidut in the major languages spoken by modern-day Jewish communities: English, Hebrew, Spanish, and Russian.

The Breslov Siddur, published in a 2014 hard-cover edition (828 pages in length), is one of the few Hasidic siddurim available in an English language translation (and contains the original text). Translated by Avraham Sutton and Chaim Kramer.

== Today ==
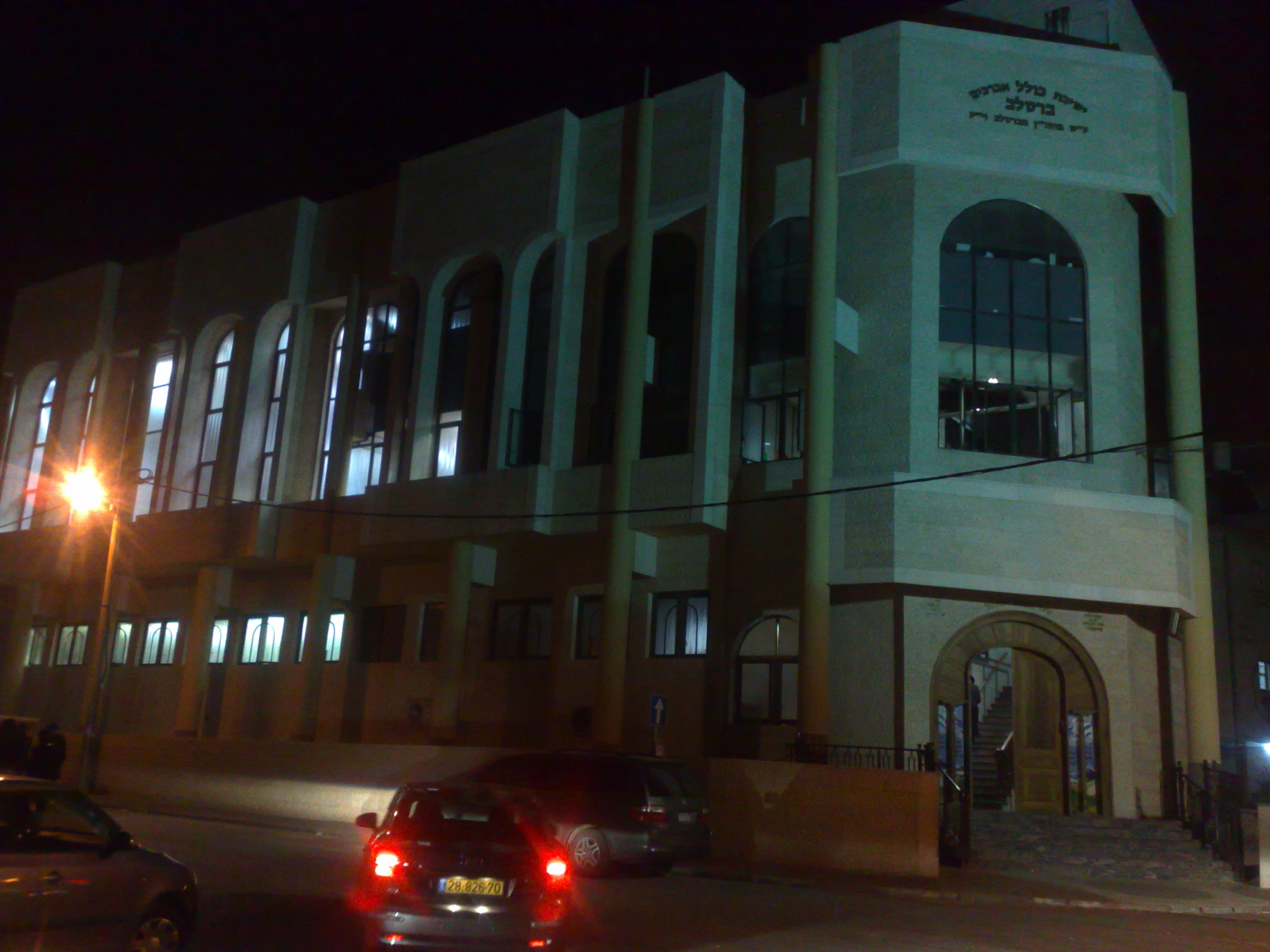
Breslov kollel in Bnei Brak

Today, Breslover communities exist in several locations in Israel, as well as in major cities around the world with large Jewish populations, including New York, Los Angeles, Paris, London, Montreal, and Lakewood Township, New Jersey. While there are no exact statistics, according to the Breslov Research Institute, the number of core adherents in Jerusalem and Bnei Brak amounts to several thousand families, and several tens in Safed.

The original Jerusalem community was founded by emigres from Ukraine in the late 19th century, and was joined by descendants of the Yerushami Yishuv haYashan (Old Yishuv in Jerusalem) community. It is built around the Breslov Yeshiva in Mea Shearim, founded by Eliyahu Chaim Rosen in 1953, which is referred to as the shul. It is affiliated with the Edah HaChareidis, and led by Yaakov Meir Shechter and Shmuel Moshe Kramer.

=== Outreach and growth ===
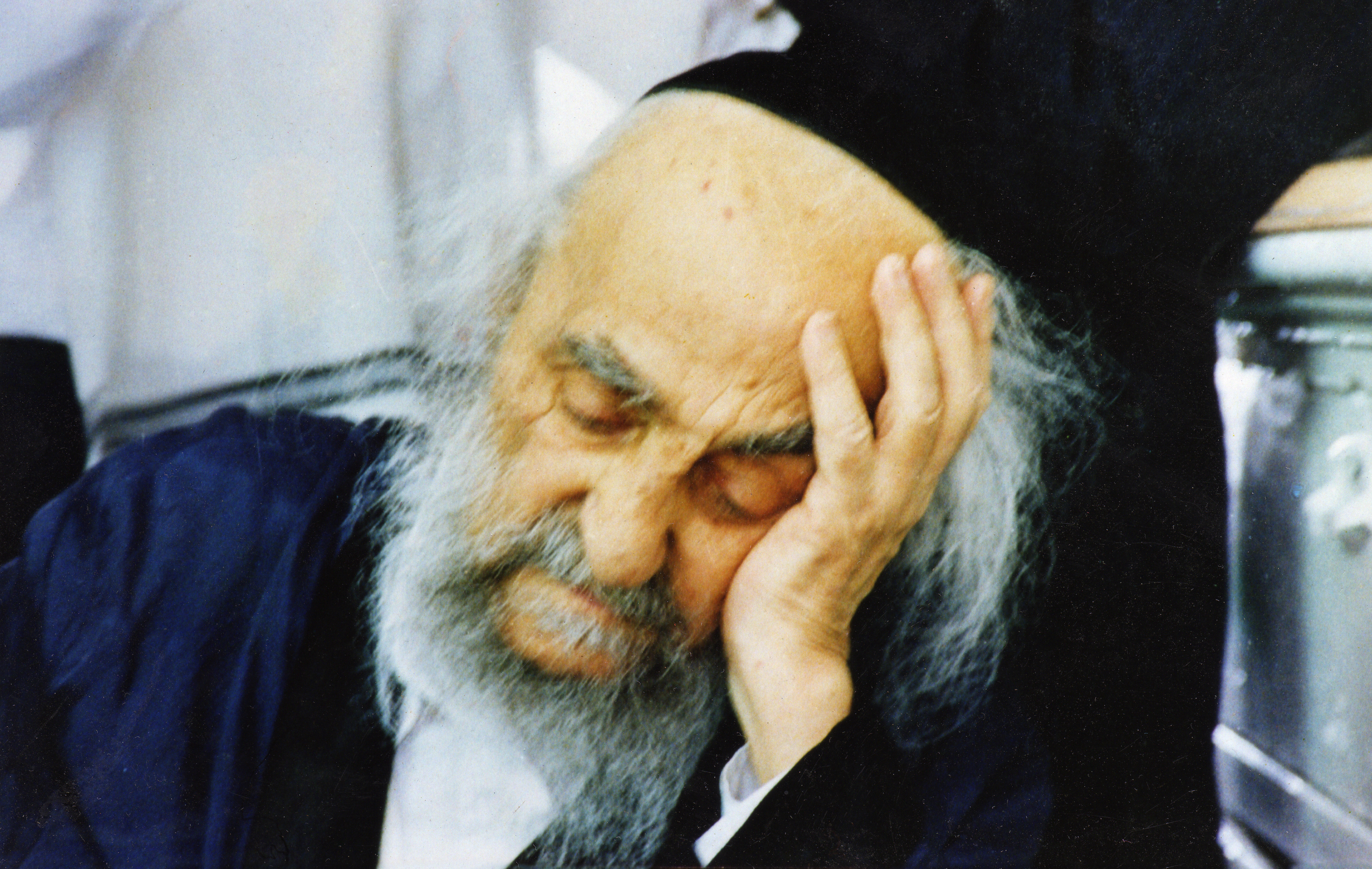
Levi Yitzchok Bender

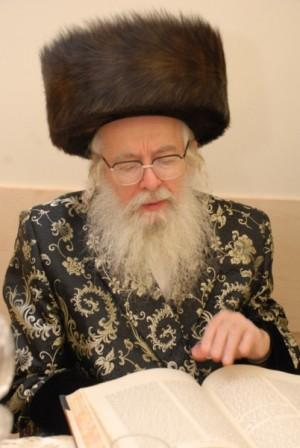
Eliezer Shlomo Schick

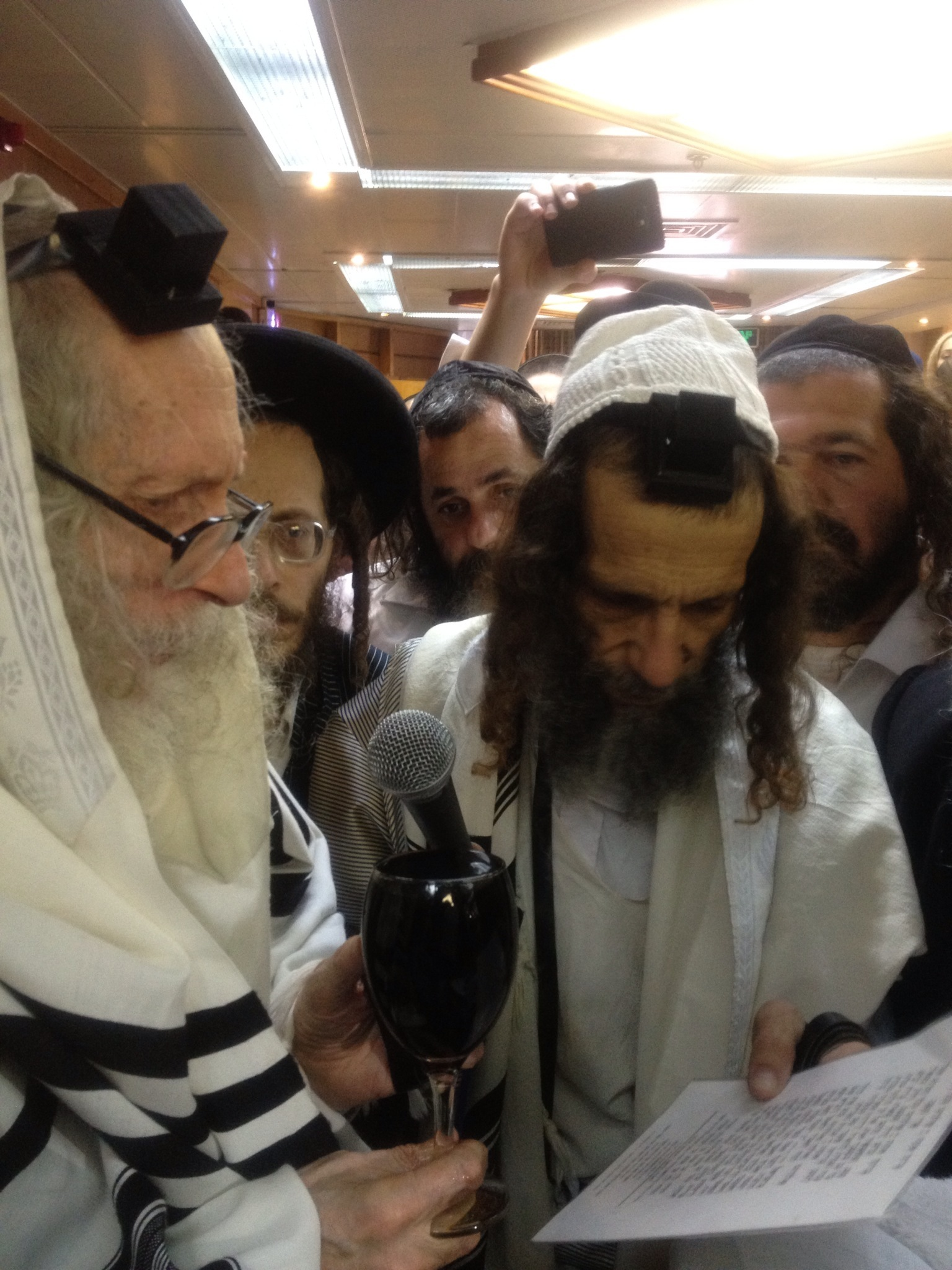
Eliezer Berland and Ofer Erez

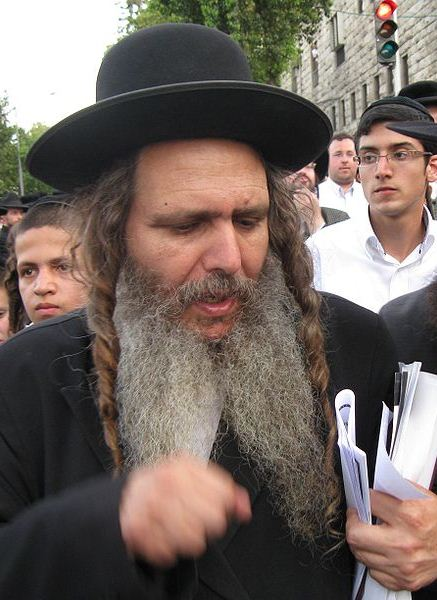
Shalom Arush, leader of a group of Sephardic followers of Breslov Hasidut in Israel

The first large-scale Breslov outreach activities were conducted by Levi Yitzchok Bender, who attracted thousands of baal teshuva followers to the Breslov movement in the 1970s and 1980s.

Concurrently, Eliezer Shlomo Schick began publishing his nearly 1,000 pamphlets distilling the teachings of Nachman of Breslov, and disseminating them to a worldwide audience. Schick founded the Heichal HaKodesh Breslov community – largely consisting of baalei teshuvah – in the Galilee town of Yavne'el, Israel, in 1985. As of 2015, that community had nearly 400 families, representing 30 percent of the town's population.

Eliezer Berland, rosh yeshiva of Yeshivas Shuvu Bonim in the Muslim Quarter of the Old City of Jerusalem, has also brought thousands of Jews from secular backgrounds closer to Orthodox Judaism and Breslov. One of Berland's students, Shalom Arush, went on to found the Chut Shel Chessed Institutions in Jerusalem. Arush leads a group including Sephardic followers of Breslov Hasidut, who mainly originated in the baal teshuva movement.

Zvi Aryeh Rosenfeld introduced Breslov Hasidism to the United States from the 1960s. He also arranged for the first English translation of two key Breslov texts, Shivchei HaRan and Sichot HaRan. Heichal haKodesh, the Breslov yeshiva in Williamsburg, was founded there by Eliezer Shlomo Schick. In 1979, one year after Rosenfeld's death, his son-in-law, Chaim Kramer, established the Breslov Research Institute to continue the effort to publish Breslov teachings in English.

Other Breslov rabbis engaged in outreach include Israël Isaac Besançon, rabbi of the Shir Chadash community in Tel Aviv, and Shalom Sabag. The Na Nach group, which follows the teachings of Yisroel Ber Odesser, conducts on-the-street outreach with its roving musical vans and dancers, and sidewalk distribution of Breslov texts.

== Notable people ==
- Nachman of Breslov
- Nathan of Breslov
- Yisroel Ber Odesser
- Eliezer Berland
- Shalom Arush
- Yaakov Meir Shechter
- Levi Yitzchok Bender
- Eliezer Shlomo Schick
- Zvi Aryeh Rosenfeld
- Abraham Chazan
- Eliyahu Chaim Rosen
- Nachman Chazan
- Alter Tepliker

== See also ==
- History of the Jews in Ukraine
- List of Hasidic dynasties
- Breslov Research Institute
- Hasidic philosophy
- Elazar Mordechai Koenig
- Adi Ran
- Happiness in Judaism
- Avraham Haim Zagdun

== Sources ==
- Greenbaum, Avraham (1987). Tzaddik. Jerusalem/New York: Breslov Research Institute. ISBN 0-930213-17-3.
- Kramer, Chaim (1989). Crossing the Narrow Bridge. Appendix B: Breslov Books. Jerusalem/New York: Breslov Research Institute. ISBN 0-930213-40-8.
