= Nathan of Breslov =

Ukrainian rabbi (1780–1844)

Rabbi Nathan (Noson) Sternhartz
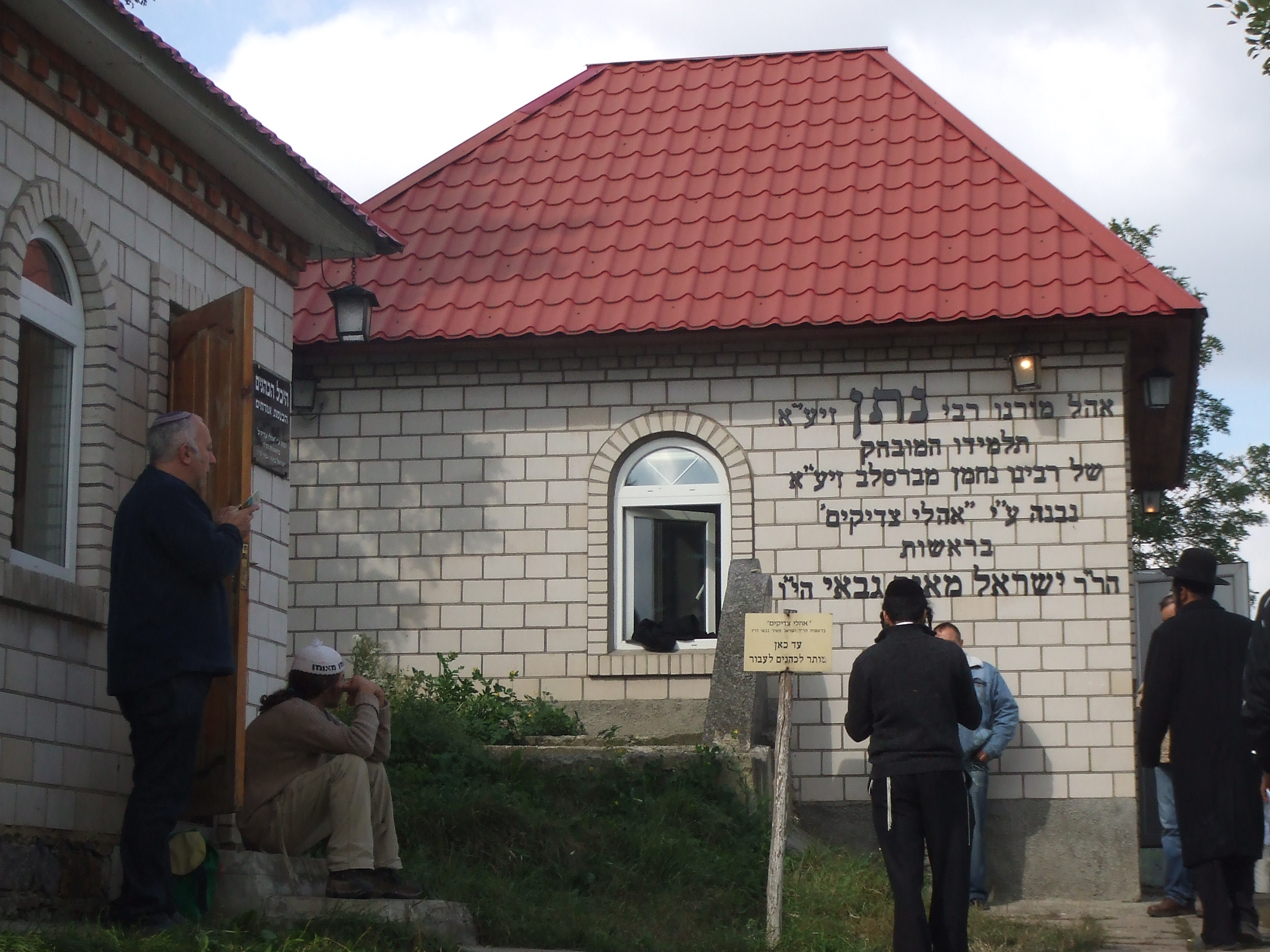
- Ohel over the grave of Nathan of Breslov

Personal life
- Born: 22 January 1780 (15 Shevat 5540 Nemyriv, Polish-Lithuanian Commonwealth (present-day Ukraine)
- Died: 20 December 1844 (10 Tevet 5605 Breslov, Russian Empire (present-day Ukraine)
- Buried: Breslov, Ukraine
- Spouse: Esther Shaindel Ohrbach; Dishel
- Children: with Esther: Shachneh; Yitzchok; Dovid Zvi; Chana Tzirel; with Dishel: Nachman; Yosef Yonah
- Parent(s): Rabbi Naphtali Hertz and Chaya Laneh Sternhartz

Religious life
- Religion: Judaism

Nathan of Breslov (January 22, 1780 – December 20, 1844), also known as Reb Noson, born Nathan Sternhartz, was the chief disciple and scribe of Rebbe Nachman of Breslov, founder of the Breslov Hasidic dynasty. Reb Noson is credited with preserving, promoting and expanding the Breslov movement after the Rebbe's death. Rebbe Nachman himself said, "Were it not for Reb Noson, not a page of my writings would have remained."

== Spiritual seeker ==
Reb Noson was born in the town of Nemyriv, Ukraine. His father, Rabbi Naphtali Hertz Sternhartz, was a Talmudic scholar of some distinction and a wealthy businessman. His mother's name was Chaya Laneh. Reb Noson was the firstborn of his family; he had three brothers — Reb Yudel, Reb Yosef, and Reb Leibush — and one sister, whose name is not known.

Reb Noson received a traditional Torah education and learned his father's business. At the age of 13 (as was the custom), he married Esther Shaindel, daughter of Rabbi Dovid Zvi Orbach, the leading rabbinical authority in Mohilov, Sharograd, and Kremenetz. Both his father and his father-in-law were staunch opponents of Hasidism.

Although Reb Noson was a learned scholar, he felt that something was lacking in his spiritual devotions. He began to visit different Hasidic rebbes, including Levi Yitzchok of Berditchev, and was impressed by their followers' sincerity. However, he could not summon the same intensity in his religious devotions. In 1802, Rebbe Nachman moved to Breslov, Ukraine, which is located nine miles south of Nemyriv (a three-hour journey by horse in those days). Reb Noson went to hear the Rebbe, who was only 8 years his senior, and found the spiritual advisor he was seeking. Reb Noson became Rebbe Nachman's lifelong disciple.

Although Reb Noson's family was initially opposed to his association with Hasidism, they eventually relented when they saw that his Torah scholarship and personal piety only improved under the tutelage of Rebbe Nachman.

Reb Noson and Esther Shaindel had three sons — Shachneh, Yitzchok, and Dovid Zvi — and one daughter, Chana Tzirel. Esther Shaindel died in September 1826, and Reb Noson married Dishel, a widow with a son and daughter of her own, in October 1826. With his second wife, he had two more sons, Nachman and Yosef Yonah.

== The scribe ==
Reb Noson was personally responsible for preserving the teachings, stories and everyday conversations of his mentor, and for promulgating the Breslov movement after Nachman's death in 1810.

While the Rebbe was alive, Reb Noson was his official scribe, carefully recording his teacher's words. Because many of the Rebbe's lessons were delivered on Sabbaths and Jewish holidays, when it is forbidden to write (according to Halakha, "Jewish law"), the material had to be written down later. However, Reb Noson had a phenomenal memory and was able to recall many lessons almost word-for-word. He would then show the manuscript to the Rebbe, who would make any final corrections. Some lessons were dictated line by line by Rebbe Nachman to Reb Noson after the Sabbath or Jewish holiday in Yiddish, and Reb Noson would translate the lessons into Hebrew. In his later publications, Reb Noson carefully notes whether a lesson was edited and approved by Nachman himself, or was a less formal anecdote not specifically approved by him. He also makes a clear distinction between the Rebbe's actual words and any comments he himself wrote.

== Building a movement ==
After Rebbe Nachman's death on October 16, 1810, Reb Noson moved to Breslov and began to be known as Nathan of Breslov. He became the leader of the Breslover Hasidim—but not the Rebbe, because Rebbe Nachman did not appoint a successor or establish a dynasty.

Instead, Reb Noson threw all his energies into strengthening the Breslover movement while maintaining his own rigorous schedule of Torah study. He purchased a printing press and published all of Rebbe Nachman's writings, as well as all the remembered conversations he and others had had with Nachman. Reb Noson also wrote many original discourses and teachings, some of which were published during his lifetime. He corresponded with Breslover Hasidim throughout Ukraine, and visited them several times a year.

Reb Noson was also responsible for making Uman, Ukraine, the city in which Rebbe Nachman is buried, into a focal point of the Hasidut. In 1811, he organized the first annual Rosh Hashana kibbutz (prayer gathering) at the gravesite, and continued to lead this pilgrimage until his death in 1844. Around 1830, he raised funds to build a synagogue in Uman to accommodate the increasingly large Rosh Hashana pilgrimage, and composed a number of prayers to be recited at Nachman's grave by his followers.

== Persecution ==
Even during Rebbe Nachman's lifetime, some Hasidic groups opposed the novel approach being taken by the Rebbe to disseminate Hasidism. After Rebbe Nachman's death, this opposition was directed at Reb Noson, who refused to assume the mantle of leadership and continued to promulgate the teachings of the deceased rebbe as if he were still alive. In late 1834, after the Breslover synagogue opened in Uman, Rabbi Moshe Zvi of Savran (the Savraner Rebbe) instigated a smear campaign against Reb Noson and the Breslover Hasidim. Opponents denounced Reb Noson to the Russian authorities, claiming that he was a false prophet whose activities opposed the interests of the Czar. Reb Noson was arrested, charged with treason, exiled to Nemirov (his hometown), and placed under house arrest.

A week before Rosh Hashana, Reb Noson obtained a travel permit and journeyed to Uman in secret. He was discovered, however, reported to the authorities, and arrested on the night before Rosh HaShanah. Assimilated Jews who lived in Uman and who had been friendly with Rebbe Nachman intervened on Reb Noson's behalf and allowed him to remain in Uman for the holiday.

The sudden death of the Savraner Rebbe in 1838 cooled his followers' anti-Breslov ardor. Reb Noson was finally able to return to the city of Breslov later that year.

Reb Noson died shortly before the onset of the Sabbath on Friday, December 20, 1844. According to an oral tradition, that Sabbath morning his childhood friend Reb Naphtali, who was living in Uman at the time, told his companions that he was sure Reb Noson had died the evening before. When asked how he could be so sure, he explained, "I had a dream in which I saw Reb Noson running quickly. I said, 'Reb Noson! Where are you running?' 'Me?' he said. 'Straight to the Rebbe!'"

Reb Noson is buried in Breslov in the old Jewish cemetery overlooking the Bug River.

== Publications ==
=== Rebbe Nachman's teachings ===
Reb Noson arranged and published Rebbe Nachman's works as follows:

- Likutey Moharan (Collected Teachings of Rebbe Nachman), (vol. i., Ostrog, 1808; vol. ii., Moghilev, 1811; vol. iii., Ostrog, 1815)—Hasidic interpretations of the Hebrew Bible, the Midrashim, etc.;
- Sefer HaMiddot (The Aleph-Bet Book) (Moghilev, 1821)—Treatises on morals, arranged alphabetically as a primer.
- Tikkun HaKlali (General Remedy)—Rebbe Nachman's order of ten Psalms to be recited for various problems, plus commentary by Reb Noson. Published as a separate book in 1821.
- Sippurey Ma'asiyyot (Rabbi Nachman's Stories) (n.p., 1815)—parables in Hebrew and Yiddish. The best-known of these tales is The Seven Beggars, which contains many kabbalistic themes and hidden allusions.

=== His own works ===
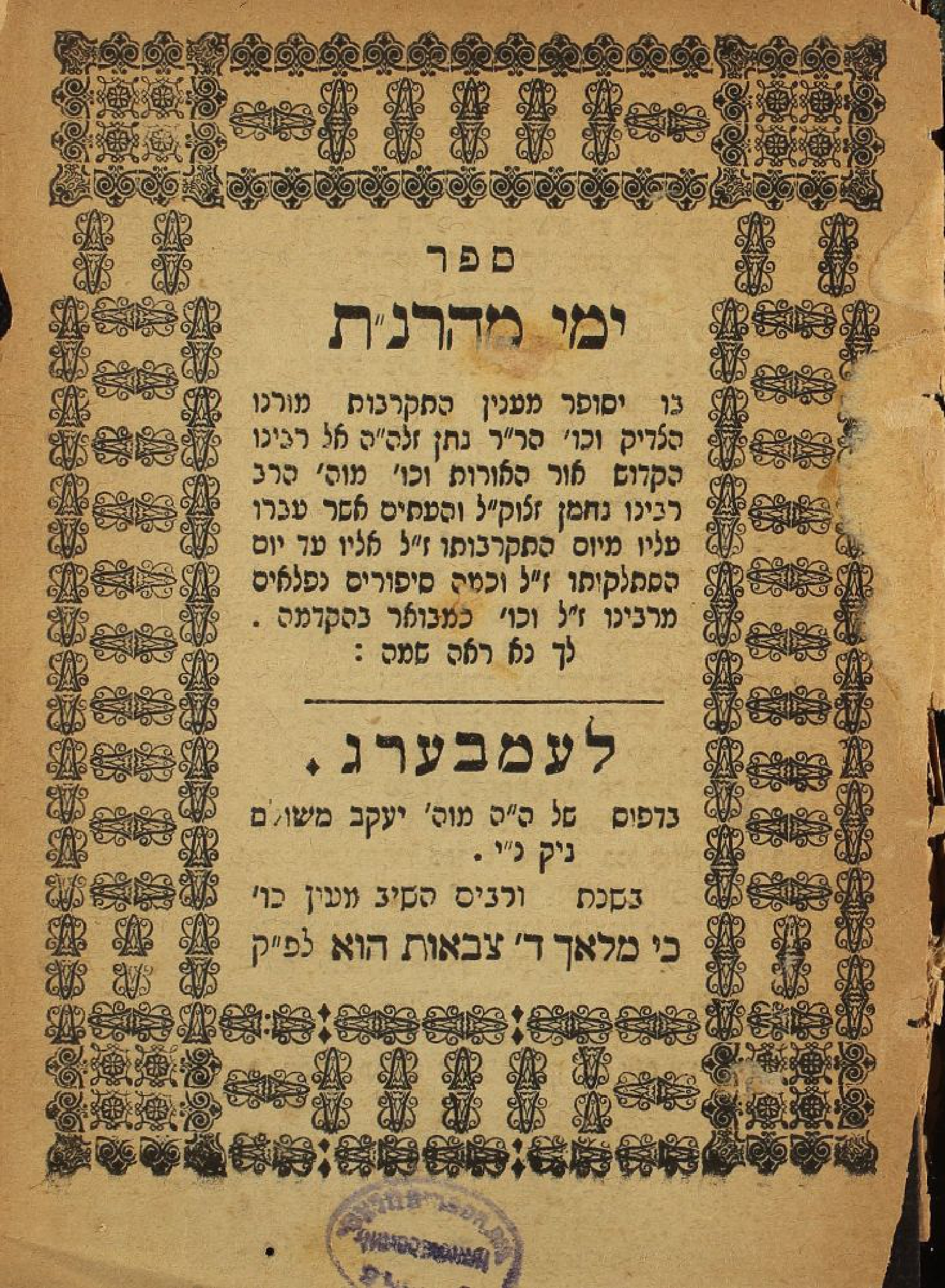
first page of "Yemei moharanat", Editio princeps

In addition, Reb Noson wrote several books of his own:

- Alim L'Terufah (Leaves of Healing) — Collected letters.
- Chayey Moharan (Tzaddik) — Biographical material on Rebbe Nachman. Accounts of how the Rebbe's lessons were revealed, his dreams and visions, conversations and anecdotes.
- Kitzur Likutey Moharan (Abridged Likutey Moharan) — This work follows the original lesson outline of Likutey Moharan while focusing on the practical advice contained in each lesson. Reb Noson began this compilation at Rebbe Nachman's specific request in 1805, and published it for the first time in 1811, after the Rebbe's death. An edited and expanded version with explanatory notes was published in 1913 by Rabbi Yisroel Halpern; this has become the standard version.
- Likutey Etzot (Advice) — An alphabetically organized list of practical advice gleaned from the lessons of Likutey Moharan.
- Likutey Halakhot (Collected Laws) — Reb Noson's magnum opus, following the order of topics in the Shulchan Aruch, gives explanations of Jewish law and practices in the light of Breslov teachings.
- Likutey Tefillot (Collected Prayers) — A collection of original prayers based on the lessons in Rebbe Nachman's Likutey Moharan.
- Shemot Hatzaddikim (Names of Tzaddikim) — A list of most of the tzaddikim found in the Tanakh, Talmud, Midrash and Zohar, including the Geonim, Rishonim and Acharonim up until Reb Noson's day.
- Shevachey V'Sichot HaRan (Rabbi Nachman's Wisdom) — Account of the Rebbe's pilgrimage to the Holy Land in 1798–1799, plus a collection of anecdotes and teachings.
- Yemey Moharnat (The Days of MoHaRNat [an acronym for Moreinu HaRav Natan, Our Teacher, Rabbi Nathan]) — Reb Noson's autobiography.

== See also ==
- Breslov (Hasidic dynasty)
- Rosh Hashana kibbutz (Breslov)
- Nachman of Breslov
- Nachman Chazan
- Abraham Sternhartz
