= Nachman of Breslov =

Hasidic rabbi (1772–1810)

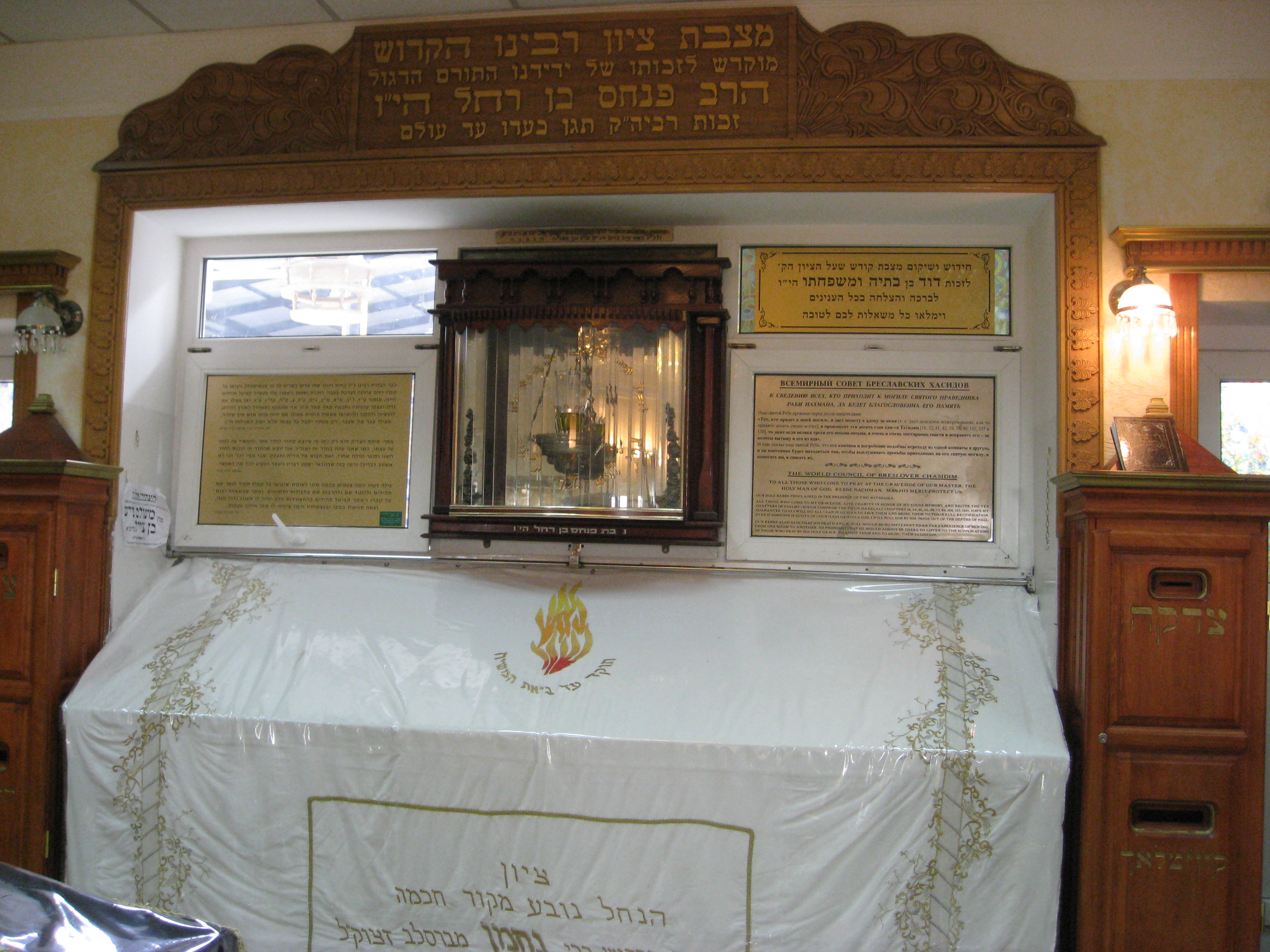
- Title: Breslover Rebbe

Personal life
- Born: Nachman of Breslov; 4 April 1772 (Rosh Chodesh Nisan 5532) Międzybóż, Kingdom of Poland
- Died: 16 October 1810 (18 Tishrei 5571) Uman, Kiev Governorate, Russian Empire
- Buried: Uman, Ukraine; 17 October 1810 (19 Tishrei 5571)
- Spouse: Sashia, daughter of Rabbi Ephraim of Ossatin
- Children: Adil; Sarah; Feiga; Chaya; Miriam daughter (died in infancy); Yaakov; Shlomo Ephraim
- Parents: Simcha (father); Feige (mother)
- Dynasty: Breslov

Religious life
- Religion: Judaism

Jewish leader
- Main work: Likutey Moharan
- Dynasty: Breslov

Nachman of Breslov (Hebrew: רַבִּי נַחְמָן מִבְּרֶסְלֶב Rabbī Naḥmān mīBreslev), also known as Rabbi Nachman of Breslev, Rabbi Nachman miBreslev, Reb Nachman of Bratslav, Reb Nachman Breslover (Yiddish: רבי נחמן ברעסלאווער Rebe Nakhmen Breslover), and Nachman from Uman (April 4, 1772 – October 16, 1810), was the founder of the Breslov Hasidic movement. He was particularly known for his creative parables, drawing on Eastern European folktales to infuse his teaching with deeply kabbalistic yet universally accessible remedies, pieces of advice, and parabolic stories. He emphasized finding and expressing one’s uniqueness while steering away from despair in a world he saw as becoming more and more uniform. Through Martin Buber's translation, his teaching is thought to have influenced some 20th-century writers, including Franz Kafka.

Rabbi Nachman, a great-grandson of the Baal Shem Tov, revived the Hasidic movement by combining the Kabbalah with in-depth Torah scholarship. He attracted thousands of followers during his lifetime, and his influence continues today in Breslover Hasidism and non-Hasidic movements. Rabbi Nachman's religious philosophy revolved around closeness to God, speaking to God in normal conversation "as you would with a best friend", and being happy. The concept of hitbodedut was central to his thinking.

Rabbi Nahman was born the 1st of Nisan and his day of passing (Yortzeit/Hilula) is on the 18th of Tishrei.

== Biography ==
Nachman was born on April 4, 1772 (Rosh Chodesh Nisan), into a family of central figures in Hasidism in the town then known as Międzybóż in the Polish–Lithuanian Commonwealth, now Medzhybizh, Ukraine. Initially, he declined to take on his family's tradition of leading Hasidism.

Nachman's mother, Feiga, was the daughter of Adil (also spelled Udel), daughter of the Baal Shem Tov. His father Simcha was the son of a Baal Shem Tov's disciple for whom Nachman was named: Nachman of Horodenka (Gorodenka), who was a seventh-generation lineal descendant of Judah Loew ben Bezalel. Nachman had two brothers, Yechiel Zvi and Yisroel Mes, and a sister, Perel.

At 13, he married Sashia, daughter of Rabbi Ephraim, and moved to his father-in-law's home in Ossatin. He acquired his first disciple on his wedding day—a young man named Shimon, who was several years older than him.

During 1798–1799, he traveled from Ukraine to the land of Israel, where he visited Hasidim living in Haifa, Tiberias, and Safed. He arrived in Galilee right before Napoleon’s battle with the Turks. This journey, which he saw as a private rite of passage, was often looked back on as a source of inspiration for him. In Tiberias, his influence brought about a reconciliation between the Lithuanian and Volhynian Hasidim. On his return from Israel, he was ready to assume the mantle of leadership in Hasidism, which he did in a highly selective manner. In his early years of leadership, he made each disciple confess all of his sins to him, as well as participate in a daily hour-long conversation with God.

Shortly before Rosh Hashana 1800, Nachman moved to the town of Zlatopol.

=== Moves to Bratslav and Uman ===
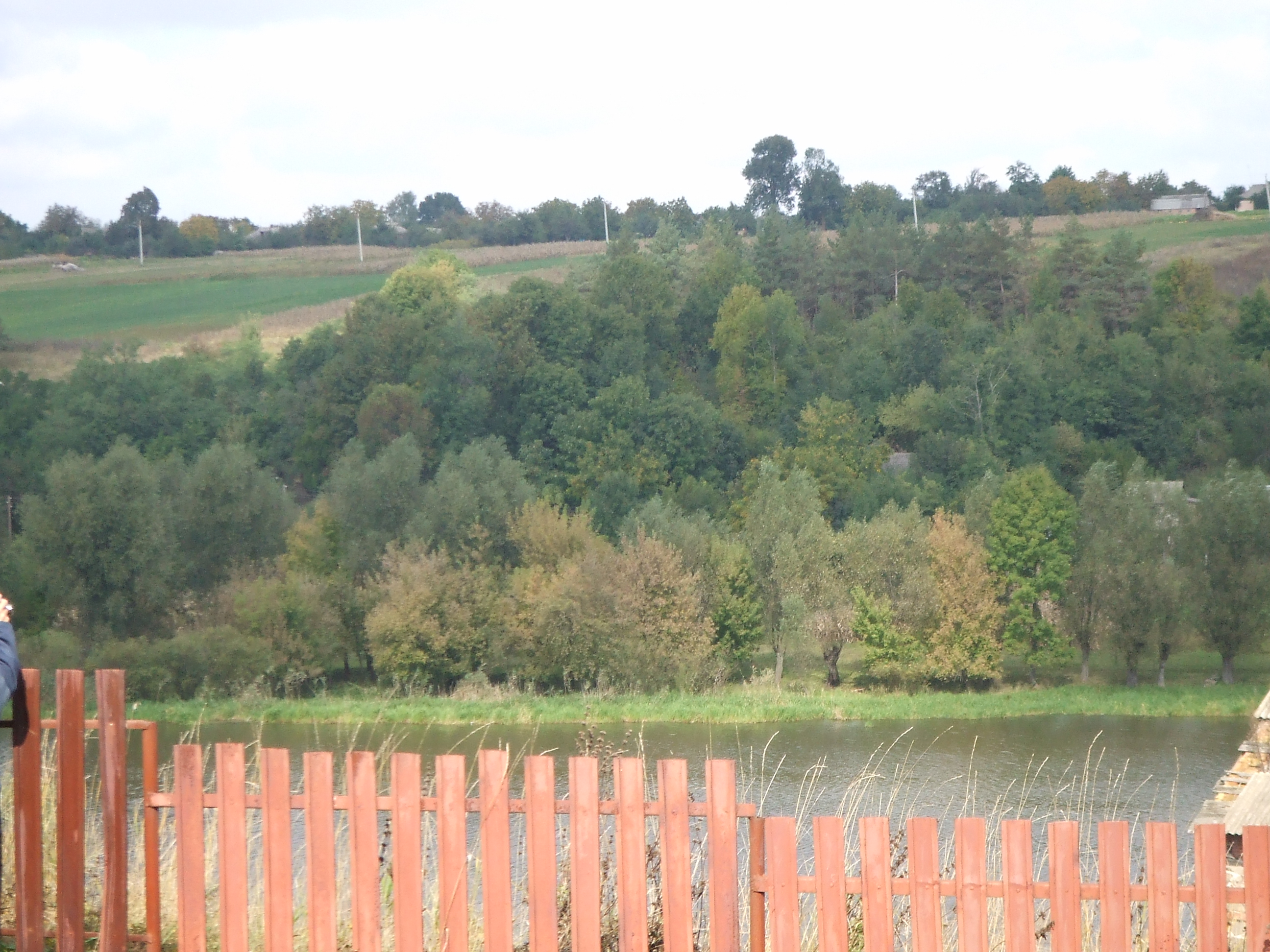
River in Bratslav

In 1802, Nachman moved to the town of Bratslav, also known as "Breslov" and "Bracław".

His move to the town of Breslov brought him into contact with Nathan Sternhartz, a 22-year-old Torah scholar in the nearby town of Nemirov. Sternhartz recorded all of Nachman's formal lessons as well as transcribing his work Likutey Moharan. After Nachman's death, Sternhartz recorded informal conversations he and other disciples had had with Nachman, whose works he published with his own commentaries on them.

Nachman and his wife Sashia had six daughters and two sons. Two daughters died in infancy, and the two sons both died within a year and a half of their births. Around the birth of his first son, Shlomo Efraim, in 1805, a messianic awakening occurred in the circle surrounding Nachman. He began to speak of the coming of the Messiah, who would embody both the Messiah son of David and the Messiah son of Joseph in a single figure (possibly alluding to his son, whose name includes both son of David and son of Joseph). In 1806, Shlomo Efraim died, an event that caused a major crisis among the Breslov Hasidim and led to a decline in messianic expectations. Their surviving children were Adil, Sarah, Miriam, and Chayah. Sashia died of tuberculosis in June 1807, and the following month, Nachman became engaged to a woman named Trachtenberg. Right after the engagement, Nachman contracted tuberculosis.

In 1810, after a fire destroyed Nachman's home, a group of maskilim (Jews belonging to the Jewish enlightenment movement) living in Uman invited him to live in their town and provided housing for him as his illness worsened. However, this was not the sole impetus for his relocation to Uman. In 1768, the Massacre of Uman took place, resulting in the brutal deaths of thousands of Jews, who were subsequently interred in a mass grave. Rabbi Nachman chose to move to this site with the intention of aiding in the spiritual redemption of the departed souls. As Arthur Green wrote: "Nachman [...] decided upon Uman as a home in order to work with the poor souls of those martyred Jews—and in order to be buried among them when his own time came to die".

Nachman died of tuberculosis at the age of 38 in the early autumn on the fourth day of Sukkot 1810 and was buried in the local Jewish cemetery.

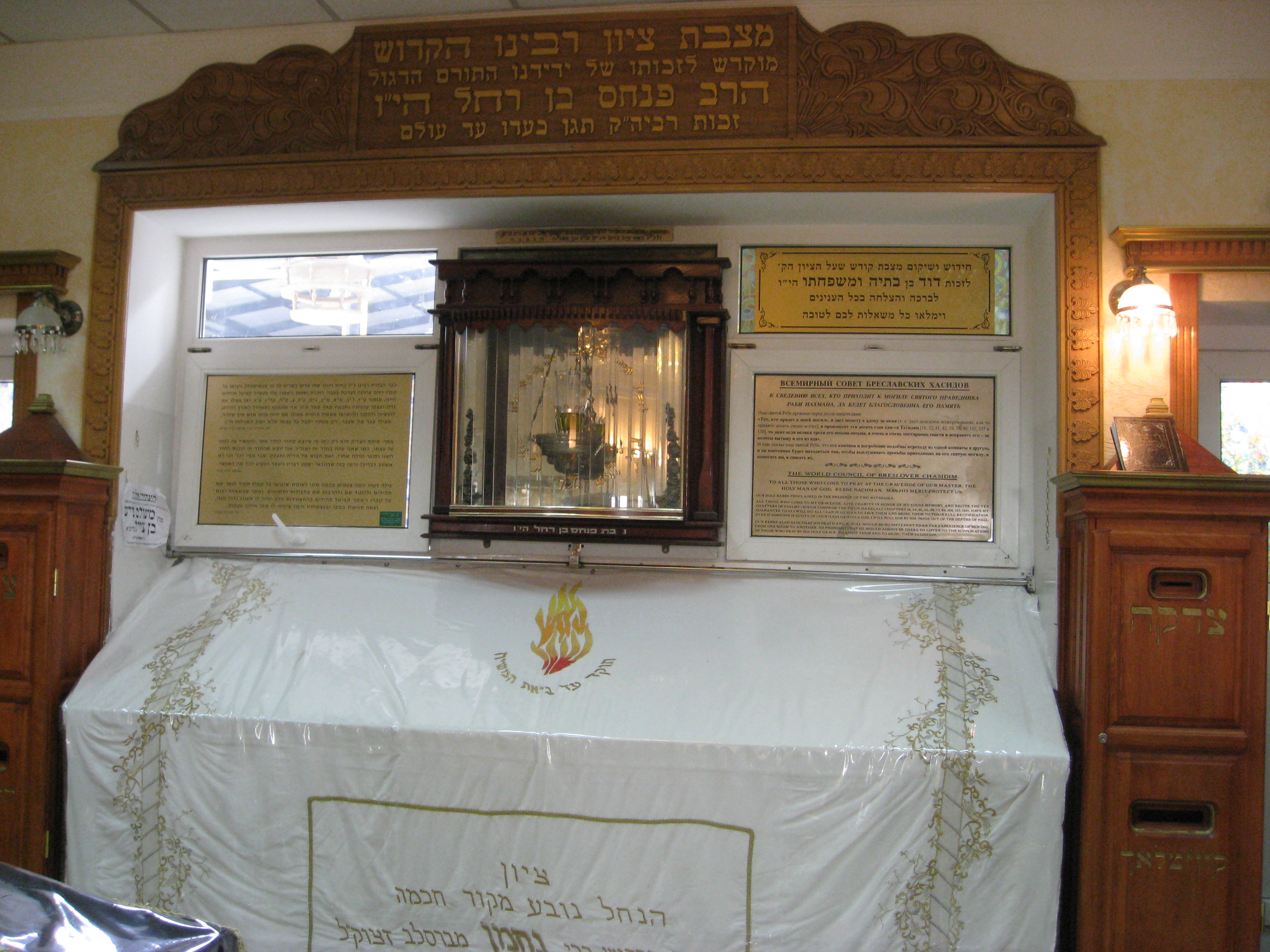
Grave of Rebbe Nachman of Breslov

Based on the frequent fluctuations and changes in Nachman's mood, scholars have suggested that he suffered from severe depression and from bipolar disorder, which has traditionally been understood within Breslov as a fight for more purity and holiness. Rabbi Nachman goes constantly higher and higher spiritually with ups-and-downs, and every single down is a new start to get higher compared to the precedent stage, and a difficult step to deal with before a new ascension.

== Pilgrimage tradition ==
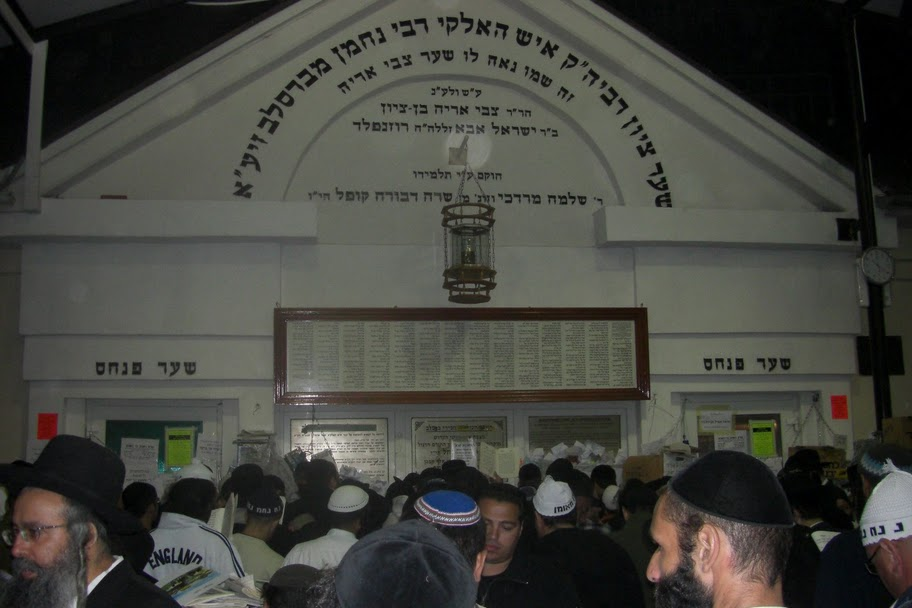
The synagogue where Nachman is buried

After Nachman's death Sternhartz instituted an annual pilgrimage to his gravesite on Rosh Hashana, called the Rosh Hashana kibbutz, which drew thousands of Hasidim until 1917, when the October Revolution forced it to continue clandestinely. Only a dozen or so Hasidim risked making the annual pilgrimage during the Communist era. During Perestroika in the Soviet Union in 1989, the gates were reopened. In 2008, approximately 25,000 people from all over the world participated in this annual pilgrimage.

== Teachings ==
Nachman rejected the idea of hereditary Hasidic dynasties and taught that each Hasid must "search for the tzaddik ('saintly/righteous person')". He believed that every Jew had the potential to become a tzaddik. He emphasized that a tzaddik should magnify God’s blessings on the community through their performance of mitzvot. However, a tzaddik cannot absolve a Hasid of their sins; the Hasid should pray only to God, not to the Rebbe of the time. Confiding in others unburdens the soul as part of repentance and healing.

In his early life, he stressed the practice of fasting and self-castigation as the most effective means of repentance. In later years, however, he abandoned severe asceticism because he felt it might lead to depression and sadness. He told his followers not to be "fanatics". Instead, they should choose one personal mitzvah to be very strict about and do the others with a healthy amount of care.

He encouraged his disciples to take every opportunity to increase holiness in themselves and their daily activities. For example, by marrying and living with one's spouse according to Torah law, one elevates sexual intimacy to an act bespeaking honor and respect to the God-given powers of procreation. He urged everyone to seek out their own and others' good points in order to approach life in a state of continual happiness. He stressed living with faith, simplicity, and joy. He encouraged his followers to clap, sing, and dance during or after their prayers to bring them closer to God. He taught his followers to spend an hour alone daily, talking aloud to God in their own words, as if "talking to a good friend". This is in addition to the prayers in the siddur. Breslover Hasidism still follows this practice today, which is known as hitbodedut (literally, "to make oneself be in solitude"). Nachman taught that the best place to do hitbodedut was in a field or forest among the natural works of God's creation. He emphasized the importance of music for spiritual development and religious practice.

== Controversy ==
In 1816, Joseph Perl wrote a denunciation of Hasidic mysticism and beliefs, in which he criticized many of the writings of Nachman, who had died six years earlier. Austrian imperial censors blocked publication of Perl's treatise, fearing that it would foment unrest among the empire's Jewish subjects.

During his lifetime Nachman also encountered opposition within the Hasidic movement itself from people who questioned his new approach. Eventually nearly the entire Jewish population of Zlatopil opposed Nachman, leading him to relocate to Breslov in 1802.

== Published works ==
Reb Nachman's Torah lessons and stories were published and disseminated mainly after his death by his disciple, Reb Nathan of Breslov:

- Likutey Moharan ("Collected Teachings of Our Teacher, Rabbi Nachman") (vol. i., Ostrog, 1808; vol. ii., Moghilev, 1811; vol. iii., Ostrog, 1815)—Hasidic interpretations of the Tanakh, Talmud and Midrashim, Zohar, etc. This work has been completely translated to English and annotated in fifteen volumes by Rabbis Chaim Kramer and Moshe Mykoff of the Breslov Research Institute.
- Sefer HaMidot (The Aleph-Bet Book) (Moghilev, 1821)—a collection of practical advice gleaned from Torah sources, presented as epigrams or maxims and arranged alphabetically by topic.
- Tikkun HaKlali ("General Remedy")—Reb Nachman's order of ten Psalms to be recited for various problems, plus commentary by Reb Noson. Published as a separate book in 1821.
- Sippurei Ma'asiyot (Tales of Rabbi Nachman or Rabbi Nachman's Stories) (n.p., 1816)—13 story tales in Yiddish and then translated in to Hebrew and that are filled with deep mystical secrets. The longest of these tales is The Seven Beggars, which contains many kabbalistic themes and hidden allusions. Several fragmentary stories are also included in Rabbi Aryeh Kaplan's translation of the complete tales, Rabbi Nachman's Stories.
- Sichot HaRan ("Talks of Rabbi Nachman"): Compilation of the central teachings of Rabbi Nachman, comprising 308 "sichas", mainly presented as anecdotes, concerning Hassidic philosophy and the Service of God, and providing background and remarks re earlier teachings. Originally an appendix to Sippurei Ma'asiyot.

Another mysterious document that Reb Nachman dictated to Reb Nathan is the Megillat Setarim ("Hidden Scroll"), which was written in a cryptic combination of Hebrew initials and brief phrases. Prof. Zvi Mark has researched and attempted to decipher this document, based on disclosures from prominent members of the Breslov community. His findings have been published in Hebrew and in English translation, along with facsimiles of discrepant manuscript copies.

== Destroyed writings ==
Nachman also wrote but then destroyed Sefer HaGanuz ("The Hidden Book") and the Sefer HaNisraf ("The Burned Book"). He told his disciples that these volumes contained deep mystical insights that few would be able to comprehend. He dictated the Sefer HaNisraf to Sternhartz, who said that he did not understand it at all and that "What I do remember is that it spoke about the greatness of the mitzvah of hospitality and preparing the bed for a guest". Nachman never showed the Sefer HaGanuz to anyone, and in 1808 he burned all the copies of the Sefer HaGanuz and the Sefer Ha-nisraf. He destroyed them in a belief that his tuberculosis was a "punishment from the upper-world--for writing a book".

== Quotes ==
- "It is a great mitzvah to be happy always."
- "If you believe that you can damage, then believe that you can fix."
- "Gevalt!!! Never give up hope! There is no despair."
- "When a person realizes that he is on a very low level and far from God, this itself is a reason to feel encouraged. Before this, he was so far from God that he did not even know it. Now at least he knows it, and this itself is a sign that he is drawing closer."
- "Worldly desires are like sunbeams in a dark room. They seem solid until you try to grasp one."
- "It is very good to pour out your heart to God as you would to a true, good friend."
- "You are never given an obstacle you cannot overcome."
- "The essence of wisdom is to realize how far from wisdom you are."
- "All the sages of Israel are in my estimation like a garlic peel."
- "Wherever I go, I'm always going to Israel."
- "Know that [when] a person needs to cross a very, very narrow bridge, the general principle and main point is not to make oneself at all terrified."
- “I will sing!” (Psalms 146:2) And the way to sing the song of joy is by seeking the good in all people, especially in ourselves. Each good point is one more note in the song of life!"

== See also ==
- Na Nach Nachma Nachman Meuman
- Levi Yitzchok of Berditchev
- The Rooster Prince
- Nathan of Breslov
- Rosh Hashana kibbutz

== Bibliography ==
- Green, Arthur (1992). Tormented Master: The Life and Spiritual Quest of Rabbi Nahman of Bratslav. Jewish Lights Publishing. ISBN 1-879045-11-7
- Greenbaum, Avraham (1987). Tzaddik: A Portrait of Rabbi Nachman. Jerusalem: Breslov Research Institute. ISBN 0-930213-17-3
- Kaplan, Aryeh (1973). Rabbi Nachman's Wisdom. Jerusalem: Breslov Research Institute.
- Kaplan, Aryeh (2005). The Seven Beggars: & Other Kabbalistic Tales of Reb Nachman of Breslov (Nahman, Nachman). Woodstock, VT: Jewish Lights Publications for the Breslov Research Institute. ISBN 1-58023-250-7
- Kaplan, Aryeh (1985). Until the Mashiach: The Life of Rabbi Nachman. Jerusalem: Breslov Research Institute.
- Kramer, Chaim (1989). Crossing the Narrow Bridge. Jerusalem: Breslov Research Institute. ISBN 0-930213-40-8
- Kramer, Chaim (1992). Through Fire and Water: The Life of Reb Noson of Breslov. Jerusalem: Breslov Research Institute. ISBN 0-930213-44-0.
- Levine, Rabbi Menachem Article on Aish: https://aish.com/uman-what-you-need-to-know-about-the-city-of-souls/
- Mark, zvi, (2010). The scroll of secrets: the hidden messianic vision of R. Nachman of Breslav. Academic Studies Press. ISBN 978-1-934843-94-9.
- Mark, zvi, (2015). The Revealed and Hidden Writings of Rabbi Nachman of Bratslav: His Worlds of Revelation and Rectification. De Gruyter Oldenbourg. ISBN 978-3110407716
- Mykoff, Moshe (2003). 7th Heaven. Woodstock: Jewish Lights Publishing, with the Breslov Research Institute. ISBN 1-58023-175-6
- Sears, Dovid (2010). Breslov Pirkey Avot. Jerusalem: Breslov Research Institute. ISBN 978-1-928822-16-5.
- Dynes, Ofer (2024), "How to Read Naḥman of Bratslav's Tales in Their Historical Context." https://muse.jhu.edu/article/951922
