= Machon LeHafotzas Toraso Shel Moshiach =

Chabad publishing organization

- מכון להפצת תורתו של משיח
- Formation: 2010
- Founder: Rabbi Yisroel Granovator
- Founded at: Crown Heights, Brooklyn, NYC
- Headquarters: Crown Heights, Brooklyn, NYC, U.S.
- Affiliations: Chabad messianism
- Website: torasmoshiach.com

Machon LeHafotzas Toraso Shel Moshiach (מכון להפצת תורתו של משיח lit. 'Institute for the Dissemination of the Teachings of Moshiach') is a Chabad publishing institute affiliated with Chabad messianism. The institute's focus is on publishing, editing, and distributing works related to the teachings and messianic interpretations of the seventh Rebbe of Chabad, Menachem Mendel Schneerson.

The organization produces books, pamphlets, and other educational materials that promote the belief that Schneerson is the Jewish messiah. Its publications are circulated primarily within Chabad Meshichist circles.

The institute was founded by Rabbi Yisroel Granovator in 2010 and is headquartered in the Crown Heights neighborhood, near Chabad headquarters, 770 Eastern Parkway.

In 2019 the institute created a website with an online shop for ordering works, as well as a section with many of their publications available to read for free.

== Publications ==
Between 2014 and 2016 the institute published Sefer HaMa’amarim – Lefi Seder HaParshiyot VeHaMo’adim (Hebrew: ספר המאמרים – לפי סדר הפרשיות והמועדים), a multi-volume collection of the Chassidic discourses delivered by the Rebbe from 1951 to 1991. The volumes arrange the discourses according to the weekly Torah portions and Jewish holidays, rather than chronological order.

In 2017 the institute began publishing Divrei Moshiach, a weekly series of edited transcripts of the talks (sichot) and discourses (ma’amarim) of the Rebbe.

== Links ==
Machon LeHafotzas Toraso Shel Moshiach on Chabadpedia
