= Koson (Hasidic dynasty) =

Ukrainian Hasidic dynasty

Koson (Hebrew: קוסון, Yiddish: קאסאן) is a Hasidic dynasty originating in Koson, Zakarpattia Oblast (also Kossyny or Kaszony) in Ukraine. The dynasty was founded by Yehosef Rottenberg in 1897.

== History ==
=== Bnei Shileishim ===
Yehosef Rottenberg was born in Halych in 1853 to Tzvi Hirsh and Chaya Dreizya Rottenberg. He studied under Chaim Halberstam of Sanz and Yekusiel Yehuda Teitelbaum of Siget. Yehosef married Sara Yittel, the daughter of Meshulim Feish Segal-Lowy I of Tosh and authored the sefer Bnei Shileishem (and is therefore sometimes referred to by its name). He settled in Koson in 1897 where he served as rebbe. After his death in 1911, he was succeeded as rebbe in Koson by his son, Chaim Shlomo Rottenberg.

=== Shmuah Tovah ===
Chaim Shlomo Rottenberg married Raitze, daughter of Asher Yashaya Rubin [YI] of Kolbuszowa, Poland, and authored the sefer Shmuah Tovah. In 1920 however, nine years after assuming the position of rebbe, Chaim Shlomo died, and was succeeded by his younger brother (and son-in-law), Yisrael Tzvi Rottenberg, known by the name of his sefer, Ohr Moleh.

=== Ohr Moleh ===
Yisrael Tzvi Rottenberg established a Hasidic yeshiva in Koson, Ateres Tzvi, attracting over a hundred students from throughout the region who studied Torah for a year or more. For the Jewish holidays, many more hasidim came to Koson to be with the rebbe. During World War II in 1944, the entire Jewish community of Koson was taken to the brick factory at 3-Beregszász Ghetto in nearby Berehove. Soon after, they were deported to the Auschwitz concentration camp, where Yisrael Tzvi and all his children, save for one son-in-law, perished there.

== Post World War II ==
A third son of Yehosef Rottenberg, Moshe Shmuel Rottenberg served as a rabbi in Kisvárda before emigrating to Los Angeles, and was recognized as the Kosoner Rebbe. His son, Pinchas Shalom Rottenberg, served as Kosoner Rebbe in New York, as did his son after him, Menachem Yisrael Rottenberg. He was succeeded by five sons: Meir Yehosef in Borough Park, Brooklyn and, later, in Linden, New Jersey; Moshe Shmuel in London; Naftali Tzvi in Flatbush and, later, in Hillcrest, New York; Avraham Baruch in Lakewood Township, New Jersey; and Chaim Yehuda Leib (Chaim Leibish) in Monsey, New York.

=== Chanukah attack ===
The Koson community came under the spotlight in the Monsey Hanukkah stabbing, in the home of Chaim Leibish Rottenberg, the Kosoner Rebbe of Monsey, New York. After the attack, Then-New York Governor Andrew Cuomo said, standing outside Rottenberg's home, "This is an intolerant time in our country. We see anger. We see hatred exploding. It is an American cancer on the body politic."

=== Linden, New Jersey ===
Meir Yehosef Rottenberg, a son of Menachem Yisrael Rottenberg, served as Kosoner Rebbe in Borough Park, Brooklyn before relocating his congregation to Linden, New Jersey. Although the community had started very small, it grew quickly and currently includes families living in nearby Roselle, Cranford, Clark, and Rahway. After the opening of the Kosonner congregation, other Hasidic communities sprouted in Linden as well, including Bobov, Rachmastrivka, Pupa, and Satmar communities.

=== Israel ===
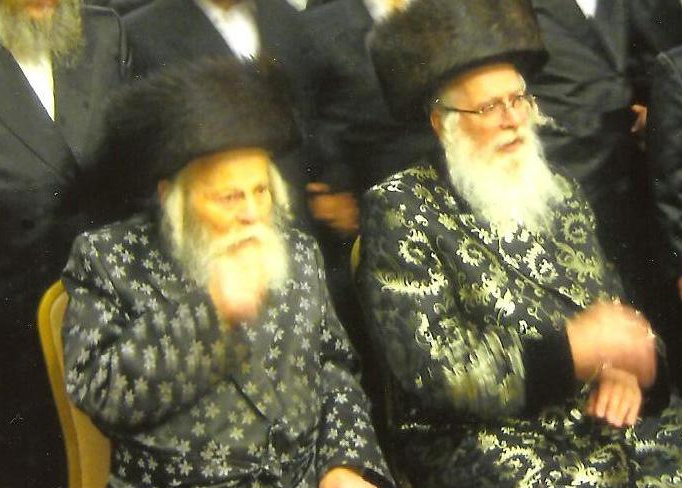
Asher Yeshayahu Rottenberg of Koson (left) with his son-in-law, Eliezer Shlomo Schick of Breslov

The son of Chaim Shlomo Rottenberg, Moshe Shmuel Rottenberg (also the first cousin of Pinchas Shalom Rottenberg, Kosoner Rebbe of New York), served as a rabbi in Debrecen. He later emigrated to New York, where he became recognized as the Kozova Rebbe and in 1961, to Bnei Brak, Israel. His son, Asher Rottenberg, continued the Kosoner dynasty in Bnei Brak (two of his other sons, Rabbis Yechiel Mechel and Chaim Shlomo Rottenberg, succeeded him as Kozova Rebbe).

== Lineage of the Kosonner dynasty ==
The Kozova Rebbes, who descend from Yehosef Rottenberg, are included in the dynasty of the Kosoner Rebbes.

- Yehosef Rottenberg of Koson (1853-1911), Bnei Shileishim, Kosoner Rebbe
  - Chaim Shlomo Rottenberg of Koson (1870-1920), Shmuah Tovah, Kosoner Rebbe
    - Moshe Shmuel Rottenberg II of Debrecen, New York, and Bnei Brak (c. 1895–1975), Kozova Rebbe
      - Asher Yeshayahu Rottenberg of Bnei Brak, Kosoner Rebbe
        - Eliezer Shlomo Schick of Yavne'el and New York (1940-2015), son-in-law of Asher Rottenberg, Breslover rabbi
      - Yechiel Mechel Rottenberg of Crown Heights (d. 2008), New York, Kozova Rebbe
      - Chaim Shlomo Rottenberg of Flatbush, New York (d. 1990), Kozova Rebbe
        - Tuvia Rottenberg of Flatbush, New York, Kozova Rebbe
  - Yisrael Tzvi Rottenberg of Koson (1889-1944), Ohr Moleh, Kosoner Rebbe
    - Chananya Yom Tov Lipa Teitelbaum (1911-1983), son-in-law of the Ohr Moleh, Nirbater Rav
  - Moshe Shmuel Rottenberg I of Kleinvardein and Los Angeles (1874-1946), Kosoner Rebbe
    - Pinchas Shalom Rottenberg of New York (1892-1966), Kosoner Rebbe
      - Meshulam Feish Rottenberg of New York (1931-2014), Kosoner Rebbe
      - Menachem Yisrael Rottenberg of New York (1928-2002), Kosoner Rebbe
        - Meir Yehosef Rottenberg of Linden, Kosoner Rebbe
        - Chaim Yehudah Leibish Rottenberg of Monsey, New York (b. 1958), Koson-Forshay Rebbe
        - Avraham Baruch Rottenberg of Lakewood, Kosoner Rebbe
        - Moshe Shmuel Rottenberg of London, Kosoner Rebbe
        - Naftali Tzvi Rottenberg of Hillcreast, Kosoner Rebbe

Yeshaya Meshilem feish of Rozla ( Eretz Yisrael)
