= Shiur =

Torah lecture

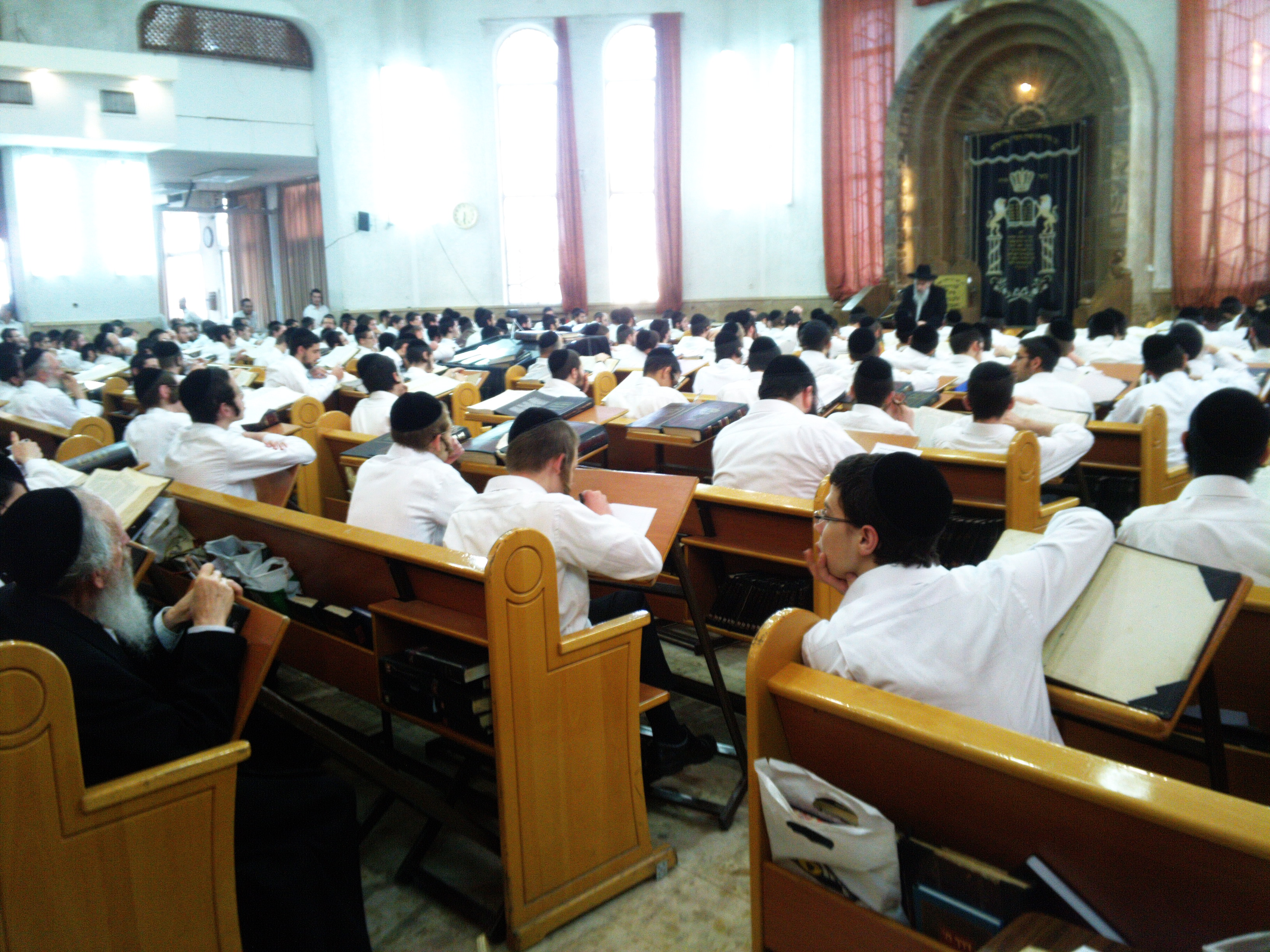
Shiur klali at Slabodka Yeshiva

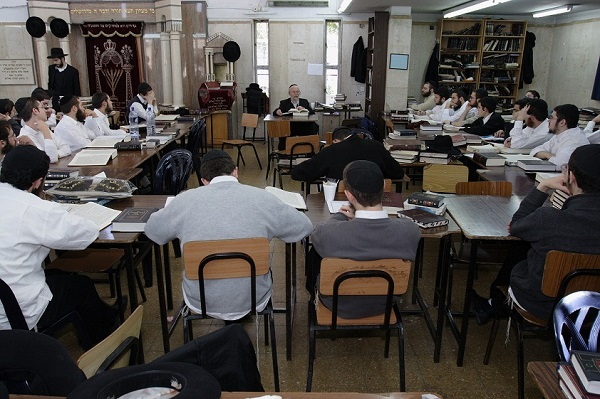
Gemara shiur at Toras Emes Yeshiva

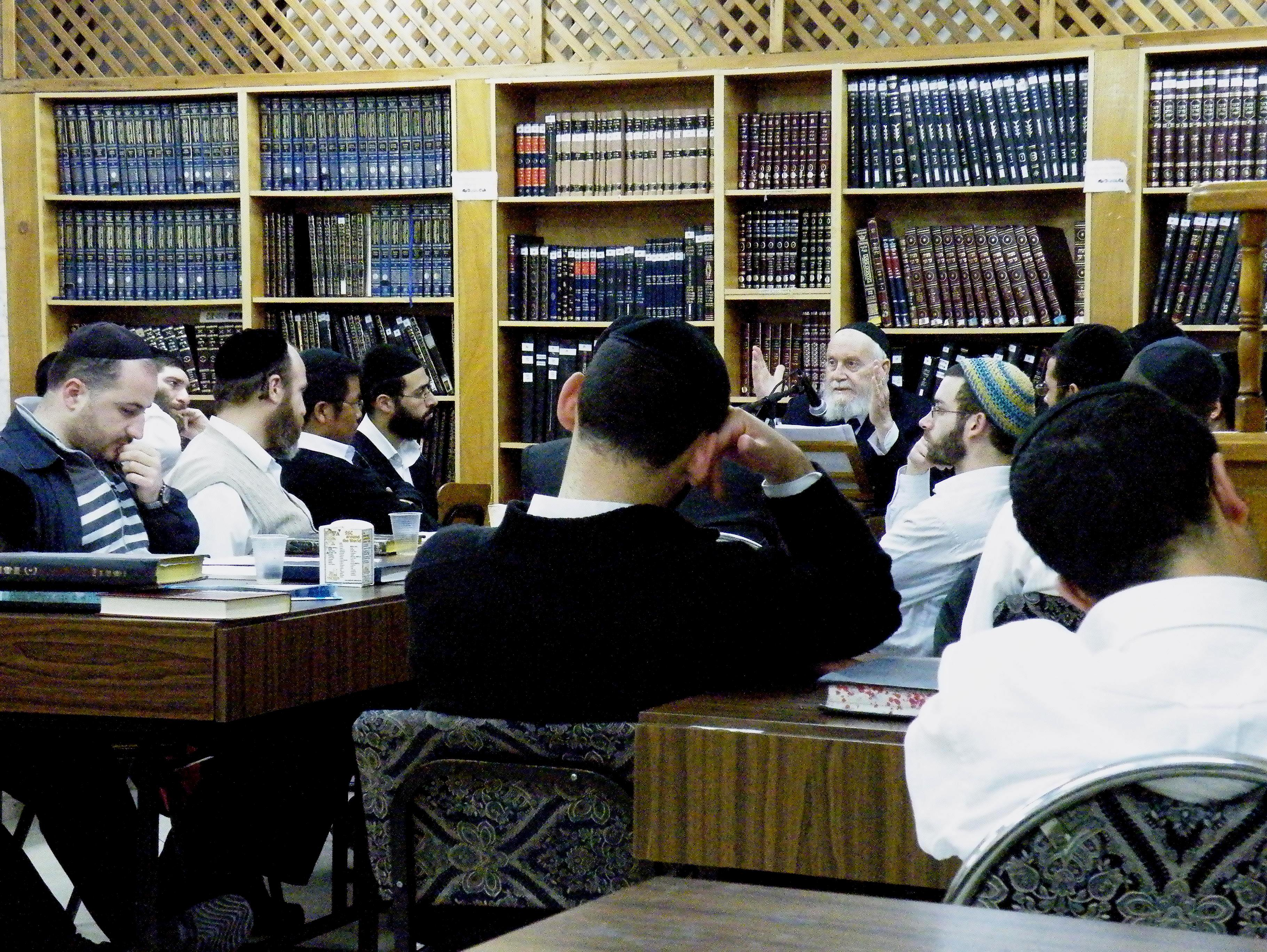
Rabbinical shiur delivered in Jerusalem

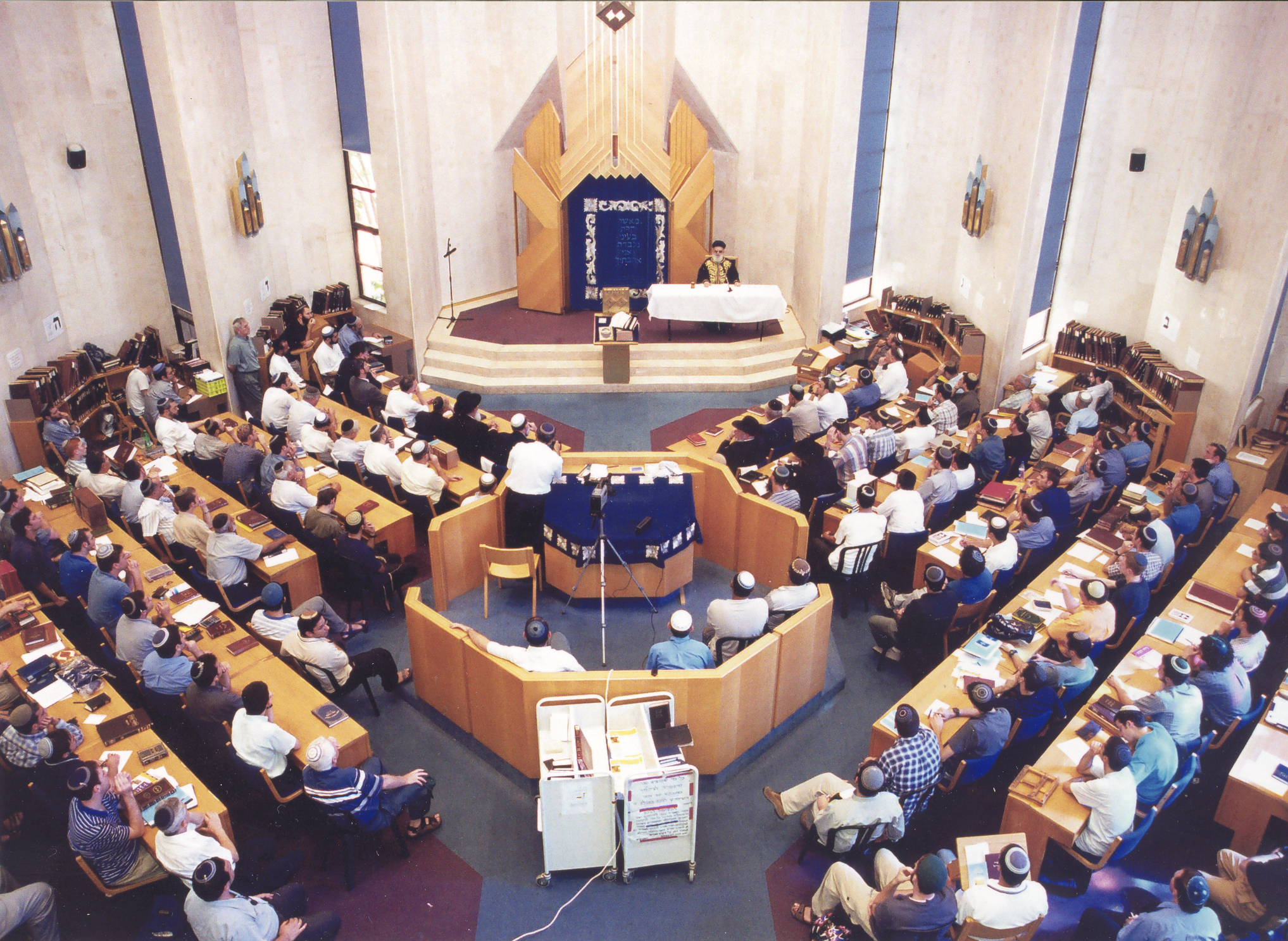
Public shiur by Rabbi Ovadia Yosef at Bar-Ilan University, Machon synagogue

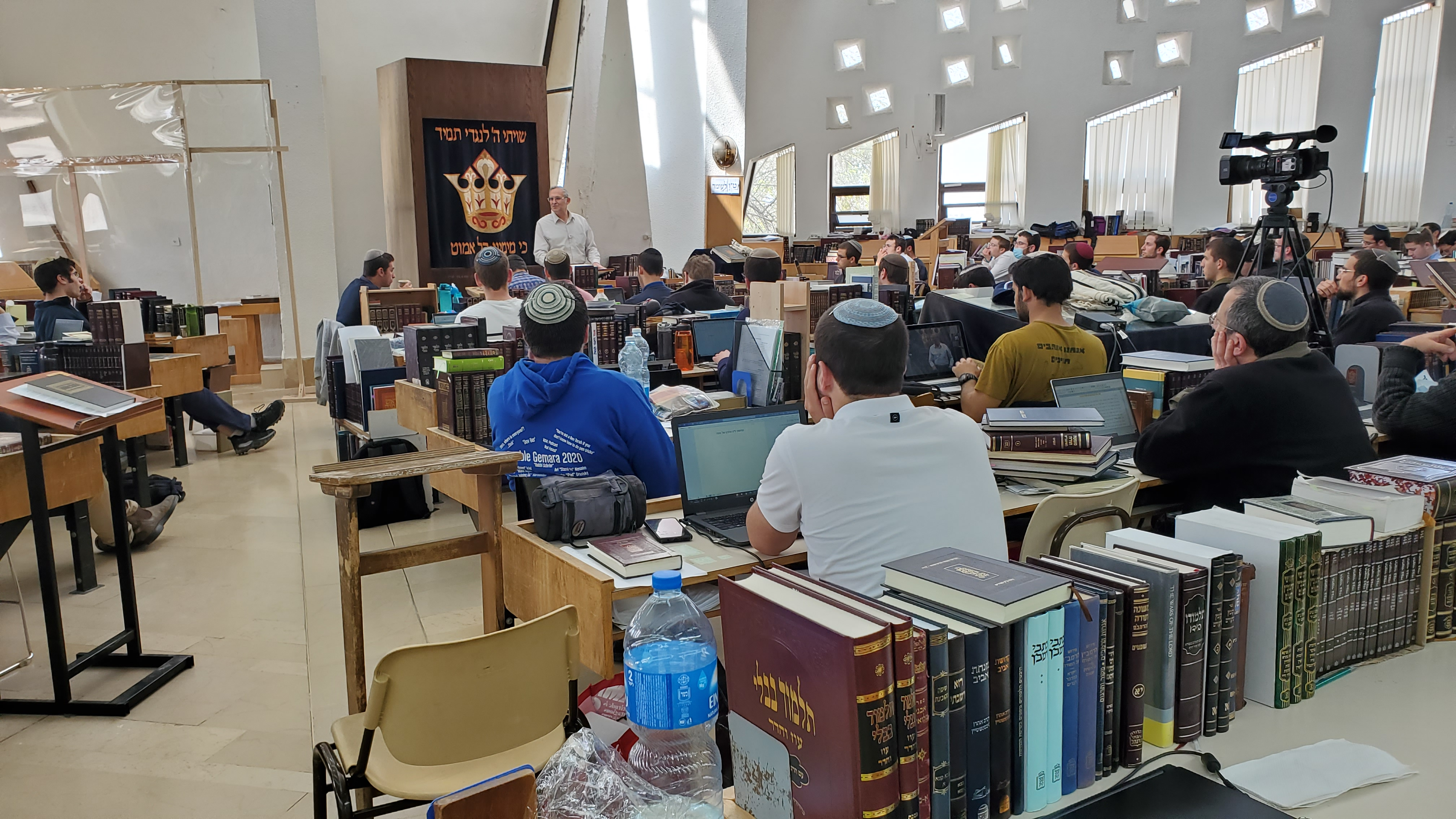
Memorial shiur on the yarzheit of Rav Aharon Lichtenstein at Yeshivat Har Etzion

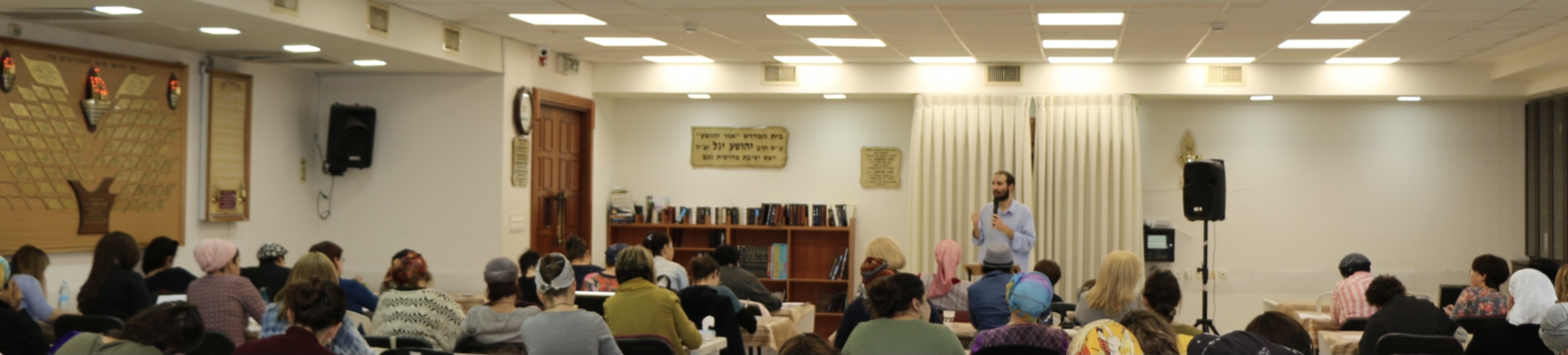
Yom iyun, Midreshet Oryah (click to enlarge)

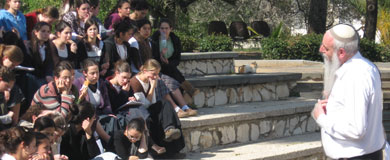
Sicha, Ulpana students

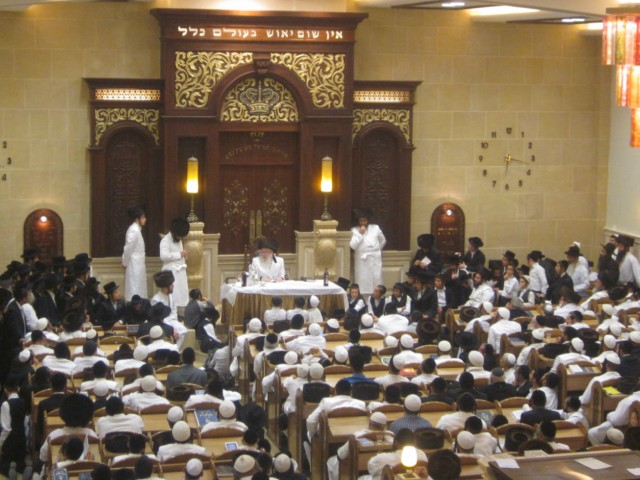
Drosha by Rabbi Eliezer Shlomo Schick, Yavne'el Synagogue

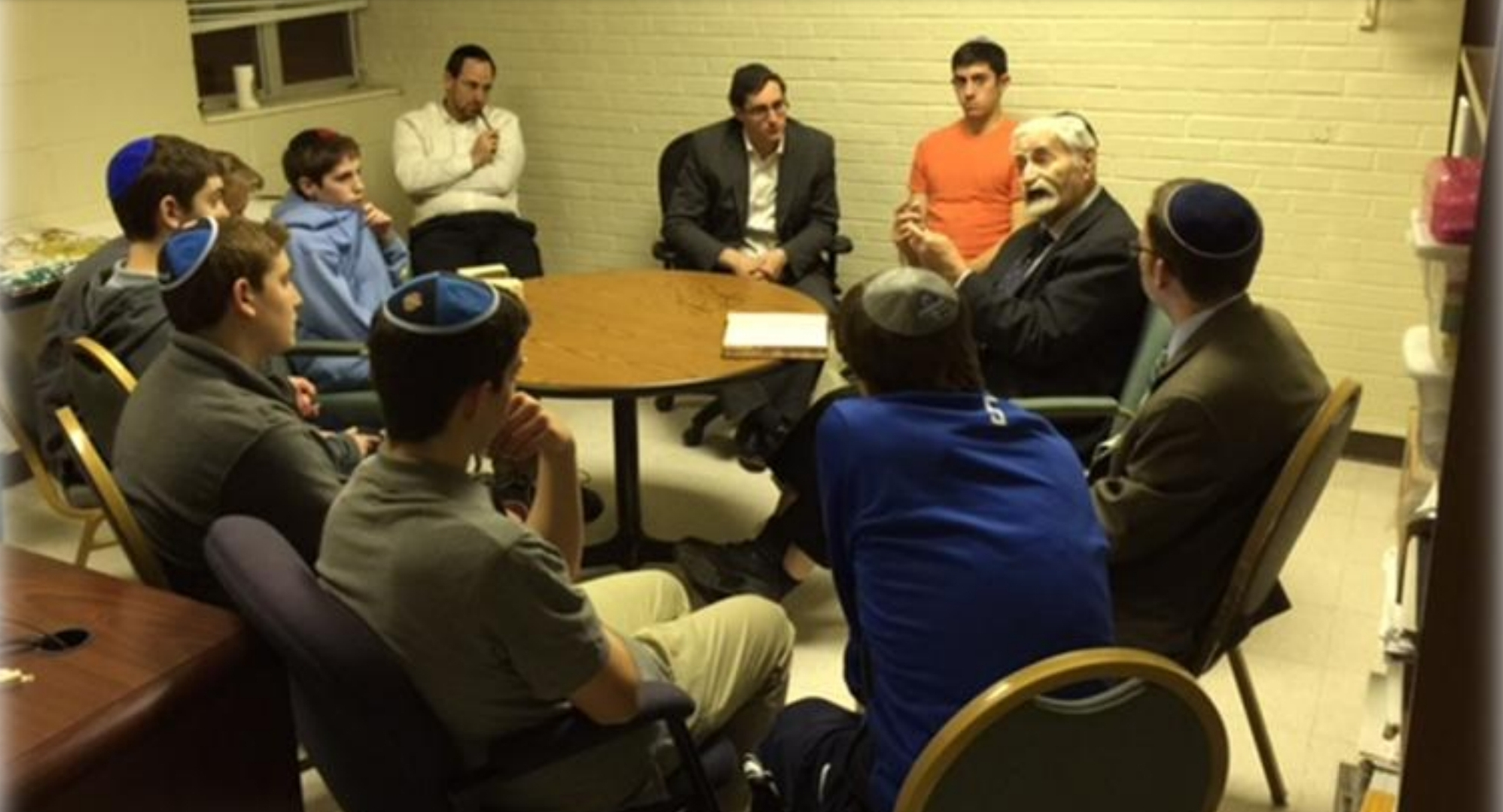
"Mishmar" Chaburah at a Torah High School in Memphis.

A shi'ur (/ˈʃiːər/, Hebrew: שיעור [ʃiˈʔuʁ], lit. 'amount'; pl. shi'urim, שיעורים [ʃiʔuˈʁim]) is a lecture given on any Torah-related topic of study, such as Gemara, Mishnah, Halakha (Jewish law), or Tanakh (Hebrew Bible), usually in a yeshiva but also in other Jewish communal settings.

== History ==
The Hebrew term שיעור ("designated amount") came to refer to a portion of Judaic text arranged for study on a particular occasion, such as a yahrzeit, the dedication of a new home, or the evening of a holiday, and then to a public reading and explanation of the same. The act of teaching and studying these texts at the designated time was known as shiur lernen (Yiddish: שיעור לערנען, lit. 'study of the portion'); by synecdoche, the act itself became known as shiur. These shiurim would be attended by all classes of people; it was traditional for learned attendees to engage the lecturer in continuous discussion, and for the larger lay audience to listen intently.

Concurrently, in the yeshiva-setting it came to refer to the daily study quotient for students, and then to the lecture given thereon. Akiva Eger, for example,

would not miss learning a single shiur with the yeshiva. His shiurim with them were always three per day: there was a session of Talmud and Tosafot, a session of exhaustive Halakha, and a session of Shulchan Aruch and Magen Avraham, and these were aside from the session of Tur and Shulchan Aruch Yoreh De'ah he would learn with his children and some students, and with these he would learn a further shiur of exhaustive Talmud and Tosafot at night.

== Yeshiva learning ==
"Shiur" will typically refer to the type of learning that takes place in yeshivot and kollelim, where students hear an in-depth lecture on the Gemara topic, or sugya, they are studying at the time. Shiurim are also offered in yeshiva on Halakha, as well in mussar, Chumash, and hashkafah (Jewish philosophy), depending on the yeshiva and the learning level of its students. The shiur is likewise the typical format for classes at women's seminaries and midrashot.

=== Format ===
Typically, yeshiva students attend a shiur yomi (daily lecture) given by a maggid shiur (literally, "sayer of the shiur") and a weekly shiur klali (comprehensive lecture, which sums up the week's learning) given by the rosh yeshiva. The rosh yeshiva usually also gives the senior shiur—see below—on a daily basis.

Before the shiur, a bibliography and a series of textual references, or mar'e mekomot, are posted so that students may prepare for the lecture in advance. Students typically spend several hours preparing for the shiur yomi. After the shiur, students spend additional time reviewing and clarifying the lesson that they have just heard. These preparation and review periods take place in a special time period called a seder, in which students study the lesson individually and/or in chavrutot (study pairs).

The shiur itself proceeds as a discursive-review (an approach akin to the Socratic Method) addressing "all interpretations of [the] passage" - i.e. sugya - in question. Typically, the maggid shiur presents an initial series of logical questions, identifying difficulties (kashyas) and contradictions within or between sources; they will then offer a sevara (theory) or chakira (differentiation), often novel, such that "all the problematic sources will make sense and work together harmoniously". See further under Gemara § Argumentation and debate.

=== Class levels ===
For Talmud-study, the level of complexity and understanding expected from students increases each year, successively incorporating additional layers of commentary and perspectives, and with the analysis compounding correspondingly; see Yeshiva § Talmud study.

Thus, following on from the practice of the Telz Yeshiva, studies are typically organized by level. The term "shiur" is then used to differentiate different classes, so that first-year students are typically said to be in "Shiur Aleph"; second-year students in "Shiur Bet"; and third-year students in "Shiur Gimmel", etc. Strong students may be "promoted", but it is less common for a student to be held back.

Commonly the fourth Shiur is that of the Rosh Yeshiva, head of the institution. Here students consolidate the approach to study, or "derech ha-limud", emphasized by their yeshiva. See Rosh yeshiva § Role.

In kollelim ("post-graduate" institutions), the shiurim address a yet more advanced level of study, with students learning independently, although under guidance of the rosh kollel; Rabbinic ordination, Semicha, programs similarly require that students have attained a high level in Talmud, this being the base for their advanced study of Halacha. Typically, then, before joining a kollel or pursuing ordination, students are required to have learned in the "Rosh Yeshiva's Shiur" for at least two years.

=== Related structures ===
Some Orthodox yeshivot—such as Ner Yisroel and Kollel Etz Chaim—organize learning (at senior levels) in "chaburahs". Here, the members of the chaburah all focus on the same specific area or work of Torah study, (informally) led by the rosh-chaburah.

A more senior study group in a Yeshiva is sometimes referred to as a "Kibbutz", especially in older usage, preceding the use of that term for an agricultural community. The members of the Kibbutz proceed independent of a shiur. See for example Sunderland Talmudical College § The Kibbutz and Yeshiva Ohel Torah-Baranovich § Style of learning.

== Public study sessions ==
Synagogue rabbis and noted rabbis also give shiurim to their communities. In shuls, the shiur given between the Mincha and Maariv services is usually geared to baalebatim (laymen). Noted rabbis give more in-depth shiurim to attendees on Shabbat or weekday evenings, usually in the local synagogue or beth midrash (study hall).

(Public) shiurim range in length and depth: from a short "vort", or "Dvar Torah" ("word (of Torah)", in Yiddish and Hebrew respectively), to a detailed "drasha" ("study", from the Aramaic; see midrash); the former above, baalebatim focused, is a vort, while the latter is a drosha. Especially in Chasidic settings, a less formal—often inspirational—shiur may be termed "sicha" (שיחה, lit. "speech"); see also Maamor and Maamarim (Chabad).

Commonly, the Rosh Yeshiva delivers a weekly shiur on the parashah (weekly Torah portion), exploring a particular question or theme. This is usually in-depth, of an hour in duration, and typically open to the public.

Many yeshivot, midrashot, and "community kollels" host yemei iyun ("days of in-depth learning"; sing.: yom iyun), where community members study a specific topic. These are often held before religious holidays—especially Pesach and the New Year period—preparing the spiritual and halakhik elements of the upcoming festival.

A "Memorial Shiur" is often given to the entire yeshiva / community on the Yahrzeit of a (founding) Rosh Yeshiva or Rabbi; usually exploring a specific topic of general interest.

"Shiur" may include any kind of Torah lesson—including lectures to children, women, and baalebatim (lay audience), and taped lectures circulated via cassette tape, computer, MP3 or MP4 file, or call-in telephone lines. Some kiruv organizations advertise "five-minute shiurim" to attract new listeners.

Similarly, "Vort" and "Dvar Torah", may refer to any short Torah idea, (often linked to that week's parsha) delivered on various occasions, and not necessarily by a Rabbi; for example: by the host at their Shabbat table, by the leader before "Benching" (grace after meals), or by a guest at sheva brachot, or any Seudat mitzvah.
