= 100 Squadron =

100 Squadron may refer to:

- 100 Squadron (Israel), an Israeli Air Force unit
- No. 100 Squadron RAF (100 Sqn), a Royal Air Force unit
- No. 100 Squadron RAAF, a Royal Australian Air Force unit
