= Mishmar HaShlosha =

Mishmar HaShlosha משמר השלושה
- Local council
- Location within Northeast Israel Location within Israel
- Coordinates: 32°42′45″N 35°30′11″E
- Country: Israel
- District: Northern
- Founded: 13 April 1937
- Name meaning: Sentinel of the Three

Mishmar HaShlosha (Hebrew: משמר השלושה, lit. 'Sentinel of the Three') was a moshav in the eastern part of the Lower Galilee, located in the Yavne'el Valley and adjacent to the moshava Yavne'el. Mishmar HaShlosha officially became part of Yavne'el in 1953.

The moshav was founded on 13 April 1937 on lands purchased by the Palestine Jewish Colonization Association. It was a Tower and stockade settlement, established to populate the area between Beit Gan and Yavne'el.

The village was named for three residents of Yavne'el, Moshe Zalman Ben-Sasson, Yehuda Aliovic and Gedaliah Geller, who on March 14, 1937 walked from Beit Gan towards Yavne'el and were murdered by Arabs on the way.
