= Eliezer Shlomo Schick =

Israeli-American rabbi

Rabbi Eliezer Shlomo Schick אליעזר שלמה שיק
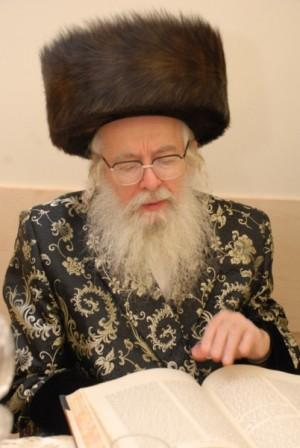

Personal life
- Born: Eliezer Shlomo Schick; May 29, 1940 Jerusalem, Mandatory Palestine
- Died: February 6, 2015 (aged 74) New York City
- Buried: Yavne'el, Israel
- Spouse: Shifra Rotenberg
- Children: Nachman Alexander Zusia; Toba; Perel; Devora; Nussen Moshe Shmiel
- Parent(s): Rabbi Menachem Zev Schick; Malka
- Education: Mesivtha Tifereth Jerusalem

Religious life
- Religion: Judaism
- Denomination: Hasidic Judaism
- Position: Founder
- Organisation: Mesivta Heichal Hakodesh
- Began: 1962
- Ended: 2015
- Other: Founder and leader of "Breslov City" in Yavne'el, Israel
- Residence: Brooklyn, New York

Rabbi Eliezer Shlomo Schick (Hebrew: אליעזר שלמה שיק; May 29, 1940 – February 6, 2015), also known as Mohorosh (acronym for Moreinu HaRav Eliezer Shlomo, "Our teacher, our rabbi, Eliezer Shlomo", מוהרא"ש מברסלב) was a controversial Hasidic rabbi and prolific author. He wrote and disseminated approximately 1,000 different pamphlets ostensibly based on the teachings of Rebbe Nachman of Breslov. He was the founder and leader of the self-styled "Breslov City" in the Galilee town of Yavne'el, Israel, and had thousands of followers around the world, in a group that has been described as a cult. He was criticised for enabling a culture of sexual abuse and encouraging child marriage among his followers.

== Early life ==
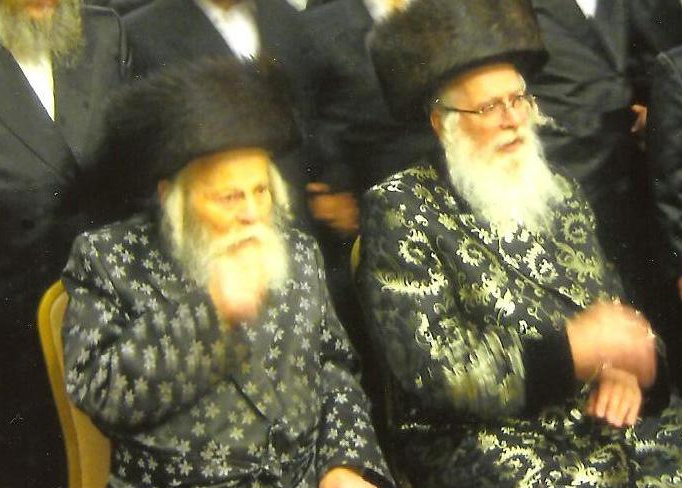
Together with his father-in-law, Rabbi Asher Yeshaya Rottenberg of Koson

Eliezer Shlomo Schick was born in Jerusalem, Israel, to Rabbi Menachem Zev, the gaavad (head of the rabbinical court) of Tokaj, Hungary, and his wife Malka. As a young boy, he learned in the Etz Chaim cheder. When he was a youth, his family relocated to New York City, where he studied in the Kashau yeshiva and then in Mesivtha Tifereth Jerusalem under Rabbi Moshe Feinstein.

At the age of 15, Schick came across the popular Breslov booklet Meshivat Nefesh by Rabbi Alter Tepliker, which attracted him to Rebbe Nachman's teachings. He claimed that, at this age, he began to spend many hours each day in hitbodedut per Rebbe Nachman's instructions, and studied more Torah in accordance with Rebbe Nachman's system of learning.

In 1962 he married Shifra Rotenberg, daughter of the Kossoner Rav, Rabbi Asher Yeshaya Halevi Rotenberg.

== Hasidic teacher ==
After his marriage, he began delivering shiurim in Hasidic thought to avreichim (married Torah students) and bochurim (unmarried men) in Boro Park, and began corresponding with students and others who sought his advice to strengthen their own religious observance.

In the 1970s Schick began writing small pamphlets distilling the lessons and teachings of Rebbe Nachman. He eventually authored, printed, and distributed approximately 1,000 titles in Hebrew, hundreds of which were translated into English. The pamphlets were criticised for misrepresenting Rebbe Nachman’s teachings and offering misleading or false interpretations of them.

Shick was condemned by senior figures from the traditional Breslov community, including Levi Yitzchok Bender, who published a letter criticising his works in the name of the community.

He also printed thousands of copies of Rebbe Nachman’s Likutei Moharan and Sippurei Maasiyos and sold them at cost price, popularizing Breslov teachings around the world. Among present-day Breslov leaders who were introduced to Breslov teachings through Schick's pamphlets was Rabbi Shalom Arush.

Additionally, Schick wrote dozens of sefarim, among them Erech Apayim (on anger management), Ilan Hachaim (on not wasting time), and commentaries on Rebbe Nachman's works.

== Community leader ==
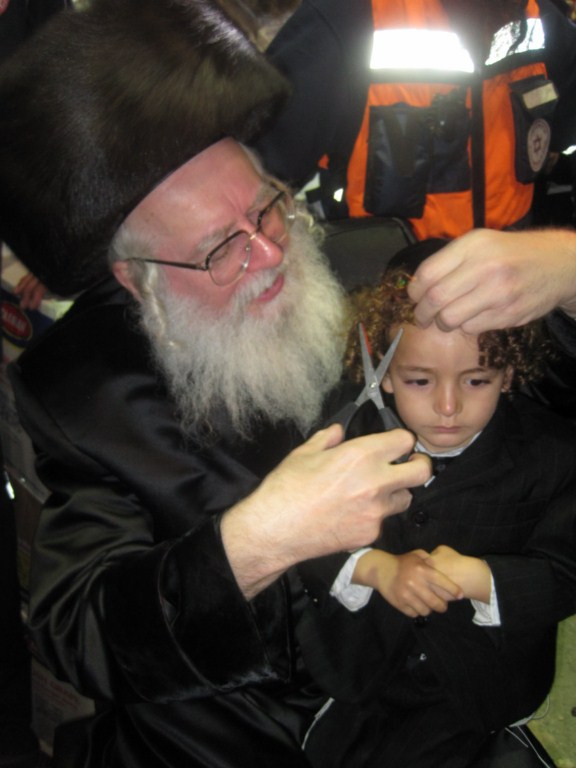
Schick at an upsherin in Yavne'el

Beginning in the 1980s, Schick began visiting his Hasidim in Israel regularly, and established a synagogue in Safed. In 1985 he founded the Heichal Hakodesh Breslov community – largely consisting of baalei teshuvah (newly religious adherents) – in the Lower Galilee town of Yavne'el, Israel. This community, which calls itself "Breslov City", numbered nearly 400 families as of 2015, representing 30 percent of the town's population. The community maintains its own schools and civic organizations, including a Talmud Torah, girls' school, yeshiva ketana, yeshiva gedola, kollel, and chesed and tzedaka organizations. A large beis medrash (study/prayer hall) was completed in 2012.

The community has been accused of using violence and intimidation to suppress dissent. Critics and former members also alleged that Schick was aware of sexual abuse within the Yavne’el community.

Shick also created and sold expensive amulets to his followers that he claimed would protect them.

Schick divided his time between his homes in Yavne'el and Boro Park. He also established synagogues in Monsey, Monroe, and Williamsburg, and spoke at them frequently. He had thousands of Hasidim around the world.

Schick also established a Yeshiva "Tifereth Hatorah" in Williamsburg for Breslover students, led by Rabbi Yoel Roth.

== Final years ==
In April 2012, Schick suffered a heart attack and underwent surgery, from which he recovered. In 2015 he was treated for the final stages of leukemia at Memorial Sloan Kettering Cancer Center in New York City, where he died on February 6, 2015. He was buried in Yavne'el.

Schick left more than 120 volumes of responsa, consisting of nearly 75,000 letters and other unpublished writings. The collection is known as Shailos U'teshuvos Asher B'Nachal. Historians have suggested that Shick fabricated at least part of the responsa he published.

== Legacy ==
In 2023, the documentary In the Name of the Father (A Hasidic Crime Story), directed by Bat Dor Ojalvo, took an in-depth look at the controversial Breslov Hasidic community of Yavne'el, Israel, and its leader, Rabbi Eliezer Shlomo Schick, known as Mohorosh. The film highlighted the shocking revelations that emerged after Schick's death regarding the inner workings of the community, which had been shrouded in secrecy. Central to the documentary’s findings were allegations of widespread corruption, abuse, violence, sexual assault, and forced child marriages. These disturbing practices were perpetuated under the guise of religious devotion and absolute loyalty to the late rabbi's teachings. The documentary painted a grim portrait of the community’s manipulation and control over its members, using fear and isolation to protect its interests. It also explored the conflict that arose after Schick's death when two wills were discovered, one favoring his son Moishi and the other benefiting prominent community leaders. This division further fueled the scandal and brought the hidden crimes into the public eye.

The documentary sparked outrage across Israel, with many citizens and advocacy groups calling for justice and accountability. As a result, police investigations were launched, with a focus on uncovering the systemic abuse that had been concealed for decades. In the Name of the Father was instrumental in revealing the lengths to which the community had gone to maintain its control, using surveillance and coercion to silence dissent. Testimonies from former members—some of whom had been victims of the abuse—came forward to share their harrowing experiences. These included accounts of sexual abuse, the forcing of underage girls into marriages, and physical violence aimed at enforcing loyalty and obedience. The film also highlighted the ongoing trauma faced by survivors who had been victims of these practices.
