= Galilee Squadron =

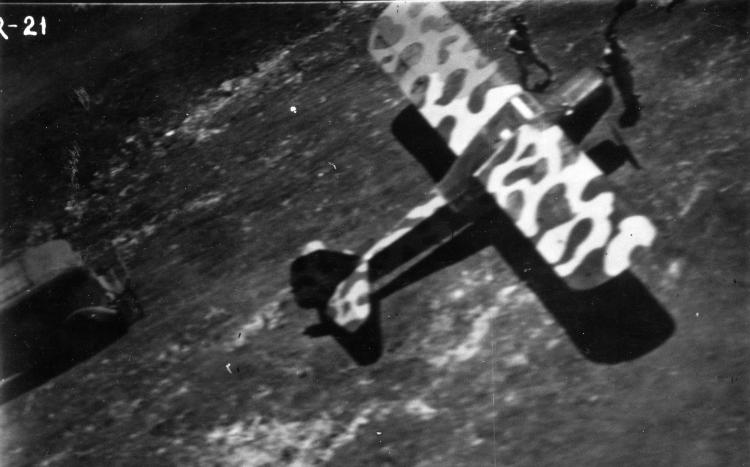
Camouflaged Galilee Squadron Auster Autocrat, 1948

The Galilee Squadron (Hebrew: טייסת הגליל, Tayeset Ha-Galil) was an aerial unit established by the Yeshuv (Jewish residents of Palestine) during the 1948 Arab-Israeli War to assist the Jewish war effort in northern Palestine. Initially a part of the Sherut Avir, the aerial arm of the Haganah, it was absorbed into the fledgling Israeli Air Force (IAF) upon the latter's formation on 28 May 1948. The unit served throughout the war, following which it was amalgamated with several other units to form the IAF's 100 Squadron.

== History ==
=== Formation and initial operations ===
On 10 November 1947, with the impending decision on the partition of Palestine and the increasing likelihood of violent confrontations with their Arab neighbours, the leadership of the Yeshuv announced the establishment of the Sherut Avir (SA, Air Service). Operating a collection of light aircraft from Sde Dov outside Tel Aviv, the SA flew supply, communications, observation and medical evacuation flights, and occasionally even participated in combat.

As fighting intensified throughout the region in early 1948, however, the SA's sole squadron in Tel Aviv could not meet all operational needs. Soon new detachments were deployed to the Negev and the Galilee, where several aircraft begun operating from the former RAF landing ground at Mahanayim in support of the newly formed Golani Brigade. When the brigade moved its headquarters to Yavne'el, three SA aircraft deployed to an airstrip constructed there. On 4 April 1948, two Auster Autocrats, three pilots and two mechanics, were formed into the SA's Galilee section, headed by Pesach Tolchinky. On 25 April, the unit was officially designated the SA's 3rd Squadron and given the callsign "Lavi" (Lion).

The squadron went into action on the very day of its formation. Early 1948 had seen the Yeshuv on the defensive, with Arab forces dominating the roads and attacking Jewish transportation. On 4 April, with Mishmar HaEmek under assault from Fawzi al-Qawuqji's Arab Liberation Army (ALA), the squadron flew its first sorties, with Golani observers on board. Three days later it dropped ammunition to the beleaguered kibbutz, and 9 April saw its first combat mission, dropping hand-held bombs on al-Qawuqji's Syrian artillery. In all, about a dozen sorties were flown during the Battle of Mishmar HaEmek. The battle, in which the ALA was repulsed and neighbouring Palestinian villages taken, signaled a change of policy for Jewish forces in the north, and these now went on the offensive.

On 27 April, an Auster Autocrat assisted a Haganah force take control of the evacuated British Tegart fort at Samakh. Fighting intensified as the end of the British Mandate for Palestine drew near. During the first half of May, the squadron flew 180 sorties, an average of four sorties per pilot per day and as many as nine. These were predominantly reconnaissance, medical evacuation and supply flights, but also included combat missions. On 1 May, the settlement (moshav) of Ramot Naftali came under attack from ALA forces which far outnumbered and outgunned its 45 Jewish defenders. With Operation Yiftah and the battles for Safed underway, there were no ground forces available to provide assistance. The Galilee Squadron came to Ramot Naftali's aid, making nine bombing and strafing sorties against the attacking forces; its aircraft suffered extensive damage from ground fire but forced an Arab withdrawal and saved the moshav.

=== Israeli independence and Arab invasion ===
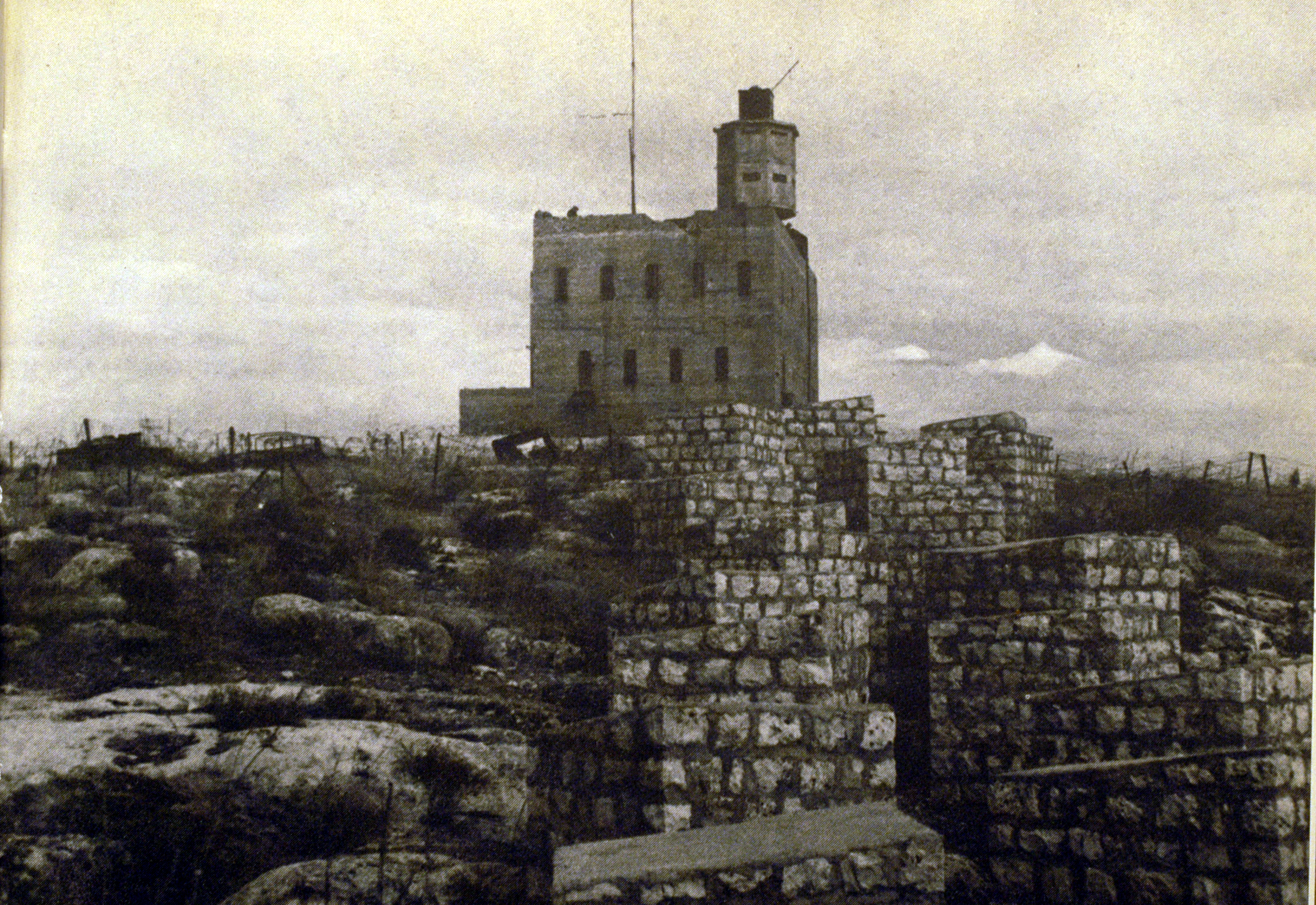
Nebi Yusha fort, 1948

Following Israel's declaration of independence on 14 May 1948, the territory of the former Mandate of Palestine was invaded by several Arab armies. While the Galilee Squadron had hitherto faced the Arab Liberation Army and Palestinian irregulars, it was now forced to contend with the Lebanese, Iraqi and Syrian armies as well. On 14 May, the squadron participated in the battle between the Lebanese Army and the Palmach for Al-Malkiyya, which fell to the Lebanese. On the following night, the squadron went into action against Iraqi forces operating in the Jordan valley. Navigating by the fires caused by the Syrian bombardment of Masada and Sha'ar HaGolan, an Autocrat attempted to bomb a bridge across the Jordan River, but instead hit fuel tanks of the Iraqi Petroleum Company, almost causing the aircraft to crash in the resulting explosion. May 16 witnessed the squadron assisting the Palmach to take the fort at Nabi Yusha, which had already repulsed two assaults in April. The squadron's Autocrats and Fairchild Argus dropped incendiary bombs on the fort, but inflicted little damage. Its Lebanese defenders nevertheless abandoned it by morning to reinforce Al-Malkiyya.

The Arab invasion also introduced the prospect of encounters with the Syrian Air Force (SAF). Although not particularly powerful, the SAF fielded the North American Harvard and Avro Anson aircraft in the attack and bombing roles. Both were superior to the types operated by the Galilee Squadron. Syrian Harvards twice, on May 17 and 19, attempted to shoot down the Galilee's light aircraft. Following the latter incident, the squadron was forced to relocate to Mahanayim after an SAF Harvard had followed its quarry to discover the airfield at Yavne'el. Soon, however, Mahanayim came under attack from both Syrian Harvards and artillery as well. On 9 June, the squadron moved to Ramat David. Operations nevertheless continued apace, with no let-up in the fighting on several fronts.

The squadron returned to Al-Malkiyya on 29 May for the second battle at the village. Although the assault was successful, the village fell to Lebanese forces again on 5 June. It would change hands several more times until finally taken by Israeli forces. Late May and early June also witnessed the squadron support Israeli forces operating in the vicinity of Jenin. Bombing missions were flown against the local police station, though Israeli forces were ultimately forced to withdraw. Shortly before the first truce of the war went into effect on 11 June, the squadron helped repulse an ALA assault on the town of Sejera and bombed the nearby village of Lubya.

=== Later activities ===
The first truce allowed both sides to regroup and recuperate. On the Israeli side, the pre-state institutions were transformed into the agencies of a state. The truce witnessed the transformation of the Israeli Air Force, formally established on May 28, into a comprehensive fighting force. The Sherut Avir was absorbed into this new organization, and it was reorganized, fighter aircraft were acquired and personnel recruited. The Galilee Squadron received new equipment and personnel as well, and exploited the lull in the fighting to conduct reconnaissance all over the north. On 19 June, it returned to Yavne'el.

When fighting resumed on 9 July, Israel's primary objectives were the expulsion of the Arab Liberation Army and Syrian forces from the Galilee. Two Israeli Defence Forces (IDF) operations were therefore put into motion, Dekel (Palm Tree) in the eastern Galilee and Brosh (Cypress) in the west, with the squadron supporting both. In the 10 days of fighting that raged until a second truce went into effect on July 18, the Galilee Squadron carried out 91 bombing sorties and dropped six tons of bombs.

The second truce of the war lasted until October 1948. The squadron spent this time stepping up training and reconnaissance flights. The airfield at Yavne'el, still threatened by the Syrian Air Force, was also upgraded with the installation of its first anti-aircraft cannons and decoy aircraft. Fighting in the Galilee resumed on 22 October with an attack by the ALA on Menara and the mountains overlooking the Galilee Panhandle. Israeli forces, supported by the Galilee Squadron, failed to dislodge the ALA from the territory it had captured. On 29 October, however, the IDF launched Operation Hiram, which pushed the ALA back into Lebanon and effectively marked its demise. Hiram began with IAF air attacks against key village and ALA positions in the upper Galilee, though these were carried out by the IAF's heavier assets, such as 69 Squadron's B-17s and 103 Squadron's C-47s. The Galilee Squadron flew eight bombing sorties during the two-day operation, as well as reconnaissance and leaflet dropping missions.

In late November 1948, the coming of winter and the poor state of the airfield at Yavne'el once again prompted the squadron to relocate to Ramat David. A month later, the IAF decided to disband both the Galilee and Negev Squadrons, their role having been taken over by squadrons flying more capable aircraft. The two moved to Tel Nof where they were amalgamated with the Tel Aviv Squadron to form the IAF's 100 "Flying Camel" Squadron. The Galilee Squadron was officially disbanded on 28 January 1949.

== Commemoration ==
Galilee Squadron memorial

A memorial to the Galilee Squadron and its men stands in Yavne'el's Goren Park.

== Commanders ==
- Pesach Tolchinky (6–21 April 1948)
- Daniel Bookstein (21 April – 10 May 1948)
- Moshe Feldman (10 May – 6 August 1948)
- Nahum Rapoport (6 August – 17 November 1948)
- Haim Goldman (17–30 November 1948)
- Yosef Steinman (30 November 1948 – 17 January 1949)
- Aharon Biran (17–30 January 1949)

== Aircraft flown ==
- Taylorcraft BL
- Auster AOP5
- Auster J1 Autocrat
- Fairchild F24R Argus
- Piper PA-11 Cub Special
