= Moshava =

Agricultural Jewish settlement in the region of Palestine (now Israel)

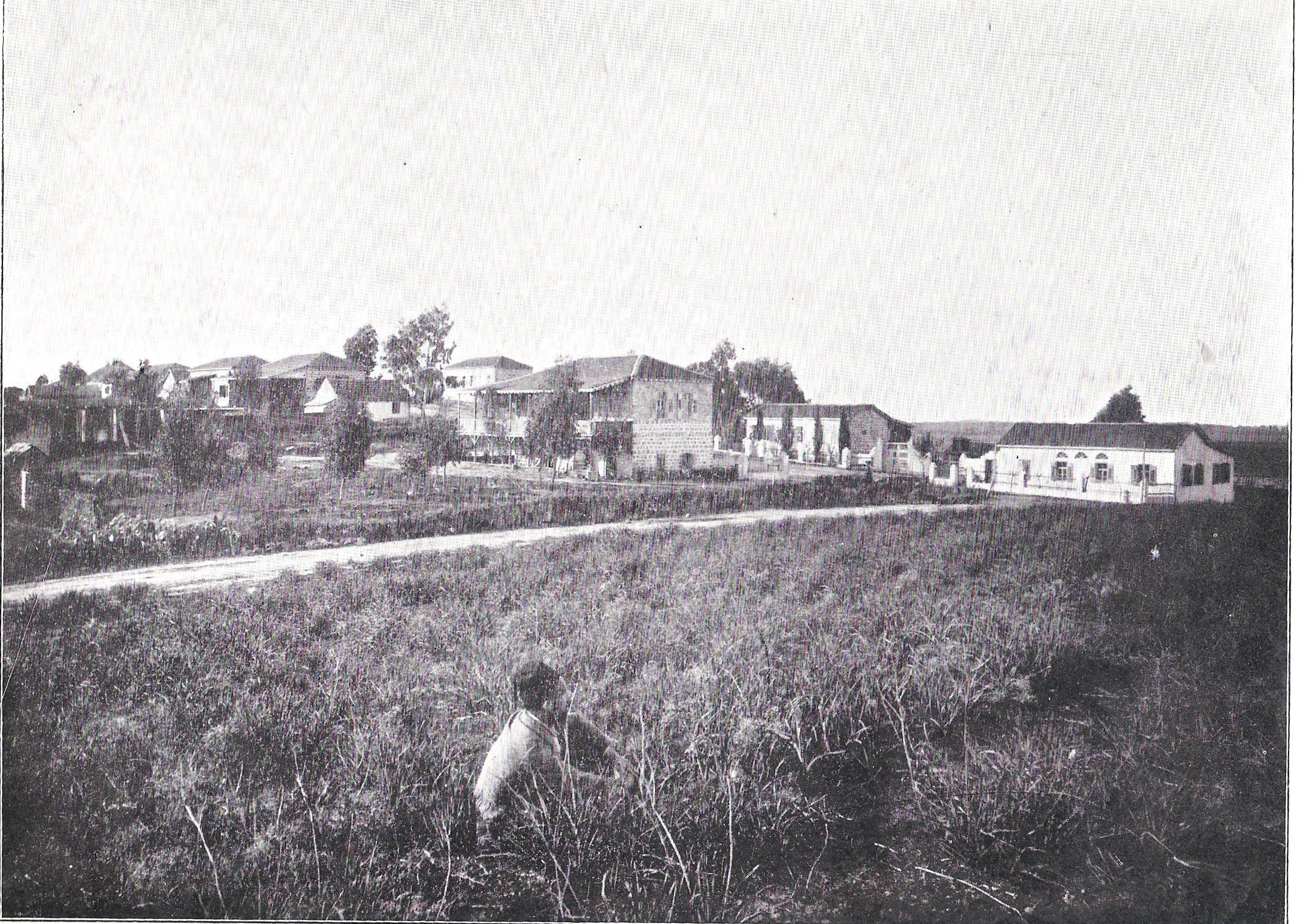
Gedera, before 1899

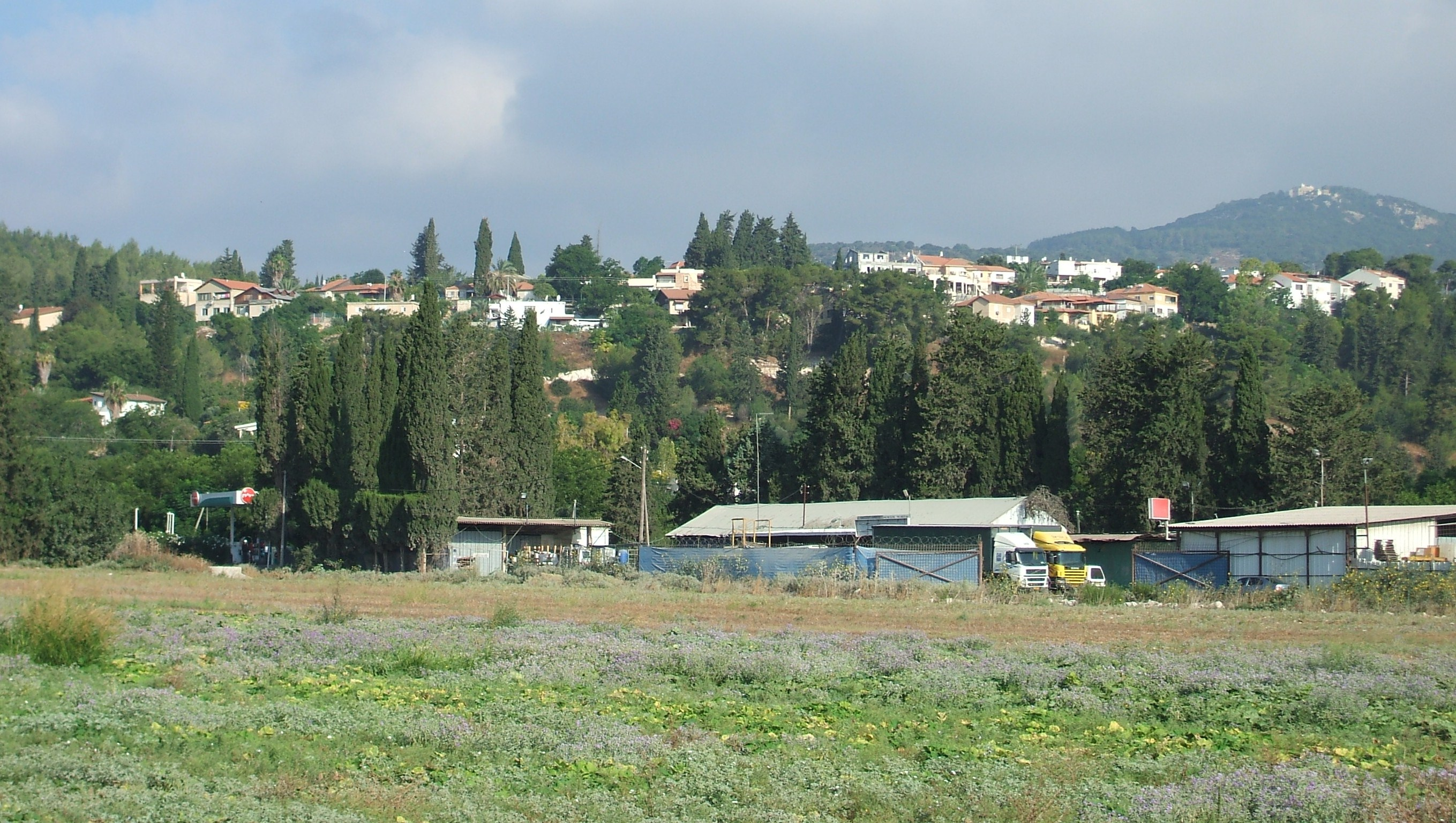
Yokneam (moshava)

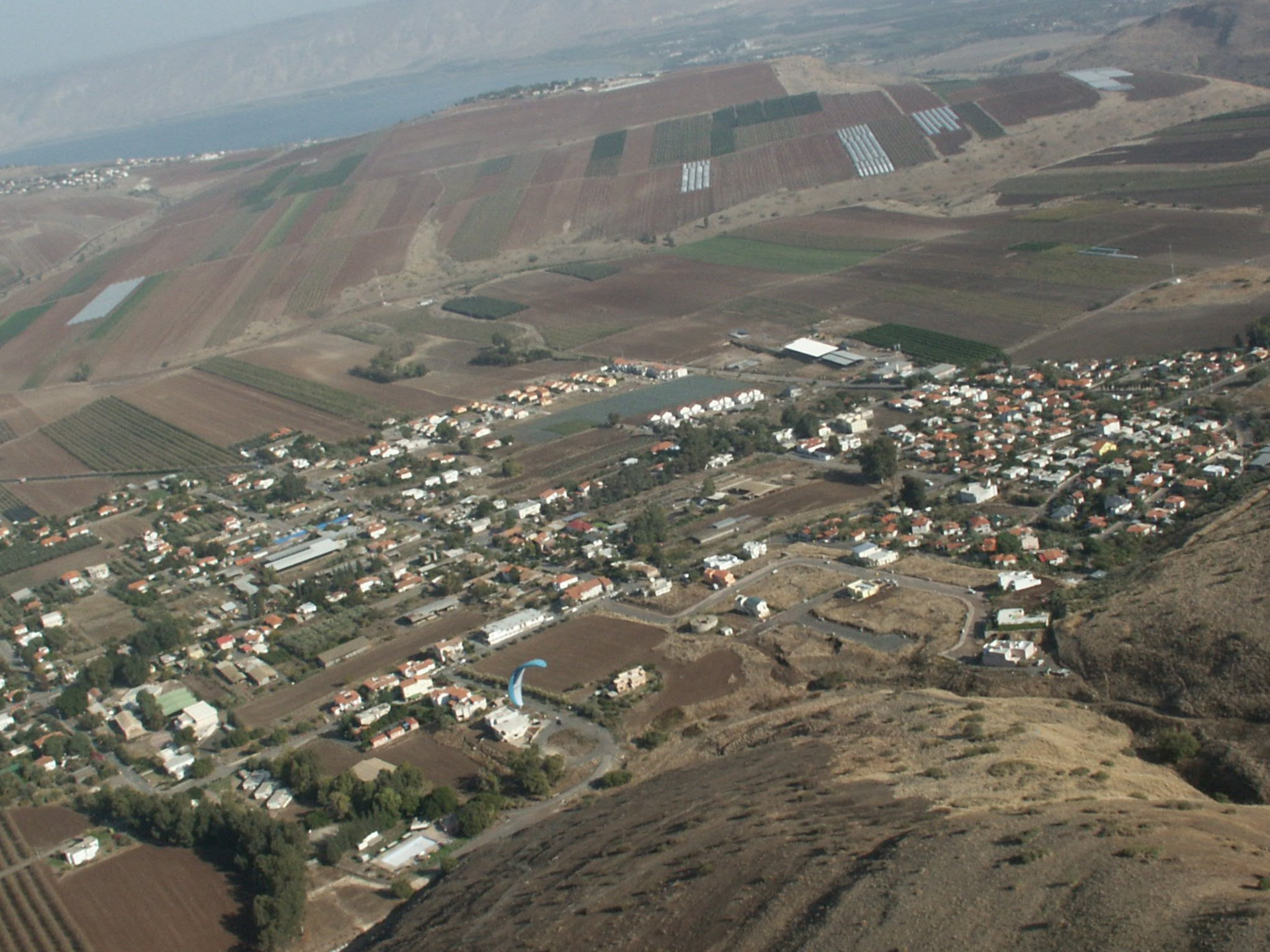
Yavne'el (moshava)

A moshava (Hebrew: מושבה, plural: moshavot מושבות, lit. colony) was a form of agricultural Jewish settlement in the region of Palestine (now Israel), established by the members of the Old Yishuv beginning in the late 1870s and during the first two waves of Jewish Zionist immigration – the First and Second Aliyah.

== History ==
In a moshava, as opposed to later communal settlements like the kibbutz and the moshav (plural moshavim), all the land and property are privately owned. The first moshavot were established by the members of the Jewish community already living in, and by pioneers of the arriving to, Ottoman Syria. The economy of the early moshavot was based on agriculture and resembled the grain-growing villages of eastern Europe in layout. Farms were established along both sides of a broad main street.

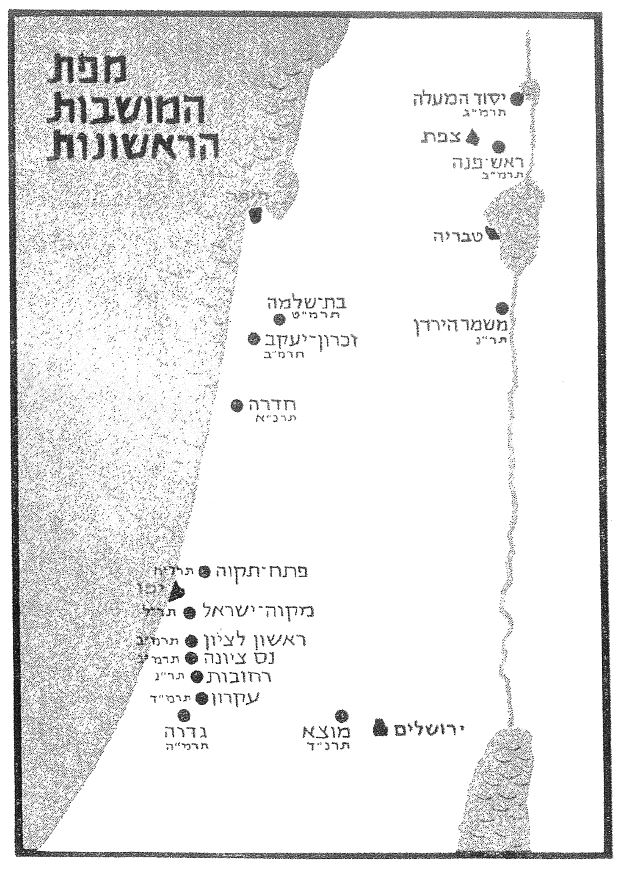
Map of old moshavot

Petah Tikva, nicknamed the "Mother of Moshavot" (Em HaMoshavot), was founded in 1878 by members of the Old Yishuv, as well as Gai Oni, which later became Rosh Pinna with the arrival of the First Aliyah. The first four moshavot of the First Aliyah period were Rishon LeZion, Rosh Pinna, Zikhron Ya'akov and Yesud HaMa'ala.

One of the driving forces behind these early settlements was the Hovevei Zion movement in Europe, whose branches operated as financially independent settlement societies.

The moshava was governed by a charter outlining communal principles that established a covenant or bond between the residents.

== Old Yishuv and First Aliyah moshavot ==
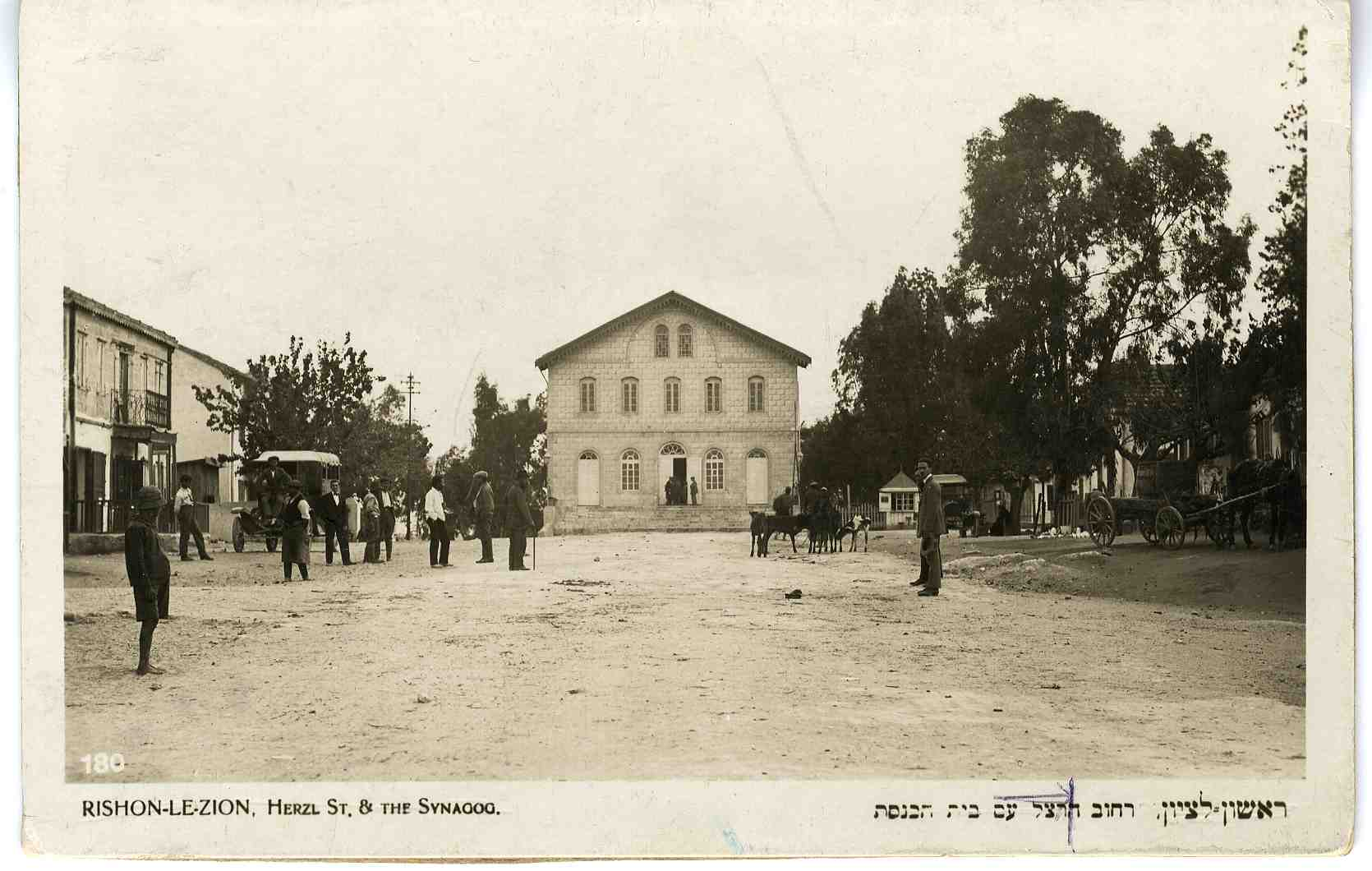
Great Synagogue of Rishon LeZion, founded in 1885 (photo c. 1910–1924)

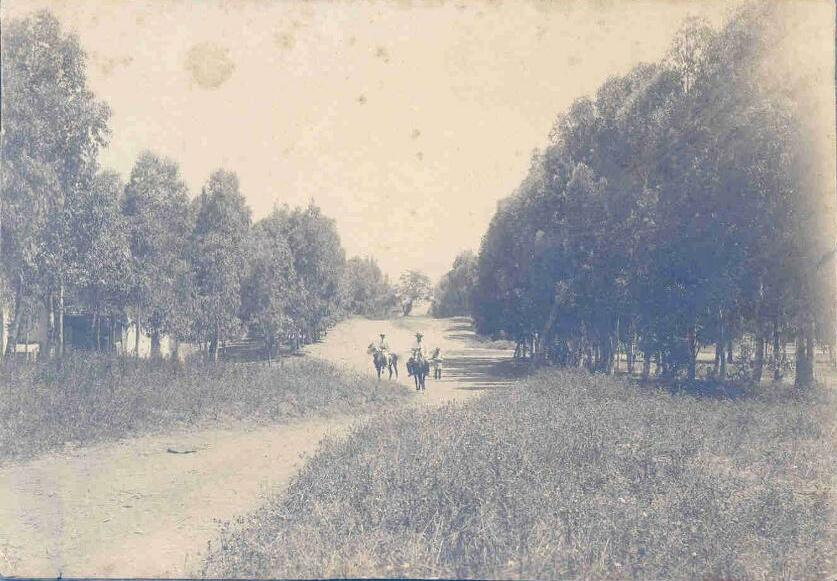
Herzl Street, Hadera, c. 1891–1901

Chronological list by year of establishment.

- Rishon LeZion (1882)
- Rosh Pinna (1882, taking over and renaming the colony of Gei Oni established in 1878 and down to three families by 1882)
- Zikhron Ya'akov (1882)
- Petah Tikva (1882; reestablished after first attempt in 1878)
- Mazkeret Batya (1883 established as "Ekron")
- Ness Ziona (1883; began as "Nahalat Reuven")
- Yesud HaMa'ala (1883)
- Gedera (1884)
- Bat Shlomo (1889)
- Meir Shfeya (1889)
- Rehovot (1890)
- Mishmar HaYarden (1890)
- Hadera (1891)
- Ein Zeitim (1892)
- Motza (1894)
- Hartuv (1895)
- Metula (1896)
- Be'er Tuvia (1896 reestablished and renamed by Hovevei Zion; first settled in 1887 as Castina for nearby Qastina)
- Bnei Yehuda (1898; not identical with the new Bnei Yehuda)
- Mahanayim (1898–1912)
- Sejera (1899–1902), now Moshav Ilaniya
- Mas'ha (1901), renamed Kfar Tavor in 1903
- Yavne'el (1901)
- Menahemia (1901)
- Beit Gan (1903; next to Yavne'el)
- Atlit (1903)
- Giv'at Ada (1903)
- Kfar Saba (1904)

Colonies were also established in the Hauran on lands bought by Baron Edmond de Rothschild in the area of the villages of Sahem al-Jawlan, Jileen and Nafa’a, by immigrants of the First Aliyah in a total of nine outposts, but the main five colonies, founded in 1895, had to be abandoned within a short while:

- Tiferet Binyamin (1895)
- Zichron Menachem (1895)
- Nahalat Moshe (1895)
- Achvat Yisrael (1895)
- Beit Ikar (1895).

== Second and Third Aliyah moshavot ==
- Kinneret (1908, Second Aliyah)
- Binyamina (1922, Third Aliyah and people from Zikhron Ya'akov )

== See also ==
- Motza farm, est. 1854 by Old Yishuv members, later a village
- Mikveh Israel agricultural school, est. 1880 by the Alliance Israélite Universelle
