= 100 Squadron (Israel) =

Israeli military unit

- טייסת הגמל המעופף
- Active: June 1949-present
- Country: Israel
- Branch: Israeli Air Force
- Role: Liaison and supply missions
- Garrison/HQ: Hatzor Airbase

The 100 Squadron of the Israeli Air Force, also known as the Flying Camel Squadron, is a Beechcraft King Air and Beechcraft Bonanza squadron with patrol aircraft.

Between 1959 and 2019, the squadron was based at Sde Dov Airport. In 2019 it moved to Hatzor Airbase.

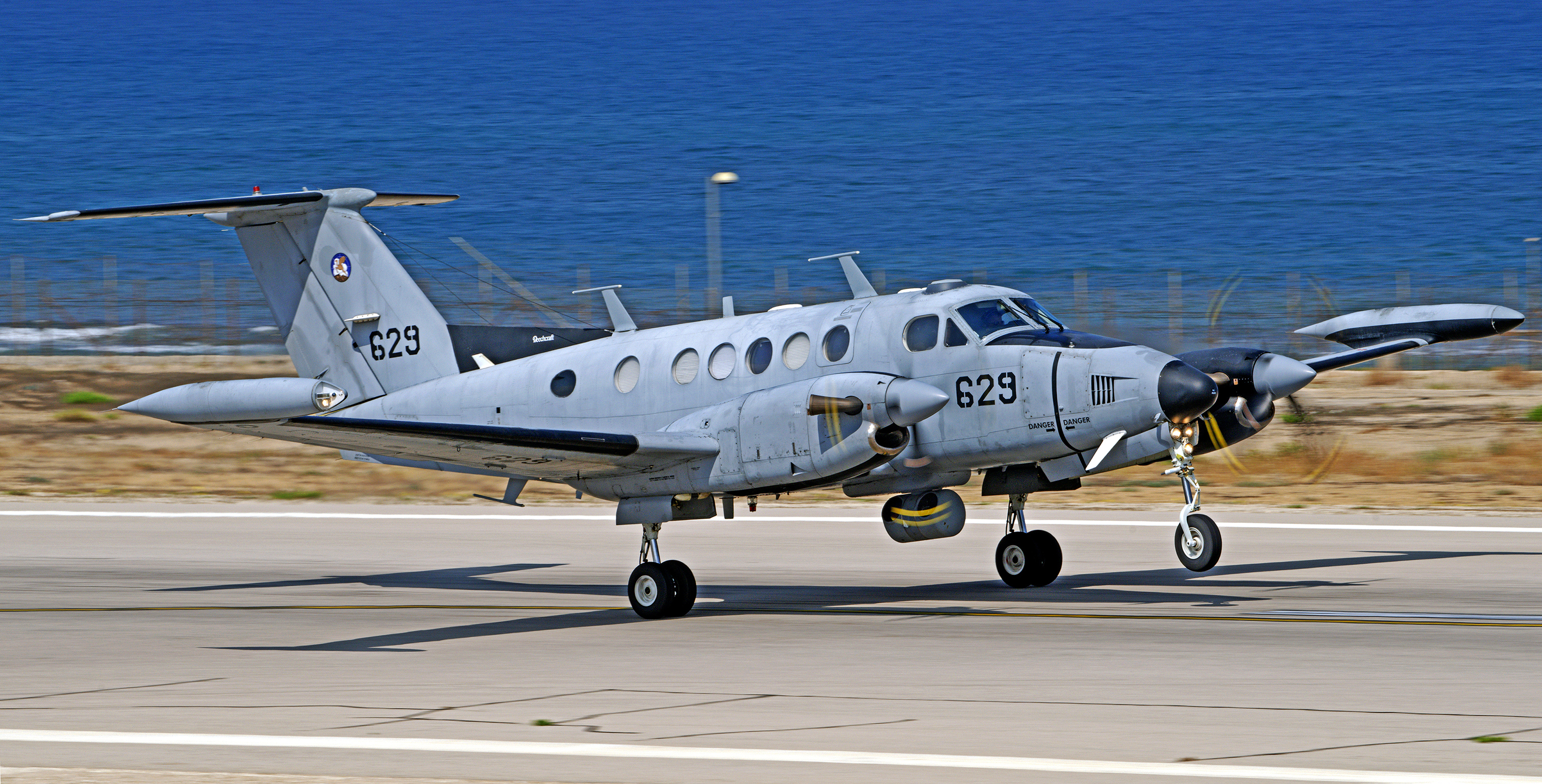
A Beechcraft King Air in 2019 at Sde Dov Airport

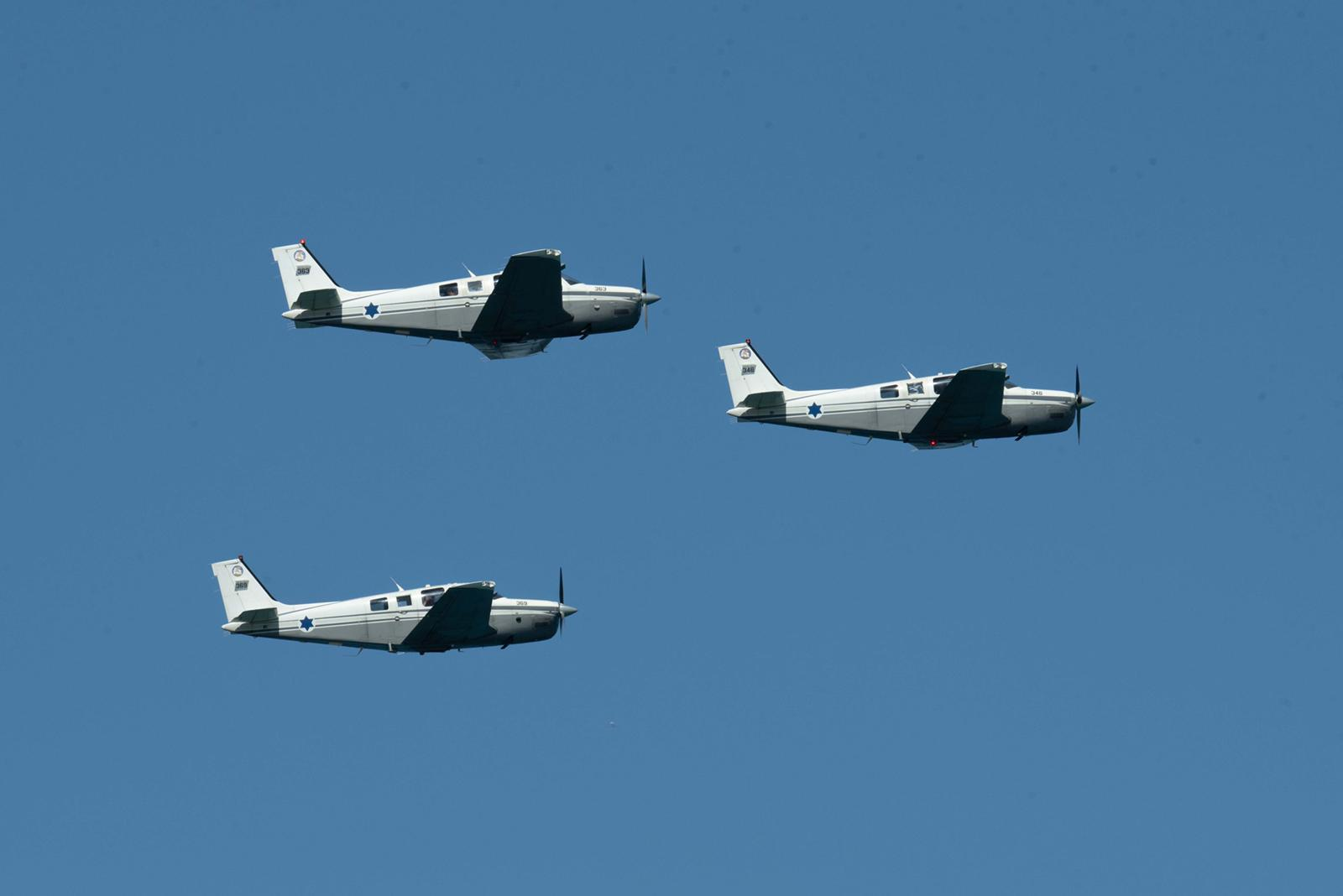
Three Beechcraft Bonanza in 2023

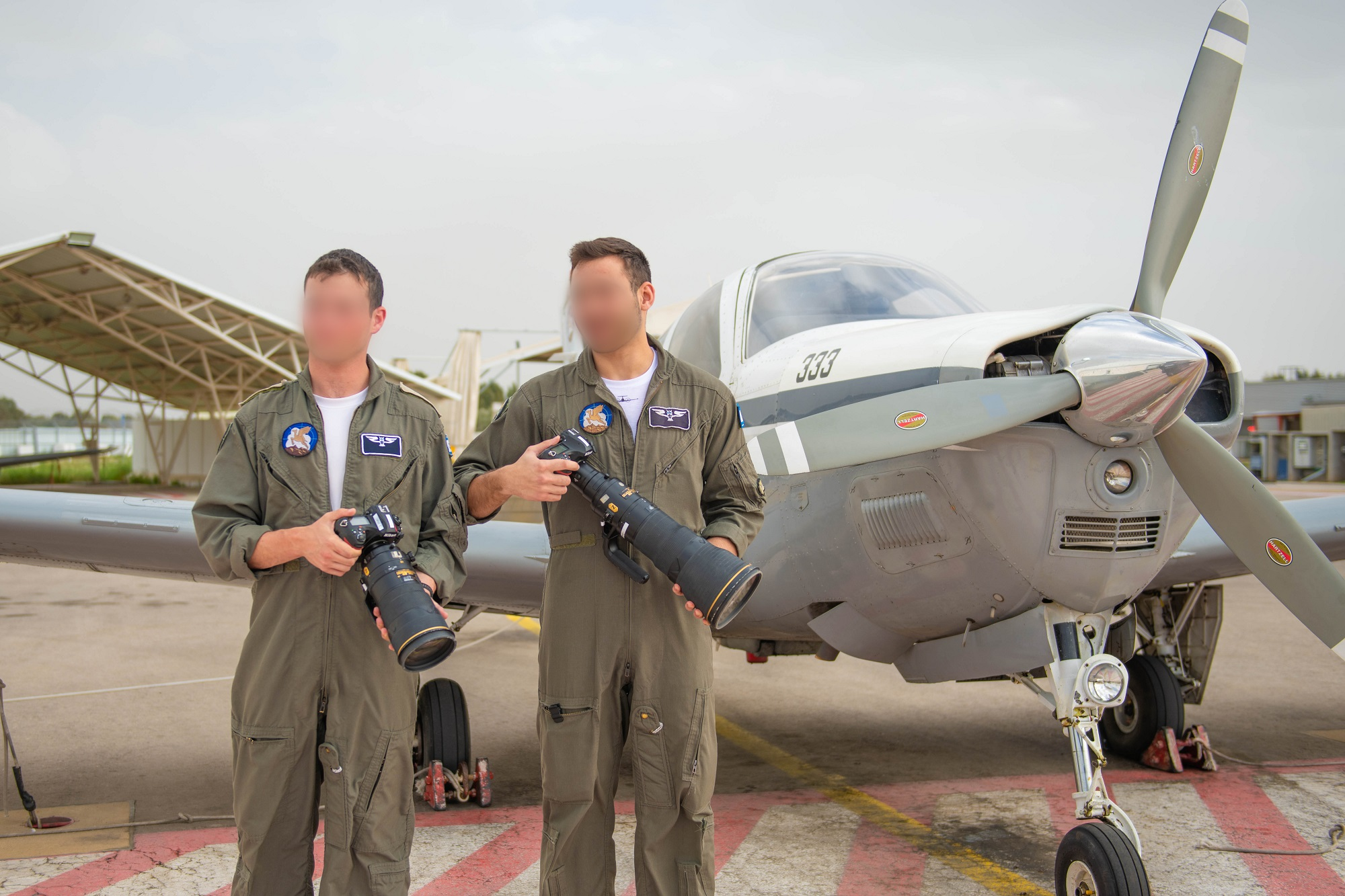
Aerial observers of 100 Squadron in 2023

== See also ==
- Galilee Squadron
