= Yavne'el =

Town in northern Israel

Yavne'el: יַבְנְאֵל; يفنيئيل
- Local council (from 1951)

Hebrew transcription(s)
  - ISO 259: Yabnˀel
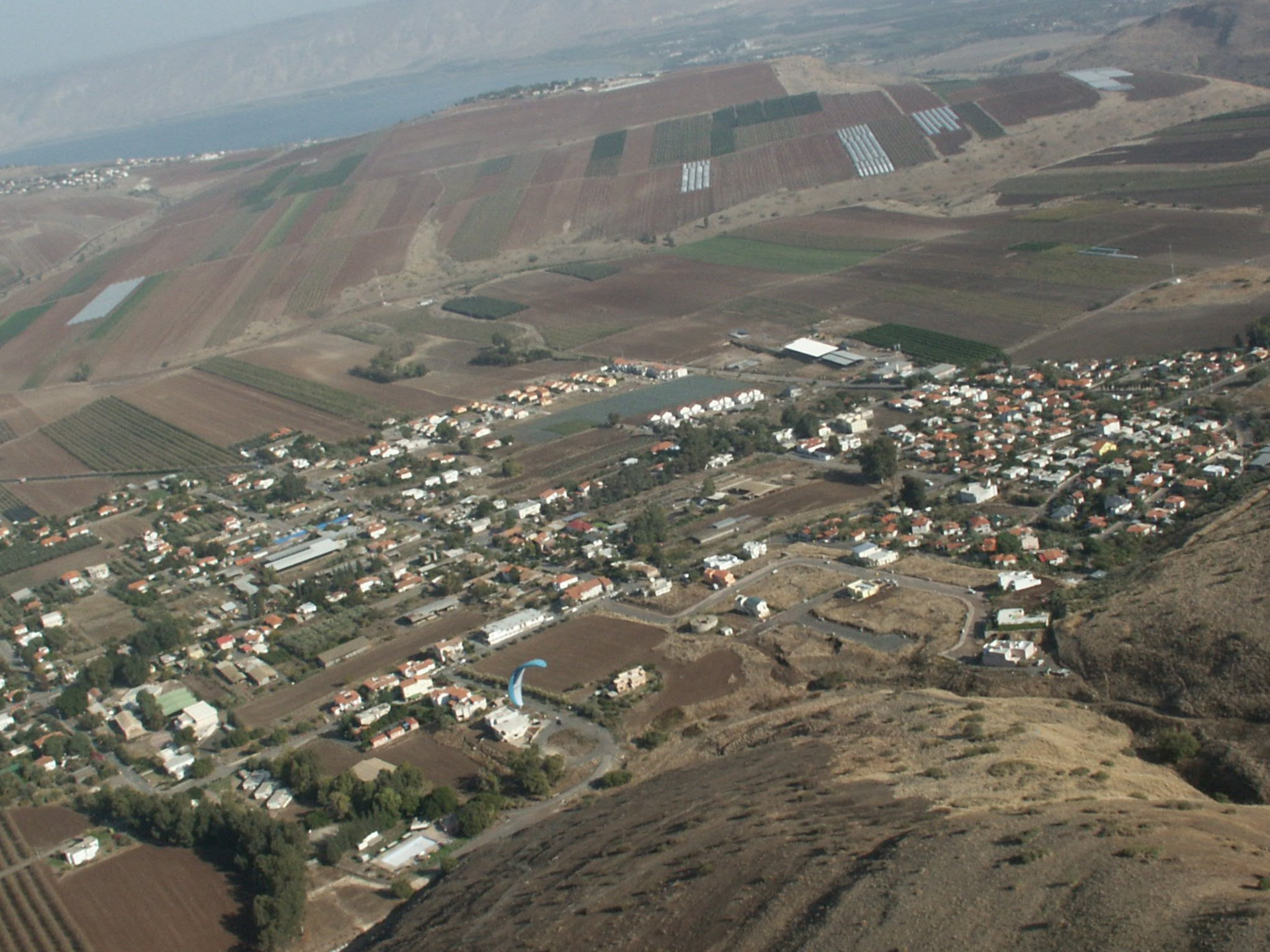
- View of Yavne'el

- Location within Northeast Israel Location within Israel
- Coordinates: 32°42′34″N 35°29′58″E
- Grid position: 197/234 PAL
- Country: Israel
- District: Northern
- Subdistrict: Kinneret
- Natural Region: Eastern Lower Galilee
- Founded: 1901; 125 years ago

Government
  - Head of Municipality: Snir Arish

Area
  - Total: 31,680 dunams (31.68 km^{2}; 12.23 sq mi)

Population (2024)
  - Total: 4,801
  - Density: 151.5/km^{2} (392.5/sq mi)

Yavne'el (Hebrew: יַבְנְאֵל, Arabic: يفنيئيل) is a moshava and local council in the Northern District of Israel. Founded in 1901, it is one of the oldest rural Jewish communities in the country. According to the Israel Central Bureau of Statistics (CBS), in 2024 it had a population of 4,801.

== History ==
=== Archaeology: Bronze Age to Mamluk period ===
Remains from the Late Bronze Age, Iron Age I–II, Persian, Hellenistic, Roman, Late Byzantine, Early Muslim and Mamluk periods have been found here.

At the northwestern edge of Yavne'el is an archaeological tell. Remains include a broken lintel decorated with pomegranates, grapevines, and meander patterns; a frieze carved with a grapevine; a lintel bearing a cross; mosaic floors; fourth-century coinage; and other architectural elements. Zvi Ilan records testimony from a local resident who reported seeing a stone carved with dates, a shofar, and a pomegranate, as well as another stone bearing half of a menorah. Both stones were reused as tombstones and had disappeared by the 1980s. A Greek inscription found at the site mentions a person named Mattathias.

A residential building constructed in the Umayyad period that continued to be inhabited during the Abbasid period (eighth–tenth centuries CE) has been excavated here.

=== Ottoman period ===
==== Arab village ====
During the Ottoman period, the Muslim village in the area was known as Yemma. The village was mentioned in the Ottoman defter for the year 1555-6, located in the Nahiya of Tabariyya of the Liwa of Safad, with its land designated as timar.

A map by Pierre Jacotin from Napoleon's invasion of 1799 noted the place.

In 1875, Victor Guérin visited and described the village as rather ruined and built of basaltic stone, situated in a fertile valley. In 1881, the PEF's Survey of Western Palestine (SWP) described Yemma as having basaltic stone houses, containing 100 Muslims, on an arable plain. There were no gardens or trees, but two springs were nearby, and the village had cisterns. To the south-west of this site there was a supply of water among the rocks of the valley.

==== Jewish settlement ====
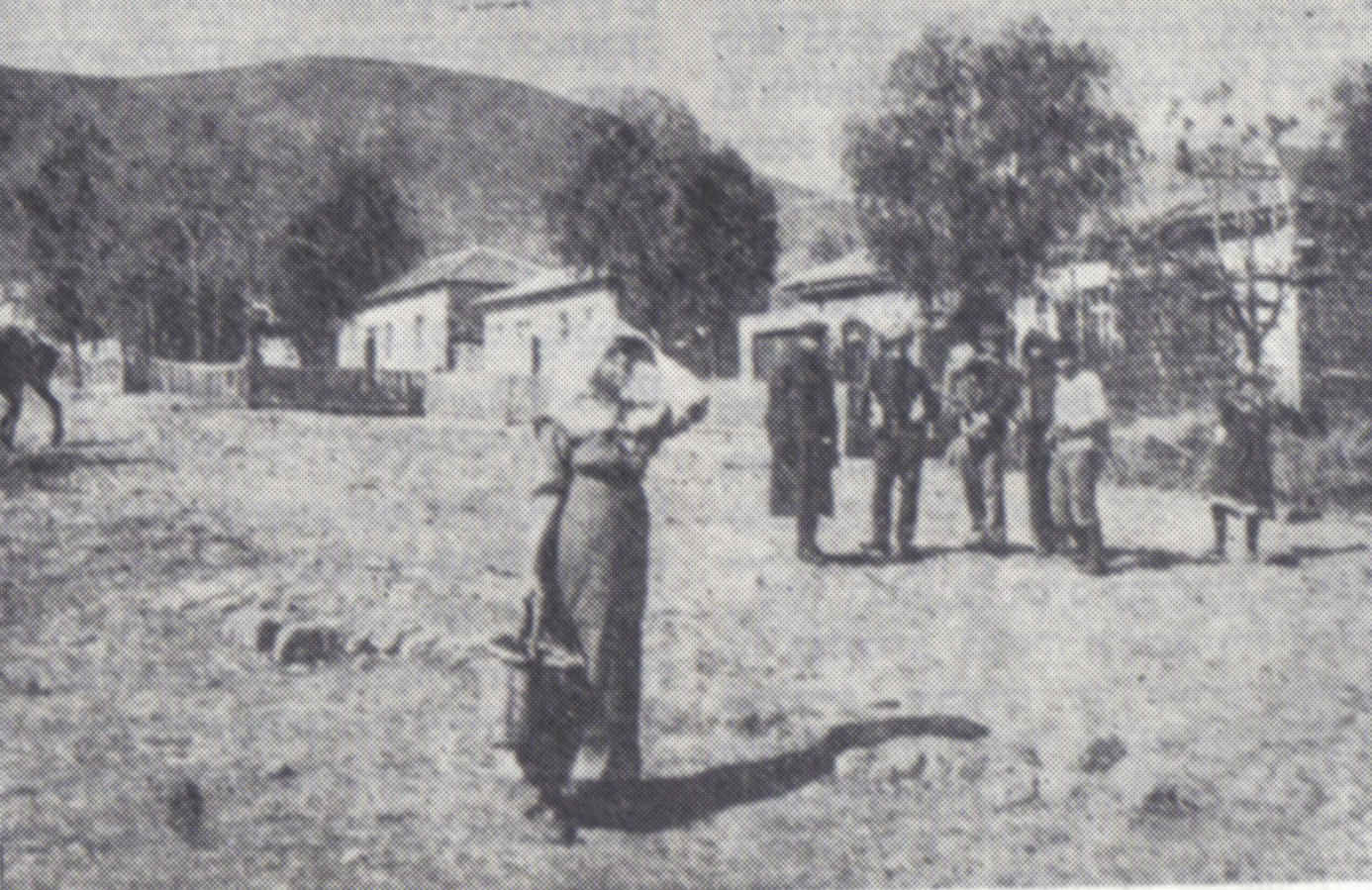
Yavne'el in 1910

The "Yamah" settlement was initially planned for 40 farms, each holding 300 dunams. What is now Yavne'el was established on October 7, 1901, by the Jewish Colonization Association (ICA) on lands bought from the Delaike (Al-Dalaika) Bedouin tribe by Baron Rothschild. The name "Yavne'el" was taken from a biblical city (Joshua 19:33) in the allotment of the tribe of Naphtali, situated in this area. The first settlers came from the Hauran region (Jewish settlers of the Hauran or "Horan" as it was called, had been evicted from there in 1898 by the Ottoman authorities), joined in December 1901 by villagers from Metula. In 1914–15, immigrant families from Yemen settled in Yavne'el.

The new colony of Beit Gan was founded in 1904 as a moshav.

=== British Mandate ===
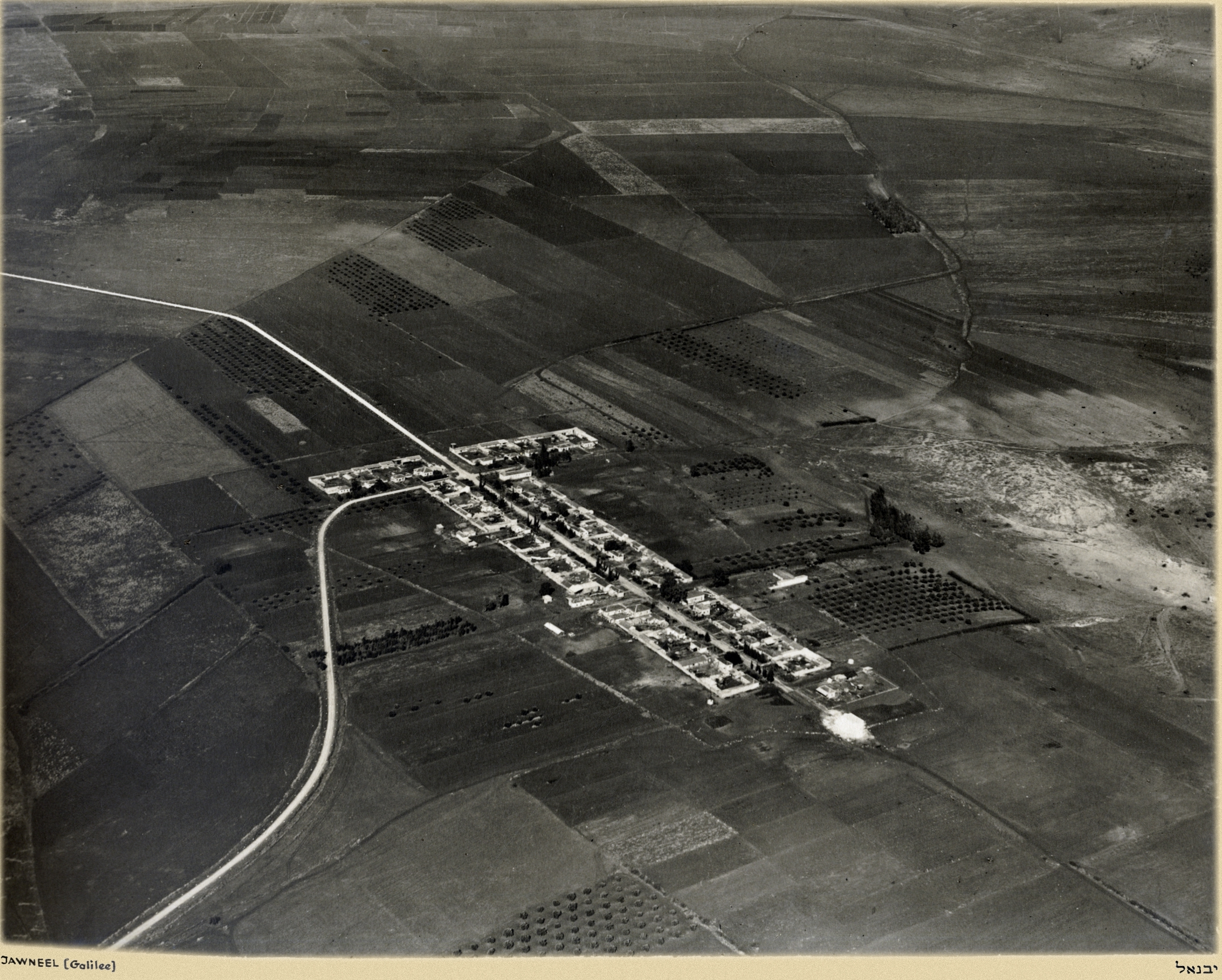
Yavne’el 1937

In the 1922 census of Palestine conducted by the British Mandate authorities, Yabnieh (Yamma) had a total population of 447; 82 Muslims and 365 Jews. At the time of the 1931 census, Yavneel still had exactly the same population of 447; but now it was 56 Muslims and 391 Jews, in a total of 102 houses.

Hitahdut HaMoshavot BeYehuda VeShomron ('Association of moshavot in Judea and Samaria'), the oldest settlement movement for private farmers in the Land of Israel, was founded in Yavne'el in 1920.

When three Jewish residents were murdered by Arab rioters on the road between Yavne'el and Beit Gan in 1937 during the country-wide Arab revolt, a new settlement named in their honour, the moshav Mishmar HaShlosha (lit. 'Guard of the Three'), was established nearby.

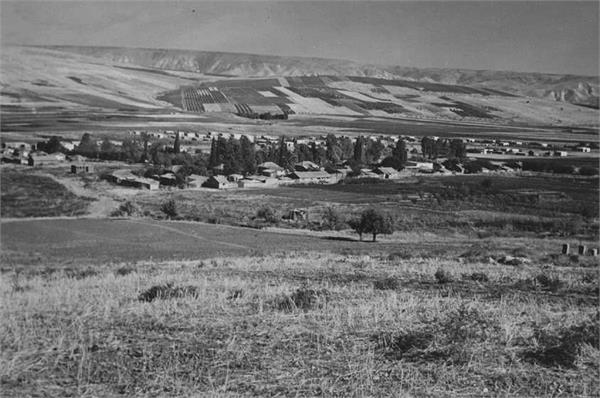
Yavne’el 1947

In the 1945 statistics, Yavneel was home to 590 people, all Jews.

In 1947 an improvised landing strip in the fields of the moshava was used for landing by a transport airplane bringing Jewish refugees, twice from Baghdad and once from Italy. The Galilee Squadron aerial unit was established in Yavne'el and participated in the 1948 Palestine war between April and November 1948, after which it was disbanded.

=== State of Israel ===
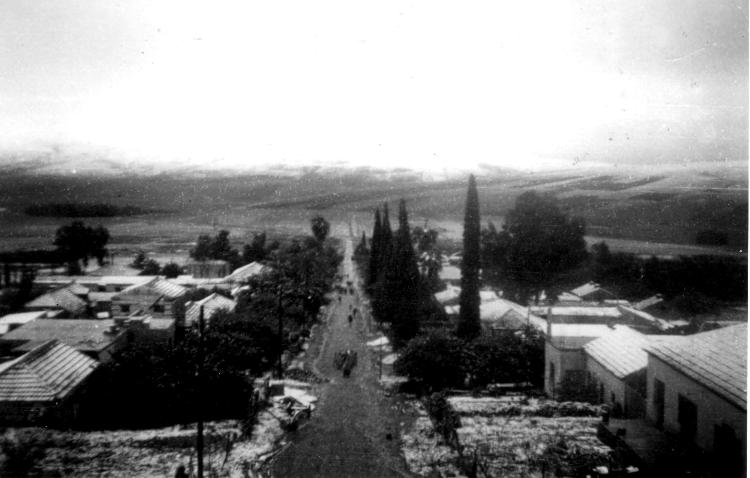
Moshav Yavne’el, 1948

Located southwest of Tiberias, it was declared a local council in 1951.

Several organisations were established in Yavne'el, including the Israeli Farmers Union and the Golani Brigade.

== Administration ==
The local council is jointly responsible for Yavne'el, Beit Gan, Mishmar HaShlosha, and Smadar. The first three were established as moshavot (early Zionist agricultural colonies) and are very close to each other, while Smadar, originally a moshav (communal village with more economic autonomy for the member families than a kibbutz), is slightly farther away.

== Farmer community ==
In 1991, the authors of a book on Jewish identity in contemporary Israel noticed that, although in many ways typical for the processes Israeli society underwent since its inception, Yavne'el has a core group of farmers described as "rooted yeomanry", uncommon outside the few moshavot of the first hour of Zionist settlement that retained their initial rural character - no more than a dozen in the entire country. These farmers are deeply connected to the place, dedicated to working the land, and see themselves as spearheading the tremendously important task of returning the nation to a set of values long lost or ignored by Jews everywhere else, starting with different-minded neighbours from Yavne'el. They are compared to wheat farmers of the American Midwest or Sweden, in the way they both sound and look.

== Breslov community ==
In 1986, Rabbi Eliezer Shlomo Schick founded a Breslov community largely consisting of baalei teshuvah (newly religious) adherents in Yavne'el. As of 2015 this community, which calls itself "Breslov City", numbers nearly 400 families, representing 30 percent of the town's population. The community has its own educational and civic organizations, including a Talmud Torah, girls' school, yeshiva ketana, yeshiva gedola, kollel, beis medrash (study/prayer hall), and charity and humanitarian organizations.

According to statements made in the Knesset by MK Meirav Cohen, by ninth grade 80 percent of the girls in the community were already married. A ninth grade girl would generally be about 14 to 15 years old.

== Demographics ==
Historical population
Year	Pop.	±%
1972	1,400	—
1983	1,600	+14.3%
1995	1,900	+18.8%
2008	3,400	+78.9%
2022	4,557	+34.0%
2024	4,801	+5.4%

== Voting Patterns ==
In the 2026 election, 77 percent of voters in Yavne'el voted for the parties of the right-wing coalition led by Benjamin Netanyahu, while 18 percent voted for the parties of the center-left coalition led by Gadi Eisenkot and 0.4 percent voted for the Arab parties. An additional 2.3 percent voted for the Reservists, and 1.3 percent voted for Amcha Yisrael. 44 percent of voters voted for the Haredi parties Shas or UTJ. Voter turnout increased 15 percent from the 2022 election.

== Notable residents ==
- Ruth Amiran (1914–2005), Israeli archaeologist
- Keren Peles (born 1979), Israeli singer-songwriter and pianist
- Eliezer Shlomo Schick (1940–2015), Hasidic rabbi
- Avraham Yoffe (1913-1983), General in the IDF

== Twin towns – sister cities ==
- Érd, Hungary

== See also ==
- Saham al-Jawlan, village in the Hauran with a short-lived Jewish settlement (1895–96), some of whose colonists, evicted by Ottoman authorities, became the founders of Yavne'el

== Bibliography ==
- Barron, J. B., ed. (1923). Palestine: Report and General Abstracts of the Census of 1922. Government of Palestine.
- van den Brink, Edwin C.M. (December 4, 2017). "Yavne'el, Tel Yin'am". Hadashot Arkheologiyot – Excavations and Surveys in Israel (129).
- Conder, C.R.; Kitchener, H.H. (1881). The Survey of Western Palestine: Memoirs of the Topography, Orography, Hydrography, and Archaeology. Vol. 1. London: Committee of the Palestine Exploration Fund.
- Dalali-Amos, Edna (August 16, 2011a). "Yavne'el". Hadashot Arkheologiyot – Excavations and Surveys in Israel (123).
- Dalali-Amos, Edna (December 19, 2011b). "Yavne'el, Bet Gan". Hadashot Arkheologiyot – Excavations and Surveys in Israel (123).
- Department of Statistics (1945). Village Statistics, April, 1945. Government of Palestine.
- Guérin, V. (1880). Description Géographique Historique et Archéologique de la Palestine (in French). Vol. 3: Galilee, pt. 1. Paris: L'Imprimerie Nationale.
- Hadawi, S. (1970). Village Statistics of 1945: A Classification of Land and Area ownership in Palestine. Palestine Liberation Organization Research Centre.
- Hanna, Butros (September 30, 2009). "Yavne'el". Hadashot Arkheologiyot – Excavations and Surveys in Israel (121).
- Hanna, Butros (August 29, 2017). "Yavne'el". Hadashot Arkheologiyot – Excavations and Surveys in Israel (129).
- Karmon, Y. (1960). "An Analysis of Jacotin's Map of Palestine" (PDF). Israel Exploration Journal. 10 (3–4): 155–173, 244–253. Archived from the original (PDF) on 2018-09-05.
- Liebowitz, Harold (1995). "Khirbet Beit Jann – 1992". Hadashot Arkheologiyot – Excavations and Surveys in Israel (HA-ESI). 14. Israel Antiquities Authority.
- Mills, E., ed. (1932). Census of Palestine 1931. Population of Villages, Towns and Administrative Areas. Jerusalem: Government of Palestine.
- Palmer, E.H. (1881). The Survey of Western Palestine: Arabic and English Name Lists Collected During the Survey by Lieutenants Conder and Kitchener, R. E. Transliterated and Explained by E.H. Palmer. Committee of the Palestine Exploration Fund.
- Rhode, H. (1979). Administration and Population of the Sancak of Safed in the Sixteenth Century. Columbia University. Archived from the original on 2020-03-01 – via www.academia.edu.
- Ilan, Zvi (1987). Synagogues in Galilee and Golan (in Hebrew). Jerusalem: Ariel. p. 63.
