= Maamor =

Maamor or ma'amar (Hebrew, plural: Ma'amarim (masculine); Ma'amaros (feminine)) is derived from the Hebrew word to 'speak/pronounce/express/say'. It literally means an 'expression/statement/enunciation', or in a broader sense 'teaching/lesson/discourse'. It is sometimes used in traditional Judaism for a printed study of Torah teachings.

Among particular connotations are:

- Pirkei Avot (Mishnaic, 'Ethics of the Fathers') states that God created the world with asarah ma'amaros meaning ten of His "expressions", or commands, interpreted in Kabbalah as the 10 Sefirot.
- Maamarim (Chabad) is the term used in the Chabad Hasidic dynasty for the central mystical "discourses" in Hasidic thought of each of its 7 leaders.
- In the Yeshiva Rabbi Chaim Berlin it refers to a type of public lecture combining a variety of schools of rabbinic thought by Rabbi Yitzchok Hutner.
