= Tikunei haZohar =

Zohar imitation

Tikunei haZohar (Hebrew: תִּקּוּני הזהר, romanized: ˌTiqqunˈē haz-ˈZohar, lit. 'Repairs of the Zohar'), also known as the Tikunim (תקונים), is a main text of the Kabbalah that was composed in the 14th century. It is a separate appendix to the Zohar, a crucial 13th-century work of Kabbalah, consisting of seventy commentaries on the opening word of the Torah, In the beginning, in the Midrashic style. The theme of Tikunei haZohar is to repair and support the Shekhinah or Malkuth — hence its name, "Repairs of the Zohar" — and to bring on the Redemption and conclude the Exile.

Tikunei haZohar was first printed in Mantua in 1558, followed by Constantinople editions in 1719 and 1740. Modern citations generally follow the 1740 pagination.

== Language and authorship ==
Zoharic Aramaic is an artificial dialect largely based on a linguistic fusion of the Jewish Babylonian Aramaic of the Babylonian Talmud and the formalised Jewish Palestinian Aramaic of the Targum Onkelos, but confused by imperfect grammar, limited vocabulary, and loanwords from contemporary medieval languages.

Tikunei haZohar claims to have been composed by the tanna Shimon bar Yochai and his son Eleazar ben Simeon. It was composed by a 14th-century Kabbalist imitating the style of the Zohar. It contains some additions from later Kabbalists. For example, Shalom Buzaglo, in his commentary Kisse Melekh p. 1a, explains an exclamation in the text that was inserted by Isaac Luria (see below).

Jerusalem kabbalist Daniel Frisch (1935–2005) published a Hebrew translation of and commentary on Tikunei haZohar and the Zohar itself called Matok miDvash (מתוק מדבש). It is written in vernacular Medieval Hebrew and reinterprets the Zohar according to Lurianic Kabbalah.

David Solomon's bilingual annotated English translation, called the Tiqqunei ha-Zohar Margalya, is planned to be published by Margalya Press As of 2024. Solomon has translated the full text of the definitive 1740 Constantinople edition in parallel, line-by-line poetic form.

== Structure, Composition, and Topics ==
There are two introductions. The first introduction, pages 1a-16b, tells how the book developed after Shimon bar Yohai and his son fled from the Romans and hid in a cave; describes the ten sefirot according to their colors; tells the loftiness of the tzadikim; gives some explanations of the seventy tikkunim; and also tells eleven additional tikkunim.

The intro discusses more concepts regarding the book, interspersed with prayers.

The second introduction, pages 17a-17b, contains a similar account of flight to the cave etc., followed by Patach Eliyahu. Petaḥ Eliyahu is Eliyahu's meditative prayer which contains foundations of Kabbalah, namely, that Hashem is one and indivisible, Creator of all, beyond comprehension, but Who reveals Himself to us by the Torah and the Kabbalah and conducts the world by orders such as the ten Sefirot, which correspond to the human form—though He Himself has no body or form. Eliyahu concludes his prayer, saying to Shimon, "Arise, Rabbi Shimon, and let words of novellae be revealed by you, for behold, you have permission to reveal hidden secrets, through you; such permission to reveal has not been given to any human until now." Petaḥ Eliyahu is found in the daily liturgy of Sephardic Jews, and in the daily or weekly liturgy of various Hasidic groups.

== Commentaries ==
There are several explanations and commentaries on Tikunei haZohar. The more noted ones include: Or Yakar by Moses ben Jacob Cordovero, Kisse Melekh by Shalom Buzaglo, Or Yisrael by Yisroel Hopstein, Biurei haGra on Tikunei Zohar (Vilna, Jewish year 5627), Chemdat Tzvi by Tzvi Hirsh of Zidichov, Be'er Yitzchak by Yitzchak Aizik of Polotsk, Be'er Lechai Ro'i by Tzvi Hirsh Shapira of Munkatch/Dinov [Dynow], Kegan haYarak by Kalfa Guedj, Netzutzei Zohar by Rav Reuven Margoliot, Metok Medvash by David Meir Frisch, and the Sulam by Yehuda Ashlag.

== Customs and influences ==
There is a custom among some Jews to study Tikunei haZohar especially in the month of Elul, and also during the Ten Days of Repentance, since according to the kabbalists (including the Arizal) and many chasidic books, Tikunei haZohar repairs a person's spirit and cleanses his body and soul; therefore according to tradition, during these days which are called yemei teshuvah (days of repentance or drawing close to God), the repair of deeds is much greater. In some printed versions there is a partitioning of Tikunei haZohar over the forty days from the eve of Rosh Chodesh Elul to Yom Kippur, but this partitioning is not obligatory. In Chasidic communities (and others, more recently) it has been customary to publicize a list of praises of this custom and to distribute it and/or the book on the eve of Rosh Chodesh Elul

One particular influence of Tikunei haZohar is that Tikkun #21 is referenced in Likutei Moharan II #8 and other works of Nachman of Breslov in discussing "the song that will be awakened in the future" at the time of the ultimate Redemption and end of the exile: the "simple, double, triple and quadruple song ... Y YK YKW YKWK (K has been substituted for H to guard the sanctity of the Tetragrammaton)." Israel Dov Odesser and Na Nachs have understood the name and the song Na Nach Nachma Nachman (MeUman) as an aspect of this song.
