= Moshe Breslover =

Moshe Breslover was the nickname given to Rabbi Moshe Lubarski (c. 1825 – 1890?), one of the closest disciples of Nathan of Breslov ("Reb Noson"), who in turn was the closest disciple of Rebbe Nachman of Breslov. After Reb Noson's death in 1844, Lubarski became a leading figure in the Breslover community and taught many people, including Rabbi Shimshon Barski and Rabbi Yisroel Halpern.

== Biography ==
According to Breslover tradition, Lubarski and his brother, Reb Zanvil, were born as a result of a blessing that Reb Noson gave to their childless mother. She and her husband took care of one of the mikvahs in the town of Breslov, Ukraine. They often provided warm water and towels for Reb Noson to use each night when he arose for Tikkun Chatzot (the Midnight Lament). During the 1830s, when opposition against Reb Noson flared in the town of Breslov, Reb Noson's opponents tried to stop the caretakers from assisting him. They refused, which led to a boycott of their mikvah and resultant financial loss. Lubarski's mother appealed for relief to Reb Noson. Unable to help her with money, Reb Noson offered her a blessing instead. When he heard that she and her husband were childless, he blessed them with children. Reb Moshe and Reb Zanvil were born thereafter.

Lubarski's faith in his mentor was so strong that he followed Reb Noson's guidance and teachings in all cases. Once his house was robbed, but instead of going out to find the thief, he repaired to the study hall, opened a copy of Reb Noson's Likutey Halachot, and began to study the laws and discourses on stealing. Soon afterward, his possessions were returned to him.

Lubarski settled in Tcherin, a small town in eastern Ukraine, after his marriage, where he conversed daily with Reb Avraham Ber, the grandson of Rebbe Nachman and a follower of Reb Noson. Once, Reb Avraham Ber's father-in-law asked to speak with Lubarski as well. Awestruck, Lubarski protested, "What can I say to you about serving God? You knew the Rebbe!" Reb Avraham Ber's father-in-law replied, "Believe me, you learned more about Rebbe Nachman through Reb Noson than I know even from Rebbe Nachman himself!"

== See also ==
- Breslov (Hasidic dynasty)
- Nathan of Breslov
