= Na Nach Nachma Nachman Meuman =

Hasidic formula phrase

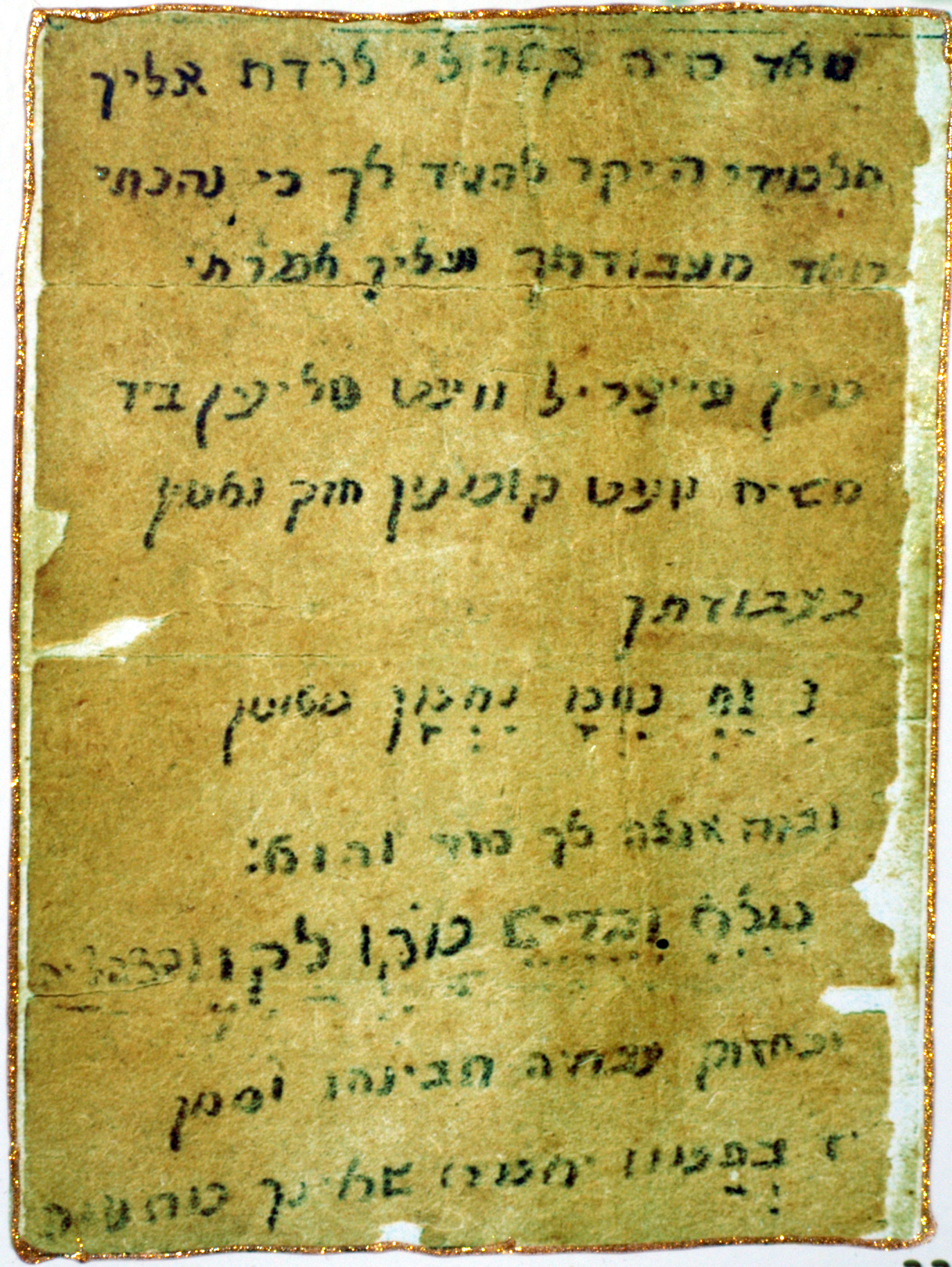
A reproduction of the petek.

Na Nach Nachma Nachman Me'uman (Hebrew: נַ נַחְ נַחְמָ נַחְמָן מֵאוּמַן) is a Hebrew language name and song used by a subgroup of Breslover Hasidim colloquially known as the Na Nachs. It is a kabbalistic formula based on the four Hebrew letters of the name Nachman, referring to the founder of the Breslov movement, Rebbe Nachman of Breslov, along with a reference to his burial place in Uman, Ukraine.

In 1922, Rabbi Yisroel Ber Odesser, a Breslover Hasid, claimed to have received a petek (note) addressed to him from Rebbe Nachman, although the latter had died in 1810. The seventh line of this petek is signed Na Nach Nachma Nachman Meuman, which became Rabbi Odesser's personal meditation and song. Before he died, he taught this phrase to a group of devotees who formed the Na Nach movement.

== History of the phrase ==
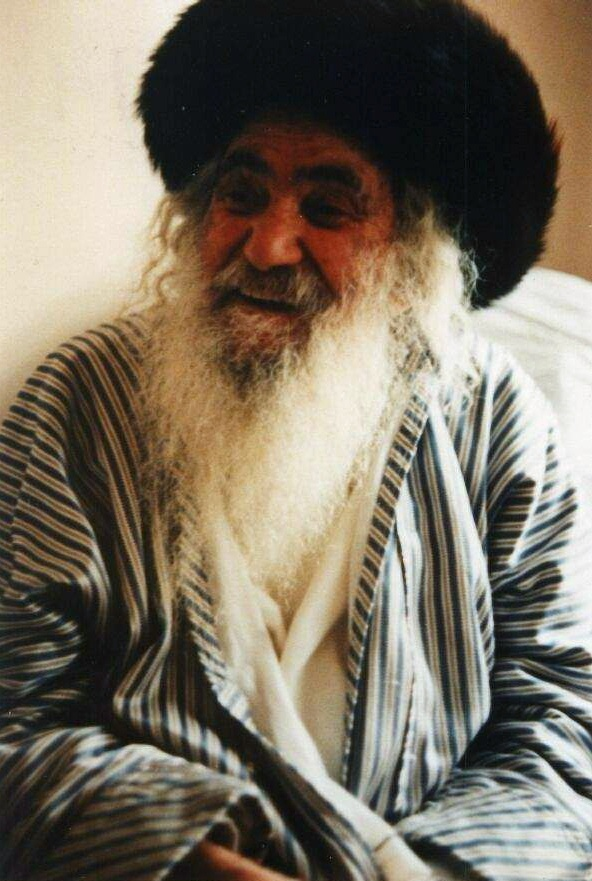
Rabbi Yisroel Ber Odesser, teacher of the Na Nach Nachma Nachman phrase.

The Na Nach Nachma phrase was allegedly revealed to and taught by Rabbi Yisroel Ber Odesser, a Breslov hasid who was born in 1888 in Tiberias. Rabbi Israel was among the first Breslover Hasidim in Israel, having learned about the movement from Rabbi Yisroel Halpern when he was a young yeshiva student.

Ber Odesser's followers claim that, when he was 34 years old, Odesser was overcome with weakness and hunger on the Fast of Tammuz. He decided to eat. But immediately after eating, he felt great sorrow at having succumbed to his own physical temptations. After five continuous days of prayer, a powerful thought came to him: "Go into your room!" He obeyed the inner voice, went to his personal locked bookcase (to which only he had the key) which he kept locked due to opposition to Breslov prevalent at that time, and randomly opened a book. In the book was a piece of paper that he would later call "The Letter from Heaven." The paper, written in Hebrew, with one line in Yiddish, is translated as follows:

English	Hebrew and Yiddish
It was very difficult for me to come down to you	מאוד היה קשה לי לרדת אליך
my precious student to tell you that I had pleasure	תלמידי היקר, להגיד לך כי נהנתי
very much from your devotion and upon you I said	מאוד מעבודתך, ועליך אמרתי
my fire will burn until	מיין פייערל וועט טליען ביז
the Messiah will come, strong and courageous	משיח וועט קומען חזק ואמץ
in your devotion	בעבודתך
Na Nach Nachma Nachman Meuman	נ נח נחמ נחמן מאומן
And with this I will reveal to you a secret and it is:	:ובזה אגלה לך סוד והוא
Full and heaped up from one extreme to another extreme (PTzPTzYH)	מלא וגדיש מקו לקו (פצפציה)
And with the strengthening of your devotion you will understand it and a sign	ובחיזוק עבודה תבינהו וסמן
The 17th of Tammuz they will say that you don't fast	יז בתמוז יאמרו שאינך מתענה

Odesser believed the letter to be a message of consolation, above other marvellous things inside, directly from Rebbe Nachman's spirit to himself here on earth. Since his name did not appear in the petek as the recipient, Odesser said that this was reason for every person to consider the petek addressed to himself or herself personally. Odesser adopted Na Nach Nachma Nachman Meuman as his personal meditation and song, and became so totally identified with it that he later said, "I am Na Nach Nachma Nachman Me'Uman!" (This quote appears on Odesser's tombstone in Jerusalem.)

== Authenticity of the petek ==
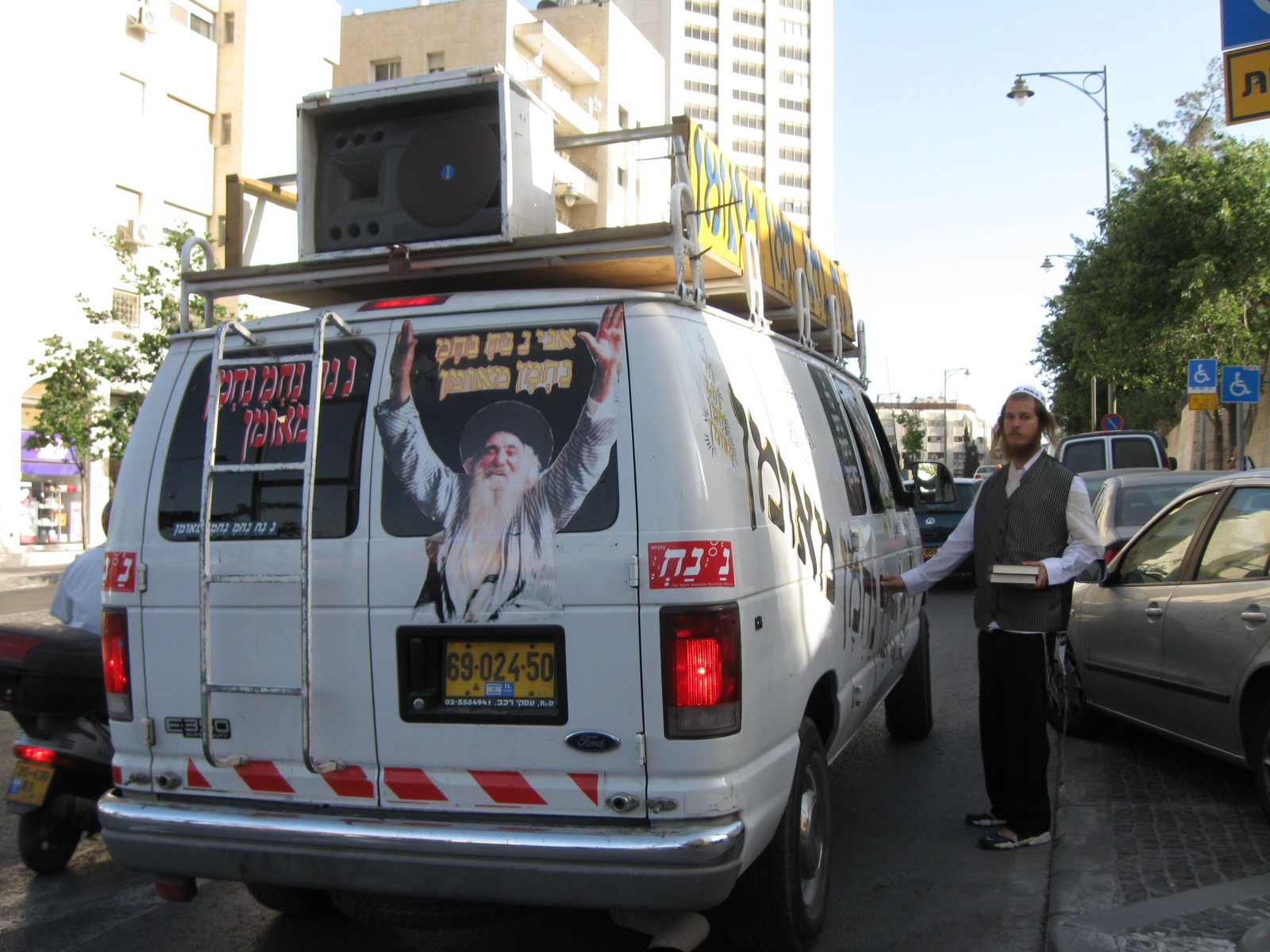
A Na-Nach Breslover Hasid stands beside a van emblazoned with images of Rabbi Yisroel Ber Odesser and the "Na Nach Nachma Nachman Meuman" phrase in downtown Jerusalem.

Some Breslover Hasidim, especially prevalent among followers of competing charismatic leaders, do not use Na Nach Nachma (some groups actually oppose it). Some deny its authenticity. The following are some of the diverse opinions:

- Rabbi Odesser believed the "Letter from Heaven" was a genuine miracle, pointing out that the bookcase where the petek (note) appeared was locked at the time, and he had the only key. His followers believed in the miracle also. They continue to this day to chant the phrase as a "Song of Redemption" for the freedom from sin and restoration of the world. Odesser's personal account of how he found the Letter has been translated into English under the title The Letter from Heaven: Rebbe Nachman's Song.
- Some believe that the letter was a note written to someone by Rebbe Nachman when he visited Tiberias during his pilgrimage to Israel in the early 19th century. Somehow it was placed in the old book, but Odesser's finding it was a coincidence (or miracle of timing), as was the reference to someone eating on the Fast of Tammuz.
- Still others believe it was a well-intentioned forgery, written by one of Rabbi Odesser's fellow students in order to cheer him up after he became depressed from breaking his fast.

Although Na Nach Nachma is based on the name of Rebbe Nachman, it was unknown in his day. However, he did say that repeating one word over and over was an effective form of meditation (Likutei Moharan Tinyana #96). His own personal phrase was Ribono shel Olam (Master of the Universe) which he pronounced with the Yiddish intonation as: Ree-BOY-noy shell OY-lahm. Many Breslover Hasidim today still prefer this phrase, although it refers to God, not the Zaddik.

== Pronunciation and meaning of the phrase ==
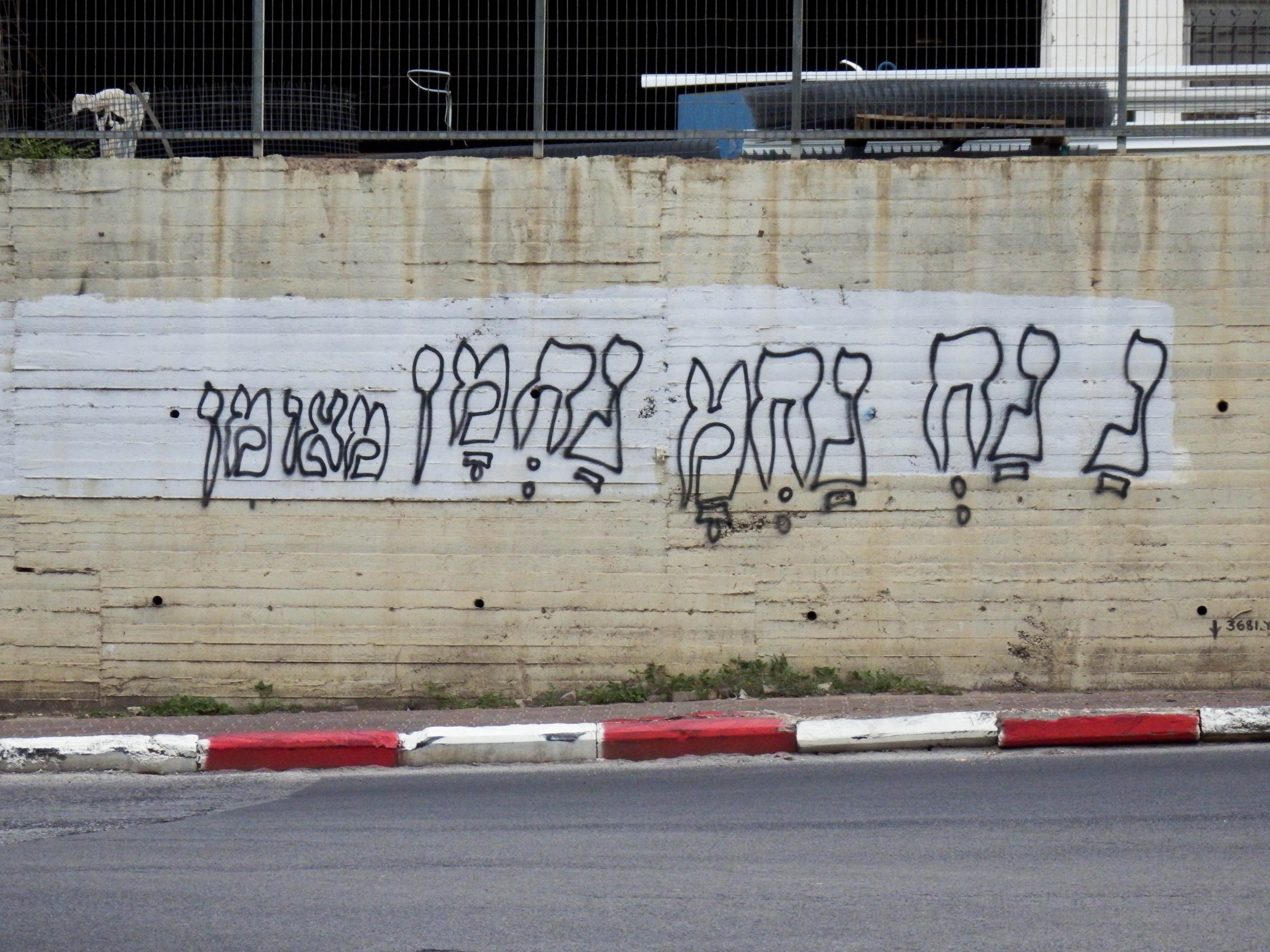
Vowelized Na Nach graffiti on Yehuda Halevi street in Tiberias.

During his lifetime, Rebbe Nachman spoke of a "Song of Redemption" that would be revealed before the coming of the Jewish Messiah. This song would be in a "single, double, triple, quadruple" form. (Likutei Moharan II, #8). Another possible explanation for this phrase is that the Talmud states in Tractate Pesachim that if one wants to rid himself of a certain demon that inflicts water he should say שברירי ברירי רירי ירי רי thereby diminishing the effects of the demon. Just as we see that saying phrases with diminishing letters can diminish the effects of something impure, so to saying and adding to the name of a righteous person can exemplify him to the greatest high. Na Nach Nachma phrase has such a structure (keeping in mind that Hebrew often omits the vowels) and is based on the Rebbe's name, "Nachman":

- Na (One Hebrew letter: Nun) — נ
- NaCH (Two Hebrew letters: Nun-Chet) — נח
- NaCHMa (Three Hebrew letters: Nun-Chet-Mem) — נחמ
- NaCHMaN (Four Hebrew letters: Nun-Chet-Mem-Nun) — נחמן
- Me'Uman (a pun: it can mean "from Uman", Rebbe Nachman's burial place, and can also mean "believed" or "accredited".) — מאומן

The phrase is pronounced with a soft A sound as in "ah" and a guttural KH sound as in German "ach." It is usually accented as follows:

Nah-nakh-nakhmah-nakhman-meh-oo-mahn.

Speakers of Yiddish have also noted that na nach can mean "now to," which would loosely translate the phrase as "Now to Nachman from Uman," that is, traveling to the Rebbe on pilgrimage to his gravesite or in one's heart.

== Popularity of the phrase today ==
Whatever the origins of this phrase, it is now very popular among a subgroup of Breslover Hasidim who follow Rabbi Odesser, who are colloquially known as the Na Nachs. The name has been incorporated into both traditional and contemporary Jewish music, appeared on bumper stickers, billboards and public graffiti throughout Israel, and is used on jewellery and amulets. Among some groups of Sephardic Jewish youth in Israel, it has become a sort of rallying cry for returning to traditional Judaism, although not necessarily to mainstream Breslov.

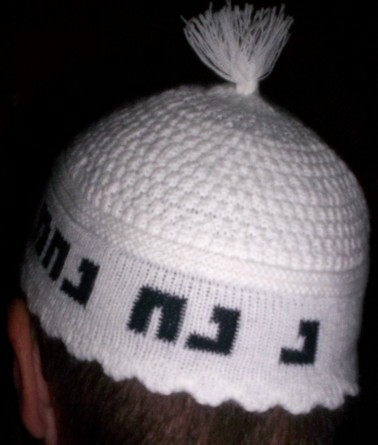
Typical white "Na Nacher" style yarmulke with the phrase woven into it, made in Jerusalem in 2005

More recently, some people have begun to wear the words of the phrase crocheted on large, white yarmulkes with a little tassel on top. (These hats are a modification of a traditional white yarmulke that has been worn in Jerusalem for centuries. That style, in turn, apparently evolved from the medieval Jewish hat with the ball on top—hence the tassel.) When Rabbi Odesser was still alive, some of his followers were already wearing large white yarmulkes, but without the phrase on them. Today, the Na Nachs make this crocheted yarmulke part of their uniform attire. Na Nach Nachma Nachman Meuman yarmulkes in other colors are also appearing on the market and are a popular item for Purim.

== Bibliography ==
The following books were written on the petek and the meaning of its words:

- Matzpon Hapetek ("The Compass of the Petek"), by Amos Levi. This book divides the 6,000 years of the world by the 51 words of the petek, allocating 120 years to each word, analyzing history and the future based on the corresponding word and letters in the petek. E.g. the first word of the petek, Meod (very) corresponds to the first 120 years of the world. Thus the Hebrew letters of the word Meod, מאד, can be rearranged to spell Adam, אדם, the first person to live in those years. (Note: ם is the form the letter מ takes at the end of a word; Hebrew is written from right to left.)
- Seventy Rectifications of the Petek
- Zeh Yinachamainu ("This Will Comfort Us"), by Rabbi Yitzhak Besancon. An in-depth study of every word and letter of the petek.

== Sources ==
- The Letter from Heaven: Rebbe Nachman's Song. an account of Rabbi Odesser's life and the story of the Na Nach Nachma, published by Netzach Yisroel Press, Israel, 1991, 1995.
- Young Buds of the Stream, letters to Zalman Shazar from Rabbi Odesser, English edition published by Netzach Yisroel Press, Israel 1995. Pages 37–43 contain a detailed explanation of the meaning of the phrase.
- Outpouring of the Soul, translated by Aryeh Kaplan. (Compilation of Nachman of Breslov's quotes on meditation and prayer). Breslov Research Institute, 1980.
