= Kippah =

Skullcap traditionally worn by Jewish men

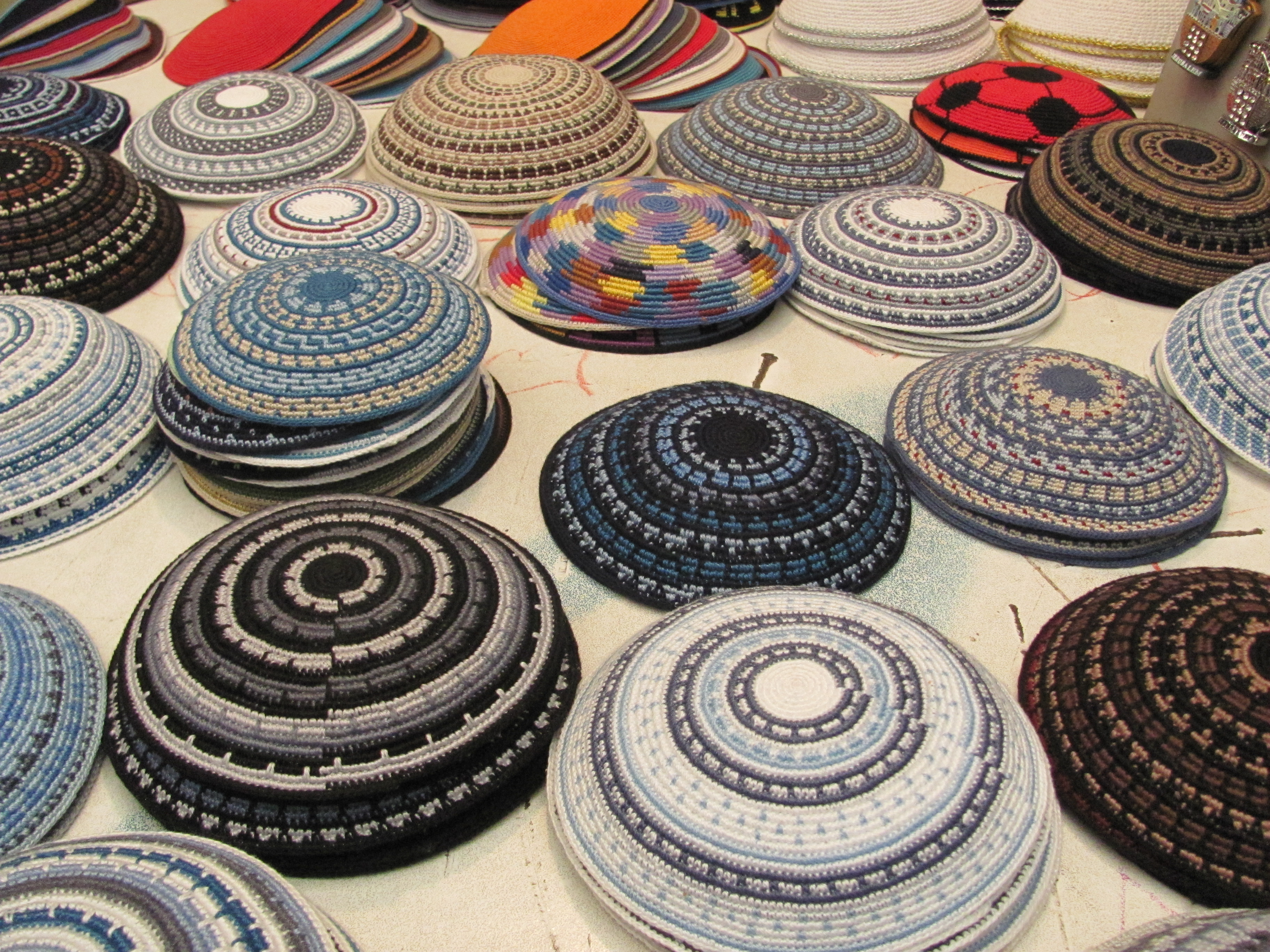
Crocheted kippot for sale in Jerusalem

A kippah (Note: Pronunciation: /kiːˈpɑː/; Hebrew: כִּיפָּה, romanized: kīppā, plural כִּיפּוֹת kīppōt) (pl. kippot), yarmulke, (Note: Pronunciation: /ˈjɑːrməlkə/, also US: /ˈjɑːməkə/; Yiddish: יאַרמלקע, yarmlke or יאַרמולקע, yarmulke; German: Jarmulke; Polish: Jarmułka) or koppel (Note: Yiddish: קאפל kapl; Polish: koppel) is a brimless Jewish skullcap, usually made of cloth, traditionally worn by Jewish men and sometimes women to fulfill the customary requirement that the head should be covered. It is the most common type of head-covering worn by men in Jewish communities during prayers and by most Orthodox Jewish men at most other times. Among non-Orthodox Jewish individuals, some wear them at most times, while most wear them only during prayer, while attending a synagogue, or at other ceremonies, and others wear them rarely or never.

The Hebrew word means "dome". The Yiddish yarmlke probably derives from the Polish jarmułka or Ukrainian yarmulka, and is popularly connected with the Aramaic phrase yire malka, "fear of the king". Little is said about covering the head in the Hebrew Bible beyond the turban worn by the priests in the Temple, and the Talmud presents regular covering as the practice of the particularly pious rather than a general obligation. Later authorities disagreed about whether it is required. The Shulchan Aruch rules that a man should not walk four cubits bareheaded, while Maimonides required a covering only during prayer and the Vilna Gaon held that a blessing may be recited without one.

Practice varies by movement. Orthodox boys are encouraged to wear a kippah from a young age, and most Orthodox men wear one at all times.

== Etymology ==
The term kippah (Hebrew: כיפה) literally means "dome" as the kippah is worn on the head like a dome.

The Yiddish term yarmlke (Yiddish: יאַרמלקע) might be derived from the Polish jarmułka or the Ukrainian yarmulka and perhaps ultimately from the Medieval Latin almutia ("cowl" or "hood"). The word is often associated with the phrase ירא מלכא (yire malka), formed from the Aramaic word for "king" and the Hebrew root ירא, meaning "fear".

Another Yiddish term for this garment is keppel or koppel.

== Laws and history ==
In the Hebrew Bible, very little is said about head coverage, besides the Cohanim (priests) who were obligated to wear a turban or hat as part of their Temple service. The Israelites most probably wore a headdress similar to that worn by the Bedouin. Later on, they likely adopted a turban-like headdress more like that of the fellahin, in which a cloth is wrapped around a cap placed on the head, as suggested by Ezekiel 16:10. Yemenite Jews, in later generations, called the wrap around the cap a מַצַר, matzar.

In later centuries, there are testimonies in the Talmud that only the extremely zealous covered their heads regularly, as a sign of respect for God. For example, Rabbi Huna ben Joshua never walked four cubits (6.6 feet or 2.0 metres) with his head uncovered, saying "because the Divine Presence is always over my head." However, such behavior was exceptional, and Jewish artwork of the Hellenistic period largely shows men with uncovered heads. In one place, the Talmud prescribes a blessing to be said upon "spreading a shawl upon [one's] head" in the morning; such covering seems to have been the practice of Torah scholars, or of married men. This practice may have been related to the Roman pileus (worn mainly by commoners and freed slaves); by covering the head, one symbolizes that he is a slave to God.

Later Halachic authorities debate as to whether covering the head at all times is required. According to some authorities, the practice has since taken on the force of law. The Shulchan Arukh rules that Jewish men should cover their heads and should not walk more than four cubits bareheaded. Covering one's head is described as "honoring God". According to the Mishnah Berurah, the Achronim established a requirement to wear a head covering even when traversing fewer than four cubits, and even when one is standing still, indoors, or outside. Kitzur Shulchan Aruch ruled that even boys should cover their heads, as they too must be taught to fear God. In Orthodox communities, boys are encouraged to wear a kippah from a young age in order to ingrain the habit. The 17th-century authority David HaLevi Segal argued that as European non-Jews are accustomed to going bareheaded, and their priests insist on officiating with bare heads, this constitutes a uniquely non-Jewish practice. Therefore, he concludes, Jews are prohibited from behaving similarly, and must cover their heads. In a recent responsum, Rabbi Ovadia Yosef ruled that head coverings should be worn to show affiliation with the religiously observant community.

Other opinions were more lenient. According to Maimonides, Jewish law requires a man to cover his head during prayer (but implicitly, not at other times). Isaac ben Moses of Vienna (13th century) wrote that "our rabbis in France" customarily made blessings while bareheaded, though he criticized this practice. Other Halachic authorities, like Chaim Yosef David Azulai, hold that wearing a head covering is not required, but is rather a midat hasidut (an "expression of piety", i.e., praiseworthy but not required). For this reason, the Vilna Gaon even ruled that one can make a berakhah without a head covering. In the 21st century, there has been an effort to suppress earlier sources that practiced this leniency, including erasing lenient responsa from newly published books. Promotional images used by the Orthodox Yeshiva University show board members bareheaded as late as 1954.

In non-Orthodox communities, some women also wear kippot, and people have different customs about when to wear a kippah—when eating, praying, studying Jewish texts, or entering a sacred space such as a synagogue or cemetery. The Reform movement historically opposed wearing kippot, but attitudes began to shift in the postwar era, as various social movements encouraged pride in cultural heritage. By the 1970s, the movement had returned to many traditional practices. In the 21st century, wearing a kippah during Torah study or prayer has become common and accepted as an option among Reform men and women.

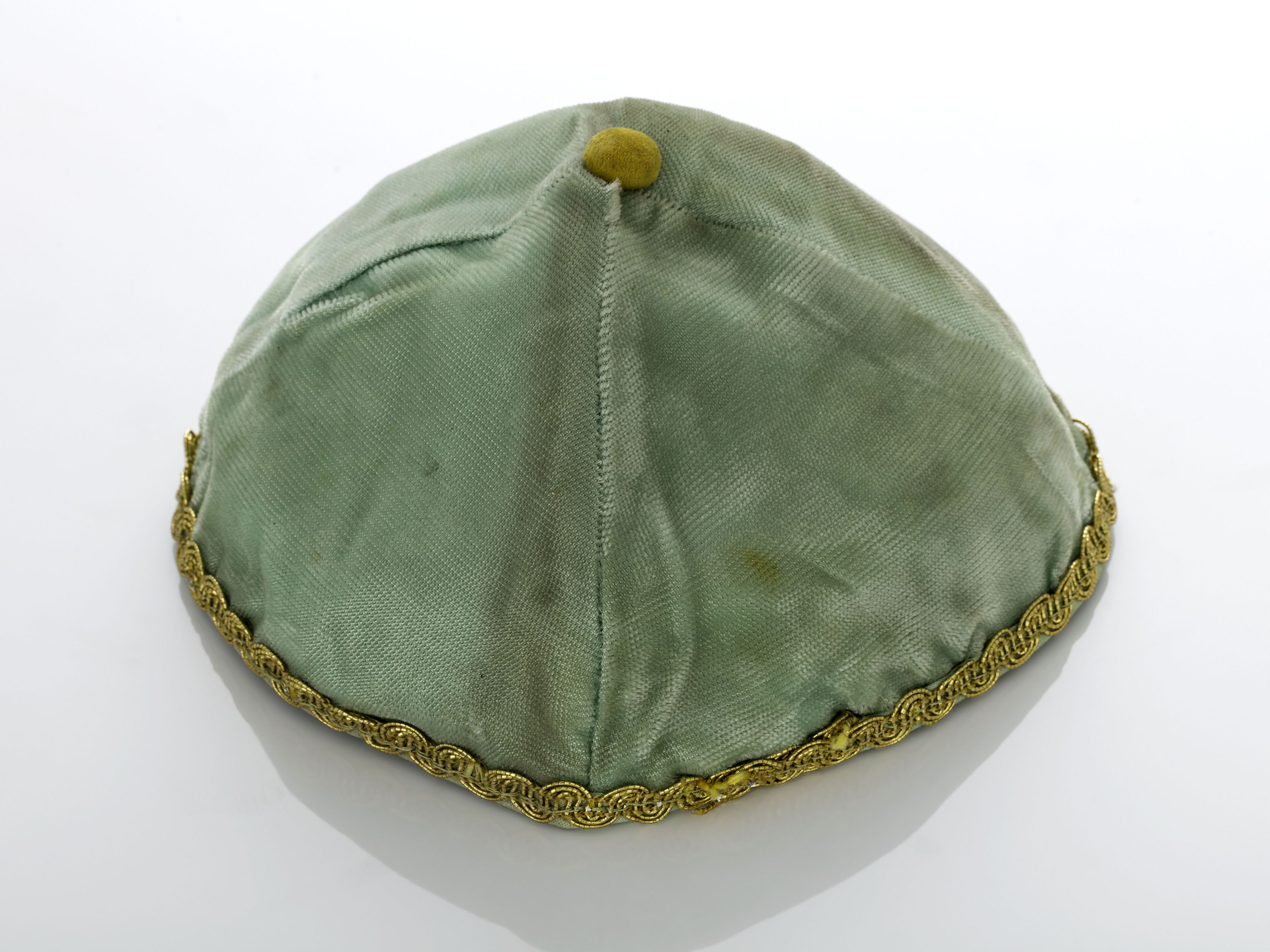
Green kippah found in a Jewish home in Oświęcim in Poland. Collection of the Auschwitz Jewish Center in Oświęcim

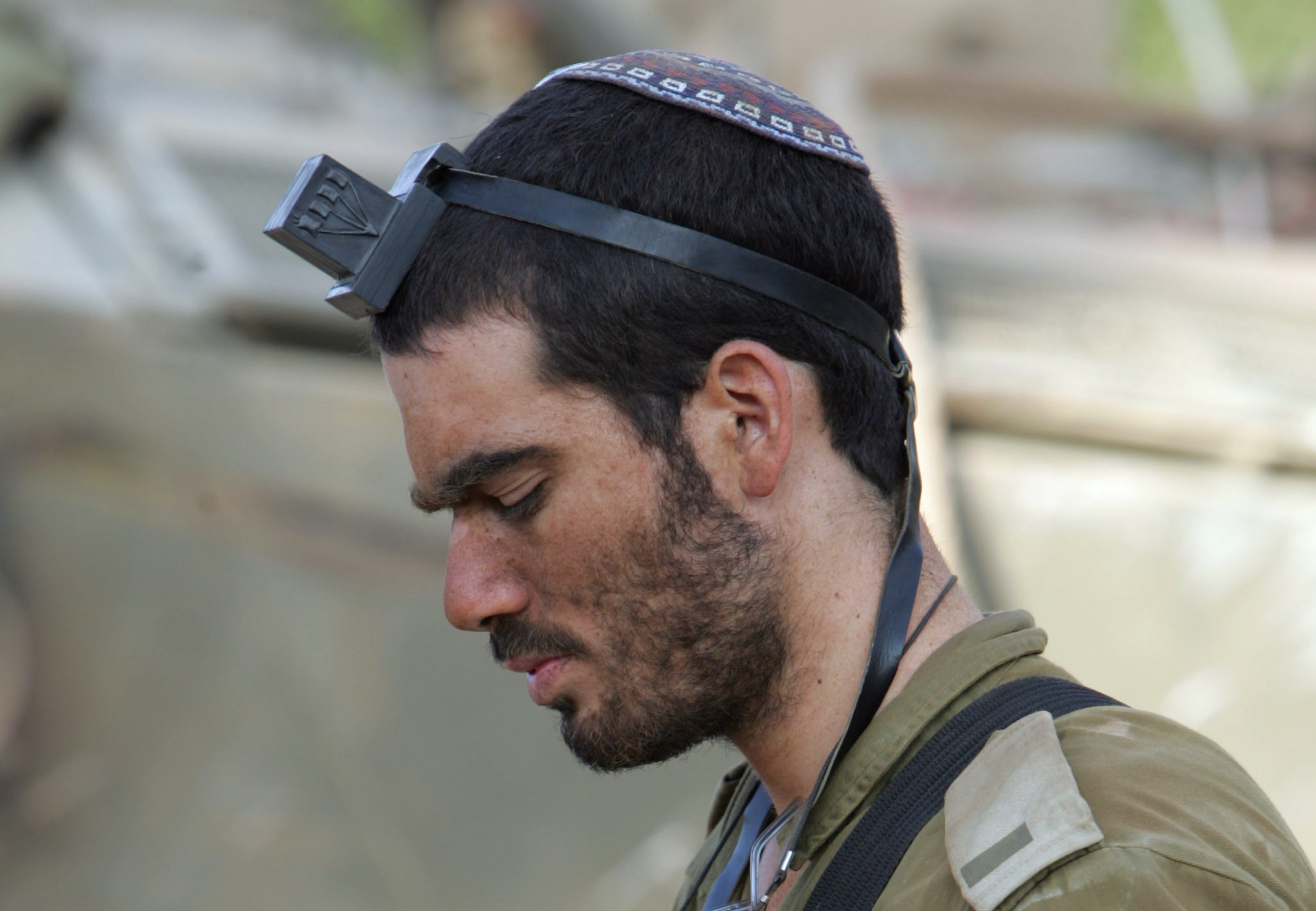
IDF soldier Lt. Asael Lubotzky prays with kippah and tefillin (box of scrolls)

According to 20th-century rabbi Isaac Klein, a male Conservative Jew ought to cover his head when in the synagogue, at prayer or sacred study, when engaging in a ritual act, and when eating. In the mid-19th century, early Reform Jews led by Isaac Mayer Wise completely rejected the kippah after an altercation in which Wise's kippah was knocked off his head. Nowadays, almost all Conservative synagogues require men to wear a head covering (usually a kippah), but in Reform synagogues there is no requirement. However, kippot may be provided to anybody who wishes to wear them.

== Types and variation ==
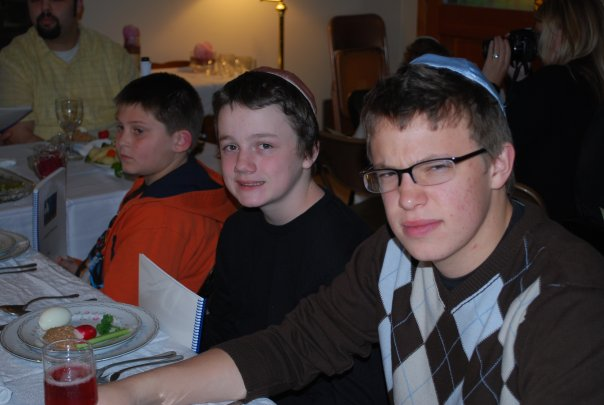
A Passover seder with two boys wearing kippot

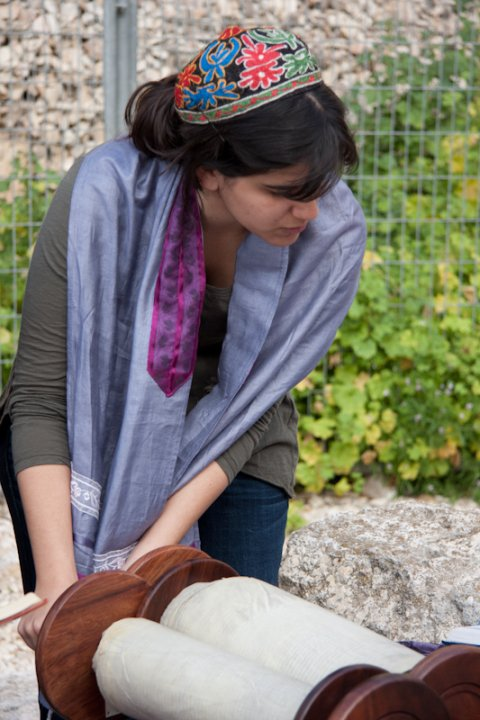
A woman wearing a kippah while studying the Torah

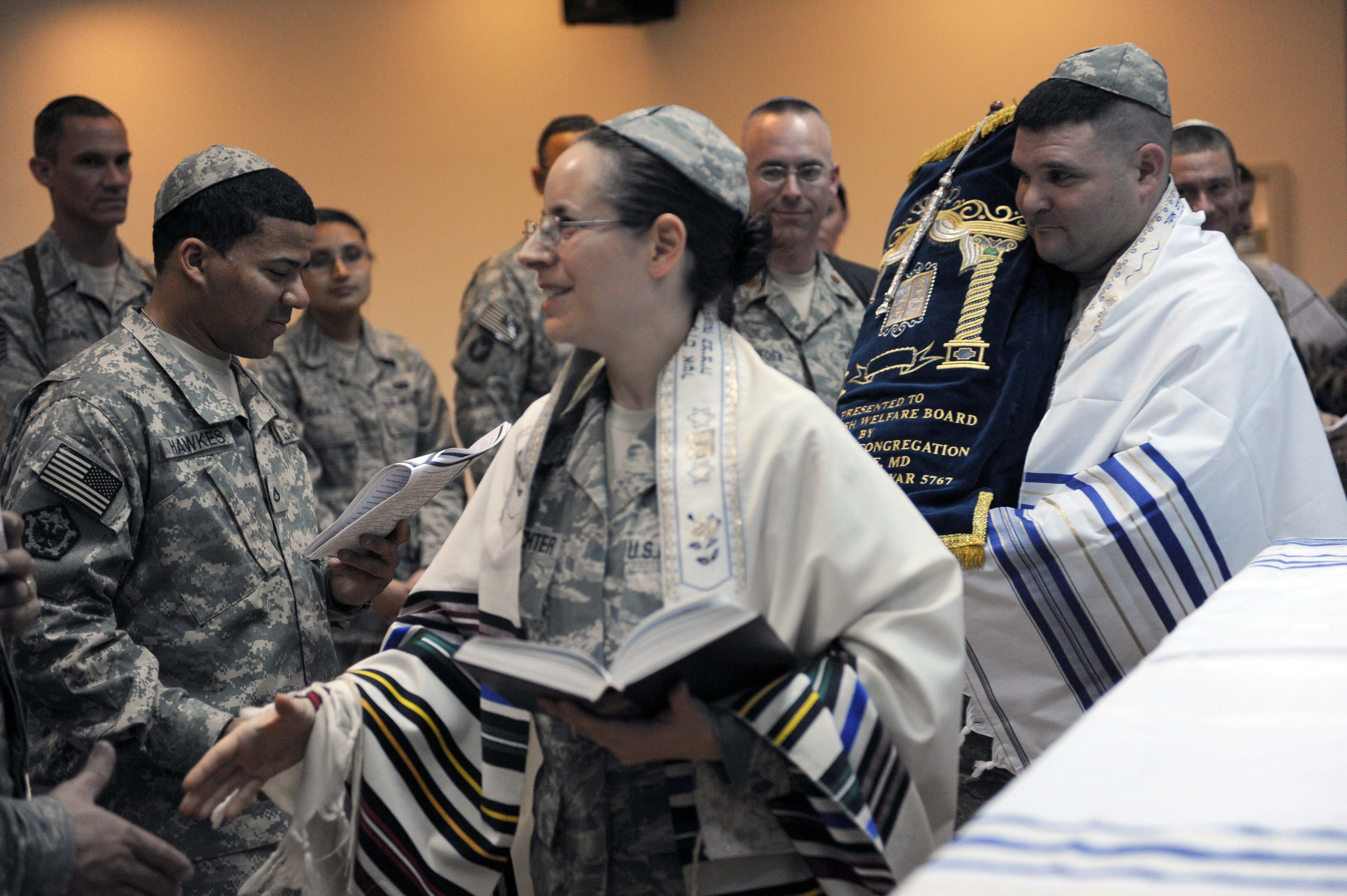
Rabbinical chaplain Sarah Schechter with fellow U.S. Airmen wearing camouflage kippot

During the Middle Ages in Europe, the distinctive Jewish headgear was the Jewish hat, a full hat with a brim and a central point or stalk. Originally used by choice among Jews to distinguish themselves, it was later made compulsory by Christian governments in some places as a discriminatory measure. In the early 19th century in the United States, rabbis often wore a scholar's cap (a large saucer-shaped cap of cloth, like a beret) or a Chinese skullcap. Other Jews of this era wore black pillbox-shaped kippot.

Often, the color and fabric of the kippah can be a sign of adherence to a specific religious movement, particularly in Israel. Knitted or crocheted kippot, known as kippot serugot, are usually worn by Religious Zionists and Modern Orthodox Jews. They also wear suede or leather kippot. Knitted kippot were first made in the late 1940s, and became popular after being worn by Rabbi Moshe-Zvi Neria. Members of most Haredi groups wear black velvet or cloth kippot.

More recently, kippot in specific colors are sometimes worn to indicate political or community affiliation, such as the LGBT community, or in the colors of sports teams, especially football. In the United States, children's kippot featuring cartoon characters or themes such as Star Wars have become popular; in response to this trend, some Jewish schools have banned kippot with characters that do not conform to traditional Jewish values. Kippot have been inscribed on the inside as a souvenir for a celebration (bar/bat mitzvah or wedding). Kippot for women are also being made and worn. These are sometimes made of beaded wire to seem more feminine. A special baby kippah has two strings on each side to fasten it and is often used in a brit milah ceremony.

Image	Type	Movement
	Crocheted	Religious Zionism, Modern Orthodox, Conservative Judaism, Reform Judaism
	Suede	Modern Orthodox, Conservative Judaism, Reform Judaism
	Terylene	Yeshivish, Hasidic, Haredi, Lubavitch – Popular among Rabbis teaching in yeshivas and seminaries
	Black velvet	Yeshivish, Hasidic, Haredi
	Satin	Conservative Judaism, Reform Judaism; In Israel: Hilonim and Masortim during major Jewish traditions
	White crocheted	Many Jerusalemites wear a full-head-sized, white crocheted kippah, sometimes with a knit pom-pom or tassel on top. The Na Nach subgroup of the Breslov Hasidim, followers of Rabbi Yisroel Ber Odesser, wear it with the Na Nach Nachma Nachman Meuman phrase crocheted in or embroidered on it.
	Bukharan	Popular with children, and also worn by some Sephardi Jews, as well as liberal-leaning and Reform Jews.
	Yemenite	Typically stiff, black velvet with a 1–2 cm (0.39–0.79 in) embroidered strip around the edge having a multi-colored geometric, floral, or paisley pattern.

== Civil legal issues ==
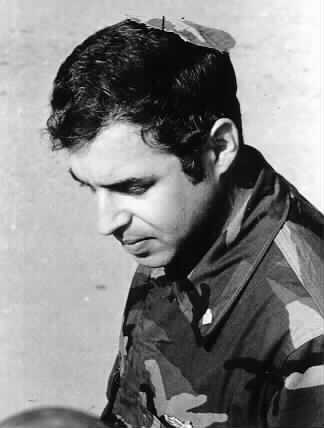
Kippah improvised from a piece of military uniform

In Goldman v. Weinberger, 475 U.S. 503 (1986), the United States Supreme Court ruled in a 5–4 decision that active military members were required to remove the kippah indoors, citing uniform regulations that state only armed security police may keep their heads covered while indoors.

Congress passed the Religious Apparel Amendment after a war story from the 1983 Beirut barracks bombing about the "camouflage kippah" of Jewish Navy Chaplain Arnold Resnicoff was read into the Congressional Record. Catholic Chaplain George Pucciarelli tore off a piece of his Marine Corps uniform to replace Resnicoff's kippah when it had become blood-soaked after being used to wipe the faces of wounded Marines after the 1983 Beirut barracks bombing. This amendment was eventually incorporated into U.S. Department of Defense (DOD) regulations on the "Accommodation of Religious Practices Within the Military Services".

This story of the "camouflage kippah" was re-told at many levels, including a keynote speech by President Ronald Reagan to the Baptist Fundamentalism Annual Convention in 1984, and another time during a White House meeting between Reagan and the American Friends of Lubavitch. After recounting the Beirut story, Reagan asked them about the religious meaning of the kippah. Rabbi Abraham Shemtov, the leader of the group, responded: "Mr. President, the kippah to us is a sign of reverence." Rabbi Feller, another member of the group, continued: "We place the kippah on the very highest point of our being—on our head, the vessel of our intellect—to tell ourselves and the world that there is something which is above man's intellect: the infinite Wisdom of God."

Passage of the Religious Apparel Amendment and the subsequent DOD regulations were followed in 1997 by the passing of the Religious Freedom Restoration Act (RFRA). However, the Supreme Court struck down RFRA as beyond Congress's powers to bind the states in the 1997 case City of Boerne v. Flores. RFRA is constitutional as applied to the Federal government, as seen in Gonzales v. O Centro Espirita Beneficente Uniao do Vegetal.

The Religious Land Use and Institutionalized Persons Act of 2000 (RLUIPA), 114 Stat. 804, 42 U. S. C. §2000cc-1(a)(1)-(2), upheld as constitutional in Cutter v. Wilkinson, 44 U.S. 709 (2005), requires by inference that Orthodox Jewish prisoners be reasonably accommodated in their request to wear kippot.

The French government banned the wearing of kippot, hijabs, and large crosses in public primary and secondary schools in France in March 2004.

The government of Quebec, Canada passed "An Act respecting the laicity of the State" in June 2019, which prohibits the wearing of "religious symbols" by government employees including teachers, police officers, judges, prosecutors, and members of certain commissions.

== Wearing by non-Jews ==
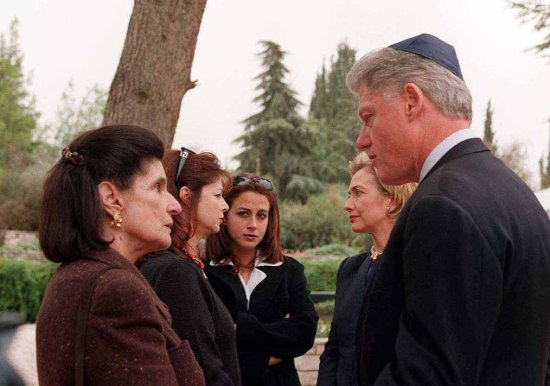
U.S. President Bill Clinton wearing a kippah to visit the grave of Yitzhak Rabin on Mount Herzl

Though it is not required, it is considered a sign of respect when a non-Jew wears a kippah in a synagogue. Kippot are often provided to guests at a Bar or Bat Mitzvah. They are also often provided at bereavement events and at Jewish cemeteries. According to the Conservative Committee on Jewish Law and Standards, there is no halakhic reason to require a non-Jew to cover their head, but it is recommended that non-Jews be asked to wear a kippah where ritual or worship is being conducted, both out of respect for the Jewish congregation and as a gesture of respect to include the non-Jewish guest.

Kippot were adopted as a symbol by some of the non-Jewish African American marchers in the 1965 Selma to Montgomery marches, most prominently by James Bevel.

The Hungarian Methodist pastor Gábor Iványi wears a kippah while leading his Bible study meetings.

== See also ==
- Head covering for Jewish women
- Jewish hat
- Taqiyah, a similar skullcap culturally worn by Muslim men
- Kufi, a similar cap culturally worn by Muslim and African men
- Zucchetto, a similar skullcap worn by Catholic clergy
- Srugim, an Israeli television show named after the knit kippah worn by Religious Zionists
- List of hat styles
