= Yisroel Ber Odesser =

Israeli Hasidic rabbi

Rabbi Yisroel Dov Ber Odesser
- Reb Odesser
- Title: Sabba

Personal life
- Born: 20 Kislev 5649; 23 or 24 Nov 1888 Tiberias, Ottoman Empire
- Died: October 23rd, 1994 Israel
- Buried: Har HaMenuchot
- Spouse: Esther
- Occupation: Rabbi

Religious life
- Religion: Judaism

Jewish leader
- Organisation: Breslov

Yisroel Dov Ber Odesser (Hebrew: ישראל דב בער אדסר) (approx. 1888 – 23 October 1994), also known as Reb Odesser or Sabba ("grandfather" in Hebrew), was a Breslover Hasid and rabbi who claimed to have received a "Letter From Heaven" sent directly to him by Rebbe Nachman of Breslov, who had died 112 years earlier, revealing to him a new remedy for relieving the world's suffering and illness. This remedy is the song and name Na Nach Nachma Nachman Meuman, which he revealed in his old age to newfound followers throughout Israel. His following developed into the Na Nach movement. Some controversies surround the origin of the Letter, Rabbi Odesser's bold claims regarding Na Nach Nachma Nachman Meuman, and his position in the Breslov movement.

== Introduction to Breslov ==
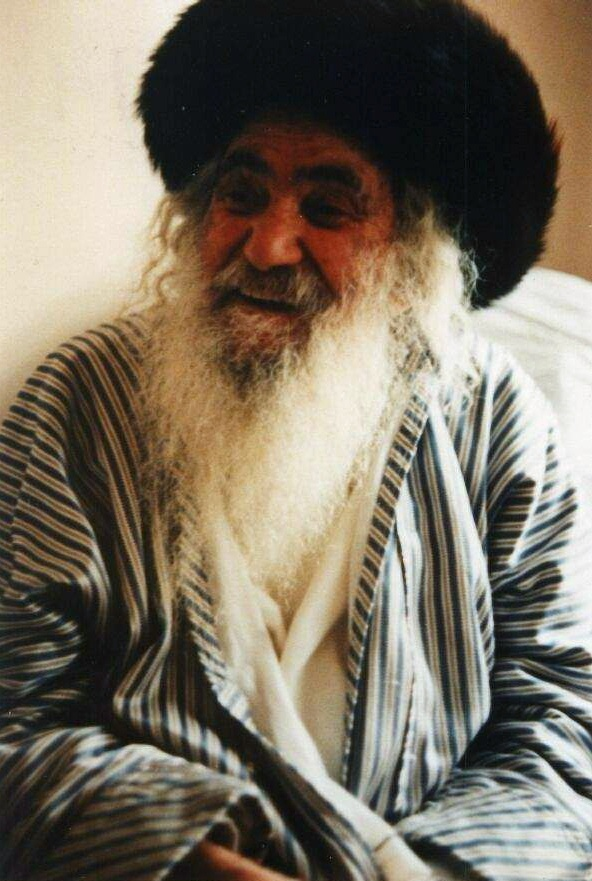
Rabbi Yisroel Ber Odesser

Odesser was born in Tiberias when Israel was under Ottoman rule, to a family which for generations were Karliner Hasidim. (His great-great-grandfather, Rabbi Yekutiel Zalman Leib, was a close disciple of Rabbi Abraham Kalisker, a major disciple of the Baal Shem Tov.) In his youth, Odesser also followed the Karliner way, but felt it was not fulfilling his soul.

Odesser first came into contact with the teachings of Rebbe Nachman of Breslov as a young yeshiva student in Tiberias. Someone had ripped the cover off a Hebrew language holy book and thrown it into the garbage. Orthodox Judaism forbids defacing a holy book in this way, so Odesser rescued it with the intention of burying it, as is proper for worn-out Jewish holy books. Before discarding it, however, he decided to read it. This book was Hishtafchut HaNefesh (Outpouring of the Soul) by Alter Tepliker, which contains excerpts from Rebbe Nachman's writings about meditation and personal prayer. Because the cover was missing, Odesser did not know who the author was, but the teachings worked for him. Only later did he learn it was a Breslover book.

The first Breslover Hasid whom he met in person was Rabbi Yisroel Halpern (also known as Yisroel Karduner), who came one day to buy bread from Odesser's parents. The young Odesser knew immediately that he had found his teacher, but his parents were strongly opposed to the Breslover path. Eventually his father threw him out of the house and attempted to stop his upcoming wedding. This did not deter him, and he continued to study with Halpern. The wedding took place as planned. Odesser's wife, Esther, supported him through many sufferings and much ridicule from the local townsfolk.

In those days, it was commonly said among Jews that anyone who became a Breslover Hasid would eventually go insane. This is probably because Breslovers try to spend at least an hour per day in hitbodedut, personal communion with God, which they often performed alone in the woods or fields, often at night, meditating and crying out to God. This was not a usual Jewish practice at the time, and was regarded with deep suspicion. Jews normally prayed indoors with a minyan, not alone in the woods. (The Breslov practice of hitbodedut is in addition to the liturgical prayers.) Moreover, when Odesser would pray in the synagogue, it was with such intense fervor that he often began to clap, dance, and spin ecstatically for hours.

During the time the British entered Tiberias in World War I, a plague broke out in the city. Halpern became very ill and eventually died, along with most of his family. After Halpern's death in 1918, Odesser became a personal attendant of Rabbi Solomon Eliezer Alfandari, the great Sephardi rav and kabbalist known as the Saba Kadisha, who was living in Tiberias at the time. After seeing Odesser recite the Tikkun Chatzot (Midnight Lament over the destruction of the Beis Hamikdash) one night, however, the Saba Kadisha refused to let him attend him anymore, and instead treated him as a young colleague.

After that, Odesser traveled to Jerusalem, where he studied with the elders of the Breslover community in that city.

== Correspondence with Zalman Shazar ==
On a rainy Tu Bishvat night in 1957, Zalman Shazar (who would become the third President of Israel) was with a friend in Meron. There they saw a Hasid, Odesser, reciting the Tikkun Chatzot ("Midnight Lament") with intense fervor. They were very moved by this, and, when the Hasid had finished, they asked who he was. Thus began a lifelong friendship between Shazar and Odesser. Over the years, Odesser wrote many letters to Shazar, explaining the Breslov way of personal prayer and devotion, and urging him to return to God (Shazar was non-religious at the time). Shazar was greatly inspired by these letters and did become more religious. He later published the letters, along with a short biography of Odesser, in a Hebrew book entitled Ibay Ha-Nachal (in Hebrew: אבי הנחל). In 1995, this book was translated into English as Young Buds of the Stream.

The word "ibey" (אבי), meaning buds, in the Hebrew title of the book, is a reversal of the abbreviation of Odesser's name (ישראל בער אדסר). The Hebrew title "Ibey Ha-Nachal" therefore has the double meanings "Yisroel Odesser, the stream/river" and "Young Buds of the Stream".

== Discovering the Na Nach phrase ==
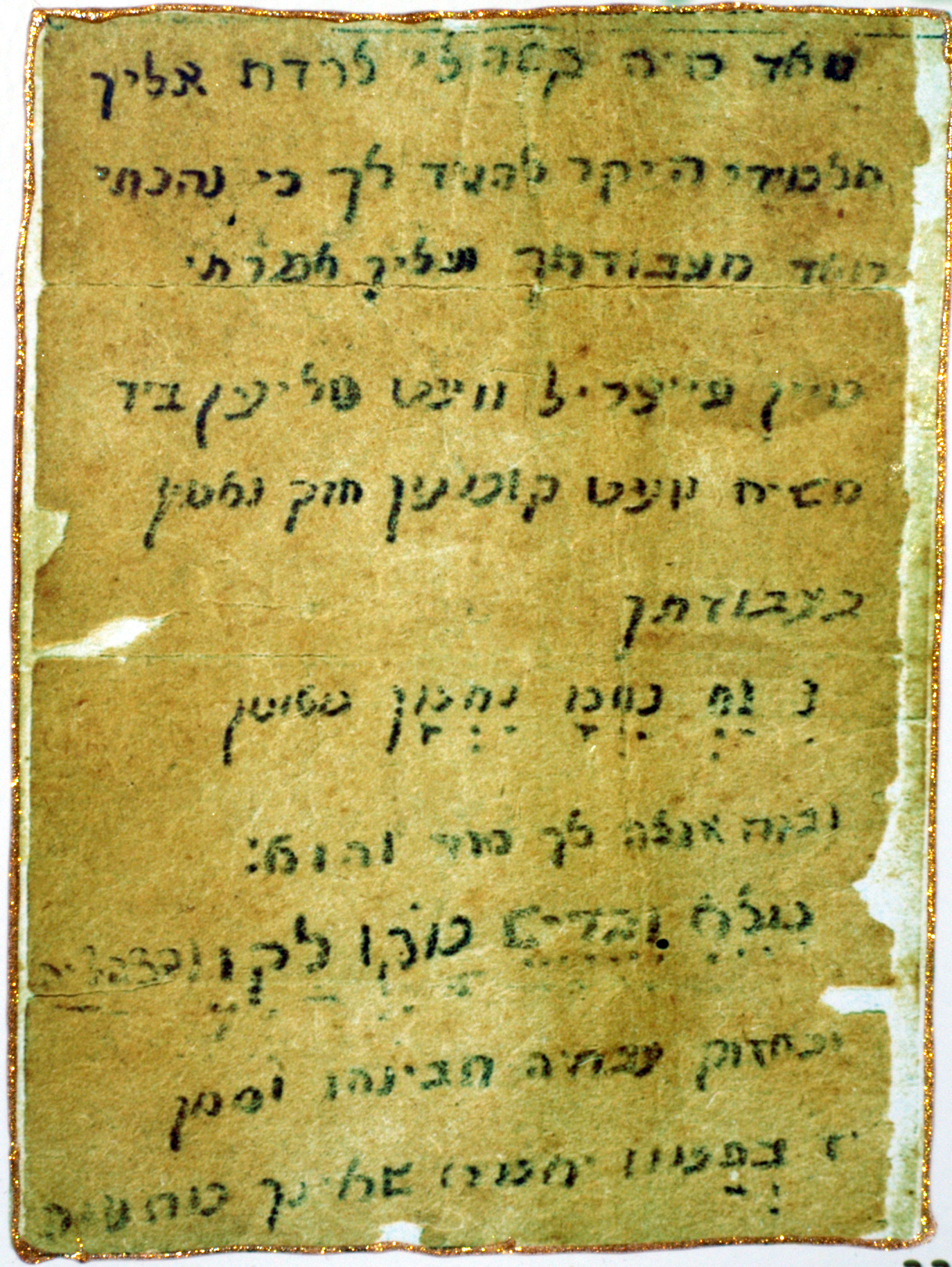
A reproduction of the "Letter from Heaven".

When he was approximately 24 years old, Odesser came into possession of a document later published as The Letter from Heaven (known colloquially as the Petek).

According to Odesser, he succumbed to cravings during the fast of the Seventeenth of Tammuz and he ate something. He was severely distraught as a result. For six days he suffered intensely and felt like a dead man. He prayed and had a "powerful thought enter [his] mind" to "Go to your room and open the bookcase, and put your hand and any book…and open it to wherever it opens…and there you will find good things that will enable you to revive yourself; there you will find a healing for your soul!" Acting on this thought, he chose a book, opened it, and found a letter inside containing words of greeting and encouragement, along with a phrase in the Hebrew language based on the four letters of the name Nachman (i.e., Rebbe Nachman of Breslov), added one letter at a time, in a Kabbalistic achorayim form.

Another Hasid by the name of Yoel said later that he had been the one who wrote the letter to Odesser after seeing how distraught he was over having to break his fast. Odesser claimed in rebuttal that his room had been locked and only he had the key, and maintained that this document was miraculously communicated to him.

=== Na Nach movement ===
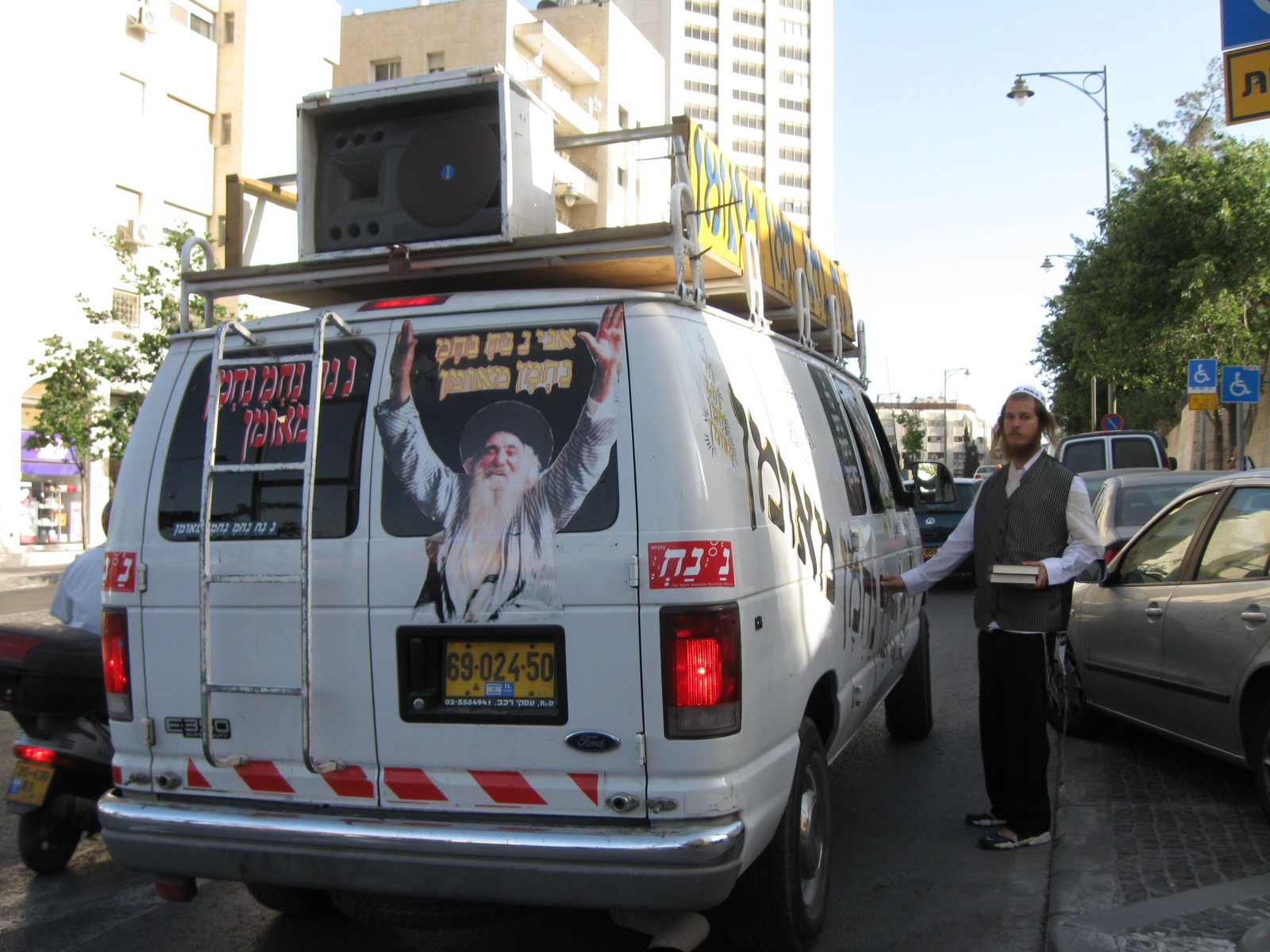
A Na Nach Breslover Hasid stands beside a van emblazoned with images of Rabbi Yisroel Ber Odesser and the Na Nach Nachma Nachman Meuman phrase in downtown Jerusalem.

Odesser's publicizing of Na Nach Nachma Nachman Meuman was rejected by mainstream Breslovers for many decades. Around 1984, when he was approximately 86 years old and living in an old age home in Ra'anana, Israel, a group of baalei teshuva (returnees to the Jewish faith) discovered Odesser and were attracted to his teachings. He eventually became their spiritual leader. The name and song, Na Nach Nachma Nachman Meuman was adopted by this subgroup of Breslover Hasidim and has appeared on billboards, bumper stickers, and knitted yarmulkes, as well as in musical compositions of this group (colloquially known as the Na Nachs) ever since.

== Final years ==
=== Meeting with Rabbi Moshe Feinstein ===
In the early 1980s, Rabbi Odesser met with Rabbi Moshe Feinstein, who had seen the petek and wished to meet its owner. At the meeting, Rabbi Feinstein asked Rabbi Odesser for a blessing, and Rabbi Feinstein also called in his wife to get a blessing from Rabbi Odesser. Rabbi Feinstein gave Rabbi Odesser the following approbation:

I am writing on behalf of a most unusual individual, Rabbi Yisroel Dov Odesser, shlita, from Israel. This individual is a gaon in Torah. I had the pleasure of recently meeting with him. I saw a secret document he possesses; it is something very wondrous.

Rabbi Odesser is soliciting funds to enable him to print Rabbi Nachman's sefarim, and it is a great mitzvah to assist him in this endeavor. Hashem will reward all those that so assist him.

Rabbi Moshe Feinstein

Those who doubt the authenticity of the petek downplay Rabbi Feinstein's approbation by saying that he was known for his lovingkindness and his desire to help people. They say that all Rabbi Feinstein wrote was that the petek was wondrous, but he didn't verify its authenticity.

=== Drawing followers ===
In his later years, Odesser attracted many new followers to Breslov. Many families immigrated to Israel from France. He spent time living anywhere from a week to a month or longer in the homes of his new followers. He would most frequently reside in Meron, Tzefat, Tiberias, Ramat Gan, Bnei Brak, Beitar, Mevaseret Zion, and in the Jerusalem neighborhoods of Har Nof, the Old City, and Neve Yaakov.

=== Keren Israel Dov Odesser ===
Odesser collected close to half a million dollars in tzedaka (charity) money in two years without leaving his wheelchair. People would run to bring him pidyonot. He left the entire sum to establish Keren Yisroel Dov Odesser for printing and distributing the books of Rebbe Nachman at subsidized prices. The Keren was run by Rabbi Amram Horowitz, Odesser's grandson and grandson of Shmuel Horowitz of Breslov fame, until his death in 2009.

=== "I am Na Nach Nachma Nachman Meuman!" ===
A few days before his death at the age of 106, Rabbi Odesser recorded these words on tape:

All the world, and the whole government, do not know who I am! Behold, I inform them who I am! I am Na Nach Nachma Nachman Meuman!

Who is the Rebbe of the whole world? Rebbe Na Nach Nachma Nachman Meuman!

I am Na Nach Nachma Nachman Meuman!

His detractors thought he had gone senile and was literally claiming to be Nachman of Breslov, who is buried in Uman, Ukraine. Others say he was speaking of his total identification with the name Na Nach Nachma Nachman Meuman and with Rebbe Nachman. Still others say he had become a "spiritual emanation" of the soul of Rebbe Nachman.

=== Death and burial ===
Odesser died on 23 October 1994 and was buried on Har HaMenuchot (Gush 11, Chelka bet), Jerusalem. On his tombstone is engraved: "Rabbi Israel Dov Ber Odesser, a"h, [who] said, 'I am Na Nach Nachma Nachman Meuman.'"

== Video and audio links ==
=== Videos ===
- Rabbi Yisroel Ber Odesser on YouTube
