= David Solomon (writer) =

Australian educator, scholar, editor, translator and writer

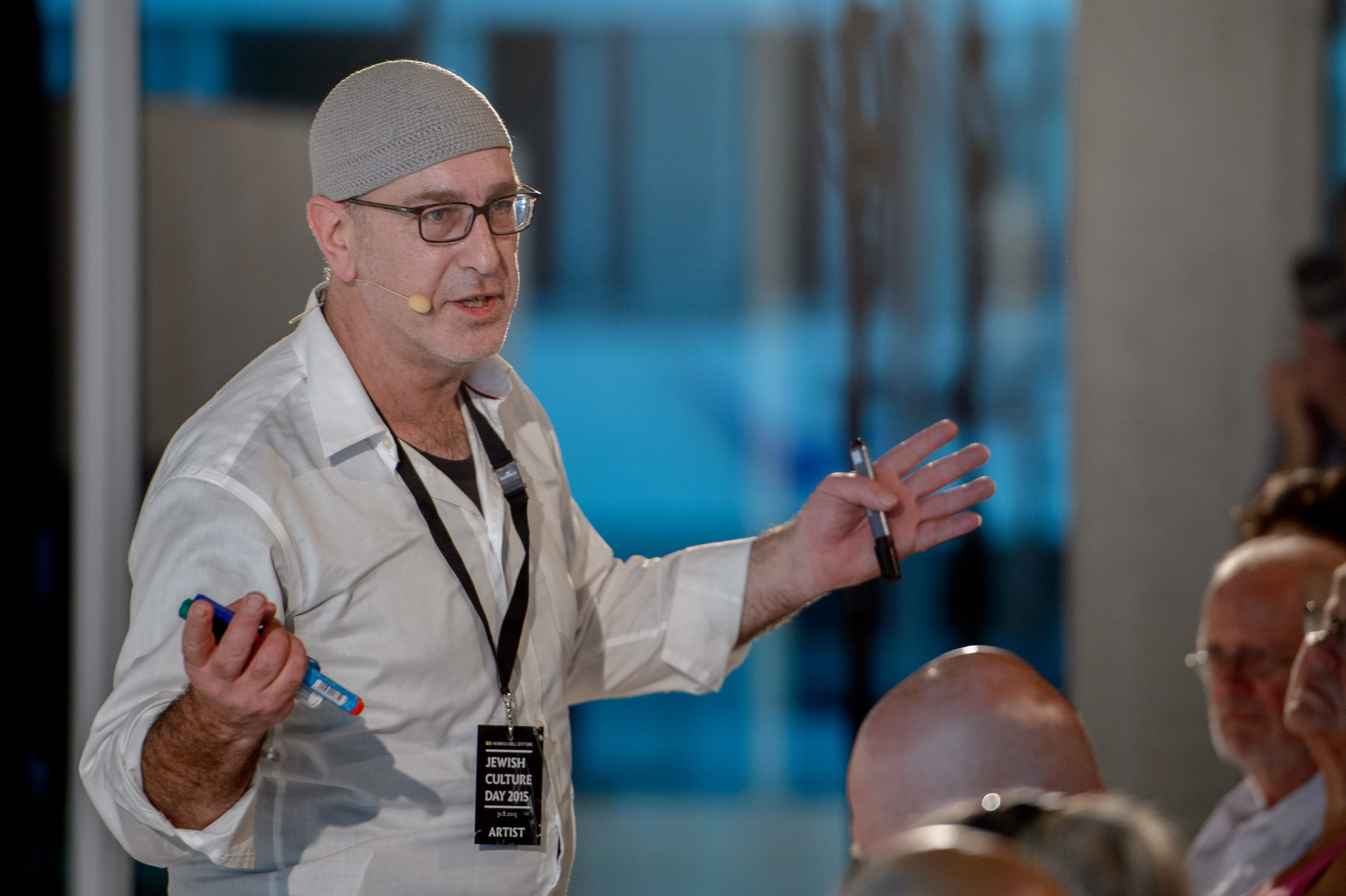
- Born: Newcastle, Australia
- Occupation: Managing editor (Margalya Press)
- Known for: The Whole of Jewish History in One Hour

David Solomon is an Australian educator, scholar, editor, translator and writer. His main focus is in the area of Jewish education.

== Early life ==
A seventh-generation Australian, Solomon was born in Newcastle, New South Wales, the eldest child of Geoffrey and Julia Solomon. In 1970, the Solomon family relocated to Perth, Western Australia.

== Education ==
Solomon attended Carmel School, Mount Lawley Senior High School, and completed his HSC at Yeshiva College, Melbourne.

Following high school, Solomon spent several years in yeshivot in Australia and Israel before gaining academic degrees in anthropology (BA) and English literature (BA Hons) from the University of Western Australia, and a doctorate in translation studies from Monash University. Solomon also holds an associate diploma in Media Broadcasting from the Western Australian Academy of Performing Arts.

== Career ==
Solomon has lectured throughout the world on a range of topics, from Modern and Biblical Hebrew, to Kabbalah and Jewish history, as well as Anthropology of religion and Conceptual Art. Since its launch in 2019, his podcast Collected Talks of David Solomon has released weekly recordings of his lectures.

In early 2005 Solomon gave the lecture, The Whole of Jewish History in One Hour. By December 2006, he had expanded this concept known as the 'In One Hour' series. In 2008 he produced a book called The Whole of Jewish History in One Hour.

Solomon promotes study of Jewish history and Hebrew language as the two most essential areas of learning for the Jewish world to ensure that students are reliant on their own knowledge and not teachers. Solomon's educational philosophy aims to provide students with the necessary tools to be able to take responsibility for their own Jewish education.

In March 2012, Solomon took a commissioned scholarship in residence with Neshama Life in Sydney to work on the first-ever full translation into English of the kabbalistic text Tikunei haZohar. The translation is scheduled to be published in 2023.

He has been appointed scholar-in-residence at numerous organisations around the world including, until recently, Caulfield Hebrew Congregation. He has also taken a role as the coordinator of the conversion program at St Kilda Hebrew Congregation, running the first free group sessions for people wishing to convert.

In 2021, Solomon co-founded the Jewish publishing company, Margalya Press, where he holds the position of Managing Editor.

=== Other projects ===
In the 1980s and 1990s, Solomon collaborated extensively with artist Rodney Glick on a range of projects, including the Glick International Collection’s Klusian Philosophy and the Alice Black Theory of Emerging Art. As part of this collaboration, Solomon created the fictional philosopher Jean-Bernard Klus and wrote two books, one in the name of Klus (The Handbook of the Finite Mind) and the other in the name of Klus’s student Jose Palermo (Jose Palermo and the College of Disciples).

Solomon has produced a number of short films which have received distinction in a range of fringe film festivals in London and worked at various times during the 1980s and 1990s as a radio producer and presenter for the Australian Broadcasting Corporation and as an advertising copywriter.

== Personal life ==
Solomon has been married twice. His first marriage was with Eva Freeman but is now married to Marjorie Solomon (nee Syddall). He has three children and lives in Melbourne, Australia.

== Publications ==
- David Solomon (April 2008) The Whole of Jewish History in One Hour
- Jean-Bernard Klus The Handbook of the Finite Mind
- Jose Palermo Jose Palermo and the College of Disciples

=== Translations ===
- David Solomon, trans (forthcoming) Tiqqunei ha-Zohar Margalya, an annotated bilingual English translation
- Isaiah Tishby, (Cherub Press 2022) The Doctrine of Evil and the ‘Shell’ in Lurianic Kabbalah

== Sources ==
- Official website.
- Pearlman, M "David Solomon: Making Jewish Wisdom Accessible and Relevant", Jewish Week, April 30, 2010
- Steinberg, J. "LimmudLA: 4,000 years of Jewish history in one hour", LA Jewish Journal, January 25, 2008
- Rocker, S. "4,000 years of history in an hour", The Jewish Chronicle, March 8, 2007
- Glick International
- Hill, Peter "Lies and Superfictions" School of Creative Arts, University of Melbourne, 2004.
- Robinson, Matt "This Australian couple is bringing Jewish mysticism secrets to English" The Jerusalem Post, 2022
- Super, Mendel "Meet Australia’s Newest Supreme Court Justice, Rabbi Marcus Solomon" Chabad.org/News August 23, 2021
