= Julia Solomon =

Australian academic (1927–2016)

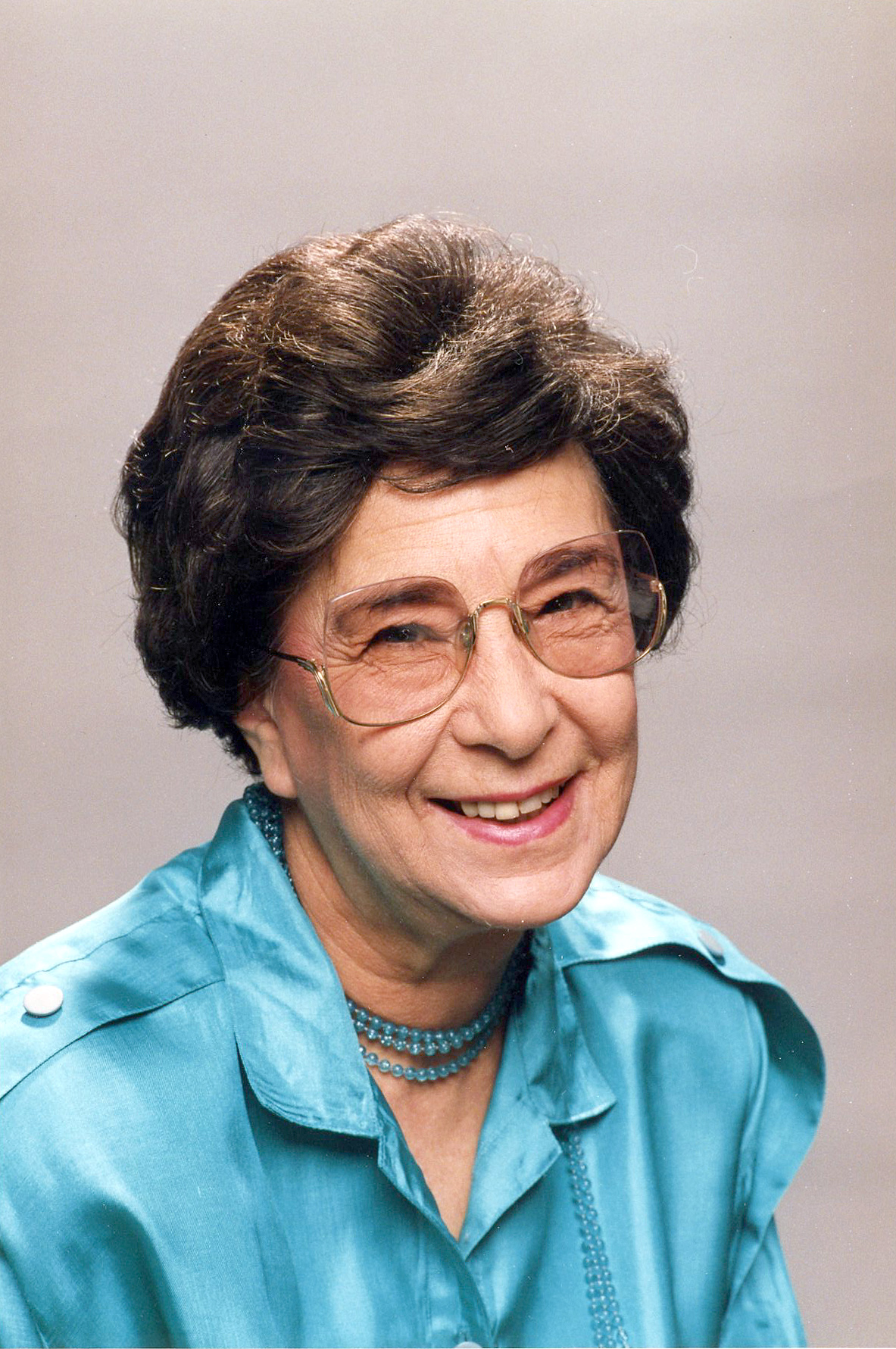
- Born: Julia Green; 21 April 1927; Newcastle, New South Wales, Australia
- Died: 25 April 2016 (aged 89)
- Known for: Reading For Sure

Academic background
- Education: University of Newcastle; Murdoch University (PhD)
- Thesis: The use of observations of child development for early childhood education (1984)

Academic work
- Discipline: Psychologist, educator
- Sub-discipline: Early childhood education

Julia Solomon (21 April 1927 – 25 April 2016) (born Julia Green) was an Australian early-childhood educator, academic, literacy theorist and developer of the Solomon Method of Reading.

In 1990, based upon decades of her own research and experience, Solomon developed Reading For Sure, a method for teaching effective English literacy to both children and adults. The implementation of Reading For Sure remained her primary professional focus until the end of her life. Solomon travelled widely around Australia and the world lecturing on her system, and established a franchising of her literacy clinics.

== Early life ==
Born Julia Green, Solomon was born in Newcastle, New South Wales, Australia, graduated from Perth Modern School in Western Australia in 1943 and from the Kindergarten Union of Western Australia (KUWA) and the Teacher Training College in 1947. Returning to Newcastle as an early-childhood teacher, she married Geoffrey Solomon in 1953, and lived in Newcastle and then Perth from 1970. Solomon began implementing her unique ideas regarding pre-school education at "The Hill" Kindergarten which she founded in 1960 in Newcastle.

== Education ==
Solomon returned to formal study in the 1960s, completing degrees in English and Clinical Psychology at the University of Newcastle in New South Wales. She received a master's degree in psychology (1974) and was awarded a PhD in education from Murdoch University (1980); her thesis was based upon ideas outlined in her earlier study Learning To Think (1973).

== Reading For Sure ==
As a practicing psychologist, Solomon observed that many of the children being referred to her for persistent "behavioural" problems were actually suffering from anxiety over their inability to read, and her clinical practice became increasingly directed towards basic literacy. Solomon noticed a remarkable reduction in behavioural problems amongst children once their anxiety over literacy was resolved.

I saw many children and teenagers, who came from English speaking homes, with literate parents, yet they were displaying signs of reading failures. I pondered on this and told myself I had to do something about this.

Throughout the 1970s and 1980s, Solomon developed a method of reading which simplified the written English language and greatly increased its consistency for readers. She also developed a method by which her diacritical system was to be taught. This became known as the Solomon Method, while her reading system as a whole was called Reading for Sure (RFS). In 1993, Solomon founded World Literacy International to manage and operate a campaign to disseminate RFS to the wider public.

== Publications ==
- Learning to Think(1973, Kindergarten Association of Western Australia). An analysis of cognitive growth and its application to early childhood education. In Learning to Think, Solomon analysed the development of children in prelogical years.
- Encounters(1976, Child Study Publications) -A resource schedule for early childhood.
- Encounters, Level 2(1976, Child Study Publications) -A resource schedule for early childhood.
- Fat Cat Sam (1993, World Literacy International). By Dr Julia Solomon Illustrations by Sara Bowen. Reading primer using the Reading for Sure system.
- Teaching Literacy from the Beginning(WLI, 2008) - a neuro-developmental theory for English reading instruction
- Stepping Ahead(WLI, 2009) - outlining a basic literacy program.
- The use of observations of child development for early childhood education (1984, manuscript, Murdoch University)
- Reading for Sure System Teaching Kit(1993, World Literacy International).
- Spelling For Sure Work Book (1993, World Literacy International).
- The Alphabet Song of World Literacy International (2008, World Literacy International).
- Stepping Ahead - Where Literacy Begins (2008, World Literacy International).
- Start Reading - A manual for the failure-free way with Phonological fun books (2009, World Literacy International).

== Legacy ==
Solomon's work was acknowledged in 2012 when she was named as a finalist for Senior Australian of the Year in a ceremony at Government House. The Reading for Sure program and clinics have continued through her student and close associate Lynne Wajon.

== Personal life ==
Throughout her life, Solomon was deeply involved in Jewish communal life in both Newcastle and Perth. She has three children: two sons, David Solomon and Rabbi Marcus Solomon SC, and a daughter Rina.
