= Na Nach =

Subgroup of Breslover Hasidim

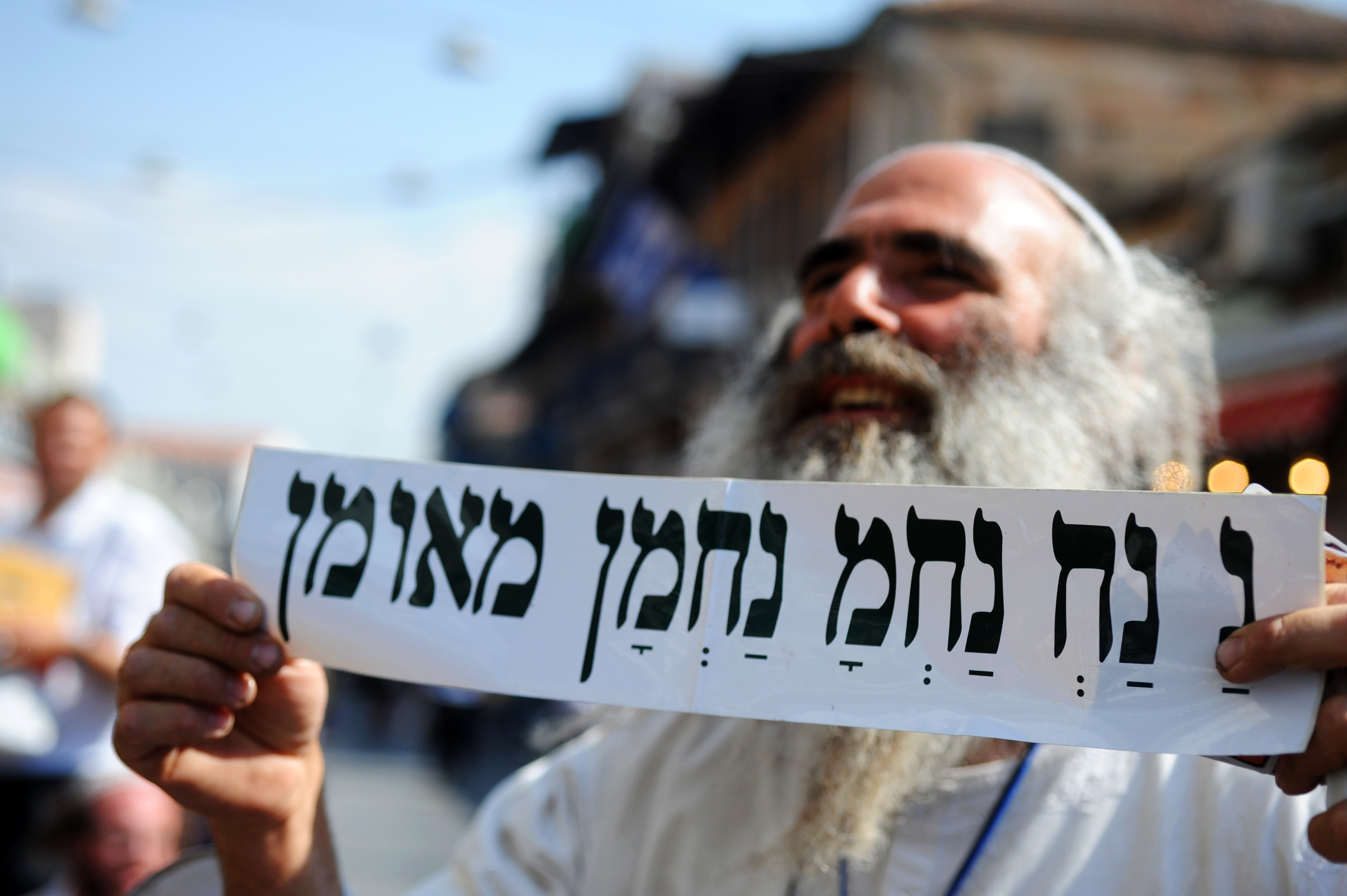
A Na Nach Breslover Hasid presents the common phrase on a bumper sticker in the Mahane Yehuda market, Jerusalem.

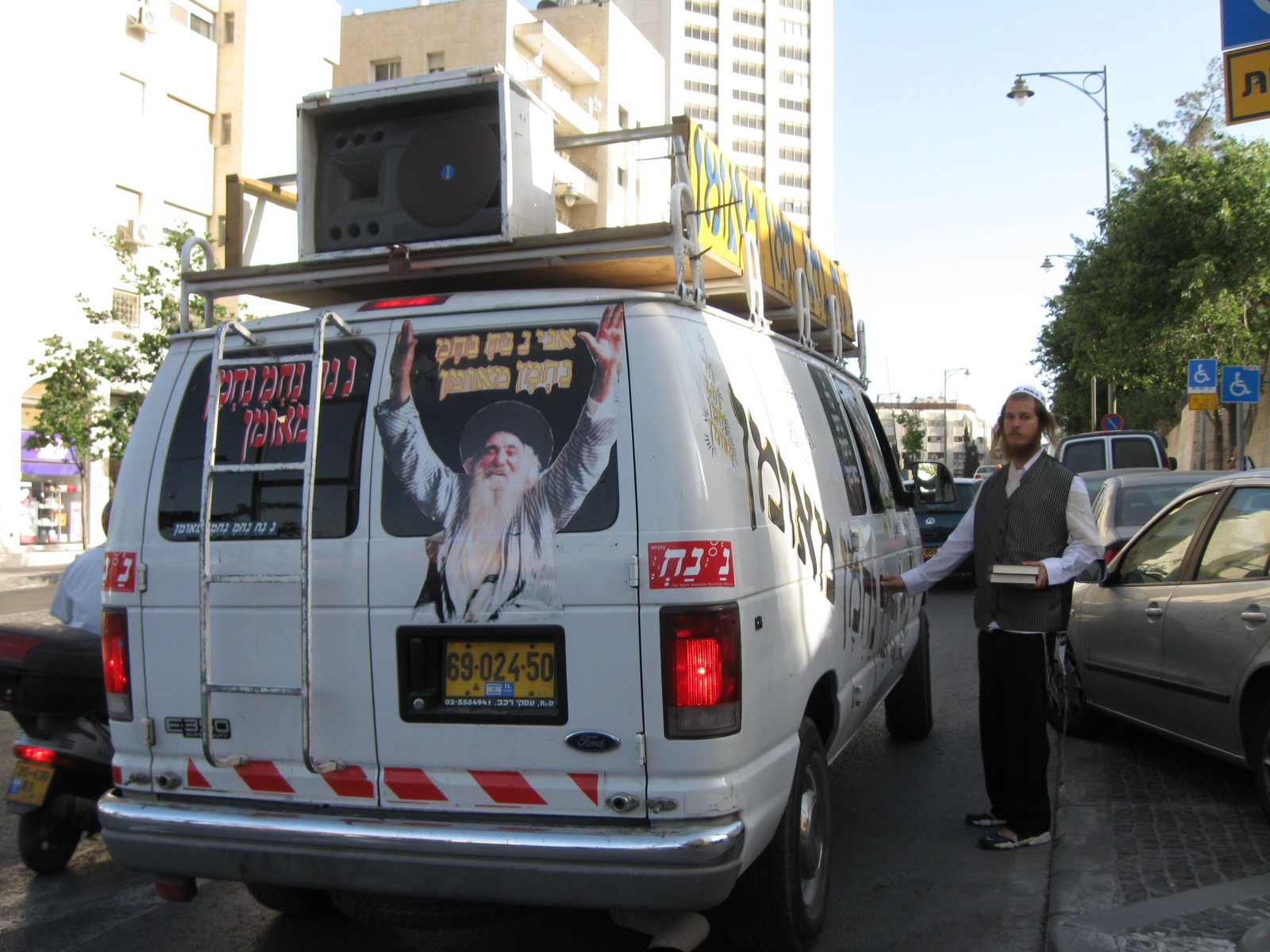
A Na Nach Breslover Hasid stands beside a van emblazoned with images of Rabbi Yisroel Ber Odesser and the "Na Nach Nachma Nachman Meuman" name in downtown Jerusalem.

Na Nach is the name of a subgroup of Breslover Hasidim that follows the teachings of Rabbi Nachman of Breslov, commonly known just as Rabbi Nachman. The followers are called Na Nachs, because their main "mantra" is "Na Nach Nachma Nachman me-Uman" which means "Nachman from the Ukrainian town of Uman", where Nachman lived and died.

The subgroup was founded by Rabbi Yisroel Ber Odesser, called the Saba, which means grandfather. The Saba is believed to have received an inspirational note, called the Petek (Hebrew: פֶּתֶק, 'note'), from the long-deceased Rabbi Nachman. Devotees of the group, colloquially called Na Nachs, make themselves quite visible in the streets of Tel Aviv, Jerusalem, Safed, Tiberias, and other Israeli cities as they dance atop and around moving vans to techno-Hasidic musical compositions, with the goal of spreading joy to passersby. They distribute their literature from sidewalk tables on the downtown streets and near bus stations, often accompanied by blaring music. They are identifiable by their large, white, crocheted yarmulkes bearing the name and song from the petek that Rabbi Odesser revealed: Na Nach Nachma Nachman Meuman. Besides publicizing this phrase on billboards and bumper stickers, Na Nachs and their admirers have made it a common graffiti throughout Israel.
