= Tikkun Chatzot =

Jewish ritual prayer recited each night after midnight

Tikkun Chatzot (Hebrew: תקון חצות, lit. "Midnight Rectification"), also spelled Tikkun Chatzos, is a Jewish ritual prayer recited each night after midnight as an expression of mourning and lamentation over the destruction of the Temple in Jerusalem. It is not universally observed, although it is popular among Sephardi and Hasidic Jews.

== Origin of the custom ==
The Talmudic sages wrote that every Jew should mourn the destruction of the Temple. The origin of the midnight time for prayer and study lies in Psalm 119:62, attributed to David: "At midnight I will rise to give thanks unto thee." It is said that David was satisfied with only "sixty breaths of sleep" (Sukk. 26b), and that he rose to pray and study Torah at midnight.

At first, Mizrahi Jews would add dirges (kinnot) for the destruction only on the three sabbaths that are between the Seventeenth of Tamuz and Tisha B'Av, and not on weekdays. After discussions that questioned this practice of mourning specifically on the Sabbath, it was decided to discontinue the recitation of the kinnot on these days. Rabbi Isaac Luria canceled the customs of mourning on the Sabbath but declared that the Tikkun Chatzot should be said each and every day.

The Shulchan Aruch 1:3 states, "It is fitting for every God-fearing person to feel grief and concern over the destruction of the Temple". The Mishnah Berurah comments, "The Kabbalists have discussed at great lengths the importance of rising at midnight [to say the Tikkun Chatzot, learn Torah, and to talk to God] and how great this is".

Sephardi communities in Jerusalem have a custom to sit on the floor and recite Tikkun Chatzot after halakhic midday during The Three Weeks. This custom is also mentioned in the Kitzur Shulchan Aruch, and is practiced in some Ashkenazic communities as well.

The Tanya mentions that one should recite Tikkun Chatzot every night if one can. It then suggests that if one cannot do so every night, he should do so on Thursday nights, as a preparation for the Shabbat.

The practice of Tikkun Chatzot became much more widespread after the spread of coffee to Jewish societies.

== Service ==
Tikkun Chatzot is divided into two parts; Tikkun Rachel and Tikkun Leah, named for the two wives of the Patriarch Jacob. On days when Tachanun is not recited during daytime prayers, only Tikkun Leah is recited (although Sefardim do not recite Tikkun Chatzos at all on Shabbat and Yom Tov ).

The Tikkun Chatzot is an individual service; a minyan is not needed for performing it, although some have the custom to recite it with a minyan. At midnight, one sits on the ground or a low stool, takes off his shoes (non-leather shoes are permitted to be worn, as these are not halakhically considered shoes), and reads from the prayer book. Although the ideal time for Tikkun Chatzot is the hour following midnight, Tikkun Rachel may be said until a half (seasonal) hour before `alot hashachar/dawn, and Tikkun Leah until dawn. The Magen Avraham method (also held by Rebbe Nachman of Breslov) is that midnight is six clock hours after nightfall (appearance of 3 medium stars). The method held by Mishnah Berurah is twelve hours after noon (halfway between dawn and dusk). Another way to understand the ideal time for Tikkun Chatzot is at 12:00am midnight (this is another way to understand the Magen Avraham).

According to Siddur Beis Yaakov, by Rabbi Yaakov Emden, Psalm 102, the "Prayer of the afflicted," is read before reciting Tikkun Rachel. Afterwards, one begins the actual service by reciting the Viddui confession including Ashamnu, and then one reads Psalm 137, "By the rivers of Babylon," and Psalm 79, "A song of Asaph." Afterwards, verses from the book of Lamentations are read, followed by the kinnot, with customs varying among the communities, the general custom being to recite five or six kinnoth specifically composed for Tikkun Chatzos, some of which were composed by Rabbi Mosheh Alshich. The Tikkun Rachel service is concluded with the reading of Isaiah 52:2, "Shake thyself from the dust..." A shorter version is usually printed in Sephardic siddurim that does not include the "Prayer of the afflicted," and has fewer kinnos.

Tikkun Leah consists of various Psalms, and is recited after Tikkun Rachel, or alone on days when tachanun is omitted. The Psalms of Tikkun Leah are Psalm 24, 42, 43, 20, 24, 67, 111, 51, and 126. Psalms 20 and 51 are omitted when Tikkun Rachel is not said. A short prayer concludes the Tikkun. It is common to follow Tikkun Chatzot with learning Torah, in particular Patach Eliyahu or Mishnah. Some learn the last chapter of tractate Tamid. Many study the Zohar.
