= Yisroel Halpern =

Rabbi Yisroel Halpern, also known as Yisroel Karduner born circa 1850 (died 1918, the 9th of Cheshvan, 5619 on the Hebrew Calendar), was a Breslover Hasid who lived in Ottoman Palestine at the turn of the century.

== Biography ==
Born in Poland, Halpern was introduced to the teachings of Rebbe Nachman of Breslov when he came across a copy of Tikkun HaKlali (Rebbe Nachman's "General Remedy," a specific formulation of ten Psalms). Halpern's reading of this work inspired him to move to Ukraine, where he met Rabbi Nachman Goldstein (Rav of Tcherin) and studied under Reb Moshe Breslover. Many people were attracted to Breslover Hasidut after hearing him pray and sing with intense devotion. Several Breslover nigunim (melodies) are directly attributed to him. His best-known quote is: "There was someone [Rebbe Nachman] who called out 100 years ago, 'Never give up!' and we still hear that voice today."

== Aliyah to Israel ==
He immigrated to the Holy Land in the early 1900s and lived in Meron, Safed, and Tiberias.

In Tiberias he met a young Rabbi Yisroel Ber Odesser to whom he became a mentor. According to Rabbi Odesser, Halpern was named Karduner after the name of his town of birth. Rabbi Odesser describes him as pious and dedicated to prayer and study, respected even by those who has disdain for the Breslov way. He brought many other people closer to Breslov Hasidut through his intense devotions and beautiful songs.

Halpern lost his entire family in a plague in Tiberias, where he is also buried. His tombstone reads, "here is buried Rabbi Yisrael Breslover, the son of Rabbi Yehdua Leib."

== See also ==
- Rabbi Yisroel Ber Odesser’s recollections of Rabbi Yisroel Karduner — a bilingual Hebrew–English primary source about the article’s subject
- na-nah.info Stories about Rabbi Israel Karduner told by his disciple Rabbi Israel Ber Odesser
