= Patach Eliyahu =

Aramaic Kabbalistic discourse

Patach Eliyahu (פָּתַח אֵלִיָּהוּ, "Elijah opened"), also called Petihat Eliyahu HaNavi (פתיחת אליהו הנביא, "The Introduction of Elijah the Prophet"), is an Aramaic, Kabbalistic discourse from the introduction to Tikunei Zohar 17a. It is named after its initial words, where it is attributed to Elijah the Prophet. Considered a foundational text of Kabbalah, Patach Eliyahu is known for enumerating and summarizing the sefirot, corresponding them to parts of the body, and describing the infiniteness and uniqueness of God.

== Role in prayer ==
Most Sephardim (the exception are the Western Sephardim) recite Patach Eliyahu every morning as part of the order for the morning blessings before Shacharit, and some three times a day. Chassidim who pray according to the nusach of Arizal as compiled by Rabbi Shneur Zalman of Liadi recite it every Friday before the Minchah prayer as a preparation for Shabbat. Ashkenazim do not generally recite Patach Eliyahu in the course of prayer.

There are several purposes to reciting Patach Eliyahu. In general, it is read before a prayer to ensure that it is accepted on high in the merit of the study of the Zohar. It is also taught in the name of the Arizal that recital before every prayer helps to open the heart by meditating on the greatness of the Creator. It removes heavenly accusers, removes the forces of evil, and purifies the thoughts. Its recital reminds the petitioner that the purpose of prayer is not to change mind of Hashem, since He does not change, but to change the petitioner to become receptive to the flow of Divine blessing which is discussed in the passage. It is also used outside of regularly scheduled prayer, as-needed, for repentance, to benefit the souls of the dead, on building or dedicating a new home, and to release sparks of holiness in the world from being bound by the kelipot.

== English translation ==
Paragraph breaks and section headings are the translator's and are not present in the original text. Square brackets [] mark explanatory material inserted by the translator.

=== Opening ===
It is traditionally begun with saying

And may the grace of our L-rd our G-d be upon us, and may He establish our handiwork, yeah, our handiwork may He establish(Psalm 90:17).

And thus the prayer begins

Elijah opened and said:

Master of the worlds! You are One, but not in number. You are He Who is Highest of the High, Most Hidden of the Hidden; no thought can grasp You at all.

=== Introduction to the Sefirot ===
You are He Who dispatched ten rectifications and called them ten sefirot, with which to conduct the hidden worlds which are not revealed and the revealed worlds. And with them You conceal Yourself from humankind. And You are He Who binds them and unifies them, and to the extent that You are within them, anyone who will separate one among these ten sefirot from its fellows is considered as if he made a separation within You.

And these ten sefirot proceed according to their order: one long [the right axis] one short [the left axis] and one intermediate [the middle axis]. And You are He who conducts them, and there is no one who conducts You, neither above, nor below, nor from any side.

You arranged garments for them, from which fly souls to mankind. And You arranged many bodies for them, which are called "bodies" compared to "garments" which cover them and are named in this arrangement:

=== Anatomical arrangement of the Sefirot ===
Chesed [Loving-kindness], the right arm. Gevurah [Might, severity], the left arm.

Tiferet [Harmony], the torso.

Netzach [Victory] and Hod [Glory] the two thighs.

Yesod [Foundation, bonding], the culmination of the body, the sign of the Holy Covenant [the circumcision].

Malchut [Kingship], the mouth; she is called the Oral Torah.

Chochmah [Wisdom], the brain; that is inner thought. Binah [Understanding], the heart; with her, the heart understands. Of these two, it is written (Deuteronomy 29:28), "The hidden things belong to Havayah Elokeinu [the L‑rd our G‑d]."

Supernal Keter [Crown] - this is the Crown of Kingship [Keter of Malchut; alt. this Keter is Malchut], and regarding her it is said (Isaiah 46:10), "From the beginning [Keter] He tells the end [Malchut]." And this is the skull of the inner tefillin; that is the 45-Name [the Divine Name "Mah", spelled יו"ד ה"א וא"ו ה"א], which is the path of Atzilut.

=== The nature of the flow of Divine Life-Force ===
And this waters the Tree in its limbs and its branches, just as water waters the Tree and it grows itself with this watering.

Master of the Worlds! You are He Who is the Cause of causes and the Source of sources, Who waters the Tree with this flow. And this flow - it is like a soul to the body, because it is Life for the body.

And there is no image or likeness of You, inside or out.

And You created the Heavens and the earth, and sent out from them the sun, the moon, the stars [planets included] and the constellations. And on earth [You sent out], trees, grasses, the Garden of Eden, shrubs, beasts, animals, birds, fish and humankind - to make known through them the things on High, and how You conduct the things on High and Below, and how You make known to them the things on High from the things Below, and there is none that knows You at all.

=== Divine Unity and Uniqueness ===
And aside from You, there is no unity on High or Below. And You are acknowledged [as] the Cause of everything and the Master of everything.

And every sefirah has a known Name, and with these are the angels called. But You have no known Name, because You are He Who fills all Names. And You are the completion of them all. And as soon as You remove Yourself from them, all the Names remain like a body without a soul.

=== Unknowable transcendence and Divine Justice ===
You are He Who is Wise, but not with a knowable wisdom; You are He Who is Understanding, but not with a knowable understanding. You have no known place.

But rather, to make known Your Power and Might to humankind, and to show them how You conduct the world with Justice and Mercy, because there is Righteousness and Judgement according to the deeds of humankind.

Justice is Gevurah; Judgement, the righteous median Pillar; Holy Kingship, the righteous Scales, the two Balance-pans of Truth; the righteous Measure, the sign of the Holy Covenant. All is to show how You conduct the world, but not that You have a known righteousness that is just, nor a known judgement that is merciful, nor any of these attributes at all.

=== Conclusion ===
Blessed is Havayah forever, [alt. Draw Havayah down to the world] amen and amen!
