= Horowitz =

Horowitz (Hebrew: הוֹרוֹביץ, Yiddish: האָראָװיץ) is a Levitical Ashkenazi surname deriving from the Horowitz family, though it can also be a non-Jewish surname as well. The name is derived from the town of Hořovice, Bohemia. Other variants of the name include Harowitz, Harowicz, Harrowitz, Harrwitz, Harwitz, Horovitz, Horvitz, Horwicz, Horwitz, Hourwitz, Hurewicz, Hurwicz, Hurwitz, Gerovich, Gurovich, Gurevich, Gurvich, Gourevitch, Gurewitsch, Gorovits, Gorovitz, Orovitz, Orowitz, Orwitz and Urwitz.

== List of people with the surname Horowitz ==
=== Rabbis ===
- Aaron HaLevi ben Moses of Staroselye
- Abraham Horowitz, 16th-century rabbi
- Andrew Horowitz (1983) Warren, New Jersey
- Isaiah Horowitz (1555–1630), Prague-born rabbi of Germany, Austria, Prague and Palestine, Kabbalist, and author
- Levi Yitzchak Horowitz (1921–2009), Bostoner rabbi
- Mayer Alter Horowitz (born 1946), Bostoner rabbi in Har Nof
- Moses ha-Levi Hurwitz (d. 1820), Lithuanian rabbi
- Moshe Meshullam Halevy Horowitz (1832–1894), Galician rabbi
- Naftali Yehuda Horowitz, Bostoner rabbi of Boston
- Pinchas Horowitz (c.1731–1805), German rabbi and Talmudist
- Pinchas David Horowitz (1877–1931), First Bostoner rabbi, 1876–1941
- Shabbethai Horowitz (1590–1660), Volhynia-born Austrian rabbi and Talmudist, son of Isaiah Horowitz.
- Shabtai Sheftel Horowitz (1565–1619), rabbi and nephew of Isaiah Horowitz
- Shmelke of Nikolsburg (1726–1778), Galician-born Landesrabbiner of Moravia and kabbalist
- Shmuel Horowitz (1903–1973), compiler and publisher of Breslov books
- Yidele Horowitz (1905–1989), Hasidic rebbe of Dzikov
- Yosef Yoizel Hurwitz (1847-1919), Belarusian rosh yeshiva, Alter of Novardok

=== Other people ===
- Adam Horowitz (journalist), co-editor of Mondoweiss
- Adam Horowitz (born 1971), American TV show writer
- Alexandre Horowitz (1904–1982), Dutch technical engineer and inventor
- Andrew Horowitz (born 1983), American songwriter, producer and member of the band Tally Hall
- Anthony Horowitz (born 1955), British author and television scriptwriter
- Ariel Horowitz (born 1970), Israeli singer-songwriter
- Barry Horowitz (born 1959), American wrestler
- Ben Horowitz (born 1966), technology entrepreneur and investor
- Bernhard Horwitz (1807–1885), German and British chess master, one of the Berlin Pleiades
- Curly Howard (1903–1952), American comedian, birth name Jerome Horwitz
- Charles Horowitz (judge) (1905–1989), justice of the Washington Supreme Court
- Daniel Horowitz (born 1954), legal analyst and attorney
- David Horowitz (1939–2025), American writer and social activist
- David Horowitz (author) (1903–2002), founder of the United Israel World Union
- David Horowitz (consumer advocate) (1937–2019), American consumer advocate
- David Horowitz (economist) (1899–1979), first governor of the Bank of Israel
- Donald Horowitz (New Jersey lawyer) (born 1936), American lawyer
- Donald L. Horowitz (born 1939), American professor of law and political science
- Eugene Maurice Orowitz (1936–1991), American actor, better known by stage name Michael Landon
- Frances Degen Horowitz (1932–2021), American developmental psychologist
- Harry Horowitz (1889–1914), American underworld figure and a leader of the Lenox Avenue Gang in New York City
- Helen Lefkowitz Horowitz (born 1942), professor emerita of American studies and history at Smith College
- Herbert E. Horowitz (1930–2019), American diplomat
- Isaac Horowitz (1920–2005), scientist in automatic control theory, developed quantitative feedback theory
- Israel Albert Horowitz (1907–1973), American chess master
- Jerome Horwitz (1919–2012), American scientist
- Jordan Horowitz (born 1980), American film producer
- Joseph Horowitz (born 1948), American musicologist and cultural historian
- Leah Horowitz (1933–56), Israeli hurdler
- Michael C. Horowitz (born 1978), American writer and political scientist
- Michael D. Horowitz, American author
- Michael E. Horowitz (born 1962), American lawyer and Inspector General of the US Department of Justice
- Michael J. Horowitz (born 1964), American electrical engineer
- Moses Horowitz (1844–1910), Yiddish playwright
- Moe Howard (1897–1975), American comedian, birth name Moses Harry Horwitz
- Nitzan Horowitz (born 1965), Israeli journalist and politician
- Norman Horowitz (1915–2005), American geneticist and space biologist
- Paul Horowitz (born 1942), American physicist and electrical engineer
- Risa Horowitz (born 1970), Canadian visual and media artist
- Ryszard Horowitz (born 1939), Polish-born American photographer
- Scott J. Horowitz (born 1957), American astronaut
- Shalom Horowitz (1881–1956), Israeli lawyer, former head of S. Horowitz & Co., Israeli law firm
- Shemp Howard (1895–1955), American actor, birth name Samuel Horwitz
- Shmuel Hurwitz (1901–1999), Israeli agronomist
- Slawa Horowitz Duldig (1901–1975), Austrian-Australian inventor, artist, interior designer and teacher
- Tamara Horowitz (1950–2000), American philosopher
- Vladimir Horowitz (1903–1989), Russian-American classical pianist
- Wayne Horowitz, archeologist
- Winona Ryder (born 1971), American actress, birth name Winona Horowitz
- Jonty Hurwitz (born 1969), South African artist and entrepreneur
- Arthur Horwich (born 1951), American biologist and Sterling Professor of Genetics and Pediatrics at the Yale School of Medicine

== See also ==
- Harrwitz, Harwicz, Harwitz, Horovitz, Horvitz, Horowicz, Horowitz, Horwitz, Hourwitz, Hurewicz, Hurewitz, Hurvits, Hurwicz, Hurvitz, Hurwitz
- Gourevitch, Gurovich, Gurevich/Gurevičius, Gurovich, Gurvich/Gurvičius, Gurwich, Gurwitsch, Gurevitch, Gurewitsch, Gurwitch, Gorovits, Gorovitz
- Kurvitz, Orovitz/Orowitz/Orwitz/Orwicz/Urwicz/Urwitz
