= Horowicz =

Horowicz is a Polish spelling of the Jewish surname Horowitz. Notable people with the surname include:

- Caio Horowicz (born 1996), Brazilian actor
- David Ish-Horowicz (1948–2024), British scientist

== See also ==
- Harrwitz, Harwicz, Harwitz, Horovitz, Horvitz, Horowicz, Horowitz, Horwitz, Hourwitz, Hurewicz, Hurewitz, Hurvits, Hurwicz, Hurvitz, Hurwitz
- Gourevitch, Gurovich, Gurevich, Gurovich, Gurvich, Gurwich, Gurwitsch, Gurevitch, Gurewitsch, Gurwitch, Gorovits, Gorovitz
- Kurvitz, Orovitz/Orowitz/Orwitz/Orwicz/Urwicz/Urwitz
