= Hurwitz =

Surname list

Hurwitz is one of the variants of a surname of Ashkenazi Jewish origin (for historical background see the Horowitz page). Notable people with the surname include:

- Adolf Hurwitz (1859–1919), German mathematician
- Andrew D. Hurwitz (born 1947), American judge
- David Hurwitz (disambiguation), multiple people
- Edward Hurwitz (born 1931), American diplomat
- Emanuel Hurwitz (1919–2006), British violinist
- Gregg Hurwitz, American novelist
- Henry Hurwitz Jr. (1918–1992), nuclear physicist
- Hyman Hurwitz (1770–1844), professor of Hebrew in England
- Jake Hurwitz (born 1985), American comedian, writer and actor
- Jerard Hurwitz (1928–2019), American biochemist
- Johanna Hurwitz (born 1937), American children's author
- Jon Hurwitz (born 1977), American screenwriter
- Jonty Hurwitz (born 1969), electrical engineer and sculptor
- Justin Hurwitz (born 1985), American composer
- Lazar Lipman Hurwitz (1815–1852), editor and writer
- Leo Hurwitz (1909–1991), American documentary film maker
- Moses ha-Levi Hurwitz (d. 1820), Lithuanian rabbi
- Mitchell Hurwitz, American television writer and producer
- Shelley Hurwitz, American biostatistician
- Shmuel Hurwitz, Israeli agronomist
- Shmuel Hurvits, Yiddish poet
- T. Alan Hurwitz (born 1942), 10th president of Gallaudet University
- William Hurwitz, American pain management physician
- Yosef Yozel Horwitz (1849–1919), the Alter of Navordok
- Zvi Harry Hurwitz, (1924–2008) Israeli diplomat, public servant and biographer

== Fictional characters ==
- Lieutenant Hurwitz, a minor character in the movie Airplane!

== See also ==
- Harowitz, Harowicz, Harrwitz, Harwitz, Horovitz, Horvitz, Horowitz, Horwicz, Horwitz, Hourwitz, Hurewicz, Hurewitz, Hurvits, Hurwicz, Hurvitz, Hurwitz
- Gourevitch, Gurovich, Gurevich, Gurovich, Gurvich, Gurwich, Gurwitsch, Gurevitch, Gurewitsch, Gurwitch, Gorovits, Gorovitz
- Kurvitz
- Orovitz/Orowitz/Orwitz/Orwicz/Urvits/Urvitz/Urwicz/Urwitz
