= Horwitz =

Horwitz is a surname, current among Ashkenazi Jews. It is derived from the Yiddish pronunciation of the name of the town of Hořovice in Bohemia. For detailed historical background see the Horowitz page.

Notable people with the surname include:

- Alan Horwitz (born 1944), American businessman
- Arnold Horwitz (later Arnold Horween), American football player
- Bella Horwitz, 18th century Bohemian writer
- Bernhard Horwitz (1807-1885), German chess player
- Brian Horwitz (born 1982), American baseball player
- Jacob H. Horwitz (1892–1992), American businessman, philanthropist and fashion innovator
- Jerome Lester Horwitz (1903–1952), American actor a.k.a. Curly Howard, of the Three Stooges
- David Horwitz (born 1994), Australian rugby player
- Dominique Horwitz (born 1957), French actor and singer
- Howard Horwitz (1918 – 1976), American television producer
- Jay Horwitz (born 1945), American baseball executive
- Kai Horwitz (born 1998), Chilean alpine skier
- Maksymilian Horwitz, aka Henryk Walecki (1877–1937), Polish communist
- Morton Horwitz (born 1938), legal historian and professor
- Moses Harry Horwitz, American actor a.k.a. Moe Howard, of the Three Stooges
- Phineas Jonathan Horwitz (1822–1904), surgeon and United States Naval officer
- Ralph Horwitz (later Ralph Horween), American football player
- Ronald Horwitz (born 1934), known as Ronald Harwood, South African-born British author, playwright, and screenwriter
- Samuel Horwitz, American actor a.k.a. Shemp Howard, of the Three Stooges
- Spencer Horwitz (born 1997), American baseball player
- Steven Horwitz (born 1964), American economist
- Susan B. Horwitz (1955–2014), American computer scientist
- Susan Band Horwitz, American biochemist
- Tony Horwitz (1958–2019), American journalist
- William Horwitz (1918–2006), American analytical chemist
- Yosef Yozel Horwitz, rabbi

== See also ==
- Harrwitz, Harwicz, Harwitz, Horovitz, Horvitz, Horowicz, Horowitz, Horwitz, Hourwitz, Hurewicz, Hurewitz, Hurvits, Hurwicz, Hurvitz, Hurwitz
- Gourevitch, Gurovich, Gurevich/Gurevičius, Gurovich, Gurvich, Gurwich, Gurwitsch, Gurevitch, Gurewitsch, Gurwitch, Gorovits, Gorovitz
- Kurvitz, Orovitz/Orowitz/Orwitz/Orwicz/Urwicz/Urwitz
- Horwitz Publications, an Australian publisher
- Louisa Gross Horwitz Prize
