= Gurvich =

Gurvich, Gurovich, Gurwich, Gurwitch, Gurwitsch, Gurevich, or Gourevitch is a Yiddish surname, a Russian form of the surname "Horowitz", see the latter article about its etymology.

The surname may refer to:

== Gurvich ==
- Abram Gurvich (1897–1962), Russian chess composer
- José Gurvich (1927–1974), Lithuanian-Uruguayan plastic artist
- Alexander Gurwitsch (1874–1954), Russian biologist
- Aleksandr Gurevich (1930–2023), Russian physicist
- Aron Gurevich (1924–2006), Russian medievalist
- Aron Gurwitsch (1901–1973), Lithuanian-American philosopher
- Georges Gurvitch (1894–1965), Russian-French sociologist
- Liubov Gurevich (1866–1940), Russian editor, translator, author, and critic
- Leib Gurwicz (1906–1982), Orthodox rabbi
- Naum Gurvich, Soviet-Jewish inventor of defibrillator
- Fedor Dan (born Gurvich) (1871–1949), Russian revolutionary and Menshevik

== Gurevich ==
- Aharon Gurevich, Russian rabbi
- Anatoly Gurevich Soviet spy
- Boris Maksovich Gurevich (1931–1995), Soviet wrestler
- Boris Michail Gurevich (1937–2020), Soviet wrestler
- David Gurevich (b. 1951), Russian-American writer
- Dmitry Gurevich (b. 1956), Russian-American chess grandmaster
- Maria Gurevich (born 1964), Israeli puppet designer
- Michelle Gurevich, Canadian singer of Russian descent
- Mikhail Gurevich (chess player) (b. 1959), Ukrainian chess grandmaster
- Mikhail Gurevich (aircraft designer) (1893–1976), Soviet aircraft designer
- Mikhail Gurevich (psychiatrist) (1878–1953), Soviet psychiatrist
- Valery Solomonovich Gurevich, vice-chairman of Russia's Jewish Autonomous Oblast
- Yuri Gurevich, American computer scientist and mathematician
- Jessica Gurevitch, American plant ecologist

== Gurwitch ==
- Annabelle Gurwitch (born 1961), American actress
- Janet Gurwitch (born 1954), founder of Gurwitch Products

== Gurevičius, Gurvičius ==
Gurevičius (feminine forms: by father: Gurevičaitė, Gurevičiūte, by husband: Gurevičienė) are the Lithuanized forms of the surname Gurevich.
Gurvičius (feminine forms: by father: Gurvičaitė, Gurvičiūte, by husband: Gurvičienė) are the Lithuanized forms of the surname Gurvich.

- Algirdas Gurevičius, Lithuanian adventurer, touring cyclist, filmmaker, vlogger, farmer, programmer
- Ona Gurvičaitė, also Gurvičiūte, Jewish Lithuanian table tennis champion
- Riva Gurvičaite, Lithianian scientist who worked in the Marie Curie lab
- Zusmanas Gurvičius, birth name of José Gurvich

== Other ==
- Alexander Gurwitsch
- Arno David Gurewitsch
- David Silberman Gurovich
- Philip Gourevitch

== See also ==
- Harrwitz, Harwicz, Harwitz, Horovitz, Horvitz, Horowicz, Horowitz, Horwitz, Hourwitz, Hurewicz, Hurewitz, Hurvits, Hurwicz, Hurvitz, Hurwitz
- Gourevitch, Gurovich, Gurevich/Gurevičius, Gurovich, Gurvich/Gurvičius, Gurwich, Gurwitsch, Gurevitch, Gurewitsch, Gurwitch, Gorovits, Gorovitz
- Kurvitz, Orovitz/Orowitz/Orwitz/Orwicz/Urwicz/Urwitz
