= Hurvitz =

Hurvitz is a surname. Notable people with the surname include:

- Elazar Hurvitz, academic scholar in Talmudic studies
- Eliyahu "Eli" Hurvitz (born 1932), Israeli industrialist
- Yair Hurvitz (1941–88), Israeli poet
- Yigal Hurvitz (1918–94), Israeli politician

== See also ==
- Harowitz, Harowicz, Harrwitz, Harwitz, Horovitz, Horvitz, Horowitz, Horwicz, Horwitz, Hourwitz, Hurewicz, Hurwicz, Hurwitz
- Gerovich, Gurovich, Gurevich, Gurvich, Gourevitch, Gurewitsch, Gorovits, Gorovitz
- Orovitz/Orowitz/Orwitz/Orwicz/Urvits/Urvitz/Urwicz/Urwitz
