= Horovitz =

Horovitz is one of the variants of a surname originating in the Jewish community of Bohemia – bearers of that surname apparently migrated in the Middle Ages from a small town Hořovice in Bohemia (today the Czech Republic). For detailed historical background see the Horowitz page. It can also be a non-Jewish surname as well.

It may refer to:

- Ad-Rock (born 1966), stage name of Adam Horovitz of the Beastie Boys
- Adam Horovitz (poet) (born 1971), British poet
- Béla Horovitz (1898–1955), Hungarian-born British publisher
- David Horovitz (born 1962), author and political commentator
- Frances Horovitz (1938–1983) English poet and broadcaster
- Gillian Horovitz (born 1955), English long-distance runner
- Hannah Horovitz (1936–2010), British classical music promoter
- Israel Horovitz (1939–2020), American playwright and screenwriter, father of Adam and Rachael Horovitz
- Josef Horovitz (1874–1931), German orientalist
- Joseph Horovitz (1926–2022), Austrian-English composer
- Michael Horovitz (1935–2021), English poet
- Rachael Horovitz (born 1962), American film producer, sister of Adam Horovitz
- Robert Horovitz (born 1947), medical biologist and Nobel Prize winner

== See also ==
- Harrwitz, Harwicz, Harwitz, Horovitz, Horvitz, Horowicz, Horowitz, Horwitz, Hourwitz, Hurewicz, Hurewitz, Hurvits, Hurwicz, Hurvitz, Hurwitz
- Gourevitch, Gurovich, Gurevich, Gurovich, Gurvich, Gurwich, Gurwitsch, Gurevitch, Gurewitsch, Gurwitch, Gorovits, Gorovitz
- Kurvitz, Orovitz/Orowitz/Orwitz/Orwicz/Urwicz/Urwitz
