= Hořovice =

Town in Central Bohemian Region, Czech Republic

- Town
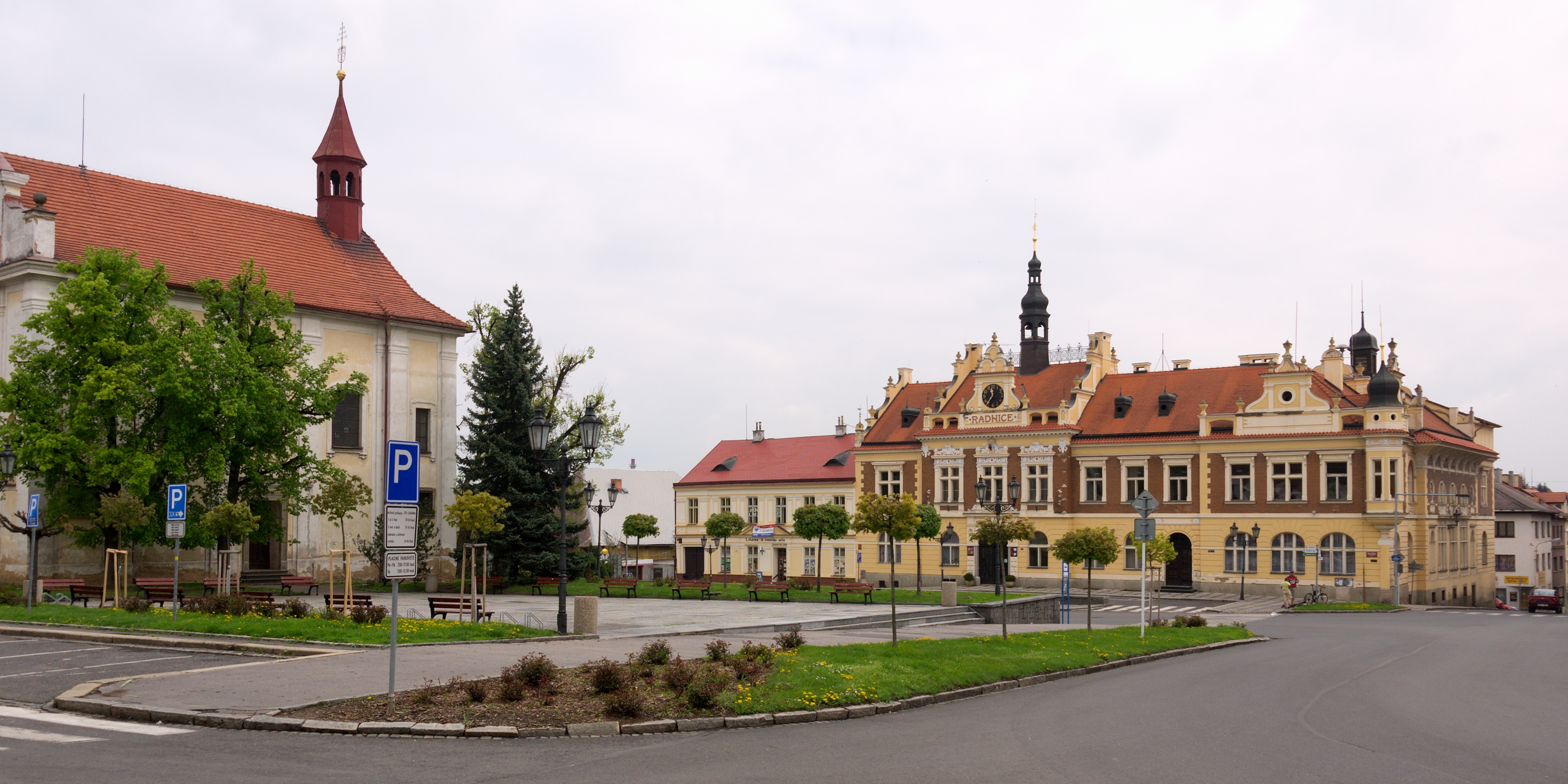
- Palackého náměstí with the town hall and Church of the Holy Trinity

- Flag Coat of arms

- Location in the Czech Republic
- Coordinates: 49°50′10″N 13°54′18″E
- Country: Czech Republic
- Region: Central Bohemian
- District: Beroun
- First mentioned: 1322

Government
  - Mayor: Věra Veverková

Area
  - Total: 9.55 km^{2} (3.69 sq mi)
- Elevation: 375 m (1,230 ft)

Population (2026-01-01)
  - Total: 8,245
  - Density: 863/km^{2} (2,240/sq mi)
- Time zone: UTC+1 (CET)
  - Summer (DST): UTC+2 (CEST)
- Postal code: 268 01
- Website: www.mesto-horovice.eu

Hořovice (Czech pronunciation: [ˈɦor̝ovɪtsɛ]; German: Horschowitz, Horowitz) is a town in Beroun District in the Central Bohemian Region of the Czech Republic. It has about 8,200 inhabitants. The town is located on the stream Červený potok in the Hořovice Uplands.

Hořovice was founded in the first half of the 14th century. The main landmark of the town is the Hořovice Castle, which is protected as a national cultural monument.

== Etymology ==
The name was derived either from the personal name Hoř or from the surname Hora, meaning "the village of Hoř's/Hora's people".

== Geography ==
Hořovice is located about 18 kilometres (11 mi) southwest of Beroun and 40 km (25 mi) southwest of Prague. It lies in the Hořovice Uplands. The highest point is at 471 m (1,545 ft) above sea level. The stream Červený potok flows through the town.

== History ==
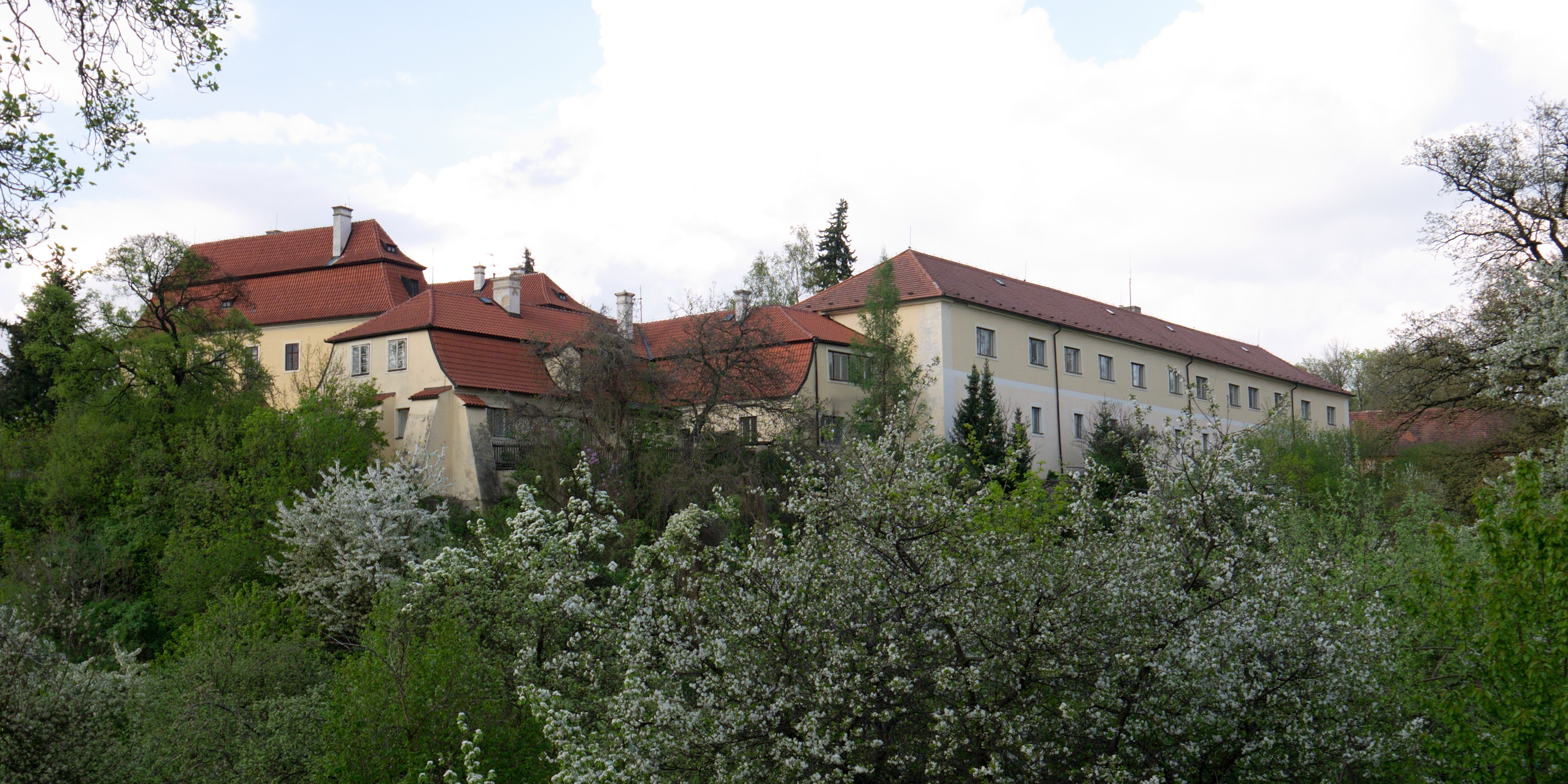
Hořovice Castle – Starý zámek

Hořovice was founded between 1303 and 1322, however archaeological excavations proves existence of an early settlement already in the 10th century. There was a trading post, later rebuilt and expanded into a castle in the Gothic style (the so-called Starý zámek).

Due to frequent fires in the town (in 1540, 1590, 1624, 1639, 1690 and 1694) and reconstructions, almost all documents of Gothic and Renaissance architecture were destroyed.

The construction of the Bohemian Western Railway in around 1862 contributed to the development of industry. Gradually, the traditional handicraft nail production disappeared, and was replaced by machine production in the newly established factories. Thanks to the rich deposits in the area, iron ore has been processed here since the 14th century. Cast iron has made the area famous since the 18th century. Stoves, grilles, railings, reliefs and busts were cast in the local foundries.

=== Jewish legacy ===
One of the world's most common Jewish surnames, Horovitz/Horowitz/Gurvich/Hurwicz/Hurwitz/Horvitz, etc., originates from the town of Hořovice, which during the late Middle Ages had one of the most substantial Jewish populations in the Kingdom of Bohemia. Rabbis and communal leaders such as Isaiah Horowitz or Shabtai Sheftel Horowitz traced their lineage from this town.

== Demographics ==
Historical population

Year	Pop.	±%
1869	3,704	—
1880	4,089	+10.4%
1890	4,231	+3.5%
1900	4,325	+2.2%
1910	4,829	+11.7%

Year	Pop.	±%
1921	4,679	−3.1%
1930	4,818	+3.0%
1950	4,472	−7.2%
1961	5,238	+17.1%
1970	5,675	+8.3%

Year	Pop.	±%
1980	5,619	−1.0%
1991	6,395	+13.8%
2001	6,374	−0.3%
2011	6,951	+9.1%
2021	6,835	−1.7%

Source: Censuses

== Transport ==
Hořovice is located on the railway line Prague–Klatovy via Plzeň.

== Sights ==
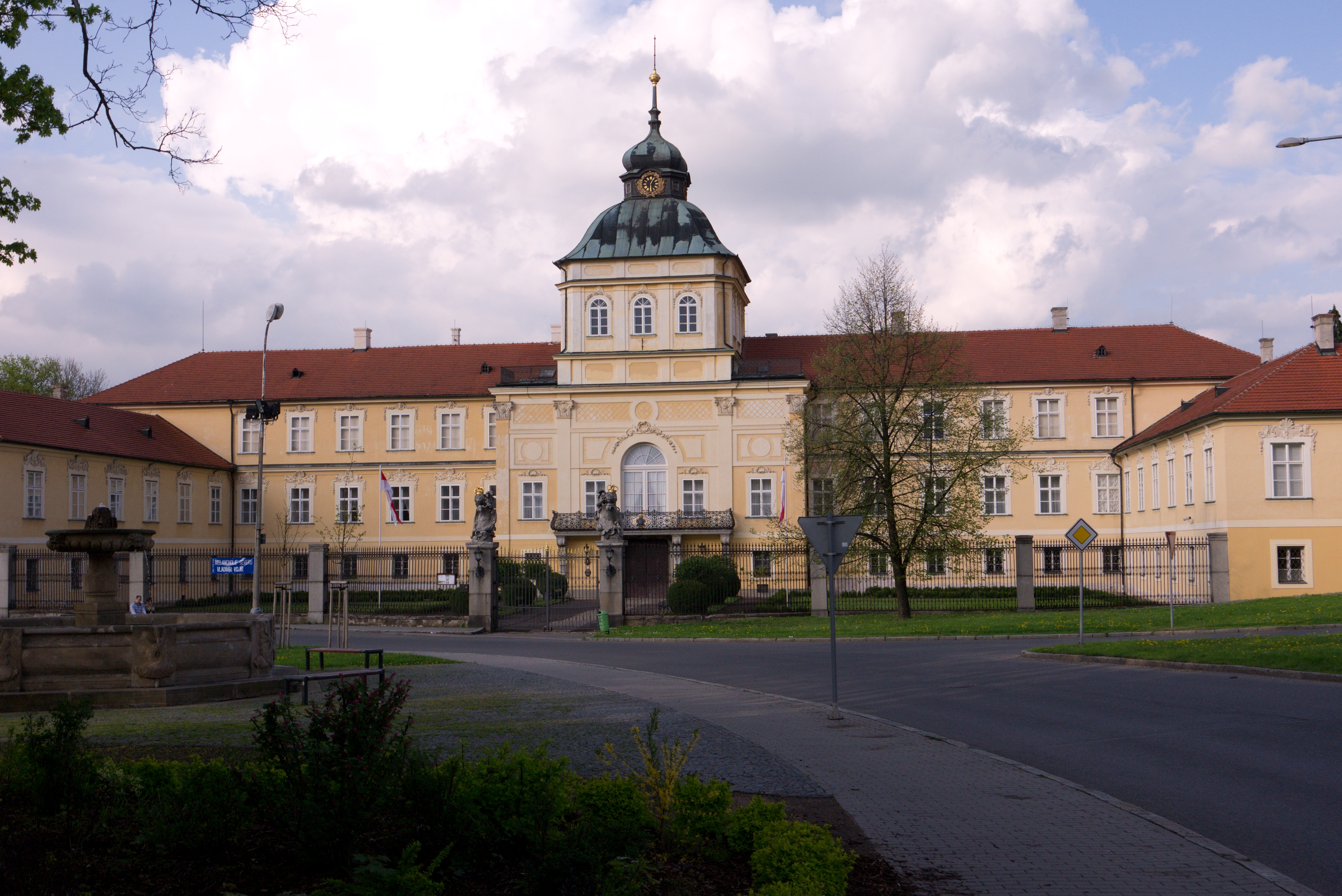
Hořovice Castle – Nový zámek

Hořovice is known for the Hořovice Castle, protected as a national cultural monument. The so-called Nový zámek ('new castle') was built in 1680–1709. It contains the adjacent French-English park and it is open to the public. The Starý zámek ('old castle') houses the Police of the Czech Republic, the Municipal Library and the Information Centre, and offices of a family centre and of the Museum of the Bohemian Karst. An art gallery and exposition of Hořovice Region Museum are also located there.

The second historic centre is the square Palackého náměstí with its surroundings. The Church of the Holy Trinity was built in the Baroque style in 1674. The town hall is a Neo-Renaissance building from 1905.

The former synagogue in Hořovice was built in 1903. The building survived World War II, but after the Jewish population of Hořovice disappeared as a result of the Holocaust, it lost its purpose. From 1947, it has served as a prayerhouse of the Evangelical Church of Czech Brethren.

== Notable people ==
- Elizabeth of Görlitz (1390–1451), Duchess of Luxemburg
- Josel of Rosheim (1480–1554), advocate of the German Jews; lived here
- Josef Labor (1842–1924), musician
- Alfred Seifert (1850–1901), Czech-German painter; grew up here
- Jaroslav Panuška (1872–1958), painter and illustrator
- Otto Hönigschmid (1878–1945), chemist
- Libor Capalini (born 1973), modern pentathlete, Olympic medalist
- Jan Prušinovský (born 1979), director and screenwriter
- Jiří Fischer (born 1980), ice hockey player
- Jan Skopeček (born 1980), politician
- Petr Koukal (born 1985), badminton player

== Twin towns – sister cities ==
Hořovice is twinned with:

- Gau-Algesheim, Germany
