= Music Without Musicians =

Museum exhibition in the Czech Republic

- Hudba bez hudebníků
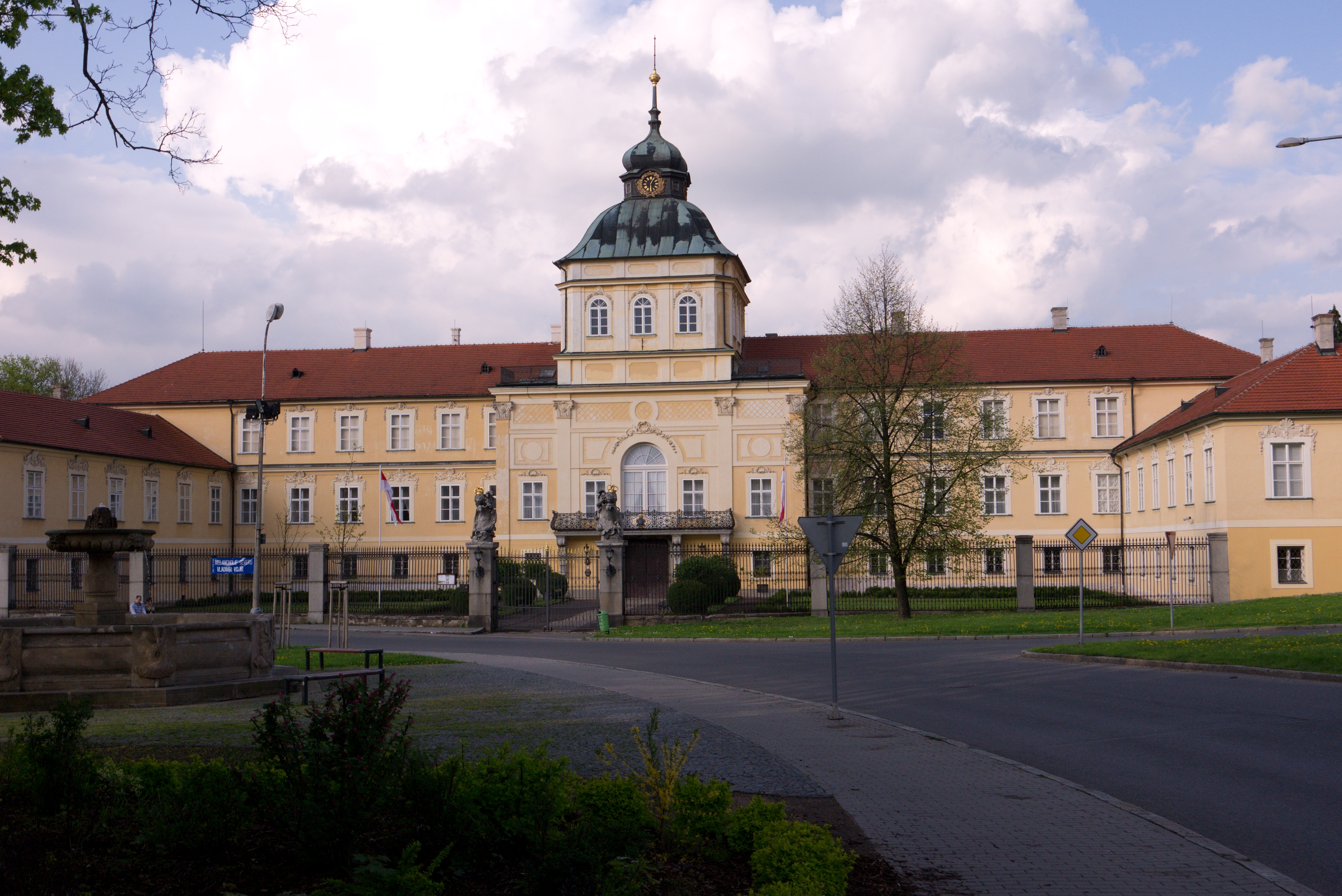
- Hořovice Castle

- Location within Czech Republic
- Location: Vrbnovská 22, Hořovice
- Coordinates: 49°50′19.36″N 13°54′33.51″E
- Type: Music instruments exposition
- Collections: Mechanical music instruments
- Owner: Czech Music Museum
- Website: www.zamek-horovice.cz

Music Without Musicians – music boxes and juke boxes (Czech: Hudba bez hudebníků – hrací strojky a hudební automaty) was an exposition in Hořovice Castle in the Central Bohemian Region, Czech Republic. It was dedicated to music instruments that need no musicians to produce music.

== Collection ==
The exposition showed a collection of mechanical music instruments from the 18th, 19th and 20th century. The collection consisted of jukeboxes, music boxes, mechanical paintings (tableaux animés), barrel organs, polyphons, orchestrions and more different instruments.

== Background ==
The exposition was situated in the former castle kitchen of Hořovice Castle. It was part of the Czech Music Museum at Prague that provided the collection to the museum.

== See also ==
- List of museums in the Czech Republic
- List of music museums
