= David Hurwitz =

David Hurwitz may refer to:

- David Hurwitz (music critic) (born 1961), classical music critic and author
- David Hurwitz (physician) (1905–1992), physician, educator and researcher

== See also ==
- David Horowitz (disambiguation)
