= Shlah =

Shlah may refer to:

- Shlach, Torah portion
- Shelah HaKadosh, Rabbi Isaiah Horowitz
