= Orovitz =

Orovitz, Orowitz, Orwitz, Orwicz, Urvitz, Urwitz, Urwicz, Urvits is an Ashkenazi Jewish surname, a form of the Yiddish surname "Horowitz", see the latter article about its etymology. Notable people with the surname include:

== O ==
- Abraham Orovitz, birth name of Vincent Sherman, American actor and film director
- Eugene Maurice Orowitz, birth name of Michael Landon, American actor and filmmaker
- Richard Joseph Orwitz, birth name of Richard Howard, American poet, literary critic, essayist, teacher, and translator

== U ==
- David Urwitz, Swedish singer and musician
- Tomás Ocaña Urwitz, Spanish investigative journalist

== See also ==
- Harowitz, Harowicz, Harrwitz, Harwitz, Horovitz, Horvitz, Horowitz, Horwicz, Horwitz, Hourwitz, Hurewicz, Hurwicz, Hurwitz
- Gerovich, Gurovich, Gurevich, Gurvich, Gourevitch, Gurewitsch, Gorovits, Gorovitz
- Orovitz/Orowitz/Orwitz/Orwicz/Urvits/Urvitz/Urwicz/Urwitz
