= Gourevitch =

Gourevitch is a surname. Notable people with the surname include:

- Boris Gourevitch (1889–1964), Russian author and pacifist
- Danielle Gourevitch (1941–2021), French medical historian and classicist
- Jean-Paul Gourévitch (born 1941). French essayist
- Peter Gourevitch (born 1943), American political scientist
- Philip Gourevitch (born 1961), American author and journalist
- Raissa Gourevitch (born 1984), Russian tennis player
- Victor Gourevitch (1925–2020), American philosopher

== See also ==
- Harowitz, Harowicz, Harrwitz, Harwitz, Horovitz, Horvitz, Horowitz, Horwicz, Horwitz, Hourwitz, Hurewicz, Hurwicz, Hurwitz
- Gerovich, Gurovich, Gurevich, Gurvich, Gourevitch, Gurewitsch, Gorovits, Gorovitz
- Orovitz/Orowitz/Orwitz/Orwicz/Urvits/Urvitz/Urwicz/Urwitz
