= Abraham ben Benjamin Ze'ev Brisker =

Polish-Lithuanian Jewish writer

Abraham ben Benjamin Ze'ev Brisker (Hebrew: אברהם בן בנימן זאב; died 1700) was a Polish-Lithuanian Jewish writer.

== Biography ==
Following the expulsion of Jews from Lithuania in 1655, Abraham moved to Vienna, where he studied under the kabbalist Rabbi Shabtai Sheftel Horowitz. On the expulsion of the Jews from that city in 1670, he went to Brest-Litovsk, where he married a daughter of Elijah Lipschütz and continued his studies under Rabbi Mordecai Guenzburg and Rabbi Ẓevi Hirsch. Abraham represented Brest-Litovsk at the 1683 meeting of the Council of the Lands in Lublin.

Despite expressing a desire to emigrate to the Holy Land, this intention was never realized. This was indicated in his work Zera Avraham, where he described his tribulations, including his difficulties in his studies as well as his wanderings. The book also included sermons concerning the link "between the weekly portions, and other verses, Midrashim and commentaries according to literal interpretation".

== Work ==
Abraham was the author of the following works:

- Asarah Ma'amarot [Ten Words]. Frankfurt-on-the-Oder. 1680. On the ten divine words which, according to Pirkei Avot, were used in the creation of the world.
- Zeʾēv, Avrāhām Ben-Binyāmîn (1685). Zera' Avraham [Abraham's Seed]. Sulzbach. On the connections between the weekly Torah portions.
- Perush 'al 'Eser 'Atarot [Commentary on the Ten Crowns]. Frankfurt-on-the-Oder. 1698. A kabbalistic treatise on the Ten Commandments.
