= David Horowitz (disambiguation) =

David Horowitz (also spelled Horovitz, Horovitch, Horvitz or Hurwitz) may refer to:

- David Horowitz (1899–1979), Galicia-born Israeli economist and first governor of the Bank of Israel
- David Horowitz (1903–2002), founder of the U.S. based organization United Israel World Union
- David Hurwitz (1905–1992), American physician, educator and researcher
- David Horowitz (1937–2019), American consumer advocate
- David Horowitz (1939–2025), American conservative activist and political writer
- David Horovitch (born 1945), British film, TV and stage actor
- David Hurwitz (born 1961), American classical music critic and author
- David Horovitz (born 1962), British-born Israeli journalist
- David Horvitz (born 1974), American multi artist
