= Kõrvits =

Estonian-language surname

Kõrvits is an Estonian surname, meaning pumpkin. Notable people with the surname include:

- Henry Kõrvits, Estonian rapper, record producer and actor
- Harry Kõrvits, Estonian actor and musician
- Tõnu Kõrvits, Estonian composer
- Toomas Kõrvits, Estonian singer and furniture designer

== See also ==
- Kurvitz
- Kurvits
