= Hurwicz =

Hurwicz (Hebrew: הורביץ), (Russian: Гурвич) is a surname. Notable people with the surname include:

- Leonid "Leo" Hurwicz (1917–2008), Jewish Russian-American economist and mathematician
- Angelika Hurwicz (1922–1999), German actress and theatre director

== See also ==
- Harowitz, Harowicz, Harrwitz, Harwitz, Horovitz, Horvitz, Horowitz, Horwicz, Horwitz, Hourwitz, Hurewicz, Hurwicz, Hurwitz
- Gerovich, Gurovich, Gurevich, Gurvich, Gourevitch, Gurewitsch, Gorovits, Gorovitz
- Orovitz/Orowitz/Orwitz/Orwicz/Urvits/Urvitz/Urwicz/Urwitz
