= Henry Wallman =

American mathematician

Henry "Hank" Wallman (1915–1992) was an American mathematician, known for his work in lattice theory, dimension theory, topology, and electronic circuit design.

A native of Brooklyn and a 1933 graduate of Brooklyn College, Wallman received his Ph.D. in mathematics from Princeton University in 1937, under the supervision of Solomon Lefschetz and became a faculty member at the Massachusetts Institute of Technology, where he was associated with the Radiation Laboratory. During World War II he did classified work at MIT, possibly involving radar. In 1948, he left MIT to become a professor of electrotechnics at the Chalmers University of Technology in Gothenburg, Sweden, which awarded him the Chalmers medal in 1980 and where he eventually retired. In 1950 he was elected as a foreign member to the Swedish Royal Academy. He was elected a member of the Royal Swedish Academy of Engineering Sciences in 1960 and of the Royal Swedish Academy of Engineering Sciences in 1970.

The disjunction property of Wallman is named after Wallman, as is the Wallman compactification, and he co-authored an important monograph on dimension theory with Witold Hurewicz. Wallman was also a radio enthusiast, and in the postwar period co-authored a book comprehensively documenting what was known at the time about vacuum tube amplification technology, including new developments such as showing how the central limit theorem could be used to describe the rise time of cascaded circuits. At Chalmers, Wallman helped build the Electronic Differential Analyser, an early example of an analog computer, and performed pioneering research in biomedical engineering combining video displays with X-ray imaging.
