= Yehiel Michel Epstein Ashkenazi =

17th-century Jewish writer

Rabbi Yehiel Michel Epstein Ashkenazi

Personal life
- Parent: Avraham (father)
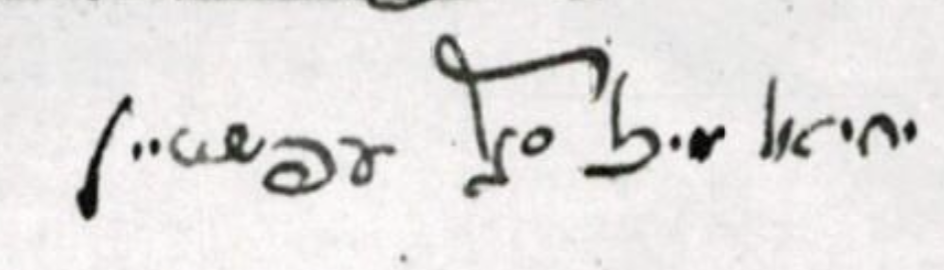
- Signature

Religious life
- Religion: Judaism

Yehiel Michel ben Avraham Epstein Ashkenazi (Hebrew: יחיאל מיכל בן אברהם עפשטיין אשכנזי), also known as Jeḥiel Michel Segal Epstein (Hebrew: יחיאל מיכל סג"ל עפשטיין) was a Sabbatean writer and ethicist who lived in the seventeenth century. He refers to himself as an Ashkenazic Jew. He was the son-in-law of a certain rabbinical judge named "Yom-Tov Oppenheim".

In 1693, Yehiel Michel published Ḳiẓẓur Shnei Luḥot haBrit (Hebrew: קיצור שני לחות הברית), also known as Kitzur Shelah (Hebrew: קיצור של"ה), written after the style of Isaiah Horowitz's Shnei Luḥot haBrit (1648). A second edition, with numerous additions, and containing extracts from current ethical works, was published three years later (Fürth, 1696) and a third edition with even more material was published in Amsterdam (1723). Nothing is known of his career. Jacob Emden publicized the Sabbatean nature of the work in Torat Kinna'ot (1752) and explicit references to Zevi were excised from subsequent editions. The Kitzur Shelah is notable for introducing many mystical and liturgical traditions, always citing them, however, to manuscripts supposedly in the author's possession.

Yehiel Michel also published Yiddish works, including Derekh ha-yashar le-olam haba, and has been called a "champion of Yiddish".
