= Aaron Abraham ben Baruch Simeon ha-Levi =

Sixteenth-century rabbi

Aaron Abraham ben Baruch Simeon ha-Levi was a kabbalist, born in the first quarter of the sixteenth century. He published a small kabbalistic work, Iggeret ha-Ṭe'amim (Letter on the Accents), about the middle of the century, in which each accent and its specific name are explained as containing references to both the Ten Sefirot and the people of Israel. Upon this work Shabbethai Sheftel ben Akiba Hurwitz, kabbalist and physician at Prague, wrote in 1612 a voluminous commentary, Shefa' Ṭal, asserting in the introduction (p. 13) that R. Aaron was one of the greatest masters of the Kabbalah, and that his work contained the most profound secrets which he (Hurwitz) wished to disclose. But in reality it contains only kabbalistic trifles which attempt to show that the solution of the mystery of the Ten Sefirot is indicated in the names of the accents (ṭe'amim).
