= Lazar Lipman Hurwitz =

Russian Jewish editor and writer

- Born: 1815
- Died: 21 October 1852 (aged 36–37); Vilna, Vilna Governorate, Russian Empire
- Occupations: Editor, writer

Lazar Lipman Hurwitz (Hebrew: אליעזר ליפמאן בן חיים הורוויץ, romanized: Eliʻezer Lipman ben Ḥayyim Hurṿits; 1815 – 21 October 1852) was a Russian Jewish editor and writer.

== Biography ==
Hurwitz was born in 1815, the grandson of Rabbi Moses ben Isaac ha-Levi Hurwitz of Krozh. He acted for many years as private instructor at Vilna, and then became teacher in a public school at Riga. Later he was appointed by the government headmaster in the rabbinical school of Vilna.

With S. J. Fuenn, Hurwitz issued a periodical entitled Pirḥe tsafon, devoted to Jewish history, literature, and exegesis; the first number appeared in 1841, the second in 1844. He was also the author of Ḥaḳirot 'al Sefer Iyyob, studies on Job, published in the second volume of Jost's Tsiyyon (1842), and Korot toledot melekhet ha-shir veha-melitsah, a history of ancient Jewish poetry, published in Pirḥe tsafon.
