= Kurvits =

Estonian family name

Origin
- Region of origin: Estonia

Kurvits is an Estonian language surname, meaning in Estonian woodcock, and may refer to:

- Ado Kurvits (1897–1958), Estonian Communist politician
- Ants Kurvits (1887–1943), Estonian military personnel
- Juhan Kurvits (1895–1939), Estonian politician

== See also ==
- Kõrvits
- Kurvitz
