= Horvitz =

Horvitz is one of the variants of an Ashkenazi Jewish surname (for historical background see the Horowitz page). It is also a non Jewish surname as well.

It may refer to:

- Daniel G. Horvitz (1921–2008), statistician
- David Horvitz (born ca 1982), artist
- H. Robert Horvitz (born 1947), biologist known for his work on c. elegans
- Richard Horvitz (born 1966), actor, voice actor, and comedian
- Wayne Horvitz (born 1955), composer and keyboardist
- Wayne L. Horvitz (1920–2009), labor negotiator

== See also ==
- Harowitz, Harowicz, Harrwitz, Harwitz, Horovitz, Horvitz, Horowitz, Horwicz, Horwitz, Hourwitz, Hurewicz, Hurwicz, Hurwitz
- Gerovich, Gurovich, Gurevich, Gurvich, Gourevitch, Gurewitsch, Gorovits, Gorovitz
- Orovitz/Orowitz/Orwitz/Orwicz/Urvits/Urvitz/Urwicz/Urwitz
