= Disjunction property of Wallman =

In mathematics, especially in order theory, a partially ordered set with a unique minimal element 0 has the disjunction property of Wallman when for every pair (a, b) of elements of the poset, either b ≤ a or there exists an element c ≤ b such that c ≠ 0 and c has no nontrivial common predecessor with a. That is, in the latter case, the only x with x ≤ a and x ≤ c is x = 0.

A version of this property for lattices was introduced by Henry Wallman, in a paper showing that the homology theory of a topological space could be defined in terms of its distributive lattice of closed sets. He observed that the inclusion order on the closed sets of a T1 space has the disjunction property. The generalization to partial orders was introduced by Wolk.
