= David Silberman Gurovich =

Government official disappeared after a military coup in Chile

David Silberman Gurovich (June 10, 1939 – disappeared October 4, 1974) was a Chilean engineer who served as an official during the presidency of Socialist Salvador Allende. After the military coup that ousted Allende, Gurovich was detained and disappeared. He was Jewish. He was involved in nationalization efforts. His son David Silberman has advocated for documents related to his father's disappearance to be declassified.

Silberman was sentenced by a military tribunal and sentenced to more than a decade in prison. His family was eventually awarded an indemnity. Two men, Manuel Contreras and Marcelo Moren, were sentenced to seven years in prison in a Supreme Court case over his disappearance. His family was awarded an indemnity.

The Museo de la Memoria y los Derechos Humanos has documents related to him.
