= Shmuel Hurwitz =

Israeli agronomist (1901–1999)

- שמואל הורביץ
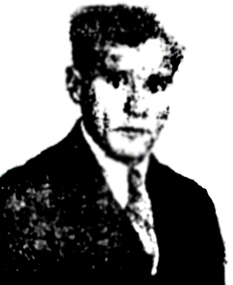
- Born: 12 September 1901; Minsk, Russian Empire
- Died: 1999 (aged 97–98); Israel
- Occupation: Agronomist
- Awards: Israel Prize (1957)

Shmuel Hurwitz (Hebrew: שמואל הורביץ; 12 September 1901 – 1999) was an Israeli agronomist.

== Biography ==
Hurwitz was born in Minsk, then in the Russian Empire (now in Belarus), and studied in Moscow. He was a close friend of the poet Saul Tchernichovsky, with whom he shared accommodation. In 1917, his sister was murdered by an antisemitic gang in Ukraine. In 1924, Hurwitz was arrested for his Zionist activities, and after spending a few months in prison, in 1925 he emigrated to Mandate Palestine (now Israel). He was initially a member of Kibbutz Gesher, until 1926, but subsequent went to Germany to study at the College of Agriculture in Berlin.

From 1933 until 1954, Hurwitz worked at the Agricultural Research Station of the Jewish Agency in Rehovot, and was among its founders. In 1953, he became professor at Hebrew University of Jerusalem, and was appointed Dean of the Faculty of Agriculture in 1964.

== Awards ==
- In 1957, Hurwitz was awarded the Israel Prize, for agriculture.

== See also ==
- List of Israel Prize recipients
- Hurwitz
