= Zvi Harry Hurwitz =

Israeli journalist and diplomat (1924–2008)

- צבי הארי הורביץ
- Born: 29 August 1924; Liepāja, Latvia
- Died: 1 October 2008 (aged 84); Kfar Saba, Israel
- Resting place: Har HaMenuchot Cemetery, Jerusalem, Israel
- Other name: Harry Zvi Hurwitz
- Citizenship: Latvian (at birth), South African (by naturalization), Israeli (under the Law of Return)
- Occupations: Journalist, diplomat, public servant
- Known for: Founder of the Menachem Begin Heritage Center
- Political party: Likud
- Spouse: Freda Hurwitz
- Children: Hillel (son), Shira (daughter, pre-deceased)
- Parent(s): Maishe and Malshen (Kutisker) Hurwitz

Zvi Harry Hurwitz (Hebrew: צבי הארי הורביץ; August 29, 1924 – October 1, 2008), also known as Harry Zvi Hurwitz, was a South African journalist and Jewish community leader who moved to Israel, where he served as an Israeli diplomat and adviser to prime ministers Menachem Begin and Yitzhak Shamir before founding the Menachem Begin Heritage Center.

== Early years ==
Hurwitz was born in 1924 in Liepāja, Latvia to Maishe and Malshen (Kutisker) Hurwitz, who migrated to Johannesburg in what was then the Union of South Africa with their two sons when Harry was ten-years-old. In so doing, the family avoided what would have been almost certain death during the Holocaust, when all but 20 or 30 of the city's 7,000 Jews were murdered by Nazi Germany and Latvian collaborators.

== Zionist activity ==
Latvia was the birthplace of Betar, the Revisionist Zionist youth movement, which the young Hurwitz joined when he heard Ze'ev Jabotinsky, the founder of Revisionist Zionism, speak a year before his family's departure. Hurwitz went on to become a national leader of Betar and Revisionist organizations in South Africa, and later headed the South African Zionist Federation. A professional journalist, he served for 25 years as the editor of The Jewish Herald, a weekly that was the organ of the United Zionist Revisionist Party of Southern Africa, and was a frequent broadcaster, television commentator and public speaker.

In 1964, Hurwitz was one of Jabotinsky's pallbearers when he and his wife were reburied on Mount Herzl in Jerusalem.

A long-time supporter of Menachem Begin, Hurwitz first met the future Prime Minister of Israel in 1946 during a visit to Mandatory Palestine following the 22nd Zionist Congress in Basel, Switzerland, when Begin, as the commander of the Irgun, was still in the underground hiding from British authorities. The two continued to maintain contact after Israel gained independence and throughout Begin's two stints as Leader of the Opposition and his service as Minister without Portfolio in a national unity government.

== Government service ==
Following Begin's 1977 election as Prime Minister, Hurwitz and his wife, Freda, made aliyah, settling in Jerusalem. He subsequently joined the Prime Minister's Office as Adviser for External Information, and served in that capacity until 1980, when he was appointed Minister of Information at the Embassy of Israel in Washington, D.C. He returned to Jerusalem in mid-1983 to become Adviser to the Prime Minister for Diaspora Affairs, first under Begin and then, following Begin's resignation, under Yitzhak Shamir. He held that position until Shamir was replaced as prime minister by Yitzhak Rabin in July 1992.

== Menachem Begin Heritage Center ==
Upon Begin's death in March 1992, Hurwitz proposed the establishment of a living memorial to Israel's sixth prime minister based on the American presidential library concept. It was the first such institution in Israel. To bring that project to fruition he organized the Menachem Begin Heritage Foundation which, under his leadership, raised $20 million to construct the Menachem Begin Heritage Center in Jerusalem, opposite Mount Zion.

In 1998, at Hurwitz's urging, then-Knesset member Reuven Rivlin proposed the Menachem Begin Commemoration Law, which was adopted with support from almost 100 of the Israeli parliament's 120 members. The law established the future Begin Center as the official, state-funded memorial for Prime Minister Menachem Begin. Opened in 2004, the Center provides a framework for students, soldiers, citizens, and tourists to learn about and experience the life of Menachem Begin, identify his place in history and examine his life's work. The Begin Center houses a museum, archives, library, and research center and hosts a variety of programs "to achieve its goal of passing on to future generations Begin's belief in democracy and parliamentarianism, his vision of peace for a secure Israel, social justice, and the return of Jews to Israel."

== Awards ==
Hurwitz was presented with the 2005 Prime Minister's Prize by Israel's Presidents and Prime Ministers Memorial Council in recognition of his role in establishing the Center and, in 2008, a Yakir Zion Award by the South African Zionist Federation in Israel.

== Death ==
Hurwitz served as head of the center until he died on October 1, 2008, at the age of 84 after suffering a massive heart attack at his son's home on Rosh Hashanah, the Jewish new year. He was buried in the section reserved for Irgun veterans at the Har HaMenuchot cemetery in Jerusalem. Eulogies were delivered by Moshe Arens, Benny Begin, Benjamin Netanyahu, Reuven Rivlin, family members, and Begin Center colleagues.

The Center later named its foyer in honor of the Hurwitz family and annually awards the Harry Hurwitz Hasbara in Action Prize.

== Published works ==
Hurwitz was the author of Begin: His Life, Works and Deeds, Gefen Publishing House, 2004, ISBN 978-965229324-4, which was previously issued as Begin: A Portrait by B'nai B'rith Book Service, 1994, ISBN 9780910250276. It was a revised and updated version of Begin: A Portrait, The Jewish Herald (PTY) Ltd., 1977, ISBN 0-620-02933-1, which was the first Begin biography ever written.

He also co-edited (with Yisrael Medad) the posthumously published Peace in the Making: The Menachem Begin-Anwar Sadat Personal Correspondence, Gefen Publishing House, 2011, ISBN 978-965-229-456-2.

== Trivia ==
Due to a case of mistaken identity after a different man with the same name died, The Jerusalem Post published an obituary of Hurwitz on January 15, 2001, entitled "A Noble Spirit," written by Shmuel Katz, who was his predecessor as Begin's Adviser for External Information. "The first thing I did after reading my own obituary was call up my friend Shmuel Katz who wrote it and thank him for all the lovely things he said about me," Hurwitz, who had a sense of humor, told the Post afterwards. "Not everyone has the privilege of reading their own obituary, and it was a lovely one." A few days later, at a special meeting on the subject of South African Jewry held at the Jewish Agency, participants were asked to introduce themselves and state where they resided. When his turn came, Hurwitz announced "Harry Hurwitz from heaven."

Hurwitz later framed a copy of the subsequent Post article in which the newspaper acknowledged the error and hung it on his office wall. (In the end, Hurwitz outlived Katz by almost five months and it was he who attended the other's funeral.)
