= Shelley Hurwitz =

American biostatistician

- Education: Arizona State University; Stanford University; Temple University
- Scientific career
- Fields: Biostatistics
- Workplaces: Harvard Medical School; Brigham and Women's Hospital

Shelley Hurwitz is an American biostatistician. She is the Director of Biostatistics in the Center for Clinical Investigation at Brigham and Women's Hospital, and an associate professor in the Harvard Medical School.

== Ethics ==
As well as biostatistics, Hurwitz maintains an interest in professional ethics for statisticians. She chaired the Committee on Professional Ethics of the American Statistical Association from 2010 to 2012, chaired the Committee on Ethical Practice of Clinical and Translational Biostatistics of the CTSA Consortium from 2012 to 2014, and belongs to the Advisory Board on Ethics of the International Statistical Institute.

== Education and career ==
Hurwitz has two master's degrees: an M.A. in psychology from Arizona State University, earned in 1977, and an M.S. in statistics from Stanford University, earned in 1981. She completed her Ph.D. in psychology in 1992 at Temple University. Her dissertation was Judgments of Correlation: Level of Measurement and Co-occurrence Bias. She worked as a statistician at the University of Pennsylvania from 1981 to 1992, when she moved to the Harvard School of Public Health. In 1997, she moved again, to Brigham and Women's Hospital, and at the same time took a teaching position in the Harvard Medical School. She became a regular-rank faculty member at Harvard in 2005.

== Recognition ==
In 2011, Hurwitz was elected to the International Statistical Institute. In 2014, she became a Fellow of the American Statistical Association.
