= Moshe Meshullam Horowitz Halevy =

Rabbi Moshe Meshullam Halevy Horowitz (1832–1894) was a Galician rabbi.

Born in Cracow, he became the rabbi of Murgeni (Yiddish: מארזען) near Bârlad, now in Romania, and later was a preacher in Lemberg, Cracow, and London.
