= Elazar Hurvitz =

Elazar Hurvitz (born September 23, 1935) is an academic scholar in the field of Talmudic studies.

== Biography ==
He teaches at Yeshiva College and the Bernard Revel Graduate School of Jewish Studies, both schools of Yeshiva University. Hurvitz is Professor of Biblical and Talmudic Literature, and holds the Dr. Samuel Belkin Chair in Judaic Studies. He is also an ordained rabbi. In addition, Prof. Hurvitz is the creator and curator of the Eli Michael Microfilm Center for Genizah Studies on the fourth floor of Yeshiva University's library.

Hurvitz's sub-areas of specialty are: halakhic and midrashic literature, Geonic literature, and Genizah research. He earned a doctorate from Yeshiva University's Bernard Revel Graduate School in 1965. His dissertation was: Nature and sources of Yalkut Talmud Torah by Rabbi Jacob Sikili.

== Publications ==
Hurvitz is the editor of many collections of scholarly articles in the field of Jewish studies. Some of Hurvitz's important publications include:

- An edition of Sefer Ha-Menuḥa, the commentary of Manoaḥ of Narvonne on Maimonides's Mishneh Torah. (Mosad Ha-Rav Kook: Jerusalem. 1970)
- An edition of the commentary of R. Isaac of Saragosa (a student of Nahmanides) on tractates Makkoth and Shevu`oth (and part of Yevamoth) of the Babylonian Talmud. (Mechon Genizat Qahir: Yeshiva University, New York. 1987.)
- The commentary of the "Rid" (Rabbi Isaiah of Trani the Elder) on the Book of Jeremiah. (Yeshiva University: New York. 1986)
- An edition of Geonic Responsa—תשובות הגאונים, Teshuvot Ha-Ge'onim—with rulings from the medieval scholars of Provence. (New York, 1995.)

Hurvitz co-edited, with Jay Braverman, the volume: The Prophet Amos and his times : a selection of sources and studies (Yeshiva College: New York. 1965)

== Grants ==
In 1969–1970, Hurvitz won the National Foundation for Jewish Culture's study grant.
