= Kražiai =

- Town
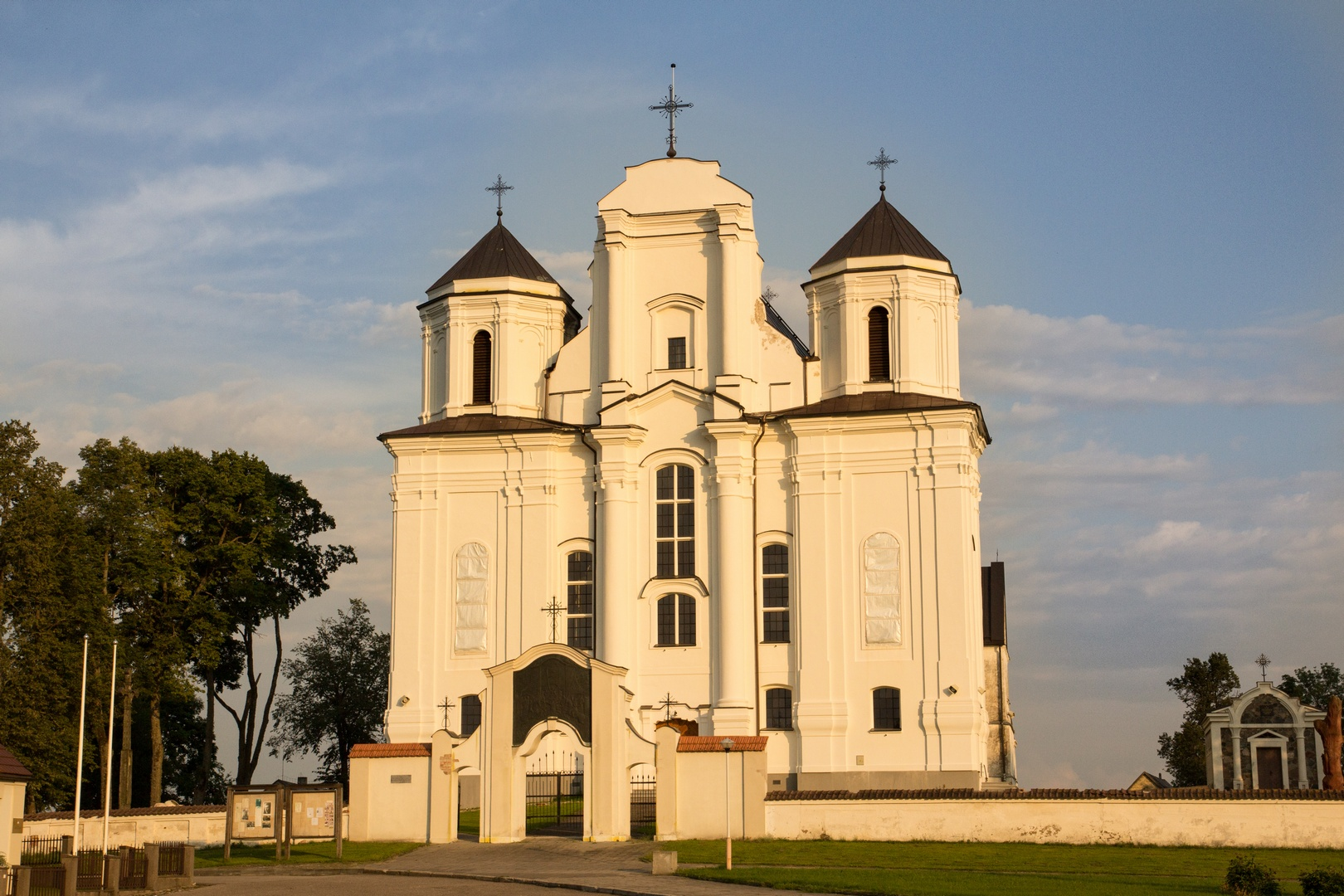

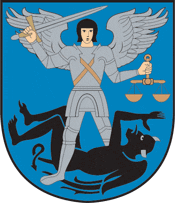
- Coat of arms

- Location of Kražiai
- Coordinates: 55°36′N 22°41′E
- Country: Lithuania
- Ethnographic region: Samogitia
- County: Šiauliai County
- Municipality: Kelmė district municipality
- Eldership: Kražiai eldership
- Capital of: Kražiai eldership
- First mentioned: 1257

Population (2018)
  - Total: 650
- Time zone: UTC+2 (EET)
  - Summer (DST): UTC+3 (EEST)

Kražiai (Yiddish: קראָזש, romanized: Krozh; Samogitian: Kražē; Polish: Kroże) is a historic town in Lithuania, located in the Kelmė district municipality, between Varniai (32 km) and Raseiniai (44 km), on the Kražantė River. The old town of Kražiai is an archeological and urban monument.

== History ==
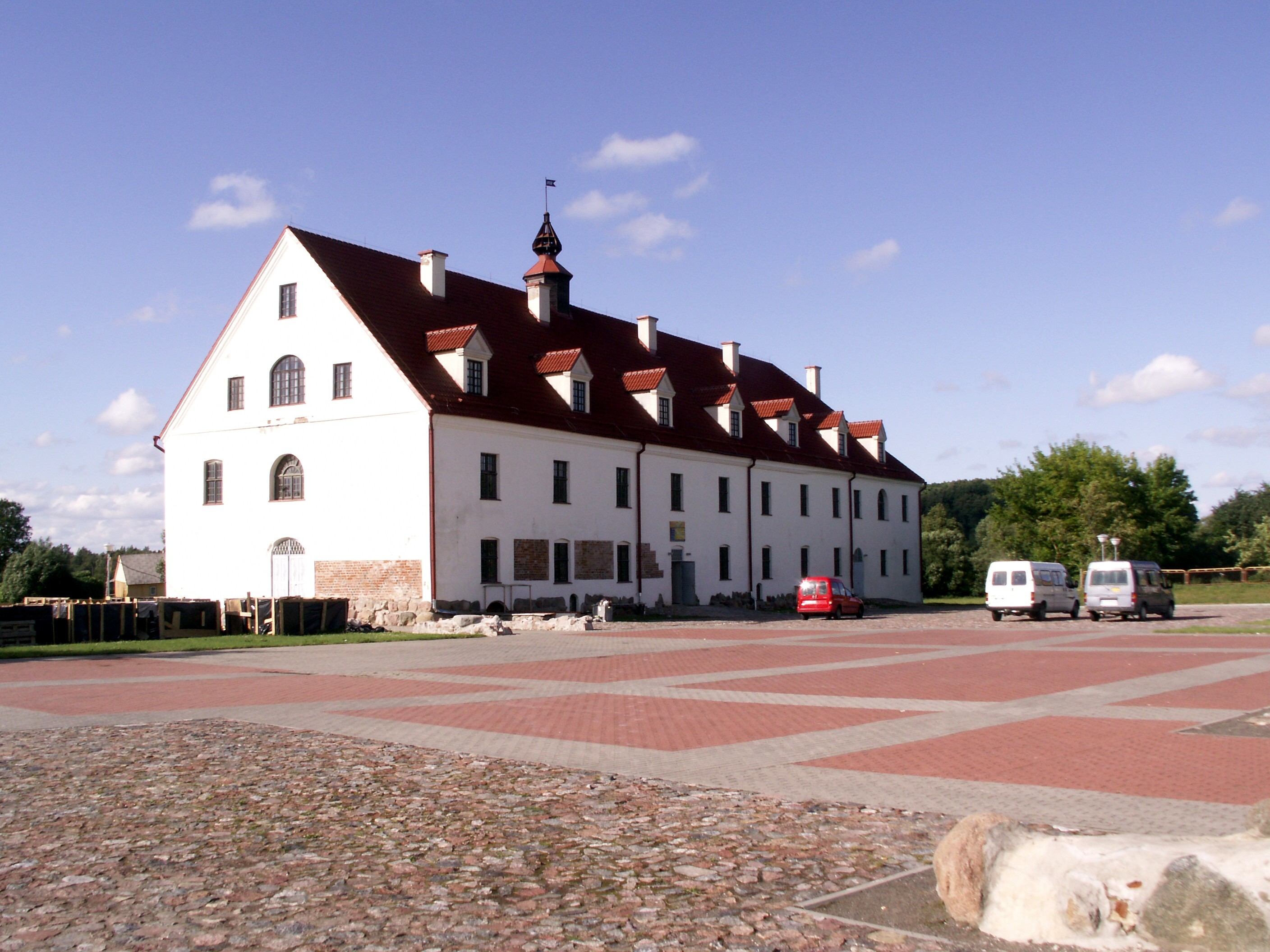
Kražiai College, established in 1616

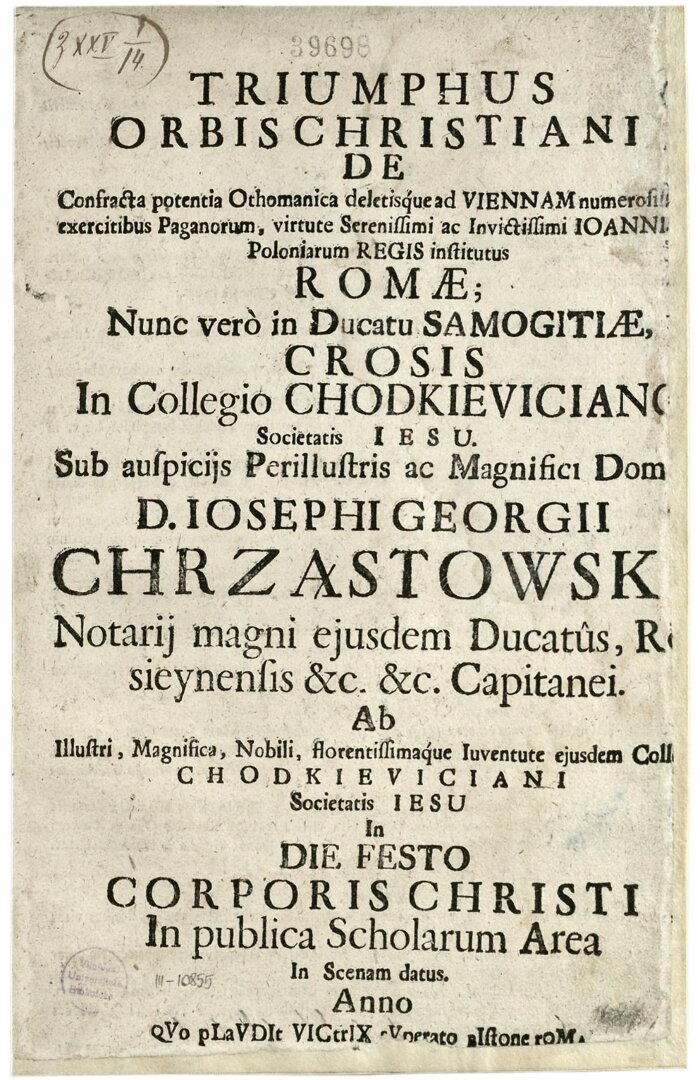
Christian theatre program, performed in 1684 in Kražiai

The population in 1959 was 998; ca. 2,000 in 1939; 1,761 in 1897. The town has a secondary school and is a rural community centre. Under the prewar Republic of Lithuania, Kražiai was the township seat of the county of Raseiniai. After World War II it was assigned to the Soviet administrative district of Kelmė.

Kražiai is one of the older settlements in Samogitia. Many barrow graves and fortress hills are located in its vicinity. The name of the locality is first mentioned (as Crase) in a 1257 document of King Mindaugas, by which a part of Samogitia was assigned to the Teutonic Order. Vytautas the Great during his first years of rule ceded Samogitia to the Order; the regent he appointed lived in Kražiai. After the Battle of Grunwald in 1410, when Samogitia regained its freedom, Kražiai became the district centre. In the 15th century Kražiai was the christening centre of Samogitia.

The English Protestant, Catherine Brandon, Duchess of Suffolk, and her husband Richard Bertie, exiled during the reign of the staunchly Catholic Queen Mary I of England, resided for some years in Kražiai as administrators on behalf of King Sigismund II Augustus.

In the 17th century Kražiai became one of the Catholic centres of the country. There were several monasteries, and the Jesuits established Kražiai College.

With the transfer of the gymnasium to Kovno in 1848, and owing to a devastating fire the following year, the town lost its importance. After the construction of the Libau–Romny Railway in 1880, it became still poorer, and many families emigrated to the United States, Africa, and Australia.

Today, the town is remembered in Lithuania as the site of the Kražiai Massacre of 1893. As part of its Russification campaign, the Russian government decided to tear down the local Catholic monastery church. After petitions to save the church were rejected, people began to gather at the church to prevent the removal of sacred objects. This alarmed Kaunas Governor Nikolai Klingenberg, who led a force of police and Don Cossacks that invaded the church and brutally drove out the people. Afterwards, a number of Catholics were publicly flogged and about 71 were brought to trial. These events were exploited in anti-Russian and anti-Tsarist propaganda that enhanced the development of Lithuanian national consciousness.

=== Jews of Kražiai ===
Known as "Krozh" in Yiddish, the town had a Jewish community dating back to the 15th century. Among the rabbis of Krozh in the 18th and 19th centuries were:

- Rabbi Eliezer (died in Vilna 1769), teacher of Samuel ben Avigdor of Vilna, and known as an eminent Talmudist and philosopher;
- Abraham (died 1804), author of "Ma'alos haTorah", a brother of Elijah of Vilna;
- Uri;
- Mordechai Rabinowitz;
- Yaakov ben Menachem, who occupied the rabbinate for forty years, and died in Jerusalem.

Talmudic scholars and other prominent men of Krozh of the same period were:

- Abba Rosina, also called "Abba Chassid" (died 1792), brother-in-law of Rabbi Leyb of Telšiai; he was a miller by trade, but corresponded with many prominent rabbis on questions of rabbinical law, and Raphael haKohen of Hamburg was his pupil;
- his son Hirsch (died 1810);
- Elijah ben Meïr (Elye Krozher), a wealthy merchant, brother-in-law of the Gaon of Vilna, and lived at Krozh in the first quarter of the nineteenth century (his son Ezekiel was rabbi at Shavli, and his son Jesaiah was dayan at Krozh and rabbi at Salaty);
- Moses Hurwitz (Krozer), dayan in Vilna, where he died in 1821.

Isaac ha-Levi Hurwitz; David, rabbi at Meretz; Zevulun ben Lipman, rabbi at Plungian; and Rabbi Jacob Joseph, who died in New York in 1902, likewise were natives of Krozh.

In 1897 the Jews of Krozh numbered 1,125 out of a total population of about 3,500. About 40% of the former were artisans, a few being farmers and gardeners. Besides the usual charitable institutions, Krozh had two synagogues, two prayer-houses, and about ten different circles for the study of the Bible and the Talmud.

In 1941, the Jews of the town were murdered in mass executions perpetrated by an Einsatzgruppe of Germans and Lithuanian nationalists. Three hundred Jews twelve years of age and older were massacred in a forest near Kuprė and 70 to 80 Jewish children were massacred near Medžiokalnis.
