= Tamara Horowitz =

American philosopher (1950–2000)

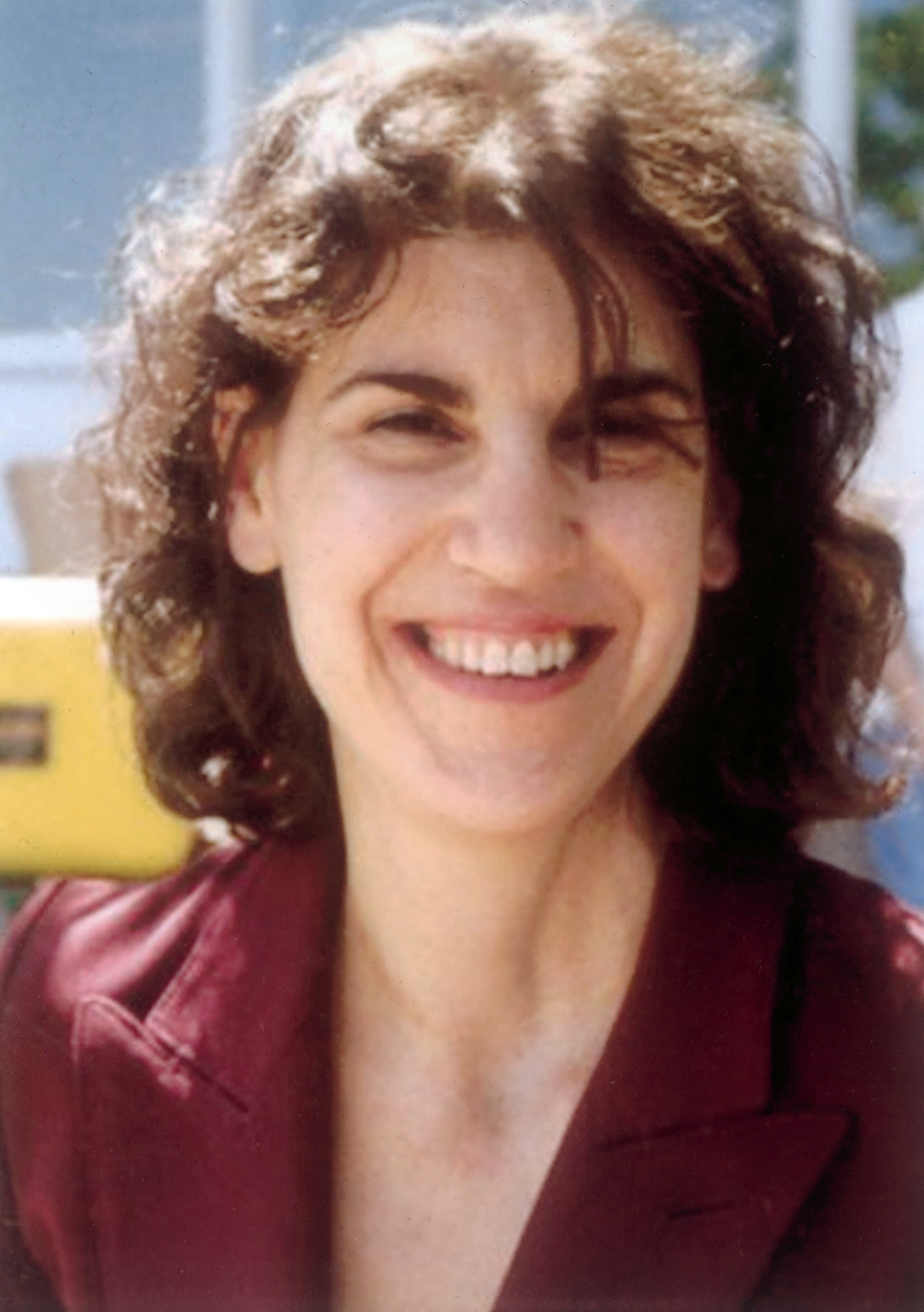
- Horowitz, while at Pitt
- Born: November 7, 1950; Brooklyn, New York
- Died: January 30, 2000 (aged 49); Shadyside, Pittsburgh
- Spouse: Joseph Camp

Education
- Education: Massachusetts Institute of Technology

Philosophical work
- Institutions: University of Pittsburgh
- Main interests: Epistemology, feminist philosophy, philosophy of science

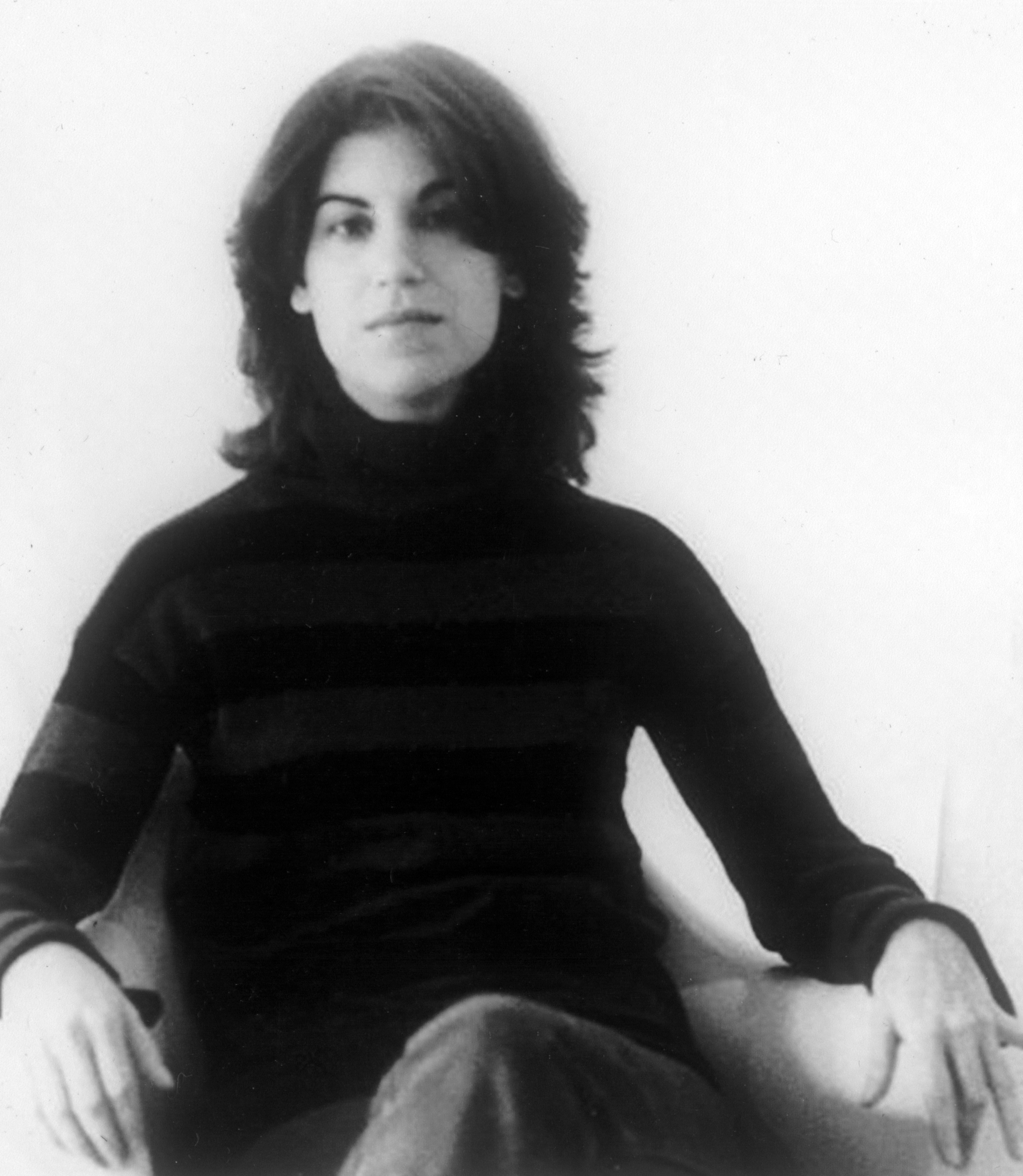
Tamara Horowitz early in her career

Tamara Horowitz (November 7, 1950 – January 30, 2000) was an American philosopher who worked on epistemology, feminist philosophy and the philosophy of science. She spent much of her career at the University of Pittsburgh, and was appointed chair of the philosophy department there in September 1999, but died a few months later.

== Life and career ==
Horowitz was born on November 7, 1950, in Brooklyn, New York, the daughter of a poet/collagist mother and a director/writer father. At age 15, and despite activism against the Vietnam War, she was offered a scholarship to study mathematics at the University of Chicago. She studied for a BA at the institution, where she was taught by Elizabeth Anscombe, graduating in 1971. She went on to study for a doctorate in philosophy at the Massachusetts Institute of Technology (MIT), becoming the first woman to receive a philosophy doctorate from the institution when she graduated in 1976, as well as the first woman to receive a doctorate from MIT's Department of Linguistics and Philosophy. During her mid-twenties, she spent a period of two years not looking in mirrors; though initially this was done as part of a questioning of attachment to appearance, it led her to believe that sense of self can be distorted through a focus on physical appearance.

After her doctorate, Horowitz went to the University of Pittsburgh (Pitt) from 1977–8 as an Andrew Mellon postdoctoral fellow, before teaching variously at Vassar College (instructor/assistant professor of philosophy 1974–78), New York University (assistant professor of philosophy, 1978–83) and Purchase State College, State University of New York (visiting assistant professor of philosophy, 1983-4). She returned to Pittsburgh in 1985 as a visiting assistant professor; that same year, she published "A Priori Truth" in The Journal of Philosophy, an article which was included in volume VIII of the Philosopher's Annual as one of the year's best philosophy papers. She became an assistant professor on the faculty at Pitt the following year. She coedited (with Gerald J. Massey) a collection of 21 papers arising from a conference at Pitt on the philosophy of science; this was published with Rowman & Littlefield as Thought Experiments in Science and Philosophy in 1991. She was promoted to associate professor in philosophy and associate professor in women's studies in 1993, as well as being named the associate director of the university's Center for the Philosophy of Science.

Some years later, Horowitz was appointed chair of the Pitt philosophy department, and took up the role on September 1, 1999. However, she was diagnosed with a brain tumor later that month. She died January 30, 2000, at her home in Shadyside, Pittsburgh. She was married to the philosopher Joseph Camp, and had two stepsons, John and David Camp.

A lecture in memory of Horowitz by Alexander Nehamas—"The place of beauty and the role of value in the world of art"—was published in Critical Quarterly in 2000. Colin MacCabe described Horowitz in an editorial for the issue as someone who

had no time whatsoever for the pompous or the pretentious; her concern was always with argument and debate, with the elaboration of human knowledge. ... [She was] a logician of the first rank who was also committed to a project of social emancipation.

He explained how Horowitz situated her work in the tradition of logical positivism, and intended to return to work on the socialist legacy of the Vienna Circle once her work on belief paradoxes, upon which she had focused later in her life, was complete. A book of Horowitz's work, The Epistemology of A Priori Knowledge, was published in 2006. It was edited by Joseph Camp.

== Selected bibliography ==
Much of Horowitz's work was concerned with either the epistemology of a priori knowledge or with feminist philosophy. Her works include:

- Horowitz, Tamara (1983). "Stipulation and Epistemological Privilege". Philosophical Studies 44 (3): 305–18. doi:10.1007/BF00353538
- Horrowitz, Tamara (1985). "A Priori Truth". The Journal of Philosophy. 82 (5): 225–39. doi:10.2307/2026489. JSTOR 2026489.
- Horowitz, Tamara; Massey, Gerald J. Massey, eds. (1991). Thought Experiments in Science and Philosophy. Lanham, MD: Rowman & Littlefield. ISBN 9780847677061.
- Horowitz, Tamara, and Allen I. Janis, eds. (1993). Scientific Failure. Lanham, MD: Rowman & Littlefield.
- Horowitz, Tamara (1998). "Philosophical Intuitions and Psychological Theory". Ethics. 108 (2): 367–85. doi:10.1086/233809. S2CID 170781977.
- Horowitz, Tamara (2006). The Epistemology of A Priori Knowledge. Oxford: Oxford University Press.
