= Arno David Gurewitsch =

American physician

- Medical career
- Field: Rehabilitation medicine
- Institutions: Columbia-Presbyterian, Mt. Sinai Hospital

Arno David Gurewitsch (1902–1974) was an American medical doctor and medical expert whose career spread across Germany, Israel, and the United States.

== Education ==
He completed his medical degree at the University of Basel and went to work at the Hadassah Hospital in Jerusalem. He moved to the United States on a fellowship. Subsequently, Gurewitsch taught and practiced medicine at Columbia-Presbyterian Medical Center, where he specialized on polio. Later, Gurewitsch became an advisor to the Department of Health, Education, and Welfare and the first medical director at the United Nations.

After the death of Franklin Delano Roosevelt, Gurewitsch became a close friend of Eleanor Roosevelt, serving as the former First Lady's personal doctor. Gurewitsch and Roosevelt traveled together to India, Hong Kong, Thailand, Israel, France, the Soviet Union, and other countries, sometimes photographing her with international leaders. Roosevelt helped to purchase Gurewitsch's townhouse home at East 60th Street on the Upper East Side of Manhattan, where Roosevelt also lived.

Gurewitsch and his family were strongly influenced by Eleanor Roosevelt. Gurewitsch published his recollections of Roosevelt in Eleanor Roosevelt: Her Day, a Personal Album (Quadrangle Press, 1974). His wife, Edna Gurewitsch, also published an account in Kindred Souls: The Devoted Friendship of Eleanor Roosevelt and Dr. David Gurewitsch (St. Martin Press, 2002).

Gurewitsch's widow later described her late husband's relationship with Eleanor Roosevelt:

She could love this man because he could be trusted to keep within the bounds of an idealized love. It was idealistic on both sides, though David's did not include romantic fantasy. (Mrs. Roosevelt inscribed a photograph of herself as a young woman “To David, From a Girl He Never Knew.”) She could express her feelings freely because she knew the setting was safe. She said in a letter that although she never forgot the difference in their ages, she would like David to call her by her first name. He could not, and always spoke and referred to her as “Mrs. Roosevelt.” ... The wedding could not have been easy for her. I believe she thought she would lose him. She needn’t have worried. I loved her, and he respected their confidences. The relationship changed but remained close differently.
