= Abraham Horowitz =

16th-century rabbi

Abraham ben Shabbetai Horowitz (Hebrew: אברהם בן שבתי שעפטיל הלוי הורוויץ) was a 16th-century rabbi and author from Prague.

Horowitz was a student of Moses Isserles and served as a rabbi in several communities.

== Works ==
Horowitz authored: Yesh Noḥalin (Hebrew: יש נוחלין; Amsterdam, 1701),'Emek Beracha (Hebrew: עמק ברכה; Amsterdam, 1729), and Brit Abraham (Hebrew: ברית אברהם; Lemberg, 1875).

His works are frequently cited by his son, Isaiah Horowitz.
