= Shmuel Hurvits =

Russian editor (1862–1943)

- Born: 1862; Minsk, Minsk Governorate, Russian Empire
- Died: March 6, 1943 (aged 80–81); New York City, United States
- Other names: A. Litvin
- Occupations: journalist; editor

Shmuel Hurvits (Yiddish: שמואל הורוויץ; 1862 – March 6, 1943, also spelled Samuel Hurwitz), also known by his pseudonym A. Litvin (א. ליטווין), was a Russian-Jewish journalist, activist, and editor with most of his work in Yiddish.

== Biography ==
Shmuel Hurvits was born to a poor family in 1862 in Minsk, Belarus. He studied at a Jewish primary school until he was twelve, afterwards transferring to a secular school. He trained as a teacher, but abandoned the field soon after graduating, having an ideological appreciation for manual labor. His ideological inclination led him to work as a street paver, followed by a woodcarver, typesetter, bookkeeper, and street peddler over the following decades. He began writing poems and articles in the 1890s; he was initially published in Russian for the St. Petersburg magazine Rodina, but also wrote in Hebrew. He published his first Yiddish work, an article titled "Erets-yisroel un ire heldn" ('The Land of Israel and its Heroes') in the Warsaw-based Zionist periodical Der Yud.

In 1901, Hurvits immigrated to the United States, where he began working at a shoe factory. Alongside this, he distributed newspapers, and wrote for the Forverts and other radical Yiddish papers in New York. He contributed poems and articles, generally on Jewish history. He returned to the Russian Revolution during the 1905 revolution, first moving to Warsaw before settling in Vilna. He founded a Yiddish leftist monthly periodical Leben un Visnshaft ('Life and Science') in Vilna, which ran from March 1909 to the end of 1912. He published pieces from various popular Yiddish authors, translations of foreign works, scientific articles (including works by L. L. Zamenhof) and pieces from younger writers just starting their careers, such as David Einhorn, Shmuel Niger, and Leib Naidus.

Hurvits was one of the founders of the Poale Zion (a Zionist Marxist movement) while in Vilna. Despite his Zionist leanings, he was on friendly terms with the General Jewish Labour Bund and various illegal Bundist groups in Russia. He returned to the United States in 1914, and became the editor of a small publishing house named Kapitlekh Historye ('Chapters of History'). He again wrote for the Forverts, as well as various Yiddish papers including Di Tsayt, Der Yidisher Kempfer, the Morgen Zhurnal, and Di Tsunkunft. He published a six volume anthology of his works entitled Yudishe Neshomes ('Jewish Souls') from 1916 to 1917. He lived in an austere manner, spending much of his time in the United States migrating between various Jewish farming communities. He helped found one named Harmonya in Plainfield, New Jersey. He spent the last years of his life in poverty, living in a room in Coney Island, New York. After his death on March 6, 1943, his corpus of unpublished material was inherited by the YIVO Institute and the Jewish Theological Seminary of America.
