= Hořovice Castle =

Castle in Hořovice, Czech Republic

Coordinates: 49°50′19.36″N 13°54′33.51″E

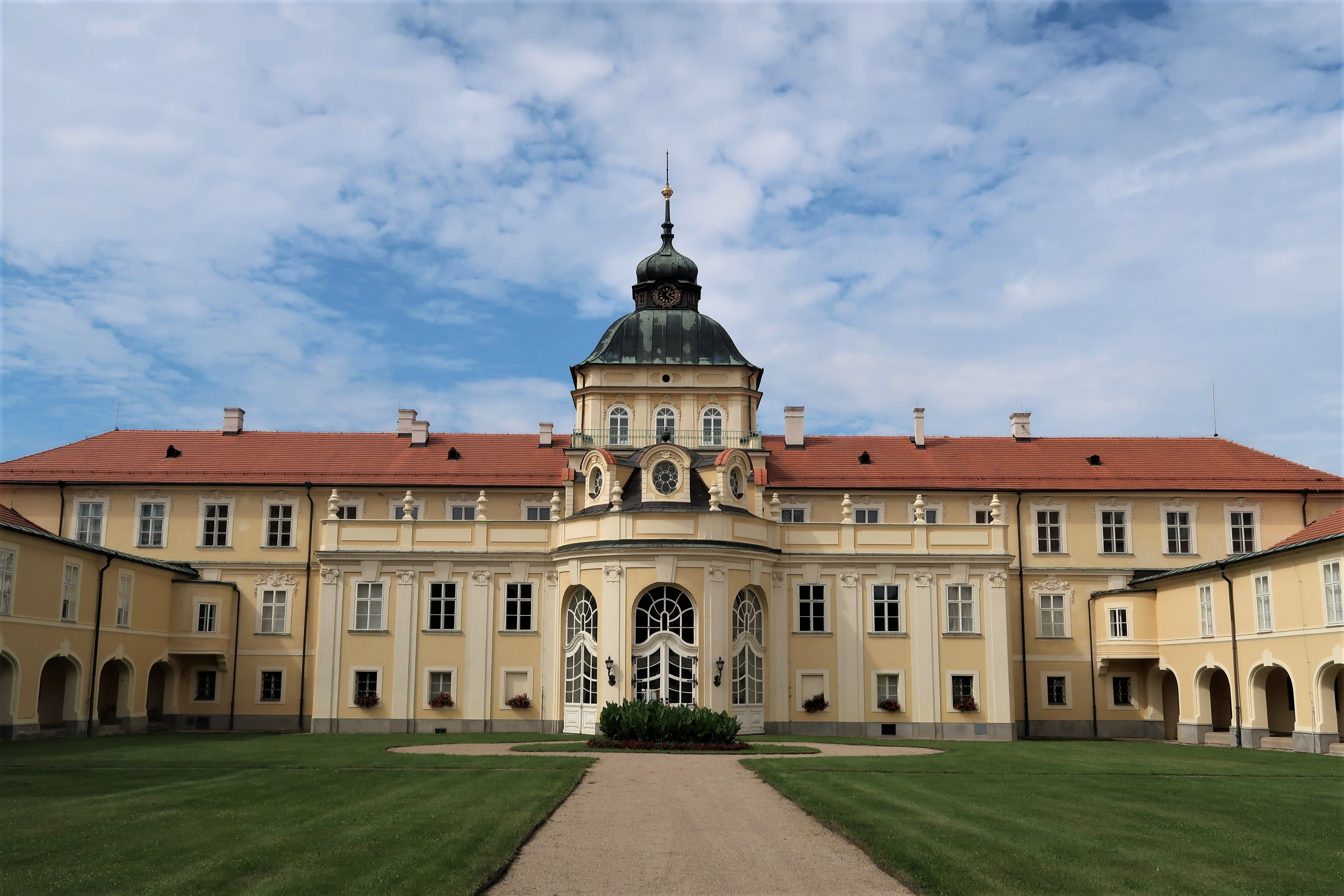
Front view

Hořovice Castle (Czech: zámek Hořovice) is a castle in the town of Hořovice in the Central Bohemian Region of the Czech Republic.

== History ==
It was built in two parts. The so-called "Old Castle" was built in the Gothic style in the 14th century, and the "New Castle" was radically rebuilt and extended in the first half of the 19th century under its owner Frederick William's orders and according to the plans of the Kassel architect Gottlob Engelhardt. The castle only got its final shape after further structural changes due to more refurbishings at the beginning of the 20th century, with furniture of the rooms and the interior being carried out in late Neoclassical style.

The castle served as the primary residence of the Princes of Hanau, since 1867 until the end of the World War II. They were the descendants of Friedrich Wilhelm I of Hesse from his morganatic marriage to Gertrude Lehmann, who was made Princess of Hanau and Horowitz (Hořovice).

== Present ==
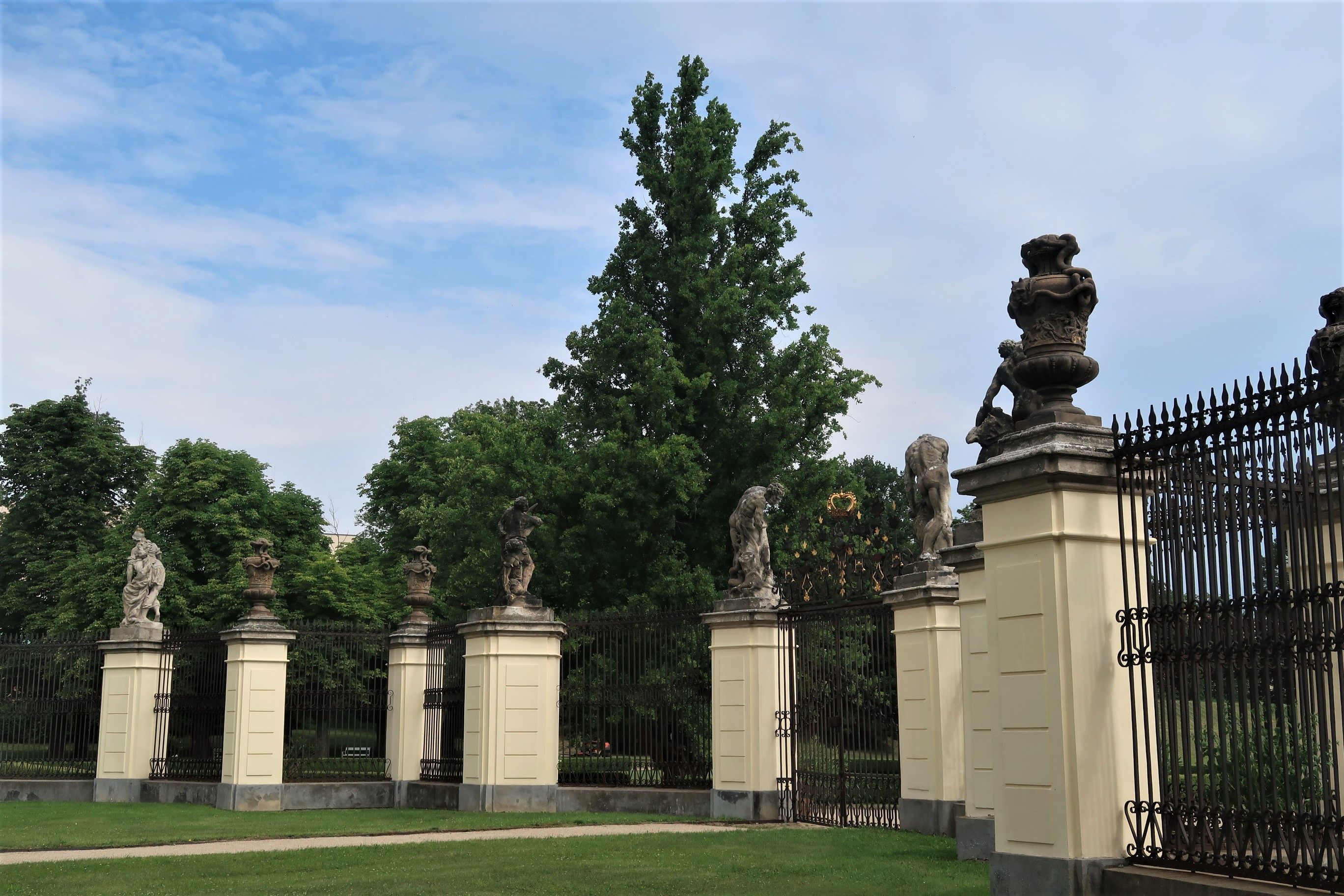
Hercules Gate with sculptures by Matthias Braun

Today, the castle is owned by the state. The New Castle is open to the public and offers sightseeing tours. Since 2001, the castle has been protected as a national cultural monument. The courtyard enclosure is decorated with valuable sculptures by Matthias Braun.

The Old Castle houses the Police of the Czech Republic, the Municipal Library and the Information Centre, and offices of a family centre and of the Museum of the Bohemian Karst. A gallery and exposition of Hořovice Region Museum are also located there.
