= Julia Koricheva =

Russian ecologist in the UK

- Education: Saint Petersburg State University (BSc) University of Turku (PhD)
- Awards: Marsh Ecology Award (2021)
- Scientific career
- Workplaces: University of Turku, University of Zurich, Swedish Agricultural University, Royal Holloway, University of London

Julia Koricheva is an ecologist in the UK. She is professor of ecology at Royal Holloway, University of London and she researches ecosystem services in forests, the interactions between insects and plants and is an expert in meta-analysis.

== Education and career ==
Koricheva is originally from Russia and did a BSc in Zoology and Entomology at Saint Petersburg State University and then a PhD at the University of Turku in Finland, looking at the effects of air pollution on the interactions between birch trees and insect herbivores. She moved to Switzerland to work as a postdoctoral researcher at the University of Zurich before returning to Finland. Koricheva then moved to the Swedish Agricultural University before becoming a lecturer at Royal Holloway, University of London in 2004, where in 2011 she was appointed professor of ecology.

== Research ==
Koricheva has carried out research in forests throughout her career and she established a long term experiment in the Satakunta forest in south west Finland in 1999. The experiment looks at the effects of trees species diversity, tree species composition and intraspecific genetic diversity on ecosystem services. Her work has shown that forests with a high diversity of tree species are able to better provide ecosystem services, such as carbon storage, than forests with few different tree species.

She is an expert in meta-analysis, in 2013 she co-edited the Handbook of meta-analysis in ecology and evolution published by Princeton University Press and she has used meta-analysis techniques to show the harmful effects of neonicotinoid insecticides on bees.

In 2025 Koricheva was elected a Fellow of the British Ecological Society.
