= Shabtai Sheftel Horowitz =

Shabtai Sheftel ben Akiva ha-Levi Horowitz (Hebrew: שבתי שעפטל בן עקיבא הלוי הורוביץ; 1565–1619) was a kabbalistic author, who flourished in Prague in the sixteenth and seventeenth centuries. His father, named Akiba according to Steinschneider and Benjacob, not Jacob, was the son of Abraham Sheftels and the brother of Isaiah Horowitz.

Shabtai Sheftel Horowitz wrote Nishmat Shabbethai ha-Levi, a kabbalistic treatise on the nature of the soul (Prague, 1616), and Shefa Tal (Prague, 1612; Frankfurt, 1719), another kabbalistic compendium, containing also some works of others. The latter has been often reprinted, and is highly recommended by his cousin, Shabbethai the Younger, in his will. According to Seder HaDoroth he wrote a commentary on Moreh Nevuchim but no copies are known.

== See also ==
- Aaron Abraham ben Baruch Simeon ha-Levi
