= David Hurwitz (physician) =

American physician

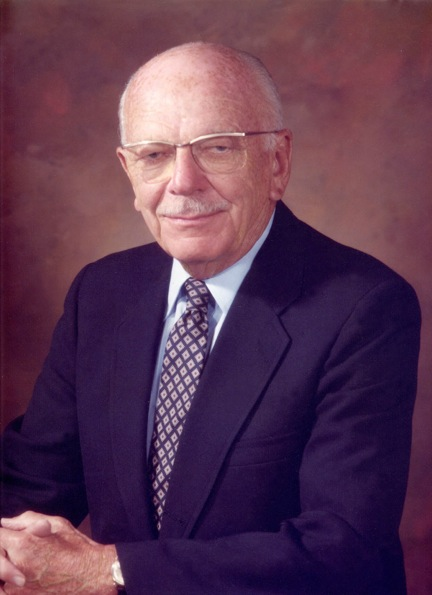
- Born: August 18, 1905; Boston, Massachusetts
- Died: February 22, 1992 (aged 86)
- Known for: Community Hospital Teaching & Diabetes Research

David Hurwitz (18 August 1905 – 22 February 1992) was an American physician, professor of medicine, and researcher in the field of diabetes mellitus, considered "the father of the community hospital teaching concept".

== Medicine: training and early career ==
Born in Boston, Massachusetts in 1905, David Hurwitz was a graduate of Boston English High School and Harvard College and graduated from Harvard Medical School in 1929. He interned at Boston City Hospital under such medical luminaries as George Minot (1934 Nobel laureate), Edwin Locke, Soma Weiss, William Bosworth Castle and Maxwell Finland. Hurwitz joined the teaching staff of Harvard Medical School in 1931 as a research fellow in obstetrics and was appointed clinical professor of medicine in 1967.

== Community Hospital Teaching ==
Hurwitz served as Mount Auburn Hospital's first director of medical education, establishing ties with Harvard Medical School and solidifying Mount Auburn's status as a teaching hospital during his tenure as Chief of Medicine from 1951-1970. In the process, Hurwitz established the institutional prototype of a community teaching hospital. Hurwitz's vision was "to combine the special qualities of the community hospital with the excellence of Harvard Medical School to create the concept of the community/teaching hospital."

As Hurwitz explained in 1963:

However important the specific advances in medical services at the hospital may be, the most important development is the climate for learning which has been engendered among the staff. All of us are perennial students and a good hospital should provide a good environment for this purpose.

Among Hurwitz's innovations was having full-time subspecialists with offices in the hospital, available for emergencies and teaching needs, rather than off-site as was then the practice. Hurwitz was also instrumental in breaking down town/gown barriers in Cambridge, Massachusetts, with a noted ability to work in both the academic and the community/private practice environments. Mount Auburn Hospital's auditorium was named in honor of Hurwitz in 1984 as was an annual lecture series.

== Diabetes Research ==
As a pioneering researcher in the field of diabetes mellitus, Hurwitz improved the management of pregnancy among diabetics, enabling a far higher number of pregnant diabetics to carry their pregnancy to full term. The author of many papers on diabetes, Hurwitz was the recipient of the American Diabetes Association's Pfizer Award for the Outstanding Clinician in Diabetes. Hurwitz was head of the diabetes clinic at Boston City Hospital for 20 years, where he received one of the first National Institute of Health grants for training diabetes fellows, and was President of the New England Diabetes Association in 1965.

== Pearl Birnbaum Hurwitz ==
In 1927, David married Pearl Birnbaum (1907-1993), a Radcliffe graduate who went on to become a major advocate for the rights of mentally disabled people in Massachusetts. "Through her tireless efforts much of the state legislation was passed that recognized the needs and potential of this population." Pearl Birnbaum Hurwitz was the founding President of the Massachusetts Association for Retarded [sic] Children, an advocacy group composed of parents and professionals whose aim was to raise and nurture mentally disabled children in their own homes and communities rather than institutionalizing them, as was the practice of the day. She was appointed by Massachusetts Governor Dever and reappointed by Governor Herter in the 1950s to the legislative commission that revised laws affecting mentally disabled people in the Commonwealth of Massachusetts, resulting in compulsory public education state-wide for this population. Pearl Hurwitz led by example: "In the 1940s, she was among the first to raise a retarded child at home."

In 2014, through a gift from Dr. Ronald Arky, the "Pearl Hurwitz Humanism in Healthcare Award" was established by the Arnold P. Gold Foundation to be presented annually "to a woman who exemplifies humanism and has advanced, through her scholarship, advocacy, leadership or work, the well-being of vulnerable or underserved populations in the health care arena."
