= Moses ha-Levi Hurwitz =

Russian rabbi (??–1820)

Rabbi Moses ha-Levi Hurwitz

Personal life
- Died: 25 October 1820 Vilna, Vilna Governorate, Russian Empire

Religious life
- Religion: Judaism

Jewish leader
- Yahrtzeit: 17 Heshvan 5581
- Residence: Krozh, Kovno Governorate, Russian Empire

Moses ben Isaac ha-Levi Hurwitz (Hebrew: משה בן יצחק הלוי הורוויץ; died 25 October 1820) was a rabbi from Krozh, Kovno Governorate.

He was on intimate terms with the Vilna Gaon, and was the teacher of his sons. He became maggid of Vilna, and occupied that position for many years, until he lost his voice. He was succeeded by Rabbi Ezekiel Feivel of Dretchin (about 1811). His son Ḥayyim was the father of Lazar Lipman Hurwitz. The work entitled Mo'ade ha-shem (Vilna, 1802), on the Jewish calendar, is often credited to Hurwitz.
