= Isaiah Horowitz =

Ashkenazi rabbi & mystic (c.1555–1630)

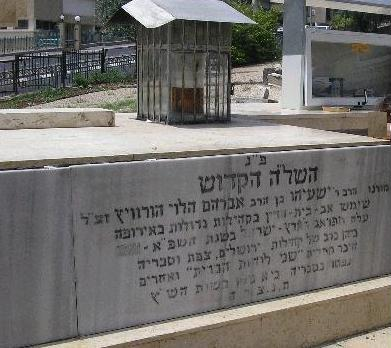
The grave of Isaiah Horowitz in the Tomb of Maimonides compound, Tiberias, Israel

Isaiah Horowitz or Yeshayahu ben Avraham Ha-Levi Horowitz (Hebrew: ישעיה בן אברהם הלוי הורוויץ) (c. 1555 – March 24, 1630), also known as the Shelah HaKaddosh (השל"ה הקדוש 'the holy Shelah') after the title of his best-known work, was a prominent rabbi and mystic.

== Biography ==
Isaiah Horowitz was born in Prague around 1555. His first teacher was his father, Avraham ben Shabtai Sheftel Horowitz, a notable scholar and author, and a disciple of Moses Isserles (Rema). Horowitz studied under Meir Lublin, Joshua Falk and Nasan Nota Shapirah. He married Chaya, daughter of Abraham Moul, of Vienna, and was a wealthy and active philanthropist, supporting Torah study, especially in Jerusalem. In 1590, in Lublin, he participated in a meeting of the Council of Four Lands, and his signature appears on a decree that condemns the purchase of rabbinic positions.

In 1602, Isaiah Horowitz was appointed Av Beit Din in Austria, and in 1606 was appointed Rabbi of Frankfurt. In 1614, after serving as rabbi in prominent cities in Europe, he left following the Fettmilch Uprising and assumed the prestigious position of chief rabbi of Prague.

In 1621, after the death of his wife, he moved to Israel, was appointed rabbi of the Ashkenazi community in Jerusalem, and married Hava, daughter of Eleazer. In 1625, he was kidnapped and imprisoned, together with 15 other Jewish rabbis and scholars, by the Pasha (Ibn Faruh) and held for ransom. After 1626, Horowitz moved to Safed, erstwhile home of Kabbalah, and later died in Tiberias on March 24, 1630 (Nisan 11, 5390 on the Hebrew calendar).

In his many kabbalistic, homiletic and halachic works, he stressed the joy in every action, and how one should convert the evil inclination into good, two concepts that influenced Jewish thought through to the eighteenth-century, and greatly influenced the development of Hasidic Judaism.

Famous descendants of Isaiah Horowitz included Yaakov Yitzchak of Lublin (known as החוזה מלובלין 'The Seer of Lublin'), the prominent Billiczer rabbinical family of Szerencs, Hungary and the Dym family of rabbis and communal leaders in Galicia, Aaron HaLevi ben Moses of Staroselye (a prominent student of Shneur Zalman of Liadi), the Fruchter-Langer families, Rabbi Meir Zelig Mann of Memel, Lithuania (b. 1921, d. 2008), and, on their mother's side, the important Yiddish writers Daniel Charney, Shmuel Charney, and Baruch Vladeck, as well as Elie Wiesel.

== Works ==
His most important work, Shene Luḥot HaBerit (Hebrew: שני לוחות הברית, romanized: Two Tablets of the Covenant, abbreviated Hebrew: של״ה, romanized: Shela), is an encyclopedic compilation of ritual, ethics, and mysticism. It was originally intended as an ethical will – written as a compendium of the Jewish tradition. The title page of the first edition states that the work is "compiled from both Torahs, Written and Oral, handed down from Sinai". The work has had a profound influence on Jewish life - notably, on the early Hasidic movement, including the Baal Shem Tov; Shneur Zalman of Liadi was described as a "Shelah Yid", and Shelah clearly echoes in his work, Tanya. The work was first published in 1648 by his son, Shabbethai Horowitz, and has been often reprinted. An abbreviated form by Yehiel Michel Epstein Ashkenazi appeared in 1683. (See also שני לוחות הברית article in the Hebrew Wikipedia).

Horowitz also wrote the Sha'ar ha-Shamayim siddur (prayer book) which had an influence on the later Ashkenazi nusach.

=== Tefillat HaShelah ===
Rabbi Horowitz wrote that the eve of the first day of the month of Sivan is the most auspicious time to pray for the physical and spiritual welfare of one's children and grandchildren, since Sivan was the month that the Torah was given. He composed a special prayer to be said on this day, known as the Tefillat HaShlah "the Shelah prayer". In modern times, the custom of saying this prayer on the appointed day has become very popular among Orthodox parents.

== Burial place ==
Isaiah Horowitz is buried near the Tomb of Maimonides complex in Tiberias, Israel.

== Literature ==
- "Life and teachings of Isaiah Horowitz", Rabbi Dr. E. Newman, Judaica Press 1972. ISBN 0-9502739-0-2
