= Kurvitz =

Surname

Kurvitz is a surname, from Yiddish Hurwitz. Notable people with the surname include:

- Raoul Kurvitz (born 1961), Estonian artist
- Robert Kurvitz (born 1984), Estonian novelist

== See also ==
- Kurvits
- Kõrvits
