= Jessica Gurevitch =

American ecologist

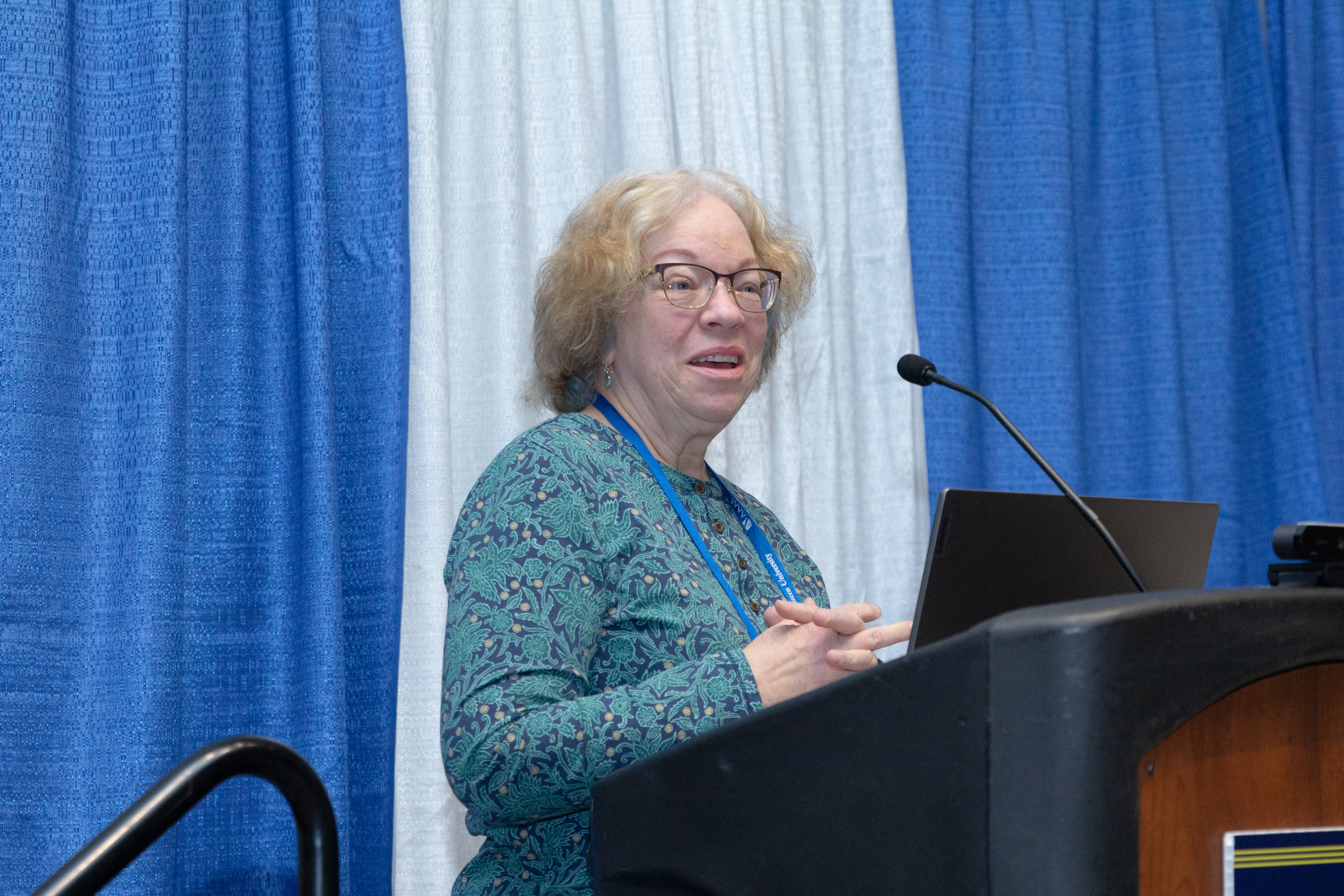
- Gurevitch in 2025
- Education: University of Arizona
- Scientific career
- Workplaces: Stony Brook
- Thesis: C_{3} and C_{4} photosynthesis, competition, and the limits to grass species distributions in an Arizona grassland (1982)

Jessica Gurevitch is a plant ecologist known for meta-analysis in the fields of ecology and evolution.

== Education and career ==
Gurevitch has a B.S. from Cornell University (1973) and earned her Ph.D. in ecology and evolutionary biology from the University of Arizona in 1982. She was a postdoctoral fellow for two years at the University of Chicago before moving to the State University of New York at Stony Brook in 1985. For two years starting in 1992, Guervitch worked at the National Science Foundation before returning to Stony Brook where she was promoted to professor in 2000.

From 2015 to 2016, Gurevitch was president of the Society for Research Synthesis Methodology.

== Research ==
Gurevitch's research interests are centered on biological invasions and meta-analysis in ecology. Her research on grasses perennial plants, and trees relied on a combination of experimental manipulations and observation data. Her interest in biological invasions includes investigations into the invasive flowering plant Centaurea stoebe which is expanding its geographic range in the eastern United States. Gurevitch's research on the recovery of pine barrens after a large 1995 fire in Long Island led to a discussion on the conditions needed to optimize controlled burns to improve the recovery of plants after a fire. In the field of geoengineering, Gurevitch considers the ecological consequences of rapid geoengineering projects as a threat to biodiversity. Gurevitch also considered how habitats in marine and terrestrial biomes could be altered by Stratospheric aerosol injection which was covered by the popular press when the paper was published in 2021.

Gurevitch first became interested in meta-analysis, the combination of data from multiple studies, while reading a 1989 story in the Boston Globe that described a project that gathered multiple studies to reveal that boys and girls were equally good in math. She was the first to apply meta-analysis to ecological data in her 1992 paper that used meta-analysis to study competition in field experiments. Gurevitch has subsequently applied meta-analysis to a range of topics including soil ecosystems and their response to warming, interactions between competition and predation, and biological invasions. In a 2018 paper, she reviewed advances made in the field since it first became relevant to medical and social science research in the 1970s. Beyond conducting meta-analysis projects, Gurevitch develops statistical tools and software needed to conduct meta-analysis projects on ecological data, and co-edited a handbook for ecologists and evolutionary biologists using meta-analysis in their research.

=== Selected publications ===
- Gurevitch, Jessica; Morrow, Laura L.; Wallace, Alison; Walsh, Joseph S. (1992). "A Meta-Analysis of Competition in Field Experiments". The American Naturalist. 140 (4): 539–572. doi:10.1086/285428. ISSN 0003-0147. JSTOR 2462913. S2CID 205982939.
- Gurevitch, Jessica; Hedges, Larry V. (1999). "Statistical Issues in Ecological Meta-Analyses". Ecology. 80 (4): 1142–1149. doi:10.1890/0012-9658(1999)080[1142:SIIEMA]2.0.CO;2.
- Samuel M. Scheiner; Jessica Gurevitch, eds. (2001). Design and Analysis of Ecological Experiments (2nd ed.). Oxford University Press. ISBN 9780198030225.
- Gurevitch, J; Padilla, D (September 2004). "Are invasive species a major cause of extinctions?". Trends in Ecology & Evolution. 19 (9): 470–474. doi:10.1016/j.tree.2004.07.005. PMID 16701309.
- Gurevitch, Jessica; Scheiner, Samuel M.; Fox, Gordon A. (2006). The Ecology of Plants (2nd ed.). Sunderland, Mass.: Sinauer Associates. ISBN 978-0878932948. Gurevitch, Jessica; Scheiner, Samuel M.; Fox, Gordon A. (2002). 1st edition. Oxford University Press, Incorporated. ISBN 0-87893-291-7.
- Julia Koricheva; Jessica Gurevitch; Kerrie Mengersen, eds. (2013). Handbook of meta-analysis in ecology and evolution. Princeton: Princeton University Press. ISBN 9780691137285.

== Awards and honors ==
- Fellow, American Association for the Advancement of Science (2010)
- Fellow, Ecological Society of America (2013)
- Fellow, Stellenbosch Institute for Advanced Studies (2014)
- President, Society for Research Synthesis Methodology (2015–2016)
