= J. C. Hurewitz =

American political scientist (1914-2008)

Jacob Coleman Hurewitz
- Born: November 11, 1914; Hartford, Connecticut, US
- Died: May 16, 2008 (aged 93); New York City, US
- Education: Trinity College, Hartford (BA); Columbia University (MA, PhD)
- Occupation: Middle East scholar
- Employers: U.S. Department of State; United Nations Secretariat; Columbia University
- Notable work: Diplomacy in the Near and Middle East; The Middle East and North Africa in World Politics; The Struggle for Palestine
- Spouse: Miriam Freund (m. 1946–2008)
- Children: 2
- Awards: Ford Foundation overseas travel grant; Guggenheim fellowship; Rockefeller Foundation grant; American Philosophical Society grant; D.Litt., Trinity College, 1962; Center for Advanced Study in the Behavioral Sciences fellowship; Council on Foreign Relations fellowship

Jacob Coleman Hurewitz (November 11, 1914 – May 16, 2008) was an American political scientist.

Hurewitz graduated from Trinity College in Hartford, Connecticut in 1936, then did his graduate work at Columbia, making what was then an unusual decision to concentrate on the Middle East. He worked for the Near East section of the Office of Strategic Services during World War II, then worked successively at the State Department, as a political adviser on Palestine to the President’s cabinet and for the United Nations secretariat. Professor Hurewitz began studying Middle Eastern politics in 1950, before the field had emerged as an academic discipline. From 1970 until 1984, Professor Hurewitz was director of Columbia University's Middle East Institute, after which he retired. In 1972, Hurewitz established the Columbia University Seminar on the Middle East, which he continued to chair until he was nearly 90.

His publications influenced many other historians. For example, Wm. Roger Louis wrote in his book The British Empire in the Middle East, 1945–1951 (Clarendon, 1984) that "my views on Arab nationalism and Zionism, and on the United States and the Middle East, have been influenced by the sensitive and dead-on-the-mark observations of J. C. Hurewitz."

Hurewitz, died on May 16, 2008, of pneumonia, aged 93.

The Hoover Institution Archives hold fourteen boxes of his papers.

== Books ==
- Soviet-American Rivalry In The Middle East, New York Columbia Univ Press (1969), ASIN B0023XB3IA
- The Struggle for Palestine, ACLS Humanities E-Book (2008), ISBN 978-1-59740-465-5
- Soviet-American Rivalry in the Middle East, Praeger for The Academy of Political Science (1972), ASIN B00128M7W8
- Oil, the Arab-Israel Dispute, and the Industrial World, Columbia University, Westview Press, ISBN 0-89158-043-3
- Persian Gulf: After Iran's Revolution, Foreign Policy Assn, ISBN 0-87124-054-8
- Diplomacy in the Near and Middle East, A Documentary Record: Volume 1, 1535 - 1914; Volume 2 1914 - 1956, D. Van Nostrand Company Inc. (1956), ASIN B000TLT4ES
- The Middle East and North Africa in World Politics: A Documentary Record, Second Edition, Revised and Enlarged; Volume 2, British-French Supremacy, 1914–1945, Yale University Press (1979), ISBN 978-0-300-02203-2
- Middle East Politics: The Military Dimension, Frederick A. Praeger (1969); Westview Press (1982), ISBN 978-0-86531-546-4
- Middle East Dilemmas, Harper & Brothers (1953), ISBN 0-8462-1713-9
- Changing Military Perspectives in the Middle East, Rand Corp. (1970), ASIN B0006C9IIC
- The Road to Partition: The Palestine problem, 1936–1948, Norton (1950), ASIN B0006ASFPQ
