= Gurwitch =

Gurwitch is a surname. Notable people with the surname include:

- Annabelle Gurwitch (born 1961), American comedic actress
- Janet Gurwitch (born 1954), founder of Gurwitch Products
