= Alexander Gurwitsch =

Russian and later Soviet biologist and medical scientist

- Born: 26 September 1874; Poltava, Poltava Governorate, Russian Empire
- Died: 27 July 1954 (aged 79); Moscow, Russian SFSR, Soviet Union
- Known for: Morphogenetic Field Theory, Mitogenetic Radiation
- Scientific career
- Fields: Developmental biology

Alexander Gavrilovich Gurwitsch, sometimes Gurvich or Gurvitch (Russian: Александр Гаврилович Гурвич; 1874–1954) was a Russian and later Soviet biologist and medical scientist who originated the morphogenetic field theory and discovered the biophoton.

== Early life ==
Gurwitch was the son of a Jewish provincial lawyer; his family was artistic and intellectual, and he decided to study medicine only after failing to gain a place studying painting. After research in the laboratory of Karl Wilhelm von Kupffer, he began to specialise in embryology, publishing his first paper on the biochemistry of gastrulation in 1895. He graduated from the Ludwig-Maximilians-Universität München in 1897, having studied under A. A. Boehm.

== Morphogenetic field theory ==
After graduation, he worked in the histology laboratories of the universities of Strasbourg and Bern until 1907. At this time, he met his future wife and lifelong collaborator, the Russian-born medical trainee Lydia Felicine. His continuing interest, with the help of his relative Leonid Mandelstam, in the advances in physics at that time aided in the formulation of his morphogenetic field theory, which Gurwitsch himself viewed throughout his life as no more than a suggestive hypothesis.

Serving in 1904 with the Russian army in the field, he had much time to think, and he reasoned with himself that even a full understanding of every developmental process might not provide, or even necessarily lead to, a sense of understanding of ontogeny as a whole; a holistic, "top-down" model was needed to explain the ordered sequence of such individual processes. This conviction led him to adopt field theory as an embryological paradigm. His ideas had much in common with his contemporary Hans Driesch, and the two developed a mutual professional admiration.

During the next decade, Gurwitsch contributed a series of landmark papers arguing that the orientation and division of cells was random at local level but was rendered coherent by an overall field which obeyed the regular inverse square law – an enterprise that required extensive statistical analysis. In 1907, he published his general treatise Atlas and Outline of Embryology of Vertebrates and of Man.

== The biophoton ==
After the 1917 revolution, Gurwitsch fell upon hard times and accepted the chair of Histology at Taurida University, the chief seat of learning of the Crimean Peninsula, where he spent seven happy years. Here in 1923, he first observed biophotons or ultra-weak biological photon emissions – weak electromagnetic waves which were detected in the ultra-violet range of the spectrum.

Gurwitsch named the phenomenon mitogenetic radiation, since he believed that this light radiation allowed the morphogenetic field to control embryonic development. His published observations, which related that cell proliferation of an onion was accelerated by directing these rays down a tube, brought him great attention. Some 500 attempts at replication, however, produced overwhelmingly negative results, so that the idea was neglected for decades until it commanded some renewed interest in the later 20th century. However the furore, which may have sparked Wilhelm Reich's similar Orgone experiments, brought Gurwitsch an international reputation that led to several European lecture tours. His work influenced that of Paul Alfred Weiss in particular. William Seifriz regarded the existence of Gurwitsch rays as experimentally proven.

== Later life ==
Lydia and Anna Gurwitsch

Gurwitsch was Professor of Histology and Embryology at Moscow University from 1924 to 1929 but fell afoul of the Communist Party and was forced to relinquish the chair. He then directed a laboratory at the Institute of Experimental Medicine in Leningrad from 1930 until 1945, though he was forced to evacuate during World War 2. In 1941, he was awarded a Stalin Prize for his mitogenetic radiation work, since it had apparently led to a cheap and simple way of diagnosing cancer. He was director of the Institute of Experimental Biology in Leningrad from 1945 to 1948. He sought to redefine his "heretical" concept of the morphogenetic field in general essays, pointing to molecular interactions unexplained by chemistry.

Gurwitsch retired in 1948 after Trofim Lysenko came to power but continued working at home. His wife Lydia died in 1951. However, his daughter, Anna, continued his work and, shortly after his death, contributed papers that supported some aspects of her father's work on "mitogenetic" rays.

== Legacy ==
Field theories of morphogenesis had their heyday in the 1920s, but the increasing success of genetics confined such ideas to the backwaters of biology. Gurwitsch had been ahead of his time in his interest in the emergent properties of the embryo, but more modern self-organization theories (such as that of Ilya Prigogine) and treatments of non-equilibrium thermodynamics in living systems would show the extent to which the vectors he described can be generated without the assumption of an overarching field, so the search for a physical field was abandoned in favour of more neutral concepts like the paradigm of Systems Biology. The early interest in physics which inspired Gurwitsch in the end tended to render his ideas untenable. The "mitogenetic ray" was one of the scientific topics characterized by Irving Langmuir as "pathological science."

However, the tenacity of Anna Gurwitsch, together with the development of the photon counter multiplier, resulted in the confirmation of the phenomenon of biophotons in 1962. The observation was duplicated in a Western laboratory by Quickenden and Que Hee in 1974. In the same year, Dr. V. P. Kaznacheyev announced that his research team in Novosibirsk had detected intercellular communication by means of these rays. Fritz-Albert Popp claims they exhibit coherent patterns. These studies have drawn only fringe interest.

There has been a recent revival in field theories of life, albeit again at the fringes of science, particularly among those who seek to include an account of developmental psychobiology. The influence of Gurwitsch's theory is particularly evident in the work of the British plant physiologist, Rupert Sheldrake, and his concept of "morphic resonance."

== See also ==
- Regional specification
- Hans Spemann
- Walter John Kilner

== Bibliography ==
- A. G. Gurvich. The Theory of Biological Field. - Moscow: Soviet Science, 1944.
- A. G. Gurvich. Mitogenetic radiation [3rd ed.] - Moscow, 1945.

== Sources ==
- L. Blyakher, S. Zalkind. Alexander Gavrilovich Gurvich. Bulletin of Moscow Society of Naturalists. Department of Biology, 1955, Vol 60, Part 4: Alexander Gavrilovich Gurvich, Moscow, 1970 (a bibliography).
- Biophotonics (L.V.Beloussov and F.-A. Popp eds) BioInform Services, Moscow, 1995.
- Biophotonics and Coherent Systems (L. V. Beloussov, F.-A. Popp, V.L. Voeikov and R. van Wijk eds) Moscow University Press, Moscow 2000.
- Biophotonics and Coherent Systems in Biology by L. V. Beloussov (editor), V. L. Voeikov (editor), V. S. Martynyuk (editor), Springer Science+Business Media, LLC., 2007, New York.
