= Witold Hurewicz =

Polish mathematician (1904–1956)

- Born: June 29, 1904; Łódź, Poland
- Died: July 6, 1956 (aged 52); Uxmal, Mexico
- Education: University of Vienna (PhD)
- Known for: Hurewicz theorem; Hurewicz space; Hurewicz fibration; Higher homotopy groups; Function arrow notation
- Scientific career
- Fields: Mathematics
- Workplaces: Princeton University; Radcliffe College; Massachusetts Institute of Technology
- Thesis: Über eine Verallgemeinerung des Borelschen Theorems (1926)
- Doctoral advisor: Hans Hahn; Karl Menger
- Doctoral students: Felix Browder; Allen Shields; Yael Dowker; James Dugundji; Barrett O'Neill; Miriam Yevick

Witold Hurewicz (Polish: [ˈvitɔld ˈxurvit͡ʂ]; June 29, 1904 – September 6, 1956) was a Polish mathematician who worked in general topology, algebraic topology and dimension theory. A graduate of the University of Vienna, Hurewicz moved to the United States where he held positions at various American institutions of higher learning including the Institute for Advanced Study and the Massachusetts Institute of Technology. He is best known for introducing higher homotopy groups, proving the Hurewicz theorem.

== Early life and education ==
Witold Hurewicz was born on 29 June 1904 in Łódź, at the time one of the main Polish industrial hubs with economy focused on the textile industry. His father Mieczysław Hurewicz was an industrialist born in Wilno, which until 1939 was mainly populated by Poles and Jews. His mother Katarzyna Finkelsztain hailed from Biała Cerkiew, a town that belonged to the Kingdom of Poland until the Second Partition of Poland (1793) when it was taken by Russia.

Hurewicz attended school in a German-controlled Poland but with World War I beginning before he had begun secondary school, major changes occurred in Poland. In August 1915 the Russian forces that had held Poland for many years withdrew. Germany and Austria-Hungary took control of most of the country and the University of Warsaw was refounded and it began operating as a Polish university. Rapidly, a strong school of mathematics grew up in the University of Warsaw, with topology one of the main topics. Although Hurewicz knew intimately the topology that was being studied in Poland, in 1921, he chose to go to Vienna to continue his studies.

He studied under Hans Hahn and Karl Menger in Vienna, receiving a PhD in 1926 on the basis of his thesis Über eine Verallgemeinerung des Borelschen Theorems (On a Generalization of Borel's Theorem). Hurewicz was awarded a Rockefeller scholarship, which allowed him to spend the year 1927–28 in Amsterdam. He was assistant to L. E. J. Brouwer in Amsterdam from 1928 to 1936. He was given study leave for a year, which he decided to spend in the United States. He visited the Institute for Advanced Study in Princeton, New Jersey and then decided to remain in the United States and not return to his position in Amsterdam. Hurewicz collaborated with the Warsaw School of Mathematics maintaining close contacts with Karol Borsuk, Samuel Eilenberg and Bronisław Knaster, co-authoring with Knaster Ein Einbettungessatz über henkelfreie Kontinua in 1933.

== Career ==
Hurewicz worked first at the University of North Carolina at Chapel Hill but during World War II he contributed to the war effort with research on applied mathematics. In particular, the work he did on servomechanisms at that time was classified because of its military importance. From 1945 until his death he worked at the Massachusetts Institute of Technology.

Hurewicz's early work was on set theory and topology. The Dictionary of Scientific Biography states: "...a remarkable result of this first period [1930] is his topological embedding of separable metric spaces into compact spaces of the same (finite) dimension.*"

In the field of general topology his contributions are centred on dimension theory. He wrote an important text with Henry Wallman, Dimension Theory, published in 1941. A reviewer writes that the book "...is truly a classic. It presents the theory of dimension for separable metric spaces with what seems to be an impossible mixture of depth, clarity, precision, succinctness, and comprehensiveness."

Hurewicz is best remembered for three remarkable contributions to mathematics: his discovery of the higher homotopy groups in 1935–36, his discovery of the long exact homotopy sequence for fibrations in 1941, and the Hurewicz theorem connecting homotopy and homology groups. His work led to homological algebra. It was during Hurewicz's time as Brouwer's assistant in Amsterdam that he did the work on the higher homotopy groups; "...the idea was not new, but until Hurewicz nobody had pursued it as it should have been. Investigators did not expect much new information from groups, which were obviously commutative..."

Hurewicz was also first to represent a function by an arrow, in about 1940. This rapidly displaced the old notation. It was proven fundamental for the development of category theory.

In the late 1940s, he was the doctoral advisor of Yael Dowker.

Hurewicz had a second textbook published, but this was not until 1958 after his death. Lectures on ordinary differential equations is an introduction to ordinary differential equations that again reflects the clarity of his thinking and the quality of his writing. He also published a number of papers in Polish scientific journals including 11 works in Fundamenta Mathematicae.

He died after participating in the International Symposium on Algebraic Topology at the National Autonomous University of Mexico in Mexico City. He tripped and fell off the top of a Mayan step pyramid during an outing in Uxmal, Mexico. In the Dictionary of Scientific Biography it is suggested that he was "...a paragon of absentmindedness, a failing that probably led to his death."

== See also ==
- List of Polish mathematicians
- Hurewicz homomorphism
- Zygmunt Janiszewski
