= Daniel Harrwitz =

German chess player (1821–1884)

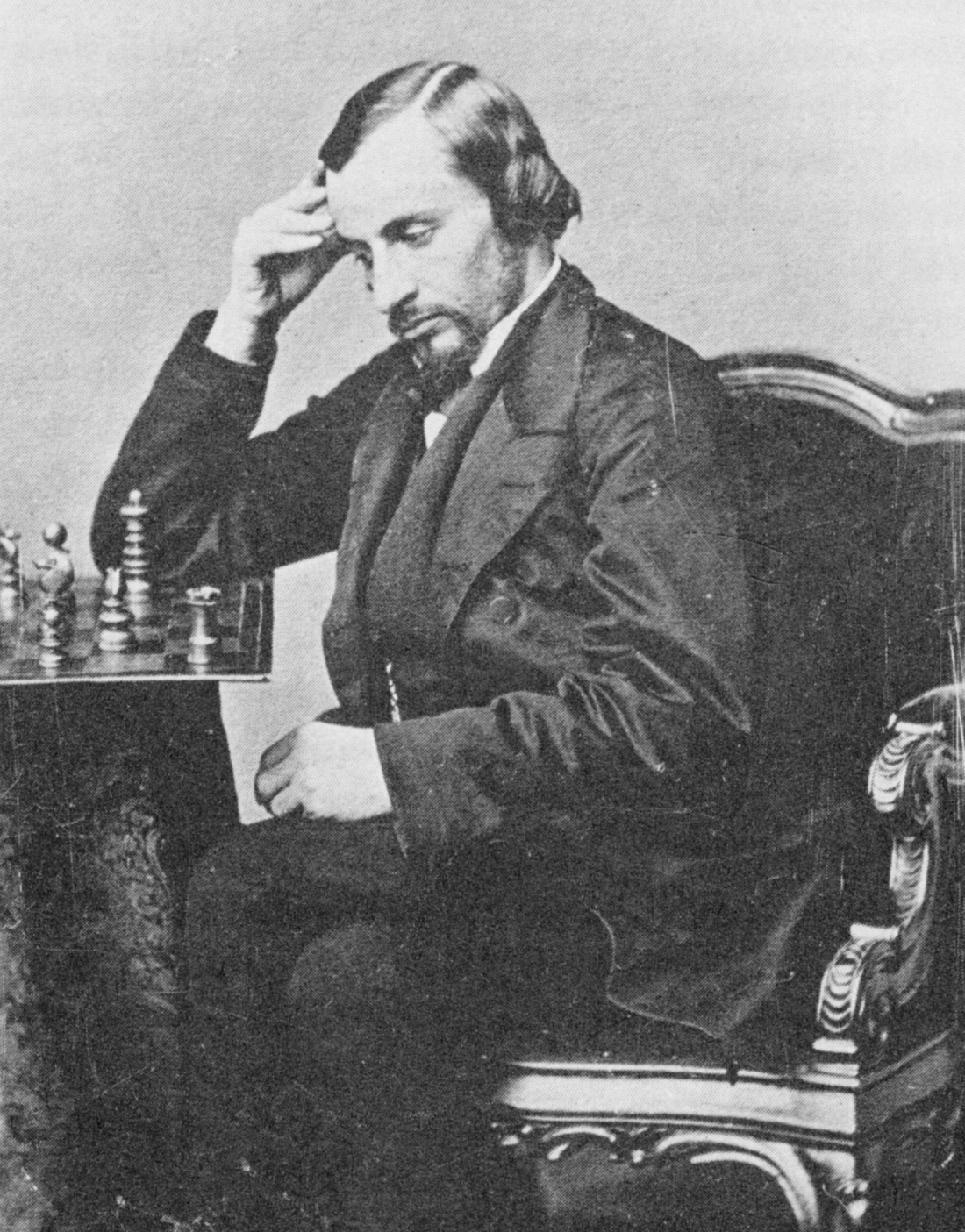
- Daniel Harrwitz

Personal information
- Born: Daniel Harrwitz; 22 February 1821 Breslau, Province of Silesia, Kingdom of Prussia
- Died: 2 January 1884 (aged 62) Bozen, County of Tyrol, Austria-Hungary

Chess career
- Country: Germany

Daniel Harrwitz (22 February 1821 – 2 January 1884) was a German chess master.

Harrwitz was born in Breslau (Wrocław) in the Prussian Province of Silesia. Harrwitz's correct birth and death dates (22 February 1821 and 2 January 1884 respectively) were established by Luca D'Ambrosio in Chess Notes item 6286. He established his reputation in Paris, particularly as a player of blindfold games. He lost a match in England to Howard Staunton in 1846 at odds of a pawn and two moves, and drew a match with Adolf Anderssen in Germany in 1848.

Harrwitz lived in England from 1849, and founded the British Chess Review. In 1856, he moved to Paris, where he won a match against Jules Arnous de Rivière. In 1858, he played a match against Paul Morphy in Paris. Harrwitz won the first two games, but lost the match 5½-2½. Harrwitz withdrew from the match, allegedly on grounds of ill health. He subsequently retired to the Austro-Hungarian county of Tyrol, dying in Bolzano in 1884.

== Game against Morphy ==
Although he had a negative record against Morphy, he was one of a few masters who beat Morphy with the black pieces. Here is one of his wins in Paris in 1858:

1.e4 e5 2.Nf3 d6 3.d4 exd4 4.Qxd4 Nc6 5.Bb5 Bd7 6.Bxc6 Bxc6 7.Bg5 Nf6 8.Nc3 Be7 9.0-0-0 0-0 10.Rhe1 h6 11.Bh4 Ne8 12.Bxe7 Qxe7 13.e5 Bxf3 14.gxf3 Qg5+ 15.Kb1 dxe5 16.Rxe5 Qg2 17.Nd5 Qxh2 18.R5e1 Qd6 19.Rg1 Kh7 20.Qe3 f5 21.Nf4 Qb6 22.Qe2 Rf7 23.Qc4 Qf6 24.Nh5 Qe7 25.Rde1 Qd7 26.a3 Nd6 27.Qd4 Rg8 28.Rg2 28. Rg2 and Black eventually won.

The game continued with 28...Ne8 29.Qc3 f4 30.Rh1 g6 31.Rhg1 Qd5 32.Qe1 Qxh5 33.Rg5 Qxf5 34.Qxe6 Rf6 35.Qe7+ Rg7 36.Qxe8 hxg5 37.Qe1 Qc6 and Black wins. (Quelle: Maroczy, "Morphy")

== See also ==
- List of Jewish chess players
