= Zalkind Hourwitz =

Polish Jewish essayist

Zalkind Hourwitz (1751–1812) was a Polish Jew who moved from Lublin to Metz and later Paris, where he became a prominent voice in French Revolutionary politics. His essay, Vindication of the Jews, was one of three winners in a contest held by the Royal Society of Arts and Sciences in Metz, which famously asked: "Are there means for making the Jews happier and more useful in France?"

== Early life ==
In his youth, Zalkind Hourwitz journeyed from his home near Lublin to Berlin, where he earned a living as a tutor for affluent families. During this time, he may have encountered the renowned philosopher Moses Mendelssohn. Following this period, he traveled through Metz before finally settling in Paris in 1774. After moving to Paris, his interest in revolutionary politics blossomed. Though socially marginalized, he was intellectually ambitious and politically aware. Through peddling on the streets of Paris and selling used clothing, Hourwitz was able to pursue education with determination. While pursuing his education, Hourwitz immersed himself in the city's intellectual life, seeking out community in public gardens and cafes. He remained politically informed by studying the pamphlets and posters plastered across street corners and shopfronts, a habit that gradually wove him into the fabric of local activism.

As the Revolution progressed, Hourwitz moved from intellectual observer to active participant in debates over equality, civil rights, and Jewish inclusion. Through pamphlets and petitions, he articulated a vision of citizenship that challenged the religious boundaries long used to exclude Jews from the political nation. His engagement was not abstract but directly confronted accusations that Jews had remained silent in the face of centuries of persecution. Rejecting this charge, Hourwitz argued that “Our silence… should be seen not as a confession of our guilt but, rather, the result of timidity and the realization that justifications would only further irritate our tyrants” By redefining silence as a strategy of survival rather than evidence of wrongdoing, he dismantled a common justification for exclusion and asserted a new, more confident Jewish presence in revolutionary political discourse.

== Vindication of the Jews: ==
Excerpt from Vindication of the Jews:

"The means of making the Jews happy and useful? This is it: stop making them unhappy and useless. Give them, or rather return to them the right of citizens, which you've denied them against all divine and human laws and against your own interests, like a man who thoughtlessly cripples himself."

In Vindication of the Jews, Hourwitz demands the full privileges of citizenship, including land ownership, occupational freedom and education. However, as a follower of the Enlightenment ideals, he also criticizes the power which Jewish leaders have in the community and demands "rabbis and leaders must be severely forbidden from claiming the least authority over their co-religionists outside the synagogue."

Although the 1791 decree formally granted Jews citizenship, social acceptance did not follow automatically. Many non-Jews remained hesitant to allow a community long-stigmatized as "usurious" to control property or enter social circles previously closed to them. These reactions demonstrate that legal equality alone could not instantly dismantle deep-seated prejudice. For Hourwitz, citizenship was not a final status secured by law, but an ongoing negotiation between revolutionary ideals and persistent social suspicion.

== Timeline of Hourwitz in the Revolution ==
- August 1788—Hourwitz, along with Claude Antoine Thiery and Abbe Gregoire, wins the Metz Royal Society contest
- March 1789—Publication of Vindication of the Jews
- May 1789—Hourwitz appointed Secretaire-interprete of the Bibliothèque du Roi
- September 1789--Journal de Paris includes a long review of Vindication of the Jews
- October 1789—Hourwitz donates a quarter of his net salary to the Revolution
- February 1790—Commune of Paris unanimously adopts resolution demanding the National Assembly acknowledge Jews as citizens
- June 1790—Hourwitz appears before the National Assembly as part of "a delegation of foreigners"
- October 1792—Hourwitz is dismissed from his position at Bibliothèque Nationale along with 11 others
- January 1793—Hourwitz publicly states that he is against the execution of the king
- December 1793- January 1794—Hourwitz appears before the revolutionary committee of the Reunion section
- April 1794—Hourwitz demands from Saint-Just an "explanation" for the decree forbidding foreigners from residing in Paris or in ports.
