= Givat Shaul =

Neighborhood of West Jerusalem

Coordinates: 31°47′21.57″N 35°11′30.73″E

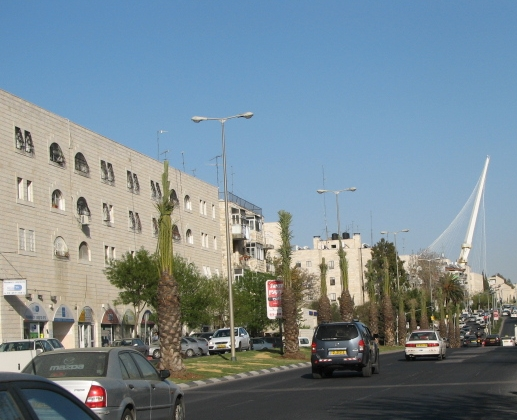
Kanfei Nesharim Street

Givat Shaul (Hebrew: גבעת שאול, lit. (Saul's Hill); Arabic: چڤعات شاؤول) is a neighborhood in West Jerusalem. The neighborhood is located at the western entrance to the city, east of the neighborhood of Har Nof and north of Kiryat Moshe. Givat Shaul stands 820 meters above sea level.

== Name ==
Givat Shaul is named after the Rishon Lezion, Rabbi Yaakov Shaul Elyashar, the Sephardi Chief Rabbi of Israel, and not, as commonly believed, for the biblical King Saul, whose capital was probably located on the hill Gibeah of Saul near Pisgat Ze'ev, on the way to Ramallah.

== History ==
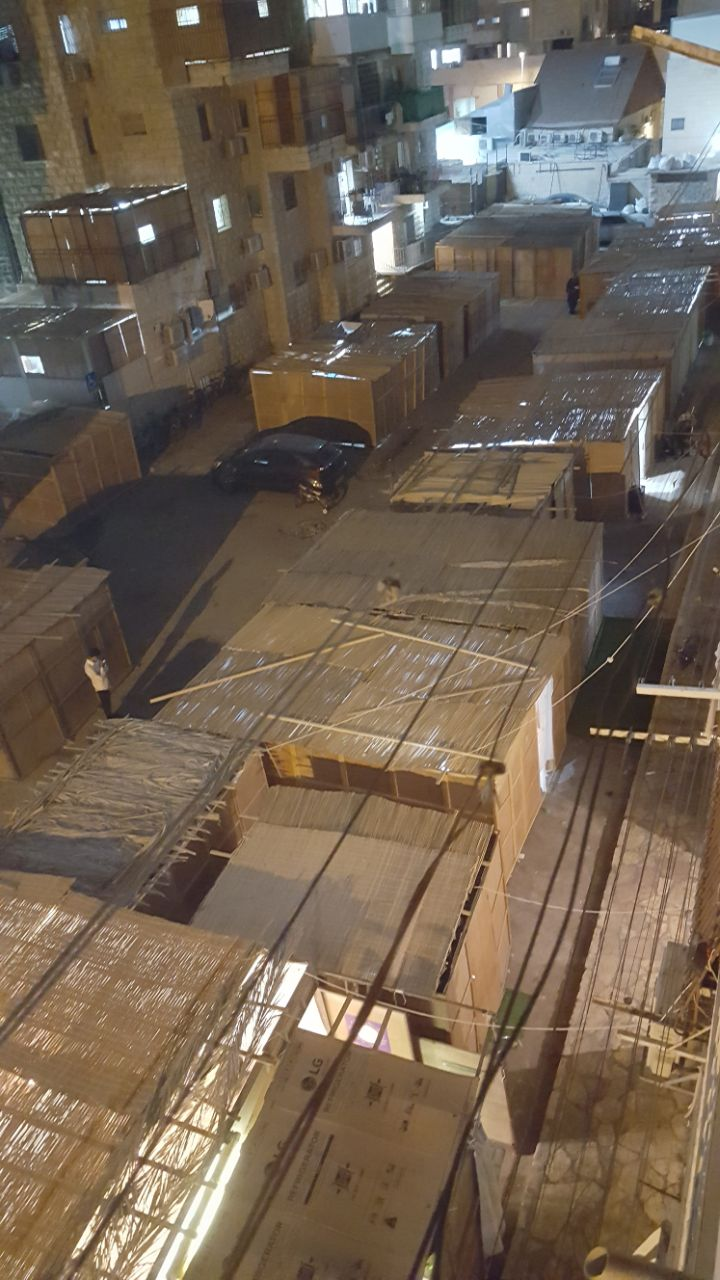
A courtyard in Givat Shaul on Sukkot

Givat Shaul was established in 1906 on land purchased from the Arab villages of Deir Yassin and Lifta by a society headed by Rabbi Nissim Elyashar, Arieh Leib and Moshe Kopel Kantrovitz. Difficulties in registering the land delayed construction until 1919. The first residents were needy families who were given small plots to grow fresh produce that was marketed in Jerusalem. These families, mainly Yemenite Jews, were joined by others from Meah Shearim and the Old City. The Ashkenazim built the first public building, Beit Knesset HaPerushim. In 1912, an embroidery and sewing workshop was opened with the help of a Jewish philanthropist, Rabbi Slutzkin. Other industries established in Givat Shaul were the Froumine biscuit factory, a factory for kerosene heaters that manufactured arms for the British army during the British Mandate of Palestine, and a matza factory. In 1927, the Diskin Orphanage moved to Givat Shaul from the Old City. This building, designed by a local architect named Tabachnik, was home to 500 orphan boys.

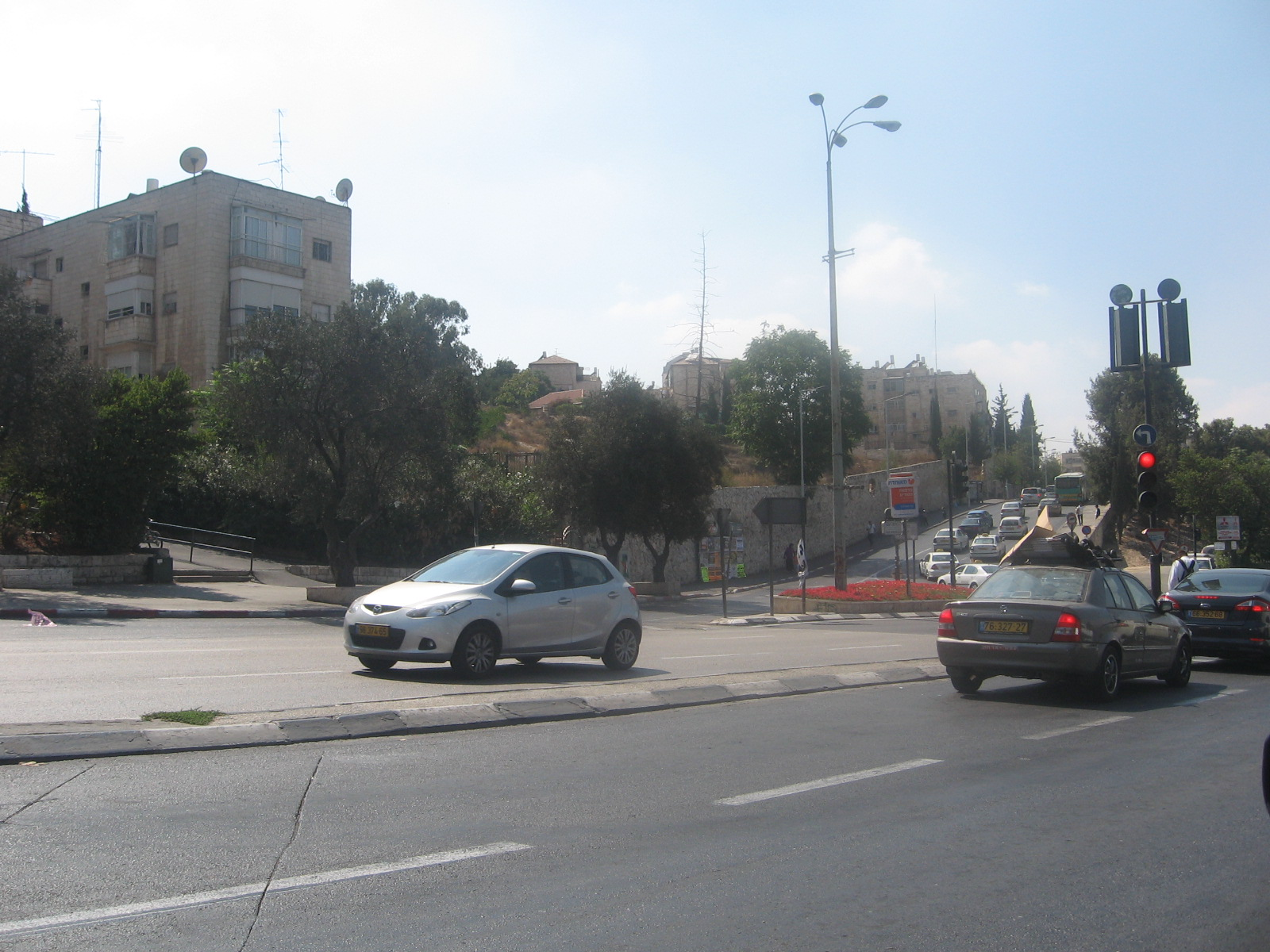
Entrance to Givat Shaul

According to a census conducted in 1931 by the British Mandate authorities, Givat Shaul had a population of 966 inhabitants, in 152 inhabited houses.

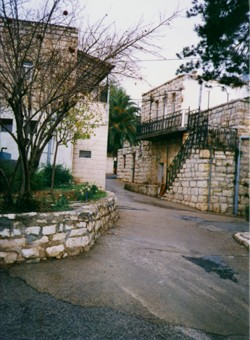
Kfar Shaul Mental Health Center

A long, dirt track separated Givat Shaul from a cluster of Arab villages, including Deir Yassin, with whom the Jews maintained good relations. In late 1946, the Haganah straightened and paved the dirt track in order to use it as a landing strip. During the Battle for Jerusalem in 1948, the Haganah flew in supplies, armaments, food, and troops on this runway. After the war, this road became known as Kanfei Nesharim Street.

In January 1948, the leaders of Givat Shaul met with the mukhtar of Deir Yassin to work out a non-aggression pact: if armed militia entered Deir Yassin, the villagers would hang out laundry in a certain sequence or place lanterns in a particular location. In return, patrols from Givat Shaul guaranteed safe passage to Deir Yassin residents, in vehicles or on foot, passing through their neighborhood on the way to Jerusalem. Over time, Deir Yassin became a halfway site for Arab forces moving from Ein Karem and Malha to al-Qastal and Kolonia, which overlooked the Jerusalem-Tel Aviv highway.

Amidst rumours that Deir Yassin was an active terrorist base, on 9 April, 1948, the village was attacked by paramilitary Israeli Irgun and Lehi forces in what came to be known as the Deir Yassin Massacre. Present scholarship puts the death toll of Palestinian Arab villagers at around 110. The rumours about this massacre also contributed to the trigger of the 1948 Palestinian expulsion and flight.

In 1951, the depopulated buildings were used to house a therapeutic community of 300 patients called the Kfar Shaul Government Work Village for Mental Patients. The majority of patients were Holocaust survivors.

On 30 November 2023, it was the scene of a mass shooting by two Hamas fighters amid the Gaza war. The Palestinian gunmen were shot and killed by security forces and an armed civilian. Three Israelis were killed and six wounded.

== Industrial development ==
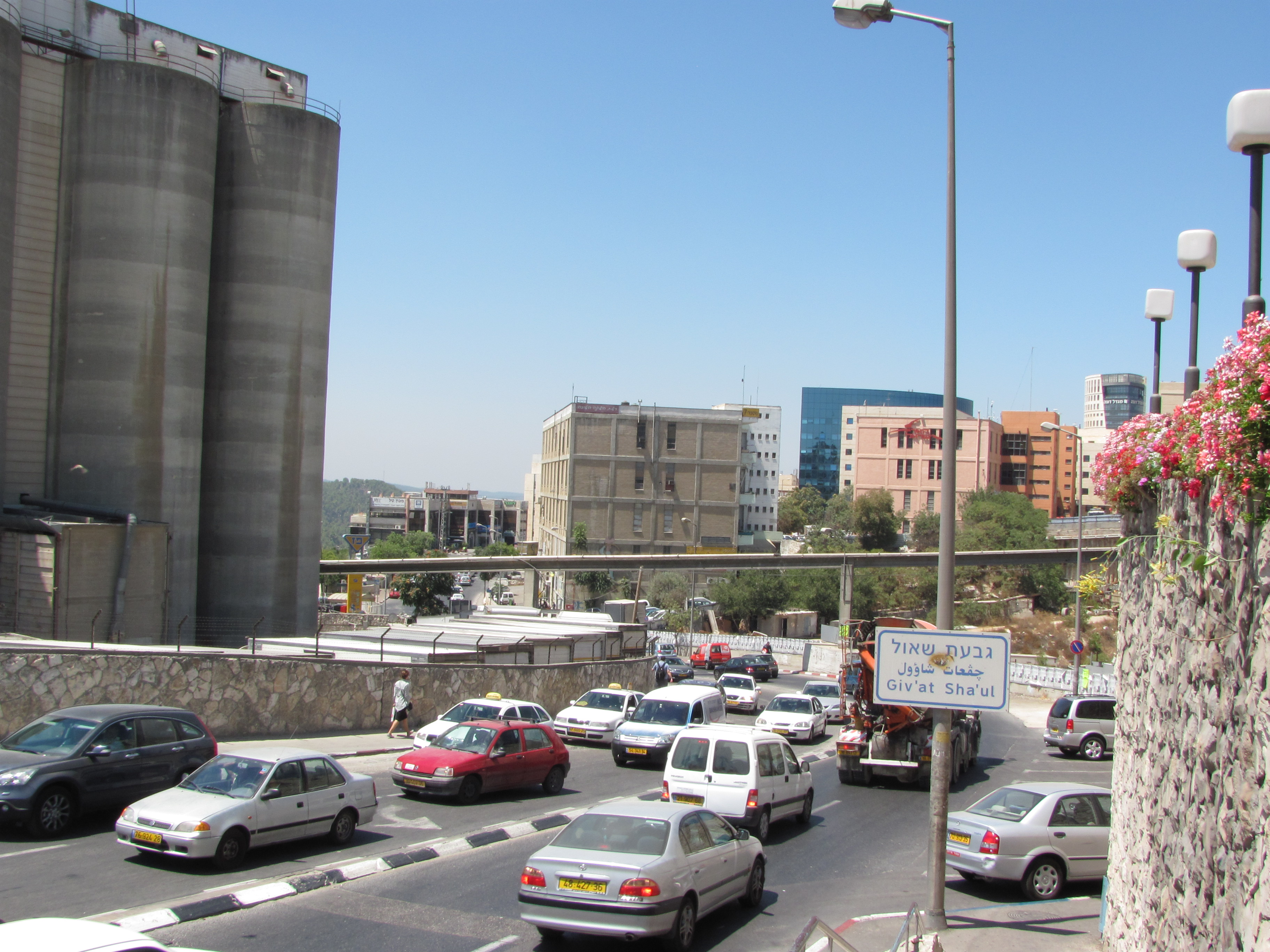
Partial view of Angel Bakeries' flour pipeline, which conveys flour directly from the flour mill to the silos (left) to the bakery (right), spanning Beit Hadfus Street in Givat Shaul.

After 1948, the Givat Shaul industrial zone expanded with factories and warehouses. Angel's Bakery moved to its present location here in 1958. The Angel brothers and co-CEOs Avraham, Ovadia, and Danny, commissioned a Texas company to construct a 750-foot pipeline to convey flour directly from the mill to the silo to the bakery. Today this pipeline brings 120 tons of flour to the bakery daily. The invention, initially opposed by the Jerusalem municipality for being above-ground, won the Kaplan Prize for distinction in productivity and efficiency. The bakery's landmark factory store opened in 1984.

Berman's Bakery, founded in 1875 by Mrs. Kreshe Berman as a cottage industry in the Old City, moved to its present location down the road from Angel's in 1965. A new street, Beit Hadfus Street, was constructed to reach the new bakery. This new street was named "Street of the Printing Press" for the many printing establishments also located here. These include two large book publishing houses, Keter Publishing House (established in 1958) and Feldheim Publishers, which established its Israel branch in the 1960s. Old City Press has operated here since 1969.

Since the late 1980s, aging industrial plants have been replaced by housing projects in Givat Shaul Bet.

== Demography ==
The population consists of a mix of Haredi and Religious Zionist Jews. The northernmost part of the neighborhood, directly above Highway 1, is mostly Haredi, while residents of the southern part, bordering Kiryat Moshe, are mostly Modern Orthodox Religious Zionists.

== Neighborhoods ==
=== Northern Givat Shaul ===
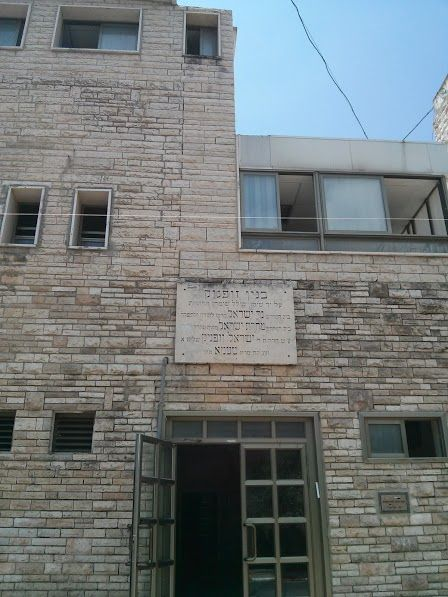
Zupnik - Ner Yisroel synagogue.

The northern part of Givat Shaul is populated mainly by Haredim, and the main street is closed to traffic on Shabbat and Jewish holidays. Several major synagogues are located here, including the Pressburg Yeshiva and neighborhood synagogue, and the Zupnik - Ner Yisroel synagogue, and the ivy Yeshiva, Ner Moshe, headed by Rabbi Avraham Gurewitz and Rabbi Shalom Shechter. The population consists of a mix of Hasidic, Litvishe and Sephardi/Mizrahi Haredim, and a small minority of National-Religious Jews. The rabbi of the Zupnik - Ner Yisroel synagogue is Avrohom Yitzchok Ulman, a senior member of the rabbinical high court, or Badatz, of the Edah HaChareidis. Other important rabbis living in Givat Shaul are Rabbi Yehoshua Karlinsky, rabbi of the Beer Avrohom synagogue; Rabbi Tennenbaum, rabbi of the Babad synagogue and Rabbi Shmuel Taussig, Admor of Toldos Shmuel.

=== Southern Givat Shaul ===
In the southern part of Givat Shaul, the population predominantly consists of Modern Orthodox Jews, affiliating with Religious Zionism. This section borders Kiryat Moshe and is often also referred to as such. Institutions in this area include the main synagogue of Rabbi Mordechai Eliyahu, a major center of Sephardic Religious Zionism, as well as the primarily Ashkenazi national-religious flagship Mercaz HaRav yeshiva.

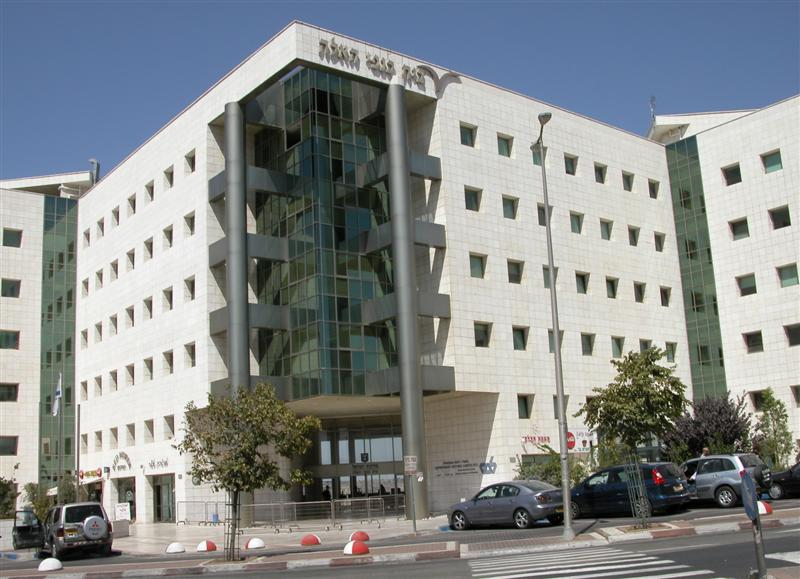
Israel Central Bureau of Statistics at the western end of Givat Shaul Bet.

=== Givat Shaul Bet ===
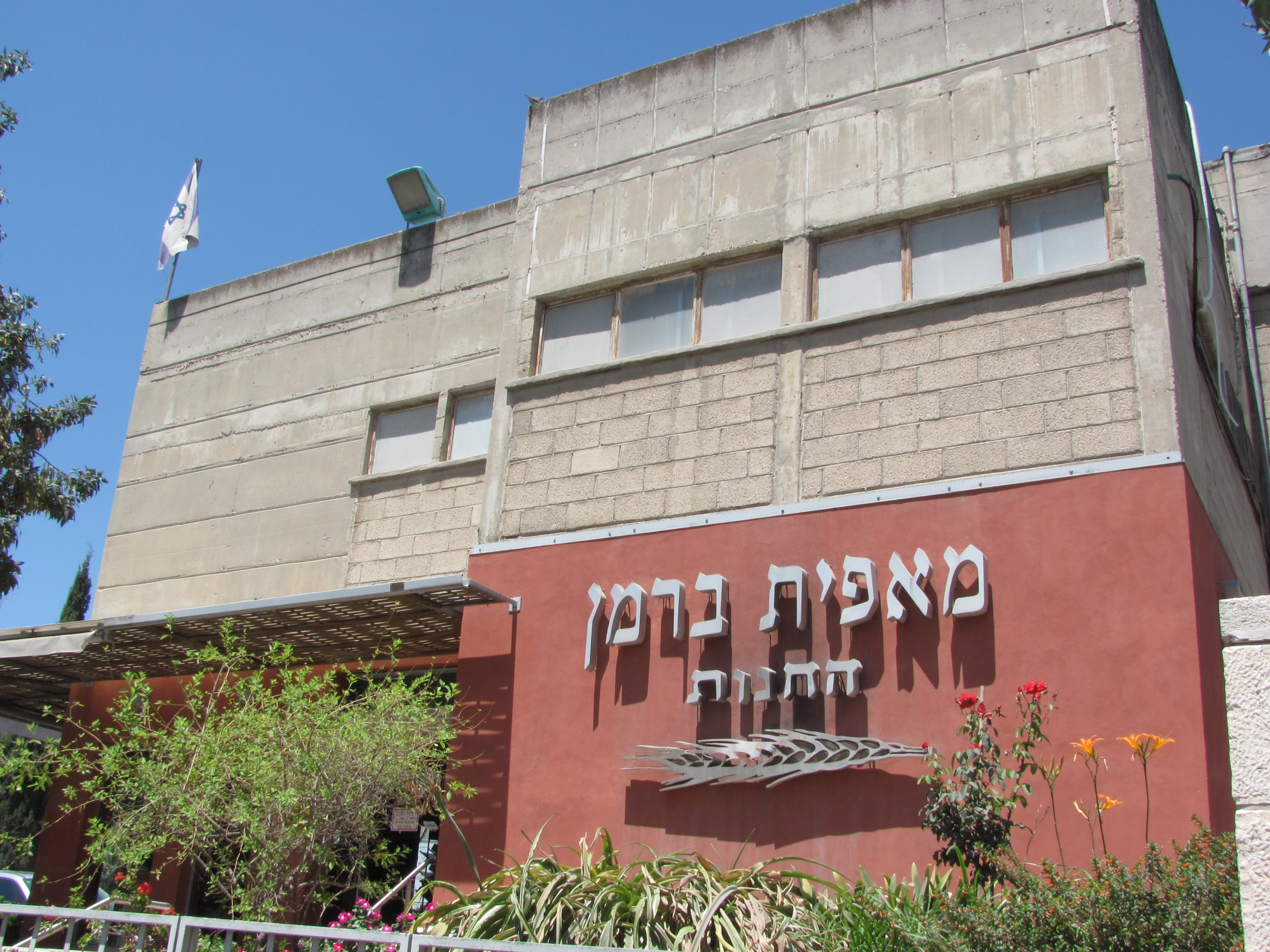
Berman bakery

The Givat Shaul industrial zone, sometimes referred to as Givat Shaul Bet, is situated on two parallel streets, Kanfei Nesharim and Beit Hadfus. While Kanfei Nesharim Street has developed into a modern shopping area with many chain stores and stylish office buildings, Beit Hadfus Street remains largely industrial with discount stores and outlets that attract bargain shoppers.

In recent years, low-cost wedding halls servicing the religious population of Jerusalem have opened in several office and industrial buildings on Beit Hadfus Street. Some of these are subsidized by major charity organizations to keep expenses down for low-income families. The Armonot Wolf (Wolf Palaces) wedding halls are affiliated with the Yad Eliezer charity organization, which subsidizes weddings for orphans here through its Adopt-a-Wedding campaign. The Gutnick Halls, funded by Australian philanthropist Joseph Gutnick and managed by Chabad, provide subsidized weddings for 440 needy couples annually through the Colel Chabad charity fund.

Government offices include the Ministry of Environmental Protection, the National Authority of Religious Services, the State Comptroller and Ombudsman, the Israel Securities Authority, the Income Tax Commission, the Israel Central Bureau of Statistics, the National Parks Authority, and the Ministry of Education.

The Israeli branch of Touro College and the Tal Institute, the women's division of the Jerusalem College of Technology, are also located in Givat Shaul.

== Givat Shaul cemetery ==
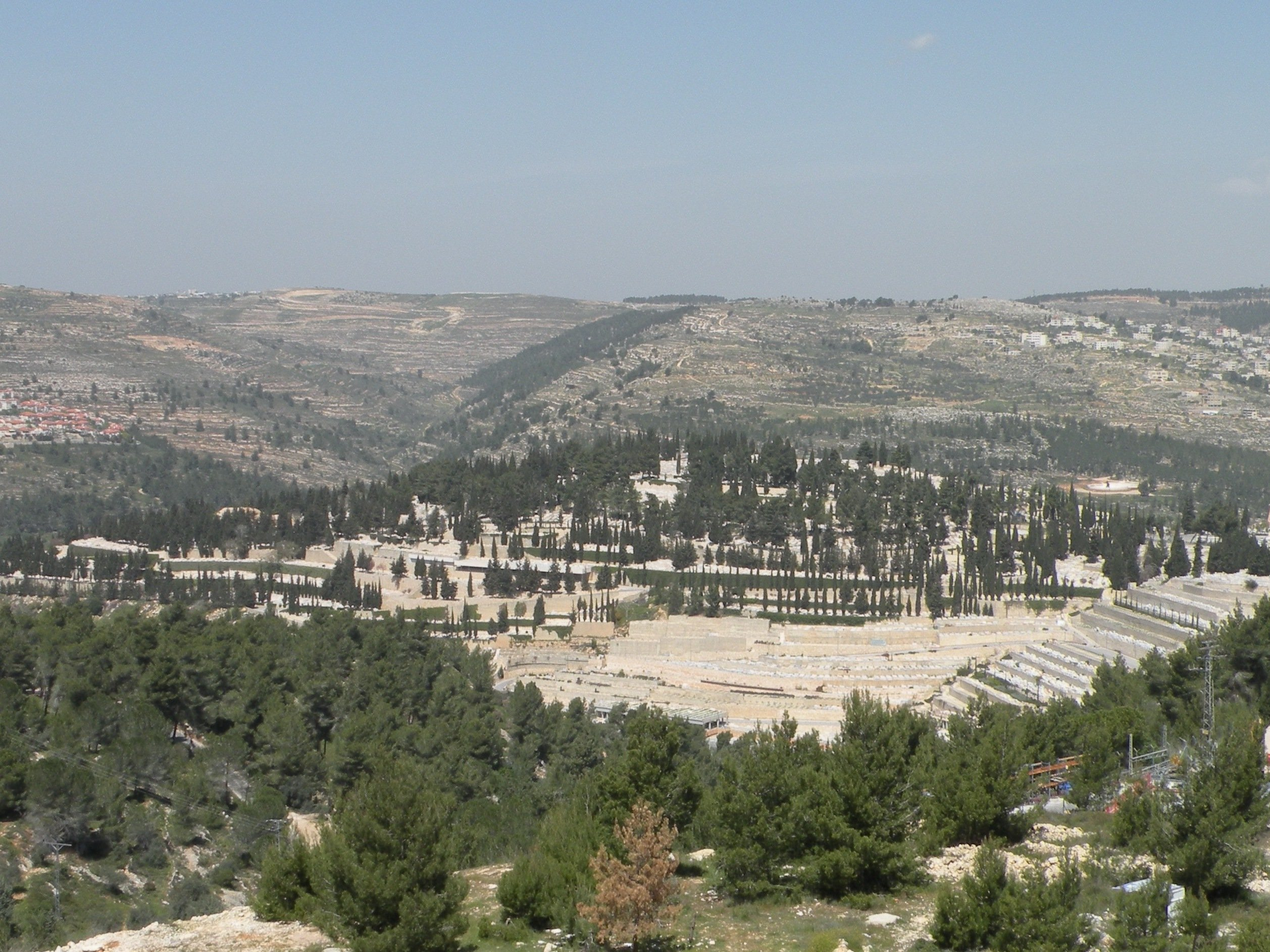
Har HaMenuchot cemetery

On the northwestern ridge of the neighborhood lies Har HaMenuchot, Jerusalem's largest cemetery. Between the northern section of Givat Shaul and the cemetery is another commercial zone consisting of several large stores and office buildings. The Herzog psychiatric hospital, Egged's bus maintenance facility, and the main depot for the Jerusalem municipality's sanitation services are also located here.

== Notable residents ==
- Mordechai Eliyahu
- Avrohom Yitzchok Ulman
- Shlomo Wolbe

== Companies based in Givat Shaul ==
- Angel Bakeries
- Berman's Bakery
- Kramer Electronics, Ltd.
- Feldheim Publishers
- Keter Publishing House
- Yehuda Matzos
