= Naomi Ragen =

American-Israeli author and playwright

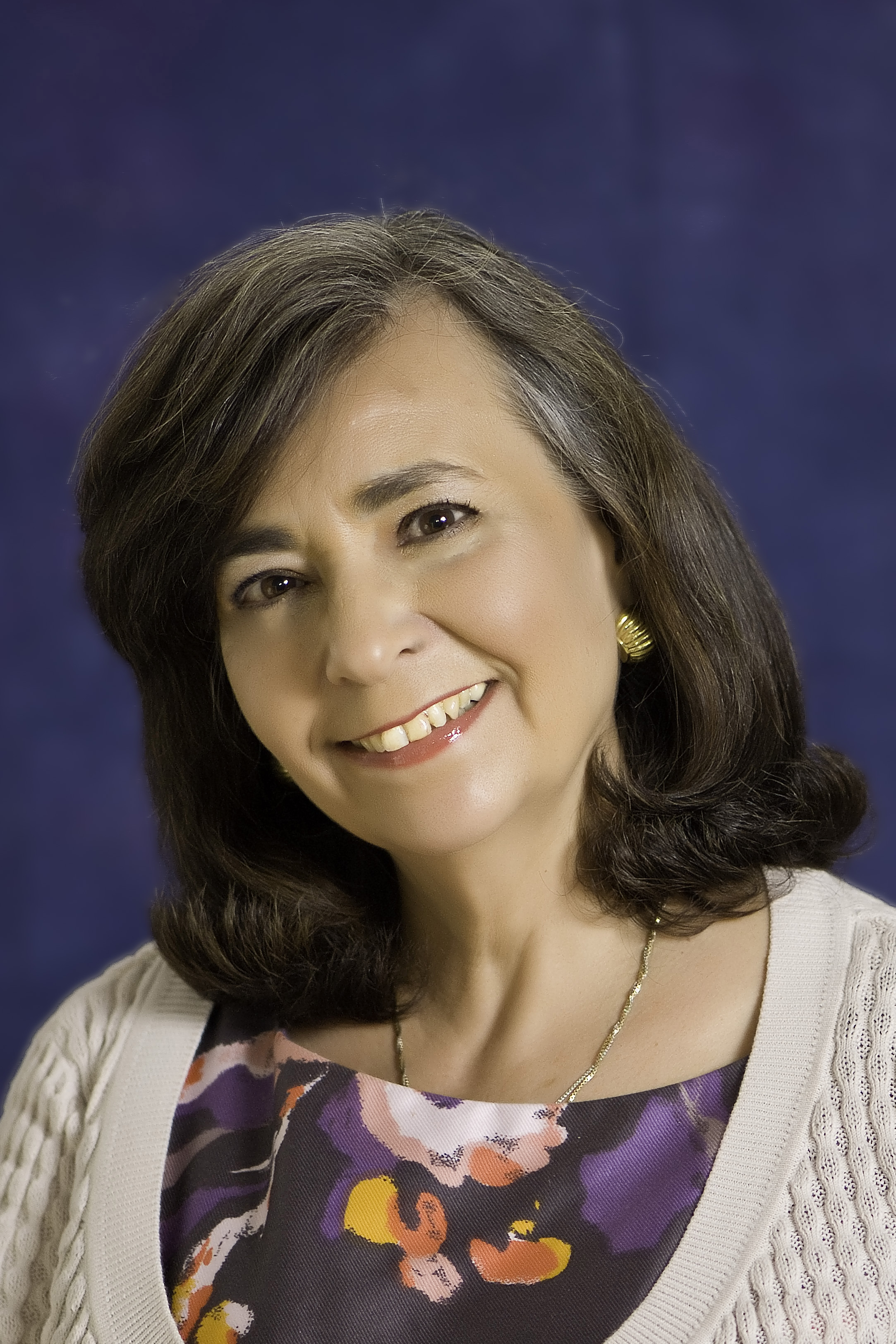
Naomi Ragen

Naomi Ragen (Hebrew: נעמי רגן; born July 10, 1949) is an American-Israeli modern-Orthodox Jewish author and playwright. Ragen lives in Jerusalem, and writes in English. A recurring theme in her fictional works is injustice against women in the Haredi Jewish community. Ragen has been the subject of various lawsuits over claims of plagiarism.

== Biography ==
Naomi Ragen (née Terlinsky) was born in New York City. She received an Orthodox Jewish education before completing a bachelor's degree in literature at Brooklyn College. In 1971, she moved to Israel with her husband. In 1978, she received a master's degree in literature from the Hebrew University of Jerusalem.

She has four children and lives in Jerusalem.

== Literary career ==
Ragen's first three novels describe the lives of Haredi Jewish women in Israel and the United States, dealing with themes that had not previously been addressed in that society's literature: wife-abuse (Jephte's Daughter: 1989), adultery (Sotah: 1992), and rape (The Sacrifice of Tamar: 1995).

Her next novel (The Ghost of Hannah Mendes: 1998) is the story of a Sephardic family brought back from assimilation by the spirit of their ancestor Gracia Mendes, a 16th-century Portuguese crypto-Jew.

Chains Around the Grass (2002) is a semi-autobiographical novel dealing with the failure of the American dream.

In The Covenant (2004), Ragen deals with an ordinary family confronted with Islamic terrorism.

The Saturday Wife (2007), the story of a rabbi's wayward wife, is loosely based on Flaubert’s Madame Bovary, and is a satire of modern Jewish Orthodoxy.

The Tenth Song (2010) is the story of a family whose life is shattered when a false accusation of terrorism is made against the father.

The Sisters Weiss (2013) is a novel about two sisters born into an ultra-Orthodox family in 1950s Brooklyn who choose very different paths in life.

The Devil in Jerusalem (2015) is a mystery featuring Detective Bina Tzedek investigating a corrupt haredi cult rabbi.

An Unorthodox Match (2019) a novel set in the ultraorthodox community of Boro Park, Brooklyn, in which a secular Jewish woman adopts a haredi lifestyle and marries a haredi widower.

An Observant Wife (2021) is a sequel to An Unorthodox Match.

=== Theater ===
Women's Minyan (2001) is a play about a Haredi woman fleeing from her adulterous and abusive husband. She finds that he has manipulated the rabbinical courts to deprive her of the right to see or speak to her twelve children. The story is based on a true incident. Women’s Minyan ran for six years in Habima (Israel's National Theatre) and has been staged in the United States, Canada and Argentina.

In 2026, plans for a revival of the show with the Chicago-based Arts Judaica were canceled. Elayne LeTraunik, the company’s artistic director, told Ragen that “People were seeing you were a pro Zionist Jew/Israeli and I was bombarded with actors, directors and designers who were actually afraid that doing a show with you as playwright would hurt their careers."

=== Columnist ===
Ragen was also a columnist for The Jerusalem Post.

== Plagiarism lawsuits ==
=== Michal Tal ===
In 2007, Michal Tal, an American-Israeli writer, claimed that lines and sentences contained in Tal's novel The Lion and the Cross were plagiarized in Naomi Ragen's novel The Ghost of Hannah Mendes. Ragen vigorously denied the accusation and charged that Tal's "Table of Similarities" was riddled with fabricated quotes from both of the books. Tal died mid-trial, before a verdict was reached. The court set aside the unfinished trial with a provision that it could be reopened by Tal's descendants if they so desired in future. In 2010, Jerusalem District Court judge Yosef Shapira ruled that since Tal's descendants did not wish to continue with the litigation, the claim would be dismissed. In 2012, the Israeli Supreme Court ruled there was no basis to the claim.

=== Sarah Shapiro ===
In 2007, Sarah Shapiro brought a claim against Ragen which alleged that Ragen had plagiarized from Shapiro's book Growing with My Children in her novel Sotah. Ragen acknowledged at the trial that she had read Shapiro's book two or three years before writing her own, but she had not copied the sentences and ideas. On 11 December 2011, Judge Shapira upheld the plagiarism claim. Shapiro had asked for NIS 1 million in damages, and the court ordered the parties to negotiate the amount to be awarded. It also indicated it would decide at a later date the copyright infringement claim. On 27 March 2012, Ragen and Shapiro reached a settlement, and Ragen was ordered to pay Shapiro 233,000 NIS.

In June 2012, Ragen appealed the District Court's decision to the Supreme Court, claiming that it set a precedent that would deny Israeli writers freedom of expression. On 6 November 2013, the Israeli Supreme Court upheld the District Court's judgment regarding Ragen's plagiarism. The Supreme Court judge requested that "for the sake of peace between the two parties", Shapiro's award be donated to a charity of Shapiro's choice, a request to which Shapiro acquiesced. Ragen still had to pay Shapiro's attorneys and Ragen is still subject to an injunction against reprinting Sotah without removing all plagiarized text, an approximate total of 25 sentences. Shapiro chose to donate the 97,000 shekels personal award, not including Ragen's payment of Shapiro's legal costs, to Yad Eliezer and Yad Sarah.

=== Sudy Rosengarten ===
In November 2014, Ragen was found liable for plagiarism for copying content from Sudy Rosengarten's short story "A Marriage Made in Heaven" which had been published in "The Our Lives Anthology" edited by Sarah Shapiro. Ragen had claimed that she had only used Rosengarten's work as literary inspiration, and that the few sentence fragments at issue constituted an insignificant portion of her full length novel. Ragen was ordered to pay 73,000 NIS to Rosengarten.
