= The Bamboo Cradle =

1988 biographical story

- Author: Avraham Schwartzbaum
- Genre: Biography
- Publisher: Feldheim Publishers
- Publication date: 1988

The Bamboo Cradle is a biographical story written by Avraham Schwartzbaum about his adopted Taiwanese daughter Devorah, who converted to Judaism at age four.

First published in 1988 by Feldheim Publishers, the inspirational story tracks the story of Allen/Avraham and Barbara/Rachel Schwartzbaum as they become more devout Jews after adopting a foundling in a Taiwan train station. The book was translated by Ruth Feldheim into Hebrew as "מסין לסיני: עריסת הבמבוק" (From China to Sinai: The Bamboo Cradle) and published the same year. It was also translated into French by Daniel Halevy and published in 1990 under the title "Le Berceau de Bambou".

== Synopsis ==
Allan Schwartzbaum tells the story of his time spent in Taiwan as a visiting professor from the United States on a Fulbright Scholarship teaching sociology. After nine years of marriage, he and his wife did not have children, despite wanting and trying to conceive. One day, on his way to work, he finds an abandoned baby girl in a train station and brings her to the station manager. He and his wife regret giving her to the station manager, and decide to find her in order to adopt her. They find her in the possession of a baby-selling ring masquerading as an orphanage and are eventually able to adopt her. After several more months, they return to the United States. In the US they research how to convert their new daughter. During their research they discover Judaism as a more meaningful lifestyle than they had realized before. Because of their adopted daughter, they traveled on a journey to becoming seriously observant, bringing up Devorah according to the strict laws of Judaism, and even eventually conceiving biological children.
