= Berman's Bakery =

Oldest commercial bakery in Israel

- Industry: Bakery
- Founded: 1875
- Founder: Kreshe Berman
- Headquarters: Jerusalem, Israel
- Area served: Israel
- Key people: Yitzchak Berman, CEO; Yehuda Schneidman, Operating Manager
- Products: Breads, rolls, pita, challah, cakes, pies, cookies, pastries
- Number of employees: 400+
- Parent: Mishkei Harei Yehuda
- Website: www.berman.co.il

Berman's Bakery (Hebrew: מאפית ברמן Mafiat Berman) is the oldest commercial bakery in Israel and the second-largest after Angel Bakeries. Founded in 1875 by Kreshe Berman as a cottage industry in Jerusalem's Old City, the family business was the first to open a Jewish store outside the Old City walls and first to build a flour mill in Israel.

Berman's Bakery moved to the Mea Shearim neighbourhood of Jerusalem in the late nineteenth century, where it operated as the country's largest through two world wars and the 1948 Arab-Israeli war. In 1965 it moved to its present location in the Givat Shaul neighborhood. Here it employs over 400 workers and services 2,000 stores, supermarkets and institutions countrywide.

In 2007 the company was purchased by the Mishkei Harei Yehuda agricultural cooperative. At that time it reported revenues of ₪300 million annually.

== History ==
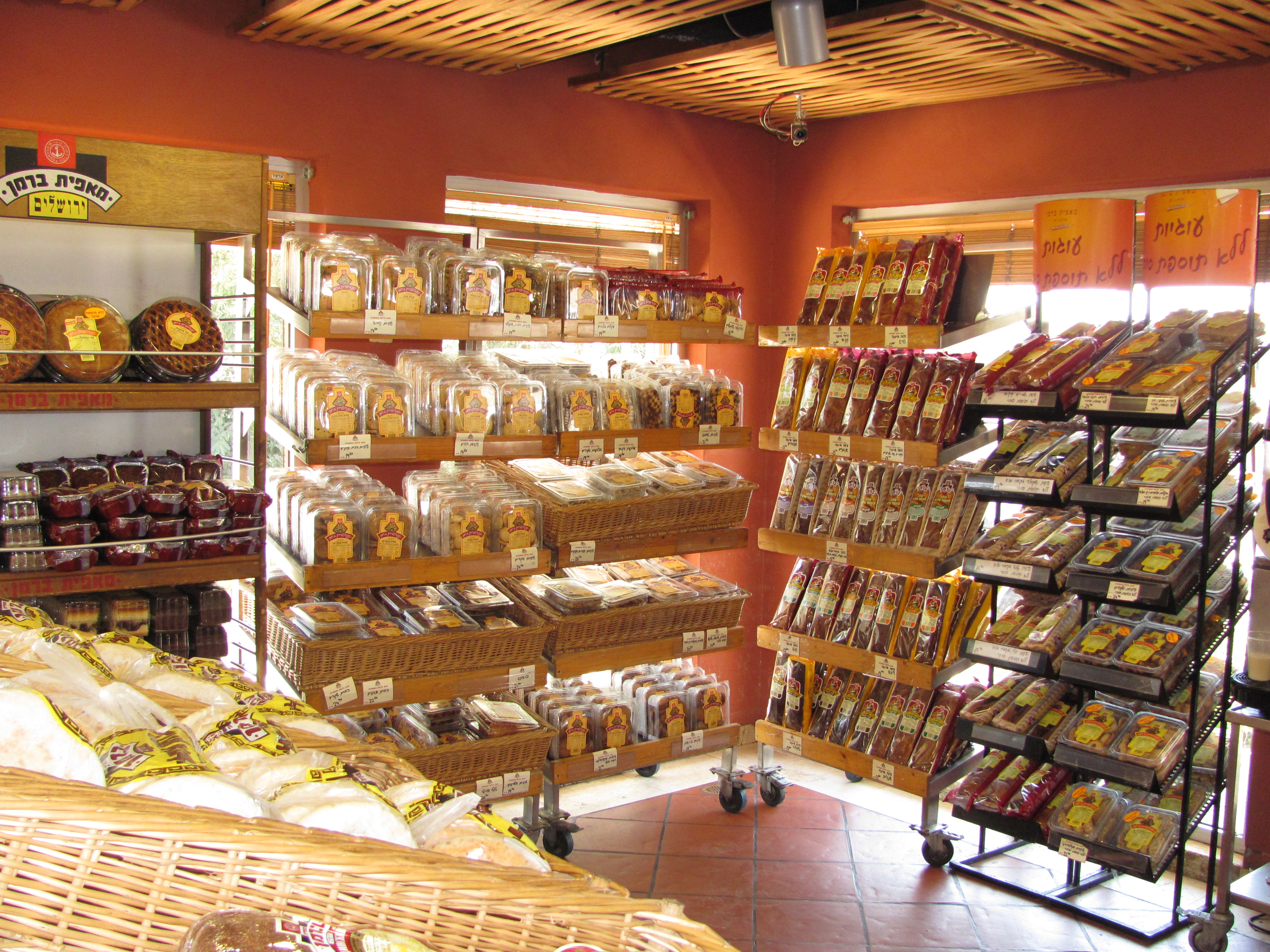
Breads and cakes for sale at the Berman's Bakery retail bread shop and patisserie in Givat Shaul, Jerusalem.

Berman's Bakery began as a cottage industry established by Kreshe Berman (1829–1933), who, together with her husband Todrus HaLevi Berman (1807–1887) and two small sons, Yehoshua (Joshua) (1861–1939) and Eliyahu (1867–1951), immigrated to the Old City of Jerusalem from Lithuania in 1876. While Todrus, a full-time Torah scholar, studied in the Etz Chaim Yeshiva adjacent to the Hurva Synagogue, Kreshne supported the family (two girls, Rachel and Rivka, were born in Jerusalem) by operating a small grocery store on the Street of the Jews.

When their savings ran out, Kreshne began looking for ways to increase business. She began baking honey cakes and peddling them to the thousands of Christian pilgrims who came to Jerusalem annually before Christmas and remained there until after Easter. Often she stood at Jaffa Gate or at Lions' Gate, peddling to pilgrims on their way to the Church of the Holy Sepulchre. Once a pilgrim asked her if she sold Russian black bread. Kreshe experimented with different formulas until she developed her own dark bread by adding carob paste to locally made grain. Her sales of honey cake and black bread grew so much that her son Yehoshua left yeshiva to help her manage the business.

=== Jaffa Road store ===
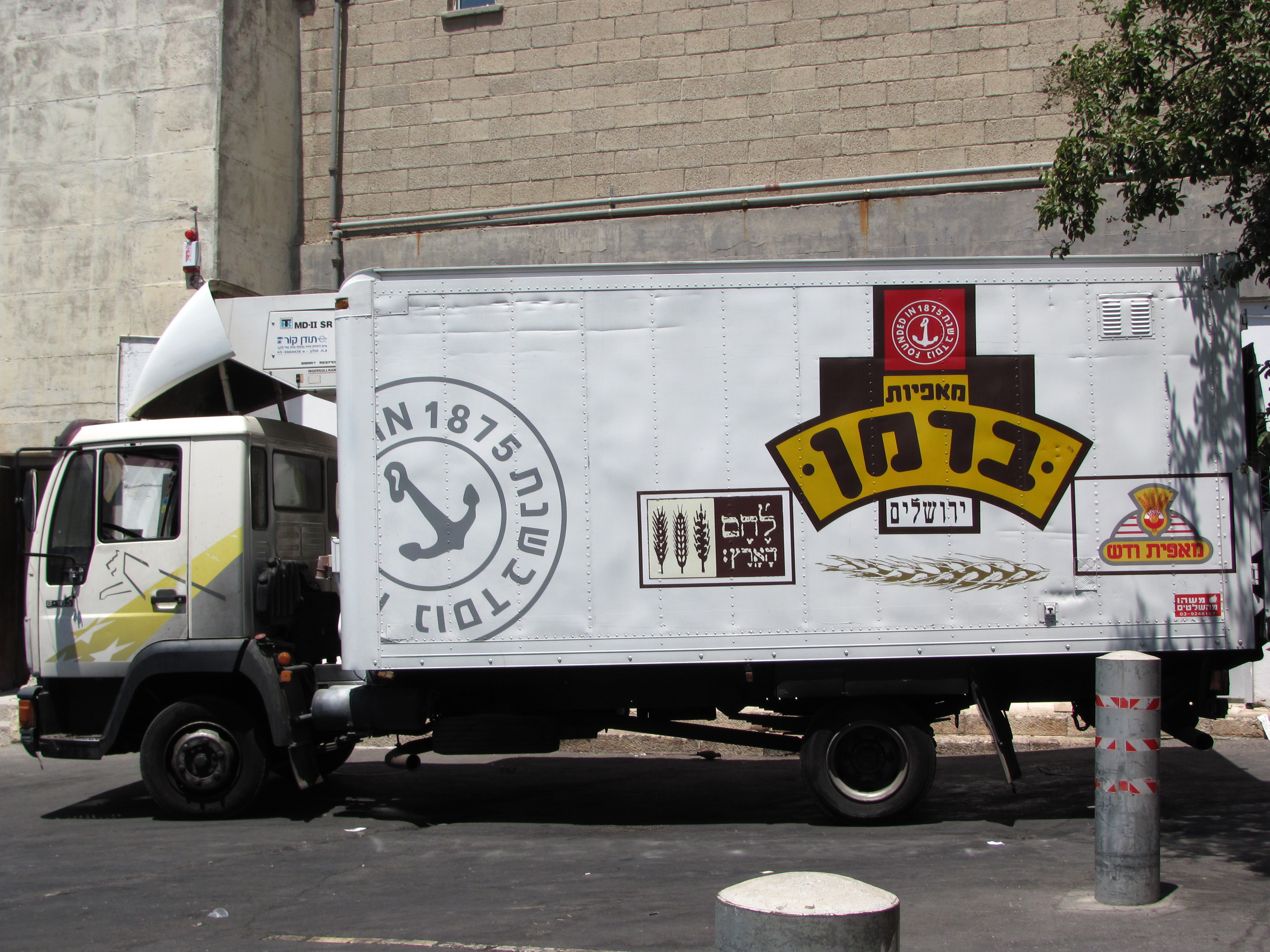
Berman's Bakery delivery truck with company logo and date of establishment

During the pilgrimage off-season, Yehoshua went door-to-door selling his mother's bread to local residents. The business continued to prosper and in 1882 Yehoshua opened the first Jewish store outside the Old City walls, in a line of shops erected outside Jaffa Gate. He transported the bakery goods by horse and mule from the Old City to the store, using Austrian army surplus wagons. As these wagons were emblazoned with an anchor, the insignia of an Austrian army unit, people began associating the insignia with the Berman bakery. Berman's eventually incorporated this anchor into the bakery's logo.

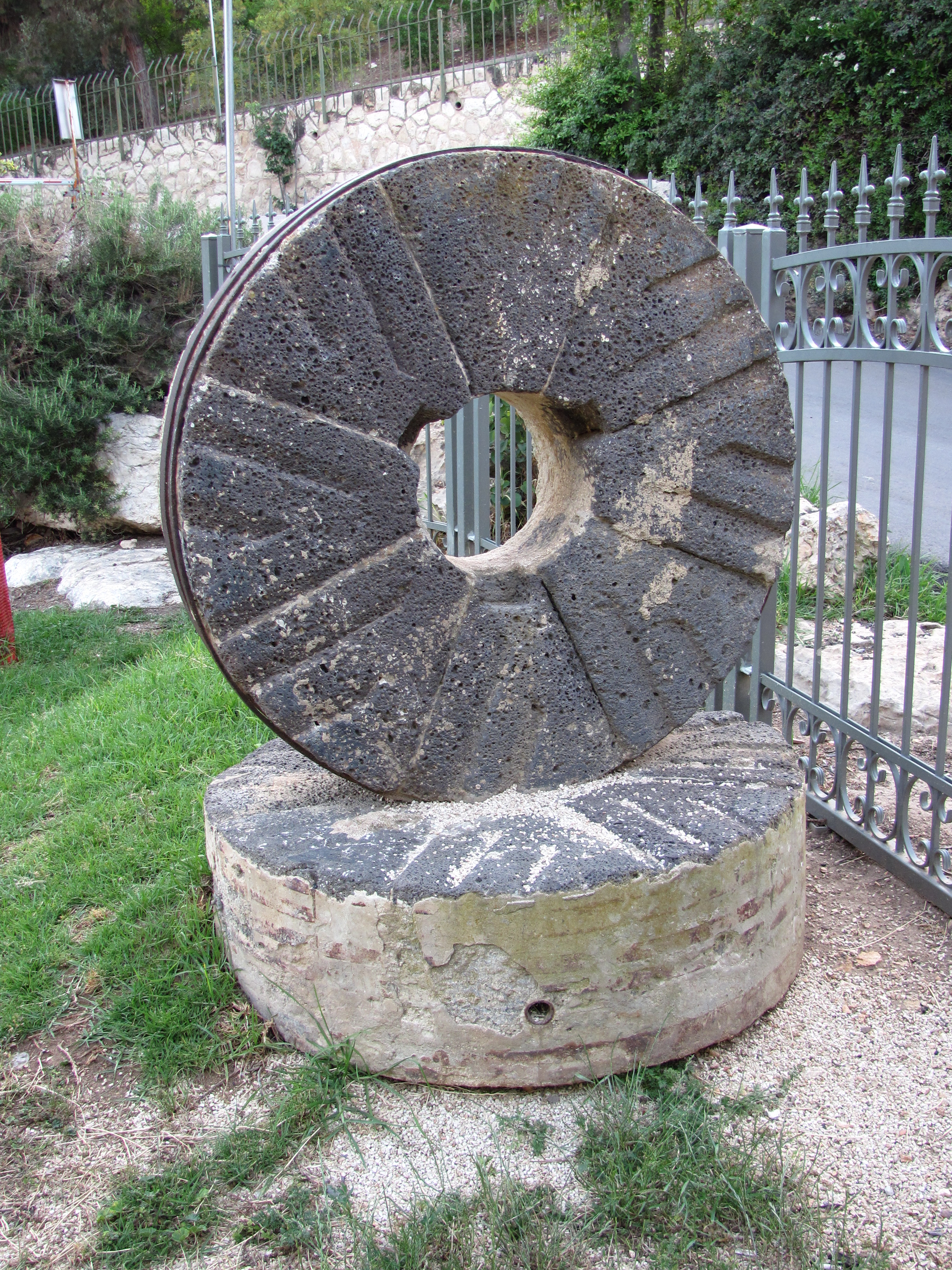
The millstones.

Yehoshua Berman also built the city's first flour mill in 1886, north of Mishkenot Sha'ananim, which operated until the 1948 Arab-Israeli war turned that area into a no man's land. Two huge millstones still stand at the former site, which is at the end of the two rows of artisan's galleries on the Street of the Craftsmen.

=== Move to Mea Shearim ===
As Jewish settlement expanded beyond the Old City walls in the late nineteenth century, the Berman family relocated to the new Mea Shearim neighborhood, where they built a bakery adjoining their house. Yehoshua encouraged his brother Eliyahu to join the business, and they officially named it J. and E. Berman Ltd.

From 1917 to 1948, the British Mandate government was a regular customer of Berman's Bakery. During the 1948 war, the bakery, which lay close to the Jordanian border, was a frequent target of bombing attempts. Despite the Arab siege of Jerusalem and severe flour and gasoline rationing, Berman's Bakery continued to supply Jerusalem residents with fresh bread throughout the war.

=== Move to Givat Shaul ===
In 1965 Berman's Bakery moved to its present location on Beit Hadfus Street in the Givat Shaul industrial zone, down the street from the Angel's Bakery which had opened there in 1958. A new road had to be paved to reach the new bakery. The nearly 10,000-square-meter factory is fully automated, producing nearly 3,000 loaves of bread per hour and requiring no human input from production through baking through slicing and packaging.

Also in 1965, Yitzchak Berman, a great-grandson of Kreshe, began working in the bakery following his stint in the IDF paratroopers unit. After working in every capacity in the bakery, he became managing director of the company. He appointed his childhood friend, Yehuda Schneidman, as operating manager. Yitzchak's daughters, Teda and Avital, and his son-in-law Gabi Mazurzski, also work in the family business.

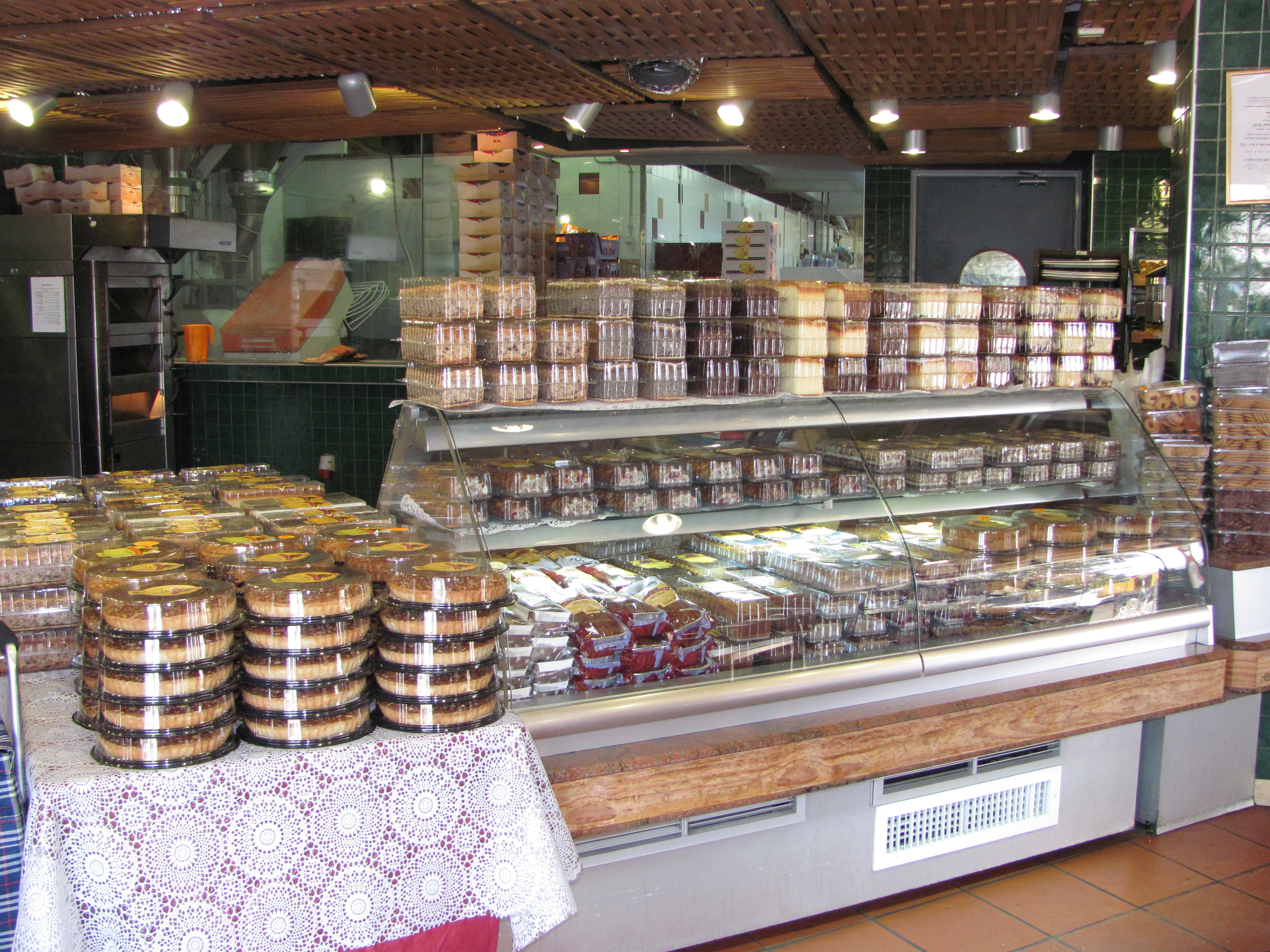
Cakes and pies on display at the Berman's Bakery retail store in Givat Shaul.

In 1999 the company opened a retail bread shop and pâtisserie at its factory location. This store displays full lines of packaged and unpackaged breads, rolls, pitas, cakes and pies, plus a large refrigerated selection of pastries, and sale of hot and cold drinks. Aproned pastry makers can be seen at work through plastic windows at the back of the shop.

=== Acquisitions ===
In 2001 Berman's Bakery purchased Lechem HaAretz Bakery, producer of specialty and health-food breads, and Vadash Bakery of Ramat HaSharon, producer of breads, rolls and crumb coatings. With these acquisitions, Berman's became the second-largest bakery in the country.

=== Sale ===
In 2007 CEO and controlling shareholder Yitzchak Berman sold all his holdings to agricultural cooperative Mishkei Harei Yehuda for ₪350 million.

== Product line ==
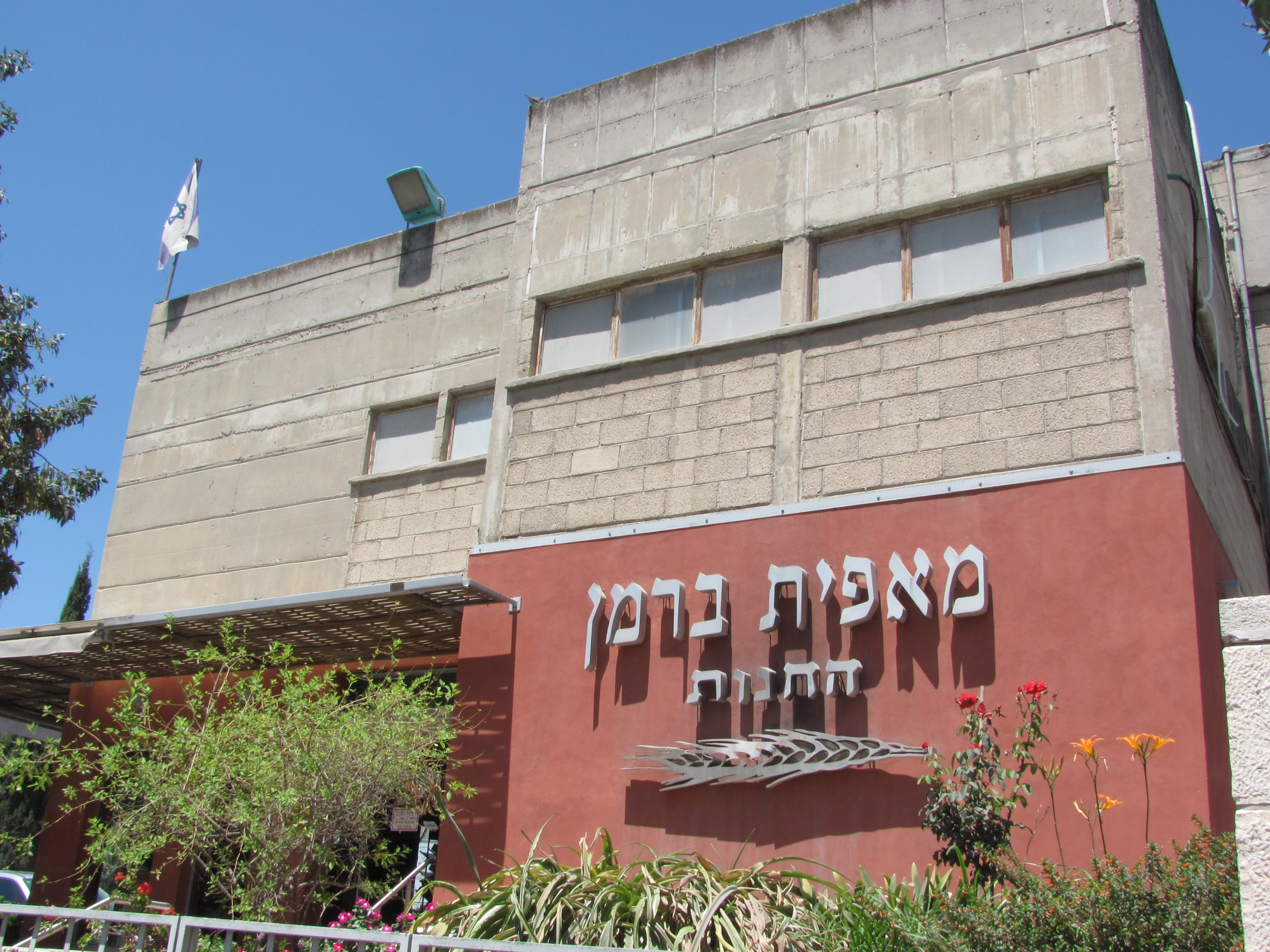
Berman's Bakery retail store in Givat Shaul.

- Light breads
- Wholemeal breads
- Challah
- Cakes
- Rolls
- Packaged rolls and pitas

== Distribution ==
Currently Berman's Bakery distributes to more than 2,000 stores, supermarkets and institutions throughout Israel. It employs 400 workers and operates a fleet of 60 delivery trucks.

== See also ==
- List of bakeries
