= Angel Bakeries =

Largest commercial bakery in Israel

Coordinates: 31°47′14″N 35°11′30″E

- Company type: Public (TASE: ANGL)
- Industry: Bakery
- Founded: 1927; 99 years ago
- Founder: Salomon Angel
- Headquarters: Israel
- Area served: Israel, North America, Europe
- Key people: Yaron Angel, CEO, Director; Yigal Hayet, Vice President, Director; Gadi Angel, Co-CEO, Production
- Products: Breads, rolls, challah, cakes, cookies, pastries, muffins
- Number of employees: 1,800
- Website: www.angel.co.il

Angel Bakeries (Hebrew: מאפיות אנג'ל Ma'afiyot Anjel), also known as Angel's Bakery, is the largest commercial bakery in Israel, producing 275,000 loaves of bread and 275,000 rolls daily and controlling 30 percent of the country's bread market. With a product line of 100 different types of bread products and 250 different types of cakes and cookies, Angel sells its goods in 32 company-owned outlets nationwide and distributes to 6,000 stores and hundreds of hotels and army bases. It also exports to the United States, United Kingdom, France, Belgium and Denmark.

Founded in 1927 in Jerusalem, Mandatory Palestine by Salomon Angel, Angel Bakeries introduced to the Israeli market the first sliced bread, plant-based emulsifiers, and new baking technologies. It has always been family-run, at first by Salomon with his brothers and sons, then by Salomon's grandsons, and today by Salomon's great-grandsons. The company, Salomon A. Angel Ltd., is publicly traded on the Tel Aviv Stock Exchange, with a turnover of $180 million in 2008.

== History ==
The original Angel's Bakery was established in Bayit VeGan by Salomon (Shlomo) Angel, a seventh-generation Jerusalemite and scion of a Sephardi family that traced its lineage back to Jews who were expelled from Spain in 1492. Born in the Mishkenot Sha'ananim neighborhood of Jerusalem, Angel was originally a teacher in an Alliance school in Jerusalem, where he fell in love with the principal's daughter. But principal Chaim Farhi would only allow him to marry his daughter, Esther, if he left teaching and "earned a livelihood". Salomon agreed and became a dry-goods merchant. The couple married in 1916 and had three sons and three daughters.

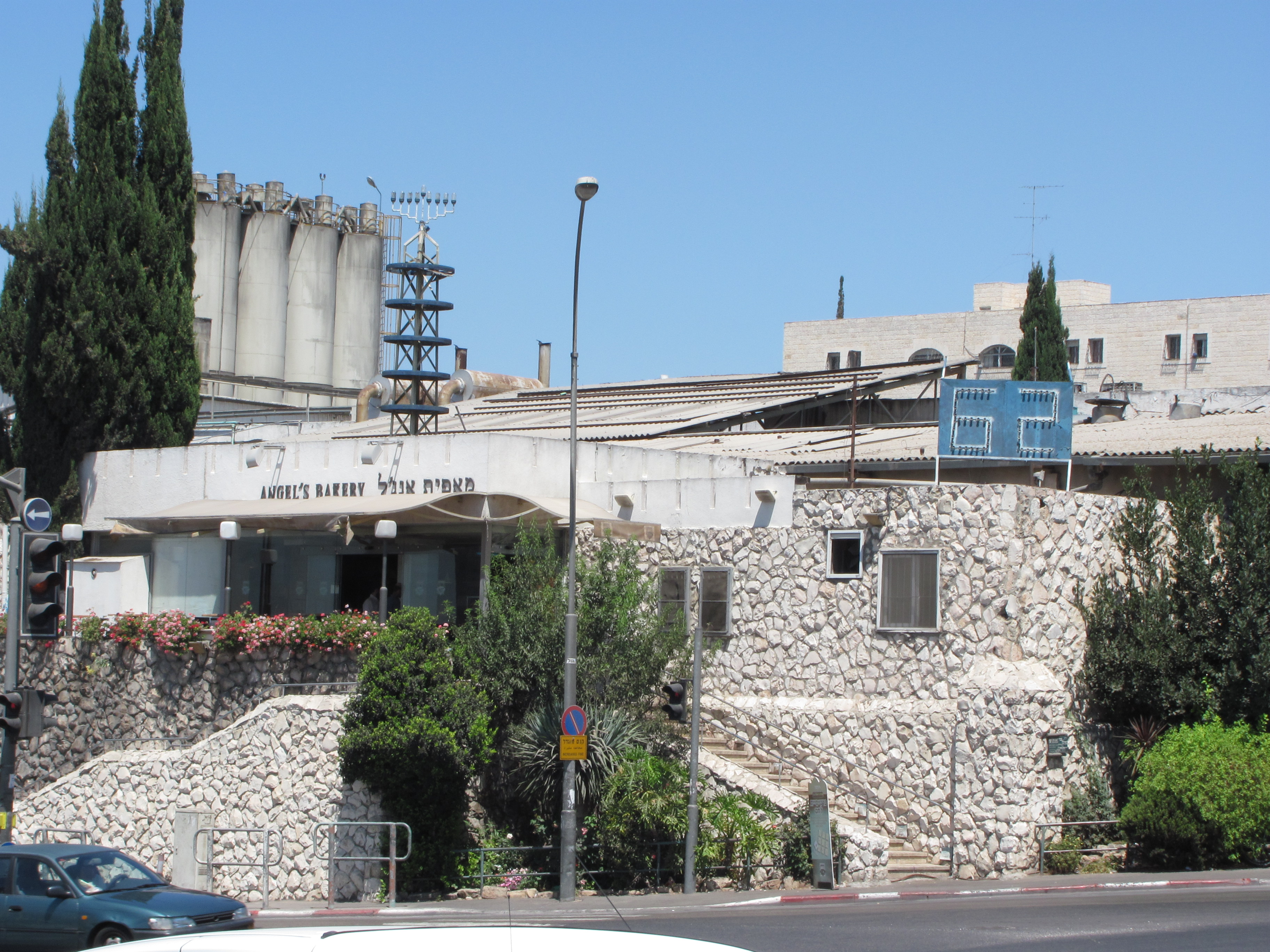
The landmark Angel's Bakery factory store in Givat Shaul. The light board with the number "62" indicates 62 years since the establishment of the State of Israel.

Angel became a successful dry-goods merchant, traveling regularly to Alexandria, Damascus, and Beirut to buy flour and other basic foodstuffs to sell in Jerusalem. In 1927 one of Angel's customers, the Trachtenberg Bakery in Bayit VeGan, went bankrupt. Angel decided to pay off the bakery's debts and assume ownership, bringing in his father Avraham and three brothers as partners. A few years later, two of his brothers, Leon and Refael, left to open their own bakery in Haifa.

Angel improved the bread-making operation by introducing Israel's first automated weighing machines and investing in new production lines. He often slept overnight at the bakery during the week and returned to his home in Talpiot when the bakery was closed on Shabbat. Later he built an apartment over the bakery to house his family. In the 1930s, the bakery employed 25 workers and had one production line that turned out 8,500 loaves per day. It delivered bread to stores in two trucks and a horse and wagon. During World War II, the bakery contracted to supply bread to the British army, necessitating the purchase of large American-made ovens that could turn out 540 loaves per hour.

Angel's Bakery played a key role in feeding Jerusalem residents during the 1948 War of Independence. When Arabs lay siege to the city and attacked convoys that attempted to bring food and supplies through the narrow mountain pass from Tel Aviv, water and flour were in short supply. Fire trucks were employed to shuttle water to the bakery and "flour was swept up off the bakery floor". Angel's son Danny, who was a Haganah fighter defending the besieged Old City, recalled that the bakery would send bread in convoys to the fighters in the Old City and Mount Scopus, and hide guns and ammunition in the sacks of bread. One of the first horses used for the Jewish assault on the Arabs' Old City positions came from Angel's Bakery; its feet were wrapped in old flour sacks so the British wouldn't detect it. The bakery is so well known that it is even depicted in the popular children's book Soosie, The Horse That Saved Shabbat by Tami Lehman-Wilzig, illustrated by notable Israeli artist Menahem Halberstadt (published in the US by Kalaniot Books).

In May 2023, former Labor politician and public security minister Omer Bar-Lev, who was the chairman of the board of directors of Angel Bakery at the time, took part in a protest outside the home of one of the foremost Haredi leaders in Israel, Rabbi Gershon Edelstein, which many in the religious community felt was an affront to the rabbi's honor. As a result, religious leaders across Israel called for a boycott of the company until Bar-Lev was fired, with many large Yeshivas canceling their contracts with the firm.

=== New baking technologies ===
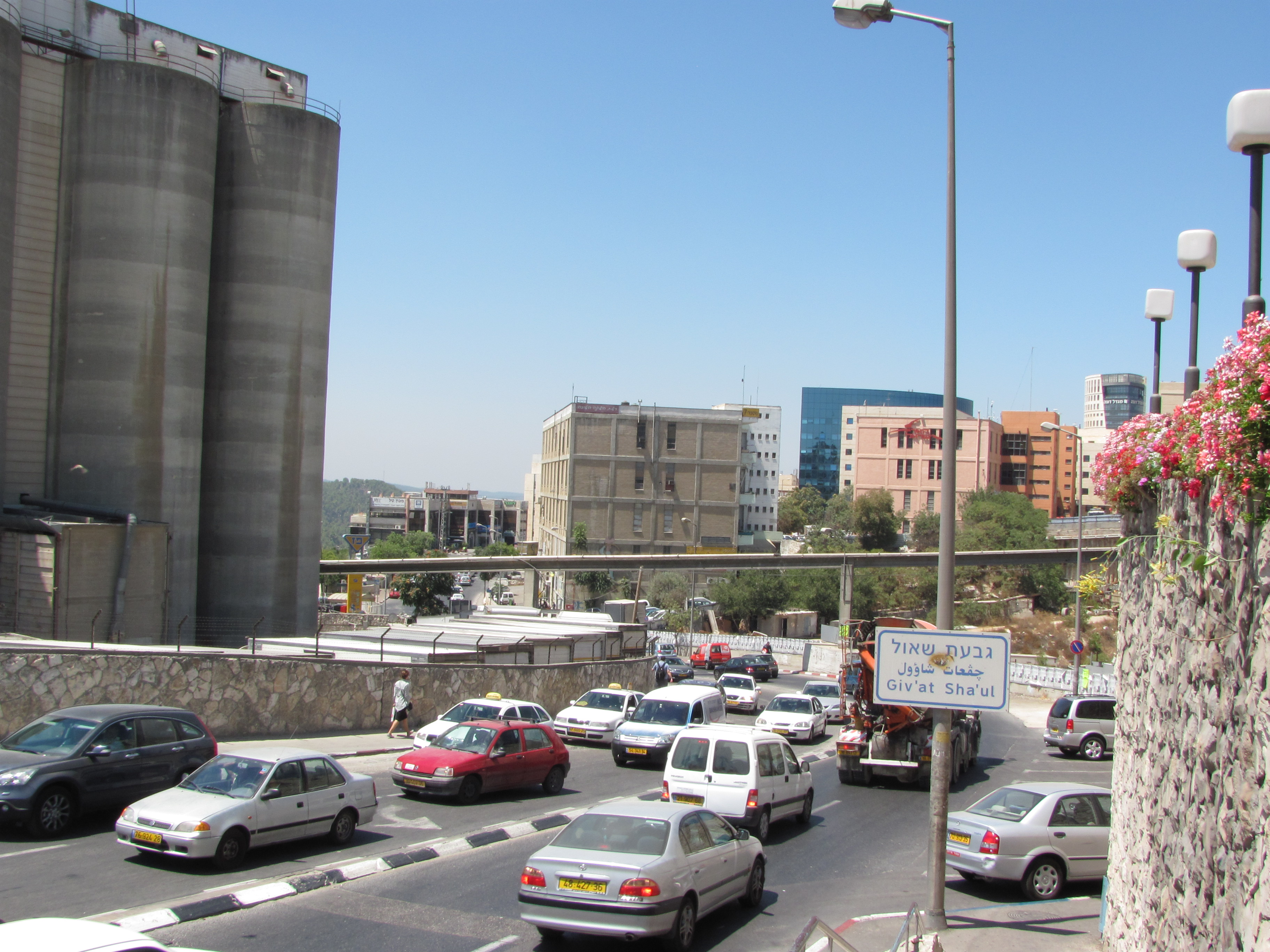
View of the overhead flour pipeline spanning Beit Hadfus Street between the mill and silos (left) and the bakery (right).

In the 1950s Salomon's three sons, Avraham, Ovadia and Danny, assumed managerial positions; they became co-CEOs after Salomon's death in 1966. In 1958 Angel's Bakery moved to its present location in the Givat Shaul industrial zone at the corner of Beit Hadfus and Farbstein Streets. The site was chosen because it stood across the street from a flour mill. The Angel brothers built Israel's first flour silo and commissioned a Texas company to construct a 750-foot pipeline to convey flour directly from the mill to the silo to the bakery. Today this pipeline brings 120 tons of flour to the bakery daily. The invention, initially opposed by the Jerusalem municipality for being above-ground, won the Kaplan Prize for distinction in productivity and efficiency.

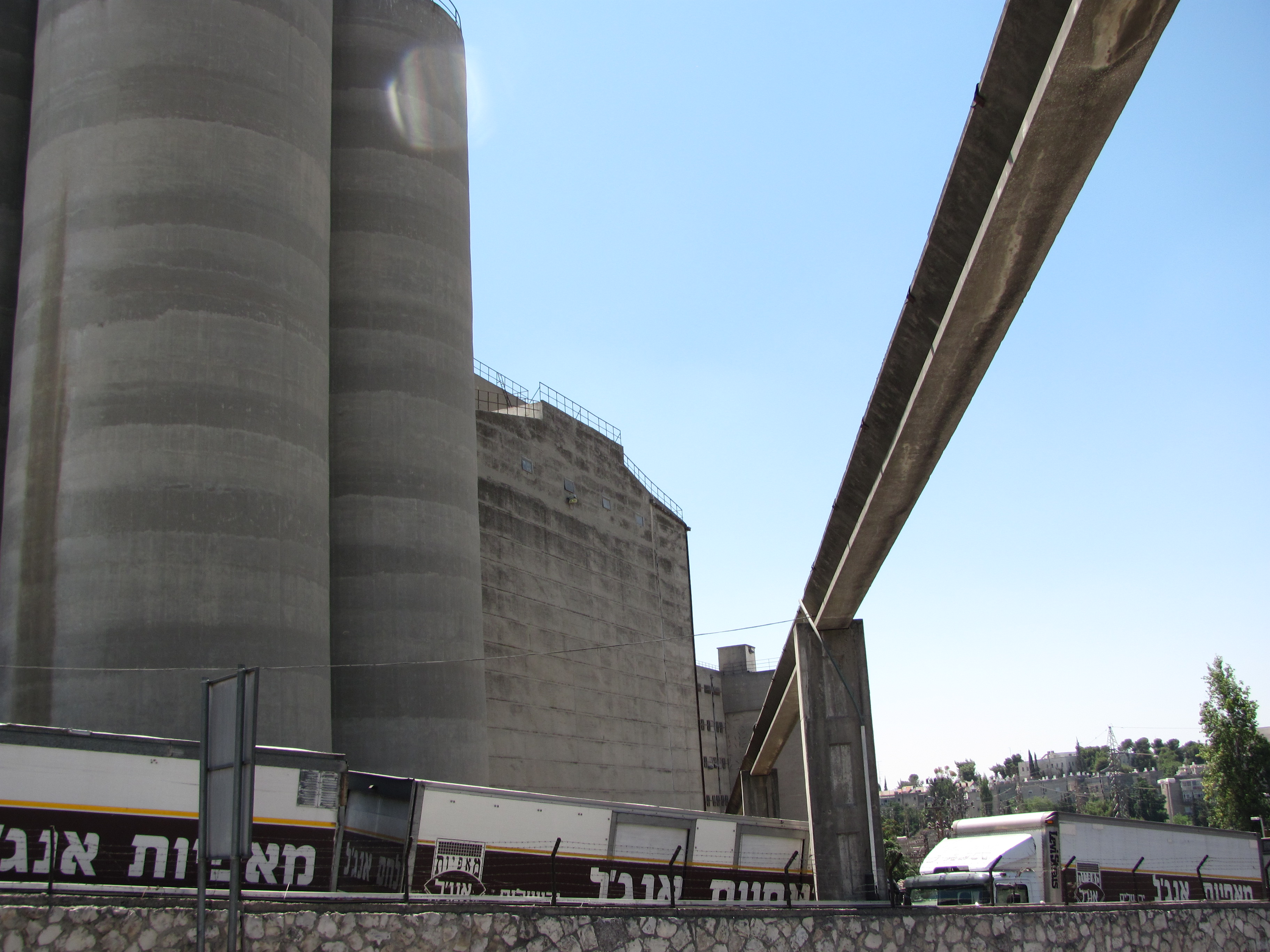
Overhead view of flour pipeline, with silos at left and Angel Bakeries trucks parked below.

Also in 1965, the brothers introduced new long ovens and kneading machines. That same year, they produced the country's first sliced bread and bread containing soy flour.

To enter the whole wheat bread market, the bakery imported its own wheat-cleaning machine from Hungary; the machine actually had to be smuggled out since Hungary did not have diplomatic relations with Israel at the time. However, health-food consumers were wary of the first whole-wheat loaves because they were white, not brown. Working with the Health Food Association, Angel's came up with the solution of adding all-natural molasses to the bread to give it a brown color.

Angel's developed the only production line in Israel with the capacity to produce 3,300 loaves of bread per hour. Thirteen other bread production lines in its various plants each yield over 2,000 loaves per hour. One production line in Jerusalem has the capacity to turn out 10,000 pitas in three hours. On each day of the eight-day Hanukkah festival, the Jerusalem plant also fries up 250,000 sufganiyot, the jelly-filled doughnut favored by Israelis at this season.

The bakery's digitally controlled ovens continually adjust temperatures to accommodate the fermenting and baking processes; these ovens can also bake different types of bread at different temperatures on the top and bottom of each oven. Despite the emphasis on innovation and automation, Angel's challot are still braided by hand.

=== Expansion and diversification ===
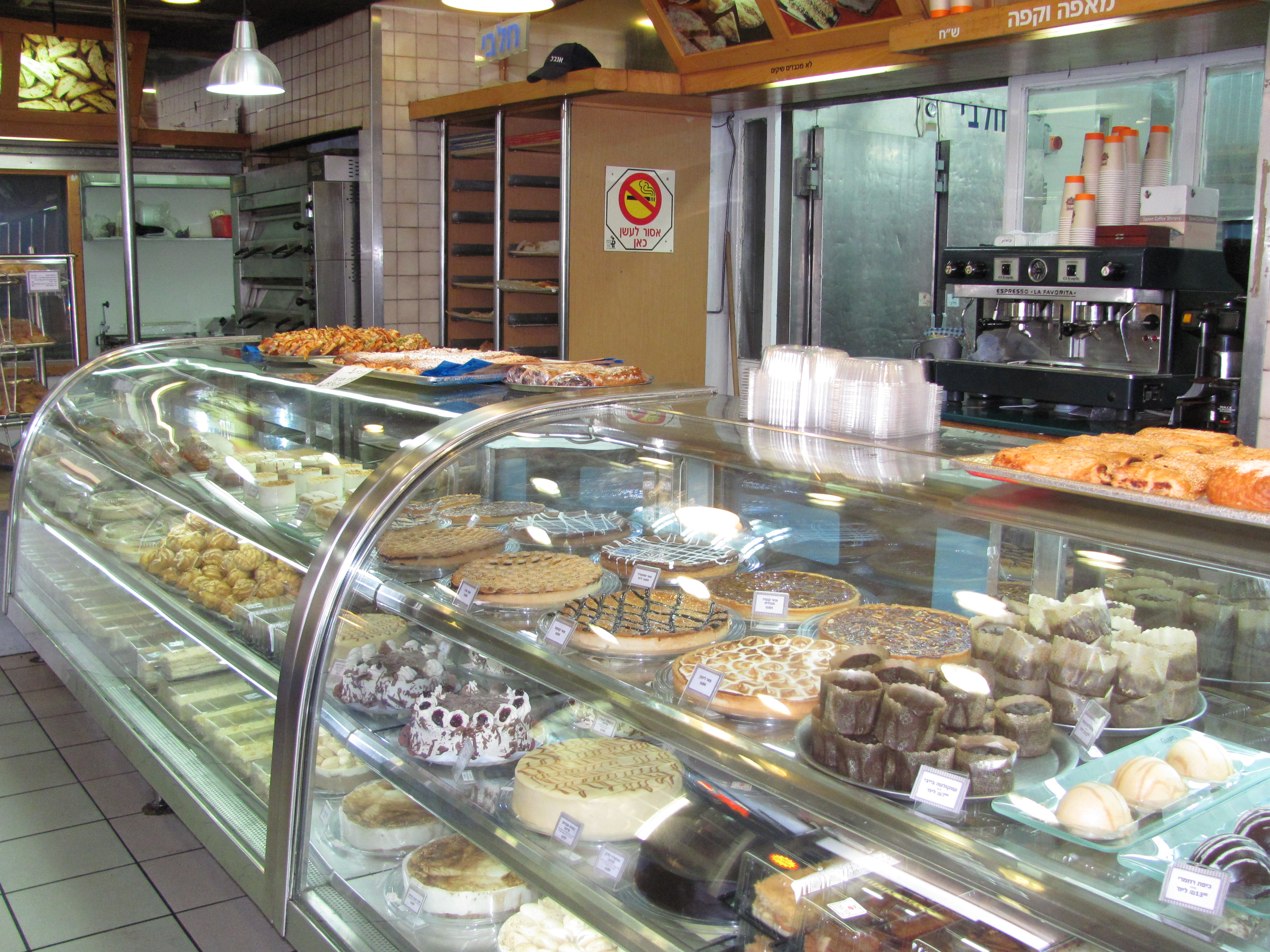
Interior of factory store in Givat Shaul.

Angel's Bakery opened its landmark factory store adjacent to the Givat Shaul plant in 1984. The store offers a full selection of packaged breads, rolls, and muffins, bourekas, danishes, fancy cakes, handmade pastries, coffee and soft drinks. For many years, visitors could watch bakers braid challot through a large side window. At the end of the Passover holiday, a long line of customers traditionally forms outside the store after midnight, waiting to buy the first bread off the production line.

Also in 1984, the company began producing pastries and cakes in a factory in Jerusalem, and beginning in the 1990s it began building and acquiring other bakeries in a move to diversify its products and marketing base. It built a new bakery in Lod in 1995 and purchased the Tuv Tam bakery in Netivot in 1999. Today the company owns and operates five plants:

- Jerusalem – serving Jerusalem and its environs
- Kfar HaHoresh (Oranim Bakery) – serving Northern Israel
- Lod – serving Central Israel and the Gush Dan region
- Netivot – serving Southern Israel
- Beit Shemesh – dedicated factory for cakes and pastries distributed nationwide

The company has branched into the baking of breads with special grains and added dietary fibers, reduced-calorie and vitamin-fortified breads, and certified organic products.

In 2002, it introduced parbaked pita, challah, rolls, ciabatta, "artisan" breads, and pizza bases, which are flash frozen and sold to customers or stores that complete the baking process themselves for a fresher product.

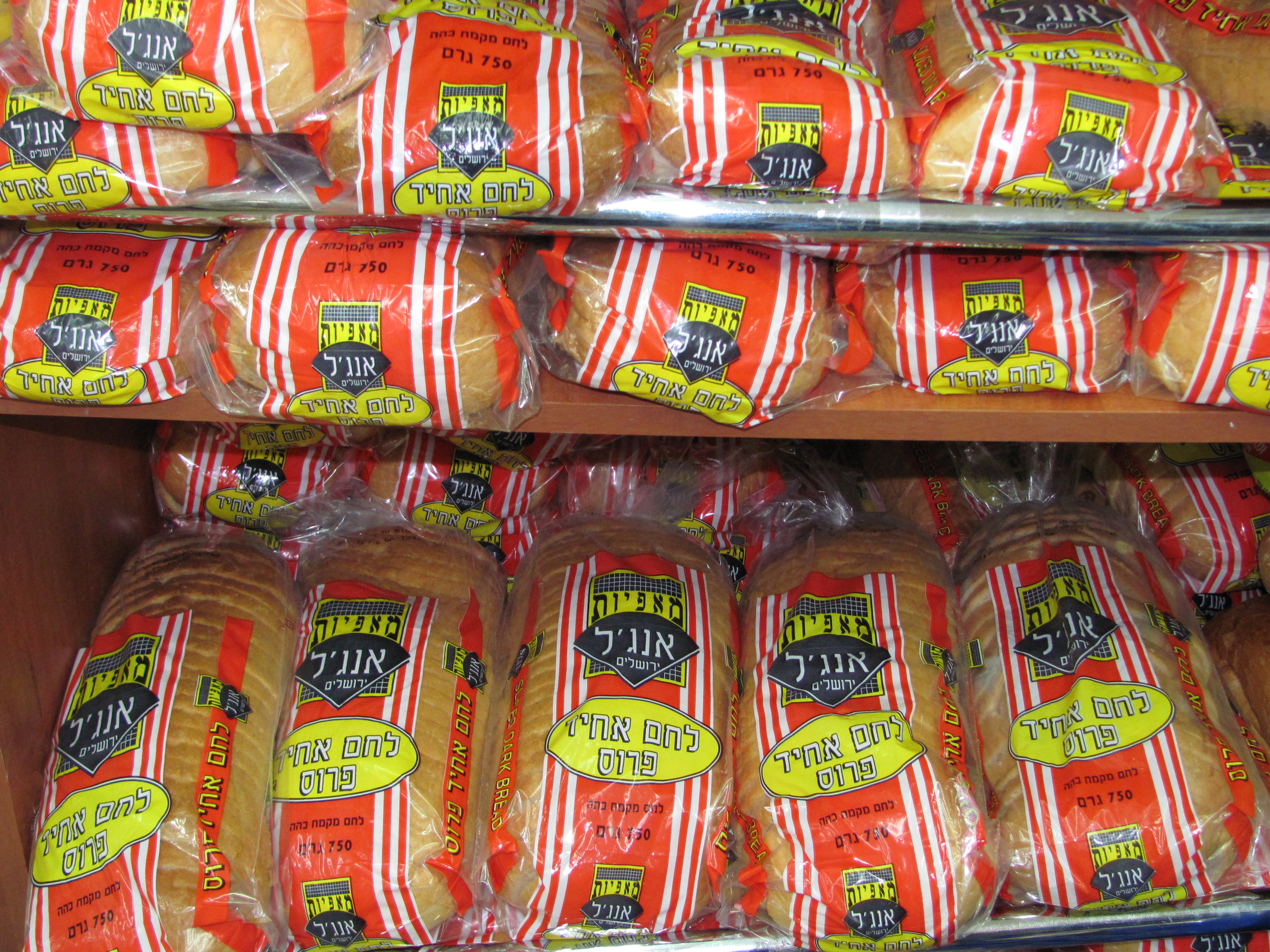
Bags of sliced, "dark white" Angel lechem achid (price-controlled bread) for sale in a Jerusalem grocery.

In keeping with government regulations, Angel Bakeries also produces several varieties of price-controlled bread (Hebrew: לחם אחיד, lechem achid) for the low-income sector.

In the late 1990s, the company opened a chain of cafe/bakeshops in four Jerusalem shopping districts. Besides selling the company's bakery-fresh goods, the Angel Cafe serves salads, sandwiches, pasta dishes, desserts, coffees, teas, and soft drinks.

=== Distribution ===
Angel Bakeries owns a fleet of 200 trucks that transport its products to 32 company-owned outlets, 6,000 stores, and hundreds of hotels and army bases throughout Israel. The distribution schedule is fully computerized and designed to operate on a "just in time" basis: All the bread that needs to be delivered to a specific location is programmed to come off the production line right before it is loaded onto a truck and sent off, guaranteeing maximum freshness.

Angel Bakeries is an approved supplier to the Domino's Pizza chain in Israel, and the sole supplier of hamburger buns to McDonald's restaurants in Israel. It also exports to the United States, United Kingdom, France, Belgium and Denmark. In terms of input, the company uses over 5,000 tons of flour per month.

== Compliance with Jewish law ==
In the interests of keeping the bread kosher (Angel Bakeries carries the hechsher of both the Edah HaChareidis and the Orthodox Union), Angel's son Ovadia, a trained chemist, collaborated with others at the Angel's-owned Adumim Chemicals plant to develop a new formula for the emulsifiers that bind water and oil in the bread-making process. In those early days, emulsifiers were made with animal-based fats which were not kosher. Ovadia Angel and his team produced emulsifiers from hydrogenated fats, a vegetable-based source, and later sold this new knowledge to other companies.

Another kashrut challenge which the bakery overcame in the early 1950s concerned the ability to produce fresh bread for sale on Sunday mornings after the plant had been closed for Shabbat in accordance with Jewish law. Normally dough takes four to six hours to rise, but the bakery acquired a mixer made by Tweedy of Burnley, England, which could produce dough in only two hours, thus allowing the bakery to bake bread on Saturday night in time for Sunday-morning deliveries. Today Angel Bakeries owns nine such mixers, five of which are used in its Jerusalem plant.

Angel Bakeries operates year-round except for Shabbat, Yom Tov, and Passover week. In accordance with Jewish law, it annually sells its stock to a non-Jew before Passover so that it does not own chametz over the holiday.

== Criticism ==
=== Involvement in Israeli settlements ===
On 12 February 2020, the United Nations published a database of companies doing business related in the West Bank, including East Jerusalem, as well as in the occupied Golan Heights. Angel Bakeries was listed on the database on account of its activities in Israeli settlements in these occupied territories, which are considered illegal under international law, according to the United Nations.

== Family business ==
Angel's was the first Israeli bakery to go public on the Tel Aviv Stock Exchange, in 1984. However, it remains a family business. In the 1980s Salomon's grandchildren moved into managerial positions. Avraham, the eldest brother, who headed the financial division, was succeeded by his daughter Ruthie. Ovadia passed down the directorship of production and technology to his son Gadi. Danny handed over the company directorship to his son Yaron.

Angel Bakeries employs 1,800 workers, including Israelis, Palestinians, and new immigrants. Some of its workers are third-generation employees. In its over 80-year history, the bakery has never had a strike.

== Retail brands ==
- Angel Bakeries (Hebrew: מאפיית אנג'ל Ma'afiyat Angel) – white, "dark white" and whole-wheat sliced bread, whole-wheat and multi-grain breads, challot, pita bread, light/sugar-free breads, rolls, buns
- Lechem Eynan (Hebrew: לחם עינן) – pre-germinated whole-wheat bread
- French-style bread (Hebrew: לחם אנג'ל בסגנון צרפתי) – handmade bread using traditional French baking methods
- Lachmaniyot (Hebrew: לחמניות) – bestselling children's buns with free plastic sandwich bags in each package
- Wheat crisps (Hebrew: קליליות) – 19-calorie crackers

== Honors and awards ==
The intersection of Kanfei Nesharim and Farbstein Streets, on the northeastern corner of the bakery, was named Shlomo Angel Square by the Jerusalem municipality in honor of the company's founder.

Danny Angel (1920–2009), who worked in the family business from the age of 7 until his death at age 89 was the public face of the company. He was the recipient of many awards, including the Jerusalem Prize, Worthy Citizen of Jerusalem, and Notable Industrialist. He was president of the Manufacturers Association of Israel, the Rotary Club of Israel, and the Variety Club of Israel, which he helped found. He had many friends in the political echelon as well. In recognition of their longtime friendship, Jerusalem mayor Teddy Kollek always gave Danny Angel an honorary spot at the bottom of his electoral list. In 2008, mayoral candidate Nir Barkat continued the tradition and placed Angel's name at the bottom of his electoral list. Angel's funeral was attended by Prime Minister Ehud Olmert, Likud party leader Benjamin Netanyahu, and other government officials.

== Angel's Bakery, Brooklyn ==
Joe Angel, a great-great-grandson of Salomon Angel who, like his cousins, helped out at the family bakery in Jerusalem, moved to the United States in 1969 and earned a degree in bakery management from Kansas State University. In 1981 he opened his own Angel's Bakery in Brooklyn, New York, specializing in muffins, cookies and cakes.

== See also ==
- List of bakeries
