= Adventures with Rebbe Mendel =

Children's book series

Adventures With Rebbe Mendel
- Author: Nathan Sternfeld
- Language: Hebrew, English
- Genre: children's fiction, Jewish
- Publisher: Feldheim Publishers
- Publication date: 2002–2009
- Publication place: United States

Adventures With Rebbe Mendel is a series of children's books written by Nathan Sternfeld and published by Feldheim Publishers. The books belong to the Jewish children's fiction genre. The books were originally written in Hebrew. The English translations were done by Riva Pomerantz.

== Books in the series ==
1. Adventures With Rebbe Mendel (2002) – a collection of 32 short stories
2. All About Motti and His Adventures With Rebbe Mendel (2004) – a book of excerpts from the diary of an imaginative French child named Charles Mordechai Williamson.
3. The Secret of the Red Pearl (2005)
4. A Home on the Hill (2006)
5. Rebbe Mendel ... in a Class by Himself (2009) – a collection of 17 short stories
6. Rebbe Mendel ... Snow Joke (2018)

== See also ==
- Children's literature
