= Kanfei Nesharim Street =

Road in Jerusalem

Coordinates: 31.7876°N 35.1895°E

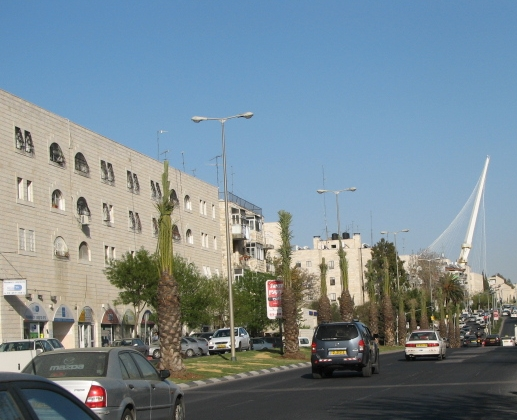
Kanfei Nesharim Street, looking east toward the Jerusalem Chords Bridge.

Kanfei Nesharim Street (Hebrew: רחוב כנפי נשרים, lit. 'Wings of Eagles Street') is a major east–west thoroughfare in the Givat Shaul neighborhood of western Jerusalem. Unlike most Jerusalem streets, Kanfei Nesharim is a wide thoroughfare with two traffic lanes in each direction, separated by a median, and spans 3 kilometres (1.9 mi) in a straight line. It connects the neighborhood of Kiryat Moshe on the east to Har Nof on the west, and includes the modern commercial strip of office buildings, stores and restaurants in what is termed Givat Shaul Bet.

== Name ==
The street was named after the operation to airlift the entire community of more than 40,000 Yemenite Jews to Israel in 1949–1950. Officially code-named "Wings of Eagles" (though colloquially referred to as "Operation Magic Carpet"), this operation was named after the Biblical description of God taking the Israelites out of Egypt and protecting them through their wanderings in the desert "on eagles' wings" (Exodus 19:4).

== History ==
The land on which Kanfei Nesharim Street lies was originally a dirt road leading out of Givat Shaul toward a cluster of Arab villages on the western perimeter of Jerusalem. During the Battle for Jerusalem in 1948, when convoys were often attacked on the Tel Aviv–Jerusalem highway, the back roads from Tel Aviv – like the one leading to Givat Shaul – became crucially important. In late 1946, the Haganah straightened and paved the road in order to use it as a landing strip. At the height of the siege, the Haganah flew in supplies, armaments, food and soldiers on this runway.

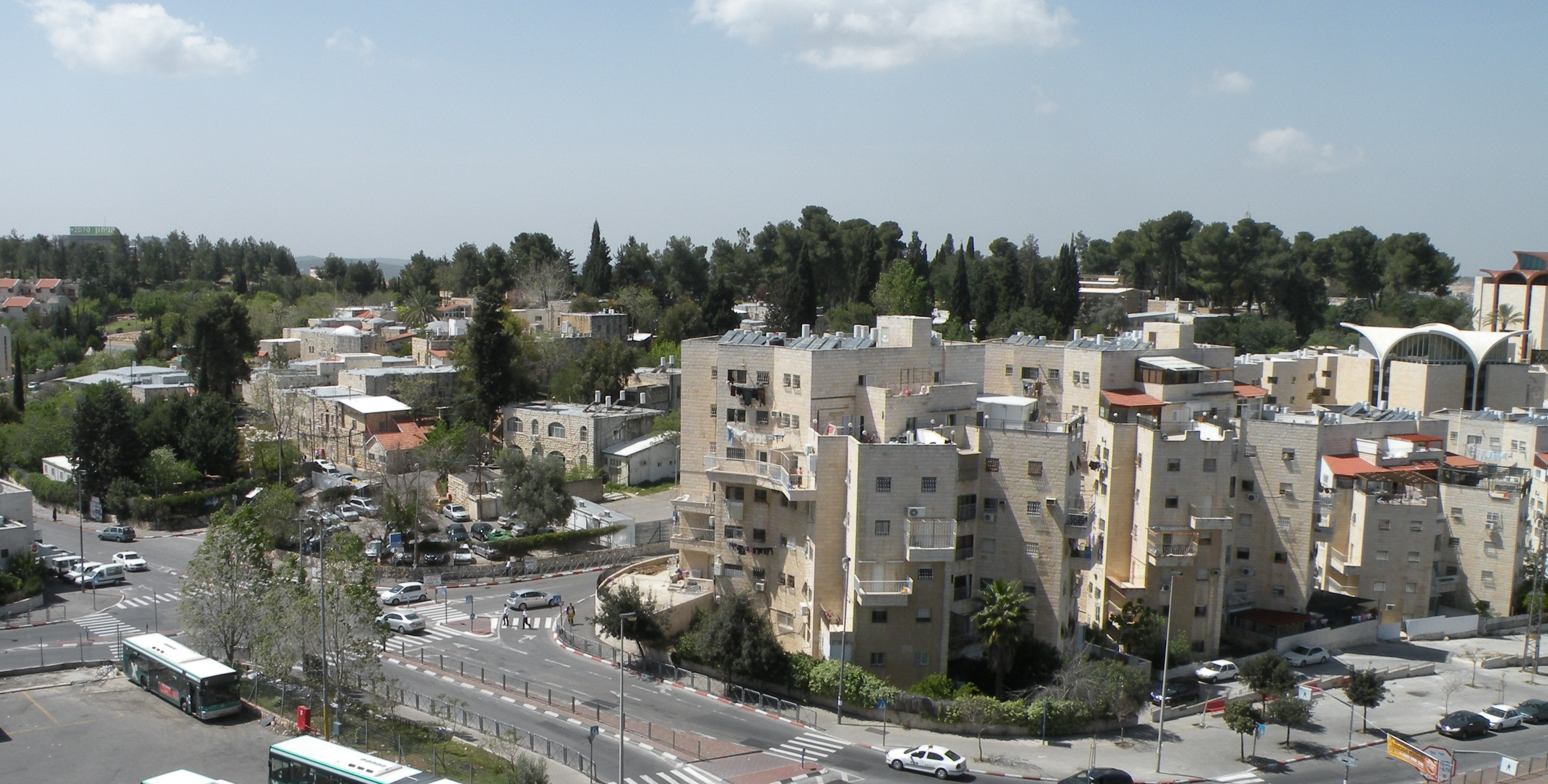
The Kfar Shaul Mental Health Center (left) occupies the remaining buildings of the village of Deir Yassin.

On 3 April 1948, the Haganah launched Operation Nachshon to capture the high ground on both sides of the Tel Aviv-Jerusalem highway. On 9 April it fought to regain Castel (at Latrun); simultaneously, the Irgun and Lehi forces attacked the Deir Yassin village at the western end of Kanfei Nesharim Street. Many of the inhabitants were killed in the attack, now known as the Deir Yassin massacre. The Israelis expelled the surviving residents and repopulated the area with Orthodox Jewish immigrants from Poland, Romania, and Slovakia; the center of the village was renamed Givat Shaul Bet. Today, the remaining buildings of Deir Yassin are part of the Kfar Shaul Mental Health Center at the border between Givat Shaul Bet and Har Nof.

== Commercial development ==
A spate of building in the 1980s and 1990s brought stylish office buildings, chain stores and restaurants to what until then had been a sparsely populated street. In contrast, Beit Hadfus Street, running roughly parallel and to the south, remained largely industrial with discount supermarkets and outlet stores that attract bargain shoppers.

The development of Kanfei Nesharim Street also aided the Haredi Jewish residents of Har Nof from a halakhic standpoint: With a contiguous stretch of buildings leading from Har Nof to the Old City, Har Nof could now be halakhically considered "part" of Jerusalem and could observe Shushan Purim on 15 Adar as opposed to Purim on 14 Adar.

=== Government offices ===
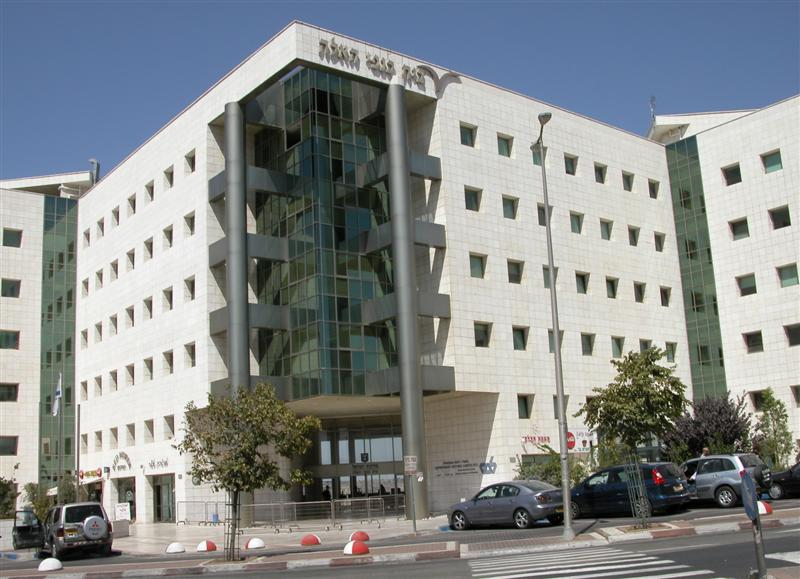
The Israel Central Bureau of Statistics building on Kanfei Nesharim Street.

Kanfei Nesharim Street is home to these government offices:

- Directorate of Judicial Courts
- Income Tax Commission
- Israel Anti-Drug Authority
- Israel Ministry of Environmental Protection
- Israel Securities Authority
- Israel Central Bureau of Statistics
- National Authority of Religious Services
