= Beit Hadfus Street =

Street in Jerusalem, Israel

Beit Hadfus Street (Hebrew: רחוב בית הדפוס, Rehov Beit Hadfus, lit. "Street of the Printing Press"), also spelled Beit Hadefus, is an east–west street in the Givat Shaul industrial zone in western Jerusalem.

== Name ==
Beit Hadfus Street was constructed in the 1960s and named for the printing houses that established themselves there.

Two of Israel's largest book publishing houses which still maintain their headquarters on the street are Keter Publishing House, established in 1958, and Feldheim Publishers, which established its Israel branch in the 1960s. Laser Pages Publishing Ltd., located in the Mercaz Sapir complex, publishes scientific journals. Printing establishments include Old City Press, founded in 1969, and Yaakov Feldheim Ltd. A string of printing shops is located at the western end of the street.

== Bargain stores ==
In contrast to Kanfei Nesharim Street, the other main commercial artery in Givat Shaul, which developed into a modern shopping area with many chain stores, restaurants, and stylish office buildings, Beit Hadfus Street has remained largely industrial with discount and outlet stores that attract bargain shoppers. The neighbourhood has also witnessed a spate of pricing wars among supermarkets geared to Haredi shoppers, notably Rami Levy (located on Kanfei Nesharim Street) and Osher Ad (located on Beit Hadfus) discount supermarkets.

=== Low-cost wedding halls ===
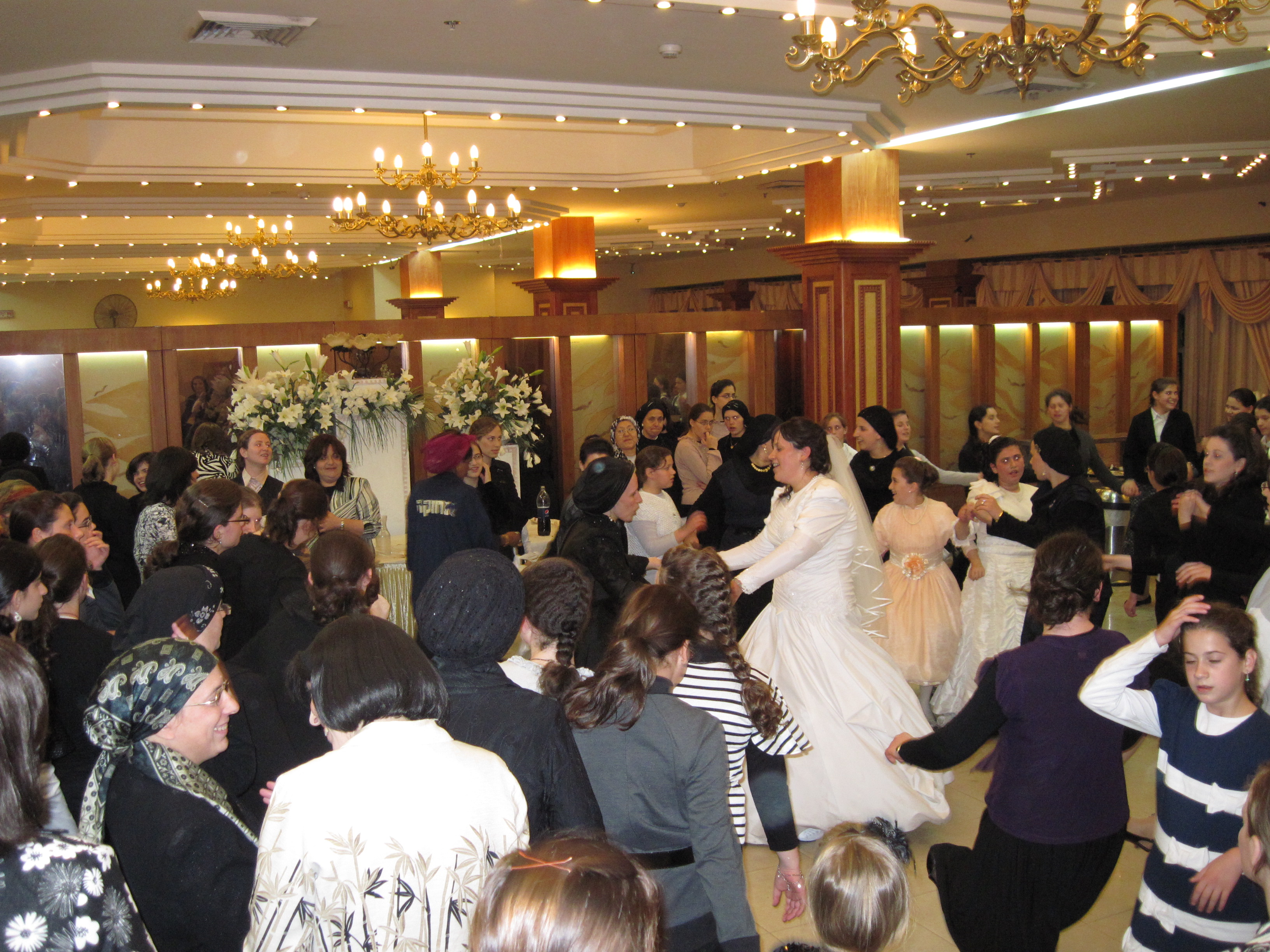
Haredi wedding at Armonot Wolf.

Low-cost wedding halls servicing the religious population of Jerusalem have also opened in office and industrial buildings on the street. Some of these are subsidized by major charity organizations to keep expenses down for low-income families. The Armonot Wolf (Wolf Palaces) wedding halls are affiliated with the Yad Eliezer charity organization, which subsidizes weddings for needy couples through its Adopt-a-Wedding campaign. The Gutnick halls, funded by Australian philanthropist Joseph Gutnick and managed by Chabad, provide subsidized weddings for 440 needy couples annually through the Colel Chabad charity fund. The Lechaim halls, located in the same industrial complex as Armonot Wolf (Wolf Palaces), are also cheaper than wedding halls in other parts of the city.

== Bakeries ==
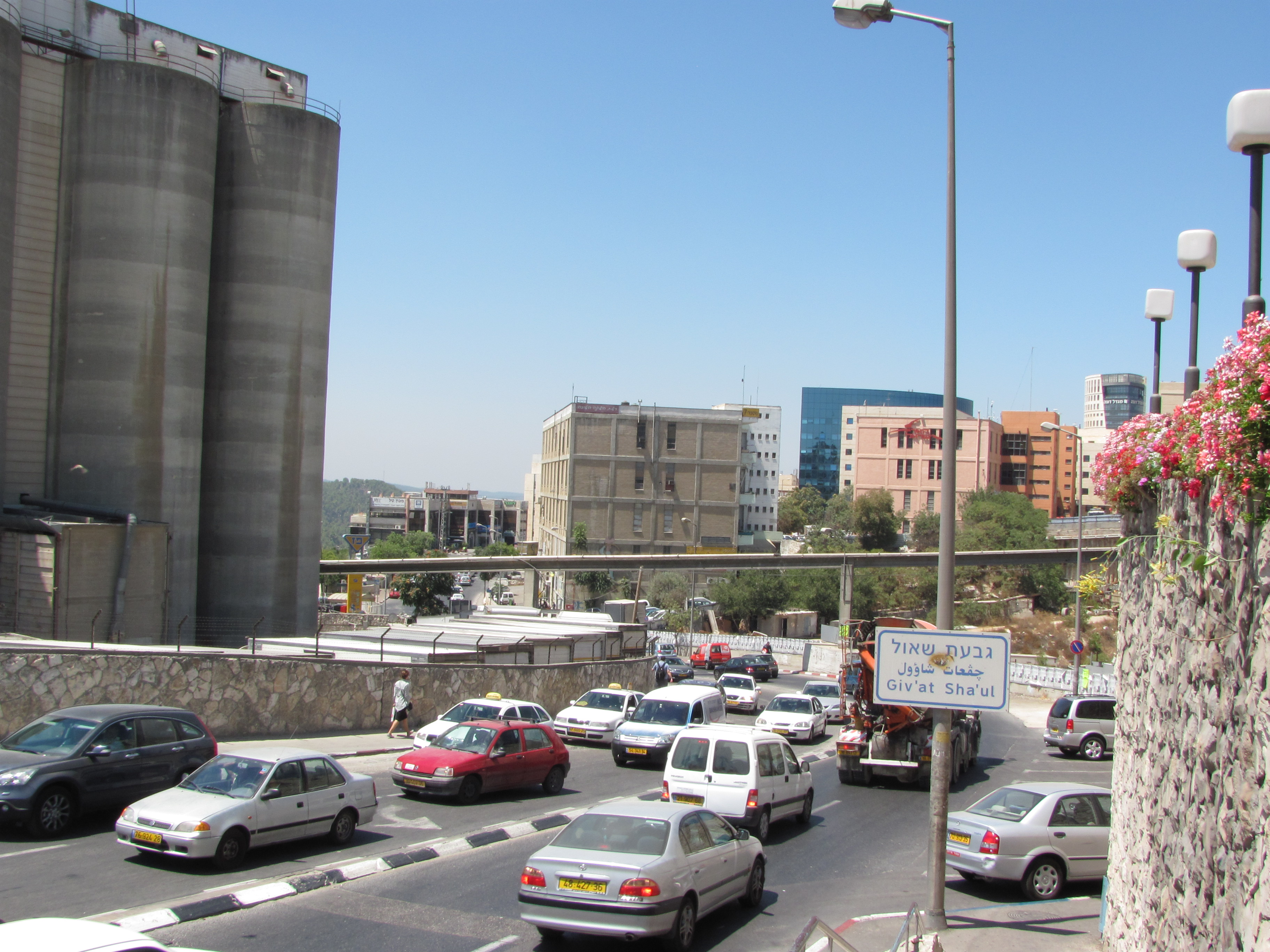
View of Angel Bakeries' flour pipeline spanning Beit Hadfus Street between the flour silo (left) and bakery (right).

Israel's two largest commercial bakeries are located on Beit Hadfus Street: Angel Bakeries, founded in 1958 opposite a flour mill, and Berman's Bakery, established in 1965 further east. In 1965, Angel Bakeries commissioned a Texas company to construct a 750-foot (230 m) pipeline to convey flour directly from the flour mill to the silo to the bakery across the street. Today this pipeline brings 120 tons of flour to the bakery daily. The invention, initially opposed by the Jerusalem municipality for being above-ground, won the Kaplan Prize for distinction in productivity and efficiency.

== Government and education ==
Beit Hadfus Street is also home to:

- Israel's State Comptroller and Ombudsman
- Tal Institute, the women's division of the Jerusalem College of Technology
- Touro College in Israel Library
- Yanar College
