= Yad Eliezer =

Jewish poverty-relief organization

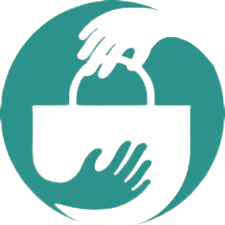
- Formation: 1980
- Legal status: Non-profit
- Purpose: Poverty relief
- Headquarters: 12 Polanski St. Jerusalem, Israel 95271
- Location: Israel
- Region served: Israel
- Official language: Hebrew
- Director: Dov Weisel
- Budget: $24 million (2010)
- Volunteers: 12,000
- Website: yadeliezer.org.il

Yad Eliezer (Hebrew: אגודת יד אליעזר, "Yad Eliezer Association") is a Jewish poverty-relief organization in Israel. It is best known for its monthly distribution of thousands of family food packages, baby formula and baby food packages. It also provides a range of financial and rehabilitative support services, including the mentoring of boys from single-parent families and free or low-cost weddings at its wedding complex in Givat Shaul, Jerusalem. Founded as a small, neighborhood chesed organization, it is now one of the largest poverty-relief organizations in Israel, with over 12,000 volunteers. Led by Orthodox Jewish management, it provides services for both religious and secular families in Israel.

== History ==
Yad Eliezer was founded in 1980 by Rabbi Yaakov and Hadassah Weisel, both elementary schoolteachers, and named in memory of her father, Rabbi Eliezer Lipa Benzman. The seeds of the organization were planted when Hadassah, a resident of Jerusalem's Kiryat Sanz neighborhood, found out that her neighbor's family was suffering from malnutrition, and sent her daughters door to door to collect food for them every week. As word got around, other families requested the same assistance, and she was soon sending all her daughters' classmates out to collect food, then filling colorful plastic shopping baskets for the weekly delivery. Other classes and other schools got involved, and Weisel's two-and-a-half room apartment became the collection point and packing area for monthly food boxes for 360 needy families – a figure that mushroomed to 1,800 needy families by 1995. After operating Yad Eliezer out of her apartment for 20 years, Weisel began soliciting overseas donations through the American Friends of Yad Eliezer to further expand the operation. Yad Eliezer is now headquartered in the Shmuel HaNavi neighborhood of Jerusalem under the directorship of the Weisels' son, Dov.

== Food collection and distribution ==
Yad Eliezer provides monthly food packages, comprising basic necessities such as "eggs, oil, flour, sugar, and canned goods" and fresh produce to 6,000 families throughout Israel. It also distributes hundreds of Shabbat food packages consisting of "challah, fish, salads, chicken, and cake" to needy families and poor elderly, and holiday food packages in advance of Passover and Rosh Hashana. In response to government welfare budget cuts, Yad Eliezer distributed 9,000 Passover food packages in 2004, up 5,000 from the previous year.

Approximately 50 percent of the food distributed by Yad Eliezer is purchased wholesale with donations from overseas donors. Thirty-five percent of the food is gathered from Israeli farmers' surplus, amounting to $3 million worth of fruits and vegetables annually. Yad Eliezer also receives produce through the maaser ani (Hebrew: מעשר עני, lit. "poor tithe"), the 10-percent tithe of Israeli farm produce separated by Orthodox farmers in the third and sixth year of the sabbatical year agricultural cycle for the benefit of poor people. The remaining 15 percent of food is obtained through door-to-door collections of non-perishable food by girls in primarily religious neighborhoods. These girls volunteer under the supervision of local coordinators, who send the donated food items to Yad Eliezer's warehouse. Regular and drop-in volunteers – including students, soldiers, and visitors from abroad – help in the warehouse, sorting food by category and boxing the monthly distribution.

== Baby food ==
Yad Eliezer provides baby food packages to 2,000 infants monthly. This includes monthly supplies of Materna baby formula for 1,400 infants.

== Weddings ==
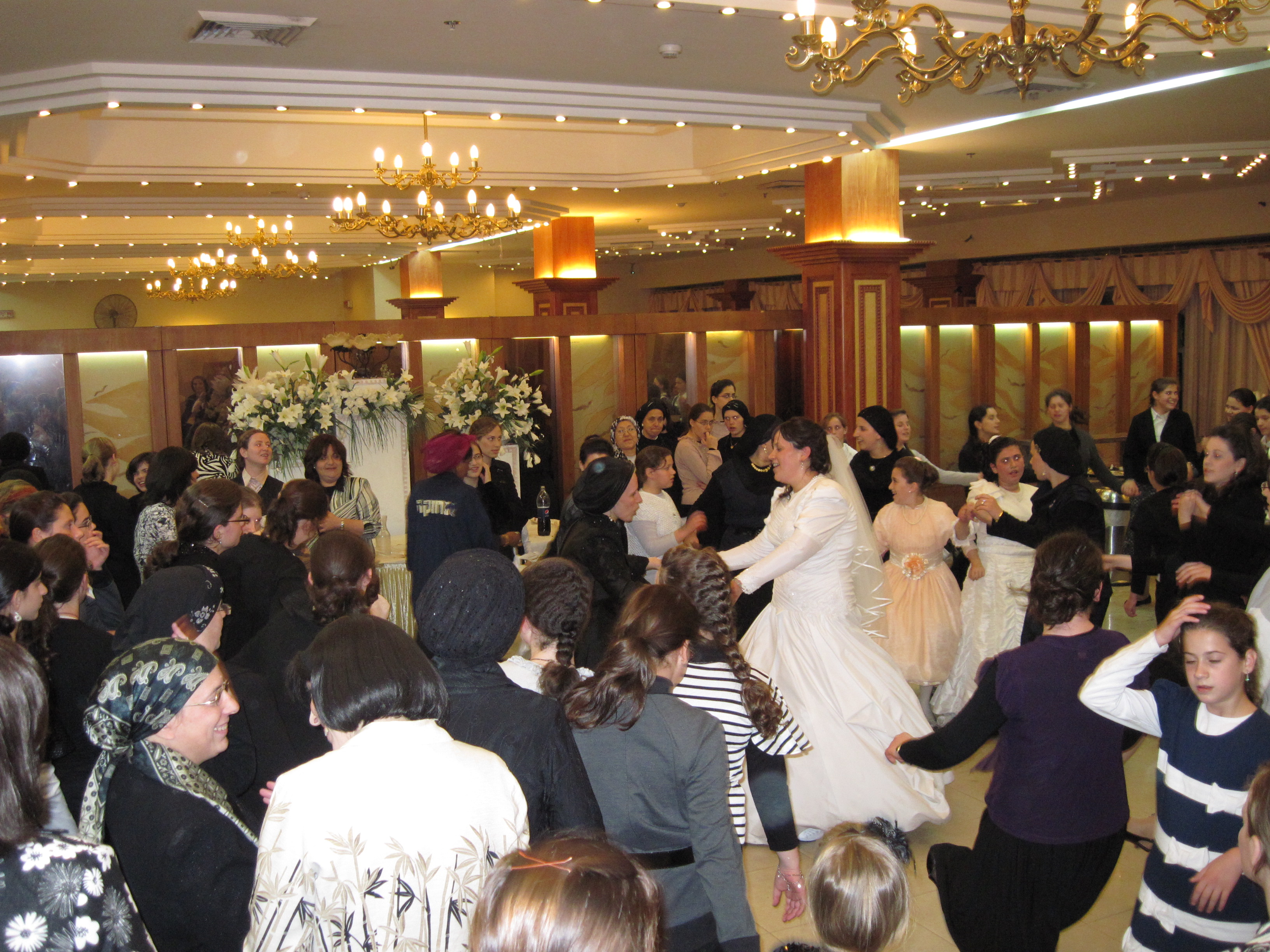
A Haredi wedding at the Armonot Wolf wedding halls.

Shortly after Weisel began collecting food for poor families, she heard about a bride who could not afford to make her own wedding. Weisel and her daughters offered to do the cooking and set up the wedding in a local synagogue. This operation expanded into catering three or four weddings per week and the hiring of impoverished waiters and waitresses who were invited to take home the leftover food. In 2000, Yad Eliezer acquired an industrial kitchen and began promoting the idea of "dancing at two weddings" to Americans who were marrying off their own children: for a donation of $1,000 they could sponsor a needy couple's wedding the same night in Israel. In 2005 Yad Eliezer purchased the Armonot Wolf wedding complex on Beit Hadfus Street in Givat Shaul, Jerusalem for $4 million. The complex's two wedding halls host both weddings for needy couples and discounted weddings for religious families from the general Orthodox community in Jerusalem. Yad Eliezer volunteers also cater discounted meals for four other Jerusalem wedding halls. The organization pays all or part of the expenses for 400 weddings for needy couples annually.

== Mentoring program ==
Yad Eliezer's mentoring program for boys from single-parent homes began in 2000 with 400 boys. As of 2013, 4,000 boys are enrolled in the program. Pairing up mentors with orphans, children of divorced parents, and children who have a seriously ill parent or sibling, the program operates in 35 cities.

== Other services ==
Yad Eliezer also operates an orphans fund, an emergency grants fund, distribution centers for second-hand furniture and appliances, a visitation program for families coping with illness, a shoe distribution program, and a job-training program.
