= Kfar Shaul Mental Health Center =

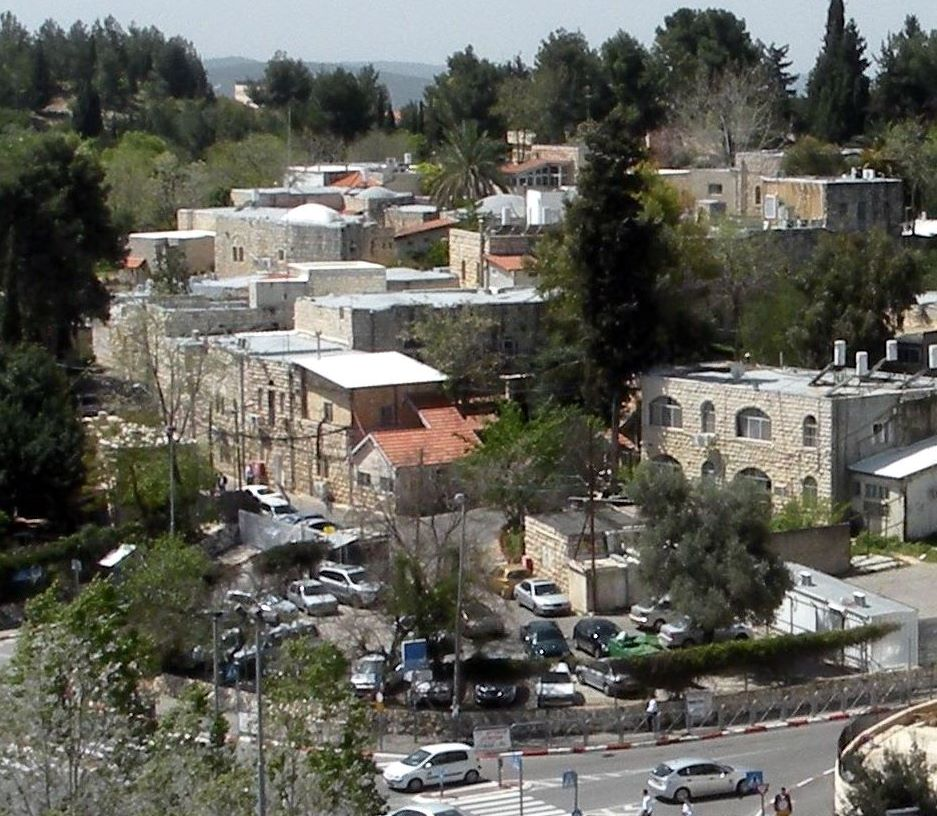

Geography
- Location: Jerusalem
- Coordinates: 31°47′11.31″N 35°10′40.92″E

Organisation
- Type: Specialist

Services
- Speciality: Psychiatric

History
- Founded: 1951

Kfar Shaul Mental Health Center (Hebrew: בית החולים כפר שאול), established in 1951, is an Israeli public psychiatric hospital located between Givat Shaul and Har Nof, Jerusalem. It is affiliated with the Hadassah Medical Center and the Hebrew University of Jerusalem. The hospital is Jerusalem's designated psychiatric hospital for tourists who display mental health disturbances, and is widely known for its research on Jerusalem Syndrome.

The center is part of the wider Jerusalem Mental Health Center system, which also includes Eitanim Hospital and community psychiatric clinics serving Jerusalem and nearby municipalities. In addition to inpatient psychiatric care, Kfar Shaul has been associated with psychiatric epidemiology, transcultural psychiatry, travel-related psychosis, and neurophysiological research.

The hospital is located on the grounds of the former Palestinian village of Deir Yassin, and makes use of buildings that remained intact after the massacre of Deir Yassin that occurred during the 1948 Palestine War.

== History and institutional development ==
Kfar Shaul was originally known as the Kfar Shaul Government Work Village for Mental Patients, reflecting its early emphasis on occupational and outdoor work as part of psychiatric rehabilitation. The National Library of Israel catalogue lists a 1964 Hebrew publication connected to an explanatory exhibition at Kfar Shaul, held during a visit by members of the World Federation of Occupational Therapists, indicating the institution's early association with occupational therapy and rehabilitation.

In 2006, the separate friends associations of Eitanim and Kfar Shaul were merged to create the Association of Friends of the Jerusalem Mental Health Center. The Jerusalem Mental Health Center has been described as including the Kfar Shaul and Eitanim hospital campuses, community clinics, and a national department for autistic adults.

== Campus and services ==
The Kfar Shaul campus has operated as a psychiatric hospital since 1951. According to the Jerusalem Mental Health Center, the campus includes inpatient wards, day hospitalization and outpatient clinics, and extends over 56 dunams with both historic and newer buildings. The campus includes a psychiatric emergency room, closed and open inpatient wards, psychogeriatric wards, an electroconvulsive therapy service, an esketamine clinic, day hospitalization, and specialist day-treatment programs.

=== Emergency and inpatient care ===
Kfar Shaul operates a psychiatric emergency room and acute inpatient wards. Ward A is described by the Jerusalem Mental Health Center as a closed acute ward for men, treating patients admitted voluntarily as well as patients hospitalized by court order, observation order or involuntary hospitalization order. The ward's multidisciplinary staff includes psychiatrists, nurses, psychologists, social workers and occupational therapists.

=== Psychogeriatric and rehabilitation care ===
Kfar Shaul includes psychogeriatric services. Ward C is described as a mixed-gender psychogeriatric ward for patients aged 40 and older with multiple recurrent hospitalizations. The center describes the ward as combining psychiatric, medical, cognitive and functional care, including medication management, occupational therapy, physiotherapy and rehabilitation planning aimed at return to community life.

=== Trauma-focused day treatment ===
The Kfar Shaul campus includes Lotus, a day-treatment unit for women coping with complex trauma related to sexual assault. The unit's 16-week program focuses on stabilization, regulation of post-traumatic symptoms, processing trauma-related consequences, and return to daily functioning. The program includes individual and group treatments, dialectical behavior therapy, expressive and creative therapies, and functional groups.

== Therapeutic approaches ==
Kfar Shaul has used a variety of rehabilitative and non-pharmacological interventions alongside psychiatric treatment. In its early decades, the hospital was organized as a work village in which many patients spent much of the day in outdoor work and occupational activity. Later services included Snoezelen rooms for controlled multisensory stimulation, art programs involving current and former patients, and day-treatment programs using group and expressive therapies.

A study from a closed psychiatric ward at Kfar Shaul examined a patient-centered intervention using relaxing music chosen by patients. The study reported use of individually selected music in a seclusion-room context as a non-verbal intervention intended to reduce stress and psychomotor agitation.

=== Mental health services research ===
The Falk Institute for Mental Health Studies, located at Kfar Shaul, has been associated with psychiatric epidemiology, mental health services research and studies of community rehabilitation in Israel. Researchers affiliated with the institute have published on rehabilitation services after the implementation of Israel's rehabilitation legislation, detection of mental disorders in primary care, and recovery-oriented interventions in psychiatric hospitals.

=== Cultural and population psychiatry ===
Kfar Shaul-affiliated researchers have also studied psychiatric care in culturally diverse populations in Israel. A comparative study of Arab and Jewish patients admitted to Jerusalem Mental Health Center-Kfar Shaul Hospital examined demographic features, psychiatric diagnoses and psychopathology among consecutively admitted patients. Other studies connected with the Falk Institute at Kfar Shaul have examined religiosity, childhood abuse, disordered eating and culturally sensitive psychiatric screening.

== Description ==
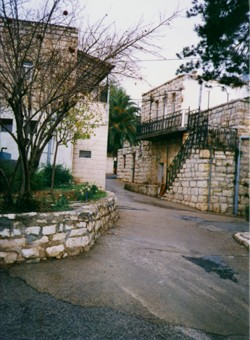
Old buildings on the hospital grounds

The Givat Shaul mental health center opened in 1951, utilizing the houses and school building of Deir Yassin, which had been left untouched. It was originally a therapeutic community of 300 patients who spent most of the day working outdoors. It was called the Kfar Shaul Government Work Village for Mental Patients. In its early years, the majority of the patients were Holocaust survivors. The hospital now suffers from severe overcrowding and has an average occupancy rate of 110 percent. Udi Aloni, an Israeli director who made a film about the hospital, Forgiveness (2006), described it as dilapidated.

The hospital is equipped with Snoezelen rooms, a Dutch therapy technique which uses controlled stimulation of the five senses to benefit the mentally and physically disabled. Kfar Shaul is known in particular for its association with Jerusalem Syndrome, a condition in which the sufferer is gripped by religious delusions. The hospital sees some 50 patients a year who are diagnosed with the condition. Israel psychologist Gregory Katz has said many of the patients are Pentecostals from rural parts of the United States and Scandinavia. The syndrome was first diagnosed in 1993 by Yair Bar-El, a former director of the hospital.

In 2022, Kfar Shaul opened an art exhibition created by current and former patients in collaboration with professional artists. The project was described as part of a broader effort to open the hospital grounds to the public and reduce the stigma associated with psychiatric hospitalization.

In 2000, archaeologists unearthed the remains of a winepress dated to the Byzantine or Roman era on the grounds of the hospital.

A Yeshivat Har Etzion memorial page for Uriel Peretz Liwerant, a former student killed during military service in 2009, notes that he volunteered at Kfar Shaul while studying at the yeshiva.

=== Research ===
Researchers affiliated with Kfar Shaul and the Jerusalem Mental Health Center have published work in psychiatric epidemiology, transcultural psychiatry, forensic psychiatry, addiction psychiatry, and neurophysiology. In addition to studies of Jerusalem Syndrome, Kfar Shaul-affiliated authors have published on compulsory ambulatory psychiatric treatment in Israel, the differential diagnosis of psychogenic and neurological amnesia in a Holocaust survivor, kleptomania, and religiously motivated genital self-mutilation in the context of Jerusalem Syndrome.

Kfar Shaul has also been associated with neurophysiological research. A 1996 study from the Dr. Jaros Jerusalem Mental Health Center, Kfar Shaul Hospital used computerized EEG spectral analysis to compare current heroin users, recent abstainers and healthy controls, with conventional EEGs also evaluated by a neurologist. A later publication from the Neurophysiology Laboratory at Kfar Shaul Mental Hospital used wavelet analysis of frontal auditory evoked potentials to study neuro-electrical events related to neurocognitive function.

== Neuroscience and neuropsychiatry research ==
Kfar Shaul has been associated with several areas of neuroscience-oriented psychiatric research, including clinical neurophysiology, cognitive neuroscience, neuropsychopharmacology, movement-disorder pharmacogenetics, and neuromodulation. Publications connected to the hospital and the wider Jerusalem Mental Health Center have examined electroencephalography (EEG), auditory evoked potentials, procedural learning in schizophrenia, genetic susceptibility to antipsychotic-induced movement disorders, and neuropsychiatric interfaces between epilepsy, anxiety and psychogenic non-epileptic seizures.

=== Clinical neurophysiology ===
A clinical neurophysiology research stream at Kfar Shaul used EEG and event-related potential methods to study psychiatric and neurocognitive phenomena. A 1996 study from the Dr. Jaros Jerusalem Mental Health Center, Kfar Shaul Hospital used computerized EEG spectral analysis to compare current heroin users, recent abstainers and healthy controls. The study analyzed taped EEG recordings using fast Fourier transform methods and included conventional EEG review by a neurologist.

In 2009, researchers from the Neurophysiology Laboratory at Kfar Shaul Mental Hospital published a study using wavelet analysis of frontal auditory evoked potentials in healthy subjects and patients with schizophrenia. The study used a passive auditory oddball paradigm and analyzed neuro-electrical events associated with mismatch negativity and orienting responses, including N200/P300a components.

=== Cognitive neuroscience of schizophrenia ===
The Day Care Unit and Laboratory of Imaging and Brain Stimulation at Kfar Shaul participated in cognitive neuroscience research on procedural learning in schizophrenia. In a 2015 study in Frontiers in Human Neuroscience, patients with schizophrenia recruited from a day-hospitalization population at Kfar Shaul performed a serial reaction-time task over multiple practice days. The study reported that patients and controls could show similar speed gains, but that the learning process differed between groups: severe schizophrenia patients showed slower development of statistical learning and less sequence-specific chunking than controls.

The authors argued that similar behavioral improvement can mask different underlying learning mechanisms, suggesting that schizophrenia-related cognitive and motor-learning deficits may involve the organization and expression of procedural learning rather than simple absence of learning.

=== Neuromodulation and brain stimulation ===
Kfar Shaul has also been linked to research and clinical activity involving brain stimulation and neuromodulation. The hospital has had a Laboratory of Imaging and Brain Stimulation associated with its Day Care Unit, which appears in affiliations for cognitive neuroscience and interdisciplinary biomedical studies.

Kfar Shaul Mental Health Center was also listed as a study location in a clinical trial evaluating the Brainsway H-coil deep transcranial magnetic stimulation system for major depressive disorder. More recently, press coverage of a deep brain stimulation procedure for treatment-resistant obsessive-compulsive disorder described follow-up by Dr. Renana Eitan, director of the neuropsychiatric clinic at Kfar Shaul.

=== Epilepsy and neuropsychiatry ===
Researchers affiliated with Kfar Shaul-Eitanim and Hadassah have contributed to work at the interface of epilepsy, anxiety and functional neurological symptoms. A 2022 study in Seizure examined "seizure phobia" among adults with epilepsy and found that 27.5% of participants met criteria for seizure phobia; the condition was associated with anxiety disorders, past major depressive episode, post-traumatic stress disorder and psychogenic non-epileptic seizures, but not with epilepsy severity or duration. The article noted that, when the research was performed, one author was affiliated with the Jerusalem Center of Mental Health Kfar Shaul-Eitanim and Hadassah Medical Center's Department of Neurology.

=== Neuroscience education ===
Kfar Shaul has also appeared in research on neuroscience-based psychiatric education. A pilot study of Neuroscience-based Nomenclature as a teaching tool for medical students included psychiatry clerkship sites at Eitanim Mental Health Center and Kfar Shaul Mental Health Center. Neuroscience-based Nomenclature classifies psychotropic medications by pharmacological domain and mechanism rather than only by traditional clinical indication, reflecting a broader effort to connect psychiatry teaching with contemporary neuropsychopharmacology.

=== Legal and forensic psychiatry ===
Kfar Shaul-affiliated psychiatrists have published on legal and forensic aspects of psychiatric care in Israel, including compulsory ambulatory treatment and the medico-legal concept of judgment.

== Published research ==
- Bar-El, I. et al. "Psychiatric hospitalization of tourists in Jerusalem", Compr Psychiatry. 1991 May-Jun;32(3):238-44.
- Durst, R. et al. "Amnesiac state in a Holocaust survivor patient: Psychogenic versus neurological basis", Isr J Psychiatry Relat Sci. 1999;36(1):47-54.
- Durst, R. et al. "Kleptomania: diagnosis and treatment options", CNS Drugs. 2001;15(3):185-95.
- Katz, G. et al. "Time zone change and major psychiatric morbidity: The results of a 6-year study in Jerusalem", Compr Psychiatry. 2002 Jan-Feb;43(1):37-40.
- Raskin, Sergey. "The concept of judgment in the medico-legal context: A view from Israel", Journal of Psychiatric Intensive Care (2009), 5: 41–46.
- Zislin, Josef et al. "Male Genital Self-Mutilation in the Context of Religious Belief: The Jerusalem Syndrome", Transcultural Psychiatry, June 2002.

== See also ==
- Health in Israel
