= Feldheim Publishers =

American Orthodox Jewish publisher of Torah books and literature

- Parent company: Phillip Feldheim, Inc.
- Status: Active
- Founded: 1939
- Founder: Phillip Feldheim
- Country of origin: United States
- Headquarters location: Spring Valley, New York
- Key people: Yitzchak Feldheim, president
- Nonfiction topics: Jewish law, Torah, Talmud, Jewish lifestyle, Shabbat and Jewish holidays, Jewish history, biography, kosher cookbooks
- Official website: www.feldheim.com

Feldheim Publishers (or Feldheim) is an American Orthodox Jewish publisher of Torah books and literature. Its extensive catalog of titles includes books on Jewish law, Torah, Talmud, Jewish lifestyle, Shabbat and Jewish holidays, Jewish history, biography, and kosher cookbooks. It also publishes children's books. The company's headquarters is located in New York, with publishing and sales divisions in Jerusalem. Its president is Yitzchak Feldheim.

== History ==
Feldheim Publishers was founded in 1939 by Philipp Feldheim, a Viennese Jew who escaped Nazi Austria that year. He made his home in the Williamsburg section of Brooklyn, NYC where he was a founder of the Vienner Kehilla there. Later he moved to Washington Heights, New York near Congregation Khal Adath Jeshurun founded by Rabbi Dr. Joseph Breuer (1882–1980). Feldheim opened a small bookshop on the Lower East Side, and witnessing customer demand for Jewish literature, decided to go into Jewish publishing under the name Philipp Feldheim Inc.

Feldheim Publishers was the first to produce Torah books with professional graphics. It also pioneered the publication of biographies of modern-day Orthodox Jewish figures such as Rabbi Aryeh Levin (A Tzaddik in Our Time) and Rabbi Yaakov Yosef Herman (All For the Boss).

From the beginning, the company, which markets under the slogan “Torah Literature of Quality”, committed itself to publishing the classics of Torah literature. These included age-old classics such as Duties of the Heart (translation of Chovot ha-Levavot), The Path of the Just (translation of Mesillat Yesharim), The Way of God (translation of Derech Hashem), and The Kuzari: In Defense of the Despised Faith (by Rabbi Yehuda Halevi), along with modern works such as Strive for Truth (translation of Michtav MiEliyahu by Rabbi Eliyahu Eliezer Dessler), Shemirath Shabbath KiHilchatho (by Rabbi Yehoshua Neuwirth), and Book of Our Heritage (translation of Sefer HaToda’ah by Rabbi Eliyahu Kitov, translated by Rabbi Nachman Bulman). The Feldheim library includes most of the works by Samson Raphael Hirsch, including his collected writings and commentaries on the Chumash, siddur, Haggadah of Pesach, and Tehillim.

=== Distributor ===
Feldheim Publishers acted as Targum Press's distributor.

=== Israeli division ===
Feldheim established an Israeli division on Beit Hadfus Street in Jerusalem in 1960.

==== Bankruptcy ====
In February 2012 Feldheim's Israeli division declared bankruptcy. The filing was not connected with Philipp Feldheim, Inc., the New York publishing division.

== Authors published by Feldheim ==
- Joseph Breuer, (1882-1980) - rabbi and community leader in Germany and the US who wrote translations and commentaries on Biblical books.
- Pesach Eliyahu Falk - a posek known for his works concerning the Jewish laws of modesty.
- Aharon Feldman, (born 1932) - an Orthodox Jewish rabbi and rosh yeshiva.
- Emanuel Feldman, (born 1927) - an editor, writer and spokesman for Orthodox Jewry.
- Samson Raphael Hirsch, (1808-1888) - German rabbi and philosopher who influenced the development of Orthodox Judaism.
- Moshe Hubner - a Brooklyn-based rabbi, author, and high school teacher.
- Dovid Kaplan - an Orthodox Jewish rabbi, kiruv educator, author, and speaker.
- Yehuda (Leo) Levi, (born 1926) - author of several books on Science and Judaism.
- Yehoshua Neuwirth, (1927 - 2013) - was an Orthodox Jewish rabbi who wrote an authoritative work on the Shabbath.
- Nosson Dovid Rabinowich - an American scholar of classical and medieval Jewish history.
- Ruchoma Shain (1914–2013) – author of the best-selling All for the Boss (1984), a biography of her father, Yaakov Yosef Herman
- Yaakov Sprung Orthodox Jewish Rabbi, Orator and Community Leader
- Nathan Sternfeld - children's author of Adventures with Rebbe Mendel series.
- Yisroel Taplin - an American Talmud scholar and author of a work on Jewish Law.
- Hanoch Teller, (born 1956) - Orthodox Jewish rabbi and author of over 25 books of true, contemporary stories.
