= Horowitz family =

Levitical Ashkenazi rabbinic family

Horowitz family האָראָװיץ
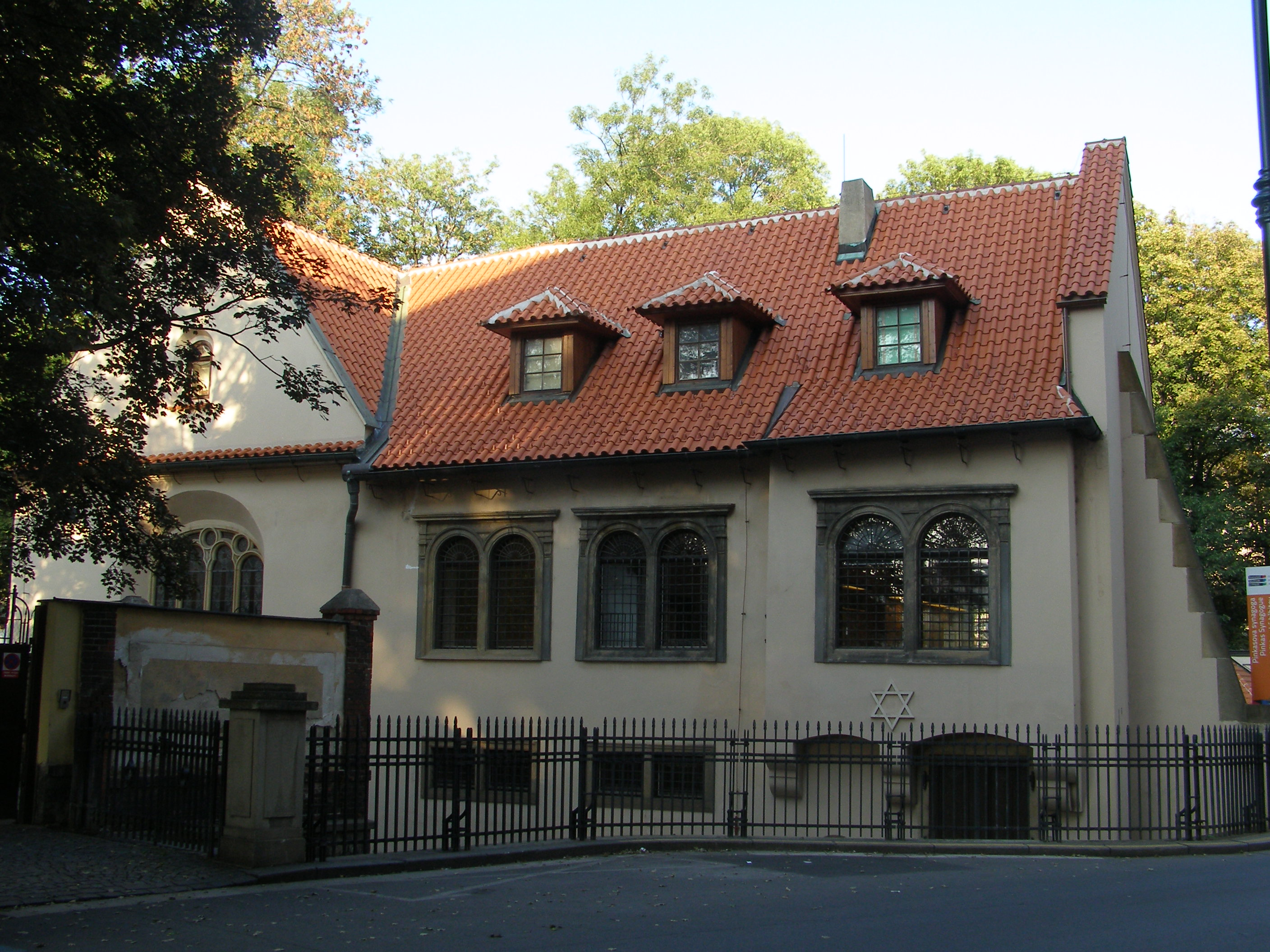
- The Pinkas Synagogue built by R. Aaron Meshullam Horowitz and named after his grandson R. Pinkas Horowitz.
- Parent family: Yizhari of Girona
- Current region: Prague, North America, Argentina and Israel
- Earlier spellings: Ish-Horowitz
- Origin: Hořovice, Bohemia
- Founded: 1391
- Founder: R. Joseph HaLevi of Hořovice
- Traditions: Judaism
- Cadet branches: Nikolsburg Hasidic dynasty Boston Hasidic dynasty; Ropshitz Hasidic dynasty Melitz Hasidic dynasty Linsk Hasidic dynasty
- Website: www.horowitzassociation.org

The Horowitz family (Hebrew: הוֹרוֹביץ, Yiddish: האָראָװיץ) is a prominent Ashkenazi Levitical rabbinic family that is widely acknowledged for its ancient and well-chronicled Levitical pedigree. The family chiefly descends from Rabbi Joseph HaLevi, who settled in Hořovice, Bohemia, (German: Horschowitz or Horowitz) in 1391 and adopted the surname "Ish-Horowitz" (lit. 'Man of Horowitz').

From the 16th century and onward, the family dominated the Prague community and formed marriage alliances with other prestigious families. They later spread out to Eastern European communities, and produced numerous rabbis and communal leaders. Following the rise of the Haskalah, the family produced several writers of the Enlightenment, scholars, musicians, and scientists.

== Origins ==
The Horowitz family preserved a tradition that Joseph HaLevi of Hořovice was originally from Girona, Spain, and a direct paternal descendant of Zerachiah HaLevi of Girona. Zerachiah HaLevi traced his lineage to the Yizhari family of Girona; he asserted paternal descent from Heman the Ezrahite, the grandson of the Biblical prophet Samuel. Heman, in turn, was a direct paternal descendant of Yizhar, the son of Kehath, who was the eponymous ancestor of the Yizhari family of Girona.

The Horowitz family has traditionally maintained a connection to its patriarch, the aforementioned Samuel. This connection is exemplified by Shmuel Shmelke Horowitz of Nikolsburg (1726–1778). On his deathbed, he is recorded to have declared, "You should know that my soul is that of the Prophet Samuel. Proof of this is that my name, like the prophet's, is Samuel. The prophet was a Levi, and so am I. The Prophet Samuel lived to be 52 years, and I am today 52 years old. Only the prophet was called Samuel, but I have remained Shmelke."

== Early history ==
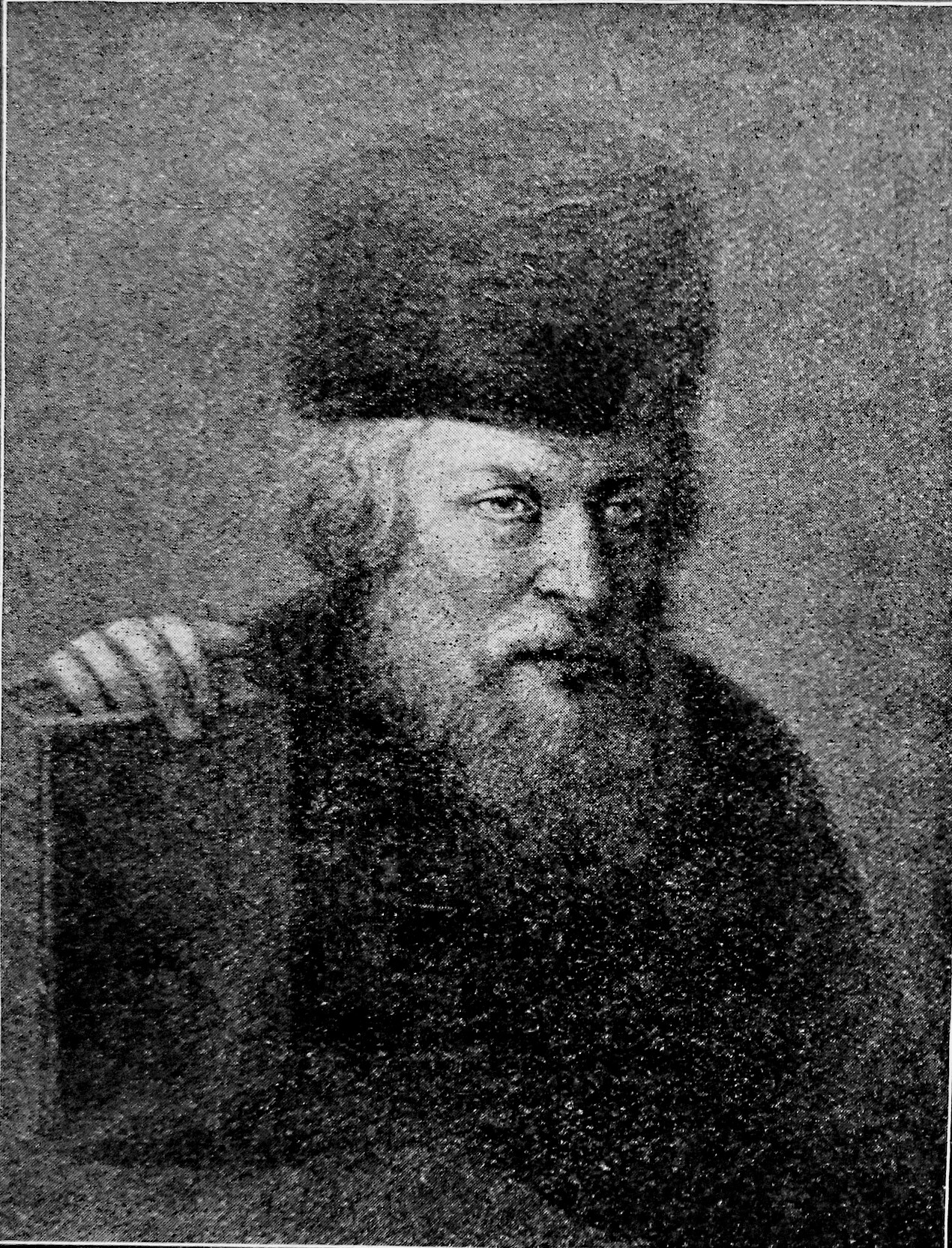
Painting of R. Shabbethai Horowitz (1590–1660) from the Jewish museum of Prague

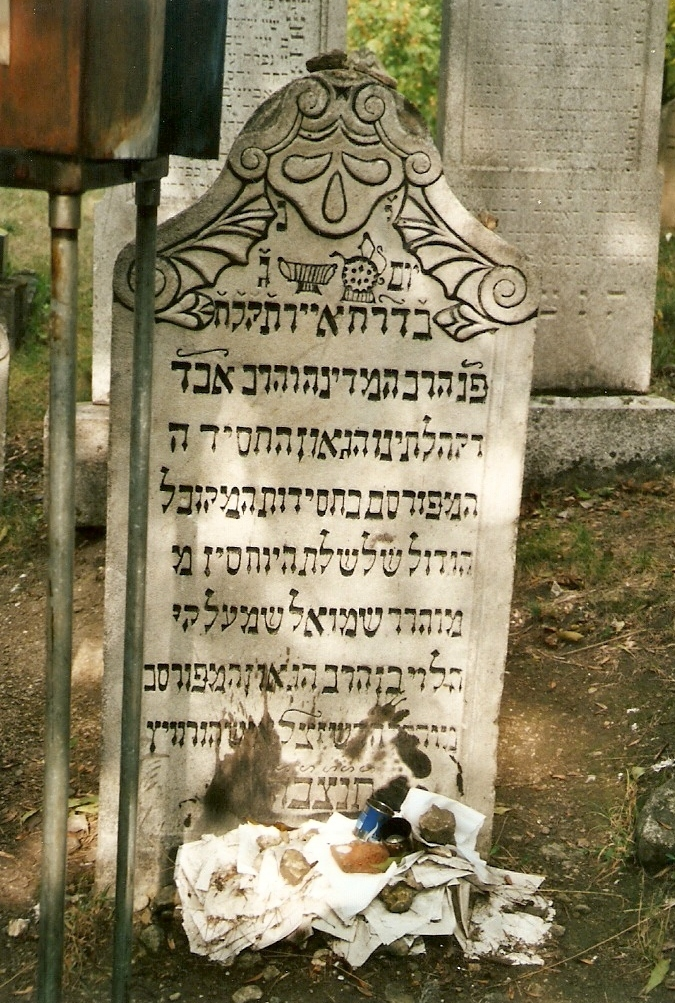
Grave of R. Shmelke Horowitz in Nikolsburg.

As the Jewish community in Prague expanded and the Bohemian Diet enacted land rights reform in 1501, permitting increased Jewish ownership of real estate in the city, the Horowitz family opted to sell its holdings in Hořovice. Consequently, in the early 16th century, they relocated to Prague and adopted the Horowitz surname.

Joseph of Hořovice's son, Rabbi Aaron Meshullam Horowitz, constructed the Pinkas Synagogue in Prague and had eight children; the children would later form the foundation of the Horowitz family. Some family members, including Shabtai Sheftel Horowitz (1565–1619) and Isaiah Horowitz (1555–1630), eventually left Prague and established themselves in the Polish–Lithuanian Commonwealth. Isaiah held rabbinic roles in Dubno and Ostróg before settling in Tiberias. He died in Tiberias; he sparked a kabbalistic revival in sixteenth-century Palestine.

Isaiah, a disciple of Moses Isserles, played a key role in spreading Isserles' Talmudic approach across Europe. Connections between the Horowitzes and Isserles grew as members of the Horowitz family married those from the Isserles family. Isaiah authored the work Shenei Luḥot HaBerit, which later become a principle work of European Kabbalah. His son, Shabbethai Horowitz (1590–1660), was a prominent Talmudist and rabbinic figure in Ostroh, Fürth, Frankfurt am Main, and Vienna.

== Later history ==
=== Hasidism ===
One particularly prominent branch of the family descends from R. Meir Horowitz (1656–1746), who was one of two Rabbis known as the "Maharam of Tiktin" (The other was a contemporary if his, Rabbi Menachem of Tiktin). This was because at the end of his life R. Meir occupied the position of Chief Rabbi in Tiktin. Both his grandsons R. Shmuel Shmelke Horowitz of Nikolsburg (1726–1778) and R. Pinchas Horowitz of Frankfurt (1731–1805) where disciples of R. Dov Ber of Mezeritch and established the Horowitz family as leading figures in the rise of Hasidism.

R. Pinchas's son R. Tzvi Hirsch Horowitz (1753-1817) succeeded him as Chief Rabbi of Frankfurt and authored the work "Macheneh Levi".

R. Shmelke had two sons, his eldest son R. Zevi Joshua Horowitz (1760–1816) authored the work "Hiddushei ha-Ribash" and is the progenitor of the Nikolsburg Hasidic dynasty which includes the Boston Hasidic dynasty founded by R. Zevi Joshua's descendant R. Pinchas David Horowitz (1876–1941) in 1915. His descendants include the second Bostoner Rebbe, R. Levi Yitzchak Horowitz (1921–2009), his son's R. Mayer Alter Horowitz and R. Naftali Yehuda Horowitz and his nephew R. Chaim Avrohom Horowitz (1933–2016) and his nephew's son R. Yaakov Yitzchak Horowitz.

Another descendant of R. Zevi Joshua is R. Elijah Horowitz-Winogradow (1842–1878) who served as the Hasidic rabbi of Lida and had several descendants and family members who became prominent members of the Haskalah such as his grandson, the Polish artist Aleksander Żyw. R. Elijah's sister, Leah is an ancestor of the Beloff family which include Max Beloff, Baron Beloff (1913–1999), Renee Beloff (1916–1998), Leah Nora Beloff (1919–1997), John Beloff (1920–2006) and Anne Ethel Beloff-Chain, Lady Chain (1921–1991).

R. Shmelke's younger son R. Jacob Horowitz (1765–1805) immigrated to Hungary and is ancestor of Regina Horowitz-Margareten (1863–1959) who founded Horowitz-Margareten Matzohs which is now one of the largest Matzoh companies in North America.

R. Meir's grandson, R. Isaac Horowitz of Hamburg (1715–1767) was the maternal grandfather of R. Naftali Zvi Horowitz (nee Rubin) (1760–1827) who adopted his mother's maiden name and founded the Ropshitz Hasidic dynasty, which includes the Melitz Hasidic dynasty and Linsk Hasidic dynasty. R. Meir's great-grandson was R. Yisrael Friedman of Ruzhin who is the progenitor of the Bohush, Boyan, Chortkov, Husiatyn, Sadigura, and Shtefanesh Hasidic dynasties.

Other members of the family also achieved great prominence in Hasidic circles such as R. Yaakov Yitzchak Horowitz of Lublin (1745–1815) who is a progenitor of the Chentshin Hasidic dynasty and R. Aaron Horowitz who founded the Strashelye Hasidic dynasty. For this reason, the founder of Hasidism, the Baal Shem Tov, considered the Horowitz family to be one of the three families of pure lineage in the Jewish nation holding the position of Levites, the other two being the Rappaport family, who are Kohanim, and Shapiro, who are Israelites. Another reading states the family name Margaliot, in place of Shapiro, or in place of Rappaport.

=== Non-Hassidic rabbis ===
R. Moshe Meshullam Horowitz (1832–1894) was a rabbi in Galicia.

R. Yosef Yozel Horwitz (1847–1919), was an important rabbi in the Musar movement, founding seventy yeshivos across Eastern Europe. Of those yeshivos, many followed his unique style of mussar; the first one of these was founded in Novogrudok, giving the style the name "Novhardok mussar", and Rabbi Horwitz the name "The Alter of Novhardok."

=== Haskalah ===
Following the rise of the Haskalah many members of the family became prominent writers, musicians and scientists such as the Russian pianist Vladimir Horowitz (1903–1989), the Yiddish playwright Moses Horowitz (1844–1910), the Bohemian Yiddish author Bella Horwitz, the German chess master, Bernhard Horwitz (1807–1885), the American surgeon Phineas Jonathan Horwitz (1822–1904), the German mathematician Adolf Hurwitz (1859–1919), the English professor Hyman Hurwitz (1770–1844) and the Polish mathematician Witold Hurewicz (1904–1956).

== DNA ==
In 2016 historian and genealogist Edward Gelles established through autosomal DNA the traditional belief concerning the descent of the Levitic Horowitz lines from the Yizhari family of Girona. In 2017 the journal Scientific Reports confirmed that the genealogical records for three of the individuals with the Horowitz surname converged to a common male ancestor born at 1615 CE or 402 ybp.
