= Beloff =

Beloff is a surname of a number of people:

- Angelina Beloff (1879–1969), Russian painter and sculptor
- Evan Beloff, Canadian film writer, producer, and director
- Elena Beloff, American filmmaker and author
- Jim Beloff (born 1955), Ukulele musician, Publisher
- John Beloff (1920–2006), English psychology professor
- Leland Beloff (born 1942), Pennsylvania politician
- Max Beloff, Baron Beloff (1913–1999), British historian and principal of the University College of Buckingham
- Michael Beloff (born 1942), English barrister
- Zoe Beloff (born 1958), British visual artist

== See also ==
- Anne Beloff-Chain (1921–1991), British biochemist
- Stefan Bellof (1957–1985), German racing driver
