= Ernst Chain =

German-born British biochemist (1906–1979)

Sir Ernst Chain FRS FRSA
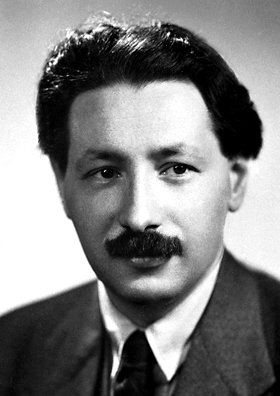
- Chain in 1945
- Born: Ernst Boris Chain; 19 June 1906; Berlin, German Empire
- Died: 12 August 1979 (aged 73); Castlebar, County Mayo, Ireland
- Citizenship: German (until 1939); British (from 1939)
- Education: Friedrich Wilhelm University; Fitzwilliam College, Cambridge
- Known for: Discovery of penicillin
- Spouse: Anne Beloff (m. 1948)
- Children: 3
- Awards: Nobel Prize in Physiology or Medicine (1945); Fellow of the Royal Society (1948); Paul Ehrlich and Ludwig Darmstaedter Prize (1954); Knight Bachelor (1969)
- Scientific career
- Fields: Biochemistry
- Workplaces: Imperial College London; University of Cambridge; University of Oxford; Istituto Superiore di Sanità; University College Hospital

Sir Ernst Boris Chain (19 June 1906 – 12 August 1979) was a German-born British biochemist. He shared the 1945 Nobel Prize in Physiology or Medicine with Alexander Fleming and Howard Florey "for the discovery of penicillin and its curative effect in various infectious diseases".

== Life and career ==
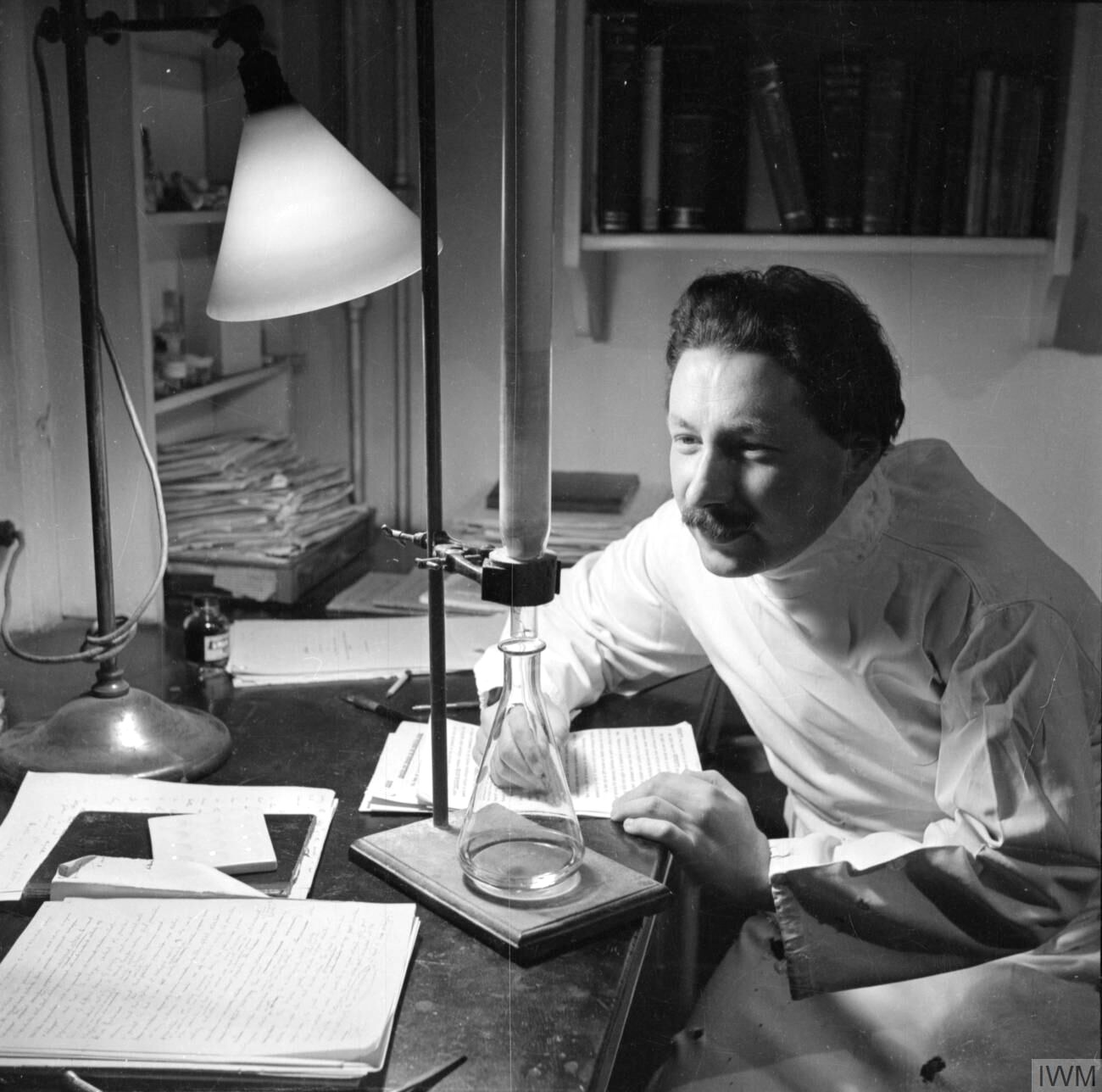
Dr Ernst Chain undertakes an experiment in his laboratory at the School of Pathology at Oxford University in 1944

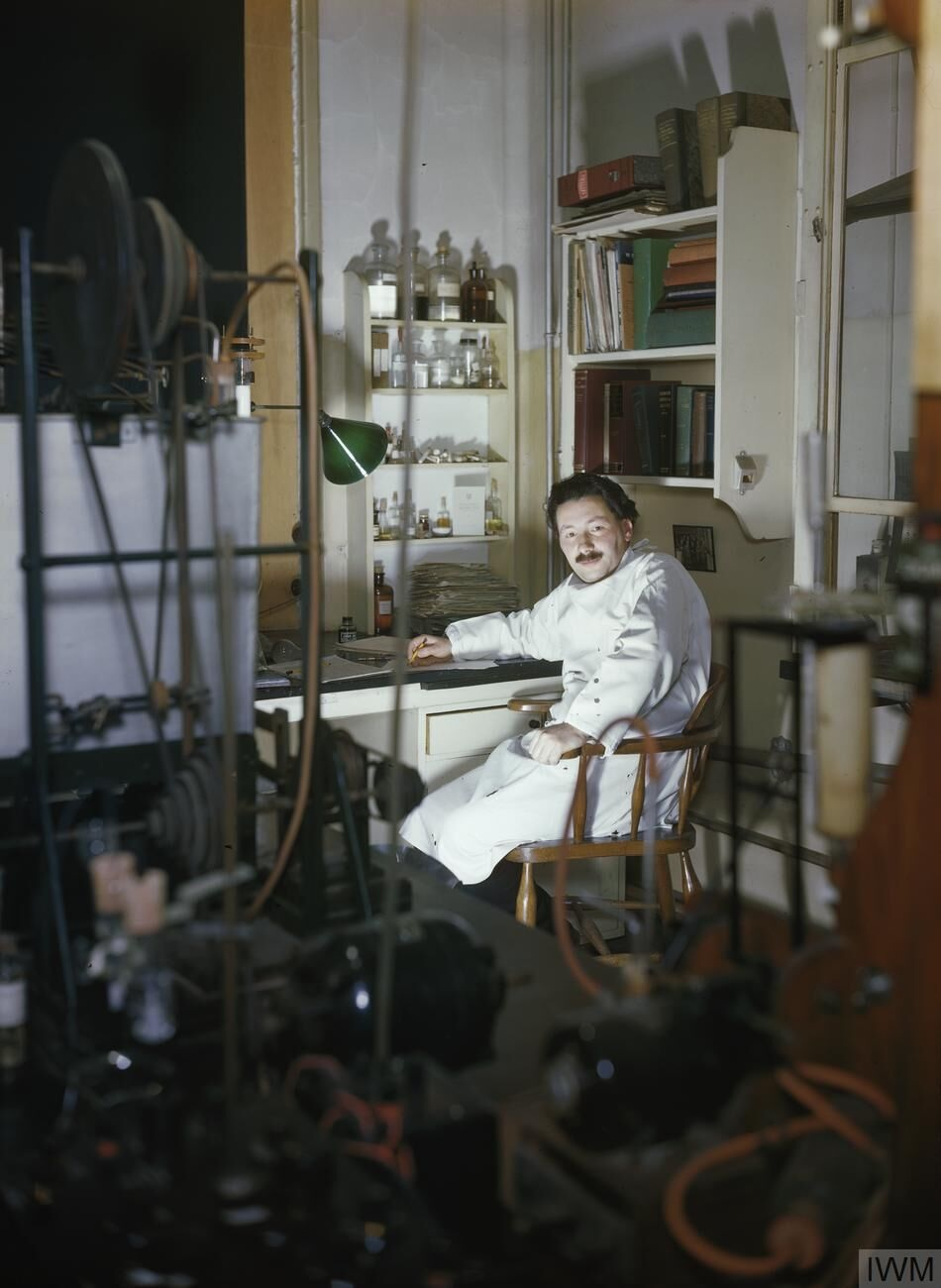
Ernst Chain in his laboratory.

Chain was born to a German-Jewish family in Berlin, the son of Margarete (née Eisner) and Michael Chain, a chemist and industrialist dealing in chemical products. His father was a Russian-Jewish émigré from Mogilev (Russian Empire, now Belarus) to study chemistry abroad and his mother was from Berlin. In 1930, he received his degree in chemistry from Friedrich Wilhelm University. He was a lifelong friend of Professor Albert Neuberger, whom he met in Berlin in the 1930s.

After the Nazis came to power, Chain understood that, being Jewish, he would no longer be safe in Germany. He left Germany and moved to England, arriving on 2 April 1933 with £10 in his pocket. Geneticist and physiologist J. B. S. Haldane helped him obtain a position at University College Hospital, London.

After a couple of months he was accepted as a PhD student at Fitzwilliam College, Cambridge, where he began working on phospholipids under the direction of Sir Frederick Gowland Hopkins. In 1935, he accepted a job at Oxford University as a lecturer in pathology. During this time he worked on a range of research topics, including snake venoms, tumour metabolism, lysozymes, and biochemistry techniques. Chain was naturalised as a British subject in April 1939.

In 1939, he joined Howard Florey to investigate natural antibacterial agents produced by microorganisms. This led him and Florey, with crucial technical help from Norman Heatley, to revisit the work of Alexander Fleming, who had described penicillin nine years earlier. Chain and Florey went on to demonstrate penicillin's therapeutic action and its chemical composition. They discovered how to isolate and concentrate the germ-killing agent in the Penicillium mould. For this research, Chain, Florey, and Fleming received the Nobel Prize in 1945. For his part, Heatley was awarded an honorary Doctorate of Medicine by Oxford University in 1990.

Along with Edward Abraham he was also involved in theorising the beta-lactam structure of penicillin in 1942, which was confirmed by X-ray crystallography done by Dorothy Hodgkin in 1945. Towards the end of World War II, Chain learned his mother and sister had been killed by the Nazis. After World War II, Chain moved to Rome, to work at the Istituto Superiore di Sanità (Superior Institute of Health). He returned to Britain in 1964 as the founder and head of the biochemistry department at Imperial College London, where he stayed until his retirement, specialising in fermentation technologies.

On 17 March 1948 Chain was appointed a Fellow of the Royal Society.

In spite of his successful scientific career and widespread recognition from his Nobel Prize, Chain was for some time barred from entry to the United States under the McCarran Internal Security Act of 1950, being declined a visa on two occasions in 1951.

In 1948, he married Anne Beloff, sister of Renee Beloff, Max Beloff, John Beloff and Nora Beloff, and a biochemist of significant standing herself. In his later life, his Jewish identity became increasingly important to him. Chain was an ardent Zionist and he became a member of the board of governors of the Weizmann Institute of Science at Rehovot in 1954, and later a member of the executive council. He raised his children securely within the Jewish faith, arranging much extracurricular tuition for them. His views were expressed most clearly in his speech 'Why I am a Jew' given at the World Jewish Congress Conference of Intellectuals in 1965.

Chain was appointed Knight Bachelor in the 1969 Birthday Honours.

Chain died in 1979 at the Mayo General Hospital in Castlebar, Ireland. The Imperial College London biochemistry building is named after him, as is a road in Castlebar.

== See also ==
- List of Jewish Nobel laureates

== Bibliography ==
- Medawar, Jean; Pyke, David (2012). Hitler's Gift: The True Story of the Scientists Expelled by the Nazi Regime (Paperback). New York: Arcade Publishing. ISBN 978-1-61145-709-4.
