= Nora Beloff =

English journalist and political writer

- Beloff in an undated photograph
- Born: Leah Nora Beloff; 24 January 1919; Kensington, London, England
- Died: 12 February 1997 (aged 78); Royal Free Hospital, London, England
- Education: King Alfred School, London
- Alma mater: Lady Margaret Hall, Oxford
- Occupations: Journalist, political writer
- Employer: The Observer
- Notable work: First female political correspondent for a British newspaper
- Spouse: Clifford Makins (m. 1977–1990)
- Relatives: Max Beloff, Baron Beloff (brother), Anne Beloff-Chain (sister), John Beloff (brother), Renee Soskin (sister)

Leah Nora Beloff (24 January 1919 – 12 February 1997) was an English journalist and political writer. She worked for The Observer for three decades, from 1948 to 1978, and became a political correspondent in 1964, making her the first woman in such a role for a British newspaper.

== Early life ==
Beloff was born in Kensington, London to Semion (Simon) Beloff (born Semion Rubinowicz) and Maria (Marie) Katzin. Her parents were of Russian–Jewish background, and her siblings included the historian Max Beloff, Baron Beloff, the psychologist John Beloff, the biochemist Anne Beloff-Chain and the headmistress Renee Soskin. Her paternal great-grandmother was Leah Horowitz-Winograd, the sister Eliyahu Shlomo Horowitz-Winograd and a descendant of the Hasidic master, Shmelke Horowitz of Nikolsburg (1726-1778). She attended King Alfred School and read history at Lady Margaret Hall, Oxford, graduating in 1940.

== Career ==
After graduating from Oxford, Beloff worked for the British Foreign Office in 1941, joining its political intelligence department. She moved to Paris in 1944 to work for the British embassy, and stayed in Paris after World War II to work for Reuters. She worked for The Economist (1946–1948) and then The Observer as a Paris-based correspondent. She left Paris to cover the Cold War for The Observer from Washington, D.C. (1949–51), and Moscow. Her work first attracted significant attention during the Algerian War, when she reported on the torture of two women rebels, Djamila Bouhired and Djamila Boupacha, by French soldiers.

In 1964 she returned to London following her appointment as a political correspondent for The Observer; this made her the first woman political correspondent of a British newspaper. In this role, she often wrote critical pieces about the Labour Party, and Labour Prime Minister Harold Wilson consequently petitioned The Observer to dismiss her. She remained in this post until 1976, and then worked as a special correspondent. Beloff left The Observer in 1978 after 30 years due to disagreements with its new editor, Donald Trelford.

Beloff wrote six books during her career: The General Said No (1963), Transit of Britain (1973), Freedom under Foot (1976), No Travel Like Russian Travel (1979), Tito's Flawed Legacy (1985) and Yugoslavia: An Avoidable War (published posthumously in 1997). She travelled extensively across Europe in her later career and, while reporting on the persecution of Soviet Jews, was arrested in Georgia and expelled from Yugoslavia.

She was long lampooned in the satirical magazine Private Eye under the nickname "Nora Ballsoff". She fought two legal actions against the magazine; she won libel damages of £3,000 but lost a breach of copyright action.

== Personal life and death ==
Beloff was married to Clifford Makins, a sports editor for The Observer, from 1977 until his death in 1990. She died of a pulmonary embolism secondary to Hodgkin's lymphoma at the Royal Free Hospital, London, in 1997. After her death, Beloff's former editor Donald Trelford wrote that she "had one of the most distinguished careers any woman has had in British journalism".
