= Regina Margareten =

Hungarian-American entrepreneur

- Born: Rebush/Hannah Rivka Horowitz; December 20 or 25, 1863; Miskolc, Austrian Empire
- Died: January 15, 1959 (aged 95); New York City, New York, United States
- Occupation: Business owner
- Spouse: Ignatz Margareten
- Parents: Jacob Horowitz (father); Mirel Chayah (Mary) Horowitz (nee Brunner) (mother)

Regina Margareten (December 20 or 25, 1863 – January 15, 1959) was a Hungarian-American entrepreneur, who became known as the "Matzoh Queen" of New York City. She immigrated to the United States in 1883, where the family set up a business which grew into kosher food manufacturers Horowitz Brothers and Margareten Company. She was profiled several times by The New York Times, and continued to attend to the business until two weeks prior to her death.

== Career ==
Regina Margareten was born in Miskolc, Hungary, on either December 20 or 25, 1863, to Jacob Horowitz and his wife Miral Chayah Horowitz (née Brunner), who went by the name of Mary. At birth, Margareten was known as both Rebush and Hannah Rivka. Her father was a paternal descendant of Shmelke Horowitz from the Nikolsburg Hasidic dynasty. While pregnant, she emigrated with her husband Ignatz Margareten and her parents in 1883 to the United States, where they settled in New York City. They opened a grocery store on the Lower East Side, as they wanted to continue following Orthodox Judaism. They made their own matzoh for their first Passover while in the United States, and this grew over the following years to become the sole object of the family's business in New York, which was known as Horowitz Brothers and Margareten Company.

The business grew from using a rented bakery in their first year, to having a turnover of more than a million dollars in 1931. Margareten would make checks on the matzoh routinely throughout each day, and proposed the use of wheat from three different American states to improve the quality of the matzoh, and expand the business into other kosher products. When her husband died in 1923, she became treasurer of the company. During the 1940s and 50's, she would speak on the local radio just prior to Passover in both Yiddish and English. When the city took over the original business location in 1945, Margareten oversaw the opening of a larger facility in Long Island City. Margareten was profiled on several occasions in later life by The New York Times, on her 80th birthday in 1942, on her 91st in 1953 and finally on December 24, 1957. She continued to visit the plant daily until two weeks prior to her death at the age of 95 on January 15, 1959. In her obituary, The New York Times described her as the "Matzoh Queen".

== Personal life ==
Regina Margareten was the matriarch of the extended family. She owned property near Hunter Mountain in New York State, and established Margareten Park in Hunter, New York. During the 1920s and 30s, she returned to Hungary on a yearly basis to visit family, once flying the London to Paris part of the journey during the 1920s. Margareten invested in a coal mine in Edelény, Hungary, in 1924, which resulted in jobs for many local family members. Following the start of the Second World War, she and her son Jacob arranged for many members of the Hungarian side of the family to come to the United States.

== Sources ==
- Hyman, Paula; Dash Moore, Deborah (1998). Jewish Women in America. New York: Routledge. ISBN 978-0-415919-357.
