= Woodbourne Correctional Facility =

Medium-security state prison, located in New York, US

Coordinates: 41°45′14″N 74°35′35″W

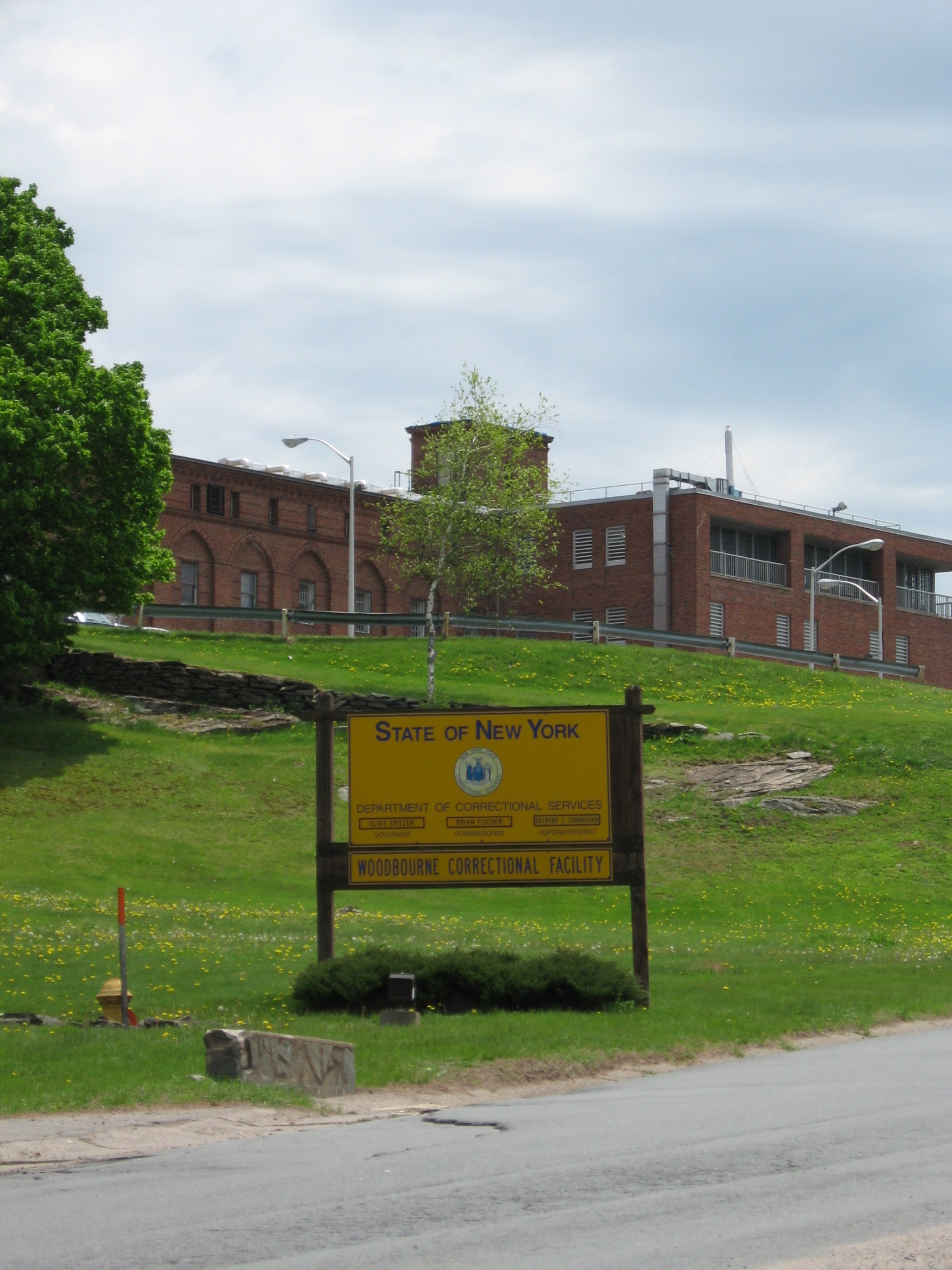
- Interactive map of Woodbourne Correctional Facility
- Location: 99 Prison Road Woodbourne, New York
- Status: operational
- Security class: medium
- Capacity: 849
- Opened: 1933
- Managed by: New York State Department of Corrections and Community Supervision

Woodbourne Correctional Facility is a medium security men's prison operated by the New York State Department of Corrections and Community Supervision in Woodbourne in Sullivan County, New York. It is located on the same tract of land as maximum security Sullivan Correctional Facility.

The prison opened in 1933, designed by Alfred Hopkins, an estate architect with a sideline in prisons such as Lewisburg Federal Penitentiary in Pennsylvania. Hopkins also designed Wallkill Correctional Facility and Coxsackie Correctional Facility for the state.

== Notable inmates ==
- Juvenile murderer Willie Bosket, serving three consecutive sentences of 25 years to life for offenses committed while in the Shawangunk Correctional Facility and at Woodbourne. Bosket was housed in a specially-constructed plexiglass-lined cell in complete isolation but is no longer at Woodbourne.
- Rapper Shyne of Brooklyn served part of a 10-year sentence in Woodbourne, after being convicted of first-degree assault and reckless endangerment.
- Eric Smith, serving 9 years to life for the murder of Derrick Robie; released in 2022.
