= Max Beloff, Baron Beloff =

British historian and peer (1913–1999)

Max Beloff

Max Beloff, Baron Beloff, FBA, FRHistS, FRSA (2 July 1913 – 22 March 1999) was a British historian and Conservative peer. From 1974 to 1979 he was principal of the University College of Buckingham, now the University of Buckingham.

== Early life ==
Beloff was born on 2 July 1913 at 21 York House, Fieldway Crescent, Islington, London and was the oldest child of a Russian-Jewish family who had moved to England in 1903 from the Russian Empire. He was the elder son in a family of five children of merchant Semion (Simon) Beloff (born Semion Rubinowicz) and his wife Maria (Marie) Katzin. His sister Anne later married German-born Nobel Prize–winning biochemist Ernst Boris Chain in 1948. His sister Renee Soskin was a politician and educationalist. His other sister Nora Beloff was a journalist and political correspondent. His brother was the psychologist John Beloff. His paternal great-grandmother was Leah Horowitz-Winograd, the sister Eliyahu Shlomo Horowitz-Winograd and a descendant of the Hasidic master, Shmelke Horowitz of Nikolsburg (1726-1778). The young Beloff was educated at St Paul's School, and then studied Modern History at Corpus Christi College, Oxford where he graduated with first-class honours. (Scholar; MA; Honorary Fellow, 1993).

== Politics ==
In his 1992 autobiographical work A Historian in the Twentieth Century Beloff discusses his political journey. He had been at school a conservative, was then attracted to socialism once at university and became a liberal after the Second World War. In 1962, during public debate of the case for a referendum on whether to join the European Economic Community, he argued that a referendum is not meaningful unless clear alternatives are set before the electorate; in the absence of such clarity, "the electorate would... be doing no more than indicating a very general bias one way or another" ('"The Case against a Referendumˮ", The Observer, 21 October 1962, p. 11).

In the debate about educational standards in the 1960s, he found the Labour government hostile to his idea of a university outside the state-financed framework and felt the Liberal Party was "moving increasingly to the left". That inclined him to join the Conservative Party upon his retirement in 1979.

He received a knighthood in 1980, and on 26 May 1981 he was created a life peer, taking the title Baron Beloff, of Wolvercote in the County of Oxfordshire. He spoke often on educational and constitutional matters in the House of Lords and, outside of the chamber, continued to write. He was a strong Eurosceptic and argued that Britain's history made it incompatible with membership of the European Union, which led to him writing Britain and European Union: Dialogue of the Deaf, published in 1996.

In 1990 Lord Beloff was one of the leading historians behind the setting up of the History Curriculum Association. The Association advocated a more knowledge-based history curriculum in schools. It expressed "profound disquiet" at the way history was being taught in the classroom and observed that the integrity of history was threatened. In a House of Lords debate on 21 July 1989 he supported the two Lewes teachers, Chris McGovern and Dr Anthony Freeman who suffered redeployment following their criticism of the academic quality of what was then the new GCSE examination.

He was a strong opponent of New Labour's House of Lords Bill and gave many speeches in the chamber defending the hereditary principle; however, he died before the bill was passed. He gave his final speech in the House of Lords on 22 March 1999, the day he died.

== Career ==
- Junior Research Fellow, Corpus Christi College, 1937
- Assistant Lecturer in History, Manchester University, 1939–46
  - World War II service: Royal Corps of Signals, 1940–41.
- Nuffield Reader in Comparative Study of Institutions, Oxford University, 1946–56

In 1954, he delivered the Albert Shaw Lectures on Diplomatic History at Johns Hopkins University for that year, with the lectures later published as Foreign Policy and the Democratic Process.

- Fellow of Nuffield College, Oxford, 1947–57
- Gladstone Professor of Government and Public Administration, Oxford University, 1957–74, then Professor Emeritus
- Fellow, All Souls College, Oxford, 1957–74, Emeritus Fellow, 1980–99
- Supernumerary Fellow, St Antony's College, Oxford, 1975–84
- Principal, University College of Buckingham, 1974–79
- Honorary Professor, St Andrews University, 1993–98.

He became governor of the University of Haifa, and was knighted in 1980 and elevated to a life peerage with the title Baron Beloff, of Wolvercote in the County of Oxfordshire on 26 May 1981. After his death the University of Buckingham established 'The Max Beloff Centre for the Study of Liberty' in January 2005.

== Works ==
- Public order and popular disturbances 1660–1714 (1938).
- The Foreign Policy of Soviet Russia 1929–41 (2 volumes) (1947/1949).
- Thomas Jefferson and American Democracy (1948).
- Soviet Policy in the Far East, 1944–51 (1953).
- The Age of Absolutism, 1660–1815 (1954).
- Foreign Policy and the Democratic Press (1955).
- Europe and the Europeans (1957).
- The Great Powers (1959).
- New Dimensions in Foreign Policy (1961).
- The United States and the Unity of Europe (1963).
- The Balance of Power (1968).
- Imperial Sunset-Volume 1: Britain's Liberal Empire 1897–1921 (1969).
- The American Federal Government (1969).
- The Future of British Foreign Policy (1969).
- The Intellectual in Politics and Other Essays. London: Wedenfeld and Nicolson. 1970. ISBN 978-0-297-00205-5 – via Internet Archive. .
- The Tide of Collectivism- Can it be Turned? (1978).
- The State and its servants (1979).
- The Government of the United Kingdom (with Gillian Peele) (1980).
- Wars and Welfare: Britain, 1941–1945 (1984).
- Imperial Sunset-Volume 2: Dream of Commonwealth 1921–42 (1989).
- An Historian in the Twentieth Century (1992).
- Britain and European Union: Dialogue of the Deaf (1996).

Works edited by Beloff include:

- History: Mankind and his story (1948).
- The Federalist (1948).
- The Debate on the American Revolution, 1761–1783 (1949).
- Europe and the Europeans: an International Discussion (1957).
- On the track of tyranny: essays presented by the Wiener Library to Leonard G. Montefiore (1960).
- American Political Institutions in the 1970s (with Vivian Vale) (1975).
- Beyond the Soviet Union: the fragmentation of power (1997).

== Sources ==
- Hutchinson's Encyclopaedia of Britain
- Who was Who
- The Times, 24 March 1999, p23
- Cameron-Watt, D. (2004) 'Max Beloff', Oxford Dictionary of National Biography.
- Crick, Bernard (25 March 1999). "Lord Beloff obituary: Loose and loud cannon". The Guardian.
- Johnson, Nevil (26 March 1999). "Obituary: Max Beloff". The Independent.
- Johnson, Nevil (2003). "Max Beloff, 1913–1999". Proceedings of the British Academy. 120: 21–40.
