= B'nai Israel Synagogue (Woodbourne, New York) =

Synagogue in Sullivan County, New York, US

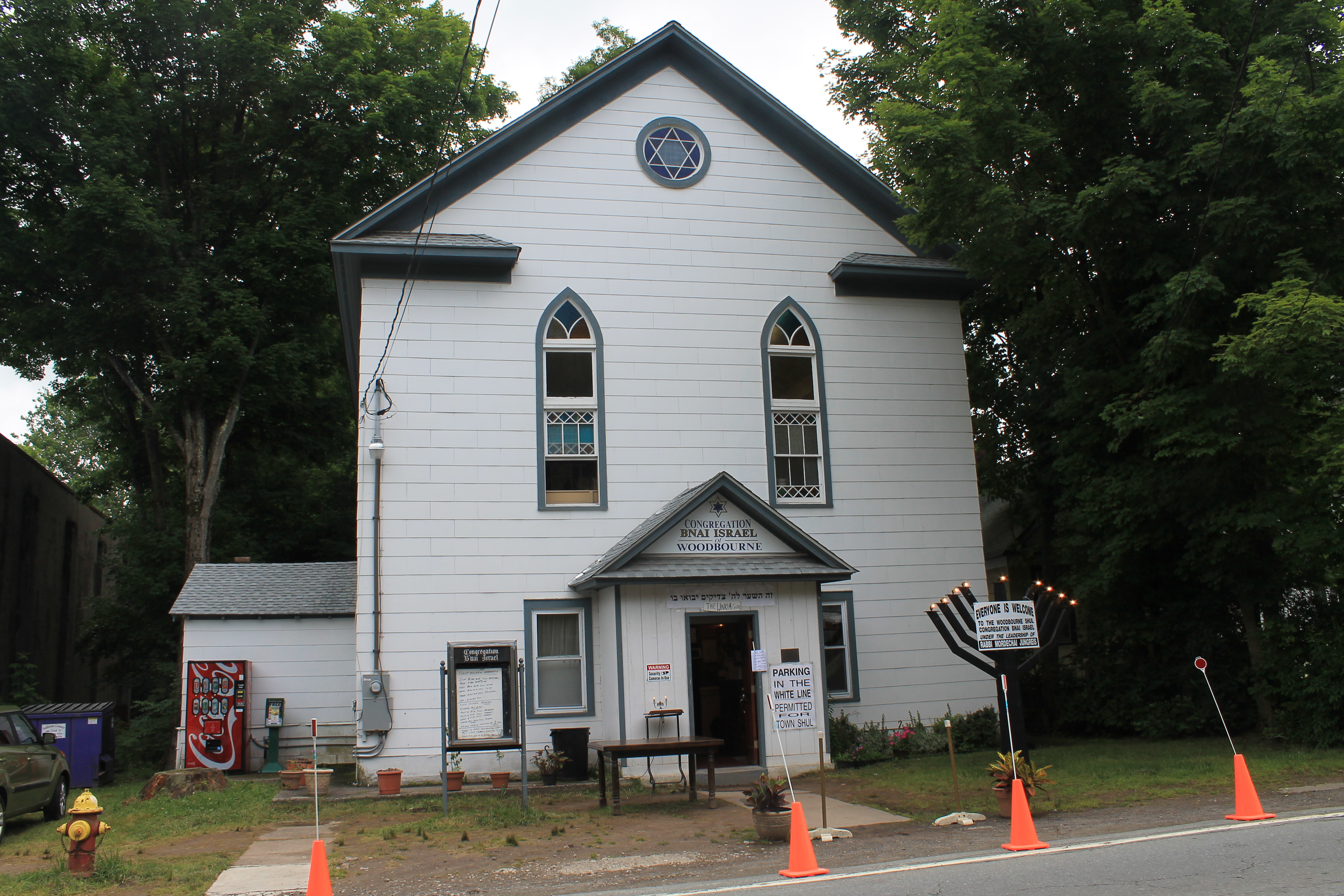
- Front of the synagogue, in 2012

- Location in New York

Religion
- Affiliation: Orthodox Judaism
- Rite: Nusach Ashkenaz
- Ecclesiastical or organisational status: Synagogue
- Leadership: Rabbi Mordechai Jungreis
- Status: Active

Location
- Location: 457 NY Route 52, Woodbourne, New York 12788
- Country: United States
- Coordinates: 41°45′29″N 74°36′08″W

Architecture
- Type: Synagogue architecture
- Style: Carpenter Gothic
- Established: (as a congregation)
- Completed: 1922
- Materials: Timber frame

Website
- thewoodbourneshul.com
- B'nai Israel Synagogue
- U.S. National Register of Historic Places
- Area: less than one acre
- NRHP reference No.: 98001620
- Added to NRHP: January 15, 1999

B'nai Israel Synagogue, more commonly called The Woodbourne Shul, is an Orthodox Jewish congregation and historic, popular synagogue, located at 457 NY State Route 52, in Woodbourne, New York, United States. The congregation follows the Ashkenazi rite.

== History ==
The first rabbi of the synagogue was David Isaac Godlin (1868–1943).

The synagogue was built in 1920 and is a two-story building above a shallow concrete basement. It is a wood-frame structure, three bays wide by four bays deep and surmounted by a steep gable roof with deep wooden cornice.

The synagogue building was added to the National Register of Historic Places in 1999.

== Modern times ==
In 2010, Rabbi Mordechai Jungreis, Rebbe of the Nikolsburg-Woodbourne Hasidic dynasty, purchased the synagogue building, then in decline, from the congregation board for $120,000. Jungreis also leads a congregation in the Borough Park neighborhood of Brooklyn. After completing necessary repairs, in the first year of acquisition, approximately 2,000 people attended the shul throughout the summer. By summer 2011, the number of attendees had tripled. In the 2014 summer, the shul had approximately 10,000 weekly attendees; and in the summer of 2015, approximately 120,000 people attended the shul; described by some as a Minyan factory, with minyanim commencing every ten minutes throughout the day, from early morning to past midnight.

The synagogue was initially used during the summer months, from Memorial Day to Labor Day, when Sullivan County sees a large influx of Jewish vacationers. After COVID more people began using the synagogue during the year and now it is currently open all year long.

== See also ==
- National Register of Historic Places listings in Sullivan County, New York
