= Anne Beloff-Chain =

English biochemist (1921–1991)

Anne Ethel Beloff-Chain, Lady Chain (26 June 1921 – 2 December 1991) was a British biochemist. She worked at the Istituto Superiore di Sanità (1948–1964), Imperial College London (1964–1986) and the University of Buckingham (1986–1991). Her research focused on carbohydrate metabolism and the hormones involved in diabetes and obesity.

== Early life ==
Anne Ethel Beloff was born in 1921 in Hampstead to Semion (Simon) Beloff (born Semion Rubinowicz) and Maria (Marie) Katzin. Her parents were Russian–Jewish émigrés. Her siblings include the historian Max Beloff, Baron Beloff, the psychologist John Beloff, the journalist Nora Beloff, and the politician Renee Soskin. Her paternal great-grandmother was Leah Horowitz-Winograd, the sister of Eliyahu Shlomo Horowitz-Winograd and a descendant of the Hasidic master, Shmelke Horowitz of Nikolsburg (1726–1778). She earned a degree in chemistry from University College London in 1942 before completing a PhD in the biochemistry of skin burns with Rudolph Peters at the University of Oxford. She visited Harvard Medical School in 1946 to perform research and returned to the UK in 1948. In the same year she married Ernst Boris Chain, a biochemist who had won the Nobel Prize in Physiology or Medicine in 1945, and moved with him to Rome.

== Career ==
Beloff-Chain worked at Italy's Istituto Superiore di Sanità (National Institute of Health) with Chain from 1948 to 1964, and held the position of chief research scientist. Her research focused on carbohydrate metabolism and the mechanism of action of insulin in hormonal control of diabetes and obesity. One of her most significant discoveries was that levels of beta-cell-tropin, an insulin secretagogue hormone, were elevated in the blood of obese individuals.

In 1964, Beloff-Chain and her husband were recruited by Imperial College London and her family returned to London, where she took up a biochemistry teaching post at Imperial College London. She was promoted to professor of biochemistry in 1983, but she decided to leave with her research team in 1985. A £250,000 new laboratory was built and she became a professor at the University of Buckingham in 1986. At Buckingham, she received funding from the Clore Foundation to establish and head the Department of Biochemistry, where she worked until her death.

== Death and legacy ==
Beloff-Chain died on 2 December 1991 in Camden Town, in northwest London. She is best remembered for her significant discovery that levels of beta-cell-tropin, an insulin secretagogue hormone, were elevated in the blood of obese individuals.
