= Renee Soskin =

Renee Soskin

Renee Rachel Soskin JP (née Beloff; 16 December 1916 – 8 July 1998) was a British teacher, company director and Liberal Party politician.

== Background ==
Soskin was daughter of merchant Semion (Simon) Beloff (born Semion Rubinowicz) and his wife Maria (Marie) Katzin, who were Russian Jews who had moved to England in 1903. She was one of five children. She was a younger sister to Max Beloff the historian and member of the House of Lords. She was older sister to John Beloff the psychologist. Her sister Anne later married German-born Nobel Prize–winning biochemist Ernst Boris Chain in 1948. Her paternal great-grandmother was Leah Horowitz-Winograd, the sister of Eliyahu Shlomo Horowitz-Winograd and a descendant of the Hasidic master, Shmelke Horowitz of Nikolsburg (1726–1778). She was educated at King Alfred School, London, and the Royal Academy of Music and trained for the stage. She married Moses G. Soskin.

== Professional career ==
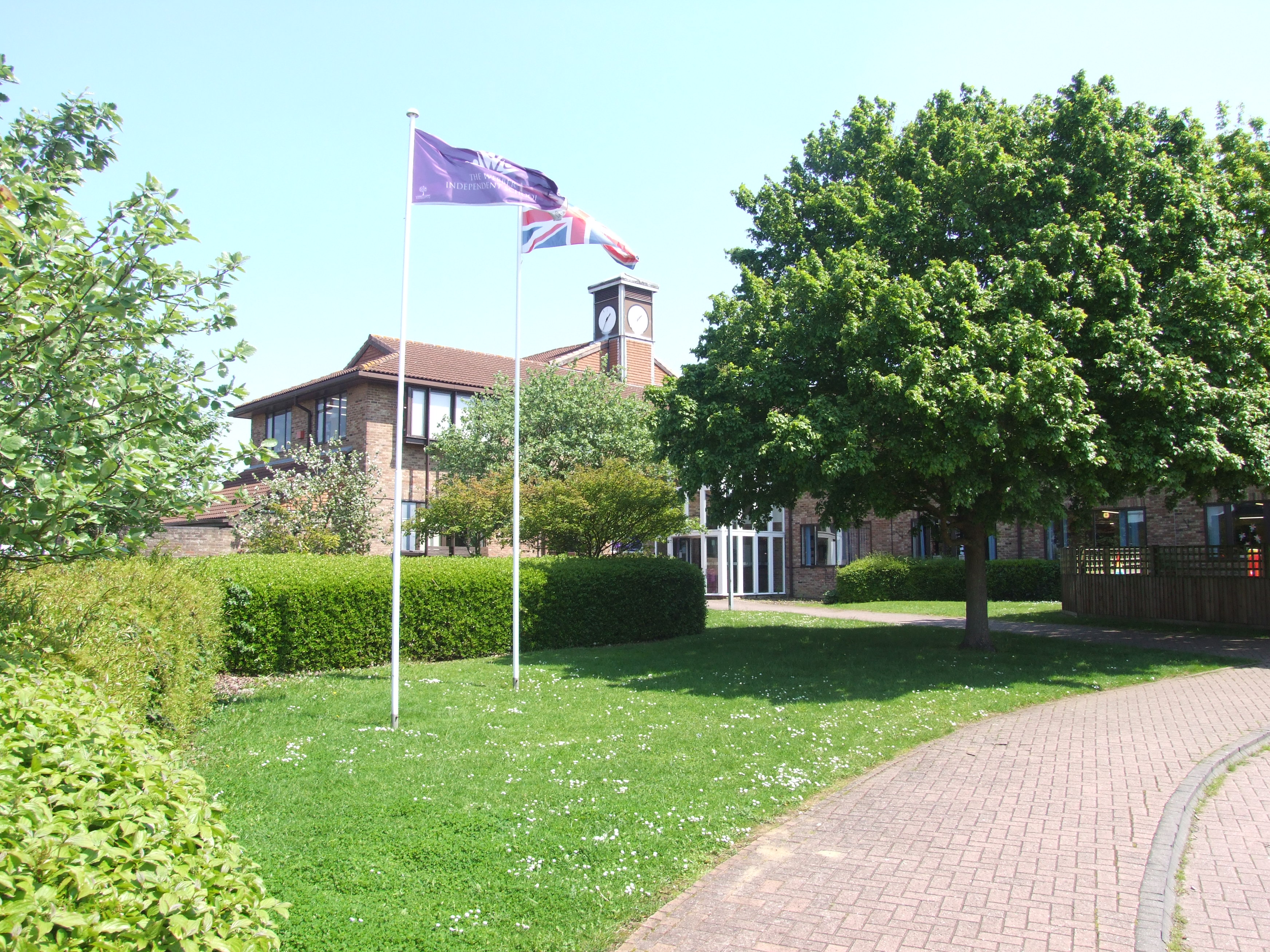
Webber School

She was a speech and drama teacher. She was a teacher of drama at the Royal Academy of Music. She was managing director of a City of London finance house. She became a Company Director of two companies. In 1970 she became the new proprietor of Bury Lawn Independent Day School a coeducational independent school first located in Newport Pagnell, then at The Knoll in Woburn Sands and ultimately at its present location in Milton Keynes. The school, now called the Webber independent school, is located in Soskin Drive, which was named after her.

== Political career ==
She was a County of London Magistrate. In 1953, 1956 and 1959 she was a Liberal candidate for Town ward in the Hampstead Metropolitan Borough Council elections. She was chairman of the Hampstead Liberal Association for four years. In 1958 she was first elected a Member of the Liberal Party Council. She was Liberal candidate for the Bedfordshire South division at the 1959 General Election. During the 1959 General election campaign she featured in a televised Liberal Party Election Broadcast. This additional exposure was not enough to help her win and she finished third. In 1961 she was elected vice-president of the Women's Liberal Federation, serving until 1963. In 1964 she was vice-chairman of the Women's Liberal Federation. She was Liberal candidate for the Hampstead division at the 1964 United Kingdom general election. She was Liberal candidate again for Hampstead at the 1966 general election. On both occasions she finished third.

=== Election results ===
General Election 1959: South Bedfordshire
Party	Candidate	Votes	%	±%
Conservative	Norman John Cole	25,861	47.1	
Labour	Walter Hamlet Johnson	21,102	38.5	
Liberal	Renee Rachel Soskin	7,912	14.4	
Majority		4,759	8.6	
Turnout		54,875	83.9	
Conservative hold		Swing		

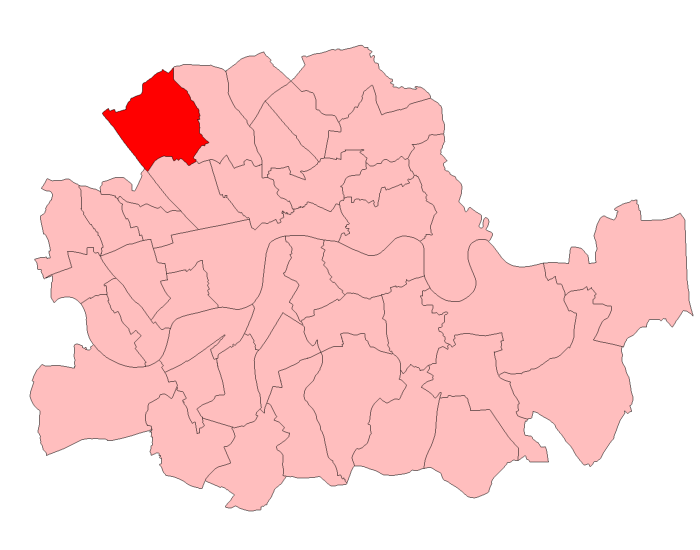
Hampstead

General Election 1964: Hampstead
Party	Candidate	Votes	%	±%
Conservative	Rt Hon. Henry Brooke	19,888	43.3	
Labour	John W T Cooper	18,053	39.3	
Liberal	Renee Rachel Soskin	8,019	17.4	
Majority		1,835	4.0	
Turnout		45,960	67.6	
Conservative hold		Swing		

General Election 1966: Hampstead
Party	Candidate	Votes	%	±%
Labour	Benjamin Charles George Whitaker	22,963	46.8	
Conservative	Rt Hon. Henry Brooke	20,710	42.2	
Liberal	Renee Rachel Soskin	5,182	10.7	
Socialist (GB)	Harry Baldwin	211	0.4	
Majority		2,253	4.6	
Turnout		49,066	72.4	
Labour gain from Conservative		Swing		
