= Woodbourne Reformed Church Complex =

Historic church in New York, United States

- U.S. National Register of Historic Places
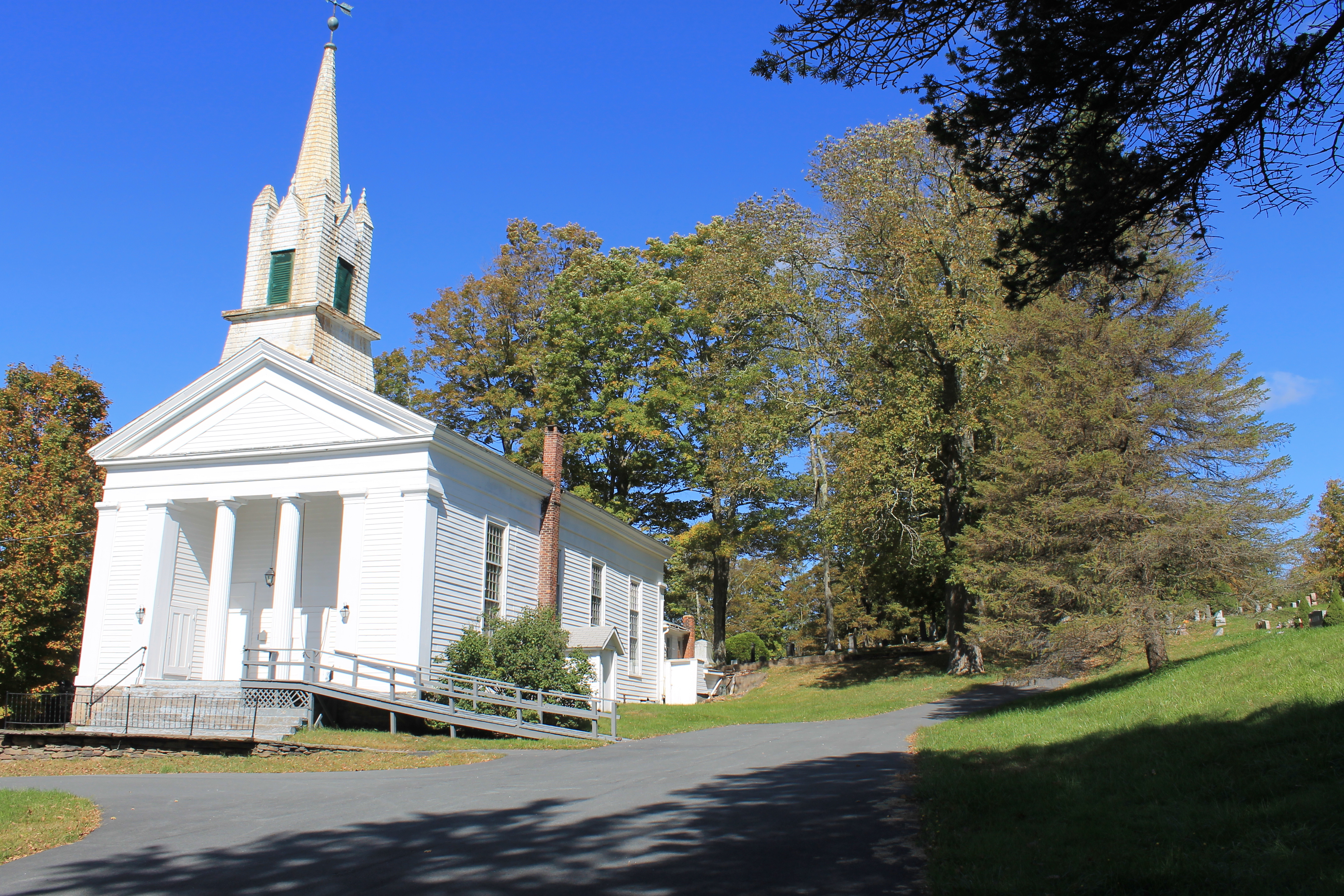

- Location within New York Location within the United States
- Location: NY 42, Woodbourne, New York
- Coordinates: 41°45′42″N 74°36′0″W
- Area: 4 acres (1.6 ha)
- Built: 1837
- Architectural style: Greek Revival
- NRHP reference No.: 03001120
- Added to NRHP: November 7, 2003

Woodbourne Reformed Church Complex is a historic Dutch Reformed church complex on NY 42 in Woodbourne, Sullivan County, New York. The complex consists of a church, chapel, and cemetery. The church was built in 1837 and enlarged in 1848. It is of heavy timber frame construction with clapboard siding. It started as a small frame meeting house, with a later 18 foot addition. The addition included the Greek Revival, temple form facade featuring Doric order columns and two stage bell tower with tall spire. The current tower dates to 1893. Also on the property is a chapel, built in 1849 as a public school and purchased by the church in 1891, and a cemetery.

It was added to the National Register of Historic Places in 2003.
