= Center Theatre (Woodbourne, New York) =

- U.S. National Register of Historic Places
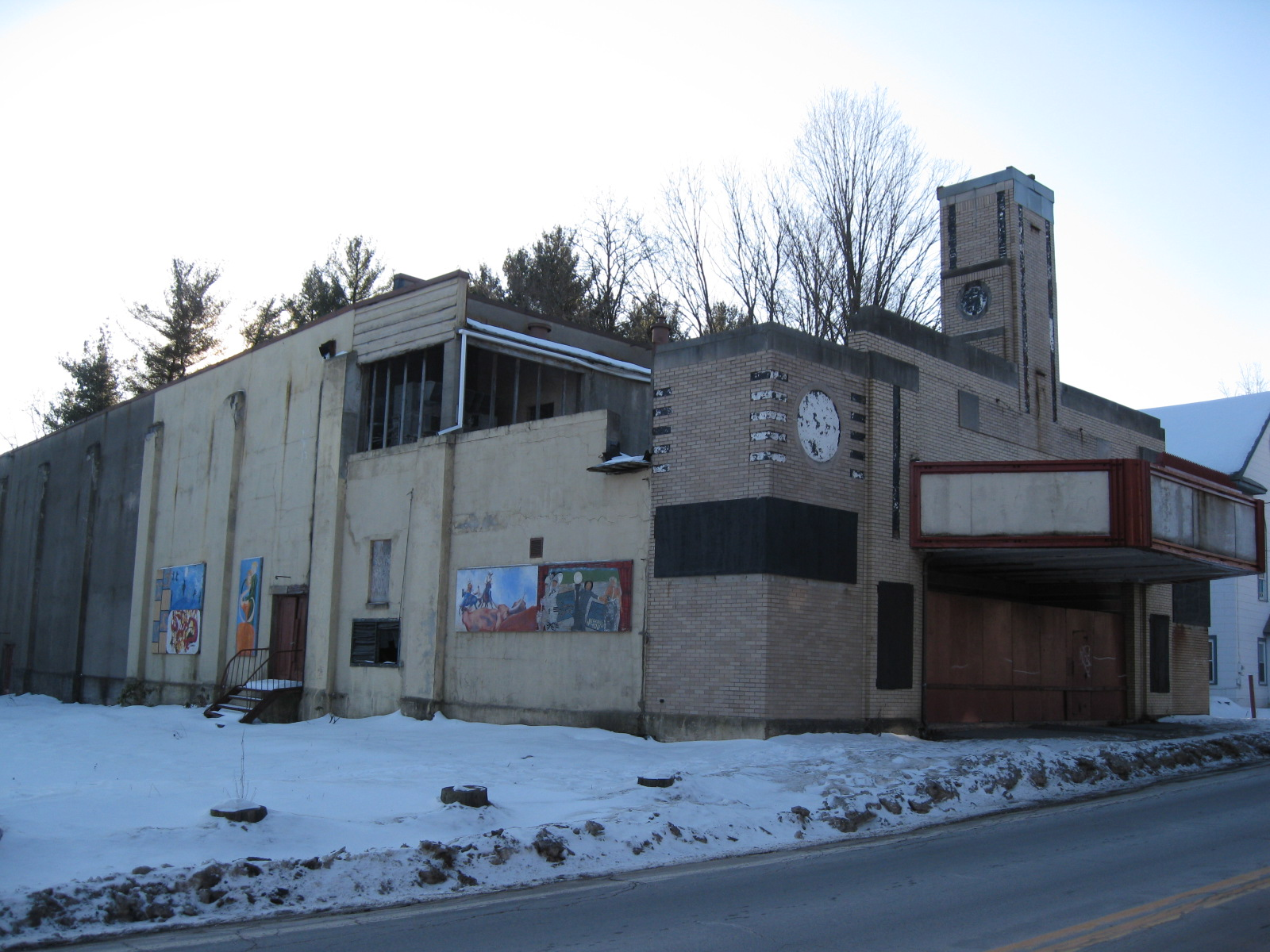
- Center Theatre, December 2009

- Location within New York Location within the United States
- Location: NY 52, Woodbourne, New York
- Coordinates: 41°45′30″N 74°36′8″W
- Area: less than one acre
- Built: 1938
- Architect: Okun, Abraham H.; Sacks, Jacob Bernard
- Architectural style: Art Deco
- NRHP reference No.: 01000170
- Added to NRHP: February 23, 2001

Center Theatre, also known as the Woodbourne Theater, is a historic theatre located at Woodbourne in Sullivan County, New York. It was built in 1938 and is a three bays wide, two stories tall Art Deco structure. It is three time longer than it is wide and has a large auditorium behind the entrance pavilion. The entrance pavilion consists of the facade, foyer, and lobby.

It was added to the National Register of Historic Places in 2001.
