= Woodbourne, New York =

- Hamlet and CDP
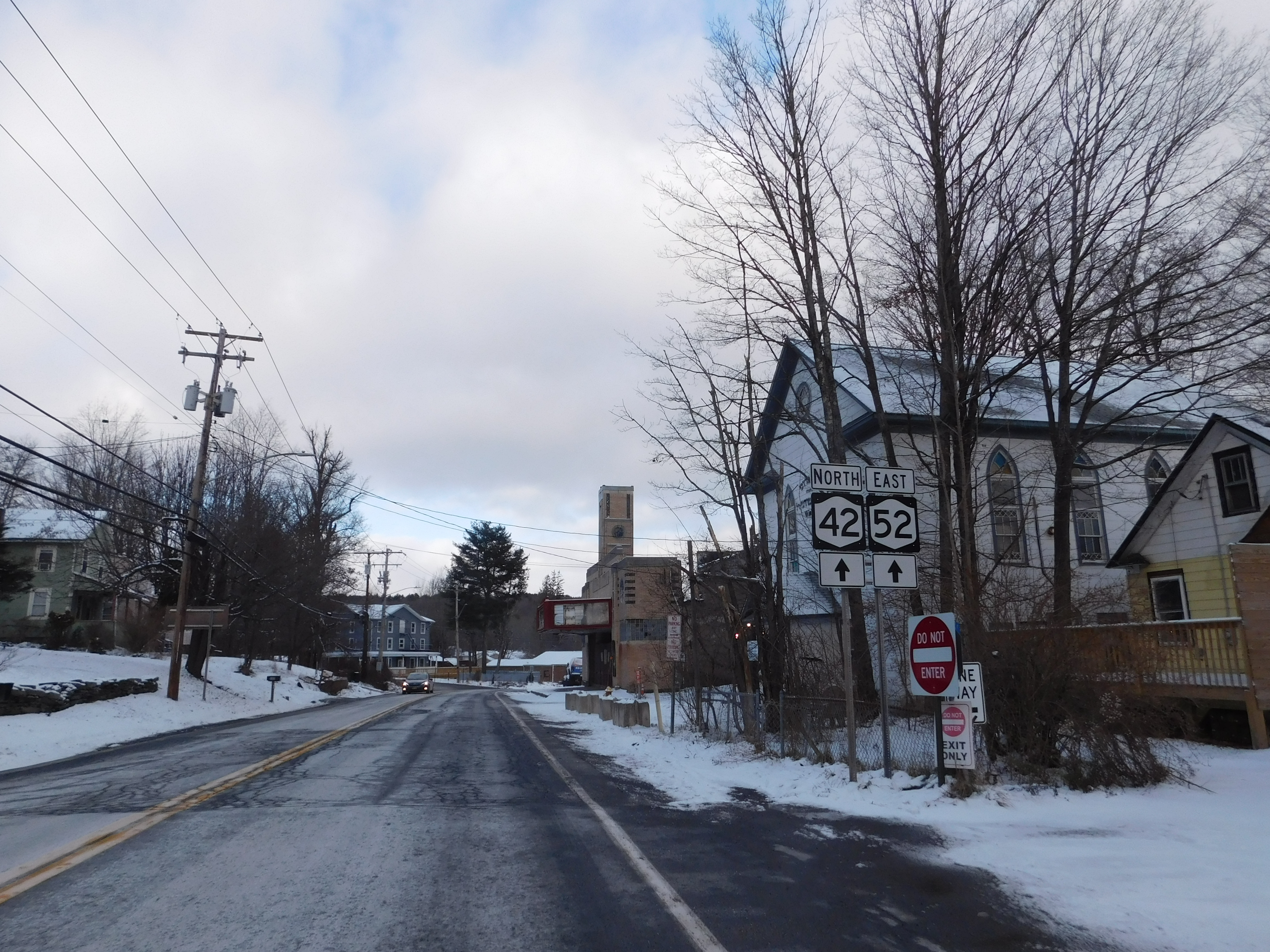
- NY 42 and NY 52 entering Woodbourne. The Center Theatre is on the right.

- Location within the state of New York
- Coordinates: 41°46′N 74°36′W
- Country: United States
- State: New York
- County: Sullivan

Population (2020)
  - Total: 411
- Time zone: UTC-5 (Eastern (EST))
  - Summer (DST): UTC-4 (EDT)
- ZIP codes: 12788
- FIPS code: 32/82733
- GNIS feature ID: 971607

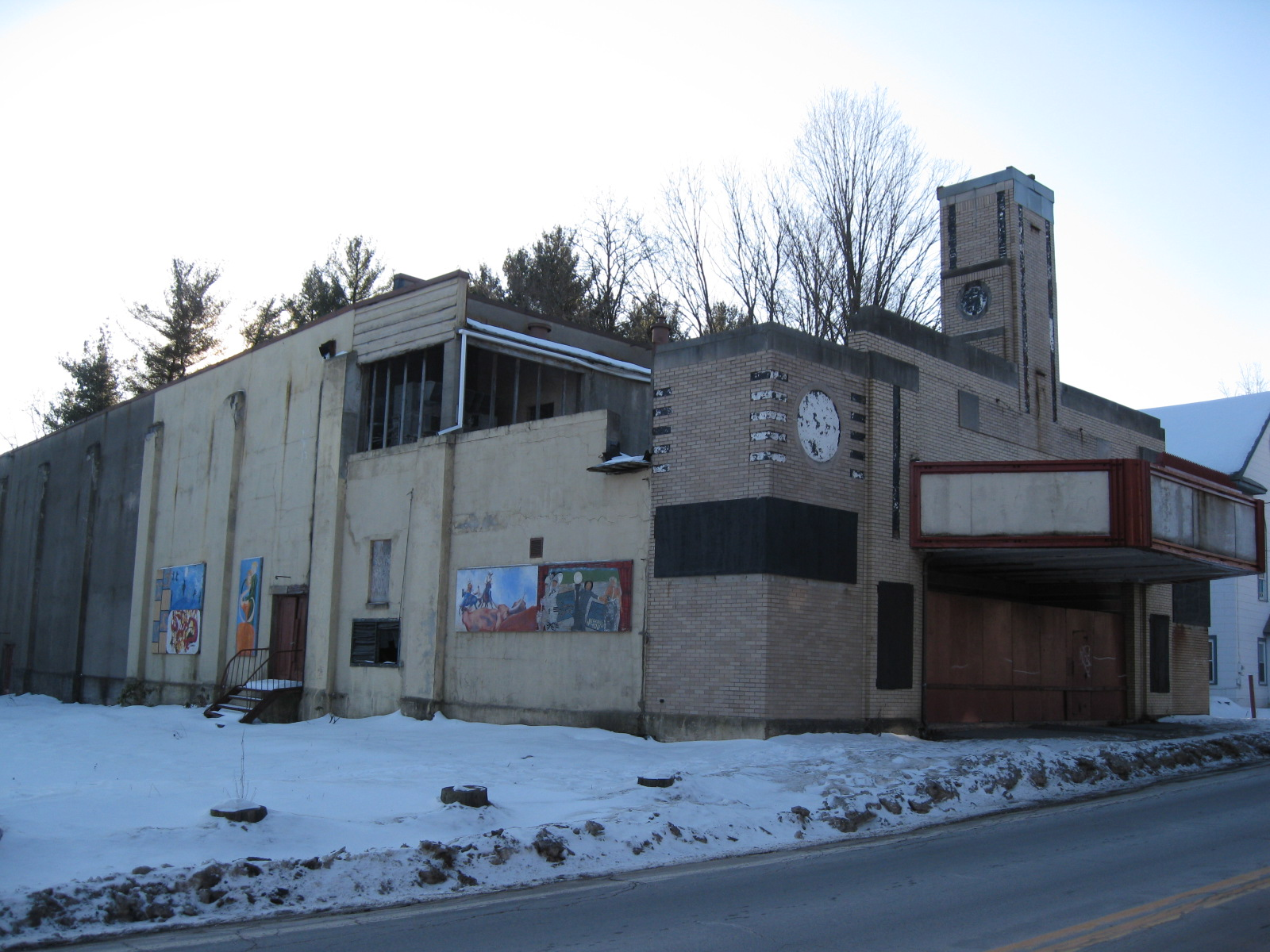
The Center Theatre in Woodbourne, New York

Woodbourne is a hamlet (and census-designated place) in the town of Fallsburg in Sullivan County, New York, United States. As of the 2020 census, Woodbourne had a population of 411.

Woodbourne is bordered by the town of Neversink, the hamlet of Grahamsville, the hamlet of Loch Sheldrake, the hamlet of Old Falls and the hamlet of Hasbrouck. The major thoroughfares of Woodbourne are New York State Routes 42 and 52. The center of the hamlet is where the two highways briefly overlap and cross the Neversink River.

Woodbourne is in the Catskills Borscht Belt and in its heyday was home to many summer hotels, bungalow colonies and boarding houses, which are mainly uninhabited throughout most of the calendar year. To this day, the population of Woodbourne and nearby areas increases dramatically each summer with an influx of Orthodox Jewish residents from New York City, New Jersey and other surrounding Jewish population centers. With this, the local economy expands in the warmer months as locally owned small businesses thrive until approximately Labor Day Weekend, marking the typical end of summer.

== Early history ==
According to the Sullivan County Historical Society, the northern part of the town of Fallsburg was settled by Europeans in the 1780s, many of whom migrated from Ulster County in search of cheap, fertile land. In 1830, a man named Gabriel Ludlum (or Ludlam) relocated his law practice from the nearby hamlet of Hasbrouck, and named the area Woodbourne. Some time after 1831, Mr. Austin Strong, in partnership with Medad T. Morss would establish a tannery, which burnt down in 1866. Woodbourne benefited from being the closest settlement in Sullivan County to Ellenville, which was located along the Delaware & Hudson Canal. The decline of the tanning industry, which resulted from the decline in the hemlock forests in Sullivan county, and the arrival of the New York, Ontario and Western Railway in the early 1870s led to a decline in Woodbourne's importance, as the railway became the main driver of commerce in the region.

== Landmarks and places of interest ==
- B'nai Israel Synagogue
- Center Theatre, added to the National Register of Historic Places in 2001.
- Church of the Immaculate Conception
- Neversink River, which flows through the town.
- Woodbourne Correctional Facility
- Woodbourne Reformed Church Complex, added to the National Register of Historic Places in 2003.
