= John Beloff =

British psychologist and author

- Beloff (right) and Halla in 1953
- Born: 19 April 1920; London, England
- Died: 1 June 2006 (aged 86)
- Occupations: Parapsychologist, psychologist
- Spouse: Halla Parker (m. 1952)
- Children: 2
- Relatives: Max Beloff, Baron Beloff (brother); Renee Soskin (sister); Anne Beloff-Chain (sister); Nora Beloff (sister)

John Beloff (19 April 1920 – 1 June 2006) was an English psychology professor at Edinburgh University and parapsychologist.

== Biography ==
Beloff was born and brought up in London, and was from a Russian Jewish family. His parents were Semion (Simon) Beloff (born Semion Rubinowicz) and Maria (Marie) Katzin. His paternal great-grandmother was Leah Horowitz-Winograd, the sister of Eliyahu Shlomo Horowitz-Winograd and a descendant of the Hasidic master Shmelke Horowitz of Nikolsburg (1726–1778). He was the brother of the historian Max Beloff, the politician and educationalist Renee Soskin, the biochemist Anne Beloff-Chain, and the journalist Nora Beloff. He served in the British Army in the Second World War. He worked in an architect's office, then studied at London University, where he graduated in 1952. Shortly after graduation he married Halla Parker, a fellow student of psychology who was ten years younger. Together, they spent a year at the University of Illinois, and then enrolled on a doctorate programme at Queen's University Belfast, defending their PhDs in 1956. In 1962 they both were offered jobs at the same department of University of Edinburgh and worked there until retirement. John and Halla had a daughter Zoe, who became an international artist.

Beloff had been interested in parapsychology from an early age and served as president of the Society for Psychical Research from 1974 to 1976. He was an executor of Arthur Koestler's will in 1983 and was instrumental in setting up the first UK chair of parapsychology, the Koestler Parapsychology Unit at Edinburgh in 1985.

== Reception ==
Beloff's belief in paranormal powers and parapsychological statements were heavily criticized by psychologist Nicholas Humphrey for being based on wishful thinking.

Science writer Martin Gardner dismissed Beloff as credulous and willing to believe. Beloff had endorsed some fraudulent mediums such as Helen Duncan. Gardner quoted Beloff as admitting "my own ignorance of conjuring techniques may have misled me", but Gardner noted despite this, he still went on believing. Beloff had endorsed levitations, psychic surgery, the "thoughtographs" of Ted Serios and various spiritualist mediums as genuine evidence for the paranormal.

Beloff favoured mind-body dualism. This view was criticized by Margaret Boden a professor of cognitive science in a detailed review.

== Publications ==
- The Existence of Mind (1964)
- Psychological Sciences (1973)
- Parapsychology: The Way Ahead (1974)
- The Importance of Psychical Research (1988)
- The Case for Dualism (1989)
- The Relentless Question: Reflections on the Paranormal (1990)
- Parapsychology: A Concise History (1997)
