= Linsk (Hasidic dynasty) =

Polish Hasidic dynasty

Linsk (Yiddish: לינסק Linsk) is the name of a Hasidic dynasty—a family of Hasidic leaders or rebbes and the group of their associated followers or chassidim—founded by Rabbi Avraham Chaim Horowitz of Linsk (c. 1789 or c. 1792 – 1831). Linsk is the Yiddish name of the town of Lesko in southern Poland.

The Linsk dynasty is a branch of the Ropshitz dynasty. The Rabbi of the Linsk dynasty is known, among other things, for having worn a mask on his eyes while walking in Israel's Ben-Gurion Airport, in order to avoid seeing "indecent" women.

== Lineage ==
- Rebbe Menachem Mendel Rubin of Linsk (c. 1740 – 1803), the rabbi of Linsk (Lesko). His father, Rabbi Yaakov, was the rabbi of Linsk before him.
  - Rebbe Naftali Tzvi Horowitz of Ropshitz (Ropczyce), son of Rebbe Mendel and his successor to the rabbinate of Linsk in addition to being the rabbi of Ropshitz.
    - Rebbe Avraham Chaim Horowitz of Linsk (c. 1789 or c. 1792 – 1831), son of Rebbe Naftali Tzvi. His wife was the daughter of his uncle Rabbi Shmelke, rabbi of Roman and Bar, son of Rabbi Mendel of Linsk. Rebbe Sholom Rokeach of Belz held him in high esteem. He was briefly the rabbi of Linsk after his father, but a few years later.

== Dynasty ==
- Rebbe Menachem Mendel Horowitz of Linsk (died 1868), son of Rebbe Avraham Chaim
  - Rebbe Avraham Chaim Horowitz (the second) of Linsk (c. 1832 or c. 1834 – 1904), son of Rebbe Menachem Mendel. He married Miriam Yocheved, daughter of Rebbe Berish Beer of Litovisk (Lutowiska) of the Istrik–Litovisk dynasty. He was a disciple of Rebbe Sholom Rokeach of the Belz dynasty.
    - Rebbe Meir Horowitz of Linsk (c. 1843 – 1924 (Note: Vunder gives another date, 1923 [as in ha-Ḥasidut mi-dor le-dor], which he retracts.)), son of Rebbe Avraham Chaim. He succeeded his father as the rabbi of Linsk. He married Hinda, daughter of Rabbi Naftali Tzvi Horowitz, (Note: Called Parnes in some sources) step-son of Rebbe Chaim Halberstam of Sanz. (Note: Alternatively: daughter of Rebbe Naftali Tzvi Parnes and step-daughter of Rebbe Chaim Halberstam of Sanz.)
      - Rebbe Menachem Mendel Horowitz (the second) of Linsk (died 1942), son of Rebbe Meir. He married Chaya, daughter of Rebbe Avraham Shalom Halberstam of Stropkov. He was the last rebbe of Linsk. He was killed in the Holocaust in the Zasław concentration camp, as was his family.
      - Rebbe Yaakov Horowitz of Linsk (died 1942), son of Rebbe Meir. (Note: Alfasi and Vunder have him as the son of his grandfather, Rebbe Avraham Chaim. Vunder later corrects this, citing family traditions.) He married Eidel, daughter of Rebbe Elimelech Rubin of Yavrov of the Ropshitz dynasty (from his second marriage). He was a dayan in Linsk, later a rabbi and rebbe there, and died in the Holocaust.
        - Rebbe Elimelech Horowitz (1911–1995), Yavrover (also called Yaritshover) Rebbe of New York, son of Rebbe Yaakov. He married Rivka Hena, daughter of Rebbe Alter Eichenstein of Yaritshov (Jarczów) of the Zidichov dynasty. After the Holocaust, he settled in New York: first in the East Side, Manhattan, then in Borough Park, Brooklyn. His son, Rabbi Yaakov (Shraga Feivish), is the rabbi of the Telz congregation of Borough Park and the Rosh Yeshiva and founder of Yeshivas Beis Meir, named for his grandfather, Rebbe Meir of Linsk.
  - Rabbi Yisrael (Note: Alfasi mentions him once as "Yisrael David"; otherwise, and in other sources, he is called "Yisrael" only.) Horowitz of Veislitz (Wiślica), son of Rebbe Menachem Mendel. He married the daughter of Rebbe Moshe Aba Beer of Litovisk of the Istrik–Litovisk dynasty. He was a disciple of Rebbe Chaim Halberstam of Sanz. He officiated as the rabbi of Veislitz.
    - Rebbe Naftali Tzvi Horowitz of Veislitz, son of Rebbe Yisrael (died 1928). He was the first rebbe in Toronto. An ohel was erected over his grave.
    - Rebbe Yaakov Horowitz of Pietrikov (Piotrków Trybunalski), son of Rebbe Yisrael. He married the daughter of Rebbe Meir Menachem Finkler of Pietrikov of the Radoshitz dynasty. He died in the Holocaust.
