= Zevi Joshua Horowitz =

Moravian Hasidic (1760 - 1816)

Zevi Joshua HaLevi Horowitz (1760–1816) also known as the Ribash (ריב"ש, Rabbi Joshua ben Shmuel) was the son of Shmuel Shmelke Horowitz of Nikolsburg and a prominent Moravian Hasidic figure.

== Biography ==
Born in Nikolsburg, Moravia around 1760. In his early years he and his brother, Jakob Horowitz studied under their father. After his studies, Zevi Joshua married the daughter of his uncle Pinchas Horowitz. From 1781 to 1786, Zevi Joshua was the Chief Rabbi Jamnitz, later moving to Trebic, where he served as Chief Rabbi from 1786 to 1800. In 1811, he moved to Prossnitz, where he served as Chief rabbi up until his death in 1816. He is best known for his novellae "Hiddushei ha-Ribash" which appeared posthumously in 1878. He also wrote "Semikhat Moshe" which was published as an appendix to his father's work "Nezir ha-Shem".
