= Pinchas Horowitz =

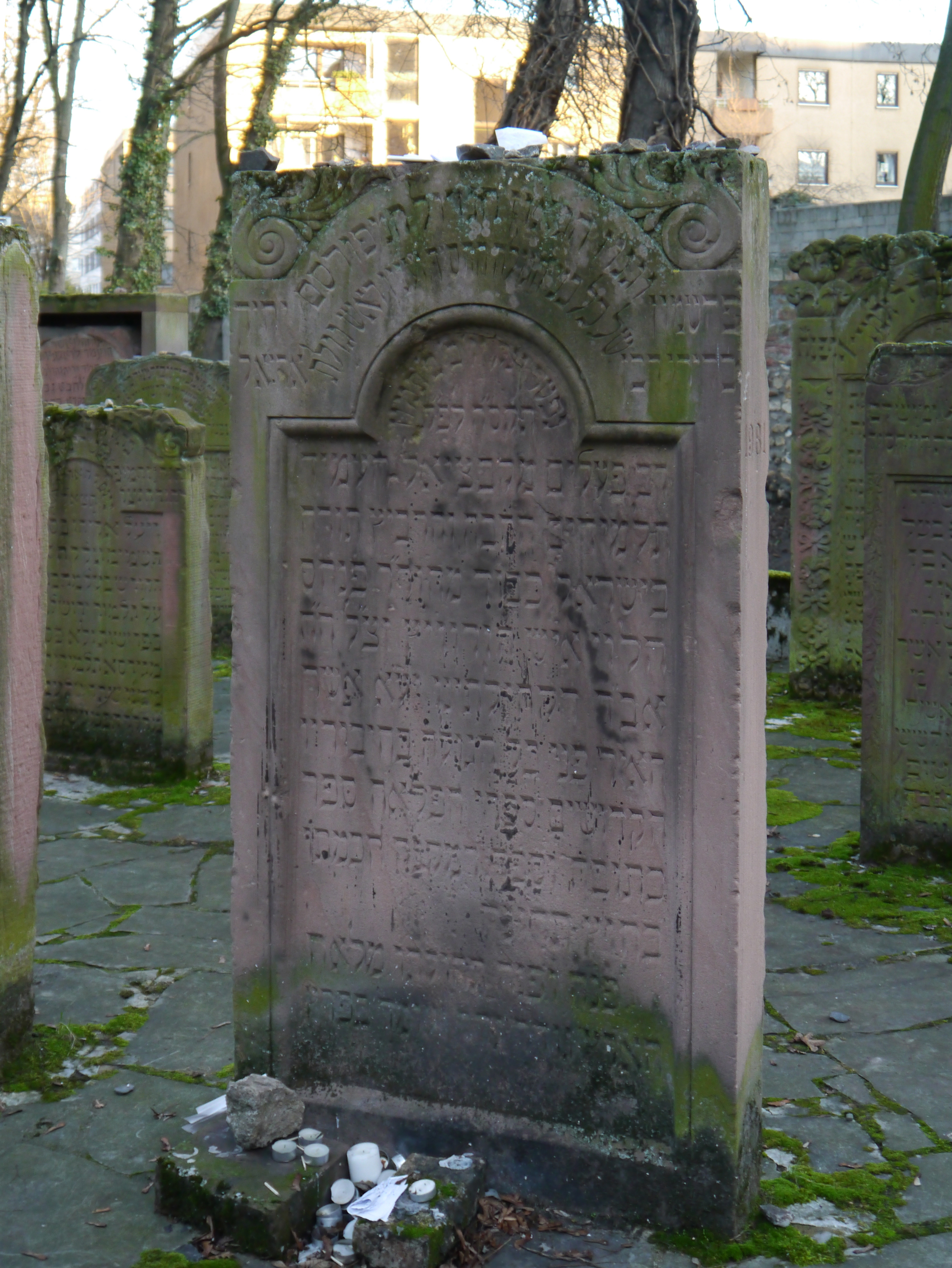
- The tombstone of Horowitz at the Old Jewish Cemetery on Battonnstrasse, Frankfurt am Main
- Title: Rabbi Pinchas HaLevi Horowitz

Personal life
- Born: 1731 Chortkiv, Galicia, Polish–Lithuanian Commonwealth
- Died: July 1, 1805 (aged 73–74) Frankfurt, Holy Roman Empire
- Buried: Frankfurt a.M.
- Parent: Rabbi Zvi Hirsch Horowitz (father)

Senior posting
- Main work: Hafla'ah

Rabbi Pinchas HaLevi Horowitz (c. 1731 – July 1, 1805), also known as the Baal Hafla'ah, was a rabbi and Talmudist.

== Life ==
The descendant of a long line of rabbinical ancestors and the son of Rabbi Zvi Hirsch Horowitz of Chortkiv, he received a thorough Talmudic education, chiefly from his older brother, Rabbi Shmelke of Nikolsburg, together with whom he was a follower of Rabbi Dov Ber of Mezeritch, the Maggid of Mezeritch. He married at an early age the daughter of the wealthy Joel Heilpern, who provided for him and permitted him to occupy himself exclusively with his studies. Adverse circumstances then forced him to accept a rabbinical position, and he became rabbi of Witkowo, from which place he was called later on to Lachovice.

He was involved in the controversial Get of Cleves case and wrote a responsum to validate the divorce. However, according to tradition, before he was able to publish the responsum, his ink bottle spilled over the paper. His students convinced him that enough rabbis had written on this case and it was not necessary to rewrite it. Rabbi Avraham Abish, then the Rabbi of Frankfurt, had fought to invalidate the divorce; in response, when he died in 1769 the rabbinical court in Frankfurt vowed not to hire for the position of Chief Rabbi anyone who had written a responsum validating the divorce. Since Rabbi Horowitz's responsum had never been published he was able to become the rabbi in the very prestigious community.

Although a kabbalist, he disagreed with Rabbi Nathan Adler, who held separate services in his house according to the cabalistic ritual. When Moses Mendelssohn's Biur on Pentateuch appeared, Horowitz denounced it in unmeasured terms, admonishing his hearers to shun the work as unclean, and approving the action of those persons who had publicly burned it in Vilna (1782). Following the same principle, he opposed the establishment of a secular school in 1794. His daughter married his nephew Zevi Joshua Horowitz.

Horowitz was succeeded, as chief Rabbi of Frankfurt, by his son Tzvi Hirsch Horowitz, author of Macheneh Levi on the Torah.

== Works ==
Horowitz's chief work is "Hafla'ah," novellae on the tractate Ketubot, with an appendix, Kuntres Aharon, or Shevet Achim. The second part, containing novellae on the tractate Kiddushin, also with an appendix, appeared under the title Sefer haMakneh, in 1800. Other-works are: Nesivos laShavet (glosses on sections 1-24 of the Shulchan Aruch, Even HaEzer), Lemberg, 1837; Giv'as Pinchas, a collection of 84 responsa, in 1837; and "Panim Yafos," a kabbalistic commentary on the Pentateuch, printed with the Pentateuch, Ostroh, 1824 (separate ed. 1851, n.p.).

Rabbi Horowitz was one of the last pilpulists in Germany, and he therefore represents the developed stage of rabbinical dialectics. It was in keeping with these views that he opposed even the slightest change of the traditional form of public worship.
