= Nikolsburg (Hasidic dynasty) =

Moravian Hasidic dynasty

Nikolsburg Hasidic Dynasty
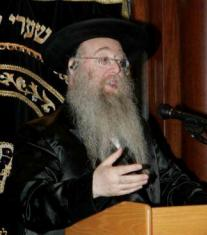
- The Nikolsburger Rebbe of Monsey

Founder
- Shmelke of Nikolsburg

Regions with significant populations
- Czech Republic, United States, Israel

Religions
- Hasidic Judaism

Languages
- Hebrew, Yiddish

Website
- nikolsburg.org
- Current headquarters in Monsey, New York

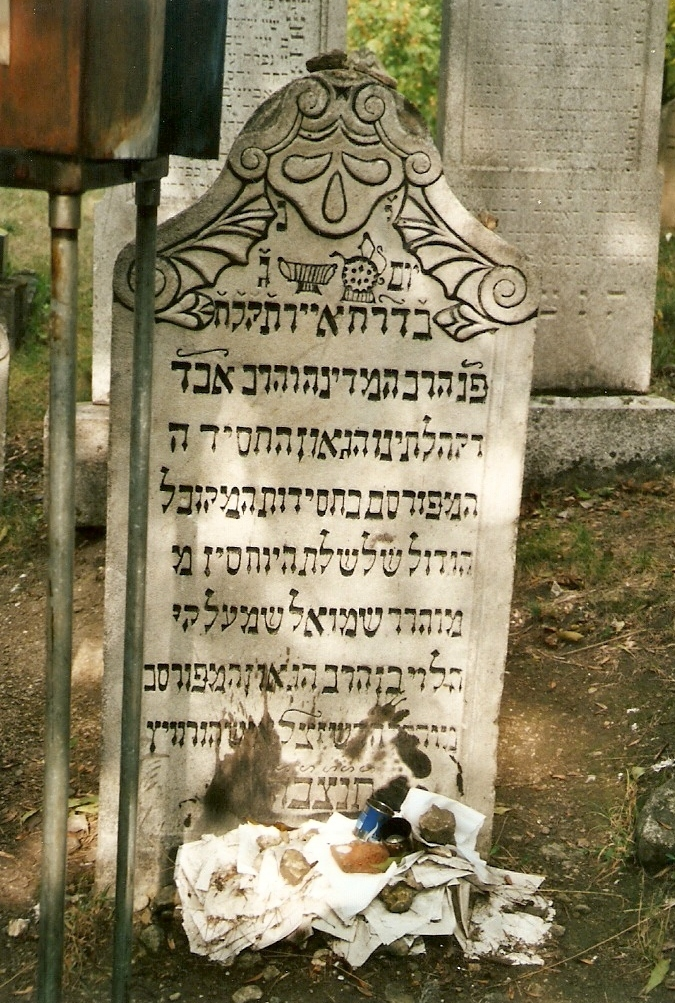
Grave of Shmelke of Nikolsburg

Nikolsburg (Yiddish: ניקאלשפורג) is the name of a Hasidic dynasty descending from Shmelke of Nikolsburg, a disciple of Dov Ber of Mezeritch. From 1773 to 1778 he was the Chief Rabbi of Moravia, in the city of Nikolsburg, today Mikulov, Czech Republic, from which the dynasty gets its name.

== Nikolsburg lineage ==
=== Boston and Lelov ===
- Shmuel Shmelke ha-Levi Horowitz (1726–1778), Chief Rabbi of Nikolsburg.
  - Zevi Joshua Horowitz (1754–1816), Chief Rabbi of Jamnitz, Trebitsch, and Prossnitz. Son-in-law of his uncle Pinchas Horowitz.
    - Yaakov Dovid Horowitz (died 1855)
      - Noach Pinchas Horowitz (died 1875), Chief Rabbi of Magierov.
        - Alexsander Yitzchak Horowitz (1826–1886).
          - Shmuel Shmelke Horowitz (1860–1898), rabbi in Jerusalem.
            - Pinchas David Horowitz (1876–1941), Founder of the Boston Hasidic dynasty.
        - David Tzvi Shlomo Biderman (1844–1918), Fourth rebbe of Lelov. Son-in-law of Noach Pinchas Horowitz. His great-grandson Pinchas Yitzchak Biderman (b. 1940), is the rebbe of Lelov-Nikolsburg.

=== Nikolsburg-Monsey ===
- Baruch'l Schnitzler (died 1822), rabbi in Kaliv. Son-in-law of Zevi Joshua Horowitz.
  - Yoel Schnitzler (died 1865), Chief Rabbi of Kotaj.
    - Baruch Yehuda Schnitzler (1845–1894), Chief Rabbi of Derecske.
      - Shragei Shmuel Shmelke Schnitzler (1889–1979), the Tchabe Rav.
        - Baruch Yehuda Lebovitch (1909–1951), religious judge of Kish. Son-in-law of Shragei Shmuel Shmelke Schnitzler.
          - Yosef Yechiel Mechel Lebovits, rebbe of the Nikolsburg community in Monsey.

== Mordechai Zev Jungreis ==
Mordechai Zev Jungreis, a descendant of Mordecai Benet is also known as the Nikolsburger rebbe and is the rabbi of the B'nai Israel Synagogue in Woodbourne, New York.
