= Shmelke of Nikolsburg =

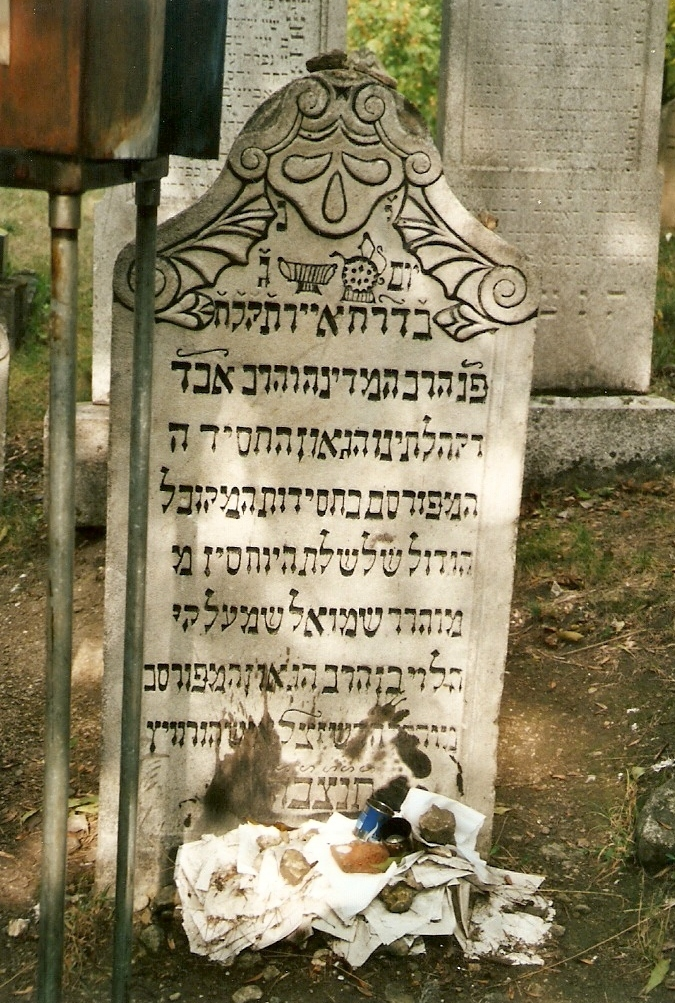
- The tombstone of Shmuel Shmelke HaLevi in Nikolsburg
- Title: The Rebbe Reb Shmelke

Personal life
- Born: Shmuel Shmelke Horowitz; 1726 Chortkiv, Poland-Lithuania (now Ukraine)
- Died: April 28, 1778 (aged 51–52) Nikolsburg, Moravia, Habsburg monarchy (now Czech Republic)
- Buried: Nikolsburg, Moravia
- Spouse: Shaindel Rabinowitz
- Children: Jacob Horowitz, Zevi Joshua Horowitz, Toiba Horowitz
- Parent: Zvi Hirsch Horowitz (father)
- Dynasty: Nikolsburg, Boston

Religious life
- Religion: Judaism

Jewish leader
- Predecessor: Dov Ber of Mezeritch
- Successor: Yaakov Yitzchak of Lublin, Menachem Mendel of Rimanov, Yisroel Hopsztajn, Mordecai Benet, Moshe Leib of Sassov
- Main work: Divre Shmuel
- Dynasty: Nikolsburg, Boston

Shmuel Shmelke HaLevi Horowitz of Nikolsburg (Yiddish: שמואל שמעלקי הלוי הורוויץ פון ניקאלשבורג, [ˈʃmɛlkɛ ˈfʊn ˈnɪkɛlʃbʊʁɡ]; 1726 – April 28, 1778) also known as the Rebbe Reb Shmelke was an early Hasidic master and kabbalist, who is amongst the most important figures of early Polish Hasidism. A leading disciple of Dov Ber of Mezeritch, he held rabbinic positions in Rychwal and Sieniawa, where he successfully introduced Hasidic Judaism to the region. From 1773 to 1778, he served as the Chief Rabbi of Moravia, basing himself in the town of Nikolsburg (Mikulov), where he introduced Hasidic philosophy to the chagrin of the city's conservative Misnagdic population. Despite efforts to depose him from his office, he was nevertheless mostly successful in introducing Hasidic Judaism to Moravia. He is the progenitor of the Nikolsburg Hasidic dynasties which includes Boston Hasidism.

== Rabbinic career in Poland ==
Shmuel Shmelke Horowitz was born in Czortków (now Ukraine) and was the oldest son of Zvi Hirsch HaLevi Horowitz, who had served as the town's Av Beit Din. Reb Shmelke's younger brother, Pinchas HaLevi Horowitz was also a notable Hasidic figure. The Horowitz family, claimed paternal descent from the Prophet Samuel who Reb Shmelke always felt an affinity to. In his early years he and his brother were sent to learn at the Yeshiva of the Vilna Gaon, however under the influence of Abraham Kalisker, the two brothers left Vilna (Vilnius) to become disciples of Dov Ber of Mezeritch whom they studied under for several years. Following this he married Sheindel Rabinowitz, the daughter of the wealthy Hasid Joshua Rabinowitz who supported Reb Shmelke to learn for several years.

In 1754, Reb Shmelke was appointed the Chief Rabbi of Rychwal. He held this position for some time, during which several young Hassidim came to study with him from surrounding areas, the most notable of which being Yaakov Yitzchak of Lublin, Levi Yitzchok of Berditchev and Yisroel Hopstein. In 1762, he authored his magnum opus, Divrei Shmuel which contained homiletic and kabbalistic commentaries on the Talmudic tractates Bava Batra and Orach Chayyim.

In 1766, he became the Chief Rabbi of Sieniawa, where he was followed by his main disciple Yaakov Yitzchak. In 1769, he authored his second work Nezir HaShem which included novellae on the Shulhan Arukh. Although a strong proponent of Hasidic mysticism and Kabbalah, he was sceptical about some of the more outlandishly mystical tendencies of the Baal Shem Tov and his disciple Dov Ber. This attitude would later become a foundational belief of Polish Hasidism. In 1772, Reb Shmelke participated in the "Brody controversy", in which he petitioned that the rabbis of Brody to refrain from imposing a harsh ban on Hasidism in the city.

== Rabbinic career in Moravia ==
In 1773, after being invited to give a drasha in Nikolsburg, a small town on Moravian-Austrian border, he was offered the position of Chief Rabbi of Moravia at the request of Empress Maria Theresa and the Nikolsburg Jewish community. He accepted this position, and soon after established a Hasidic Yeshiva in Nikolsburg. which had among its students, Menachem Mendel of Rimanov, Mordecai Benet and Moshe Leib of Sassov. Abraham Trebitsch reported that on his first day as Chief Rabbi, Reb Shmelke began performing miracles, the most notable of which was bringing rain to Nikolsburg during a dry season. Immediately after his appointment, Reb Shmelke began to address several logistical problems the community faced. These communal issues occupied the vast majority of his time, leaving him with little time to learn and study. It was known that because of this, Reb Shmelke would stay up late into the night learning. Reb Shmelke once related that the Prophet Elijah had come to him in the form of the city's lamplighter who would stay up late into night to light Reb Shmelke's candle so that he could learn.

Mid-way through his rabbinic carrier, Reb Shmelke became involved in a heated dispute with a wealthy and influential Jew of the town who began to rally people against him. Additionally, as Reb Shmelke's Hasidic Yeshiva began to grow, many members of the community became growingly uncomfortable with the rising Hasidic population and the seemingly strange new customs that came along with it. The community finally went into turmoil after Reb Shmelke criticized and disallowed the Haskalah which had become relatively popular in Nikolsburg. Prominent community members suggested that Reb Shmelke return to Poland, as he was unfit for a modern and secularized community such as Nikolsburg. The community called in the local magistrate, asking him to depose Reb Shmelke. The magistrate responded, stating that he knew for a fact that Reb Shmelke was a pious man, as he often saw the Prophet Elijah lighting his candle and learning with him. Despite this, the community remained unconvinced and as a last resort, Reb Shmelke asked Elimelech of Lizhensk to come to Nikolsburg and convince the townsmen not to depose him. Reb Elimelech agreed, and when he arrived in Nikolsburg, he asked that the entire community come and hear his sermon. Expecting to be lectured by a Hasidic fanatic, the community begrudgingly joined Reb Elimelech in the local synagogue. However, instead of lecturing them, Reb Elimelech praised them on their modernity and enlightened secularization. Before he finished his sermon, he told the community he had a crucial time restraint, but that he would continue his sermon the next day. Thrilled to find a rabbi who embraced their beliefs, the community once again assembled in the local synagogue to hear Reb Elimelech speak. However, on the second day, he refuted all which he spoke about the day before, and explained that the institutions of the Sages were infallible and mustn’t be altered in the slightest. He blatantly stated that those who defy the words of the sages are undoubtedly wicked and that their end will be bitter. He finished his sermon by explaining to that Reb Shmelke was a righteous man and that without him the community would fall into depravity. This sermon was reportedly effective, and following it, several of Reb Shmelke's greatest opponents asked for his forgiveness.

Reb Shmelke died on April 28, 1778, in his residence in Nikolsburg. On his deathbed, he told his disciples that he had the spirit of the Prophet Samuel in him, stating, "You should know that my soul is that of the prophet Samuel. Proof of this is that my name, like the prophet's, is Shmuel. The prophet was a Levi, and so am I. The Prophet Shmuel lived to be 52 years, and I am today 52 years old. Only the prophet was called Shmuel, but I have remained Shmelke."

== Legacy and family ==
After his death, the community elected Gershon Chajes to succeed him as Chief Rabbi of Moravia. After his death in 1789, the community appointed Reb Shmelke's disciple, Mordecai Benet as the Chief Rabbi of Moravia. Reb Shmelke and his wife Shaindel had three children:

- Rabbi Yaakov Horowitz (1750–1803), became a prominent Hasidic rabbi in Hungary.
- Rabbi Zevi Joshua Horowitz (1760–1816), became a prominent rabbi in Prostějov, married the daughter of his uncle Rabbi Pinchas Horowitz
- Tova Horowitz, married her cousin, Rabbi Jacob Horowitz, Av Beit Din of Pressburg (Bratislava).
