= Bostoner rebbe =

Bostoner Rebbe may refer to:

- Pinchos Dovid Horowitz, the first rebbe of the Bostoner hasidim
- Levi Yitzchak Horowitz, son of Pinchos Dovid Horowitz
- Mayer Alter Horowitz, Bostoner rebbe of Jerusalem, 2nd son of Levi Yitzchak Horowitz
- Naftali Yehuda Horowitz, Bostoner rebbe of Boston, 3rd son of Levi Yitzchak Horowitz
- Chaim Avrohom Horowitz, Bostoner rebbe of New York and Beit Shemesh
