= Ravitz =

Ravitz is a surname originating from the Polish town of Rawicz. Notable people with this surname include:

- Avraham Ravitz (1934–2009), Israeli politician
- Mel Ravitz (d. 2010), American professor, progressive politician, sociologist, and community advocate
- Michal Ravitz (born 1986), Israeli football defender
- Natalie Ravitz, American communications director
- Nate Ravitz, American sportswriter and show host
- Rivka Ravitz (born 1976), Israeli political administrator
- Yehudit Ravitz (born 1956), Israeli singer-songwriter, composer and music producer
