= Mayer Alter Horowitz =

American Hasidic rabbi

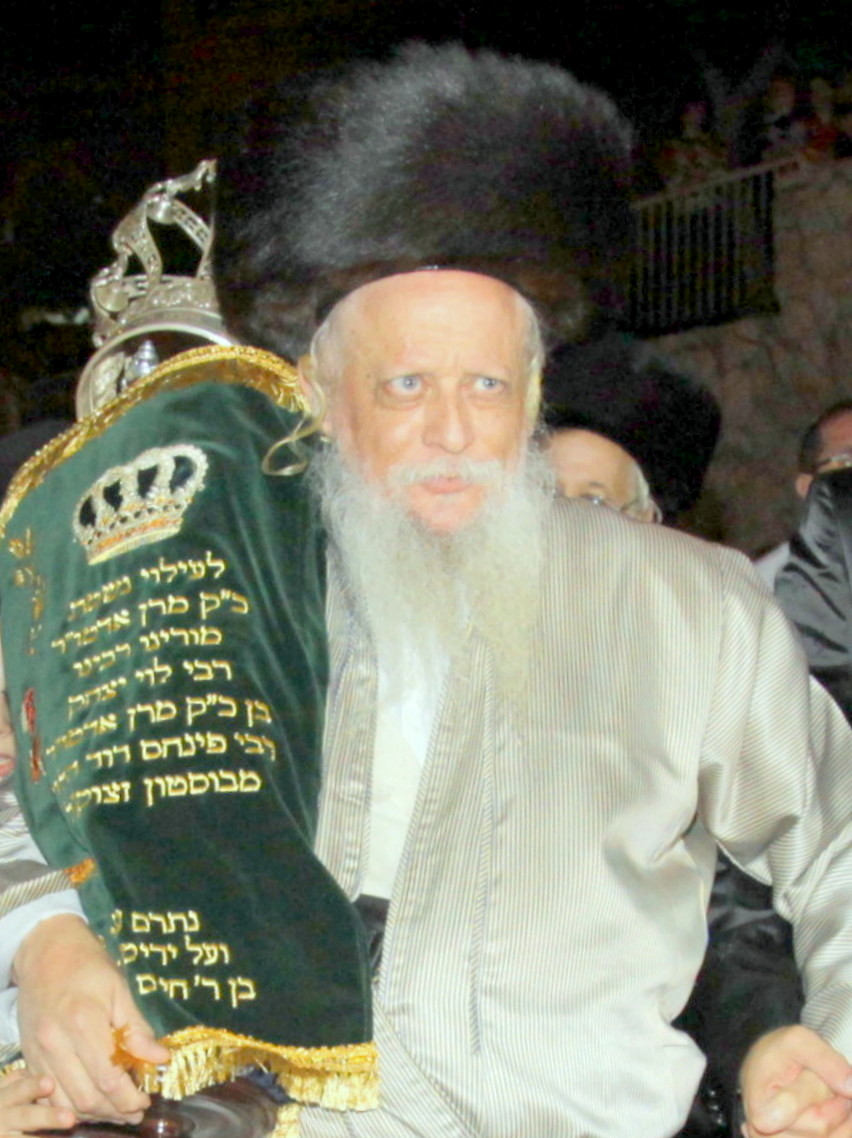
- Horowitz in 2013
- Title: Bostoner Rebbe of Jerusalem

Personal life
- Born: Mayer Alter Horowitz Boston, Massachusetts
- Parents: Levi Yitzchak Horowitz (father); Raichel Ungar (mother)
- Dynasty: Boston

Religious life
- Religion: Judaism

Jewish leader
- Predecessor: Levi Yitzchak Horowitz
- Began: December 2009
- Dynasty: Boston

Mayer Alter Horowitz is an American Hasidic rabbi. Since 2009, he has been the Bostoner rebbe of Jerusalem.

== Early life and education ==
Horowitz was born in Boston, the son of Levi Yitzchak Horowitz, the second Bostoner rebbe, and Raichel Unger Leifer. He is a ninth-generation descendant in the male line of Shmuel Shmelke Horowitz, the Nikolsburger rebbe. His older brother, Pinchos Dovid Horowitz, was the Bostoner-Chuster rabbi of Borough Park, Brooklyn, and his younger brother, Naftali Yehuda Horowitz, is the Bostoner rebbe of Brookline, Massachusetts.

Horowitz received his rabbinic ordination at the Ponevezh Yeshiva in Bnei Brak and Beth Medrash Govoha in Lakewood, New Jersey.

From 1969 to 1989 he was the Senior Rabbi of Congregation Beth Pinchas in Brookline, Massachusetts.

== Move to Israel ==
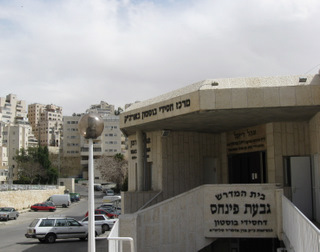
The Israel Boston Chassidic Center complex on Ruzhin Street, Har Nof, Jerusalem

In 1984 he and a group of Bostoner Hasidim immigrated to Israel and helped found Mosdos Boston of Israel, which established the Bostoner community of Har Nof. He became the Senior Rabbi of the Givat Pinchas synagogue, continuing in that capacity as Bostoner Rebbe of Jerusalem. In 1980, Horowitz helped establish Kollel Boston in the Bukharim quarter of Jerusalem. The Kollel moved to Har Nof with the establishment of the Bostoner community there.

From 1984 to 1989, Horowitz traveled back and forth between Boston and Har Nof, and beginning in 1989 settled permanently in Har Nof. In the late 1980s, he established a second synagogue in Har Nof, called Beis Shlomo, and continued as Senior Rabbi until 1995.

In 1998, he helped his father establish the Bostoner Community in Beitar Illit.

In 2007, he founded Machon HaNesher HaGadol, a publication company.

== As Grand Rabbi ==
In 2009, after the death of his father, he was designated to succeed his father in Har Nof. He also took his father's position as a member of the Moetzes Gedolei HaTorah of Agudath Israel of Israel.

Horowitz frequently travels to Jewish communities in Israel, Europe, and North America to proselytize for Bostoner Hasidism. Since becoming Bostoner Rebbe of Jerusalem in 2009, he has visited Waterbury, Connecticut, Chicago, Atlanta, Dallas, Denver, and Budapest, among others.

In the summer of 2012, Horowitz helped launch a weekly magazine publication in conjunction with The Jerusalem Post called Kosher English, designed to help Israeli Haredi readers learn and improve their English-language skills, and supervises its publication.

In the Bostoner tradition, Horowitz has composed dozens of original songs and melodies including "Borey Niv" "Re'ay Nah" and "Yivorechicho"
