= Chaim Avrohom Horowitz =

Polish-born American rabbi

Rabbi Chaim Avrohom Horowitz
- חיים אברהם הורוויץ
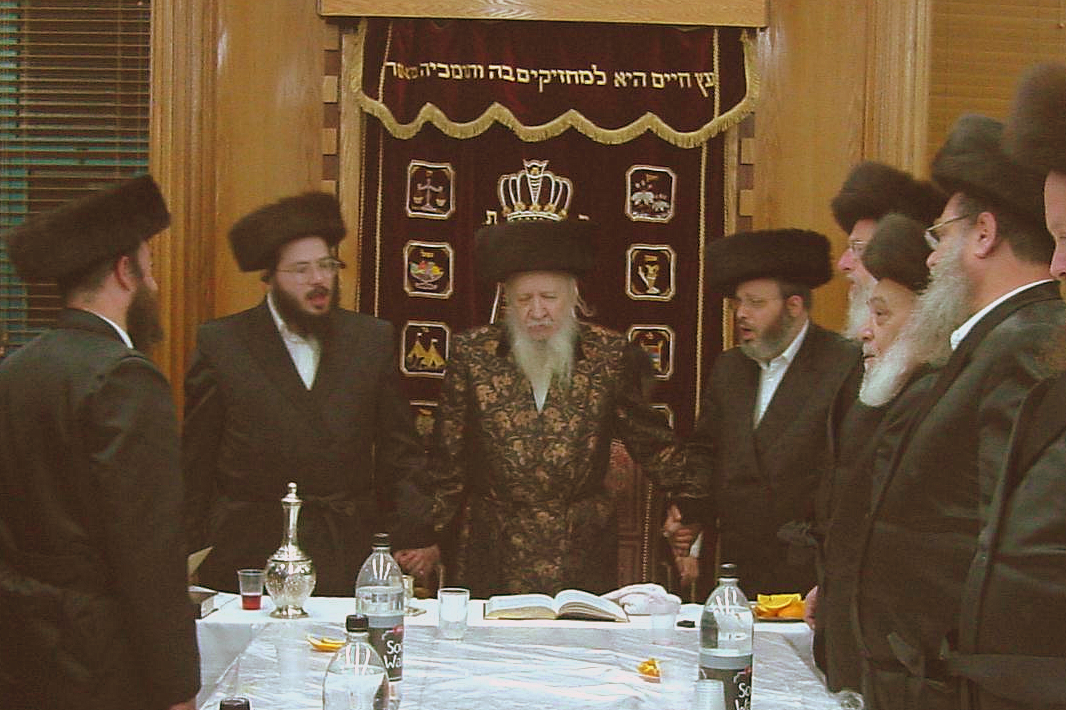
- Preceded by: Moshe Horowitz (father)

Bostoner Rebbe, Grand Rabbi of the Boston Jewish Hasidic sect
- Incumbent
- Assumed office 1985

Founder of the Bostoner community in Ramat Beit Shemesh, Israel

Personal details
- Born: 1933 Poland
- Died: 2016
- Spouse: Miriam Adler
- Children: Yaakov Yitzchak "Yankel", Yisrael Yona (son), seven daughters
- Occupation: Rabbi
- Known for: Composed contemporary Chasidic music

Chaim Avrohom Horowitz (Yiddish: חיים אברהם הורוויץ; 1933–2016) was a Polish-born American rabbi. In 1985, he became Bostoner Rebbe, Grand Rabbi of the Boston Jewish Hasidic sect, established in 1915 by his grandfather Pinchas Duvid Horowitz, and named after the city of Boston, Massachusetts, US.

== Biography ==
He was a student of Aharon Kotler. After the death of Pinchas Duvid in 1941 his eldest son, Moshe Horowitz (1909-1985), held the position of Bostoner Rebbe in New York until his death in 1985, following Chasidic tradition.

As the eldest son of Moshe, Horowitz succeeded his father as the Bostoner Rebbe of New York. He later founded the Bostoner community in Ramat Beit Shemesh, Israel, where he resided. He composed contemporary Chasidic music; many of his compositions were performed by leading Jewish music artists of the day. Andy Statman credits him with being a major influence in his musical career, having performed several of the Horowitz's compositions on his recordings and in concert.

In 1954, Horowitz married Miriam Adler, daughter of Rebbe Elazar Adler of the Zvhil dynasty, who gave birth to their son Yaakov Yitzchak "Yankel" in 1956. He was raised in his maternal grandparent's home in the West Hollywood section of Los Angeles, and now serves as rabbi of the Bostoner Shul in Lawrence, New York. Horowitz married the daughter of Yonah Hass in his second marriage. They have one son, Yisrael Yona, and seven daughters.
