= Levi Yitzchak Horowitz =

American rabbi (1921–2009)

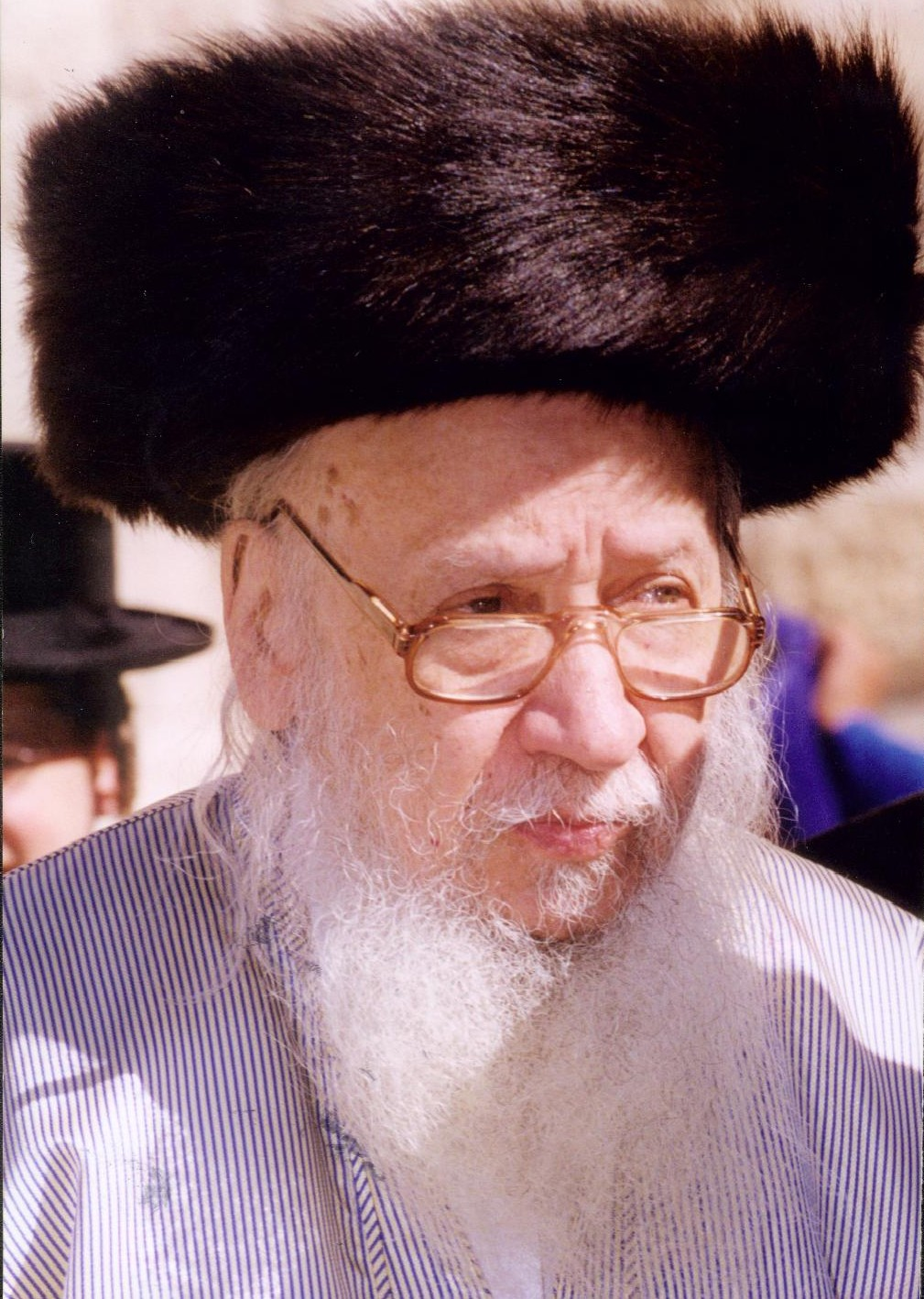
- at the Western Wall, Jerusalem
- Title: Second Bostoner Rebbe

Personal life
- Born: Levi Yitzchok Horowitz; July 3, 1921 Boston, Massachusetts, US
- Died: December 5, 2009 (aged 88) Shaare Zedek Medical Center, Jerusalem
- Buried: Mount of Olives, Jerusalem; 5 December 2009
- Spouse: Raichel Ungar, Yehudis
- Children: Pinchos Dovid Horowitz; Mayer Alter Horowitz; Naftali Yehuda Horowitz; Shayna Gittel; Toba Leah
- Parents: Pinchos Dovid Horowitz (father); Sora Sosha (mother)
- Dynasty: Boston

Religious life
- Religion: Judaism

Jewish leader
- Predecessor: Pinchos Dovid Horowitz
- Successor: Pinchos Dovid Horowitz (II) (1943-2021), Mayer Alter Horowitz; Naftali Yehuda Horowitz
- Began: 1944
- Ended: 2009
- Dynasty: Boston

Levi Yitzchak HaLevi Horowitz (3 July 1921, Boston, 5 December 2009, Jerusalem) was a rabbi and the second rebbe of the Boston Hasidic Dynasty founded by his father, Pinchos Dovid Horowitz. He was the first American-born Hasidic rebbe and the founder of ROFEH International, a community-based medical referral and hospitality liaison support agency.

== Family ==
Horowitz's parents were Pinchos Dovid Horowitz, founder of the Boston Hasidic dynasty, and Sora Sosha Horowitz. His father died in November 1941. In November 1942 he married Raichel Unger Leifer of Cleveland, Ohio, a descendant of Naftali Tzvi of Ropshitz.

== Rabbinic career ==
In 1943, Horowitz was one of over 400 rabbis led by Rabbi Eliezer Silver and Rabbi Baruch Korff who traveled to Washington, D.C., just before Yom Kippur, to ask President Franklin D. Roosevelt to rescue Jews from Hitler.

The New England Chassidic Center in Brookline.

Upon becoming leader of the Bostoners in 1944, after his marriage and ordination at Yeshiva Torah Vodaath, he announced that his primary thrust as rebbe would be aimed at the area's large number of college students, many of whom were away from home

In 1984, Horowitz established Givat Pincus, a Hasidic community in the Har Nof neighborhood of Jerusalem and began dividing his time between Israel and Boston. In 1999, an additional community was established in Beitar for the next generation of Bostoner Chassidim.

Horowitz served as a member of the Moetzes Gedolei HaTorah of Agudath Israel of Israel.

At the time of his death, he resided both in the U.S. and in Israel spending half a year in each country. Day-to-day leadership in his community had already passed on to his children.

== Death and succession ==
Horowitz suffered a cardiac arrest on July 6, 2009, and was hospitalized in the Sharei Tzedek hospital in Jerusalem. He died on December 5, 2009, and was buried that night on the Mount of Olives.

Per his will, he was succeeded by all his sons:

- his eldest son, the Chuster rabbi, Pinchos Duvid Horowitz(II) (died 2021) as Bostoner rebbe of Borough Park, Brooklyn
- his second son, Mayer Alter, as Bostoner rebbe of Jerusalem
- his third son, Naftali Yehuda, as Bostoner rebbe of Boston.
