= Yaakov Yitzchak Horowitz (American rabbi) =

American rabbi

Rabbi Yaakov Yitzchak Horowitz
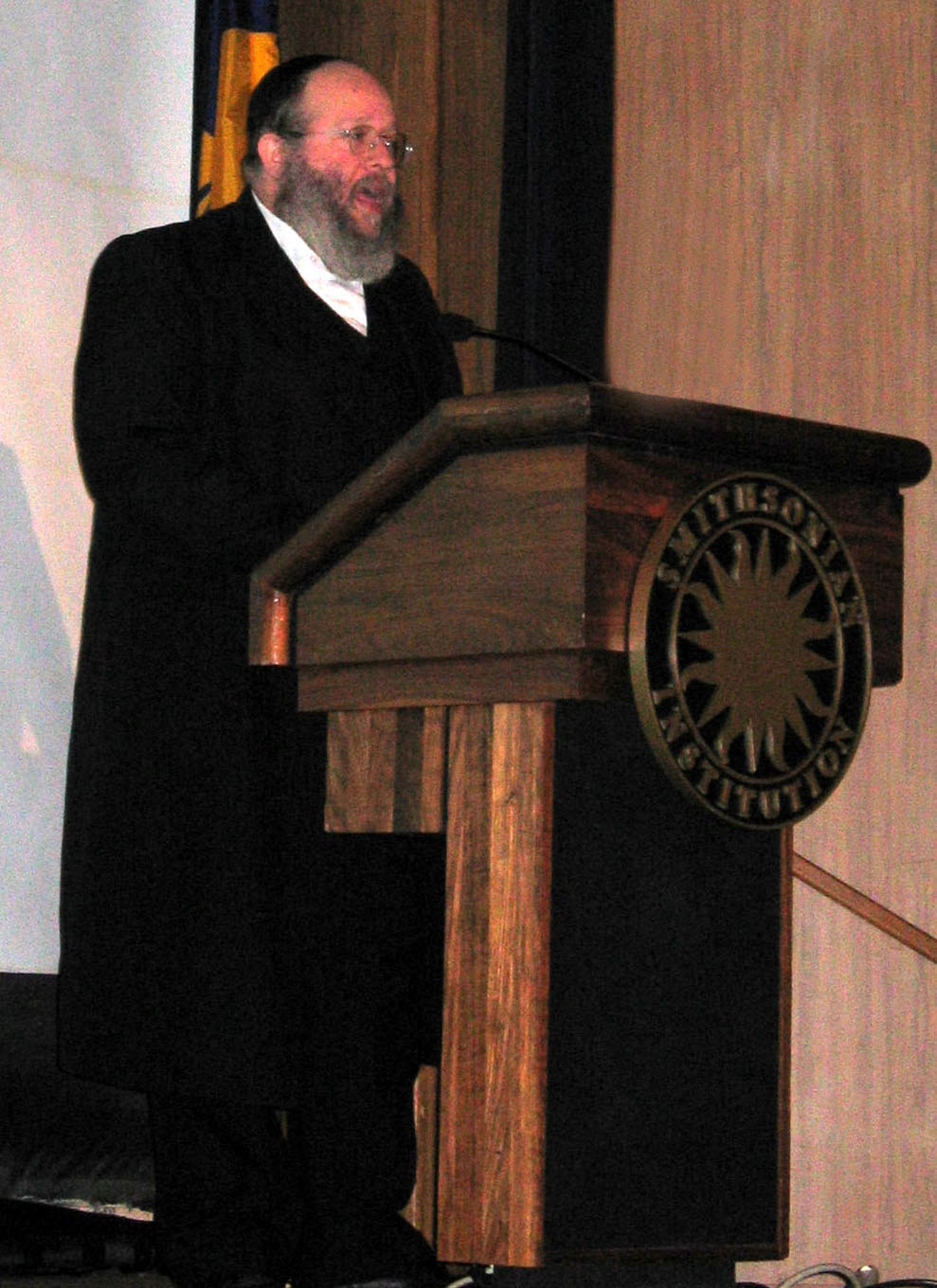
- Rabbi Yaakov Horowitz giving a lecture at the Smithsonian Institution in connection with the George Washington University Foodways Symposium, October 11, 2004.

Personal life
- Born: 1956 (age 69–70) United States
- Spouse: Chansie Weinberger
- Children: 8
- Parent(s): Rabbi Chaim Avrohom Horowitz; Miriam (née Adler)
- Dynasty: Boston
- Education: Beth Medrash Gevoha

Religious life
- Religion: Judaism
- Denomination: Hasidic Judaism

Jewish leader
- Synagogue: Bostoner Beis Medrash
- Dynasty: Boston

Yaakov Yitzchak Horowitz is an American rabbi and an expert on kosher food production.

Rabbi Horowitz is a fourth-generation American Chasidic rabbi, a scion of the Bostoner Chasidic Dynasty, and the founder of American Jewish Legacy, a nonprofit research organization that promotes Jewish heritage in the United States. He is also an educator, pulpit rabbi, and lecturer on the American Jewish experience. He is a noted expert in Jewish law, particularly regarding the Kosher Code and the production of Matzo for Passover.

He is particularly associated with Manischewitz, the continent's largest producer of kosher food, where he held a key position for over two decades. In addition to serving as the supervising rabbi of the Manischewitz group of companies on behalf of the Orthodox Union, he has also served as the course director of the kosher workshop at Rutgers University.

== Early life ==
Horowitz was born in 1956 to Chaim Avrohom Horowitz, the Bostoner Rebbe of New York and Ramat Bet Shemesh, and to Miriam, daughter of Rebbe Elazar Adler, the Zvhiler Rebbe of Los Angeles of the Zvhil dynasty.

Horowitz was raised by his maternal grandparents in Los Angeles.

Horowitz studied in a number of Talmudic seminaries including Beth Medrash Gevoha of Lakewood, New Jersey, and was ordained as a rabbi.

== Career ==
Horowitz joined Dor Yesharim, the Committee for the Prevention of Jewish Genetic Diseases, in 1986 as Director of Development. His work included publicizing the important work of this organization.

=== Chasidic Center of Nassau County ===
In 1992, Horowitz founded the Bostoner Bais Medrash of Lawrence (Chasidic Center of Nassau County) well known for its innovative youth programs and community service projects.

=== Kashrut ===
==== The Orthodox Union ====
Beginning his rabbinical work in the field of kosher food supervision (Kashrus) in 1989, Rabbi Horowitz joined and became employed by the Orthodox Union (OU), the largest kosher food supervisory organization in the world. As Rabbinic Coordinator, he supervised the kosher food programs of Nestle Beverage, Smuckers and a number of other nationally recognized manufacturers of kosher products. He was instrumental in the creation and implementation of the Ingredient Approval Registry, the system which currently maintains the kosher status of all ingredients found in over 8,000 OU supervised food facilities in 80 countries.

==== Specialist in Passover food supervision ====
Horowitz was assigned by the OU to oversee the Manischewitz Food Company in 1996 and on behalf of the OU and he served as Company Rabbi and Director, Kosher Development Operations, Systems and Marketplace of the Manischewitz Companies.

Horowitz is one of the world experts of Passover Matzo and authored the OU manual on this subject having assisted in matzo and matzo flour production in Israel, England, Mexico, Argentina and the former USSR. After two decades of service, Horowitz left the OU in 2016.

=== American Jewish history ===
Horowitz founded the American Jewish Legacy (AJL) in 1998. The AJL is a national effort to preserve and document the unique, rich history of traditional Jewish congregations, individuals, rabbis and communities in the United States from Colonial times to the present. Working with noted academics, educational institutions, public and private archives, regional and national historic organizations across the country and abroad, the AJL has initiated projects and activities which seek to save this important historical resource and to gather archival information which is in imminent danger of being lost. The AJL also seeks to publicize the role Orthodox Jews played in the historical development of the American Jewish community and has reprinted of several important works dealing with the history of the Orthodox Jewish community in the U.S..

The American Jewish Legacy's exhibition, From the Mountains to the Prairie- 350 Years of Kosher & Jewish Life in America 1654-2004, was created in connection with the 350th anniversary celebration of Jewish settlement in America. The exhibition opened at the Jacob K. Javits Center in NY in October of 2003 and then toured nationally traveling to UCLA in 2006 and later to the Columbus Jewish Historical Society in 2010. The exhibition received academic and popular acclaim from the scholarly community, lay leaders, and the media – including the New York Times.

In 2007, the Manischewitz Company commissioned the AJL to produce a series of American Jewish History panels which appeared on over one million Passover Matzo boxes. These panels publicized the commitment of the American Jewish community to the kosher laws and religious observance throughout its history.

In 2010, AJL created an American Jewish History Haggadah and printed 125,000 copies, which were distributed in 220 ShopRite supermarkets in six states. In 2022 the ALJ published an expanded and fully illustrated Haggadah with historical essays entitled, The American Jewish Legacy Passover Haggadah. This beautifully designed Passover Haggadah includes the classic traditional Order of the Passover Seder, with a full English translation, as well as a historical supplement with an overview of the holiday of Passover as observed in America over the last 300 years. Through the use of periodicals, newspapers and colorful vignettes, this volume brings to life well-documented historical events and depicts how Jews played an important role in the growth & development of the United States. These include Matzo & Kosher food in the Colonies (1784); Colonial Kosher Meat Certification and Commerce for Export (1776); Passover Seders on the battlefield - Confederate and Union; Jewish Observance during the Gold Rush and the sale of Wine, Meat and Matzo in San Francisco (1851); Practicing Sabbath, and Passover on the Prairie (c.1900).

=== Lecturer and educator ===
Horowitz is an educator, lecturer, and spokesperson for kosher food and the American Jewish Historical experience. He has served as the course director of the kosher workshop at Rutgers University and has lectured at numerous national and international events, conferences and symposiums including Wal‐Mart's corporate headquarters, George Washington University's Foodways Symposium at the Smithsonian in Washington, D.C. and Portland State University

== Personal life ==
Horowitz was married to Chansie Weinberger in 1980. She is the daughter of Rabbi Alter Yitzchak Weinberger. Weinberger was a descendant of distinguished rabbinic families, and a prominent communal leader in Turka, Ukraine and assisted many refugees during World War II. They have eight children.
