= Machon Yaakov =

Yeshiva in Har Nof, Jerusalem

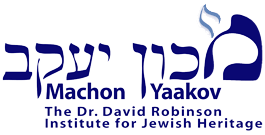
- Founders: Rabbi Beryl Gershenfeld, Rabbi Avraham Yitzchak Jacobs
- Established: 2005
- Director: Rabbi Avraham Yitzchak Jacobs
- Faculty: Rabbi Yosef Lynn, Rabbi Jonathan Taub, Rabbi Immanuel Bernstein
- Address: 10 Ibn Denan
- Location: Har Nof, Jerusalem, Israel
- Coordinates: 31.782152°N 35.171696°E
- Interactive map of Machon Yaakov
- Website: www.machonyaakov.org

Machon Yaakov is a baal teshuva yeshiva for men located in Har Nof, Jerusalem. Its faculty and student body are all English speaking. It is named for Yaakov Rosenberg, founder of Machon Shlomo, a similar baal teshuva yeshiva. Beryl Gershenfeld is the rosh yeshiva (dean) of both yeshivas

== Program ==
Machon Yaakov, was founded in 2005 to expand the work of Machon Shlomo The program, which is designed for students with little or no formal Jewish education, has a one-year minimum and a two-year maximum. Enrollment is limited to about 35 students, generally weighted about 2/3-1/3 between the first- and second- year programs.

== See also ==
- Baal teshuva
- Orthodox Judaism outreach
- Jewish fundamentalism
