= Boston (Hasidic dynasty) =

American Hasidic dynasty

Boston Hasidic Dynasty
- The Beit Pinchas New England Chassidic Center on Beacon Street, Brookline, Massachusetts, the location of the Bostoner court in the United States

Total population
- 1000 Families

Founder
- Rabbi Pinchas David Horowitz

Regions with significant populations
- United States, Israel

Religions
- Hasidic Judaism

Languages
- English, Yiddish, Hebrew

Related ethnic groups
- Nikolsburg, Lelov

Website
- Official Website of the Bostoner Shul

Boston is a Hasidic dynasty, originally established in 1915 by Rabbi Pinchas David Horowitz, a scion of the Nikolsburg Hasidic dynasty. Following the custom of European Chassidic Courts, where the Rebbe was called after the name of his city, the Bostoner branch of Hasidic Judaism was named after Boston, Massachusetts. The most senior and well-known of the Bostoner Rebbes in contemporary times was Grand Rabbi Levi Yitzchak Horowitz, who died in December 2009.

Amid a spectrum of notable accomplishments and "firsts in America," Bostoner Hasidim claim to be skilled in applying ancient Jewish values in modern society, engaging in outreach to students, and providing tangible help for the sick and their families during crucial times of need. Bostoner Hasidim also pride themselves on their musical tradition.

The worldwide community of Bostoner Hasidism has headquarters in Brookline, Massachusetts and Har Nof, Israel, with additional branches in Beit Shemesh, Israel; Beitar Illit, Israel; Flatbush, Brooklyn; Highland Park, New Jersey; Lawrence, Nassau County, New York; and Monsey, New York.

== Origins ==
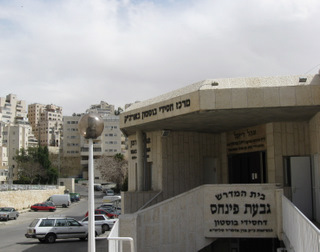
The Israel Boston Chassidic Center on Ruzhin Street, Har Nof, Jerusalem

Grand Rabbi Pinchas David Horowitz, the first Bostoner Rebbe, a scion of Shmelke of Nikolsburg and the Lelov dynasty, was born in Jerusalem in Ottoman Syria. He first arrived in Boston in 1915 from the Russian Empire, where he had gone to collect charity.

Shortly after his arrival, Rabbi Pinchas David was accepted as Rebbe by a group of followers he attracted from within the Boston Jewish community. However, in 1939, he left Boston and moved to Brooklyn where he opened the Bostoner beth midrash of Williamsburg, Brooklyn. After his death in 1941, his older son, Rav Moshe, succeeded him in New York, while his younger son, Levi Yitzchak Horowitz, moved back to Boston in 1943 and built the New England Chassidic Center.

In his lifetime, Reb Moshe founded the Bostoner beth midrash of Crown Heights, Brooklyn and the Bostoner beth midrash of Borough Park, Brooklyn. In 1985, upon the passing of Reb Moshe, his eldest son, Chaim Avrom Horowitz, succeeded him as Bostoner Rebbe of New York. In 1989, Reb Moshe's younger son, Pinchas Dovid, moved to Flatbush, Brooklyn to establish a community there. He eventually accepted the mantle of Bostoner Rebbe of Flatbush. In 2006, Rav Chaim Avrom moved to Beit Shemesh in Israel to establish a community there. He died in 2016 while visiting America for his granddaughter's wedding to the grandson of the Skverer and Rachmanstrifker Rebbes. He was succeeded by his sons, Rabbi Yaakov Yitzchak Horowitz of Lawrence, NY, And Rav Yisrael Yona Horowitz of Boro Park.

In the mid-1980s, Levi Yitzchak Horowitz established another Boston community in Har Nof, Jerusalem, and would spend half of the year in Boston and half of the year in Jerusalem. On Saturday, December 5, 2009, Levi Yitzchok Horowitz died in Jerusalem, survived by his three sons and two daughters. In his spiritual will, the title of Grand Rabbi of Boston was bestowed upon all three surviving sons. Pinchas Dovid Horowitz, the Chuster Rebbe of Borough Park, the oldest, serves as Bostoner Rebbe in New York; Mayer Alter Horowitz serves as Bostoner Rebbe in Har Nof; and Naftali Yehuda Horowitz, the youngest, serves as Bostoner Rebbe in Boston.

== Lineage of the Boston dynasty ==
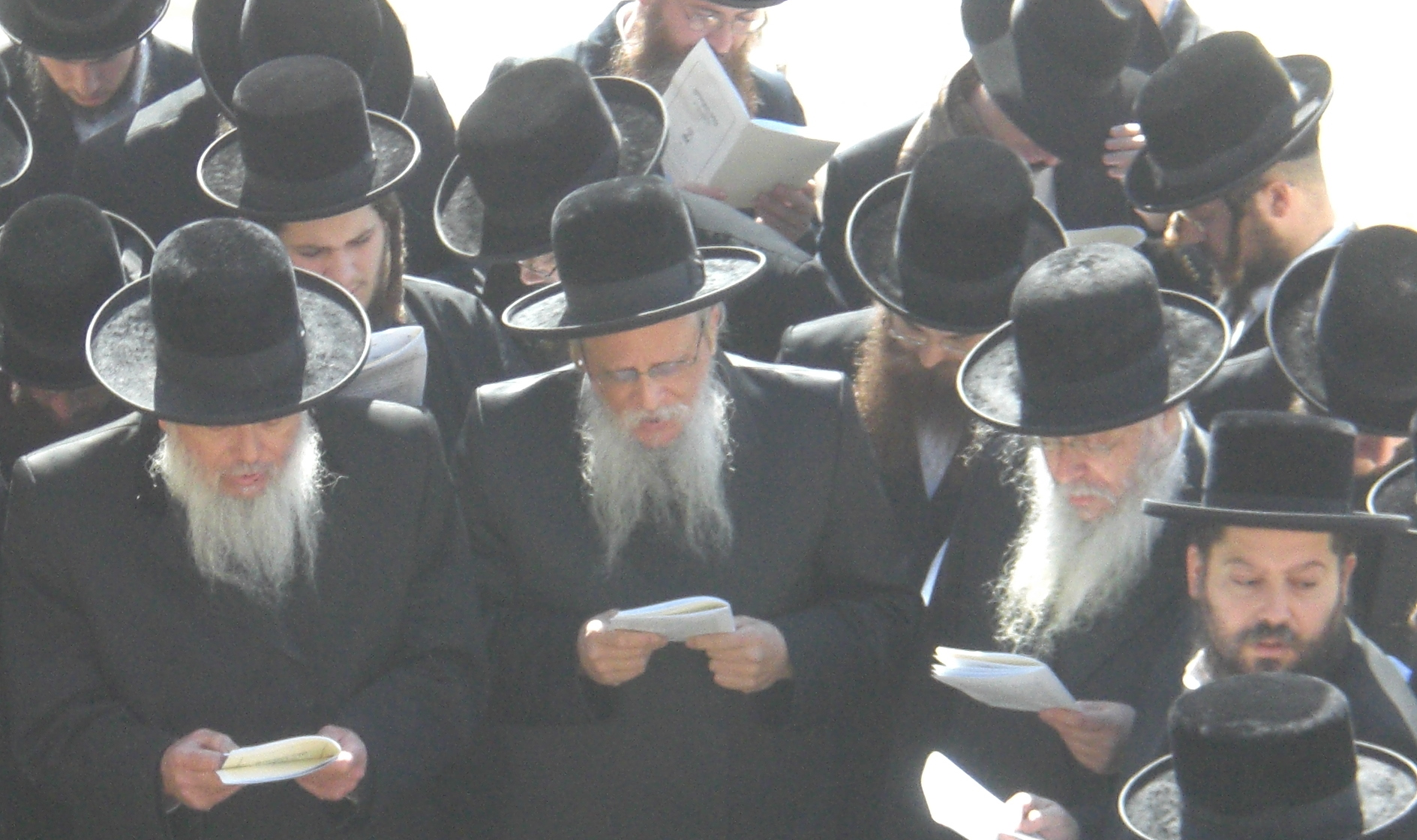
L-to-R, Pinchas Duvid Horowitz Mayer Alter Horowitz, Naftali Yehudah Horowitz

- Grand Rabbi Pinchos Duvid Horowitz (1876–1941) first Bostoner Rebbe
  - Grand Rabbi Moshe Horowitz (died 1985) Bostoner Rebbe of New York – Born in Jerusalem, he was the elder son of Rabbi Pinchas and the first Chasidic Rebbe to succeed his father in America, establishing a Bostoner Beis Medrash in Crown Heights, Brooklyn and later in Borough Park, Brooklyn. He was active in the formation of Agudath Israel of America and a member of its Moetzes Gedolei HaTorah (Council of Torah Sages), and was a founder of Yeshiva Torah Vodaas. He worked with the Vaad Hatzalah to help settle Jewish refugees in America during and after World War II.
    - Grand Rabbi Chaim Avrohom Horowitz, Bostoner Rebbe of Borough Park 1985 to 2016 and Ramat Beit Shemesh
      - Rabbi Yaakov Yitzchak Horowitz of Lawrence, NY – son of Grand Rabbi Chaim Avrohom
      - Rabbi Yisroel Yona Horowitz Bostoner Rebbe of Boro Park – son of Grand Rabbi Chaim Avrohom
    - Grand Rabbi Pinchas Duvid Horowitz (Niftar in 2023/5783) Bostoner Rebbe of Flatbush – son of Grand Rabbi Moshe Horowitz
      - Grand Rabbi Mordechai Horowitz Admur M'Boston Flatbush Shlita oldest son of Grand Rabbi Pinchos Dovid of Flatbush (Crowned as Grand Rabbi to succeed his holy fathers place Shabbos Kodesh Parshas Shelach 5783/2023)
      - Rabbi Chaim Avrohom Horowitz of Monsey Admur M'Boston Monsey Shlita – second son of Grand Rabbi Pinchos Duvid of Flatbush
      - Rabbi Levi Yitzchok Horowitz of Montreal serves as Rav in Khal Chassidim Montreal – third son of Grand Rabbi Pinchos Duvid of Flatbush
      - Rabbi Yisroel Horowitz of Boston Lakewood – fourth son of Grand Rabbi Pinchos Duvid of Flatbush
      - Rabbi Alter Yehuda Tzvi Horowitz of Boro Park – fifth son of Grand Rabbi Pinchos Duvid of Flatbush
      - Rabbi Moshe Horowitz of Boro Park – sixth and youngest son of Grand Rabbi Pinchos Duvid of Flatbush
  - Grand Rabbi Levi Yitzchak Horowitz, (1921–2009) the Bostoner Rebbe in Brookline and Har Nof – son of Rabbi Pinchas David Horowitz
    - Rabbi Pinchas Duvid Horowitz (1943–2021), Chuster Ruv – eldest son of Grand Rabbi Levi Yitzchok, successor to his father as Bostoner–Chuster Rebbe of New York, and Chuster–Bostoner Rebbe of Betar Illit
      - Rabbi Moshe Shimon Horowitz, Bostoner Rebbe (Betar Illit) - eldest son of the Chuster–Bostoner Rebbe successor to his father and grandfather as Bostoner Rebbe of Betar Illit
      - Rabbi Yisroel Aharon Horowitz, Chuster Ruv – son of the Chuster–Bostoner Rebbe and son-in-law of Rabbi Yitzchok Arie Weiss, Horodonka Rebbe of Manchester, England
      - Reb Shia'le Horowitz, Bostoner Rebbe of Monsey, New York – son of the Chuster–Bostoner Rebbe
      - Rabbi Yechiel Mechel Horowitz, Bostoner Rebbe of Highland Park, New Jersey – son of the Chuster–Bostoner Rebbe
      - Rabbi Avrum Horowitz of Monsey - youngest son of Chuster-Bostoner Rebbe
    - Rabbi Mayer Alter Horowitz of Jerusalem – middle son of Grand Rabbi Levi Yitzchok, successor to his father as Bostoner Rebbe in the Har Nof section of Jerusalem.
    - Rabbi Naftali Yehuda Horowitz, Bostoner Rebbe (Boston) – youngest son of Grand Rabbi Levi Yitzchok, successor to his father as the Bostoner Rebbe of Boston.
      - Rabbi Meilich Horowitz Rav – son of current Rebbe Naftoli Yehuda Horowitz
