= Avraham Ravitz =

Israeli politician (1934–2009)

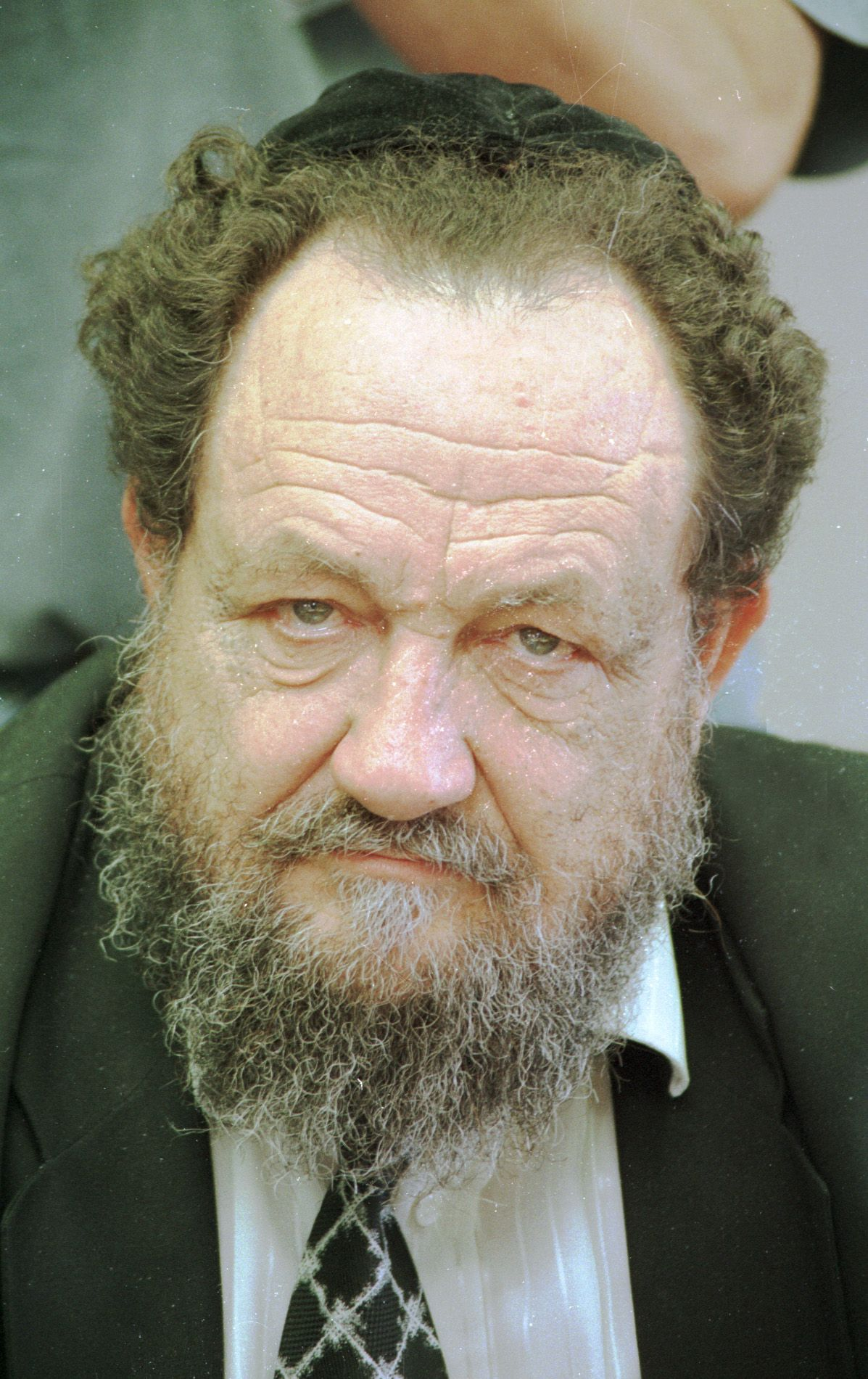

Faction represented in the Knesset
- 1988–1992: Degel HaTorah
- 1992–1996: United Torah Judaism
- 1996: Degel HaTorah
- 1996–1999: United Torah Judaism
- 1999: Degel HaTorah
- 1999–2005: United Torah Judaism
- 2005–2006: Degel HaTorah
- 2006–2008: United Torah Judaism
- 2008–2009: Degel HaTorah

Personal details
- Born: 13 January 1934 Tel Aviv, Mandatory Palestine
- Died: 26 January 2009 (aged 75) Jerusalem

Avraham Ravitz (Hebrew: אברהם רביץ; 13 January 1934 – 26 January 2009) was an Israeli politician and member of the Knesset for Degel HaTorah, which forms part of the United Torah Judaism alliance.

== Biography ==
Ravitz was born in 1934 in the Montefiore neighborhood of Tel Aviv to Hadassah and rabbi Aryeh Leib Ravitz, who had served as a neighborhood rabbi and head of the Rabbinical Court in Tel Aviv-Jaffa for many decades. Like his father, he studied at Hebron Yeshiva from the age of 13 for 13 intermittent years and received rabbinical ordination from there. He also studied for about a year at the Slabodka Yeshiva. In the year before Israel's independence, he joined the Lehi organization with several of his yeshiva friends. Later, he stated that the assassination of Lehi commander Avraham Stern was the reason for his joining the underground movement. Afterwards, he served in the IDF.

In the 1950s and 1960s he was a central activist in the "Chaver HaPoalim" organization.

Ravitz managed the vocational high school "Marom Zion" in Kiryat Noar, Jerusalem. Among his students was Meni Mazuz. He also served as a Rosh Mesivta at Midrashiat Noam in Pardes Hanna.

In the 1970s he was one of the heads of Ohr Somayach Yeshiva, which catered to those returning to Judaism and was founded around that time. For his livelihood, he worked as a construction contractor. In 1987, he was called upon by Rabbi Elazar Menachem Shach to manage Talmud Torah HaMasorah after the institution encountered financial difficulties. He held the position on a voluntary basis for about six months and, after stabilizing the institution, returned control to the institution’s manager.

=== Political activity ===
His political career began in 1983, when he, together with his close friend Rabbi Ika Yisraeli and Shimshon Polikman (the director of the Talmud Torah "HaMasorah"), ran an independent Haredi list called TALI for the Jerusalem Municipality. The list almost succeeded in securing a seat on the city council.

In 1984 he spoke at an election rally for the Shas party. In 1988 there was speculation that he would run for Knesset on the Shas list, but he ultimately decided against it.

Ahead of the 1988 Israeli legislative election, Rabbi Elazar Menachem Shach placed him at the top of the Degel HaTorah list for Knesset. At the founding conference of the movement held at Binyanei HaUma in Jerusalem, he declared passionately: "We will not just listen to the Torah sages; we will do what they tell us!"

He served as an MK on behalf of Degel HaTorah and later in United Torah Judaism, which is a union of Degel HaTorah and Agudat Yisrael. From then until his death, he served as chairman of the Degel HaTorah party. He was considered moderate and cautious regarding how the Haredim should use their power in the Knesset. In 1990, he opposed the toppling of Yitzhak Shamir's government following the instructions of Degel HaTorah's leader, Rabbi Shach, but when his name was called during the roll call vote, he announced, "With great sorrow, against."

From 1990 to 1992 he served as Deputy Minister of Housing, from 1996 to 1999 as chairman of the Knesset Finance Committee, and during the 15th Knesset he served as Deputy Speaker of the Knesset until he was appointed as Deputy Minister, and from 2001 to 2003 as Deputy Minister of Education. In 2005, he was appointed as Deputy Minister of Welfare without a minister above him.

In 2000, due to complications from the diabetes he suffered from, he underwent a kidney transplant. Prior to the surgery, his children held a halachic discussion about who would have the merit to donate the kidney. Eventually, they drew lots, and the eldest son, Moshe, a Rosh Mesivta at Nehora Yeshiva, was chosen. Following these events, Ravitz self-published a booklet titled "Consulting Kidneys: A Discussion on the Obligation to Save Lives and the Merit of This Mitzvah and Its Ramifications."

In November 2008 he announced his retirement from politics.

He died on 26 January 2009 at the age of 75, due to complications from diabetes. He was buried at Har HaMenuchot in Jerusalem.

== Commemoration ==
- A square named after him in Beitar Illit.
- The Ramat Avraham neighborhood in Beit Shemesh.
- A street in the Neve Yaakov neighborhood in Jerusalem.
- The "Morashat Rabbi Avraham Ravitz" charity association.
- "Chanukat Avraham" book, Torah novellae on Halacha and Aggadah regarding Chanukah.

== Family ==
He was married to Avigail (née Feller), born in New York, and was the father of twelve children. He resided in Bayit Vegan, Jerusalem.

His daughter-in-law, Rivka Ravitz, was the chief of staff at The President's Residence during Reuven (Rubi) Rivlin's term.
