= Pinchas David Horowitz =

Rabbi Pinchas David Horowitz (Hebrew: פינחס דוד הורוביץ; July 15, 1877 or 1876 - November 28, 1941) was a Hasidic rebbe and the founder of the Boston Hasidic dynasty, one of the first Hasidic courts in America.

== Biography ==
Born in Jerusalem, he was a paternal descendant of Zevi Joshua Horowitz, son of Shmelke Horowitz of Nikolsburg. He was sent as a representative and arbitrator by the Jerusalem community to Russia in an important European rabbinic dispute. The outbreak of World War I prevented his return to Palestine and in 1915 he went to Boston to collect money for charity (tzedakah). He attracted a small group of followers but soon left Boston for New York. In 1939 Rabbi Pinchas Horowitz relocated the congregation to the Williamsburg section of Brooklyn, remaining there until his death on November 28, 1941.

Horowitz's successors were his sons, rabbis Moshe Horowitz, the Bostoner Rebbe of New York, and Levi Yitzchok Horowitz, the Bostoner Rebbe of Boston and Har Nof, Jerusalem.
