= Rivka Ravitz =

Israeli Haredi political administrator (born 1976)

- רבקה רביץ
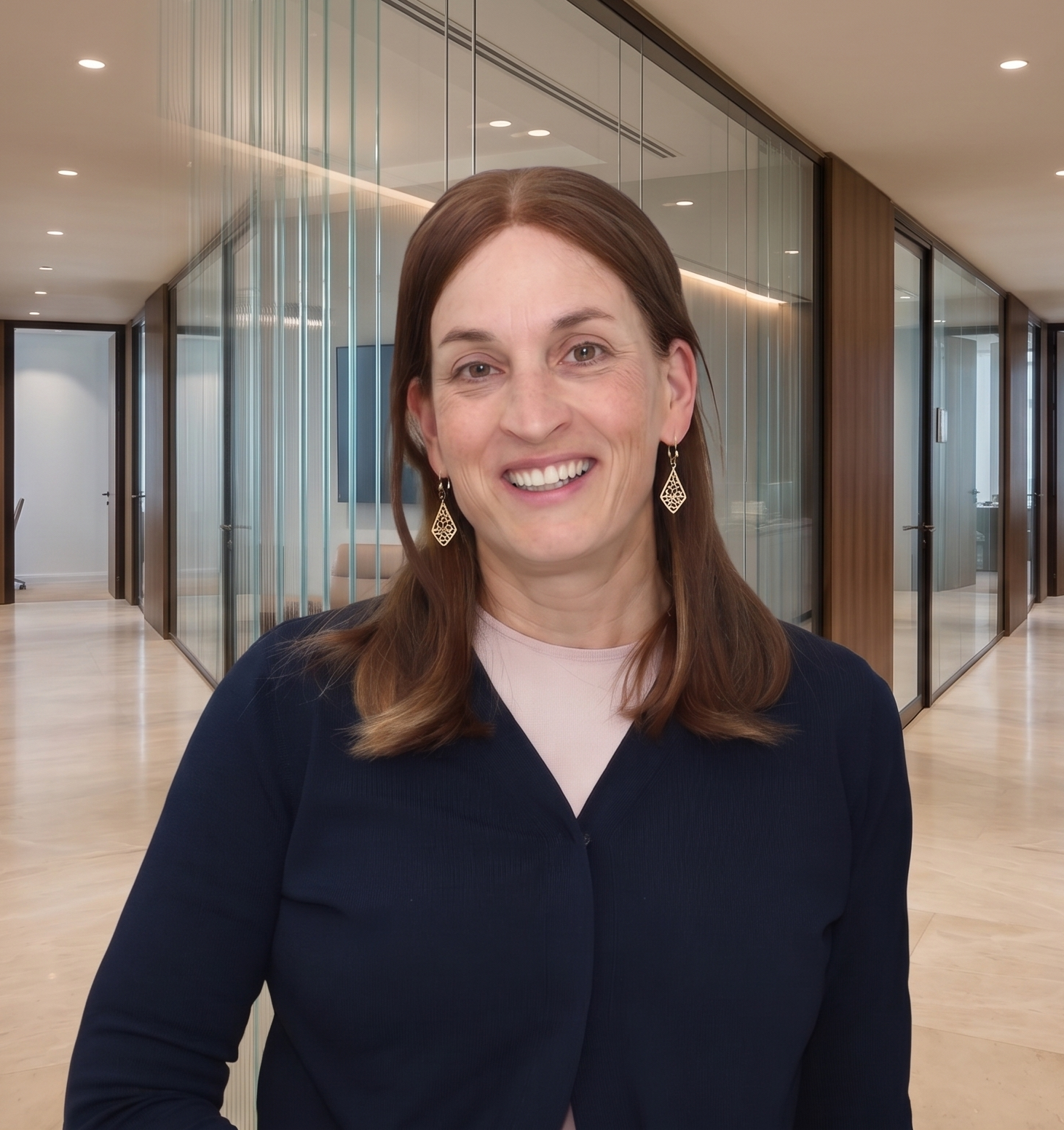
- Ravitz in 2018

Chief of Staff to the President of Israel
- In office 2014–2021
- President: Reuven Rivlin
- Succeeded by: Dikla Cohen Sheinfeld

Personal details
- Born: 1976 (age 49–50) Israel
- Spouse: Yitzhak Ravitz
- Children: 12
- Education: B.S. in Computer Science, Open University of Israel; MBA, Open University of Israel
- Occupation: Political adviser, Chief of staff

Rivka Ravitz (Hebrew: רבקה רביץ; born 1976) is an Israeli Haredi political administrator. Starting in 1999, she worked for Israeli politician Reuven Rivlin, first as his bureau chief and campaign adviser, and, since his election as President of Israel in 2014, as his chief of staff. She has received extensive media coverage for being a Haredi mother of 12 in a high-profile political position.

== Early life and education ==
She was born in Israel in 1976 to American immigrant parents. She is the second of 10 siblings. She attended the Bais Yaakov school system for elementary and high school, graduating with an English teaching certificate.

Later, after several years of working for Reuven Rivlin in the Knesset, she pursued a degree in management and computer science at the Open University of Israel. She then earned an MBA at that institution, and, as of 2017, is working on a PhD in public policy at the University of Haifa.

== Career ==
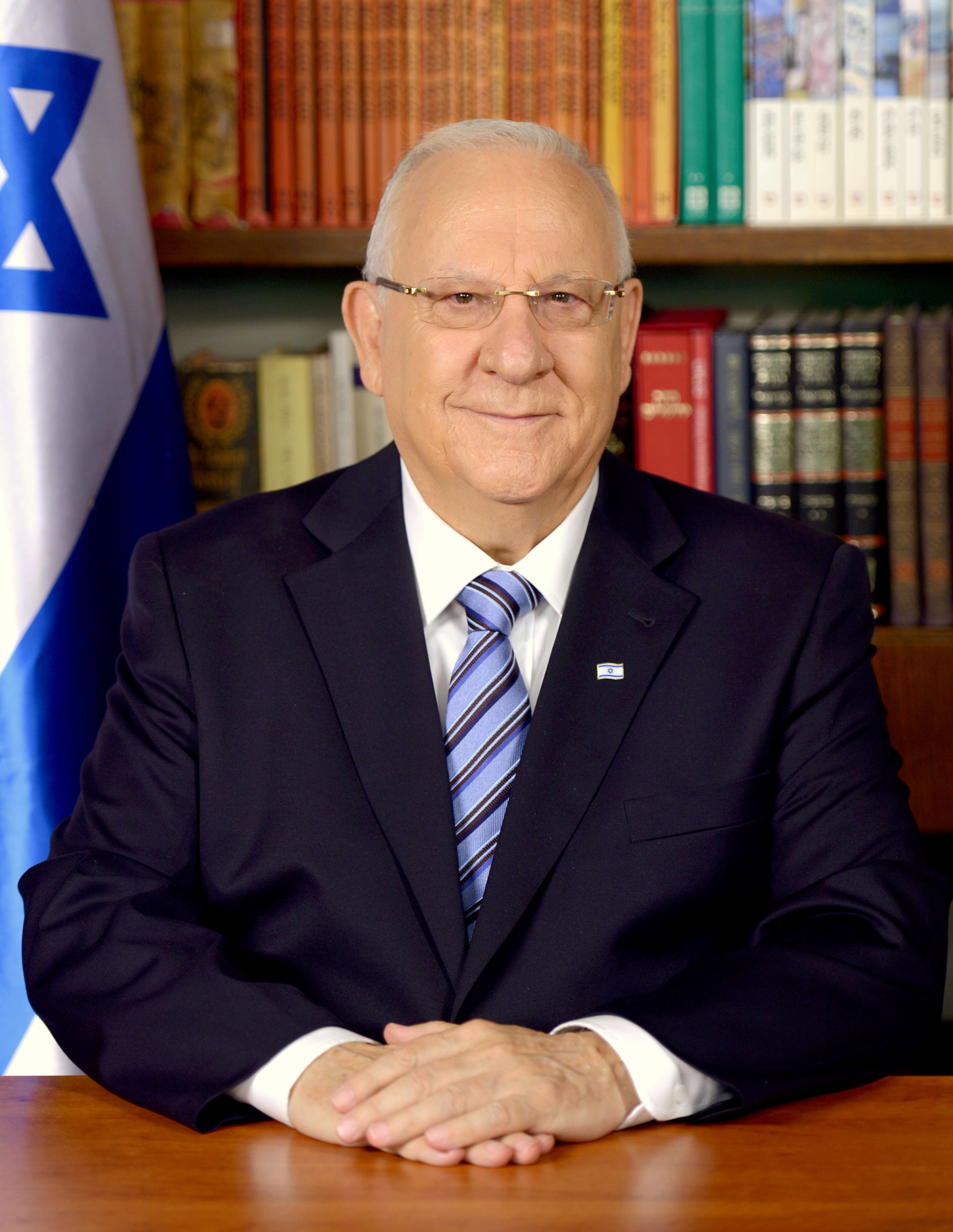
President of Israel Reuven Rivlin

After marrying at age 18, Ravitz began working part-time as a teacher. However, the pay was low – 700 shekels per month – so when her father-in-law, Rabbi Avraham Ravitz, head of the Knesset Finance Committee, needed a parliamentary assistant, she applied for the job. Three years later, she was forced to leave Ravitz's employ due to a new law prohibiting government officials from hiring family members. She then began working as a parliamentary assistant to Reuven Rivlin, another member of the Finance Committee, at a salary of 4,500 shekels per month. She went on to serve as his bureau chief, and managed many of his campaigns, including his successful campaigns for Speaker of the Knesset in 2003 and 2009, and his election as President of Israel in 2014, whereupon she became his chief of staff.

As chief of staff, Ravitz oversees Rivlin's entire staff, and schedules all his meetings and state visits, both in Israel and abroad. She also selects the gifts he gives on state visits. She oversees the hundreds of weekly letters issued from the president's office, including many that are translated into foreign languages. She accompanies Rivlin on most of his appearances at local events, as well as foreign visits to heads of state.

Ravitz considers her high-profile position an opportunity to display her religious commitment and make a Kiddush Hashem (sanctification of God's name). She wears modest clothing, and covers her hair with a wig. She does not fraternize with male colleagues or participate in "staff-consolidation days", and refrains from shaking hands when greeting men, in keeping with halakha. During Rivlin's 2015 visit to the Vatican, a photograph showing Pope Francis bowing to Ravitz while she remained erect led to media reports that the Haredi woman had refused to bow in greeting because Francis was wearing a cross. Later news reports clarified that Ravitz had bowed to Francis first, in lieu of shaking hands, and he had responded with his own bow, having been informed beforehand of her religious sensitivities. In 2023, she clarified the story, saying the ambassador had forgotten to tell the Pope's office that she would not be able to shake hands and bow beforehand and indeed, when she was forced to explain this herself to the pope, despite it being a high profile visit, the Pope had bowed to her in respect of her religious resilience. Traveling with the president, she observes the laws of Shabbat and kashrut as well.

During Rivlin's visit to the United States towards the end of his term, President Biden kneeled before Ravitz upon hearing that she is a mother of 12 children.

She was offered by then President-Elect Isaac Herzog to continue on in her position, but she decided not to accept.

== Personal life ==
She married at the age of 18 to Yitzhak Ravitz, who, between 2014 and 2018 served as deputy mayor of Beitar Illit. The family moved in late 2018 to Kiryat Ye'arim (Telz-Stone), where her husband was elected to the local council; in January 2019 he was elected as mayor in special elections held after the sudden death of the previous mayor. The couple has nine daughters and two sons. At home, Ravitz manages without a live-in housekeeper, but has cleaning help a few hours a week. She prepares meals the night before, and relies on her children to put away their own laundry. She receives time off from work on Fridays, Shabbat, and Jewish holidays. Despite her non-traditional career path for a Haredi woman, she and her husband maintain a strong religious home. They do not have internet access in the house, nor bring in any newspapers, secular or religious.
