= Naftali Yehuda Horowitz =

Hassidic Rebbe

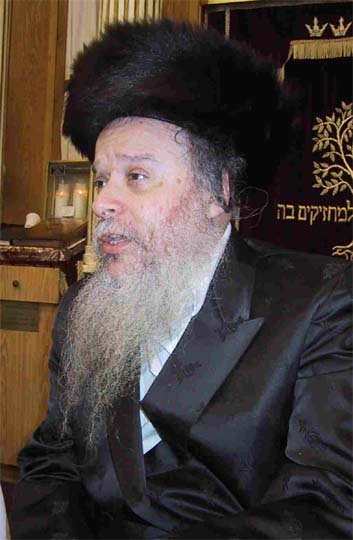
- Bostoner Rebbe of Boston
- Title: Grand Rabbi Naftali Yehuda Horowitz

Personal life
- Born: Naftali Yehuda Horowitz
- Parents: Levi Yitzchak Horowitz (father); Raichel Ungar (mother)
- Dynasty: Boston

Religious life
- Religion: Judaism

Jewish leader
- Predecessor: Levi Yitzchak Horowitz
- Began: December 2009
- Dynasty: Boston

Naftali Yehuda Halevi Horowitz is the Bostoner Rebbe, having succeeded his father, Grand Rabbi Levi Yitzchak Horowitz, the second Bostoner Rebbe, upon the latter's death in December 2009. He is the rebbe of the Boston Hasidic community from the New England Chassidic Center in Brookline, Massachusetts, built by his father, and also directs ROFEH International, the community-based medical referral and hospitality liaison support agency established by his father.

== Family ==
Naftali Yehudah Horowitz is the third and youngest son of Levi Yitzchak Horowitz and Raichel Unger Leifer. He is a ninth-generation descendant on the male line of Shmuel Shmelke Horowitz, the Nikolsburger rebbe. His eldest brother, Pinchos Dovid Horowitz, is the Bostoner-Chuster rabbi of Borough Park, Brooklyn, and his other brother Mayer Alter Horowitz is the Bostoner rebbe of Har Nof, Jerusalem. His sister Shayna Gittel is married to the Vialopola rebbe of Flatbush, Brooklyn.

== Biography ==
Horowitz received rabbinical ordination at Beth Medrash Gevoha in Lakewood, New Jersey and Tchebin Yeshiva of Jerusalem, Israel. He married Shayndle Weiss and in 1980 went to Boston to become the rabbi of Congregation Beth Pinchas in Brookline. Congregation Beth Pinchas is part of the New England Chassidic Center, an umbrella organization providing religious and community services throughout the Boston area.
