= Har Nof =

Neighborhood in Jerusalem

Coordinates: 31°47′05″N 35°10′30″E

Har Nof הר נוף
- Neighborhood of Jerusalem
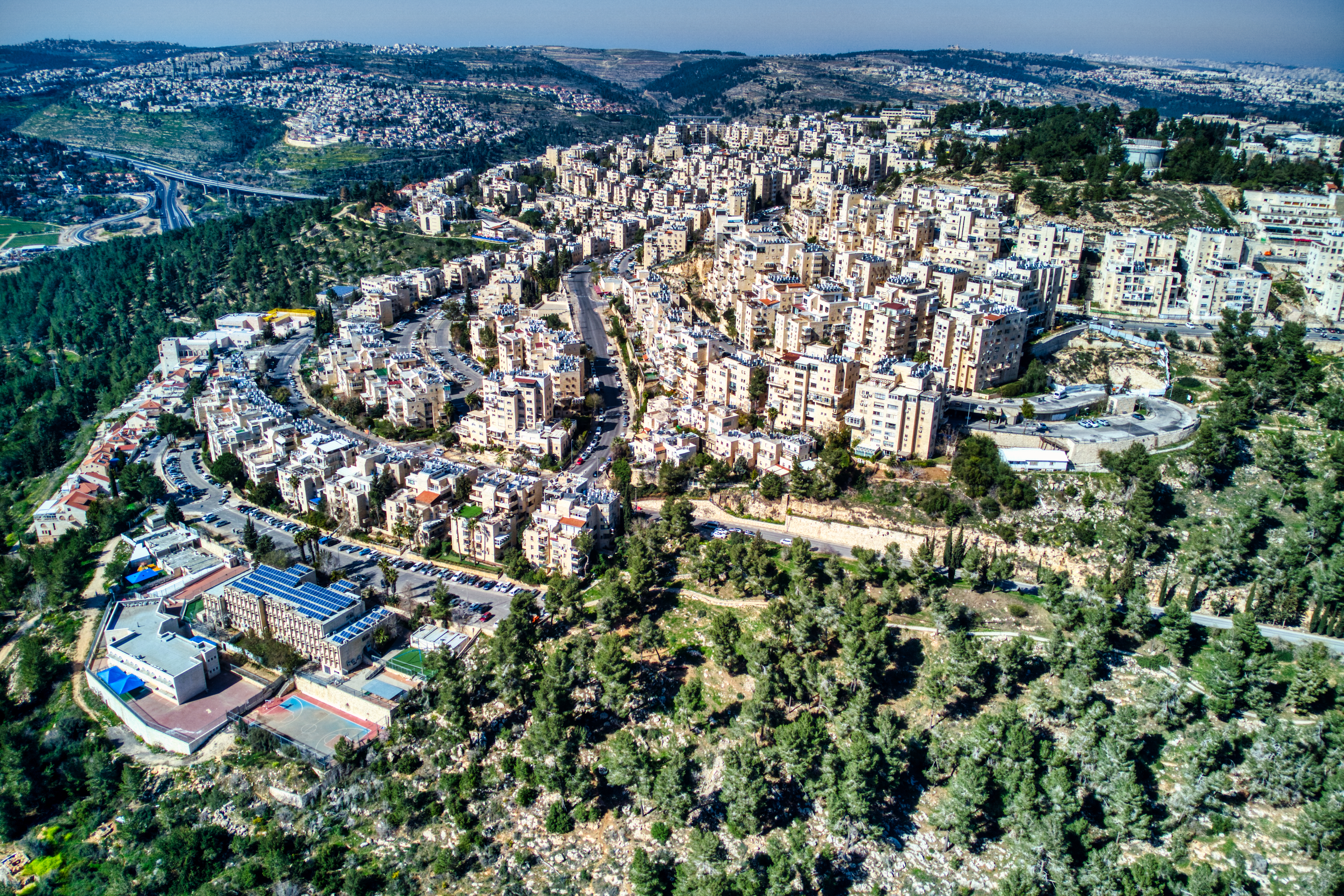
- View of Har Nof
- Interactive map of Har Nof
- Country: Israel
- District: Jerusalem
- City: Jerusalem

Population
  - Total: 20,000

Har Nof (Hebrew: הר נוף, lit. 'Scenic Mountain') is a neighborhood on a hillside on the western boundary of Jerusalem with a population of 20,000 residents, predominantly Orthodox Jews.

== History ==
In Talmudic times, Har Nof was an agricultural settlement that served Jerusalem. Remains of ancient wine presses, farmhouses, and terraces built 1,500 years ago have been unearthed on the outskirts of Har Nof.

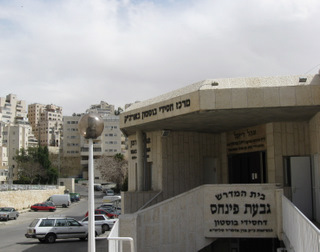
The entrance to the Boston Shul in Har Nof.

The neighbourhood, originally designated for young couples and both secular and religious homebuyers, was established in the 1980s on and near the ruins of the Palestinian village of Deir Yassin, whose residents had been massacred by the Irgun and Lehi in 1948. The name of the neighbourhood was chosen in 1979 following a public competition in which the public was invited to suggest names. Construction began in 1980 under the design of architect Ze'ev Sheinberg. In 1983, the Jerusalem Municipality initiated the construction of public institutions in the neighbourhood, including classrooms and kindergartens. However, the neighbourhood's occupancy was delayed due to prolonged work on connecting it to the electricity grid, paving roads, and developing public spaces. In 1984, the Bostoner Rebbe, Grand Rabbi Levi Yitzchok Horowitz, decided to establish a center in Har Nof in Jerusalem, which was instrumental in building up the neighbourhood's Orthodox community.

The neighbourhood began to be populated in 1985 as a mixed community of secular, religious, and ultra-Orthodox residents. In 1988, a residential building under construction collapsed, and after a municipal inspection, two additional buildings were declared dangerous due to structural defects.

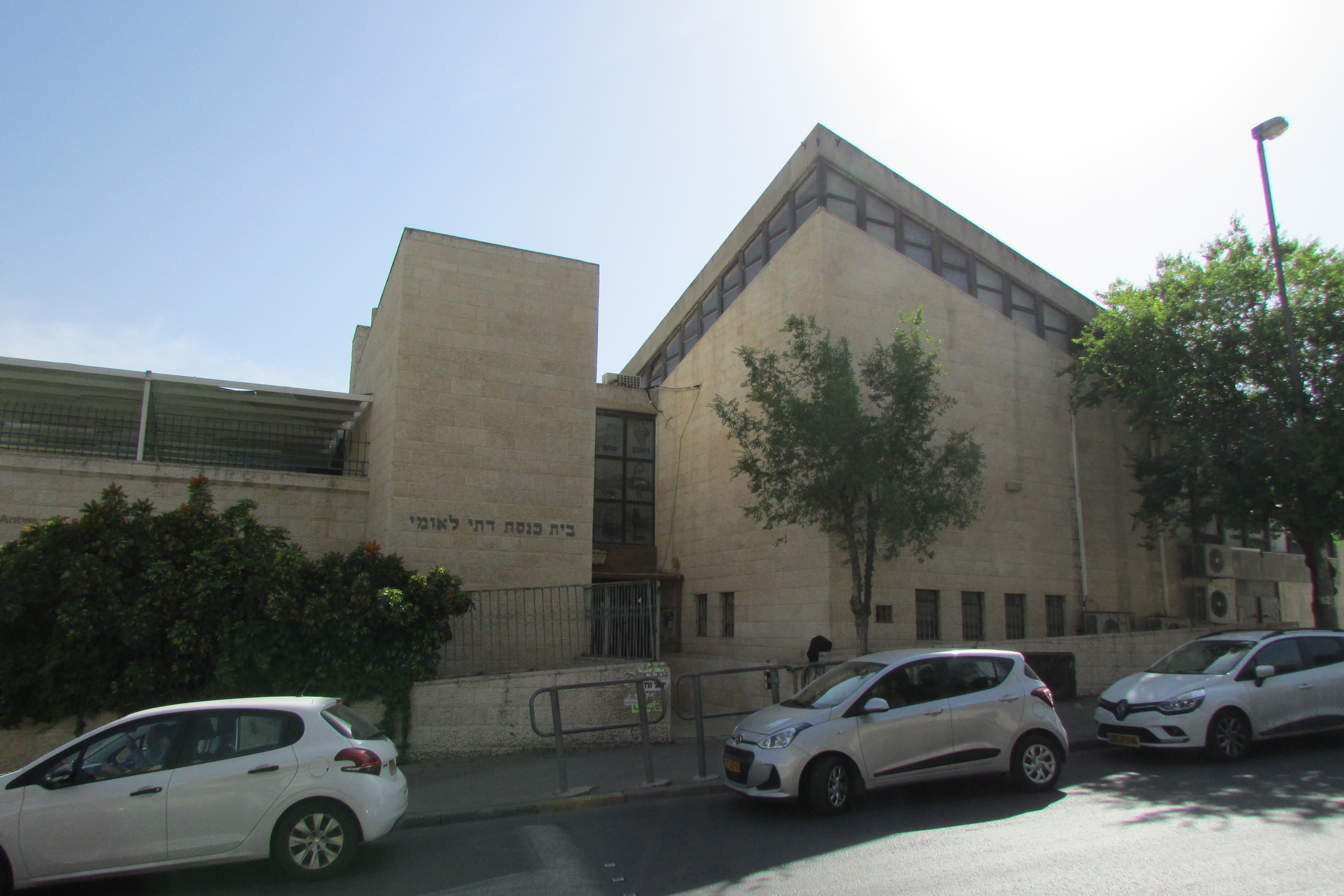
Dati Leumi synagogue, Har Nof

In 1989, conflicts broke out between Haredi and secular residents over the Haredi demand to close the neighbourhood's streets to vehicular traffic on Shabbat. Over time, the neighbourhood became a stronghold of the Shas party, especially after Aryeh Deri, his brother Rabbi Yehuda Deri, and later Rabbi Ovadia Yosef moved there. As a result, the neighbourhood underwent a process of increasing Haredi dominance. In 2002, the Maor Yisrael association, led by Ovadia Yosef's son Moshe, built a yeshiva and dormitory on a 70-dunam plot in the neighbourhood, along with 200 housing units.

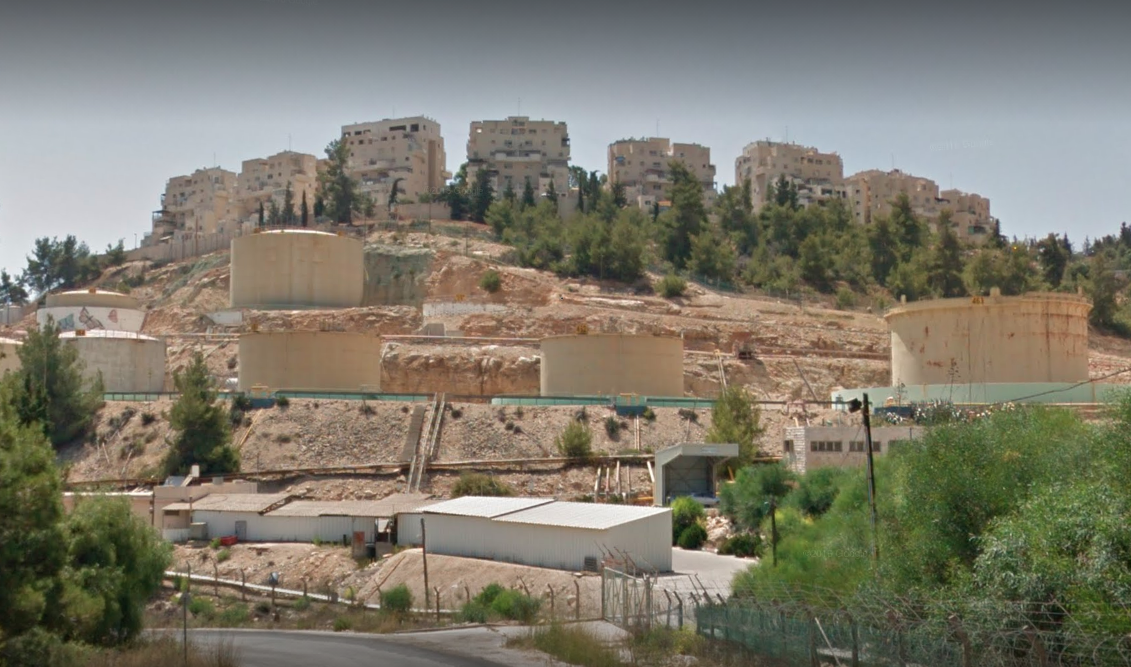
Pi Glilot Fuel Terminal

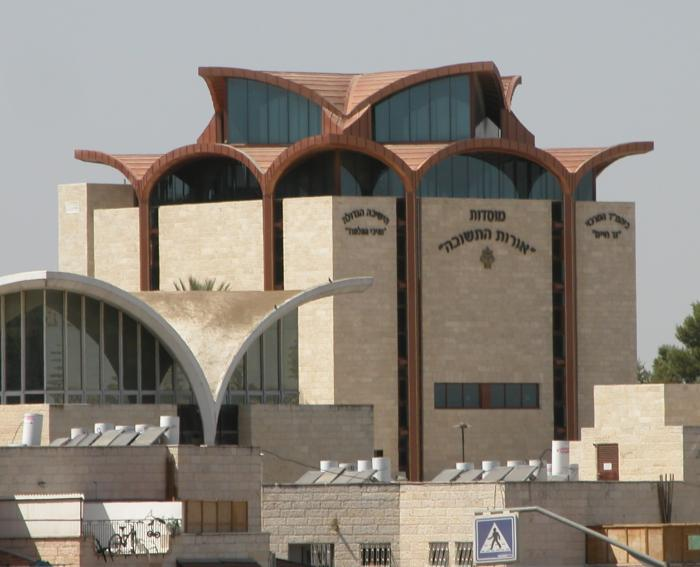
Orot Hateshuvah Yeshiva.

Bet Midrash lehalacha behityashvut.

In 1998, plans were initiated to expand the neighbourhood southward by relocating the Pi Glilot fuel terminal and developing the land, including parts of the Jerusalem Forest. The terminal, built in the late 1960s, supplied fuel to the Jerusalem area through an underground pipeline from Pi Glilot in northern Tel Aviv. In 2001, the Jerusalem Local Planning and Building Committee recommended approving a plan for 1,000 high-density housing units and relocating the fuel facilities underground in the nearby Nahal Revida. However, in 2007, the Jerusalem District Planning Committee decided not to rezone the land for residential use until a replacement site for the fuel terminal was found. In 2009, Delek Group, which had purchased Pi Glilot, sought to vacate the terminal and sell the land for 200 million sheqels, but the site remained in operation. Since 2018, the Israel Land Authority has been promoting a new plan for the area, including 2,300 housing units on 648 dunams, partly at the expense of the Jerusalem Forest.

In 2014, a plan was approved for a light rail branch line to the neighbourhood, approximately 2 km long, running from Ben Dor Junction on Herzl Boulevard along Kanfei Nesharim Street to the Har Nof transport terminal. Initially planned as a branch of the Jerusalem Light Rail's Red Line, it was later integrated into the Green Line plan.

In 2022, Highway 16 opened, making an additional entrance to Jerusalem connecting the Motza Interchange on Highway 1 to Har Nof through a 1.5 km tunnel. The neighbourhood is linked to the highway via the Nahal Revida Interchange.

In October 2019, Jerusalem Mayor Moshe Lion announced the renaming of Har Nof to "Neot Yosef" in memory of Rabbi Ovadia Yosef. However, in July 2020, the municipality decided to abandon the renaming plan after receiving approximately 1,200 objections.

== Geography ==
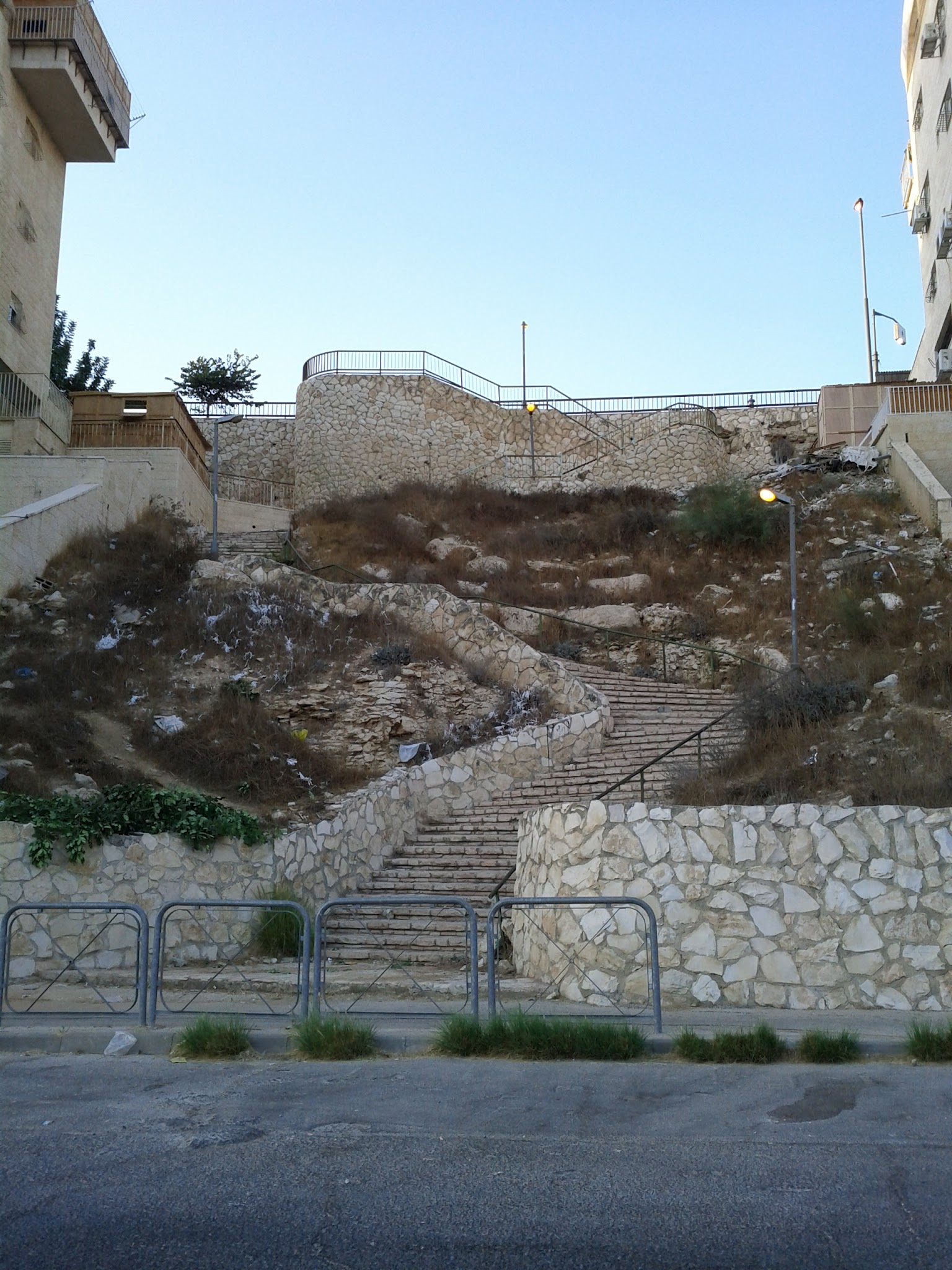
Steps in Har Nof

Har Nof is a terraced neighborhood on the slopes of a mountain that sits 813 meters (2667 feet) above sea level. Due to the topography, many of the multi-storey apartment buildings have entrances on both sides of the building – one to reach the lower floors, and another to reach the higher floors. Some streets are connected by long flights of stairs. At the foot of Har Nof lies the 1,200 dunam Jerusalem Forest (Yaar Yerushalayim), planted in the 1950s as a green lung around the city.

== Demography ==
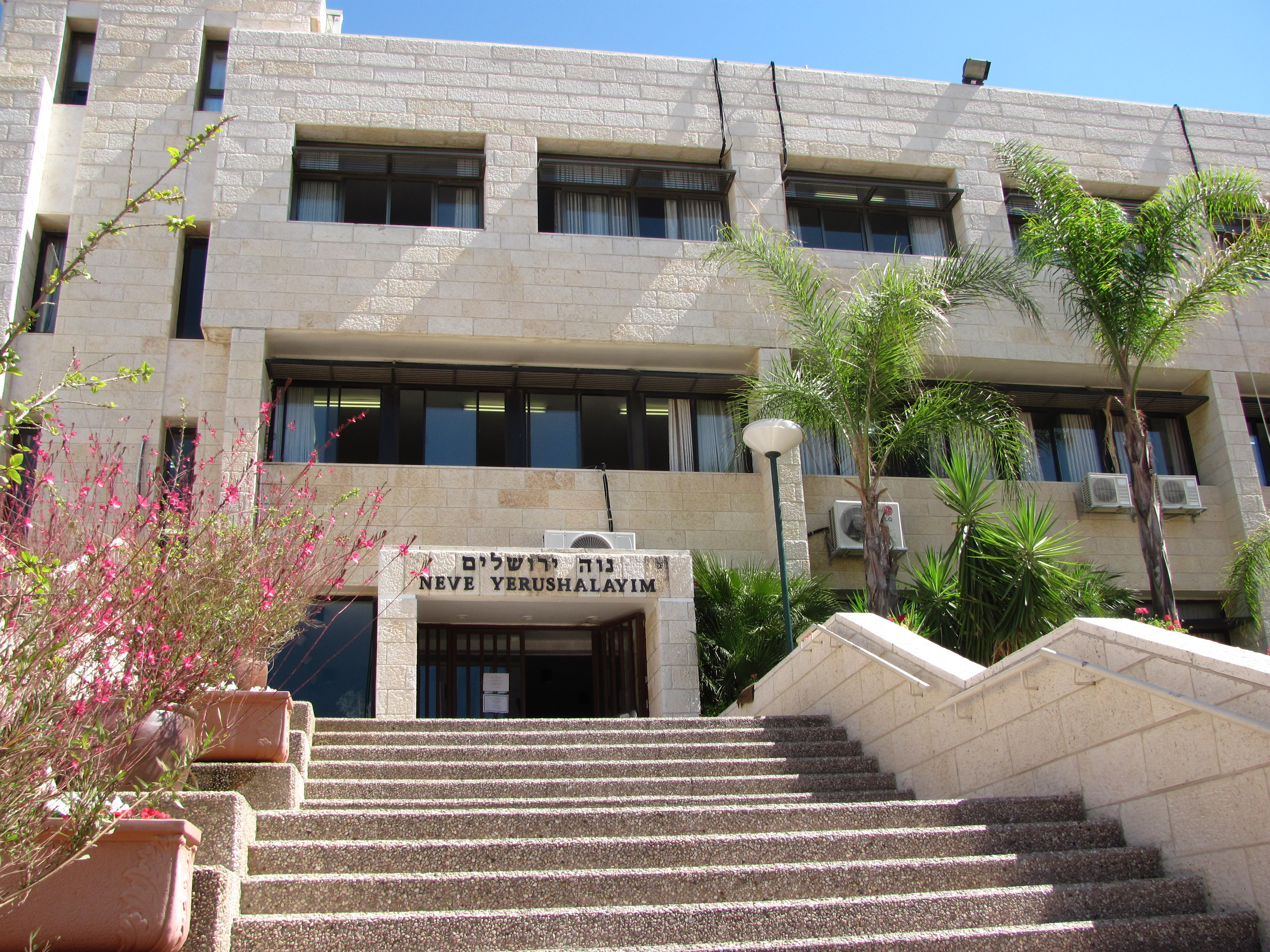
Neve Yerushalayim academy for women

The majority of the residents of Har Nof are Orthodox Jews, both Haredi and Dati Leumi. Many residents are olim (immigrants). The neighborhood has a large community of English-speaking olim, and notable French-speaking and Spanish-speaking communities. There are also communities of Ger and Vizhnitz Hasidim, as well many Sephardi and Mizrahi Jews. The former Sefardic chief rabbi and leader of the Shas party, Rabbi Ovadia Yosef, lived in Har Nof. Spiritual leaders of the Ashkenazi Haredi community who reside in Har Nof are Rabbi Moishe Sternbuch of the Edah HaChareidis; the Bostoner Rebbe, Rabbi Mayer Alter Horowitz of Congregation Givat Pinchas (The Boston Shul); Rabbi Beryl Gershenfeld, Rosh Yeshiva of Har Nof's Machon Yaakov and Machon Shlomo yeshivas; and Rabbi Yitzchak Mordechai Rubin of Kehilat Bnei Torah.

== Synagogues and public institutions ==
Rabbi David Yosef is the head of the Yechaveh Da'at Kollel and the chief rabbi of Har Nof. Har Nof has a large number of synagogues, yeshivas, and Torah study institutions, among them are: Imrei Shefer, Boston Shul, Kehilat Zichron Yosef, Heichal Hatorah, Yeshiva Pachad Yitzchok, Machon Shlomo, Yeshivat Lev Aharon, and Machon Yaakov. The campuses of Neve Yerushalayim and She'arim College of Jewish Studies for Women are located in Har Nof, as is Yechaveh Da'at, Rabbi Ovadia Yosef's synagogue and spiritual headquarters.

On 18 November 2014, an attack occurred at the Kehilat Bnei Torah synagogue. Two Arab terrorists from East Jerusalem entered the synagogue with knives, a meat cleaver, and a pistol, inflicting heavy wounds on their victims who were at morning prayers, killing five and injuring eight - four of them seriously. In the ensuing gun battle, the two attackers were shot dead, and one of the policemen who attended the scene, a Druze, later died of his wounds.

== Yeshivas ==
=== Derech Etz Chaim ===
Derech Etz Chaim (DEC) is a post-high school religious yeshiva located in Har Nof. It was designed for students to spend a year or more studying Torah after completing their high school studies and before embarking to university studies. Studies focus primarily on the study of Talmud, and are intended to give students the ability and confidence to carry on learning Torah independently after leaving DEC.

DEC was founded in 1998 by Rav Aharon Katz, who received semicha (rabbinic ordination) from both R' Yaakov Weinberg and R' Moshe Halberstam. DEC is affiliated with the Jewish Agency’s MASA Program

The daily schedule is divided into three major study segments: Morning seder is devoted to Iyun [in depth study] of Talmud, followed by a lecture. The afternoon is devoted to Bikiyus [basic understanding of text] including group review and with the expectation of covering large amounts of material. Evenings are open study as per the students choice. Classes are offered on a variety of subjects including Chumash, Halacha, Machshava, Parshat Hashavua, Sefer Hachinuch, and Mussar.

The DEC facility is a four-story villa containing the dormitory, dining room, weight room, lounge areas, Beit Medrash and Shiur rooms. Each floor has views overlooking the Jerusalem Forest. Shabbos and Yom Tov meals take place in Yeshiva twice a month. DEC participates annually in the American Flag Football League in Israel each fall/winter. In 2009, Derech Etz Chaim became the Flag Football Champions of the AFI league. During the year program the school provides a number of trips around Israel.

== Transportation ==
The neighborhood is linked to the city center by Kanfei Nesharim and Beit Hadfus Streets, with a number of bus lines providing public transportation.

== Communal activism ==
The residents of Har Nof founded Shomera, a non-profit environmental protection association to thwart the building of high-rise luxury towers that would block the view of the Jerusalem Forest. Emergency medical care in Har Nof is provided by the volunteer group Hachovesh. Em Habanim is a volunteer organization founded in 1995 by Malka Yarom, a Har Nof resident who opened her home to religious divorcees who had nowhere to take their children on the Sabbath. The organization now has a membership of 300, and offers support to single-parent families in the Orthodox Jewish sector.

== Notable people ==
- Baruch Chait (born 1946), rosh yeshiva, author and musician
- Aryeh Deri (born 1959), Shas politician, relocated to Bayit VeGan neighborhood
- Beatie Deutsch (née Rabin; born 1989), ultra-Orthodox marathon runner
- Ovadia Yosef (1920 – 2013), Talmudic scholar, posek, Sephardic Chief Rabbi of Israel (1973 – 1983) and spiritual leader of the Shas party
- David Yosef (1957-) - Current Sepharic chief rabbi of Israel.
