= Beitar Illit =

Illegal Israeli settlement in the West Bank

Coordinates: 31°41′52″N 35°6′56″E

Beitar Illit: בֵּיתָר עִלִּית; بيتار عيليت
- City (from 1985)

Hebrew transcription(s)
  - ISO 259: Beitar ʕillit
  - Also spelled: Betar Illit (official)
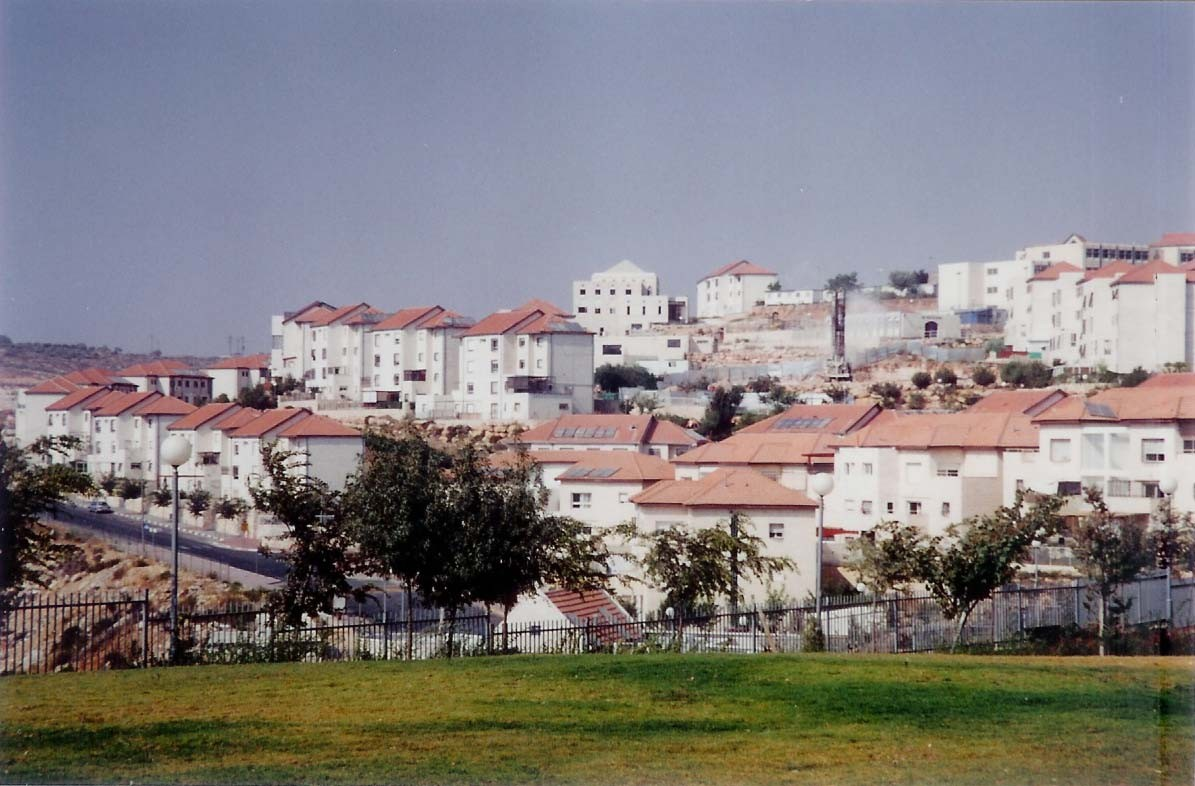

- Interactive map of Beitar Illit
- Location within the West Bank
- Region: West Bank
- Founded: 1985

Government
  - Mayor: Meir Rubenstein

Area
  - Total: 4,300 dunams (4.3 km^{2}; 1.7 sq mi)

Population (2024)
  - Total: 71,697
  - Density: 17,000/km^{2} (43,000/sq mi)
- Website: betar-illit.muni.il

Beitar Illit (Hebrew: בֵּיתָר עִלִּית; officially Betar Illit; Arabic: بيتار عيليت) is a Haredi Jewish-Israeli settlement organized as a city council in the Gush Etzion settlement bloc, ten kilometres (6 mi) southwest of Jerusalem in the West Bank. Beitar Illit is one of Israel's largest and most rapidly growing settlements, and in 2024 had a population of 71,697.

The international community considers Israeli settlements in the West Bank illegal under international law, but the Israeli government disputes this.

== Etymology ==
Beitar Illit (lit. Upper Beitar) is named after the ancient Jewish fortress city of Betar, whose ruins (known as Khirbet el-Yahud, Arabic for "Ruin of the Jews") lie one kilometre (1/2 mi) away, near the Palestinian village of Battir, which preserves the ancient name.

== History ==
According to the ARIJ, Beitar Illit was established in 1985 on land which Israel had confiscated from two nearby Palestinian villages: 3,140 dunams from Husan and 1,166 dunams from Nahalin.

It was established by a small group of young families from the religious Zionist yeshiva of Machon Meir. The first residents settled in 1990. As Beitar Illit began to grow, an influx of Haredi Jewish Bobover families came to predominate, while the original group moved on. The city is now home to many Hasidic groups, including Bobov, Boston, Boyan, Breslov, Karlin-Stolin and Slonim.

== Geography ==
Beitar Illit lies in the northern Judean Hills at about 700 m above sea level. It is located just west of the intersection of Route 60, the north–south artery which roughly follows the watershed from Nazareth through Jerusalem to Beersheba, and Route 375, which descends west into the Elah Valley to the coastal plain and Tel Aviv area. It takes about 10 minutes to get to Jerusalem; Tel Aviv is around 60 minutes away. Beitar Illit is connected to West Jerusalem by the Tunnels Highway, which passes directly underneath the Arab town of Beit Jala and allows access to Jerusalem without coming within view of Arabs.

== Demographics ==
=== Numbers ===
Historical population
Year	Pop.	±% p.a.
1995	5,500	—
2008	32,900	+14.75%
2013	44,900	+6.42%
2018	56,750	+4.80%
2022	64,016	+3.06%
2025	72,682	+4.32%

At the end of 2003, the population was 23,000 and in 2006 it was 29,100. According to statistics from the Ministry of the Interior, the population in January 2007 was 35,000, an increase of 20% over one year. A Ministry of Interior report from July 2013 placed the population at 45,710.

With an annual birth rate of 1,800 births, Beitar Illit has the fastest population growth among the West Bank settlements. Approximately 63 percent of the population is under the age of 18, which is the highest percentage of children in any Israeli settlement or city.

=== Character ===
The population of Beitar Illit is 100% Haredi. Approximately 50% of the population is Hasidic.

An estimated 10 percent of the population is English-speaking. There are three English-speaking synagogues, two English-speaking kollels (one for retirees), and an English-speaking women's group.

As of 2010, all incoming residents used to be screened by an acceptance committee. In common with many other Israeli towns, (68% of Israeli towns bar Arabs), Beitar Illit practices apartheid and does not allow Arabs to live in the town. Town admission committees reject prospective residents that are deemed unsuitable and so legally enforce segregation between Jews and Arabs.

== Education ==
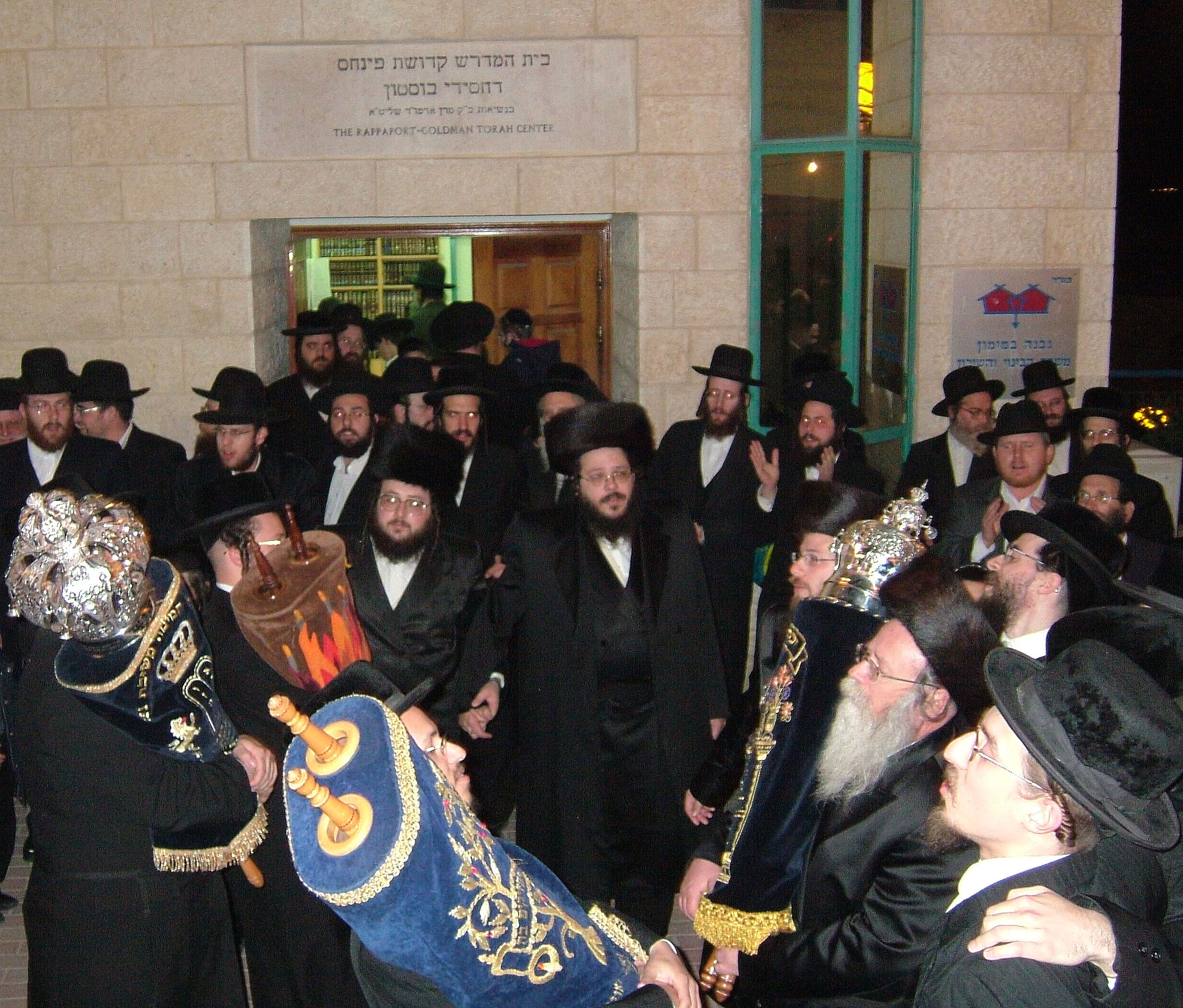
Hachnasat Sefer Torah to the Boston synagogue in Beitar Illit.

As the population of Beitar Illit is Haredi, the schools are all Haredi schools. The city has close to 20,000 schoolchildren. Of these, approximately 6,000 are enrolled in the city's 225 preschools and daycare centers. Elementary school-age boys attend the city's 27 Talmud Torahs, and elementary school-age girls attend 18 elementary schools. Secondary education includes 21 yeshivas for boys and 11 high schools and post-high schools for girls. Married adult men study in 75 kollels.

== Employment ==
A significant number of men work, mostly at home or in Jerusalem. Women are employed by local business process outsourcing companies that accommodate the Haredi lifestyle. In 2010, it was reported that 64.3% of working-age men and 45.8% of working-age women in Beitar Illit were unemployed.

== Culture ==
One hundred and forty synagogues and 15 mikvehs serve the population.

== Awards ==
Beitar Illit has been awarded the Israel Ministry of Interior's gold prize, recognizing "responsible management and sustainable urban planning", for eight years running. In 2002, it received the Ministry of Interior's prize for water conservation in public gardens, urban public institutions, and urban water administration. The municipal welfare department was awarded a prize and recognized by the national government as an "outstanding department" for its work in preventing teen dropouts.

The city is well known for its landscaping and general cleanliness. There are 94 parks and hundreds of playgrounds in the city. From 2000 to 2013, Beitar Illit earned five out of five stars in the Council for a Beautiful Israel's annual "Beautiful Town in a Beautiful Israel" contest, which recognizes a city's investment in environment, aesthetics, and maintenance of appearance and cleanliness. In 2005 the city won the Council for a Beautiful Israel's "Beauty Flag", which is awarded every five years.

== Pollution ==
Since about 2000 Beitar Illit has been dumping raw sewage and waste water on neighboring areas. Residents of Nahalin have reported the contamination of a water spring and the destruction of agricultural areas due to this environmental damage.

== Voting Patterns ==
In the 2022 election, 99 percent of voters in Beitar Illit voted for the parties of the right-wing coalition led by Benjamin Netanyahu, while 0.3 percent voted for the parties of the center-left coalition led by Yair Lapid and 0.01 percent voted for the Arab parties. 90 percent of voters voted for the Haredi parties Shas or UTJ.

In the 2026 election, 98 percent of voters in Beitar Illit voted for the parties of the right-wing coalition led by Benjamin Netanyahu, while 0.4 percent voted for the parties of the center-left coalition led by Gadi Eisenkot and 0.01 percent voted for the Arab parties. 86 percent of voters voted for the Haredi parties Shas or UTJ. Voter turnout increased 18 percent from the 2022 election.

== Status under international law ==
Like all settlements in the Israeli-occupied territories, Beitar Illit is considered illegal under international law. The international community considers Israeli settlements to violate the Fourth Geneva Convention's prohibition on the transfer of an occupying power's civilian population into occupied territory. The Israeli government disputes that the Fourth Geneva Convention applies to the Palestinian territories as they had not been legally held by a sovereign prior to Israel taking control of them. This view has been rejected by the International Court of Justice and the International Committee of the Red Cross.

== Controversies ==
At an international conference in Karlsruhe in November 2010, Jawad Hasan claimed that sewage and urban runoff from Beitar Illit have contaminated the local hydrological system. The Palestinian Authority claims that sewage flows into neighboring Palestinian fields and orchards. Farmers from Wadi Fukin have complained that since the establishment of Beitar Illit in 1985, 11 natural wells have gone dry and they have suffered from overflow from the settlement's backed up sewers. The Israeli government has ordered Beitar Illit to address these sewage problems.

In 2010, the Israeli interior ministry announced plans to build 112 new apartments during a visit by U.S. vice-president Joe Biden, leading to widespread news coverage that embarrassed the American government.

Beitar Illit was one of four cities named in a petition to the Israeli High Court in December 2010 alleging a pattern of discrimination against Sephardi girls in the local Haredi schools. A Beitar Illit spokesman denied the charges, stating that the percentage of Sephardi girls in the school matched the percentage of Sephardim in the settlement.

In 2023, the Mayor of Beitar Illit prohibited the entry of Arabs (including Israeli citizens) into the settlement on buses.

Beitar Illit was named as one of the illegal settlements promoted by a British charity in the U.K. during a 2026 event investigated by the charity regulator. The complaint by the ICJP alleged " unlawful transfer of civilian populations into occupied territory".

== Notable residents ==
- Moshe Shimon Horowitz, Bostoner Rav of Beitar Illit
- Sinai Moshkovitz, Shotz–Beitar Rav
- Rivka Ravitz, chief of staff to President of Israel Reuven Rivlin

== See also ==
- List of Israeli settlements with city status in the West Bank
