= Sh'erit ha-Pletah =

Holocaust survivors living in Displaced Persons camps

Sh'erit ha-Pletah (Hebrew: שארית הפליטה, romanized: Sh'erit ha-Pletah, meaning surviving remnant) is a Hebrew term from the Book of Ezra and 1 Chronicles (see Ezra 9:14; 1 Chr 4:43) for more than 250,000 Jewish Holocaust survivors living in Displaced Persons (DP) camps after the end of the Holocaust and Second World War, and the organisations they created to act on their behalf with the Allied authorities. These were active between 27 May 1945 and 1950–51, when the last DP camps closed.

A total of more than 250,000 Jewish survivors spent several years following their liberation in DP camps or communities in Germany, Austria, and Italy, since they could not, or would not, be repatriated to their countries of origin. For many of the survivors, Europe had become "a vast cemetery of the Jewish people" and "they wanted to start life over and build a new national Jewish homeland in Eretz Yisrael". Some of those who returned to their countries of origin, for example Poland, were murdered in pogroms upon arrival, such as the 1946 Kielce pogrom in which 42 Jewish Holocaust survivors were murdered upon return to their home towns, an event which accelerated Jewish migration to Eretz Yisrael. The United States imposed stricter immigration quotas in order to prevent them immigrating, while Britain continued to try to prevent them migrating to Palestine, sending more than 50,000 Jewish refugees to DP camps on Cyprus, such as the SS Exodus in 1947.

In time, the refugees became socially and politically organized, advocating at first for their political and human rights in the camps, and then for the right to emigrate to the countries of their choice, preferably British-ruled Mandatory Palestine, the US and Canada. Organised groups such as Bricha were formed by Jews in Palestine in order to facilitate the emigration of European Jews from Displaced Persons camps to Palestine.

With the exception of 10,000–15,000 who chose to make their homes in Germany after the war (see Central Council of Jews in Germany), by 1952 the vast majority of the Jewish DPs ultimately left the camps and settled elsewhere. About 136,000 settled in Israel with the assistance of organised underground efforts by Jewish groups such as the Bricha, 80,000 in the United States, and another 20,000 in other nations, including Canada and South Africa.

== Formation of the DP camps ==
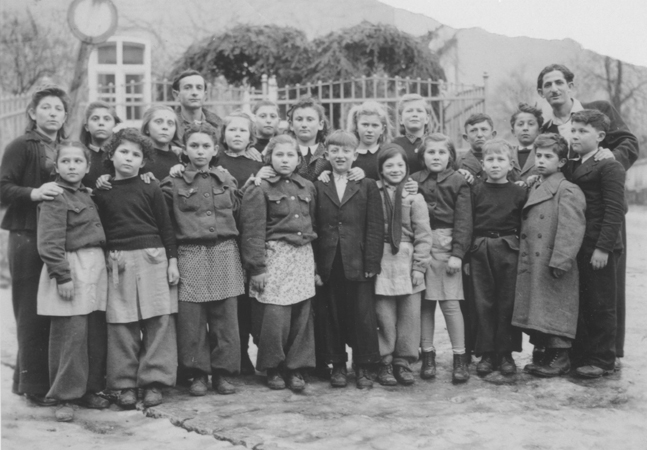
School children at Schauenstein DP camp in 1946

In an effort to destroy the evidence of war crimes, Nazi authorities and military staff accelerated the pace of killings, forced victims on death marches, and attempted to deport many of them away from the rapidly shrinking German front lines. As the German war effort collapsed, survivors were typically left on their own, on trains, by the sides of roads, and in camps. Concentration and death camps were liberated by Allied forces in the final stages of the war, beginning with Majdanek, in July 1944, and Auschwitz, in January 1945; Buchenwald, Bergen-Belsen, Dachau, Mauthausen, and other camps were liberated in April and May 1945.

At the time of Germany's unconditional surrender on 7 May 1945 there were some 6.5 to 7 million displaced persons in the Allied occupation zones, among them an estimated 55,000 to 60,000 Jews. The vast majority of non-Jewish DPs were repatriated in a matter of months. The number of Jewish DPs, however, subsequently grew manyfold as Jewish refugees from Eastern Europe and Soviet occupation zone migrated westward. It is estimated that a total of more than 250,000 Jewish DPs resided in camps or communities in Germany, Austria, and Italy during the period from 1945 to 1952.

In the first weeks after liberation, Allied military forces improvised relief in the form of shelter, food, and medical care. A large number of refugees were in critical condition as a result of malnutrition, abuse, and disease. Many died, but medical material was requisitioned from military stores and German civilian facilities. Military doctors as well as physicians among the survivors themselves used available resources to help a large number recover their physical health. The first proper funerals of Holocaust victims took place during this period with the assistance of Allied forces and military clergy.

Accommodations for refugees of various origins were established on sites that had previously served as barracks, labor camps, hotels, hospitals, schools, apartment buildings, and private homes.

As Germany and Austria came under Allied military administration, the commanders assumed responsibility for the safety and disposition of all displaced persons. The Allies provided for the DPs according to nationality, and initially did not recognize Jews as constituting a separate group. One significant consequence of this early perspective was that Jewish DPs sometimes found themselves housed in the same quarters with former Nazi collaborators. Also, the general policy of the Allied occupation forces was to repatriate DPs to their country of origin as soon as possible, and there was not necessarily sufficient consideration for exceptions; repatriation policy varied from place to place, but Jewish DPs, for whom repatriation was problematic, were apt to find themselves under pressure to return home.

General George Patton, the commander of the United States Third Army and military governor of Bavaria, where most of the Jewish DPs resided, was known for pursuing a harsh, indiscriminate repatriation policy. However, his approach raised objections from the refugees themselves, as well as from American military and civilian parties sympathetic to their plight. In early July 1945, Patton issued a directive that the entire Munich area was to be cleared of displaced persons with an eye toward repatriating them. Joseph Dunner, an American officer who in civilian life was a professor of political science, sent a memorandum to military authorities protesting the order. When 90 trucks of the Third Army arrived at Buchberg to transport the refugees there, they refused to move, citing Dunner's memo. Based on these efforts and blatant antisemitic remarks, Patton was relieved of this command.

== Harrison report ==
By June 1945 reports had circulated back in the United States concerning overcrowded conditions and insufficient supplies in the DP camps, as well as the ill treatment of Jewish survivors at the hand of the U.S. Army. American Jewish leaders, in particular, felt compelled to act. American Earl G. Harrison was sent by president Truman to investigate conditions among the "non-repatriables" in the DP camps. Arriving in Germany in July, he spent several weeks visiting the camps and submitted his final report on 24 August. Harrison's report stated among other things that:

Generally speaking... many Jewish displaced persons and other possibly non-repatriables are living under guard behind barbed-wire fences, in camps of several descriptions (built by the Germans for slave-laborers and Jews), including some of the most notorious of the concentration camps, amidst crowded, frequently unsanitary and generally grim conditions, in complete idleness, with no opportunity, except surreptitiously, to communicate with the outside world, waiting, hoping for some word of encouragement and action in their behalf....
...While there has been marked improvement in the health of survivors of the Nazi starvation and persecution program, there are many pathetic malnutrition cases both among the hospitalized and in the general population of the camps... at many of the camps and centers including those where serious starvation cases are, there is a marked and serious lack of needed medical supplies...
...many of the Jewish displaced persons, late in July, had no clothing other than their concentration camp garb-a rather hideous striped pajama effect-while others, to their chagrin, were obliged to wear German S.S. uniforms. It is questionable which clothing they hate the more...
...Most of the very little which has been done [to reunite families] has been informal action by the displaced persons themselves with the aid of devoted Army Chaplains, frequently Rabbis, and the American Joint Distribution Committee...
...The first and plainest need of these people is a recognition of their actual status and by this I mean their status as Jews... While admittedly it is not normally desirable to set aside particular racial or religious groups from their nationality categories, the plain truth is that this was done for so long by the Nazis that a group has been created which has special needs...
...Their desire to leave Germany is an urgent one.... They want to be evacuated to Palestine now, just as other national groups are being repatriated to their homes... Palestine, while clearly the choice of most, is not the only named place of possible emigration. Some, but the number is not large, wish to emigrate to the United States where they have relatives, others to England, the British Dominions, or to South America...
...No other single matter is, therefore, so important from the viewpoint of Jews in Germany and Austria and those elsewhere who have known the horrors of the concentration camps as is the disposition of the Palestine question...
...As matters now stand, we appear to be treating the Jews as the Nazis treated them except that we do not exterminate them. They are in concentration camps in large numbers under our military guard instead of S.S. troops.

Harrison's report was met with consternation in Washington, and its contrast with Patton's position ultimately contributed to Patton being relieved of his command in Germany in September 1945.

== Growth of the camps ==
The number of refugees in the DP camps continued to grow as displaced Jews who were in Western Europe at war's end were joined by hundreds of thousands of refugees from Eastern Europe. Many of these were Polish Jews who had initially been repatriated. Nearly 90% of the approximately 200,000 Polish Jews who had survived the war in the Soviet Union chose to return to Poland under the Soviet-Polish repatriation agreements. But Jews returning to their erstwhile homes in Poland met with a generally hostile reception from their non-Jewish neighbors. Between fall 1944 and summer 1946 as many as 600 Jews were killed in anti-Jewish riots in various towns and cities, including incidents in Kraków, around August 20, 1945; Sosnowiec, on October 25; and Lublin, on November 19. Most notable was the pogrom in Kielce on July 4, 1946, in which 42 Jews were killed. In the course of 1946 the flight of Jewish refugees from Eastern Europe toward the West amounted to a mass exodus that swelled the ranks of DPs in Germany and Austria, especially in the U.S. Zone.

Although hundreds of DP camps were in operation between 1945 and 1948, the refugees were mostly segregated, with several camps being dedicated to Jews. These camps varied in terms of the conditions afforded to the refugees, how they were managed, and the composition of their population.

In the American sector, the Jewish community across many camps organized itself rapidly for purposes of representation and advocacy. In the British sector, most refugees were concentrated in the Bergen-Belsen displaced persons camp and were under tighter control.

== Humanitarian services in the DP camps ==
The Allies had begun to prepare for the humanitarian aftermath of the war while it was still going on, with the founding of the United Nations Relief and Rehabilitation Administration (UNRRA), on 9 November 1943. However, the beginnings of the agency were plagued by organizational problems and corruption. The military authorities were, in any case, reluctant to yield significant responsibility for the DP assembly centers to a civilian organization, until it became clear that there would be a need to house and care for the DPs for an extended period of time. At the point when it was supposed to begin its work the UNRRA was woefully understaffed in view of the larger than expected numbers of DPs, and additional staff that were hastily recruited were poorly trained. The agency began to send staff into the field in summer 1945; its mission had been conceived mainly as a support to the repatriation process, including providing medical services, and assuring the delivery of adequate nutrition, as well as attending to the DPs' needs for comfort and entertainment; however, it often fell short of fulfilling these functions. As of 15 November 1945, the UNRRA officially assumed responsibility for the administration of the camps, while remaining generally subordinate to the military, which continued to provide for housing and security in the camps, as well as the delivery of food, clothing, and medical supplies. Over time the UNRRA supplemented the latter basic services with health and welfare services, recreational facilities, self-help programs, and vocational guidance.

By the time that the UNRRA took the reins of administration of the camps, the Jewish DPs had already begun to elect their own representatives, and were vocal about their desire for self-governance. However, since camp committees did not yet have any officially sanctioned role, their degree of power and influence depended at first on the stance of the particular UNRRA director at the given camp.

The UNRRA was active mainly through the end of 1946 and had wound down its operations by mid 1947. In late 1947 a new successor organization, the International Refugee Organization (IRO) absorbed some of the UNRRA staff and assumed its responsibilities, but with a focus turned toward resettlement, as well as care of the most vulnerable DPs, rather than repatriation.

A number of other organizations played an active role in the emerging Jewish community in the DP camps. The American Jewish Joint Distribution Committee ("Joint") provided financial support and supplies from American sources; in the British sector, the Jewish Relief Unit acted as the British equivalent to the Joint; and the ORT established numerous vocational and other training.

== From representation to autonomy ==
The refugees who found themselves in provisional, sparse quarters under military guard soon spoke up against the ironic nature of their liberation, invoking an oft-repeated slogan "From Dachau to Feldafing." Working committees were established in each camp, and on July 1, 1945, the committees met for a founding session of a federation for Jewish DP camp committees in Feldafing. The session also included representatives of the Jewish Brigade and the Allied military administration. It resulted in the formation of a provisional council and an executive committee chaired by Zalman Grinberg. Patton's attempt at repatriating Jewish refugees had resulted in a resolve within the Sh'erit ha-Pletah to define their own destiny. The various camp committees convened a General Jewish Survivors’ Conference a conference for the entire Sh'erit ha-Pletah at the St. Ottilien camp attended by delegates representing Holocaust survivors from forty-six Displaced Persons camps in both the American and the British Zones of Occupied Germany and Austria. The delegates passed a fourteen-point program that established a broad mandate, including the establishment of a Jewish state in Palestine with UN recognition, compensation to victims, participation in the trials against Nazi war criminals, archival of historical records, and full autonomy for the committees. However, the survivor organizations in the American and British Zones remain separate after the conference and the American and British sectors developed independent organization structures.

The center for the British sector in Germany was at the Bergen-Belsen DP camp, where Josef Rosensaft had been the primus motor for establishing what became the Central Committee for Displaced Persons in the British zone. In the American sector, Zalman Grinberg and Samuel Gringauz and others led the formation of the Central Committee of the Liberated Jews, which was to establish offices first in the former Deutsches Museum and then in Siebertstrasse 3 in Munich.

The central organizations for Jewish refugees had an overwhelming number of issues to resolve, among them:

- Ensuring healthy and dignified living conditions for the refugees living in various camps and installations
- Establishing political legitimacy for themselves by establishing a constitution with a political process with debates, elections, etc.
- Facilitating and encouraging religious, educational, and cultural expression within the camps
- Arranging for employment for the refugees, though not in enterprises that would contribute to the German economy
- Supporting the absorption in the camp infrastructure of "new" refugees arriving from Eastern Europe
- Resolving acrimonious and sometimes violent disputes between the camps and German police
- Managing the public image of displaced persons, particularly with respect to black market activities
- Advocating immigration destinations for the refugees, in particular to the British Mandate in Palestine, but also the United States, Australia, and elsewhere

Military authorities were at first reluctant to officially recognize the central committees as the official representatives of the Jewish refugees in DP camps, though cooperation and negotiations carried characteristics of a de facto acceptance of their mandate. Eventually on September 7, 1946, at a meeting in Frankfurt, the American military authorities recognized the Central Committee of the Liberated Jews as a legitimate party to the issue of the Jewish displaced persons in the American sector.

== Political activism ==
What the people of the Sh'erit ha-Pletah had in common was what had made them victims in the first place, but other than that they were a diverse group. Their outlook, needs, and aspirations varied tremendously. There were strictly observant Jews as well as individuals that had earlier been assimilated into secular culture. Religious convictions ran from the Revisionist group to Labor Zionists and even ideological communists. Although Yiddish was the common language within the community, individuals came from virtually every corner of Europe.

There was lively political debate, involving satire, political campaigns, and the occasional acrimony. The growth of Yiddish newspapers within the camps added fuel to the political culture.

The political environment of the community evolved during its years of existence. In the first year or two, it was predominantly focused on improving the conditions in the camps and asserting the legitimacy of the community as an autonomous entity. Over time, the emphasis shifted to promoting the Zionist goals of allowing immigration into the British Mandate in Palestine; political divisions within the Sh'erit ha-Pletah mirrored those found in the Yishuv itself.

At every turn, the community expressed its opposition and outrage against British restrictions on Jewish immigration to Palestine. In the British sector, the protests approached a level of civil disobedience; in the American sector, attempts were made to apply political pressure to alleviate these restrictions. The relationship between Sh'erit ha-Pletah and British authorities remained tense until the State of Israel was formed. This came to a head when Lieutenant General Sir Frederick E. Morgan – then UNRRA chief of operations in Germany – claimed that the influx of Jewish refugees from Eastern Europe as "nothing short of a skillful campaign of anti-British aggression on the part of Zion aided and abetted by Russia... [meaning] death to the British." (Morgan was allowed to remain in his post after this comment but was fired when making similar comments later).

In late 1945, the UNRRA conducted several surveys among Jewish refugees, asking them to list their preferred destination for emigration. Among one population of 19,000, 18,700 named "Palestine" as their first choice, and 98% also named "Palestine" as their second choice. At the camp in Fürth, respondents were asked not to list Palestine as both their first and second choice, and 25% of the respondents then wrote "crematorium".

All the while, the Sh'erit ha-Pletah retained close relationships with the political leadership of the Yishuv, prompting several visits from David Ben-Gurion and other Zionist leaders. While officially detached from the committees, there was considerable support for clandestine immigration to Palestine through the Aliya Beth programs among the refugees; and tacit support for these activities also among American, UNRRA, Joint and other organizations. A delegation (consisting of Norbert Wollheim, Samuel Schlumowitz, Boris Pliskin, and Leon Retter flew to the United States to raise funds for the community, appealing to a sense of pride over "schools built for our children, four thousand pioneers on the farms... thousands of youths in trades schools... self-sacrifice of doctors, teachers, writers... democratization... hard-won autonomy," and also met with officials at the US War Department and Sir Raphael Salento over the formation of the International Refugee Organization.

Over time, the Sh'erit ha-Pletah took on the characteristics of a state in its own right. It coordinated efforts with the political leadership in the Yishuv and the United States, forming a transient power triangle within the Jewish world. It sent its own delegation to the Twenty-Second Zionist Congress in Basel.

== A community dedicated to its own dissolution ==
With the exception of 10,000–15,000 who chose to make their homes in Germany after the war (see Central Council of Jews in Germany), the vast majority of the Jewish DPs ultimately left the camps and settled elsewhere. About 136,000 settled in Israel, 80,000 in the United States, and another 20,000 in other nations, including Canada and South Africa.

Although the community established many of the institutions that characterize a durable society, and indeed came to dominate an entire section of Munich, the overriding imperative was to find new homes for the refugees. To make the point, many of the leaders emigrated at the first possible opportunity. Both overt lobbying efforts and underground migration sought to open for unrestricted immigration to Palestine. And the camps largely emptied once the state of Israel was established, many of the refugees immediately joining the newly formed Israel Defense Forces to fight the 1948 Arab-Israeli War.

The Central Committee in the American sector declared its dissolution on December 17, 1950, at the Deutsche Museum in Munich. Of the original group that founded the committee, only Rabbi Samuel Snieg remained for the dissolution. All the others had already emigrated, most of them to Israel. Rabbi Snieg had remained to complete the first full edition of the Talmud published in Europe after the Holocaust, the so-called Survivors' Talmud.

The last DP camp, Föhrenwald, closed in February 1957, by then populated only by the so-called "hardcore" cases, elderly, and those disabled by disease.

== Legacy ==
Suicide amongst survivors has been a subject of some disagreement amongst Israeli medical professionals. In 1947, Dr. Aharon Persikovitz, a gynecologist who had survived the Dachau concentration camp gave a lecture called "The Psychological State Of the New Immigrant" in which he said: "Holocaust survivors do not commit suicide; they heroically prove the continuity of the Jewish people". According to Professor Yoram Barak this statement became "an accepted national myth". Barak says "The survivors themselves also did not want to be stigmatized as `sick, weak and broken;' rather, they wanted to join in the myth of the heroic sabra who just recently fought a glorious War of Independence against the enemy."

== See also ==
- Aftermath of World War II
- Beni Virtzberg
- Cyprus internment camps
- Sam Dubbin
- Charles Thau
