= Wolf Durmashkin =

Composer (1914–1944)

Wolf Durmashkin (Lithuania, March 7, 1914 in Lithuania – September 18 or 19, 1944 in Klooga concentration camp, Estonia) was a Jewish composer, conductor and pianist in Vilnius (then known as Vilna), Lithuania. He was murdered in the Holocaust.

== Life ==
Wolf Durmashkin was born in Lithuania, the exact place of birth is unknown. He was the son of Akiva Durmashkin, liturgical music director and choir leader, and Shayna Durmashkin. His sisters were Fania Durmashkin and Henia Durmashkin; after the war they performed with the Ex-Concentration Camp Orchestra.

He graduated from the Vilna Conservatory of Music and the Warsaw Conservatory. He produced and directed the opera Aida in Hebrew.

Wolf Durmashkin was appointed conductor of the Vilna Symphony in 1939 at the age of 25. He organized a symphony orchestra and a 100-voice Hebrew choir while incarcerated in the Vilna Ghetto. The ghetto orchestra performed 35 chamber and symphonic concerts in the 15 months of its existence under his direction.

In September 1943 when the Vilna Ghetto was liquidated, Wolf Durmashkin was taken to the Klooga, Estonia concentration camp.

He was murdered on September 18 or 19, 1944.

== Wolf Durmashkin Composition Award ==
The Wolf Durmashkin Composition Award (WDCA) is an international composition contest, as well as a music- and composition award designed by the German cultural society dieKunstBauStelle in Landsberg am Lech. It is named after Wolf Durmashkin. The award was founded in 2018 by Karla Schönebeck and Wolfgang Hauck. The cause was the 70th anniversary of a concert played by Jewish Holocaust survivors from the DP-Orchestra in Landsberg am Lech on 10 May 1948. It was conducted by Leonard Bernstein.

== Literature ==
- Herman Kruk, "The Last Days of the Jerusalem of Lithuania, Chronicles from the Vilna Ghetto and the Camps, 1939–1944, trans. By Barbara Harshav (New York: YIVO Institute for Jewish Research, 2002)
- Rachel Kostanian-Danzig, "Spiritual Resistance in the Vilna Ghetto (Vilna: Vilna Gaon Jewish State Museum), 112
- Cantore natan Stolnitz, "Akiva Durmashkin and His Influence on Liturgical Music in Old Radom", The Radomer Voice, April 1964
