= Wolf Durmashkin Composition Award =

The Wolf Durmashkin Composition Award, short WDCA, is an international composition contest, as well as a music- and composition award designed by the German cultural society dieKunstBauStelle e. V. in Landsberg am Lech. It is named after the Jewish composer and conductor Wolf Durmashkin (1914–1944).

In 2018 its participants were awarded for the first time. The competition is held in irregular intervals and the award ceremony takes place in different cities each time. The locations are chosen based on their historical references to the competition. In 2021 the ceremony is planned to be held in Vilnius, Lithuania, the home of the competition's namesake. The first-ever competition in 2018 was part of a themed festival week called 70 years – International Jewish-German festival and represented a new and interactive form of commemorative culture relating to the Holocaust.

It was not only a cooperation between DieKunstBauStelle e. V. and the University of Music and Performing Arts in Munich and the Bavarian Philharmonic orchestra but was also supported internationally.

The Wolf Durmashkin Composition Award is specifically targeted at newcomers and composers up to the age of 35. Since all works of music premiere on the night of the ceremony, there are requirements concerning length and cast. Usually, three of all submitted works are awarded in total.

== Background ==
The award was founded in 2018 by journalist and author Karla Schönebeck and Wolfgang Hauck. The cause was the 70th anniversary of a concert played by Jewish Holocaust survivors from the DP-Orchestra in Landsberg am Lech on 10 May 1948. It was conducted by Leonard Bernstein.

== Namesake ==
The Jewish musician and composer Wolf Durmashkin is the WDCA's namesake. He came from a Jewish-Polish family of musicians in Vilnius, Lithuania. He conducted the Vilnius State Orchestra and worked as a choirmaster and composer.

After his hometown had been occupied by German troops in 1941, Wolf Durmashkin and his family were forced to live in the Vilna Ghetto. He continued his musical activities under the new restrictions until his death. He was shot in the Klooga concentration camp, Estonia, in 1944, just one day before the camp was liquidated.

His two sisters Henia (a singer) and Fania (a pianist) were deported to concentration camps in Kaufering and Landsberg am Lech, which were part of the Dachau Concentration Camp. Four weeks after their liberation in 1945 they founded the St. Ottilien Orchestra together with other musicians, who had survived the Holocaust. They performed said concert, conducted by Leonard Bernstein, in Landsberg and Feldafing on 10 May 1948.

== Patronage ==
2018 Abba Naor

== Award winners ==
2018

- First prize: Bracha Bdil, Jerusalem, Israel, born 1988
- Second prize: Rose Miranda Hall, York, England, born 1991
- Third prize: Otto Wanke, Vienna, Austria, born 1989
