= Philip R. Alstat =

American Conservative rabbi, teacher, chaplain, speaker and writer

Rabbi Philip R. Alstat
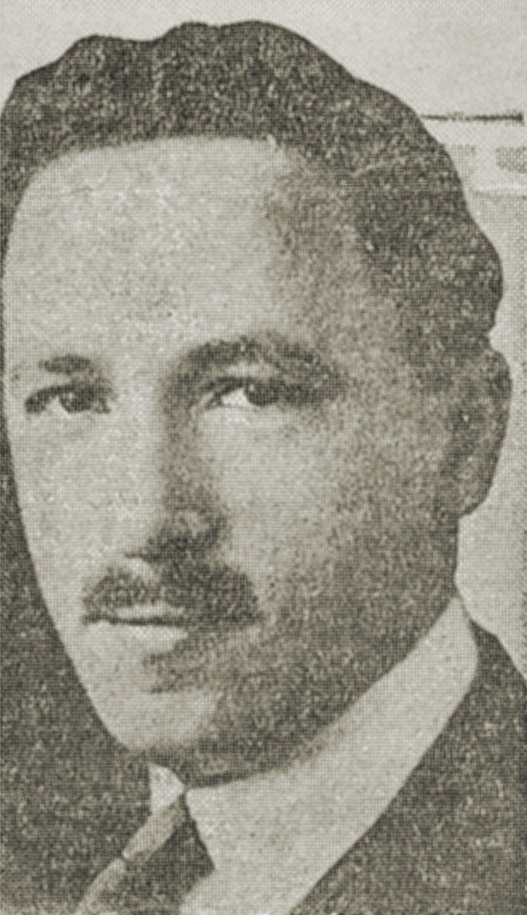
- Alstat, around 1920

Personal life
- Born: July 15, 1891 Kaunas, Lithuania
- Died: November 29, 1976 (aged 85) New York, United States

Religious life
- Religion: Judaism
- Ordination: Jewish Theological Seminary of America

Philip Reis Alstat (July 15, 1891 – November 29, 1976) was a well-known American Conservative rabbi, teacher, chaplain, speaker and writer. Born in Kaunas (formerly, Kovno), Lithuania, he came to the United States in 1898, studying at City College of New York (A.B., 1912), Columbia University (A.M., 1915), and the Jewish Theological Seminary of America (JTS), where he received semikhah, rabbinic ordination, in 1920, and the Doctor of Divinity degree (honoris causa), in 1966.

For many years, he lived at JTS, serving as an informal and unofficial in-house counselor and mentor for generations of rabbinical students. In addition to his experience as a pulpit rabbi in New York synagogues including Congregation Shaare Zedek (New York City) on Manhattan's upper-West side, he was a chaplain for a number of New York institutions, including The Tombs, the Manhattan Detention Complex, and oversaw courses for prospective converts to Judaism in New York City. For more than four decades, he wrote the widely syndicated weekly newspaper column, Strange to Relate.

== Life and work ==
Alstat, the brother of Rabbi Murray Alstet, was "one of the early pioneers" of the Conservative movement, attending rabbinical school with classmates who would become many of the teachers and leaders of the movement. He graduated in 1920, in the same class as Max Kadushin, and one year before future JTS Chancellor, Louis Finkelstein. Early in his rabbinic career, he served in a number of synagogue pulpits, including Temple Sons of Israel, in White Plains, New York, 1920–21; Temple Beth Elohim, 1921–25; Temple Adath Israel, The Bronx, NY, 1925–30; and Temple Bnai Israel-Sheerith Judah, in upper Manhattan, 1933–1955., before leaving to focus on other endeavors, including teaching, writing, and chaplaincy service in New York prisons, hospitals, and senior citizen facilities.

Alstat was an ardent Zionist and an early representative of the World Zionist Organization (WZO). In 1935, he spoke to a combined meeting of the Zionist Organization of America (ZOA) and Hadassah, declaring that "the solution of the problem of world Jewry lies in the rebuilding of the national Jewish homeland in Palestine." He stated that

World Jewry is now wrestling with a complexity of major problems, such as the combating of anti-Semitism which is rearing its ugly head in various lands; finding a refuge for the persecuted and exiled Jews of Germany; widening the ever-narrowing channels of economic opportunities for Jews; and preserving and transmitting the spiritual heritage of the Jewish people. All of these problems can be solved in large measure by accelerating the tempo of the rebuilding of the Jewish national homeland in Palestine.

In addition to his positions with the WZO and ZOA, he was on the Executive Boards of many other organizations, including the United Synagogue of America, the Jewish National Fund, and the United Palestine Appeal, and an active member of others, including the Rabbinical Assembly, and the New York Board of Rabbis.

He worked as a prison chaplain at the Manhattan Correctional Facility ("The Tombs") for three decades, and served as secretary of the National Council of Jewish Prison Chaplains, sharing information with rabbis who worked with inmates and prison staff in other facilities throughout the United States. He explained his vision of prison chaplaincy by saying that, "My goals are the same as those of the prison authorities—to make better human beings. The only difference is that their means are discipline, security, and iron bars. Mine are the spiritual ministrations that operate with the mind and the heart." He would sometimes take rabbinical students with him on his visits, schooling them on counseling techniques he had developed over the years. When he retired from prison chaplaincy work in 1974, as the city was preparing to tear down part of the facility (although it was eventually replaced by new buildings), he reflected over his career, noting that prison conditions had markedly improved, especially since the 1970 "upheavals" at The Tombs. He said there was "much more cordiality and serenity – if it's possible to have any serenity in a prison." In addition to his work as a prison chaplain, Alstat also served as a chaplain for Jewish Memorial Hospital, Sydenham Hospital, and the Williams Memorial Residence, operated by the Salvation Army.

His syndicated column, "Strange to Relate," was printed in many Jewish papers, and led to many invitations to speak at Jewish community events. He was described as a "prominent American lecturer on Jewish oddities, curiosities, and fantasies." However, while his column and some of his presentations focused on oddities—issues that were "strange to relate" – Alstat was also well known for speaking his mind on the most serious of issues, delivering important messages in eloquent ways. In an American Jewish History article on the Rabbinical Assembly (RA), the author noted that during Alstat's early time in the rabbinate, the RA's concerns were about America and the Conservative movement, but it was rare to deal with the problems "plaguing the American rabbi." Rabbi Alstat's address to the 1929 annual RA convention was especially noteworthy because he shared such concerns in a public forum, when he delivered the presentation, Observations on the Status of the Rabbinate. That address included he following words:

Of what avail is it to discern the relationship of "Traditional Judaism and Modern Life ..." or to analyze the "Spiritual Elements in Judaism," or to ascertain the "Abiding Value of the Belief in the Resurrection," unless the exponents of Judaism are invested with dignity and armed with authority? The rich "all-right-nickes" inwardly despise the rabbi because he is poor in worldly goods and economic security. ... How much respect can they have for the authority of their spiritual leader whose position is precarious, whose bread and butter they control, whose brief tenure of office and fear of the annual re-election make him the football of contending factions, an impotent creature whom they can bully, intimidate, and abuse with impunity? The Jewish intellectuals ... despise the rabbi, because, they charge, he is poor intellectually and spiritually, that he has no message for them ... no solution for any of our vexing problems ... that he is not a thinker or spiritual leader, but a maker of empty phrases. ...

The Yiddish-speaking orthodoxy also despises the modern rabbi ... because in their opinion, he is poor in Jewish scholarship and is poor in unquestioning loyalty to the letter of the Shulchan Aruch. All of them together agree that he is poor in sincerity of principle and constancy of policy, except in his coarse opportunism ... and his insatiable hunger and vulgar striving for publicity. ...

The rabbi's advice is rarely listened to in the councils of the congregation. ... His views are not sought by the lay leaders of Jewish education and philanthropy, and his opinion is not reckoned with by the Zionist officialdom. His prestige and authority have been usurped by aspiring politicians, ambitious judges and lawyers, and rich "kovod"-seeking laymen.

When I tried to persuade the promising sons of wealthy traditional Jews to enter the Jewish ministry, I was rewarded for my efforts with polite scorn. The parents, remembering how they regarded and treated their own rabbi, resented the suggestion that their sons voluntarily condemn themselves to lifelong martyrdom.

Alstat was an early champion of the rights of women, including their education and their place in academia. In the 1930s, he worked with Trude Weiss-Rosmarin, teaching courses on Jewish History and Modern Jewish Problems at "The School of the Jewish Woman," the institution she created on New York's Upper West Side, under the auspices of Hadassah. Weiss-Rosmarin, and those who worked with her, felt that "Jewish women had been short-changed ... and saw education was the remedy." "As an intellectual feminist," Weiss-Rosmarin promoted the study of the liturgy, learning the meaning and history of the prayers, "to stimulate attendance of women at synagogue." Through classes in history, philosophy, customs, and ceremonies, Alstat, along with the other well-known rabbis who taught at this school, helped promote this vision of increased education, not only for the women of that time, but also so that they could help their children. As Weiss-Rosmarin put it, "If you want your children to grow up as educated Jews, you yourself must become educated."

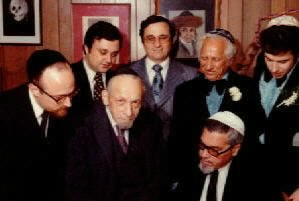
Alstat (center) witnessing a ketubah, Jewish marriage document, 1974

He was also involved in the spread and strengthening of the Conservative movement in many ways, speaking at many dedication ceremonies and other special events for Conservative congregations, as he did on September 17, 1927, for Ohev Shalom Synagogue Center, in a suburb of Philadelphia, Pennsylvania. He also was an important force in conversion studies for prospective converts to Judaism, individuals who would later come to be called, "Jews by choice." He sometimes taught the courses himself, but he also supervised a network of rabbinical students who would meet one-on-one with conversion students. At one point, virtually all requests for conversions under the auspices of the Conservative movement in New York City were referred to him by Conservative colleagues. Among the rabbinical students who helped him with the final stages of conversion, including the mikveh(ritual immersion) and beit din(rabbinical court), Alstat was well known for the way that, no matter what new name was chosen by the convert, he would link that name, and the conversion itself, to the Biblical story of Ruth, the most famous convert in the Bible.

Alstat lived in a JTS dormitory for forty-three years, serving as a counselor and mentor for generations of rabbinical students. He would share both his knowledge of Jewish subjects, and the practical techniques he had developed over the years for filing bits and pieces of information that later helped him with his columns, and could help rabbis with their articles and sermons. He was well known for speaking with rabbinic students upon their return from student pulpit positions during the Jewish High Holy Days, greeting them with the question, "How was your success?" This question would lead to serious discussions about the difference between success during a short visit and a successful rabbinic career that would span years. When rabbinical students were having a hard time putting together a eulogy for a funeral, he would advise them to ask the relatives, "What kind of a report card do you think this person would have received from God?" In his talks and even in the eulogies he delivered, he would teach that the way to "appraise and evaluate the life achievements of a rabbi" come from the Talmudic verse, where it is taught that we will be asked two questions: the second, whether we engaged in studies that were "Jewishly cultural and creative?"; but the very first, whether we dealt with others faithfully—with integrity. In Alstat's own eulogy, he was called "the friend, confidant and adviser to several generations of rabbinical students. Over the years he became the rabbi's rabbi as colleagues sought his counsel and advice."

=== Sermons and articles ===
Alstat was small in physical stature, 5' 2" tall, but he was a fiery and "towering" orator, whose sermons often created quite a stir among his congregants, and attracted the attention of the media. In 1928, the Bronx Jewish Herald included an article entitled, "Bronx Rabbi Takes a Fling at 'Lekovod Christmas' Jews." (The Hebrew word indicates that the targets of his sermon were Jews who showed more respect and honor to Christmas than to their own holidays and faith.) The article began by referencing Alstat's sermon, "delivered from the pulpit of the Adath Israel, the new and attractive synagogue gracing the corner of Grand Concourse and 169th street," and went on to say that, "Rabbi Philip R. Alstat took to task those Jews who act no different than the Judeo-Christians of eighteen centuries ago." It quoted the sermon almost in its entirety, which described ways some Jews were celebrating Christmas by exchanging gifts and singing carols, and concluded as follows:

It is not our wish to stir up religious rancor, or to engage in theological disputations or to draw odious comparisons between two faiths. Nothing is further from our intentions. In fact we have the highest respect for the Christian follower of Christianity. But eternal vigilance is the price a minority must pay for its existence, and we cannot look on with indifference when the weak members of the minority falter in their loyalty and succumb to the seductive charms of the majority. ... There is no convenient compromise between the "Mogen Dovid" and the cross, between "Adonai Echod" [note: these are the words, "One God," from the verse that begins with Shema Yisrael] and the Trinitarian conception of the deity. Would that there were an Elijah to confront the Judeo-Christians of 1928 and to hurl at them his challenge of old: "How long halt ye between two opinions?". ... Either be Jews or Christians – there is no room for Judeo-Christians in our midst!

But, just as he could use words to admonish, he could use them to build up hope. In 1939, in the article, "Passover's Message to Modern Jewry," he counseled hope, and even gratitude, as part of Jewish strength to withstand the pain of events in Europe:

Perhaps in our generation the counsel of our Talmudic sages may seem superfluous, for today the story of our enslavement in Egypt is kept alive not only by ritualistic symbolism, but even more so by tragic realism. We are the contemporaries and witnesses of its daily re-enactment. Are not our hapless brethren in the German Reich eating "the bread of affliction"? Are not their lives embittered by complete disenfranchisement and forced labor? Are they not lashed mercilessly by brutal taskmasters behind the walls of concentration camps? Are not many of their men-folk being murdered in cold blood? Is not the ruthlessness of the Egyptian Pharaoh surpassed by the sadism of the Nazi dictators? And yet, even in this hour of disaster and degradation, it is still helpful to "visualize oneself among those who had gone forth out of Egypt." It gives stability and equilibrium to the spirit. Only our estranged kinsmen, the assimilated, and the de-Judaized, go to pieces under the impact of the blow. ... But those who visualize themselves among the groups who have gone forth from the successive Egypts in our history never lose their sense of perspective, nor are they overwhelmed by confusion and despair. ... It is this faith, born of racial experience and wisdom, which gives the oppressed the strength to outlive the oppressors and to endure until the day of ultimate triumph when we shall "be brought forth from bondage unto freedom, from sorrow unto joy, from mourning unto festivity, from darkness unto great light, and from servitude unto redemption.

This theme of remembering pain in the past in a way that helped build hope for the future was the focus of a 1938 sermon that was quoted in The New York Times, "Undaunted, we confidently expect that some day, somehow, the present low ebb of liberty and democracy will be followed by a rising tide whose onrush will irresistibly wash away the ramparts of tyranny." His sermons and articles targeted the Jewish community, the United States, the "family of nations," the "Jewish homeland in Palestine," and frequently described the importance of the "Jewish State" – a nation yet not created, but which he supported with both his words and his actions. He shared his vision of that State by proclaiming that, "Whether the Jewish State be large or small, its importance in the family of nations will be determined, not by its limited area, but by its creative genius and cultural contributions to mankind. Like Judaea and Athens of old, it may be only a small vessel, but exceedingly rich in precious content."

In addition to numerous articles of his own, he frequently translated articles from Yiddish papers for publication by the English-language press.

=== Strange to Relate ===
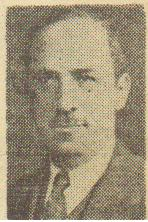
The photo of Alstat that accompanied hundreds of his newspaper articles.

For almost 40 years, from 1938 through 1976, the year of his death—in some 1500 weekly columns – Alstat wrote Strange to Relate, a column that revealed little-known information about Judaism, its people, its history, and its faith, and their intersection with American and World events. The columns appeared in both English and Yiddish papers, including The American Examiner, and The New York Jewish Week. Quoting poetry, literature, and the latest news stories, ranging from scientific discoveries to international events, he wrote articles about the often surprising and usually unanticipated "Jewish connections" in the news. From the fact that the story of the Jewish festival of Hanukkah is recorded in the Catholic Bible's Book of Maccabees, but not in the Hebrew Bible; to the way the ancient Jewish prayer for the New Moon had to be changed after the first lunar Moon landing—taking out the phrase, "but we have never touched you"; to the fact that, after World War II, German money helped print a 17-volume edition of the Talmud – when the Survivors' Talmud (also known as the U.S. Army Talmud, because it was dedicated to the U.S. Army) was published, based on the realization that many Jews in the displaced persons camps were as hungry for Jewish books as they were for food; to scientific theories offered by a Russian about the way an unusual alignment of the planets caused the splitting of the Red Sea; to the way Talmudic rabbis, not Benjamin Franklin, invented the lightning rod, his articles were read by lay people and Jewish leaders alike.

These few examples of the titles of his columns reveal the wide range of his topics:

- Jewish Aspects of Moon Exploration
- Jewish Aspects of Benjamin Franklin
- President Lyndon Johnson, Through Jewish Eyes
- Golda Meir Recalls Her Rosh Hashanah in Moscow

His columns were frequently quoted by rabbis throughout the country in sermons and columns. Additionally, in letters to the editor and personal correspondence, readers would write about "their indebtedness to him for their revived interest in Torah and the people of Israel.". The columns were frequently reprinted in the works of others during his lifetime, and long after his death. For example, this story of the 13th century Jewish philosopher, Abraham Abulafia, was included in the 1995 collection, A Treasury of Jewish Anecdotes:

In the summer of 1280, Abraham Abulafia went to Rome to convert the Pope to Judaism. He wanted to meet Pope Nicklaus III on the eve of the Jewish New Year and persuade the leader of the world's Roman Catholics to become a Jew. The Pope, then at a summer house, heard of the plan, and ordered that Abulafia be burned at the stake. Abulafia arrived at the gate of the papal residence, but he was not arrested. The Pope had died as a result of an apoplectic stroke during the preceding night. Abulafia was jailed for 28 days and then released.

In addition to this column, he wrote frequent book reviews, including one of the first for The Earth is the Lord's, by Abraham Joshua Heschel. Additionally, he worked behind-the-scenes to support the work of many colleagues, often acknowledged in the book's preface, even after his death, as he was in the 1992 study, Economic analysis in Talmudic literature: rabbinic thought in the light of modern economics.

== Honors and memorials ==
After his death, the Rabbi Philip R. Alstat Prize for Literary Achievement was established at JTS for an outstanding rabbinical student; and two endowed JTS chairs, The Rabbi Philip R. Alstat Associate Professor of Talmud, and The Rabbi Philip R. Alstat Assistant Professor of Liturgy, were created in his memory.

However, in addition to such formal tributes to his life and his work, his most long-lasting memory may continue in the work of the countless rabbis whose hearts and minds this rabbi's rabbi touched during their time in rabbinical school. As Rabbi William Berkovitz, at that time, the spiritual leader of New York's Congregation B'nai Jeshurun, wrote in the New York Times:

The obituary notice of The New York Times made the observation that "Rabbi Philip R. Alstat left no survivors." However, those of us who attended the Jewish Theological Seminary during the last four decades know otherwise. We – his students – are his survivors. We – his colleagues – are his link to the future. And we – his friends – are the living witnesses to his enduring influence for over half a century, he built an empire of friendship, embracing students, scholars and all Jews, regardless of status or station in life And yet, he was more than teacher, colleague, and friend. He was a gifted spiritual mentor, a masgiach ruchani, whose wisdom kindled light when we were in darkness, whose counsel brought direction when we were lost in confusion, whose encouragement offered hope when we were caught in despair. Alas, the seminary halls will no longer be the same. Alas, the dormitory quarters will never be empty and desolate, devoid of his unique personality. Gone will be the gentle wit and gifted storyteller, gone will be the sage counselor and pius Jew, gone will be the humble spirit and songful soul, alas, gone will be Rabbi Alstat. We, his sorrowing family of disciples, mourn his passing but shall ever continue to invoke his spirit. His memory will ever be blessed.
