= Ex-Concentration Camp Orchestra =

The Jewish Ex-Concentration Camp Orchestra was an ensemble of Holocaust survivors who performed throughout the American Zone of occupied Germany between 1945 and 1949. Initially formed at the St. Ottilien Monastery hospital in Bavaria shortly after liberation, the orchestra toured displaced persons camps playing Yiddish songs and German classical music, performing in concentration camp uniforms. In 1946, the orchestra performed for prosecutors and staff of the Nuremberg Trials, and in 1948 played two concerts with Leonard Bernstein during his first visit to Germany.

== History ==
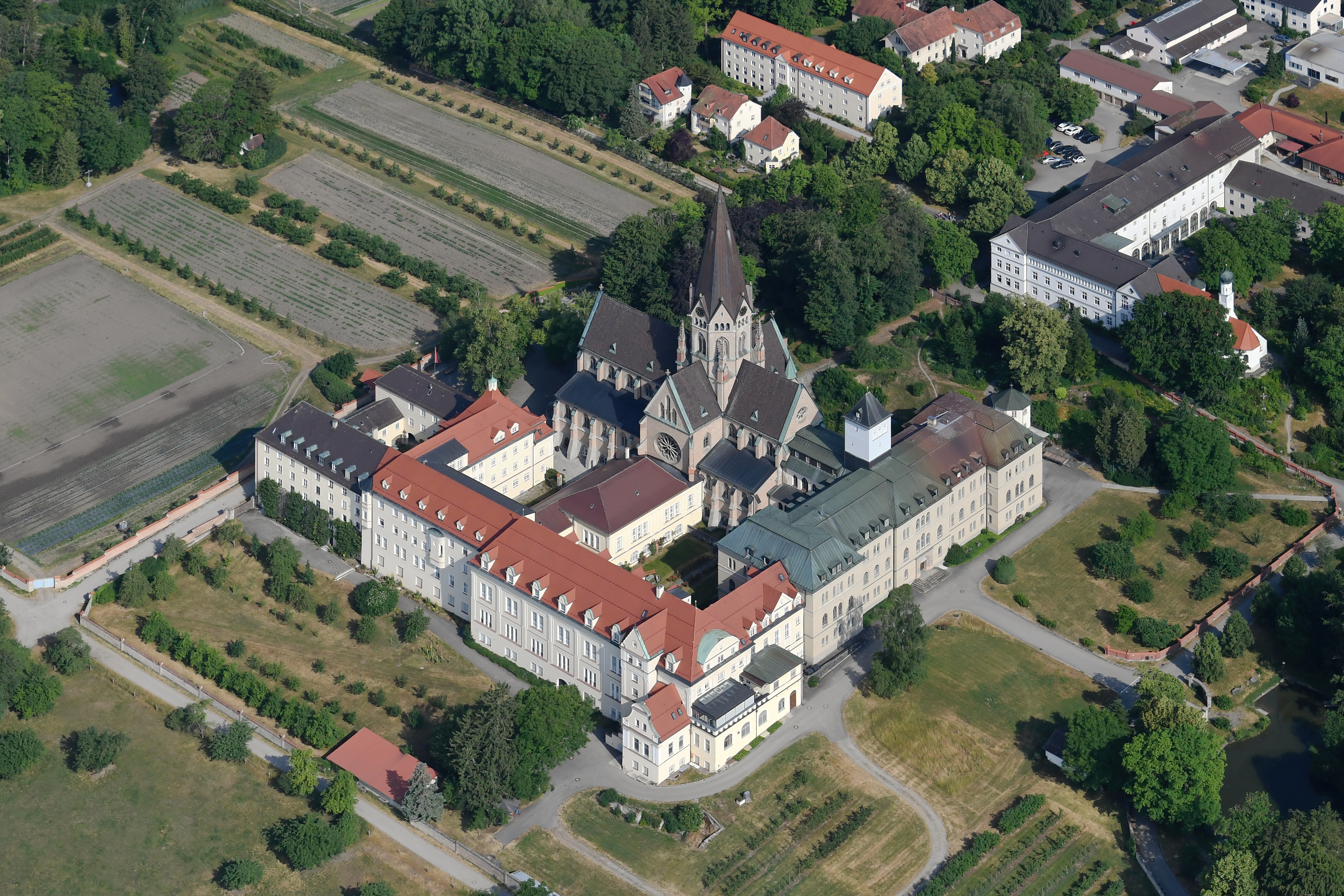
St. Ottilien Monastery

The orchestra originated on May 27, 1945, when eight liberated Jewish Holocaust survivors "gave their first concert on the hospital lawn" of the St. Ottilien Monastery. The ensemble initially called themselves the St. Ottilien Orchestra to commemorate the site of their recovery. Historian Abby Anderton described their first performance:

Standing on a makeshift stage covered by a canopy of sheets and repurposed parachute fabric, the musicians—dressed in striped concentration camp uniforms—opened the performance with the four national anthems of the Allied powers before playing arrangements of music by Bizet and Grieg. The event was much more than a liberation concert: The orchestra's performance was also remarkable for its symbolic meaning–Holocaust survivors appearing in Germany’s public sphere less than three weeks after the Nazi surrender.

The event was organized by Zalman Grinberg, the hospital's head doctor and a Dachau survivor, who delivered a speech that highlighted the stark contrast between Germany's cultural heritage and the atrocities committed during the Holocaust. Wehrmacht soldiers who were treated in the hospital before the war ended were also present on the concert.

Robert L. Hilliard, who was a soldier in the US army and an editor of an army newspaper, described the concert in his book Surviving the Americans:

A liberation concert at which most of the liberated people were too weak to stand. A liberation concert at which most of the people still could not believe they were free. ... The musicians played Mahler, Mendelssohn and others whose music had been forbidden for years. A concert of life and a concert of death. The sounds of the music welled into anguish. The movements and faces of the musicians were cramped, tight, fearful, as if they could not believe there was room to move a bow or air in which to blow a note, as if they momentarily expected guns and clubs to tear apart what, after so many years, must have felt to them only a dream.

Hilliard, a 20-year-old Jewish-American soldier, was horrified with the conditions in the US-operated DP camps, and started a campaign to change it. Together with a friend he sent hundreds of letters; they didn't stop when they were threatened to be sent to the Aleutian Islands. The letters eventually found their way to The New York Times and to President Truman.

After recuperating at St. Ottilien, the orchestra relocated to the American-run Landsberg displaced persons (DP) camp, formerly a concentration camp and Wehrmacht barracks west of Munich. To mark this move, they renamed themselves the Ex-Concentration Camp Orchestra. The ensemble expanded to include additional survivors, many of whom had formal musical training prior to the war. In 1946, the orchestra was able to obtain a bus to tour distant DP camps.

In September 1946, the orchestra merged with another DP ensemble, the Blue-White Orchestra, forming the Representative Concert Orchestra of the She'erit Hapletah ("the Surviving Remnant" in Hebrew; "Represenzentanc Orkester fun der Szeerit Hapleitah"). This final name referenced a term from the Book of Ezra that Holocaust survivors often used to describe themselves. The Central Committee of Liberated Jews provided most of the orchestra's funding, with occasional support from the United Nations Relief and Rehabilitation Administration (UNRRA) and the Joint Jewish Distribution Committee (JDC). The orchestra toured the American occupation zone in 1949-1949, performing at multiple DP camps: Neu-Freimann, Weilheim, Feldafing, Geretsried, Rosenheim, Bayerisch Gmain, Bad Reichenhall, Traunstein, Gabersee-Wasserburg, and Attel.

=== Orchestra members ===
The ensemble was led by violinist Misha Hofmekler, who had previously directed a small orchestra in the Kovno Ghetto that grew to forty-five members before most were sent to Dachau in 1944. Key members included Motel and Eli Borstein, father and son violinists who survived Dachau; sisters Henny and Fanny Durmashkin from Vilna, who studied voice and piano at the Vilna Conservatory; and Max Beker, a Vilna violinist who had been concertmaster at Stalag VIIIA, the same POW camp where Olivier Messiaen wrote "Quartet for the End of Time". The orchestra also featured clarinetist Rala Wolfberg, percussionist Melech Granatm and Chaim Arbeitman (later known as David Arben), a Warsaw-born violinist and the ensemble's youngest member at 17, who later became Associate Concert Master of the Philadelphia Orchestra. Other notable musicians were clarinetist Rala Wolfberg and percussionist Melech Granat. Additional performers included tenors Max Goldstein and George Richter, and soprano Luba Kupritz.

=== Notable performances ===
One of the orchestra's most significant appearances took place in May 1946 at the Nuremberg Opera House, where they performed for prosecutors and staff of the Nuremberg Trials. The venue choice was particularly symbolic, as it had previously served as a location for Nazi Party elites to attend Wagner's operas. They played Meyerbeer, Rossini, and Offenbach, Henny Durmashkin sung the Vilna Ghetto songs, including "So, One, Two, Three" (Tzu Eins, Tzwei, Drei). Anderton writes that this performance in Nuremberg "lent these musicians a sense of empowerment, in spite of their displacement". In the same year, the orchestra played for David Ben-Gurion at the first Congress of the Central Committee of Liberated Jews.

In May 1948, Leonard Bernstein, then the Principal Conductor of the Palestine Symphony Orchestra, conducted the ensemble during his first visit to Germany. Bernstein led concerts at the Landsberg and Feldafing DP camps, performing works by Weber, Bizet, Verdi, and Gershwin. Playing with Bernstein, the orchestra members wore black instead of camp uniform. As a gesture of gratitude, the orchestra presented Bernstein with an authentic concentration camp uniform; "Bernstein was horrified, but also deeply moved". Bernstein also conducted the Munich Philharmonic orchestra, which caused criticism in a DP newspaper.

=== Disbandment ===
The orchestra disbanded in 1949 as members obtained permissions to emigrate to the United States or Israel. Although several musicians wanted to continue the orchestra's activities, this never materialized. Many members went on to establish successful musical careers in their adopted countries.

== Repertoire and performance style ==
The orchestra performed works by Jewish composers previously labeled entartete Musik ("degenerate music") by the Nazis, such as works by Giacomo Meyerbeer and Jacques Offenbach, alongside ghetto and concentration camp songs, like "The Homeless", "Ghetto, I Will Never Forget You", and "Yisrolik". The ensemble also included classical European works, including pieces by German composers like Weber, Mozart, and Handel, as well as Misha Hofmekler's arrangements, including "Unzer Weg" (Our Way) and "Hebrew Fantasie".

The ensemble often opened concerts with Meyerbeer's "Coronation March" from his opera Le Prophète, a symbolically charged choice given the opera's themes of false prophecy and German violence: "A misguided megalomaniac proclaims himself a prophet, spurring Germany to violence during the sixteenth-century Anabaptist uprising".

Their performances emphasized Jewish displacement through distinctive staging elements. Musicians wore concentration camp uniforms sewn after liberation, personalized with their prisoner numbers on Stars of David. Under the uniforms "the musicians wore white dress shirts and slim black ties", while women wore make up and black pencil skirts. Performances frequently took place in former concentration camps and Wehrmacht barracks converted to DP camps. Stage decorations often included barbed wire fences and large Stars of David printed with "Jude".

== Legacy ==
In 2018, the commemoration concert was organized in the St. Ottilien Monastery by musicians from the Tel Aviv University's Buchmann-Mehta School of Music and the German violinist Anne-Sophie Mutter.

Max Beker's daughter donated his violin to the Violins of Hope project, that collects and restores violins of the Holocaust survivors.
