= Strange to Relate =

Newspaper column

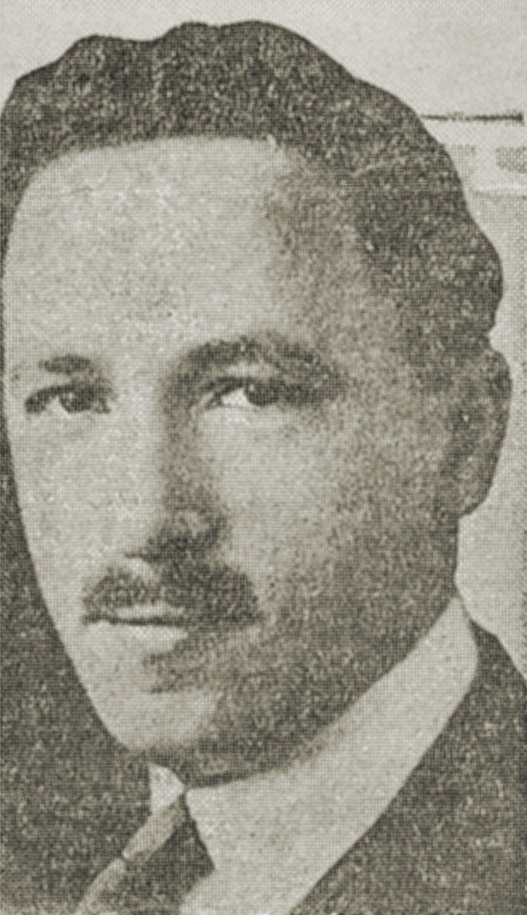
Rabbi Philip R. Alstat, c.1920

Strange to Relate was the name of a weekly syndicated newspaper column written by Rabbi Philip R. Alstat, that appeared in the Jewish press for almost 40 years, from 1938 through 1976, the year of Alstat's death. It first appeared in The Jewish Youth Journal and The American Examiner.

The column was sometimes referred to as a mixture of journalism, Jewish education and "Ripley's Believe It or Not!"

== The column ==
In the approximately 1500 weekly columns that Alstat wrote, Strange to Relate revealed fascinating and little-known information about Judaism, its history, its people, and their intersection with American and World events. The columns appeared in both English and Yiddish papers, including The American Examiner, and The New York Jewish Week. Quoting poetry, literature, and the latest news stories, ranging from scientific discoveries to international events, he wrote articles about the often surprising and usually unanticipated "Jewish connections" in the news.

== Content and titles ==
The subjects of the column were wide-ranging, dealing with facts about the Bible and its stories, the American and world Jewish communities, and historic events in the secular and Jewish calendars. Some examples include:

- the Jewish festival of Hanukkah is recorded in the Catholic Bible's Book of Maccabees, but not in the Hebrew Bible;
- the ancient Jewish prayer for the New Moon had to be changed after the first lunar Moon landing—taking out the phrase, "but we have never touched you";
- after WWII, German money helped print a 17-volume edition of the Talmud—when the Survivors' Talmud (also known as the U.S. Army Talmud, because it was dedicated to the U.S. Army) was published, based on the realization that many Jews in the displaced persons camps were as hungry for Jewish books as they were for food;
- there were scientific theories offered by a Russian about the way an unusual alignment of the planets caused the splitting of the Red Sea;
- Talmudic rabbis, not Benjamin Franklin, invented the lightning rod
- one of the first proposals for the Great Seal of the United States was the image of the Israelites crossing through the divided waters of the Red Sea, with Moses standing at the other end, with his hands raised to the sky.

Examples of the titles of his columns further reveal the wide range of his topics:

- Jewish Aspects of Moon Exploration
- Jewish Aspects of Benjamin Franklin
- President Lyndon Johnson, Through Jewish Eyes
- Golda Meir Recalls Her Rosh Hashanah in Moscow
- Religious Beginnings of Communism
- Yom Kippur before Rosh Hashanah?
- Columbus's Debt to Jews
- Jewish Kingdoms Outside Palestine
- Hitler's Gift to Jewry
- From the Priesthood to the Rabbinate
- British are Descendants of Ten Tribes, Nazis Say
- Watergate in Israel
- Mark Twain's Dirge: What would Yankee humorist write about the new Zion that has been rebuilt?

== Sample columns ==
=== Hebrew and Harvard ===
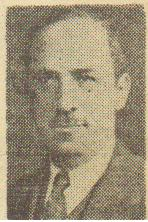
The photo of Alstat that accompanied hundreds of his columns.

In view of the difficulties encountered in introducing Hebrew as a subject in the high schools and colleges of New York City, one would never suspect that there was a time when the sacred tongue was readily accorded a place of honor in American higher education. This early American reverence for Hebraic scholarship was imported by the Puritans on the Mayflower from its European sources, the general cultural renaissance and the Protestant Reformation. Here in America it was then intensified by the extreme Puritan piety which regarded the Hebrew Scriptures as the direct revelation of God's will.

Consequently, when Harvard, the oldest of America's colleges, was founded in 1636 for the training of ministers, it was inevitable that Hebrew should play a significant role as a required course of study for the B.A. degree, in the daily scriptural lessons, and in oratorical and declamation contests (For 38 years, 1722–1760, it was taught by Judah Monis, a baptized Jewish hardware merchant of Cambridge, Mass.) Moreover, at the Commencement Exercises in 1685, both the President of Harvard, Increase Mather, and his son, Nathanael, delivered their orations in Hebrew.

However, the task of mastering this difficult semitic language proved so unpopular with the students that in 1825 the faculty was constrained to make the study of Hebrew optional (which innovation was incidentally the beginning of the elective system at Harvard).

In recent years, two Jewish philanthropists, Jacob H. Schiff and Lucius N. Littauer, attempted to revive interest in Hebraism at Harvard by endowing respectively, a Semitic Museum and a chair in Jewish literature and philosophy.

=== Maryland Once Denied Its Jews Right to Hold Office ===
Very few people, either Jewish or gentile, know that there was once a state in the Union where Jews were denied complete equality until 1826. That place was the State of Maryland. Though it was one of the thirteen original colonies that raised the flag of revolution against British tyranny, though its representatives were among the signatories to the Declaration of Independence which in 1776 declared that "all men were created equal," yet intolerance and religious bigotry persisted for half a century longer.

Through the colonial period (1634–1776) the Jews of Maryland were legally (de jure) not only without any civil rights, but even subject to the penalty of death for merely professing Judaism. Actually (de facto), however, they were tacitly granted undisturbed domicile and gradually allowed certain undefined rights.

With the adoption of a state constitution in 1776, the official association of the government and the Christian church was ended. The new law abolished the death penalty for professing Judaism and even granted to Jews the right to vote, but virtually denied them the right to hold office. For in the minds of the people, citizenship and church membership were still so closely identified that those elected or appointed to political office were required by law to take an oath ending with the doctrinal affirmation "of belief in the Christian religion."

Beginning with 1797, the Jews of Maryland were naturally persistent in their efforts for the removal of all their civil disabilities; but the House of Delegates was equally consistent in rejecting their petitions and defeating the bills designed to bring them relief. Thus the struggle continued, with the aid of influential Christians the pre press of the country, till February 26, 1825, when the House of Delegates, by a vote of 26 to 25, finally passed a bill which provided that Jewish citizens taking the oath of office shall substitute for the affirmation of "belief in the Christian religion," another declaration of belief in a future world of rewards and punishments. When this law became effective in 1826, the Jewish emancipation in Maryland was complete. Subsequently, constitutional conventions abolished the religious test altogether.

== Reprints and citations ==
His columns were frequently quoted by rabbis throughout the country in sermons and columns. Additionally, in letters to the editor and personal correspondence, readers would write about "their indebtedness to him for their revived interest in Torah and the people of Israel.". The columns were frequently reprinted in the works of others during his lifetime, and long after his death. For example, this story of the 13th century Jewish philosopher, Abraham Abulafia, was included in the 1995 collection, A Treasury of Jewish Anecdotes:

In the summer of 1280, Abraham Abulafia went to Rome to convert the Pope to Judaism. He wanted to meet Pope Nicklaus III on the eve of the Jewish New Year and persuade the leader of the world's Roman Catholics to become a Jew. The Pope, then at a summer house, heard of the plan, and ordered that Abulafia be burned at the stake. Abulafia arrived at the gate of the papal residence, but he was not arrested. The Pope had died as a result of an apoplectic stroke during the preceding night. Abulafia was jailed for 28 days and then released.
