= Chaplain =

Spiritual representative attached to a secular institution

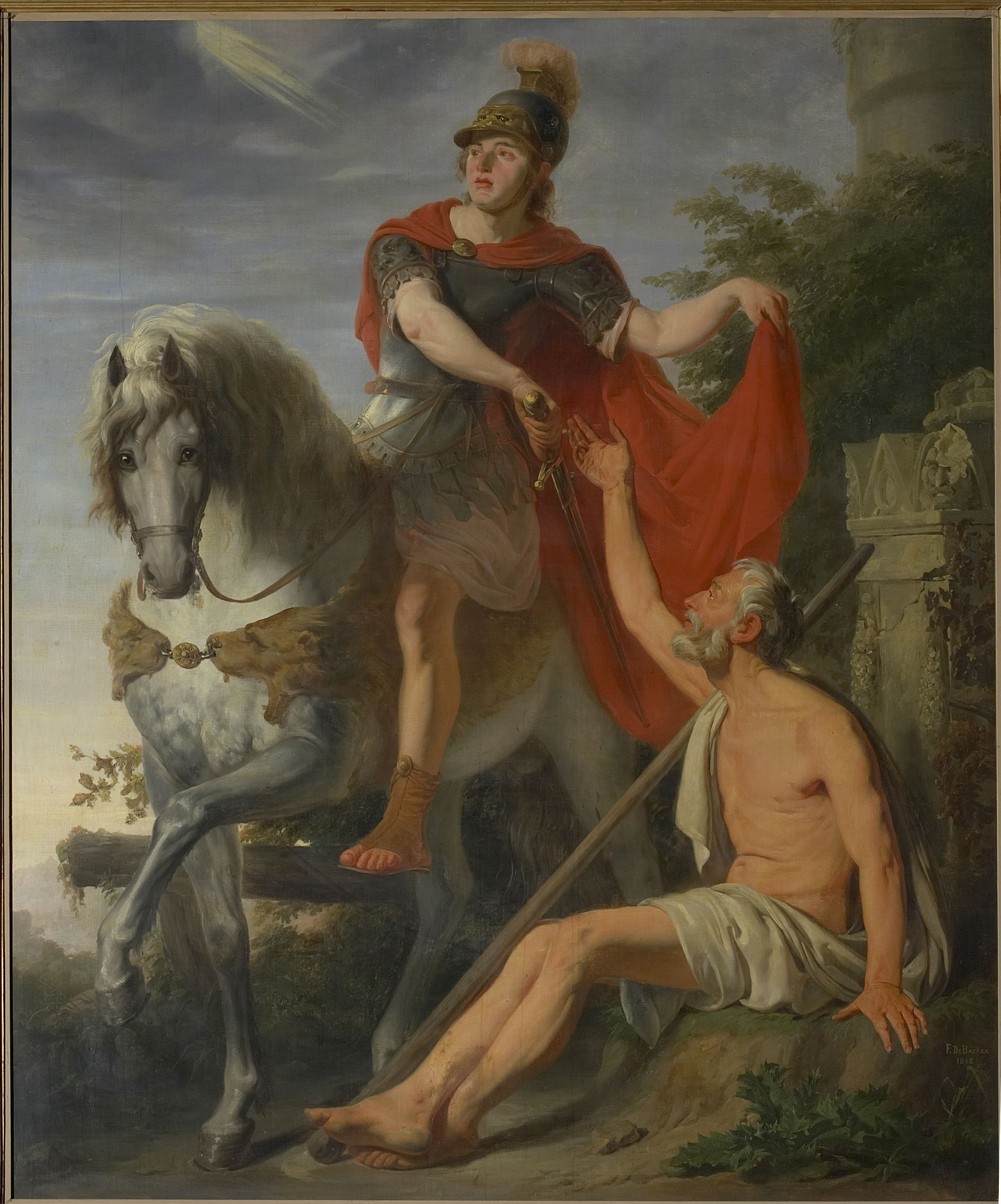
Martin of Tours giving his capellanu cape, from which the field of chaplaincy got its name.

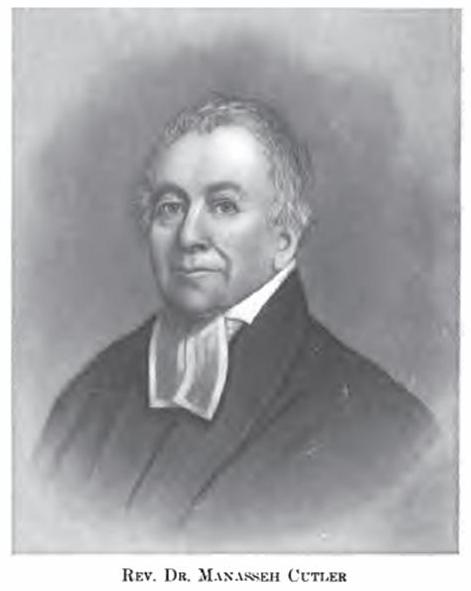
The Reverend Manasseh Cutler, American Revolutionary War chaplain who served in George Washington's Continental Army and co-founded Ohio University

A chaplain is a trained professional, who provides spiritual, emotional, and psychosocial support in secular or religious institutions, serving people of any faith or no faith. The term chaplaincy can refer to the chapel, facility, or department in which one or more chaplains carry out their role, as well as to the profession itself. The name originates from Martin of Tours, who gave his cappellanu cloak to a veteran in need during a snowstorm.

Though the term chaplain originally referred to representatives of the Christian faith, it is now also applied to people of other religions or philosophical traditions, as in the case of chaplains serving with military forces and an increasing number of chaplaincies at U.S. universities. In recent times, many lay people have received professional training in chaplaincy and are now appointed as chaplains in schools, hospitals, companies, universities, prisons and elsewhere to work alongside, or instead of, official members of the clergy. The concepts of a multi-faith team, secular, generic, or humanist chaplaincy are also gaining increasing use, particularly within healthcare and educational settings.

In the Catholic tradition, a chaplain is also a traditional title for an auxiliary priest (i.e., priest assistant/cooperator) assigned to a parish and subordinate to its pastor. This position is now officially called parochial vicar or assistant priest; some dioceses use the term chaplain officially. Side buildings of some parish houses (i.e., rectories) are traditionally called "chaplain houses". This historic term originated because the chaplain was usually assigned to a filial church or a chapel. Until 1983, the 1917 Code of Canon Law (canons 471–476) distinguished 5 types of parochial vicars: vicarius actualis, vicarius oeconomus, vicarius substitutus, vicarius adiutor, and vicarius cooperator, the latter of whom is traditionally called a chaplain. The 1983 Code of Canon Law does not distinguish such subtypes. The parochial vicar can take charge of part of the parish, groups of parishioners (e.g., youth, students, older adults, etc.), or specific tasks.

== Military ==
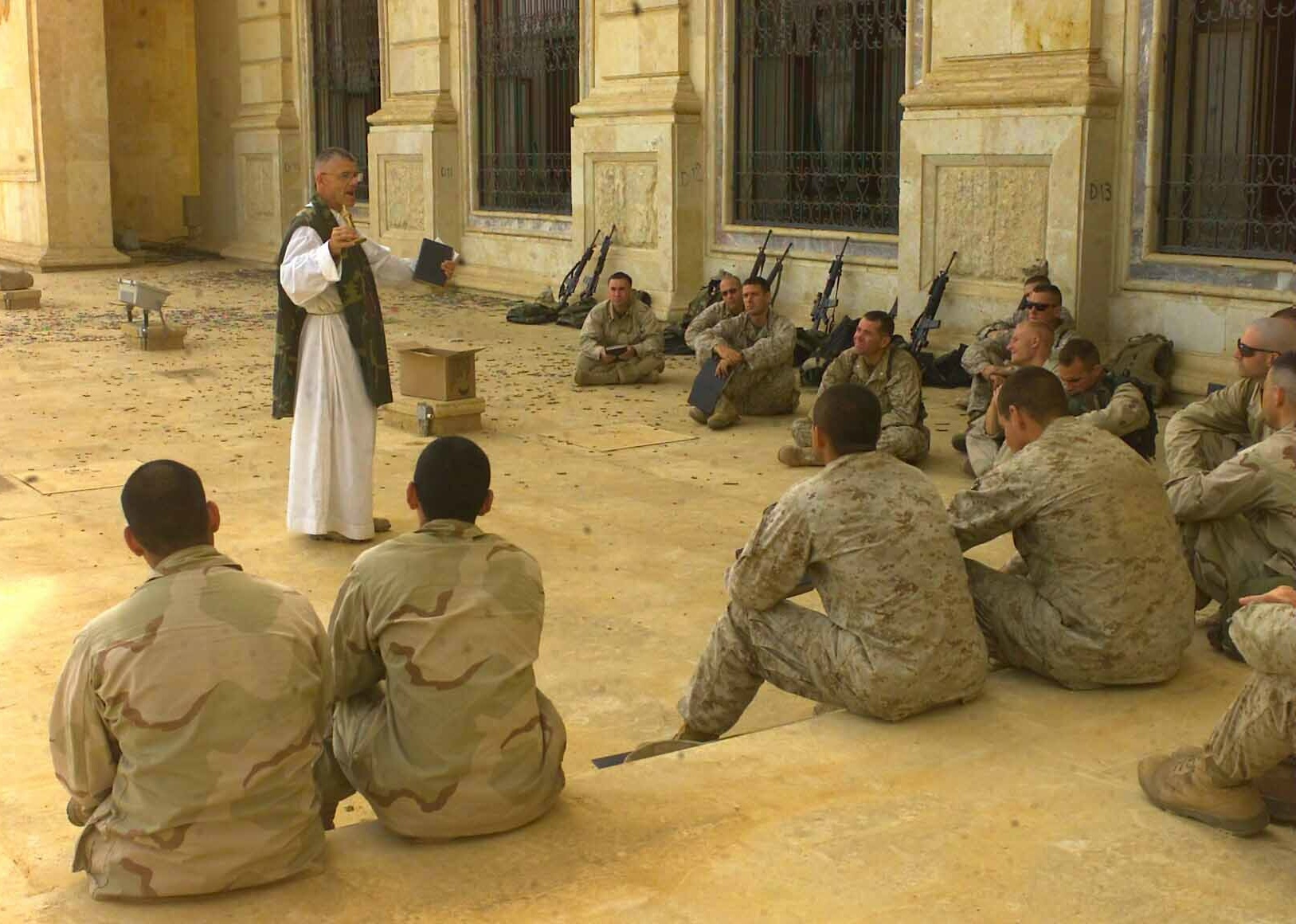
A Catholic chaplain ministers to American Marines and Sailors in Tikrit, Iraq

The first chaplains were in the military during the Roman Empire after its Christianization. Military chaplains provide pastoral, spiritual and emotional support for service personnel, including the conduct of religious services at sea, on bases or in the field. Military chaplains have a long history; the first English military-oriented chaplains, for instance, were priests on board proto-naval vessels during the 8th century. Land-based chaplains appeared during the reign of King Edward I. The current form of military chaplain dates from the era of the First World War.

Chaplains are nominated, appointed, or commissioned in different ways in different countries. A military chaplain can be an army-trained soldier with additional theological training or an ordained person nominated to the army by religious authorities. In the United Kingdom the Ministry of Defence employs chaplains but their authority comes from their sending church. Royal Navy chaplains undertake a 16-week bespoke induction and training course including a short course at Britannia Royal Naval College and specialist fleet time at sea alongside a more experienced chaplain. Naval chaplains called to service with the Royal Marines undertake a grueling five-month-long Commando Course and, if successful, wear the commandos' Green Beret. British Army chaplains undertake seven weeks training at the Armed Forces Chaplaincy Centre Beckett House and the Royal Military Academy Sandhurst. Royal Air Force chaplains must complete a 12-week Specialist Entrant course at the RAF College Cranwell followed by the Chaplains' Induction Course at the Armed Forces Chaplaincy Centre Beckett House of a further two weeks. The United States Navy will often give chaplain training to cadets seeking a theological route in the military. Additionally, they are granted instant employment as a Navy chaplain once ordained. Additionally, in the United States military, chaplains must be endorsed by their religious affiliation in order to serve in any facet of the military. In some cases, like that of the U.S. Navy, a Religious Program Specialist may be appointed to help alleviate some of the duties bestowed upon Naval chaplains.

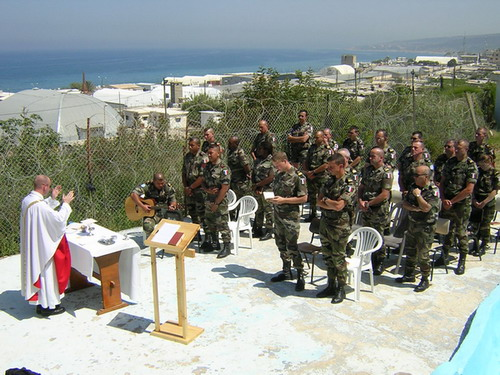
French soldiers of the UNIFIL attending a Catholic Mass in Lebanon

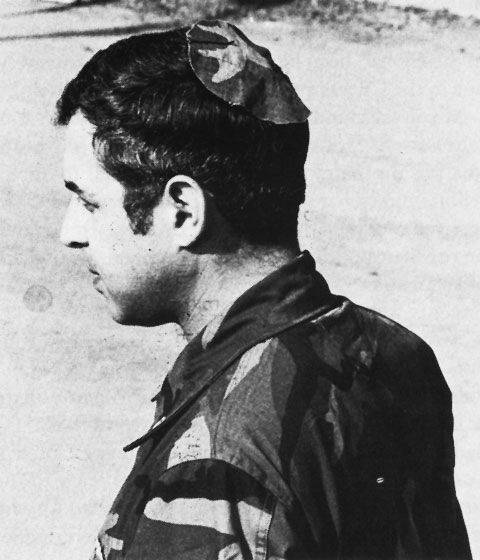
Jewish chaplain Rabbi Arnold Resnicoff wears a kippah/yarmulke made from a piece of a Catholic chaplain's camouflage uniform after his own head covering had become bloodied when it was used to wipe the face of a wounded marine during the 1983 Beirut barracks bombing.

Military chaplains are normally accorded officer status, although Sierra Leone had a Naval Lance Corporal chaplain in 2001. In most navies, their badges and insignia do not differentiate their levels of responsibility and status. By contrast, in air forces and armies, they typically carry ranks and are differentiated by crosses or other equivalent religious insignia. However, United States military chaplains in every branch carry both rank and Chaplain Corps insignia.

Though the Geneva Conventions does not state whether chaplains may bear arms, they specify (Protocol I, June 8, 1977, Art 43.2) that chaplains are non-combatants. In recent times both the UK and US have required chaplains, but not medical personnel, to be unarmed. Other nations, notably Norway, Denmark and Sweden, make it an issue of individual conscience. Captured chaplains are not considered Prisoners of War (Third Convention, August 12, 1949, Chapter IV Art 33) and must be returned to their home nation unless retained to minister to prisoners of war.

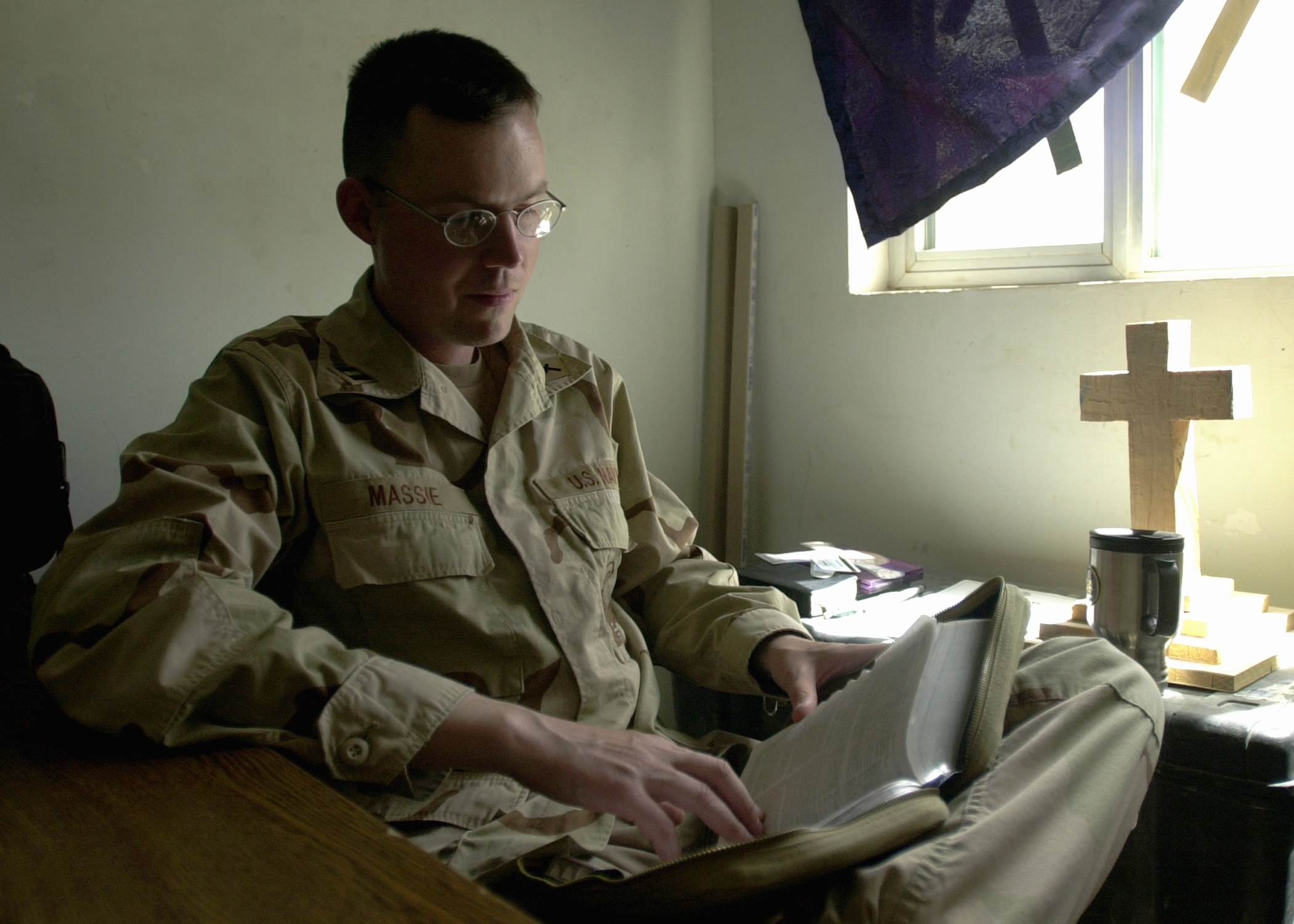
A U.S. Navy chaplain in Iraq studies his Bible for an upcoming service.

Inevitably, a significant number of serving chaplains have died in action. 100 chaplains of the U.S. Army and the U.S. Marine Corps were killed in action during World War II: a casualty rate greater "than any other branch of the services except the infantry and the Army Air Corps" (Crosby, 1994, p. 23). Many have been decorated for bravery in action (five have won Britain's highest award for gallantry, the Victoria Cross). The Chaplain's Medal for Heroism is a special U.S. military decoration given to military chaplains who have been killed in the line of duty, although it has to date only been awarded to the famous Four Chaplains, all of whom died in the Dorchester sinking in 1943 after giving up their lifejackets to others. In addition to these, five other U.S. chaplains have been awarded the Medal of Honor: Chaplain (LCDR) Joseph T. O'Callahan, USN (World War II); Chaplain (CPT) Emil Kapaun, USA (Posthumous, Korean War); Chaplain (LT) Vincent R. Capodanno, USN (Posthumous, Vietnam War); Chaplain (MAJ) Charles J. Watters, USA (Posthumous, Vietnam War); and Chaplain (CPT) Angelo J. Liteky, USA (Vietnam). (Later in life, Liteky changed his name to Charles, left the Catholic priesthood, became an anti-war activist, and renounced his Medal of Honor). Chaplain Fellowship Ministries military chaplains are nondenominational. To be considered for appointment to serve as a military chaplain, candidates must first be ordained and have an ecclesiastical endorsement by a valid religious faith group recognized by the Department of Defense. Candidates must meet all DOD requirements. The Chaplain Fellowship had military chaplains serving in Iraq and now in Afghanistan.

In 2006, training materials obtained by U.S. intelligence showed that insurgent snipers fighting in Iraq were urged to single out and attack engineers, medics, and chaplains on the theory that those casualties would demoralize entire enemy units. The United States European Command has co-sponsored an annual International Military Chiefs of Chaplains Conference every year since 1991 to consider the various issues affecting chaplaincy ministry and other military personnel. At times, the existence of military chaplains has been challenged in countries that have a separation of Church and State. However one of the major issues affecting chaplaincy and military personnel is that of moral injury arising as a result of international conflicts and terrorism.

== Health care ==
"Chaplains" are known by a large range of interchangeable titles. Other terms include: Spiritual Care Provider, Pastoral Care Provider, Spiritual Health Practitioner (especially in CASC/ACSS - the Canadian Chaplaincy Organization), Clinical Pastoral Education Supervisor (for ICPT-certified educators).

In healthcare chaplains are employed in acute care medical hospitals, pediatric hospitals, behavioral health hospitals, long-term facilities (assisted living, skilled nursing), out-patient clinics, addiction treatments and hospice/palliative care. There are over 10,000 professional chaplains in the United States including a large number who serve in Veteran Affairs health care settings. Chaplains care for people of all faiths and no faith.

The 2000 Chaplaincy White Paper was the first joint statement by five major U.S. and Canadian chaplaincy organizations. It defined the professional role, training, and value of chaplains in healthcare, emphasizing their contributions to holistic care and establishing shared standards across faith traditions and institutional settings. It includes the following section:

Professional chaplains offer spiritual care to all who are in need and have specialized education to mobilize spiritual resources so that patients cope more effectively. They maintain confidentiality and provide a sup-portive context within which patients can discuss their concerns. They are professionally accountable to their religious faith group, their certifying chaplaincy organization, and the employing institution. Professional chaplains and their certifying organizations demonstrate a deep commitment and sensitivity to the diverse ethnic and religious cultures found in North America.

Professional chaplains are theologically and clinically trained clergy or lay persons whose work reflects:

- Sensitivity to multi-cultural and multi-faith realities
- Respect for patients' spiritual or religious preferences
- Understanding of the impact of illness on individuals and their caregivers
- Knowledge of healthcare organizational structure and dynamics
- Accountability as part of a professional patient care team
- Accountability to their faith groups

=== Functions ===
The following comes from the foundational document published in 2001 commonly referred to Chaplaincy White Paper of 2000.

1. When religious beliefs and practices are tightly interwoven with cultural contexts, chaplains constitute a powerful reminder of the healing, sustaining, guiding, and reconciling power of religious faith.
2. Professional chaplains reach across faith group boundaries and do not proselytize.
3. They provide supportive spiritual care through empathic listening, demonstrating an understanding of persons in distress.
4. Professional chaplains serve as members of patient care teams.
5. Professional chaplains design and lead religious ceremonies of worship and ritual.
6. Professional chaplains lead or participate in healthcare ethics programs.
7. Professional chaplains educate the healthcare team and community regarding the relationship of religious and spiritual issues to institutional service.
8. Professional chaplains act as mediator and reconciler, functioning in ways for those who need a voice in the healthcare system.
9. Professional chaplains may serve as contact persons to arrange assessment for the appropriateness and coordination of complementary therapies.
10. Professional chaplains and their certifying organizations encourage and support research activities to assess the effectiveness of providing spiritual care.

=== BCC - Board Certified Chaplain ===
In the United States, health care chaplains/spiritual care providers who are board-certified meeting the following requirements:

1. completed a minimum of four units (1,600 hours) of Clinical Pastoral Education training
2. a Masters of Divinity degree (or its equivalent)
3. faith group ordination or commissioning, faith group endorsement
4. demonstrated mastering of the 29 Common Qualifications and Competencies by first submitting extensive written work and then sitting before a Certification Committee.
5. 2,000 hours of work experience.

The Spiritual Care Association (SCA), the Association of Professional Chaplains (APC), the Clinical Pastoral Education International, Inc. (CPEI), the National Association of Catholic Chaplains (NACC), Neshama - Association of Jewish Chaplains (NAJC), the Association of Certified Christian Chaplains (ACCC), National Association of VA Chaplains (NAVAC), the National Association of VA Catholic Chaplains, and the World Spiritual Health Organization (WSHO) are among the largest and most prominent Board Certifying Bodies in the US. As of 2026, two educating and certifying bodies are affiliated with the Association of Theological Schools in the United States and Canada, the Association for Clinical Pastoral Education (ACPE), an affiliate of the APC, and the WSHO. The CPEI is accredited by the Distance Education Accrediting Commission. The US Department of Veterans Affairs recognizes six certifying bodies, the ACCC, APC, NACC, NAJC, NAVAC, and the SCA. These groups use the Common Qualifications and Competencies for Professional Chaplains as the basis of their certification process. Currently, there are more than 10,000 professional chaplains in the US.

=== Outside the United States ===
In Canada, health care chaplains may be certified by the Canadian Association for Spiritual Care. Two bodies providing education and/or certification are affiliated with the Association of Theological Schools in the United States and Canada, ACPE, an affiliate of the APC, and the WSHO.

In the UK, health care chaplains are employed by their local NHS Trust (Health Boards in Scotland and Wales) or by charities associated with delivering health care such as a hospice or private hospital. The NHS in England publishes occasional guidance on chaplaincy practice. UK Chaplains are drawn from a range of faith and belief backgrounds, and are not necessarily ordained or a recognised faith leader. In Scotland Healthcare Chaplaincy developed to be 'generic' from 2002 onwards; that is the chaplaincy provides spiritual care to all people and chaplains do not represent a faith or belief group. They may work on a full-time and part-time basis, and some work unpaid but with formal recognition for a faith or belief group regarding their training and status and may be termed honorary chaplain. The term Voluntary Chaplain is frowned on. The largest professional body for the UK is the College of Health Care Chaplains. Scotland historically had a distinct professional body, the Scottish Association of Chaplains in Healthcare (SACH) but this has since dissolved. Northern Ireland also has the Healthcare Chaplains Association. Membership of the College of Health Care Chaplains was historically not open to Catholic Priests as it carries with it the membership of the Unite Trade Union, but this changed in April 2018. Chaplains working in a palliative care setting may also choose to join the Association of Hospice and Palliative Care Chaplains. Other less formal networks also exist supporting Chaplaincy in Paediatric settings and GP based Chaplaincy.

Within the UK there is also the UK Board of Healthcare Chaplaincy (UKBHC) which has been set up in order to regulate the ministry and professional practice of health care chaplains. They publish a code of conduct which all registered chaplains are bound to abide by. The UKBHC has successfully applied to the Professional Standards Authority to be an accredited register of healthcare chaplains demonstrating that it meets the Authority's high standards in areas such as governance and training.

=== Scholarly Journals ===
Peer-reviewed journals that publish scholarly articles and research on healthcare chaplaincy include the Journal of Health Care Chaplaincy (USA), the international journal Health and Social Care Chaplaincy (UK) and the Journal of Religion and Health (US).

== Other types of chaplaincy ==
=== Education ===
School chaplains are a fixture in religious and, more recently, secular schools. In religious schools the role of the chaplain tends to be educational and liturgical. In secular schools the role of the chaplain tends to be that of a mentor and a provider of pastoral care services. Chaplains provide care for students by supporting them during times of crisis or need. Many chaplains run programs to promote the welfare of students, staff and parents including programs to help students deal with grief, anger or depression. Chaplains also build relationships with students by participating in extracurricular activities such as breakfast programs, lunchtime groups and sports groups. School chaplains can also liaise with external organizations providing support services for the school. Many schools now have pupil support departments with several mentors whose jobs are to look out for the pupils and always be there to help but they give no religious or spiritual guidance because of multiculturalism and diverse opinions on religion and beliefs. Chaplains have also been referred to as spiritual animators (also faith animators or pastoral animators) based on the French concept of animation spirituelle or spiritual care.

In Australia chaplains in state schools have, controversially, been funded by the federal government and local communities since 2007. Australian chaplains assist school communities to support the spiritual, social, and emotional well-being of their students. Chaplaincy services are provided by non denominational companies. As of August 2013 there are 2339 chaplains working in Australian secular schools, along with 512 student welfare workers. Australian schools will lose the option of appointing secular social workers under the national school chaplaincy program, for which the Abbott government has found an extra $245m in the 2014 budget funding.

Similarly, in Scotland the focus of school chaplaincy is on welfare and building positive relationships joining students on excursions and sharing meals. Chaplains are also non-denominational and act as a link between the school community and society. Like Australian chaplains it is expected that they will not proselytise.

In Ireland, chaplaincy takes a very different approach in which chaplains are expected to teach up to four hours of class instruction per week and are usually Catholic themselves. Chaplaincy duties include visiting homes, religious services, retreats and celebrations, as well as counseling.

=== Higher education ===
In higher education, chaplains are appointed by many colleges and universities, sometimes working directly for the institution, and sometimes as representatives of separate organizations that specifically work to support students, such as Hillel International for Jews or the Newman Centers for Catholics. The Catholic Church's Second Vatican Council directed in 1965 that "at universities that are not Catholic there should be associations and university centers under Catholic auspices in which priests, religious and laity, carefully selected and prepared, should give abiding spiritual and intellectual assistance to the youth of the university.

In the United States, the National Association of College and University Chaplains works to support the efforts of many of these chaplains, helping chaplains minister to the individual faith of students, faculty, and staff, while promoting inter-religious understanding. Chaplains often also oversee programs on campus that foster spiritual, ethical, religious, and political and cultural exchange, and the promotion of service.

=== Industrial chaplains ===
==== Law and police ====
Law enforcement or police chaplains work with and as part of local, regional, county, state, and national or federal law enforcement and provide a variety of services within the law enforcement community. They should not be confused with prison chaplains, whose primary ministry is to those who are incarcerated either awaiting trial or after conviction. The role of the law enforcement chaplain deals primarily with law enforcement personnel and agencies. The chaplain responds to these unique needs and challenges with religious guidance, reassuring and trustworthy presence, resources and counseling services. The law enforcement chaplain offers support to law enforcement officers, administrators, support staff, victims and their families, and occasionally even the families of accused or convicted offenders. Law enforcement chaplaincy is a ministry of presence and must have the proper training if they are working with law enforcement officers. Some ministries such as Chaplain Fellowship Ministries requires LEO chaplains to be certified in Public Safety Chaplaincy before becoming certified as a LEO chaplain. Most chaplains are uniformed and some may have a rank. They will always wear distinguishing insignia or markings to denote their chaplain rather than lawman status.

==== Fire departments ====
Chaplains working with fire departments provide the same kind of support as do chaplains working with law enforcement agencies, and sometimes face even greater danger working with the wounded in often very dangerous surroundings.

At the scene of the September 11 attacks on the World Trade Center in New York City, for example, New York City Fire Department chaplain Mychal Judge was killed by flying debris from the South Tower when he re-entered the lobby of the North Tower of the World Trade Center, shortly after administering last rites to a wounded firefighter.

==== Labor ====
Many workplace chaplains (commonly called industrial chaplains) are sponsored by labor unions, including in some cases chaplains for police and firefighters. The United Auto Workers Union (UAW) sponsors a chaplaincy program for all of its local unions. In New York City, the Electricians Union (IBEW Local 3) has affiliated Catholic, Episcopalian, Greek Orthodox and Masonic organizations with chaplains.

Union chaplains are often viewed as advantageous as they are accountable to the employees and not corporate management.

==== Ports ====
In many ports, particularly in North America and Europe, there are chaplaincy organizations providing religious and welfare services to seafarers while they are in port. This ministry typically takes the form of going aboard ships to talk with seafarers, maintaining centers near the port with chapels, spaces for relaxation, and internet, and providing transportation to seafarers on shore leave. Prominent international seafarers' ministry organizations include Stella Maris, the Mission to Seafarers, the Sailors' Society, the Deutsche Seemannsmission, and the International Christian Maritime Association.

==== Corporate ====
Some businesses, large or small, employ chaplains for their staff or clientele. Services provided may include employee assistance and counseling services; wellness seminars; conflict management and mediation; leadership and management development; and trauma/serious incident response. In 2007, 4,000 corporate chaplains were reported to be working in the U.S., with the majority being employees of specialist chaplaincy companies such as Marketplace Chaplains USA and Corporate Chaplains of America. In 2024, Corporate Chaplains of America reported serving over 2,000 workplace locations with 400 chaplains serving over 1,000,000 employees and their family members in the United States and Canada. 2014, Marketplace Chaplains USA reported employing over 2,800 chaplains in 44 states and over 960 cities. The organization added an international arm in 2006; Marketplace Chaplains International serves Canada, the U.K., Mexico and Puerto Rico. Capellania Empresarial provides corporate chaplaincy services in Paraguay. Chaplains without Borders has been providing corporate and other chaplaincy services in Australia since 2005.

=== Music ===
Some chaplains use live music as a therapeutic tool. Music can aid in healing, access core faith and emotions, and help to build rapport in the chaplaincy relationship.

=== Parliamentary ===
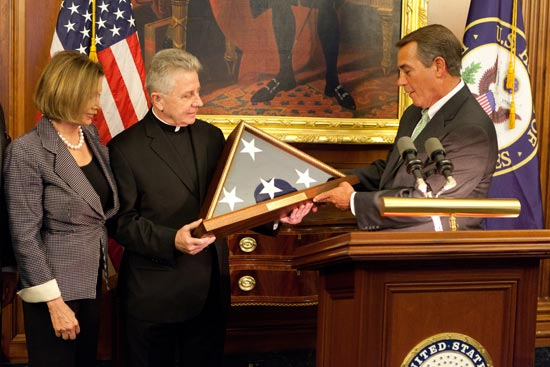
House Speaker John Boehner and Minority Leader Nancy Pelosi present a flag flown over the U.S. Capitol to Fr. Daniel Coughlin in recognition for his 11 years of service as Chaplain of the United States House of Representatives, April 2011

Some nations, including the United States and the United Kingdom, have chaplains appointed to work with parliamentary bodies, such as the Chaplain of the United States Senate, the Chaplain of the United States House of Representatives, and Chaplain to the Speaker of the House of Commons. In addition to opening proceedings with prayer, these chaplains provide pastoral counseling to congressional members, their staffs, and their families; coordinate the scheduling of guest chaplains, who offer opening prayers; arrange and sometimes conduct marriages, memorial services, and funeral services for congress, staff, and their families; and conduct or coordinate religious services, study groups, prayer meetings, holiday programs, and religious education programs, as well.

=== Royalty and nobility ===
Monarchs have held private religious services as a long-standing right along with a privilege of appointing their own chaplains to serve them and their families. Since the late medieval period, dukes and lesser ranking nobles have had a capacity to name a number of chaplains. The question of who has authority to qualify chaplains was the heart of the Investiture Controversy in medieval Germany.

=== Prison ===
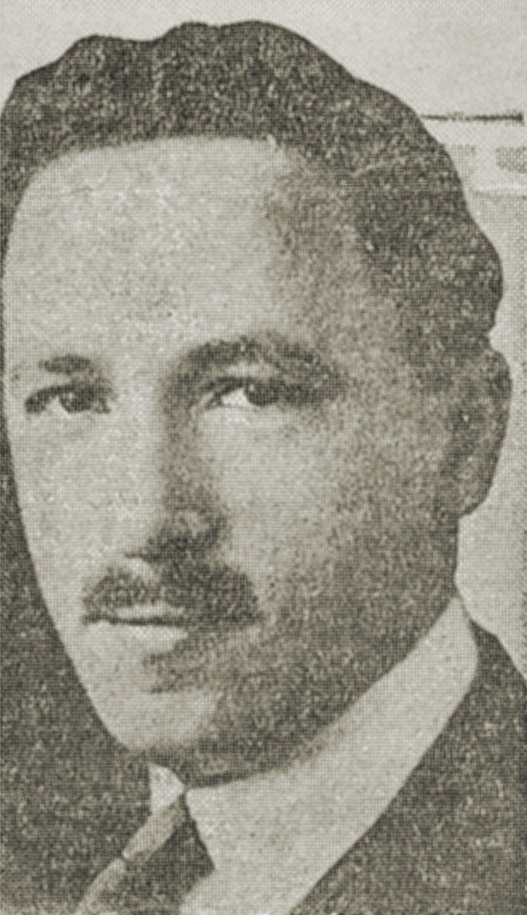
Rabbi Philip R. Alstat, c. 1920, Jewish chaplain for "The Tombs" – the Manhattan Correctional Facility – for thirty years.

Prison chaplains can be a "safety valve, through listening and pro-social intervention" in potentially explosive situations. They also reduce recidivism by linking offenders to positive community resources, and in the work they do to help offenders change their hearts, minds and directions.

Rabbi Philip R. Alstat (1891–1976), who—in addition to work as a chaplain in New York hospitals and senior citizen facilities—served for three decades as the Jewish chaplain for "The Tombs", the Manhattan Detention Facility, once described his service as follows: "My goals are the same as those of the prison authorities—to make better human beings. The only difference is that their means are discipline, security, and iron bars. Mine are the spiritual ministrations that operate with the mind and the heart."

In Canada in 2013, a $2-million contract for chaplaincy services for federal prisons was awarded to Kairos Pneuma Chaplaincy Inc., a company newly formed by five current and former federal prison chaplains. About "2,500 volunteers, many of them of minority faiths, would also continue providing services." There has however, been very little research looking at the role of chaplains and volunteers working within correctional facilities.

=== Sports ===
Chaplains to sports communities have existed since the middle of the 20th century and have significantly grown in the past 20 years. The United States, United Kingdom and Australia have well established Christian sports chaplaincy ministries.

Sports chaplains consist of people from many different walks of life. Most commonly, the chaplains are ministers or full-time Christian workers but occasionally, chaplaincy work is done without charge or any financial remuneration. Often, sports chaplains to a particular sport are former participants of that sport. This helps the chaplain to not only provide spiritual support and guidance to a player, but also to give them the ability to empathize and relate to some of the challenges facing the participant with whom they are ministering.

=== Animal ===
Veterinary chaplains serve people and their animals, ministering with regards to the spirituality associated with animals and their connections with humans. A major function is grief support and prayer. Other services include hospice support while animals are cared for near the end of their lives; support in animal health crises, including at the veterinary hospital; conducting services for animal blessings, naming/adopting ceremonies, and end of life celebration ceremonies. Veterinary chaplains may also offer sermons and spiritual guidance on the human/animal bond and our responsibilities toward animals; and some may visit nursing homes and hospitals with therapeutic animal assistants. Other veterinary chaplains may provide blessings for animal care workers; assist with human/animal communication; and offer alternative healing for animals such as animal Reiki or acupuncture.

=== Colonial ===
A colonial chaplain was appointed to a colony. The term is commonly used to refer to the chaplain appointed as a non-military chaplain to one of the Crown Colonies from the late 18th century or early 19th century. Richard Johnson (1756–1827) was the first colonial chaplain appointed to the new prison colony at New South Wales in 1786.

=== Environmental ===
Environmental chaplaincy is an emerging field within chaplaincy. Environmental chaplains (also known as eco-chaplains, Earth chaplains, nature chaplains) provide spiritual care in a way that aims to honor humanity's connection to the earth. Environmental chaplains hold many roles. They may support people working on the frontlines of issues like climate change or other environmental issues or they may support people impacted by industrial or other disasters by providing pastoral care, presence, and rituals. Environmental chaplains may also bear witness to the Earth itself and represent the merging of science and spirituality. Their role can be to "usher in a new conscience and consciousness to find contentment, the appreciation of inner riches over outer wealth, quality over quantity" using universally appreciated values, such as honesty and vision. Sarah Vekasi created a vision of eco-chaplaincy inspired by Joanna Macy's The Work that Reconnects, and saw eco-chaplaincy as a path to facilitating the "Great Turning," which is described as the turning away from a business-as-usual way of being and turning toward a life-sustaining way that protects people and the planet.

=== Cruise ===
Working on board cruise ships, cruise chaplains provide pastoral and spiritual support to both passengers and crew members. With the co-operation of cruise companies, chaplains normally stay on board for the specific duration of a cruise. Catholic seafarers' charity Apostleship of the Sea currently deploys chaplains on board P&O Cruises and Cunard Line ships during the Christmas and Easter periods. While ministering to passengers are part of Apostleship of the Sea's chaplains' role, their main focus is the welfare of the crew, who can often spend many months at sea away from home.

=== Domestic ===
A domestic chaplain was a chaplain attached to a noble household in order to grant the family a degree of self-sufficiency in religion. The chaplain was freed from any obligation to reside in a particular place so could travel with the family, internationally if necessary, and minister to their spiritual needs. Further, the family could appoint a chaplain who reflected their own doctrinal views. Domestic chaplains performed family christenings, funerals and weddings and were able to conduct services in the family's private chapel, excusing the nobility from attending public worship.

In feudal times most laymen, and for centuries even most noblemen, were poorly educated and the chaplain would also be an important source of scholarship in the household, tutoring children and providing counsel to the family on matters broader than religion. Before the advent of the legal profession, modern bureaucracy and civil service, the literate clergy were often employed as secretarial staff, as in a chancery. Hence the term clerk, derived from Latin clericus (clergyman). This made them very influential in temporal affairs. There was also a moral impact since they heard the confessions of the elite.

The domestic chaplain was an important part of the life of the peerage in England from the reign of Henry VIII to the middle of the 19th century. Up until 1840, Anglican domestic chaplains were regulated by law and enjoyed the substantial financial advantage of being able to purchase a license to hold two benefices simultaneously while residing in neither.

Many monarchies and major noble houses had, or still have, several domestic or private chaplains as part of their Ecclesiastical Household, either following them or attached to a castle or other residence. Queen Elizabeth II had 36 Anglican chaplains, in addition to chaplains extraordinary and honorary chaplains appointed to minister to her. Castles with attached chaplains generally had at least one Chapel Royal, sometimes as significant as a cathedral. A modern example is St George's Chapel, Windsor Castle, also the home of the Order of the Garter.

=== Other ===
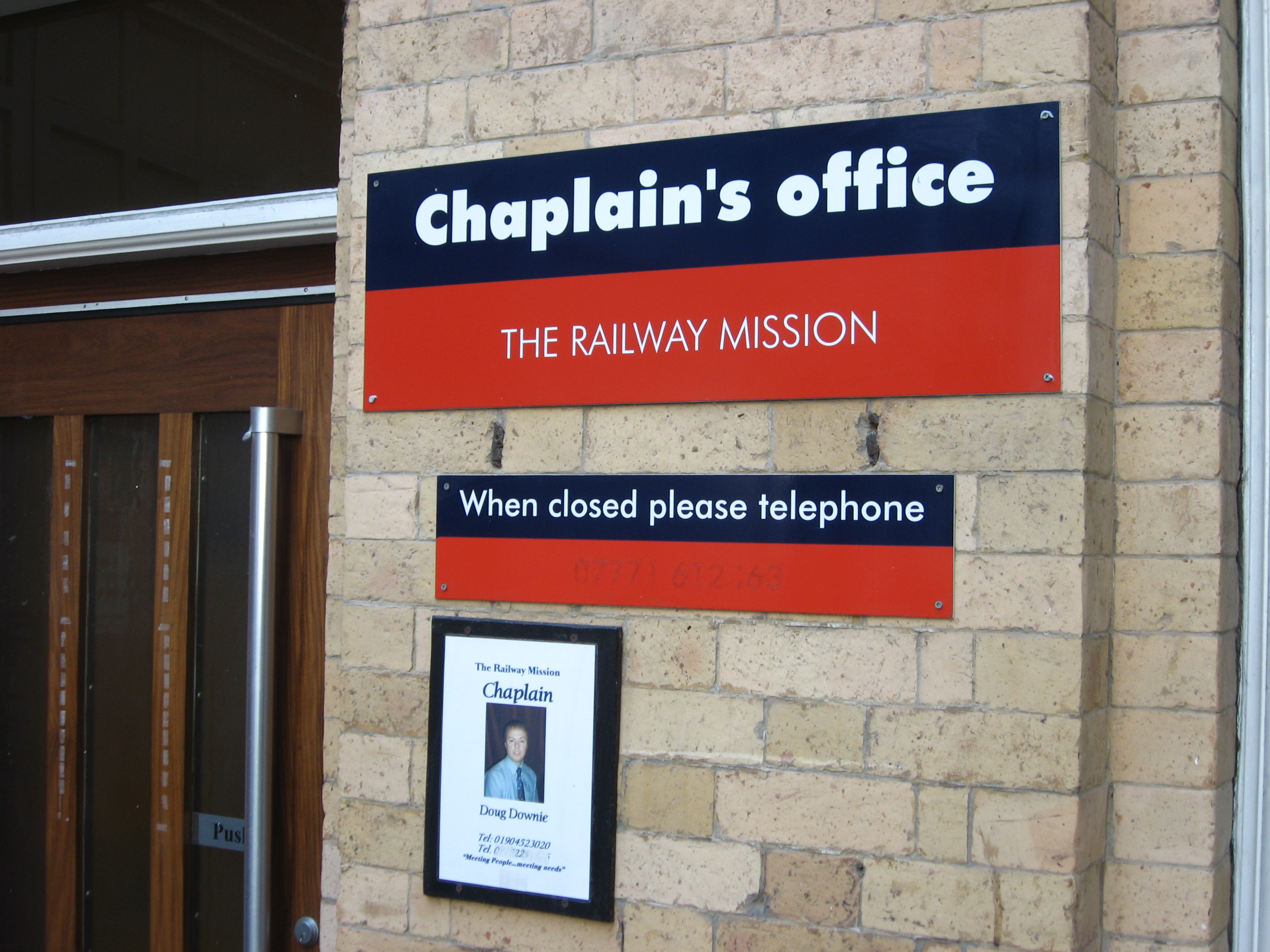
Chaplain's Office, York railway station

There are also chaplains to private clubs, television or radio stations, family, community teams, groups such as Boys' and Girls' Brigade companies and Scout troops, airports, cruise ships, nightclubs, and theaters.

The term can also refer to priests attached to Catholic convents. There is also the position of Chaplain of His Holiness, a title granted by the Pope to certain priests who become part of the Papal Household and work with the Papal Chapel. Prior to 1968 they were called Supernumerary Privy Chamberlains.

In German-speaking countries, the German "Kaplan" is often translated as "chaplain", but in fact the two words are false friends. "Kaplan" as generally used in German-speaking countries is better translated as curate in British usage, or assistant pastor in American usage.

In the Church of England and other Anglican churches, a Bishop's "examining chaplain(s)" are those (usually priests) who examine candidates for ordination and advise the bishop as to their suitability. This role, and ordination processes, have varied greatly in the churches' history and between the churches.

At the University of Oxford, the term Caplan is used for the position equivalent to president, for the head of the Cymdeithas Dafydd ap Gwilym, (Dafydd ap Gwilym Society) the Oxford University Welsh society, named after the 14th-century Welsh poet, Dafydd ap Gwilym.

Gallery

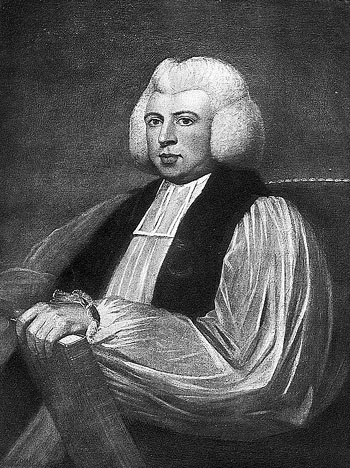
Samuel Provoost, First Chaplain of the Continental Congress, 1789

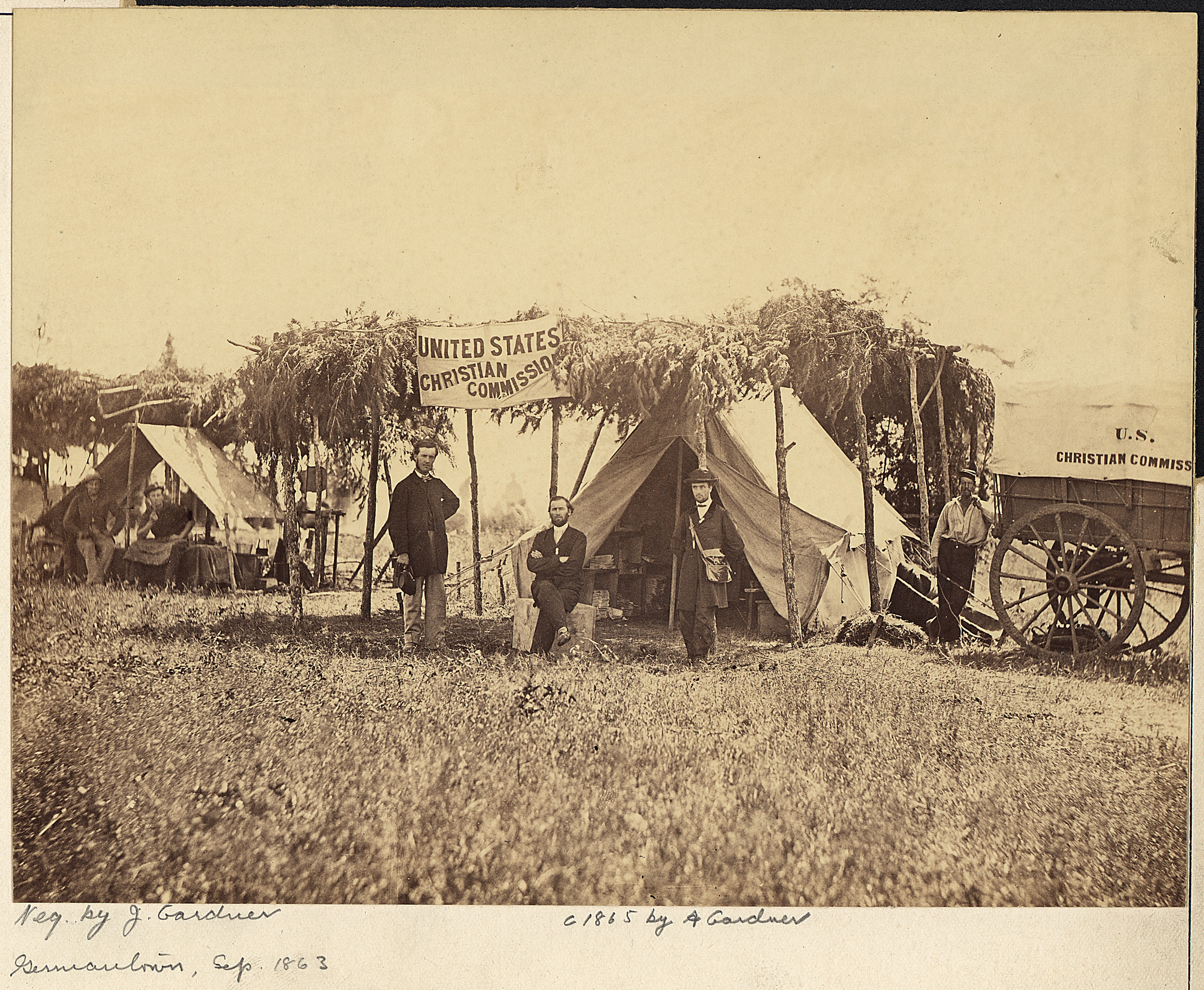
Maryland, Germantown. Headquarters Christian Commission in the Field, 1863

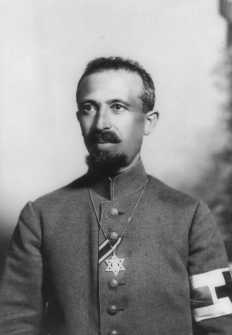
Military Field Rabbi Dr. Aaron Tänzer during World War I, with the ribbon of the Iron Cross. The brassard of the red cross shows him as noncombatant. He wears the Star of David as insignium

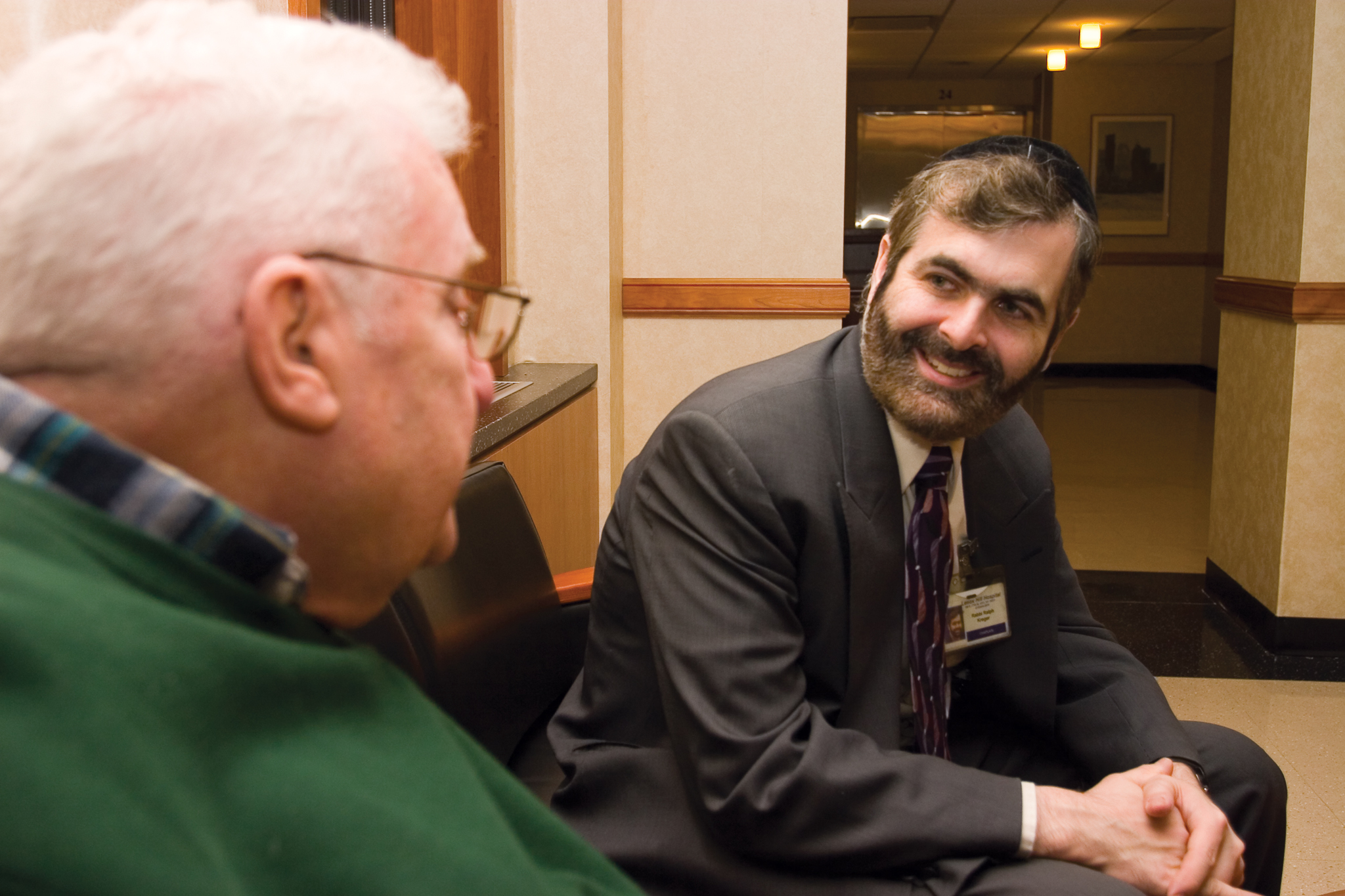
Rabbi Ralph Kreger, BCC with a patient's family member at Lenox Hill Hospital (part of the North Shore LIJ health system)

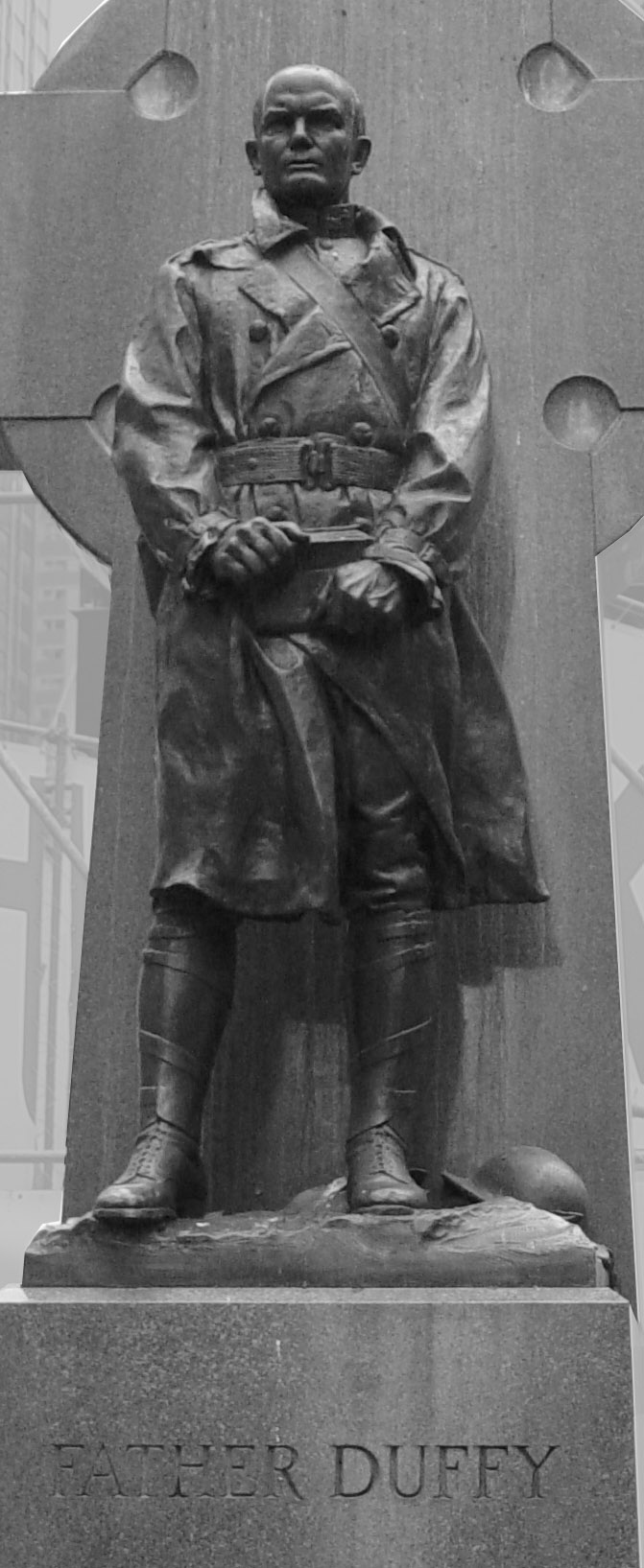
Monument to Chaplain Father Francis Duffy in Times Square (click for obverse text)

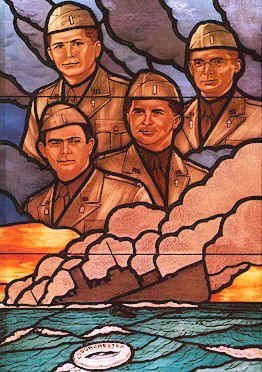
'Four Chaplains' stained glass window, U.S. Pentagon

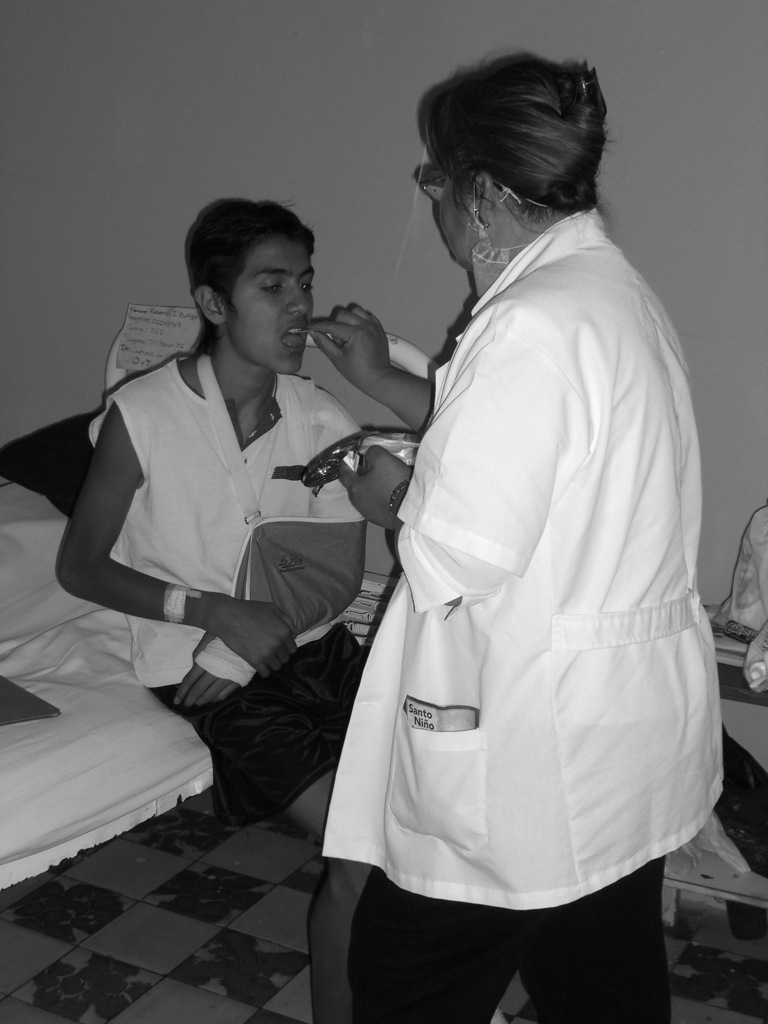
A hospitalized man receives communion from a chaplain, Guadalajara, Mexico

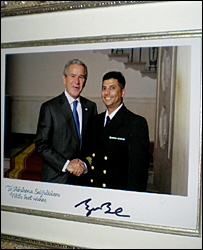
President George W. Bush congratulates Navy Chaplain, Imam Abuhena Saifulislam, the first U.S. Navy Muslim chaplain assigned to the Marine Corps

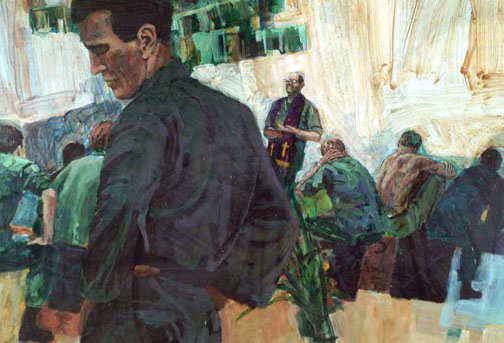
Religious Services 1st Cav AKA Thy Rod and Thy Staff, They Comfort Me by Paul Rickert, U. S. Army Vietnam Combat Artists Program, Team IX (CAT I 1966). Courtesy National Museum of the U. S. Army.

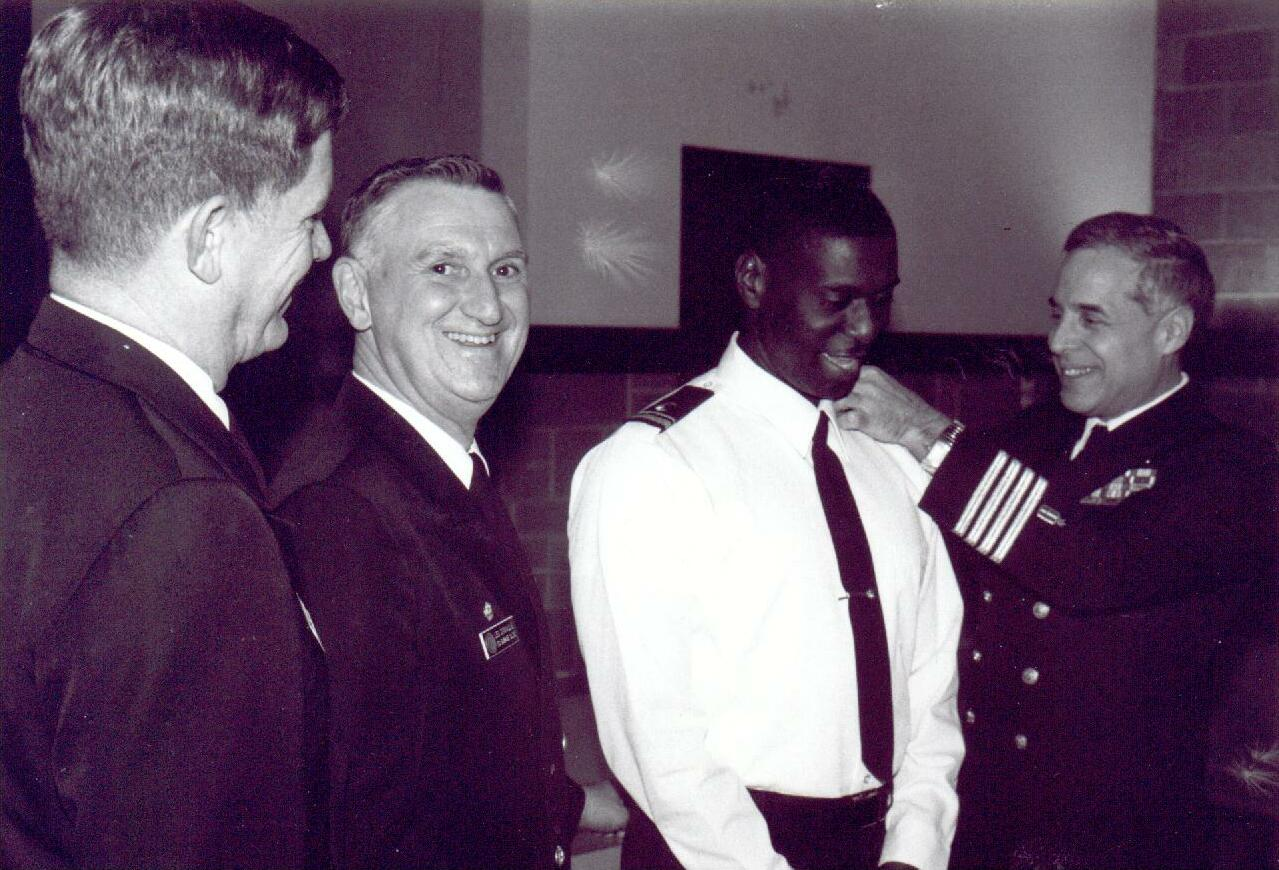
Frocking ceremony for U.S. Navy's first Muslim chaplain, when Navy (rabbi) Chaplain Arnold Resnicoff attaches new shoulder boards with Muslim Chaplain crescent insignia to uniform of Imam Monje Malak Abd al-Muta Noel Jr, 1996.

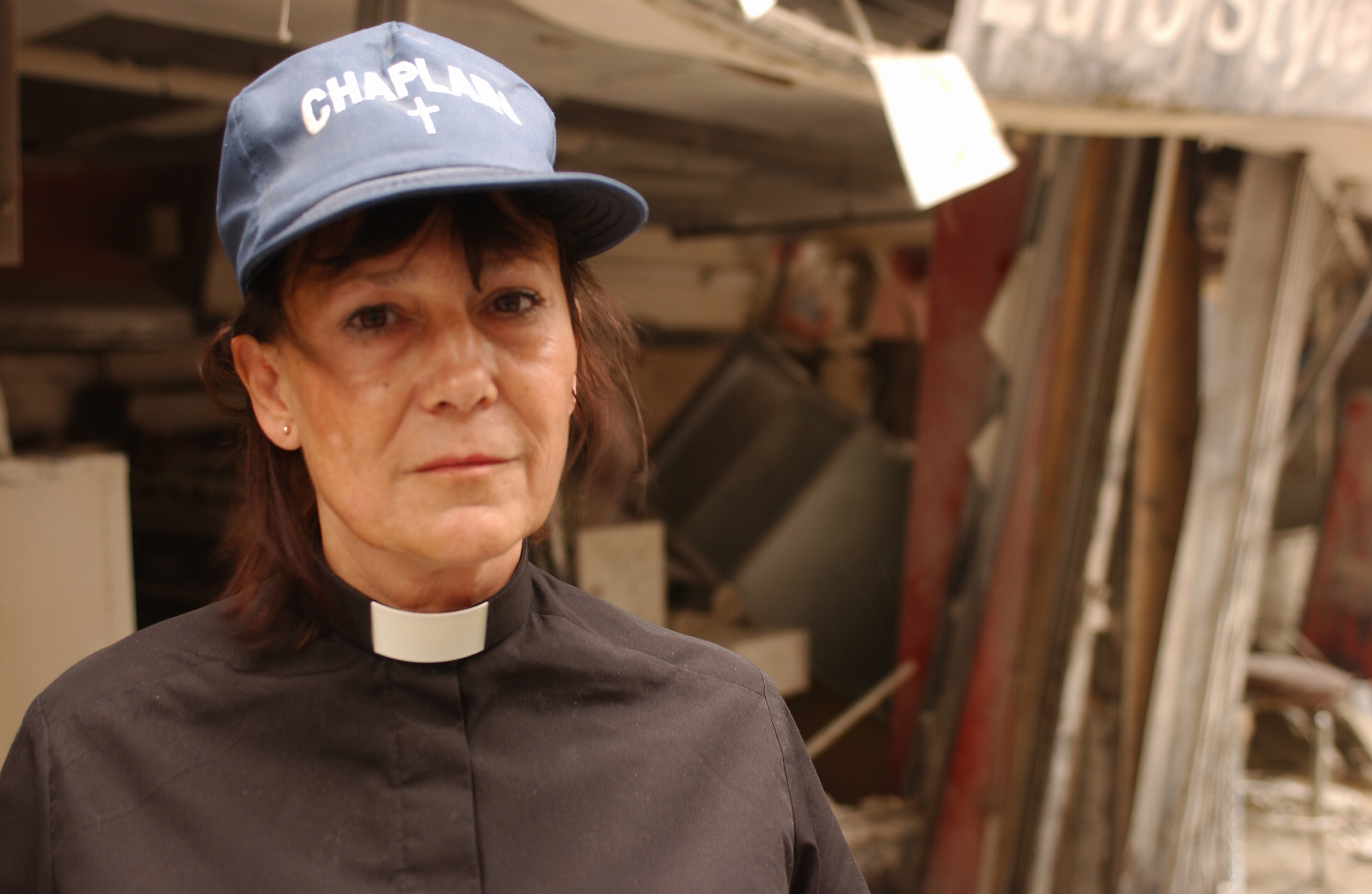
An American chaplain in September 2001.

== See also ==
- Religion in United States prisons
- United States military chaplain symbols
