= Vaad Hatzalah =

Organization to rescue Jews in Europe from the Holocaust

- Founded: November 1939; 87 years ago
- Purpose: rescue Jews in Europe from the Holocaust

Vaad Hatzalah (the Rescue Committee or Committee for Rescuing) was an organization to rescue Jews in Europe from the Holocaust, which was founded in November 1939 by the Union of Orthodox Rabbis of the United States and Canada (Agudath Harabbanim).

The organization was originally named Emergency Committee for War-Torn Yeshivas and is often referred to as "the Rescue Committee" also formally named: Vaad ha-Hatzala in Hebrew.

== Activities ==
The Agudath HaRabbanim (Union of Orthodox Rabbis), led by Rabbi Eliezer Silver of Cincinnati, founded an organization specifically devoted to the rescue of European Jews called the Vaad Hatzalah ("Rescue Committee"). The Vaad was supported by all of Orthodox Jewry (Agudath Israel, Young Israel, Mizrachi, etc.). It was led by three of the greatest Sages of America: Rabbi Eliezer Silver, Rabbi Avraham Kalmanowitz, and, after he was brought to the United States through the Vaad in 1941, Rabbi Aharon Kotler. The leaders of the Vaad were willing to do anything to save their fellow Jews, recognizing that saving lives was the priority.

For example, the Polish government-in-exile ambassador in Bern, Aleksander Ładoś, sent coded cables to New York City on behalf of the Vaad and related Jewish organizations. The United States State Department had issued orders to block messages coming from Europe regarding news of the Nazis extermination of the Jews.

== Archives ==
The records of the Vaad Hatzala can be examined at Yeshiva University Archives. A guide to the collection may be viewed at the website of Yeshiva University Libraries.

== See also ==
- Survivors' Talmud
