= Central Committee of the Liberated Jews =

Organization representing Jewish displaced persons in post-WWII American Zone, Germany

- Abbreviation: ZK
- Formation: July 1, 1945; 81 years ago
- Founder: Dr. Zalman Grinberg, Rabbi Abraham Klausner
- Dissolved: December 17, 1950; 75 years ago
- Type: Non-profit organization
- Legal status: Defunct
- Headquarters: Deutsches Museum, Munich
- Chairman: Zalman Grinberg (1945-1946), David Treger (1946), Abraham Treger (1946-1948)

The Central Committee of the Liberated Jews (German: Zentralkomitee der befreiten Juden, ZK; Yiddish: צענטראל קאמיטעט פון די באפרייטע יידן, romanized: Tsentral-Kamitet fun di Bafreyte Yidn) was an organization which represented Jewish displaced persons in the American Zone of the post-World War II Germany, during 1945–1950.

The organization was founded on July 1, 1945, through the efforts of Dr. Zalman Grinberg, former director of the Kovno Ghetto hospital; rabbi Abraham Klausner, a chaplain of the US Army; and others. On September 7, 1946, the committee was recognized as "the legal and democratic representation of the liberated Jews in the American zone" by the American military government in Germany.

The first chairman was Zalman Gringberg, succeeded by David Treger (in 1946) after Grinberg's emigration to Palestine and then by Abraham Treger. Abraham Treger served as the committee's chairman between 1946 and 1948 and then emigrated with his wife Ida to Haifa, Israel.

== History ==
In the American sector, the Jewish community across many Displaced Persons camps organized itself rapidly for purposes of representation and advocacy. Working committees were established in each DP camp, and on July 1, 1945, the committees met for a founding session of a federation for Jewish DP camp committees in Feldafing. The organization for this meeting was facilitated by US Army Chaplain Abraham Klaunser, as movements between the DP camps were not always possible, as the US armed forces were controlling the movement of survivors. The session also included representatives of the Jewish Brigade and the Allied military administration. It resulted in the formation of a provisional council and an executive committee chaired by Zalman Grinberg.

The Central Committee declared its dissolution on December 17, 1950, at its headquarters, the Deutsches Museum in Munich. Of the original group that founded the committee, only rabbi Samuel Snieg remained for the dissolution. All the others had already emigrated, most of them to Israel. Rabbi Snieg had remained to complete the first full edition of the Talmud published in Europe after the Holocaust, the so-called Survivors' Talmud.

== See also ==
- Bricha
