= Samuel A. Snieg =

Samuel A. (Shmuel Abba) Snieg (1899—1970) was chief rabbi in the American Zone of the Allied-occupied Germany, a survivor of the Dachau concentration camp, and an organizer of the printing of the Survivors' Talmud.

Snieg was raised in Rokiškis, Lithuania, and helped found Yeshiva Eitz Chaim in Lithuania. He was later a Rabbi for soldiers in Lithuania.

== Family ==
His wife, Chana (nee Hurowitz), perished in the Stutthof concentration camp. After the war, he remarried and his second wife, Chaya Leah, died in 1963.
