= Zalman Grinberg =

- זלמן גרינברג
- Born: September 4, 1912; Kaunas, Russian Empire
- Died: August 8, 1983 (aged 70); Mineola, New York, USA
- Occupation: Physician
- Spouse: Eva Klein
- Children: 3 sons

Zalman Grinberg (Hebrew: זלמן גרינברג; September 29, 1912 – August 8, 1983) was a medical doctor who served as the chairman for the Central Committee of Liberated Jews in the American sector of Germany and Austria after World War II.

== Early life ==
Zalman Grinberg was born on September 4, 1912, in Lithuania. He was educated as a medical doctor with a specialty in radiology. He was imprisoned in the concentration camp at Dachau.

== Career ==
Shortly after the war, Zalman led a group of 800 nearly dead Dachau prisoners in search of help, eventually finding himself near the monastery of St. Ottilien. There, managed to set up a hospital at the monastery, recruiting nurses and physicians among the concentration camp survivors.

Subsequently, he was appointed to the Central Committee ("ZK"), which was seated in Munich. He moved to Israel and became the director of the Beilinson Hospital in Petah Tikva. He emigrated to the United States in 1955, where he became a psychiatrist.

== Personal life ==
He was married to Eva Klein. They had three sons, Yair, Moshe and Raffi.

== Death ==
He died in Mineola, New York.
