= Survivors' Talmud =

The Survivors' Talmud (also known as the U.S. Army Talmud or the Munich Talmud) was an edition of the Talmud published in the U.S. Zone of Allied-occupied Germany on behalf of Holocaust survivors housed in displaced persons (DP) camps. It was the only known edition of the Talmud to be published by a government body. While the project was approved in September 1946, delays in acquiring a complete set of the Talmud to work from, as well as obtaining printing materials, pushed off publication until 1949–1950, by which time most of the survivors had emigrated from Europe. Extant copies of the Survivors' Talmud are now collector's items.

== Background ==
At the end of World War II, 250,000 to 300,000 Jewish survivors remained in Western and Central Europe, housed in DP camps. These survivors, and the schools and yeshivas that sprang up to educate them, were in desperate need of sefarim (Torah books), siddurim (Jewish prayer books), and machzorim (High Holy Days prayer books). The Vaad Hatzalah, an Orthodox rescue organization founded in 1939 to save rabbis and yeshiva students in Poland and Lithuania, printed hundreds of thousands of copies of these and other religious books to meet the survivors' needs, including 10,000 pocket-size editions of individual tractates of the Talmud.

At the same time, a group of rabbis led by Samuel A. Snieg, chief rabbi of the U.S. Zone, and Samuel Jakob Rose, both survivors of the Dachau concentration camp, conceived the idea of printing an entire, full-size Talmud in Germany as a sign of the Jewish people's survival despite efforts to annihilate them. Snieg connected with Rabbi Philip S. Bernstein, a New York Reform rabbi who served as adviser on Jewish affairs to General Joseph McNarney, Military Governor of Occupied Germany, and Bernstein arranged for the rabbis to meet with McNarney. Bernstein summed up the rabbis' request in a memorandum: "[Would the army provide] the tools for the perpetuation of religion, for the students who crave these texts spring from the strongly Orthodox element? ... A 1947 edition ... published in Germany under the auspices of the American Army of Occupation, would be an historic work". The general approved the request.

The signed agreement, titled "Agreement Between the American Joint Distribution Committee and the Rabbinical Council, U.S. Zone Germany, Regarding the Printing of the New Edition of the Talmud" and dated 11 September 1946, called for the project to be supervised by the American Jewish Joint Distribution Committee (the "Joint") and the U.S. Army, and for expenses to be covered by the Joint and the German government. According to the agreement, 3,000 copies of a 16-volume set of the Talmud would be printed within one year. The Talmud project would be managed by a team of government and military staffers.

== Project history ==
Before printing could begin, a complete set of the Talmud had to be found to use as a prototype. In the 1930s and early 1940s, the Nazi government had stolen, looted and burned many of the religious books belonging to German Jews, and not one complete set of the Talmud could be located in Western Europe. A complete set was difficult to find in America, too, since yeshiva students had relied on editions printed in Poland. Finally, two complete sets were found in New York and sent to Germany by the Joint Distribution Committee.

The U.S. Army acquisitioned the Carl Winter Printing Plant in Heidelberg, Germany, which had produced Nazi propaganda literature during the war. However, the sheer size of the project – which required "millions of sheets of paper, tens of thousands of meters of bonds and strips of linen paper, cord, typesetting, cardboard, photoengraving equipment, and a permit for electricity use" – made the army rethink its commitment. In February 1947 the project was scaled down from 3,000 sets to 50 sets. (Later, the Joint Distribution Committee financed the printing of several hundred additional sets.)

Another delay ensued when a material called collodion, which enables the transfer of page images to zinc photographic plates, was found to have been banned during the war and was only available in the city of Zwickau in the Soviet occupation zone. As the Cold War had begun, Zwickau was unreachable, so the collodion had to be ordered from America. Meanwhile, Germany's currency crisis delayed the German's government's funding of the project until the implementation of economic reforms in spring 1948.

When printing began, it became clear that the original projection of 16 volumes per set was inadequate, so 19 volumes were planned for each set. The first copies were finally printed in May 1949. In a moving ceremony on 13 May 1949 in the Berlin headquarters of the U.S. Army, Rabbi Snieg presented the first copy of the Talmud to General Lucius Clay, Military Governor of the U.S. Occupation Zone in Germany, with the words, "I bless your hand in presenting to you this volume embodying the highest spiritual wisdom of our people". Chaim Weizmann, first president of Israel, also received a copy.

The final run was completed on 16 November 1950. Approximately 500 sets were printed.

== Title page and dedications ==
The title page of each volume depicts a Nazi slave labor camp surrounded by barbed wire. Above it are palm trees and scenes in Israel. These images are connected by the Hebrew words: "From bondage to freedom, from darkness to a great light".

In the first volume of the Talmud, this dedication appeared in English:

In 1946 we turned to the American Army Commander to assist us in the publication of the Talmud. In all the years of exile it has often happened that various governments and forces have burned Jewish books. Never did any publish them for us. This is the first time in Jewish history that a government has helped in the publication of the Talmud, which is the source of our being and the length of our days. The Army of the United States saved us from death, protects us in this land, and through their aid does the Talmud appear again in Germany.

Each volume of the Talmud also included this dedication in English:

This edition of the Talmud is dedicated to the United States Army. The army played a major role in the rescue of the Jewish people from total annihilation and after the defeat of Hitler bore the major burden of sustaining the DPs of the Jewish faith. This special edition of the Talmud published in the very land where, but a short time ago, everything Jewish and of Jewish inspiration was anathema, will remain a symbol of the indestructibility of the Torah. The Jewish DPs will never forget the generous impulses and the unprecedented humanitarianism of the American forces, to whom they owe so much.

(Signed) Rabbi Samuel A. Snieg, Chief Rabbi of the U.S. Zone

== Distribution ==
Although approximately 650 complete sets were printing, only around 600 were ultimately bound, due to post-war logistical and resource constraints. Many of these volumes were eventually worn out through daily study and were buried in accordance with Jewish law, leaving only a small number of surviving sets in circulation today.

By the time the Survivors' Talmud was printed, only 10,000 to 15,000 Jewish survivors remained in Germany. The Joint Distribution Committee and the German government decided to keep 40 sets in German libraries and other institutions, and to send the rest of the printing to Jewish communal organizations and libraries around the world. In the United States, a committee headed by Rabbi Leo Jung of Yeshiva University was responsible for choosing recipients; it sent complete sets of the Talmud to some religious and secular institutions in the U.S. and Canada, and single volumes to others. It also gave volumes to Holocaust survivors and people who had been involved in the Talmud project.

Because of its limited printing, the Survivors' Talmud became a collector's item. Few complete sets of the Survivors' Talmud are still extant. In 2001, one volume was exhibited at the Chrysler Museum of Art and thereafter went on a national tour. Also in 2001, the American Jewish Historical Society, in conjunction with the Tidewater Jewish Foundation of Norfolk, Virginia, prepared a traveling exhibition for U.S. military bases around the world, telling the story of the Survivors' Talmud and the role of the U.S. Army in its publication. In 2005, a copy of the Survivors' Talmud was part of a Yeshiva University Museum exhibition entitled "Printing The Talmud: From Bomberg To Schottenstein".

== See also ==
- Vaad Hatzalah
