= Rosensaft =

Rosensaft is a German surname. Notable people with the surname include:

- Hadassah Rosensaft (1912–1997), Polish holocaust survivor
- Josef Rosensaft (1911–1975), Holocaust survivor
- Menachem Z. Rosensaft (born 1948), American attorney
