= Joseph Asher =

American rabbi

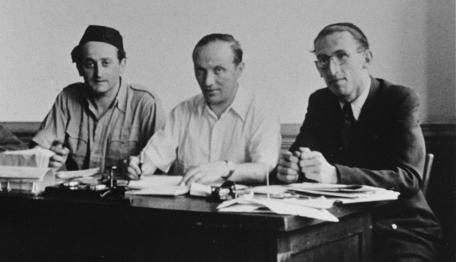
Left to right: Rabbi Zvi Helfgott (later Rabbi Zvi Asaria), Josef Rosensaft and Rabbi Joseph Asher, members of the Central Jewish Committee for the British Zone of Germany. Photo taken at Bergen-Belsen, probably in 1947

Joseph Asher (1921–1990) was an American rabbi born in Germany, known for his advocacy of reconciliation between the Jews and the Germans in the post-Holocaust era, and for his support for the civil rights movement in the United States. He was senior rabbi at Congregation Emanu-El in San Francisco for 19 years.

== Family ==
Joseph Asher was born Joseph Ansbacher on January 7, 1921, in Heilbronn-am-Neckar, Germany. He changed his surname as early as 1945.

He was the sixth generation of rabbis in his family. His father, Jonah Ansbacher (1880–1967) was an Orthodox rabbi who had received a doctorate from the University of Erlangen, writing a thesis on a 13th-century Arab cosmologist. His father was ordained by Rabbi Solomon Breuer and he was an ardent follower of Rabbi Samson Raphael Hirsch, founder of the Torah im Derech Eretz trend in Judaism. Joseph Asher left the Orthodox Judaism of his ancestors and later became a Reform rabbi.

== Education ==
After his father received a rabbinic appointment, the Ansbacher family moved to Wiesbaden in 1925, where Joseph attended the Staatliche Gymnasium. When the Nazis took power in Germany in January 1933, he was one of only seven Jews in a student body of around 600, and the only Jew in his class. He endured three years of harassment including an antisemitic insult carved into the top of his desk, and other students singing popular songs calling for the murder of the Jews. In 1936, all Jewish students were expelled from the public schools, and his parents sent him to the Talmud Torah school in Hamburg, led by Rabbi Joseph Carlebach, where he graduated in spring, 1938. Among the frequent guest lecturers in his senior year was Martin Buber.

Because of the severely deteriorating conditions for Jews in Germany, his family had obtained exit visas in 1933 to be used at the appropriate time. His family sent Joseph to London after his graduation in 1938 to begin rabbinical college. He attended Etz Chaim Yeshiva in London and Jews' College (now the London School of Jewish Studies). After the war, he finished his studies at Hebrew Union College in Cincinnati, Ohio. His semikhah described him as shalselet rabbanim, that is, a member of a chain of rabbis in a long family tradition.

== World War II ==
On Kristallnacht, November 9, 1938, the Nazis began open war against the Jews, and his father's synagogue in Wiesbaden was vandalized and shut down. While heading to the railroad station in an attempt to escape, his father was arrested by the Gestapo, confined to Buchenwald for ten weeks, and then released when he agreed to use his visa and leave Germany forever. His parents arrived as refugees in London in February 1939.

After the British defeat at Dunkirk on June 4, 1940, a wave of xenophobia against German refugees swept across Great Britain, and all of them were arrested, including the Jews and other anti-Nazis. His father was interned on the Isle of Man. Joseph was confined in an internment camp at Huyton, and shortly thereafter loaded onto the troop ship HMT Dunera, along with over 2,000 other anti-Nazi refugees. The ship sailed for Australia on July 10, 1940. He described conditions on the 57-day voyage as "cruel and sadistic" as British guards frequently beat prisoners with rifle butts, and plundered their belongings. It was "the most horrendous experience of his life." After the emaciated prisoners arrived in Sydney, they were confined to internment camps until the Japanese attack on Pearl Harbor and the Philippines in December 1941.

The prisoners were then allowed to enlist in the Australian Army, where Joseph served as a chaplain. He met his wife Fae in Australia.

== Rabbinic career ==
Upon his discharge from military service, he served at the Melbourne Liberal Synagogue as assistant to Rabbi Hermann Sanger, who helped resettle Jewish refugees in Australia. He then went on to serve the Hobart Hebrew Congregation, where he was introduced at a centenary celebration for the synagogue. Asher immigrated to the United States in 1947, and served at synagogues in Olean, New York; Sarasota, Florida; and then in Tuscaloosa, Alabama from 1956 to 1958. He served as rabbi of Temple Emmanuel in Greensboro, North Carolina from 1958 to 1968, and at Congregation Emanu-El in San Francisco from 1967 until his retirement in 1986 as rabbi emeritus.

== German-Jewish relations after the Holocaust ==
In London, Asher had established a friendship with Lily Montagu CBE of the World Union for Progressive Judaism. In 1947, she recommended him to Leo Baeck, the organization's president, as an emissary to visit various German cities to investigate the status of the Jews in the immediate postwar period. He spent six weeks assessing the needs of displaced persons, including a lengthy visit to Bergen-Belsen. Everywhere, he found nothing but devastation and despair. "The human eye cannot fathom such horrible sights as I had to see", he later wrote about that trip.

A 1955 trip to Germany led him to begin to consider a "re-orientation of the Jewish relationship with Germany". In 1961, motivated by the worldwide attention paid to the Adolf Eichmann trial in Israel, he began openly speaking about the Holocaust and the future of the relationship between Germany and the Jews.

Asher visited Germany again at the invitation of the German government in 1964, to learn what the German educational system taught students about the Jews. He visited his alma mater gymnasium, as well as the Max Planck Institute, and met with the Commissioners of Education of the Federal Republic of Germany. He described his experiences in an article he wrote for Look magazine, called "A Rabbi Asks: Isn't It Time We Forgave the Germans?"

Although many people criticized Asher for this article, Berlin Mayor Willy Brandt responded favorably, as did the Union of American Hebrew Congregations. In 1965, Rabbi Asher led a contingent of four German-speaking rabbis, who met with over 8000 German teachers in training, and helped the German school system develop its first curriculum for secondary schools covering the Holocaust.

He explained the thinking behind his work in Germany in an interview published in the Aufbau on March 11, 1966: "A new generation is growing up that was not born when the horrible crime was committed and for which they cannot be held responsible. The only positive thing we can do is to acquaint them with the Jews, their teachings, customs, and history, which they have not had the opportunity to know."

As the years passed, he repeatedly visited Judaic studies programs in German universities, and late in life became a visiting professor at the Kirchliche Hochschule in Berlin. He served on an international committee of scholars to help design a memorial at the Wannsee Villa, where the Nazi leadership planned the Final Solution in January 1942.

In 1989, the German government awarded him the Grand Cross of Merit.

In 1980, he was appointed to the United States Holocaust Memorial Council chartered by the U.S. Congress to plan the United States Holocaust Memorial Museum. The museum opened in Washington, D.C., in 1993, three years after his death.

== Civil rights movement ==
In 1958, he became rabbi of Temple Emanuel in Greensboro, North Carolina. On February 1, 1960, the Greensboro sit-ins began, an effort to desegregate the lunch counter at the local Woolworth's store. He was one of only two local white clergymen who collaborated with black community leaders and black clergymen in support of racial tolerance and desegregation, including the sit-ins. This sit-in movement spread throughout the southern states, leading in many communities to progress toward desegregation, and increasing political pressure on the federal government. The Civil Rights Act of 1964 made segregation of public accommodations illegal. As a rabbi in the deep South, he did not hesitate to speak out against racial discrimination in the workplace, even when the employers were Jewish.

Rabbi Asher was wary of militant extremism. In San Francisco, he refused to share a podium with radical minister Jim Jones, who went on to mass suicide at Jonestown.

== Israeli-Palestinian conflict ==
Rabbi Asher supported reconciliation between Israelis and Palestinians. He participated in Breira, an organization that advocated Israeli territorial concessions in the period following the Yom Kippur War. He also served on the advisory boards of Friends of Peace Now and the New Israel Fund. His support for these organizations resulted in harsh criticism and accusations of anti-Zionism.

== Death and legacy ==
Asher died of prostate cancer on May 29, 1990.

A festschrift honoring Joseph Asher and his life's work was being edited by Moses Rischin and his son Rabbi Raphael Asher at the time of his death, and was published in 1991. The book is entitled The Jewish Legacy and the German Conscience, and includes essays by 23 scholars, including Gunther Plaut, David Ellenson, David G. Dalin, Immanuel Jakobovits, Jakob Josef Petuchowski, Paul R. Mendes-Flohr, and Gerhard Weinberg. Elie Wiesel wrote the afterword.

His successor at Congregation Emanu-El in San Francisco, Robert Kirschner, wrote that Rabbi Asher "embodied those attributes of German Jewry of which his generation was the last living witness: dignity, sobriety, erudition, and a singular elegance. Historian Fred Rosenbaum wrote that: "His deep learning, his continental manner, and above all his personal integrity afforded many congregants a sense of stability in a tumultuous world."

His son, Rabbi Raphael W. Asher, served as the rabbi at Congregation B'nai Tikvah in Walnut Creek, California until his retirement in 2014.

Congregation Emanu-El in San Francisco sponsors an annual Rabbi Asher Memorial Lecture, usually featuring a scholar who has continued Joseph Asher's life's work on Germany and the Jews.
