= Bocicoel =

Bocicoel may refer to:

- Bocicoel (formerly Hungarian: Kisbocskó), a village in Bogdan Vodă Commune, Maramureș County, Romania
- Bocicoel River, a tributary of the Vişeu River in Romania
