= Menachem Z. Rosensaft =

American lawyer (born 1948)

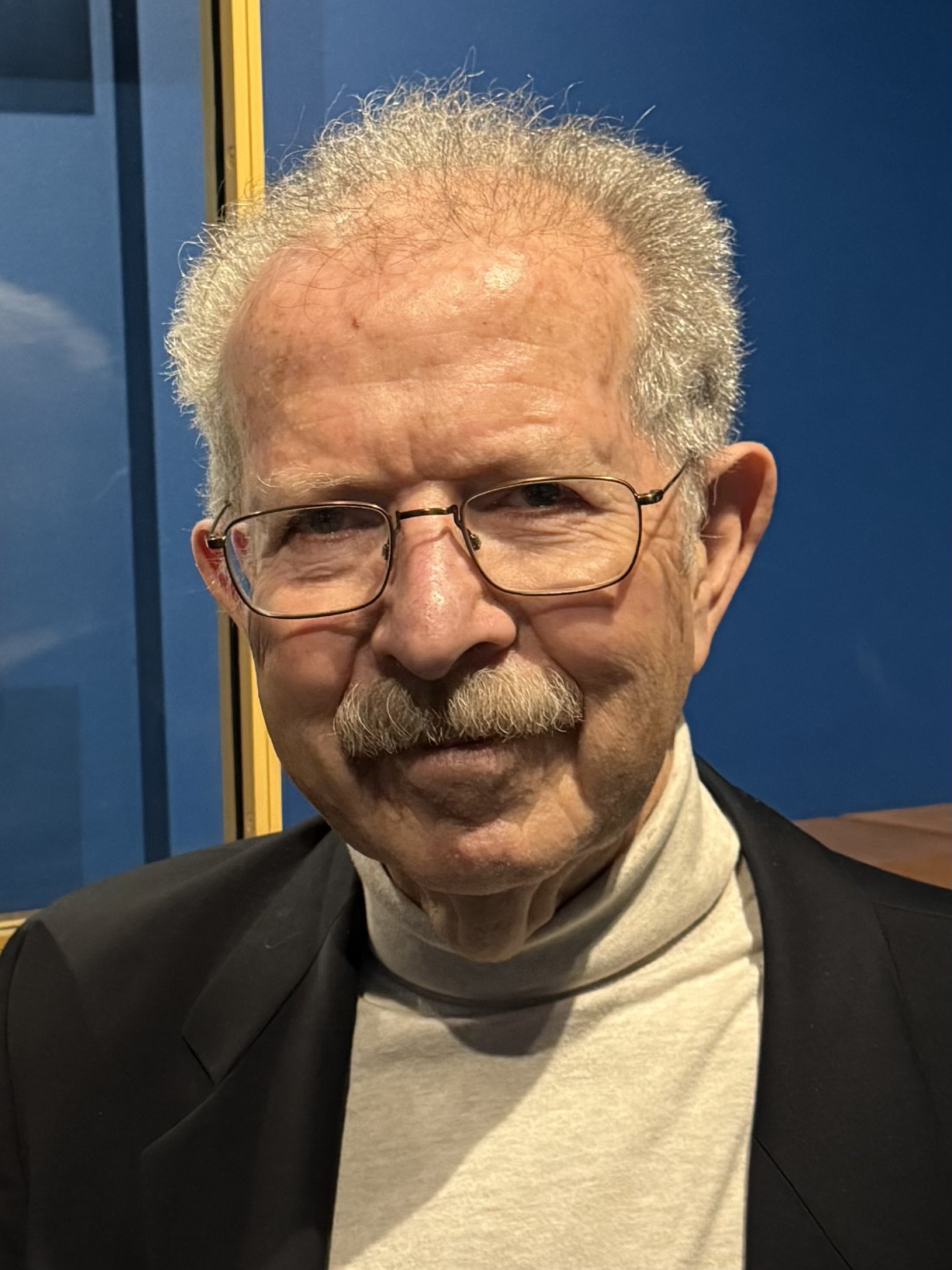
- Born: May 1, 1948 (age 78); Bergen-Belsen, Germany
- Occupation: Lawyer
- Spouse: Jean Bloch Rosensaft

Menachem Z. Rosensaft (born 1948) is an attorney in New York, a human rights activist, a professor of law and a leader of the Second Generation movement of children of Holocaust survivors. He has been described on the front page of The New York Times as one of the most prominent of the survivors' sons and daughters. He has served as national president of the Labor Zionist Alliance, and was active in the early stages of the Israeli-Palestinian peace process. As psychologist Eva Fogelman has written: "Menachem Rosensaft's moral voice has gone beyond the responsibility he felt as a child of survivors to remember and educate. He felt the need to promote peace and a tolerant State of Israel as well. He wanted to bring to justice Nazi war criminals, to fight racism and bigotry, and to work toward the continuity of the Jewish people."

Rosensaft is general counsel emeritus of the World Jewish Congress, the umbrella organization of Jewish communities around the world, based in New York. In September 2023, he stepped down as the WJC's general counsel and associate executive vice president after serving in these positions since, respectively, 2009 and 2019.

He is visiting professor of the practice at Cornell Law School, where he teaches courses on the law of genocide and on antisemitism in the courts and in jurisprudence. He is also lecturer in law at Columbia University Law School, and taught for several years as a distinguished visiting lecturer at Syracuse University College of Law. In May 2022, he was elected chairman of the advisory board of the Lower Saxony Memorials Foundation which oversees World War II memorial sites throughout the German state of Lower Saxony, including the site of the Nazi concentration camp of Bergen-Belsen.

Rosensaft's latest book, Burning Psalms: Confronting Adonai after Auschwitz, was published on January 27, 2025, following an earlier volume of his poetry, Poems Born in Bergen-Belsen (Kelsay Books, 2021). He is the editor of God, Faith & Identity from the Ashes: Reflections of Children and Grandchildren of Holocaust Survivors (Jewish Lights Publishing, 2015), The World Jewish Congress: 1936-2016 and Life Reborn: Jewish Displaced Persons 1946-1951 (United States Holocaust Memorial Museum, (2001).

== Early life ==
The son of two survivors of the Nazi concentration camps of Auschwitz and Bergen-Belsen, Menachem Rosensaft was born on May 1, 1948, in the Displaced Persons camp of Bergen-Belsen in Germany. From 1945 until 1950, his father, Josef Rosensaft, was chairman of the Jewish Committee of the Bergen-Belsen DP camp and of the Central Jewish Committee in the British Zone of Germany. His mother, Dr. Hadassah Bimko Rosensaft, was a member of President Jimmy Carter's Commission on the Holocaust, and a founding member of the United States Holocaust Memorial Council.

Menachem Rosensaft and his parents lived in Montreux, Switzerland, from 1950 until 1958, when they immigrated to the United States where he attended the Ethical Culture-Fieldston schools in New York City. In 1965, while still in high school, he edited the Bergen-Belsen Youth Magazine, a magazine consisting of essays, poems and short stories by children of Holocaust survivors who were born in the Displaced Persons camp of Bergen-Belsen.

== Academic and professional career ==
Menachem Rosensaft received his B.A. degree in 1971 from Johns Hopkins University, together with an M.A. degree in creative writing from the university's Writing Seminars. From 1972 until 1975, he was an adjunct lecturer in the Department of Jewish Studies at the City University of New York and assisted Professor Elie Wiesel in his courses on Holocaust literature and Hasidism. He received a second M.A. degree in 1975 in modern European history from Columbia University, and in 1979, he received his J.D. degree from the Columbia University School of Law, where he was a Harlan Fiske Stone Scholar and Book Review Editor of the Columbia Journal of Transnational Law.

After clerking for two years for Whitman Knapp, U.S. District Court Judge for the Southern District of New York, he spent 14 years as an international and securities litigator at several major New York law firms and at an international bank.

In 1995, he became senior international counsel for The Ronald S. Lauder Foundation, and from 1996 to 2000 was executive vice president of the Jewish Renaissance Foundation, Inc. As a foundation executive, he was responsible for the development, coordination and funding of educational and cultural projects in Eastern and Central Europe, including the acquisition and restoration of landmark buildings for use as a Jewish cultural center in Warsaw, Poland.

From September 2000 until December 2003, Rosensaft was a partner in the New York office of a national law firm, and from 2004 to 2007, he was, at first, special counsel and then general counsel of a financial services firm in New York City.

Rosensaft was appointed in 1994 to the United States Holocaust Memorial Council by President Bill Clinton, and reappointed in 1999 to a second five-year term, chairing its Content Committee from 1994 to 2000, its Collections and Acquisitions Committee from 1996 to 2000, and its Committee on Governance from 2000 to 2002. He was a member of the council's executive committee from 1996 until 2003. In September 2010, President Barack Obama appointed Rosensaft to a third term on the U.S. Holocaust Memorial Council, and reappointed him in January 2017 to a fourth term.

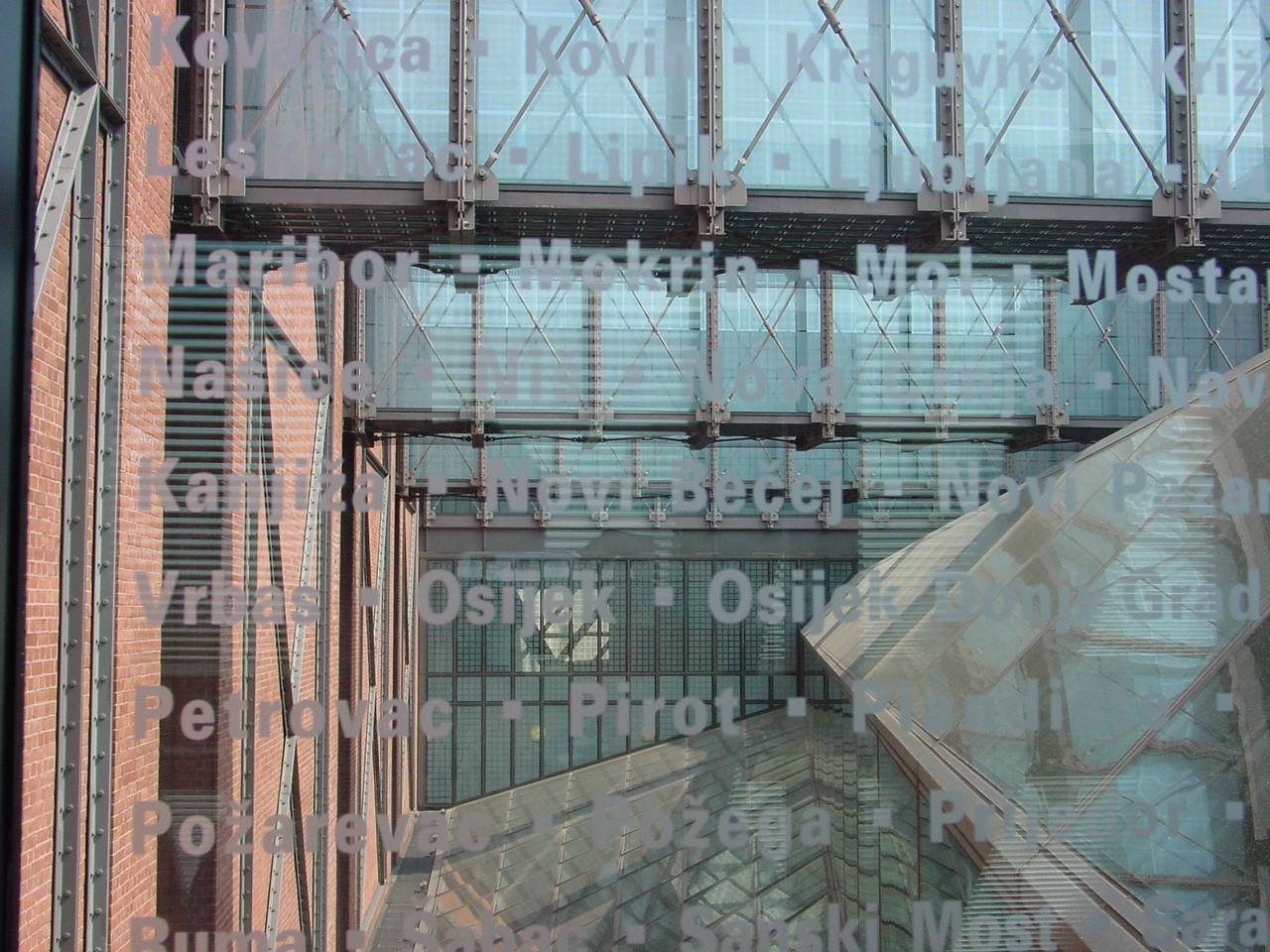
Interior of the United States Holocaust Memorial Museum, Washington, D.C.

Rosensaft is a past president of the Park Avenue Synagogue in New York City. He was chairman of the editorial board of the Holocaust Survivors' Memoirs Project, a joint publishing endeavor with Yad Vashem (the Holocaust Martyrs' and Heroes' Remembrance Authority in Israel), vice president of the American Gathering of Jewish Holocaust Survivors and their Descendants. He was one of 45 American Jews who discussed the significance of fatherhood within the context of their Jewish identity in the 2004 book, Jewish Fathers: A Legacy of Love. He received the 2003 Elie Wiesel Holocaust Remembrance Award of Israel Bonds and was awarded the 2006 Simon Rockower Award for Excellence in Feature Writing of the American Jewish Press Association for his foreword to "Great Love Stories of the Holocaust," published in the June 2005 issue of Moment. In November 2011, he received the Distinguished Humanitarian Award from the Jewish Faculty & Staff Association of New York City College of Technology. In May 2015, he was awarded the Dr. Bernard Heller Prize by the Hebrew Union College – Jewish Institute of Religion in recognition of his decades of work on behalf of the Jewish community. He has published articles in The New York Times, The Washington Post, Newsweek, Time, Tablet, Haaretz, The Times of Israel, Just Security, the Los Angeles Times, the International Herald Tribune, the New York Post, the New York Daily News, the New York Law Journal, The National Law Journal, the Jewish Telegraphic Agency (JTA), The Forward and Moment Magazine, among other publications.

Rosensaft is married to Jean Bloch Rosensaft, also the daughter of Holocaust survivors, who is senior advisor to the president and director of the Dr. Bernard Heller Museum at Hebrew Union College-Jewish Institute of Religion. He is the co-author, with their daughter, Joana D. Rosensaft, of "The Early History of German-Jewish Reparations," published in the Fordham International Law Journal.

In September 1981, he was one of the founders of the International Network of Children of Jewish Holocaust Survivors and was elected the organization's first chairman. Since June 1984, he has had the title of founding chairman. Under his leadership, the International Network organized major conferences of children of survivors in New York in 1984 and Los Angeles in 1987; in 1982, it held the first citywide rally in New York City on behalf of Ethiopian Jewry. Rosensaft also participated in the planning of and programming for the World Gathering of Jewish Holocaust Survivors in June 1981 in Jerusalem and the mass gatherings of thousands of Holocaust survivors in Washington, D.C. (1983), Philadelphia (1985) and New York (1986).

== Philosophy of Holocaust Remembrance ==
Rosensaft's philosophy of Holocaust remembrance is greatly influenced by what he has described as Elie Wiesel's "commitment to human rights, his readiness to apply the lessons of the Holocaust to contemporary issues while at all times emphasizing its Jewish particularity." Thus, his focus has been on social and political action rather than psychological introspection. In his opening address at the first international conference of children of Holocaust survivors in May 1984 in New York, he commented that human rights abuses alongside the persistence of antisemitism "serve to remind us that Jews are never the only victims of the world's evil and venality." Pointing out that "we are even confronted by the terrifying phenomenon of Jewish would-be terrorists on the West Bank who strive to implement the racist philosophy expounded by fanatics such as Meir Kahane," the American-born member of the Israeli parliament who promoted virulently anti-Arab policies, he concluded that "it is not enough for us only to commemorate the past. Rather we must be sensitive to all forms of human suffering, and we must take our place at the forefront of the struggle against racial hatred and oppression of any kind."

Twenty-one years later, on April 17, 2005, he reiterated these views in a speech at the Memorial Site of Bergen-Belsen on the 60th anniversary of its liberation. The children and grandchildren of the survivors, he declared:

were given life and placed on earth with a solemn obligation. Our parents and grandparents survived to bear witnesses. We in turn must ensure that their memories, which we have absorbed into ours, will remain as a permanent warning to humanity. Sixty years after the liberation of Belsen, anti-Semitism remains a threat, not just to the Jewish people but to civilization as a whole, and Holocaust deniers are still allowed to spread their poison. ... Sixty years after the crematoria of Auschwitz-Birkenau stopped burning our families, innocent men, women and children are murdered in a horrific genocide in Darfur. Sixty years after the surviving remnant of European Jewry emerged from the inferno of the twentieth century, government-sponsored terrorists continue to seek the destruction of the State of Israel which arose out of the ashes of the Shoah. Thus, we do not have the right to focus only on the agony and suffering of the past. While the Germans were able to torture, to murder, to destroy, they did not succeed in dehumanizing their victims. The ultimate victory of European Jews over the Nazis and their multinational accomplices was firmly rooted in their human, ethical values. The critical lesson we have learned from our parents' and grandparents' tragic experiences is that indifference to the suffering of others is in itself a crime. Our place must be at the forefront of the struggle against every form of racial, religious or ethnic hatred. Together with others of the post-Holocaust generations, we must raise our collective voices on behalf of all, Jews and non-Jews alike, who are subjected to discrimination and persecution, or who are threatened by annihilation, anywhere in the world. We may not be passive, or allow others to be passive, in the face of oppression, for we know only too well that the ultimate consequence of apathy and silence was embodied forever in the flames of Auschwitz and the mass-graves of Bergen-Belsen.

Rosensaft has struggled with the theological implications of the Holocaust. "Where was God when the fires of Auschwitz failed to ignite the universe?" he asked at a 1995 commemoration at the U.S. Holocaust Memorial Museum. As reported in The New York Times, he "posed the question of how God could be praised if he did not stop the killing. Then he suggested an answer: 'What if God was not with the killers, with the forces that inflicted Auschwitz on humanity?' " He explained, "To me, the incredible element of the Holocaust is not the behavior of the murderers, because that is pure evil. It is the behavior of the victims and how they remained human and in many ways behaved in a superhuman manner. ... So the God I choose to pray to was at Auschwitz, but it was not in the manner of the victims' deaths, it was in the way in which they lived." Following the September 11 attacks on New York City in 2001, Rosensaft elaborated on his belief that evil is perpetrated by human beings, not by God:

I believe God was at the World Trade Center and the Pentagon, just as God was present at Auschwitz and Bergen-Belsen, But God was not in the killers. God was within every Jewish parent who comforted a child on the way to the gas chambers. God's spirit was within my mother as she kept 149 Jewish children alive in Bergen-Belsen throughout the winter and early spring of 1945. The divine spark that characterizes true religious faith was within every Jew who helped a fellow inmate in the death camps, just as it was within every non-Jew who defied the Germans by risking death to save a Jew. Similarly, God was in all the New York City firefighters, police officers and rescue workers who risked or gave their own lives to save others. God was in the heroic passengers of United Flight 93 who overpowered the terrorists and sacrificed themselves rather than allow the hijackers to reach their target. God was in the man who remained in the World Trade Center with a friend confined to a wheelchair. God was in every victim who made one last telephone call to say 'I love you,' or whose final thoughts were of a husband, a wife, children, a parent or a friend.

Rosensaft elaborated on this theme in a guest sermon at Park Avenue Synagogue in New York City on September 7, 2013, the Saturday between Rosh Hashanah (Jewish New Year) and Yom Kippur (Day of Atonement), in which he concluded that as he remembered his parents on the anniversary of their death, "perhaps God did not hide His face from them after all during the years of the Shoah. Perhaps it was a divine spirit within them that enabled them to survive with their humanity intact. And perhaps it is to that God that we should be addressing our prayers during these Days of Awe and throughout the year."

In response to this sermon, Pope Francis wrote to Rosensaft in a personal email message that:

When you, with humility, are telling us where God was in that moment, I felt within me that you had transcended all possible explanations and that, after a long pilgrimage — sometimes sad, tedious or dull – you came to discover a certain logic and it is from there that you were speaking to us; the logic of First Kings 19:12, the logic of that "gentle breeze" (I know that it is a very poor translation of the rich Hebrew expression) that constitutes the only possible hermeneutic interpretation. Thank you from my heart. And, please, do not forget to pray for me. May the Lord bless you.

== Holocaust Remembrance-related activities ==
In the spring of 1985, Rosensaft was a vocal critic of President Ronald Reagan's decision to pay homage to fallen German World War II soldiers, including members of Hitler's Waffen-SS, at the military cemetery at Bitburg during a state visit to Germany. Addressing some 5,000 Holocaust survivors and their families on April 21, 1985, in Philadelphia, Rosensaft said, "For heaven's sake, let him find another cemetery. There must be at least one in all of Germany that does not contain SS men." On May 5, 1985, Rosensaft organized and led a demonstration of survivors and children of survivors at Bergen-Belsen in protest against the visits that day by President Reagan and West German Chancellor Helmut Kohl to the mass-graves of Bergen-Belsen and Bitburg. Nobel Peace Prize laureate Elie Wiesel wrote in his memoirs that Rosensaft was "one of the very few to strongly oppose President Reagan in the Bitburg affair."

Rosensaft was instrumental in April 1987 in convincing the government of Panama not to give sanctuary to Nazi war criminal Karl Linnas, and in ensuring Linnas' deportation from the United States to the Soviet Union. He also "publicly criticized the German government for failing to provide Holocaust survivors with adequate medical coverage while paying generous pensions to veterans of the Waffen SS," and he has challenged the multimillion-dollar fee application submitted by the court-appointed lead settlement counsel in a Holocaust-based class action brought against Swiss banks in the name of survivors.

In the winter of 2002, Rosensaft sharply attacked the Jewish Museum in New York for trivializing the Holocaust in its exhibition, "Mirroring Evil: Nazi Imagery/Recent Art," by including a display of six lifelike busts of the Auschwitz SS doctor Josef Mengele and such works as "Prada Deathcamp" and the "Giftgas Giftset" of poison gas canisters packaged with Chanel, Hermes and Tiffany & Co. logos. "For a Holocaust survivor to hear that a bust of Mengele is on display at the Jewish Museum will at the least cause nightmares," Rosensaft told Alan Cooperman of The Washington Post. "It's the functional equivalent of painting pornography on Torah scrolls and exhibiting it as art. It may well be art. But it is also offensive to many, many people. ... The intellectual reasons of displaying deliberately provocative art have to give way to the far more real pain that this is going to cause for thousands of Holocaust survivors who are still alive."

In March 2010, Rosensaft sparked a formal investigation by the Maryland attorney general into the activities of Menachem Youlus, a rabbi and scribe based in a Washington, D.C., suburb, for falsely claiming to have "rescued" Torah scrolls that had survived the Holocaust, and fraudulently selling then to synagogues and Jewish centers. Two years later, after Youlus pleaded guilty to mail fraud and wire fraud in federal court, Rosensaft told The New York Times, "I am gratified that this charlatan will now be fully exposed, as a matter of law, as a petty crook."

== Burning Psalms: Confronting Adonai after Auschwitz ==
Rosensaft's book Burning Psalms: Confronting Adonai after Auschwitz was published by Ben Yehuda Press on January 27, 2025, to coincide with International Holocaust Remembrance Day and the 80th anniversary of the liberation of the Auschwitz-Birkenau death camp.

Through his poetry, which Holocaust scholar Michael Berenbaum praised as "sacred heresy", Rosensaft evokes the voice of his older brother, Benjamin, his mother's son, who perished in a gas chamber at the age of five-and-a-half. Rosensaft never met his sibling.

Kirkus Reviews described Burning Psalms as a "haunting reimaging of the Book of Psalms," stating, "In these pages, responding to all 150 Psalms individually, the author balances his mastery of Jewish theology with a raw writing style that is unafraid to question, lash out at and lament God's seeming passivity in the face of evil."

Gary Rosenblatt, former editor and publisher of the New York Jewish Week, wrote, "Rosensaft's psalms read like one long cry of anger, frustration and abandonment. The images and emotions are raw and vivid – gas chambers, screams, torn rags, stale bread, lice-infested straw. He questions why God was silent but he doesn't expect any answers – and doesn't get any. At the heart of every psalm is the endless challenge: where were You? ... Read individually, each psalm is a wrenching, powerful and blunt punch to the gut. As one reads on, and the accusations of divine abandonment mount in the midst of a relentless recitation of suffering, one wants to say "enough". Perhaps that was an intention of the author, to drive the reader to despair. ... "

Professor Susannah Heschel, Eli M. Black Professor of Jewish Studies at Dartmouth College, wrote, "Like the Book of Psalms of the Bible, Menachem Rosensaft's psalms speak for our souls. With a gift for expressing even the most hidden thoughts and feelings, his psalms give voice to the horrors and trauma that haunt children of Holocaust victims and survivors. Burning Psalms is one of the most powerful Jewish expressions of our day."

Rabbi Jeffrey Salkin of Religion News Service, called Burning Psalms a "spectacular new book" and wrote, "Menachem knows what he is doing, and he knows what he has inherited. The traditional liturgy contains a litany: 'May the One Who answered ... answer us as well.' It refers to biblical moments when God was present. Not here and not now. Menachem is adamant: God was silent during the Holocaust and Jews cannot echo that divine silence in the presence of contemporary evil."

In addition, in a coda, Rosensaft's latest book reaches beyond the Holocaust to commemorate the 1995 genocide of Bosnian Muslims at Srebrenica, the Hamas terrorist group's slaughter of innocents in Israel on Oct. 7, 2023, and the subsequent tragic suffering of both Israeli and Palestinian children in the Israel-Hamas war in Gaza.

== Poems Born in Bergen-Belsen ==
Menachem Rosensaft's earlier book, Poems Born in Bergen-Belsen, published in April 2021 by Kelsay Books, also received critical acclaim. Kirkus Reviews called the book "a haunting and unrelenting volume of Holocaust-centered works," with the reviewer writing that "Rosensaft's poems are sparse and measured, filled with images of ghosts, fires, ash and darkness; they're rarely portraits of quiet grief. More often, he animates the words with simmering anger as they voice frustration toward perpetrators, bystanders and even God." Micah Zevin wrote in Booklist that Rosensaft's "memoiristic poems infiltrate the readers' minds with evocative, lyrical lines flowing one into another like the chanting of bible passages or a lament," forcing readers "to travel to a past they've never experienced, and to become immersed, alongside the author, in faith, doubt and pain while offering tribute to the fallen."

Holocaust scholar Michael Berenbaum wrote in the Jerusalem Post:

There is anger in Rosensaft's poetry, an anger most reminiscent of the early writing of survivors. ... But what is wonderful in Rosensaft's writing is that he fights intensely for Jewish rights -- but not exclusively. He defends the uniqueness of the Holocaust, not to place it on the mountain top as the Olympus of suffering and evil, but to use it as a spiritual push to be sensitive to all suffering and all evil. The concluding poem of the book was written after the past summer and speaks to the extinguished life of George Floyd. ... In this slim but moving volume, we can witness an encounter with barbarity and its memory that does not descend but ascends. It uses language to enrich, enhance and inspire.

Reviewing the book in the National Catholic Register, Peter Jesserer Smith wrote:

With a passion reminiscent of Dylan Thomas's poetry, Rosensaft confronts God with the full force of human emotion — in sadness, anger, fury, defiance and desolation, Rosensaft evokes in this poetry the tradition of the Psalms' raw and emotional conversation with God, while inverting the common expectation of certain Psalms people read for comfort. ... Poems Born in Bergen-Belsen gives us the 'gift of tears' to see the answer to the question 'Where is God?' in the midst of suffering is found in us. Like the poet, we can see God dancing, mourning and never desiring illness or death, but we are the ones that God counts on to be part of his answer about where his presence is to be found in the world, whether it is the homeless child or the human family struck by another genocide. Only by remonstrating with God, and putting upon God the responsibility to justify his silence or permissiveness in the face of tremendous evil, do we open ourselves to be the answer God would speak to the world.

In a September 2021 interview with Al Jazeera, Menachem Rosensaft explained why he writes poetry:

Over the decades I have tried to give voice to the dead in my poems, to comfort ghosts, and to provide a memorial to the millions who have none. For me, conceptualizing my poems is often simultaneously a refuge and an escape. An escape from the realm of conventional human experience into a parallel of internal reality. And a refuge where amorphous, phantasmagoric thoughts and images emerge sufficiently from their nebulous twilight to allow me to express them, however inadequately, in words.

== Israel / Palestinian peace process ==
Rosensaft, who was known to support the Israeli peace movement, was elected national president of the Labor Zionist Alliance in early 1988. Shortly thereafter, he confronted Israeli Prime Minister Yitzhak Shamir at a meeting of the Conference of Presidents of Major Jewish Organizations. Shamir had called on the American Jewish leadership to support his government's hardline policies and criticized those who publicly espoused more dovish positions. Rosensaft responded by noting that since Israelis themselves were divided, "Why should we be accused of disloyalty?" "We support Israel fully and identify with her totally," he explained, referring to the more liberal Jewish groups that belonged to the Presidents Conference. "But that does not mean we have to agree with every single decision or policy set by the government or a particular minister. Voicing our concerns does not indicate disloyalty."

In December 1988, he was one of five American Jews in Stockholm, Sweden, who met with Yasir Arafat and other senior leaders of the Palestine Liberation Organization, resulting in the PLO's first public recognition of Israel. Writing in Newsweek, he explained that despite an initial reluctance to participate in such a meeting, he concluded that since he had urged others to negotiate with the PLO, "I really had no choice. Since I wanted others to talk to the enemy, I had to be willing to do so as well – not going would be a betrayal of my principles both as a Jew and as a Zionist." For Rosensaft, the very beginning of dialogue was a major accomplishment. "There are miles to go," he said. "But for God's sake, let's start talking. When you talk, you de-demonize the enemy."

A year later, in an open letter to Arafat also published in Newsweek, he voiced his dismay at the fact that the Palestinian leader had done nothing to move the peace process forward since the Stockholm meeting.

In October 2000, Rosensaft expressed his disillusionment with Arafat. "We believed him," Rosensaft wrote in The Washington Post, "when he said that he and the PLO were committed to a political solution to the Israeli-Palestinian conflict. We believed him when he proclaimed an end to terrorism. We were wrong. ... Of course the Palestinians were entitled to self-determination – even independence—but only on terms of mutual respect. The Palestinians' claims of nationhood could not stand separate and apart from their acknowledgment that Israelis are entitled to precisely the same rights. Arafat and his colleagues gave lip service to these lofty sentiments. We believed them. We were wrong. ... Perhaps, in time, the Palestinians will realize that a different leader will better serve them and their cause. ... Perhaps they will realize that stabbing and stomping Israeli soldiers to death and then parading their mutilated bodies in an obscene triumph is not acceptable behavior in the 21st century. Perhaps. But then, we also believe in the eventual arrival of the Messiah. In the meantime, those of us who wanted so desperately to see Arafat as a positive, constructive presence of any kind must reiterate over and over again: We were wrong."

== Srebrenica genocide ==
In both 2022 and 2023, Rosensaft delivered the keynote addresses at the annual commemoration for the victims of the Srebrenica genocide at the Srebrenica Memorial Center in Potocari, Bosnia and Herzegovina, and he advocated for formal international recognition by the United Nations of the Srebrenica genocide.

As early as 2015, Rosensaft publicly confronted Efraim Zuroff, the Simon Wiesenthal Center's director for Eastern European Affairs, for denying that the Srebrenica massacre was genocide, arguing that:

I cannot in good conscience condemn the perpetrators of the genocide in which my brother and my grandparents perished unless I also condemn the perpetrators of all other acts of genocide, including the genocide that took place at Srebrenica. I cannot in good conscience mourn my brother as a victim of genocide unless I similarly mourn all other victims of genocide, including the victims at Srebrenica.

He also responded to and criticized denialist arguments in a comprehensive legal analysis titled "Ratko Mladić's Genocide Conviction, and Why it Matters," published in Tablet magazine on the day the Bosnian Serb general was found guilty of "genocide, extermination, murder, and other crimes against humanity and war crimes" by the International Criminal Tribunal for the Former Yugoslavia. In that article, Rosensaft agreed with the ICTY Trial Chamber's conclusion that "the Srebrenica massacre was indeed a genocide because it was an essential element of the intent to destroy the Muslim population of Eastern Bosnia as a whole."

In July 2021, Rosensaft wrote a detailed critique of the report issued by the purportedly "independent" Republika Srpska-appointed commission headed by the Israeli academic Gideon Greif that concluded that the slaughter of Bosnian Muslims at Srebrenica did not constitute a genocide. "As the son of two survivors of Auschwitz and Bergen-Belsen who were deeply committed to transmitting to future generations evidence of the crimes perpetrated against European Jewry during the Holocaust," Rosensaft wrote,

I am especially appalled by the report's shameless manipulation of the truth. It is a document that deserves to be consigned to the dustbin of history, used only to demonstrate the moral failing of individuals — the proverbial "useful idiots", as it were — who engage in genocide denial and distortion. The report is an embarrassment to scholarship and flies in the face of the established record in international law.

Greif's report, Rosensaft wrote in Haaretz, "repeatedly casts the Bosniaks as aggressors and the Bosnian Serbs as victims, in a rewriting of history reminiscent of Third Reich Propaganda Minister Joseph Goebbels' justifications for Nazi German antisemitism."

In December 2021, Rosensaft commended the German government for rescinding its decision to honor Greif for his earlier Holocaust-related work. "Gideon Greif has emerged as the poster child for Srebrenica genocide deniers," he told Haaretz, "and honoring him, even with respect to his prior academic work . . . would have been tantamount to endorsing his wholly specious and both morally and jurisprudentially offensive distortion of the facts regarding the slaughter of Bosniak Muslims."

Rosensaft also sharply criticized Greif for saying in an interview that the German government's decision not to give him this award was "a black stain on Germany. They are murdering the Holocaust victims for a second time." Rosensaft wrote in Haaretz: "It takes an acute disconnect from reality to compare genocide with the cancellation of an award. To assert such a grotesque and wholly unconscionable equivalence would suggest a delusional mindset, one that perversely places a perceived slight to one's outsized, but evidently hyper-fragile, ego in the same category and on the same level as mass murder."

In July 2023, Rosensaft was awarded an honorary doctorate by the University of Tuzla in Bosnia and Herzegovina in recognition of his "contribution to raising awareness of the genocide against Bosnians in Srebrenica and the Holocaust, through the fight against the denial of crimes and the falsification of historical facts, and for contributing to peace building and the development of a culture of remembrance."

In January 2024, Rosensaft joined with Husein ef. Kavazović, the Grand Mufti of Bosnia's Islamic Community, at Srebrenica in launching the Muslim-Jewish Peace and Remembrance Initiative "to forge a path of reconciliation, mutual respect, and active peacebuilding".

"We must do all in our collective power to change the future, to prevent further destruction and violence, and to reject all manifestations of antisemitism, of Islamophobia, of bigotry, of xenophobia and of hatred," Rosensaft said on that occasion, "and we must do so together".
