= Yisroel Aryeh Zalmanowitz =

Romanian rabbi (1916-2003)

Rabbi Yisroel Aryeh Zalmanowitz ישראל אריה זלמנוביץ
- Zalmanowitz in Bergen-Belsen
- Title: Chief Rabbi of Acre

Personal life
- Born: December 29, 1916 Kechnia, Austria-Hungary
- Died: June 23, 2003 (aged 86) Israel
- Buried: Petah Tikva, Israel

Religious life
- Religion: Judaism
- Denomination: Orthodox
- Other: Rosh Yeshiva of Bursha, rabbi of Bergen-Belsen, rabbi of Kiryat Sanz

Yisroel Aryeh Zalmanowitz (Hebrew: ישראל אריה זלמנוביץ; December 29, 1916–June 23, 2003) was an Ashkenazi rosh yeshiva in Bursha before the Holocaust. After the Holocaust he was one of the Rabbis of Bergen-Belsen. Later in Israel, he was Chief Rabbi of Acre and the Rabbi of Kiryat Sanz.

== Biography ==
Zalmanowitz was born on December 29, 1916, in Kechnia, Austria-Hungary (now Bogdan Vodă, Romania). His father was Rabbi Shemuel Nuta.

In his youth, Zalmanowitz studied in several yeshivas in Transylvania, including Vișeu de Sus and Cluj, where he became one of the most prominent disciples of Rabbi Yekusiel Yehudah Halberstam.

== Rosh Yeshiva of Bursha ==
Rabbi Zalmanowitz married in 1941 as was appointed one of the Roshei Yeshiva in Borșa (Bursha).

== Rabbi of Bergen-Belsen and Member of the Vaad Harabonim of The British Zone ==
Rabbi Zalmanowitz survived the Holocaust and was liberated in Bergen-Belsen on April 15, 1945. He was appointed to be one of member rabbis of the bais din in Bergen-Belsen and together with the other rabbis was instrumental in permitting numerous agunot to remarry.

Rabbi Zalmanowitz was also appointed to be one of the member Rabbis of the Vaad Harabonim of The British Zone, which was established and led by Rabbi Yoel Halpern.

== Rabbi of Kiryat Sanz and Chief Rabbi of Acre ==
Rabbi Zalmanowitz emigrated to Israel and in the early 1960s became the Chief Rabbi of Acre. Additionally, he was appointed Rabbi of Kiryat Sanz.

== Death ==
Rabbi Zalmanowitz died on June 23, 2003, and was buried in Petah Tikva.

== Family ==
Rabbi Zalmanowitz's first wife and their daughter were murdered in Auschwitz in 1944. After the Holocaust, Rabbi Zalmanowitz remarried and had three sons and three daughters. One of his sons-in-law is Rabbi Asher Weiss.
