= Błaszki =

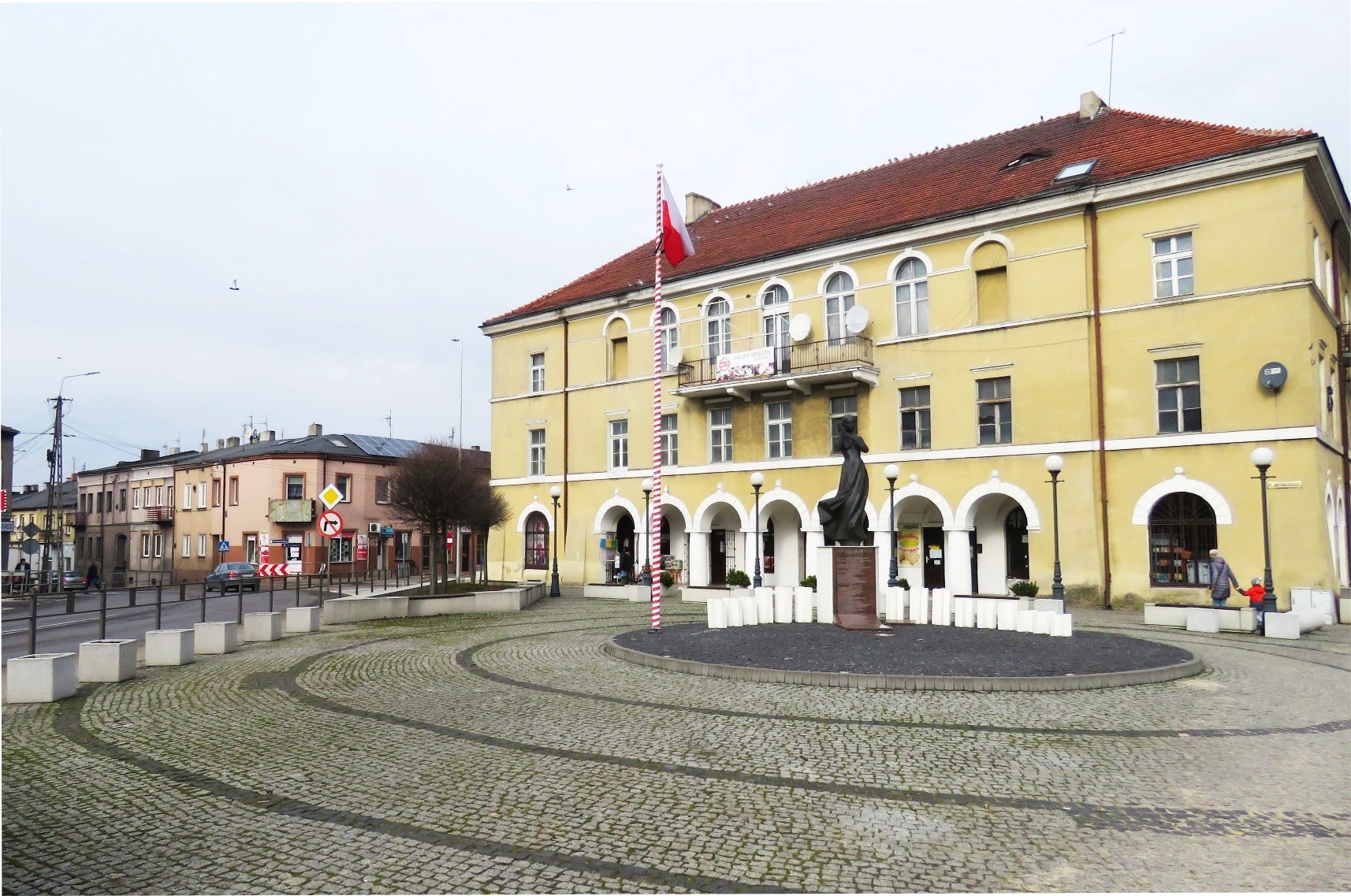
- Plac Niepodległości (Independence Square)

- Flag Coat of arms

- Location within Poland
- Coordinates: 51°39′N 18°26′E
- Country: Poland
- Voivodeship: Łódź
- County: Sieradz
- Gmina: Błaszki

Government
  - Mayor: Piotr Świderski

Area
  - Total: 1.62 km^{2} (0.63 sq mi)

Population (31 December 2021)
  - Total: 1,992
  - Density: 1,230/km^{2} (3,200/sq mi)
- Time zone: UTC+1 (CET)
  - Summer (DST): UTC+2 (CEST)
- Postal code: 98-235
- Area code: +48 43
- Car plates: ESI
- Website: http://www.blaszki.pl/

Błaszki ([ˈbwaʂkʲi]) is a town in Sieradz County, Łódź Voivodeship, in central Poland, with 1,992 inhabitants as of December 2021.

== History ==
Błaszki was founded in the 14th century. The first recorded mention of Błaszki dates from 1386 concerning the parish priest of Blascowicz and verifies that a Catholic parish was there. The oldest document that describes the town dates from 1437 which concerns granting benefice towards Błaszki by Wincenty Kot who was the Archbishop of Gniezno to parish priest Potworowski. Błaszki was administratively located in the Sieradz County in the Sieradz Voivodeship in the Greater Poland Province of the Kingdom of Poland. In 1652, King John II Casimir Vasa established weekly Sunday markets.

In 1926, town limits were greatly expanded by including the settlements of Janówka and Lubanów and a part of Borysławice as new neighbourhoods.

=== Jewish community ===
The first historical mention of Jewish residents dates back to 1717. In the 1860s, Jewish residents accounted for 60% of the total population. Until the 1920s, an estimated 400 Jewish families and 215 Christian families resided in Blaszki. The Jewish community was frequently targeted by anti-Semitic attacks. Additionally, they were the victims of organized anti-Jewish boycotts which arranged to open a Christian shop next door or directly across from every Jewish shop. The Holocaust brought an end to this community. In September 1939, immediately after the German invasion of Poland, the Nazis arrested ten of the most important members of the community and executed them On December 20, 1939, the Błaszki Jews were transported to Łosice, Sarnaki and Sokołowo.

In 1932 a local Zionist activist and writer Herman Solnik, published Fun alṭn ḳloysṭer (From The Old Monastery, in Yiddish), a book of tales and legends about Błaszki and the then Kalisz County.

== Transport ==
Blaszki lies along national road 12 which connects it to Kalisz to the west and to Sieradz to the east.

Voivodeship roads 710 and 449 meet in the town.

Blaszki has a station on the Leszno-Łódź railway line.

== Notable people ==
- Isaac Meir Kanal (Rabbi of Blaszki 1907-1922)
- Chaim Pinchas Lubinsky
- Phillip Blashki
