= Chaim Pinchas Lubinsky =

Mashgiach of the yeshiva in Bergen Belsen

Rabbi Chaim Pinchas Lubinsky
- חיים פנחס לובינסקי

Chief Rabbi of Hannover Germany
- In office 1946–1949
- Preceded by: Rabbi Samuel Freund
- Succeeded by: Rabbi Shlomo Zev Zweigenhaft

Personal details
- Born: August 1, 1915 Blaszki Poland
- Died: November 28, 1985 (aged 70) New York City

Rabbi Chaim Pinchas Lubinsky (Hebrew: חיים פנחס לובינסקי; August 1, 1915 – November 28, 1985) was the mashgiach of the yeshiva in Bergen Belsen and the Chief Rabbi of Hanover from 1946 to 1949.

== Early life and ancestry ==
Rabbi Chaim Pinchas Lubinsky was born in Blaszki, Poland on August 1, 1915. His father Rabbi Chiel Meyer Lubinsky was a Rosh Yeshiva in Łódź. His grandfather Rabbi Bunem Menashe Lubinsky had served as the Rabbi of Gąbin.

== Mashgiach of the yeshiva in Bergen-Belsen ==
Rabbi Lubinsky survived the Holocaust and was liberated in Bergen Belsen on April 11, 1945. Later that year, Rabbi Gershon Liebman founded a Yeshiva in Bergen-Belsen named "She’eris Yisroel" (the remnants of Israel) and Rabbi Lubinsky was appointed to be the mashgiach of the Yeshiva.

== Chief Rabbi of Hannover ==
In January 1946, the British Chief Rabbi's Religious Council appointed Rabbi Lubinsky to be the Chief Rabbi of Hanover which was located in the British Zone of Germany. Rabbi Lubinsky was assisted in the Rabbinate by Rabbi Shlomo Zev Zweigenhaft. On several occasions, Rabbi Lubinsky was instrumental in permitting agunot to remarry. Rabbi Lubinsky was also appointed to be one of the member Rabbis of the Vaad Harabonim of The British Zone, which was established and led by Rabbi Yoel Halpern.

== In the United States ==
In 1949, the British occupation of North-West Germany ended and the British Chief Rabbi's Religious Emergency Council and its appointees were required to wrap up their operations in Germany. Rabbi Lubinsky then emigrated to the United States.

In 1952, Rabbi Lubinsky was appointed by Rabbi Eliezer Silver to serve as the principal of the "Chofetz Chaim" Jewish day school in Cincinnati, Ohio.

In 1953, Rabbi Lubinsky moved to Brooklyn New York, where he would spend the rest of his life. He was a speaker at several functions hosted by the Agudath Israel of America.

== Death ==
Lubinsky died in New York City on November 28, 1985, and was buried the next day on the Mount of Olives in Jerusalem.

== Family ==
Rabbi Lubinsky was married to Rebbetzin Privah, the daughter of Rabbi Reuven Sender. Privah was murdered during the Holocaust in the Stutthof concentration camp. After surviving the Holocaust, Rabbi Lubinsky married his cousin Rebbetzin Pessah, the daughter of his uncle Menachem Lubinsky, together they had two sons.

Rabbi Lubinsky's sister, Rebbetzin Frieda, was married to Rabbi Shlomo Zev Zweigenhaft.
