= Melbourne Magistrates' Court =

Court building in Melbourne, Australia

Coordinates: 37.813365°S 144.956403°E

The Melbourne Magistrates' Court is the largest venue at which the Magistrates' Court of Victoria sits. It is a court in Melbourne, Victoria, Australia that deals with, and dispenses of, a range of criminal and civil matters, including criminal prosecutions, money claims and disputes up to $100,000, and family violence and family law proceedings.

== Current Location – William and Lonsdale Street Building ==
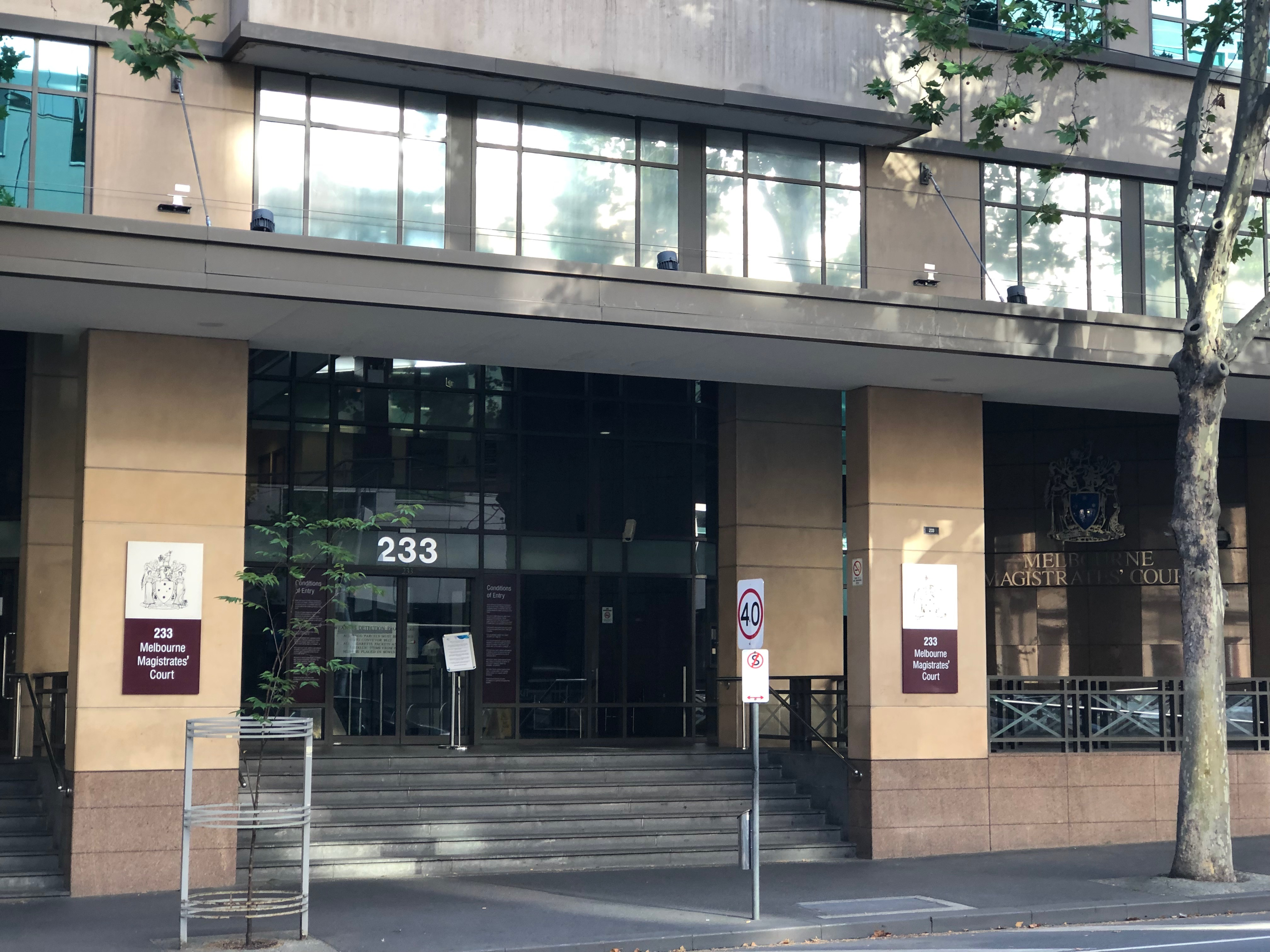
The current location of the Melbourne Magistrates' Court on William Street

In 1995, the Melbourne Magistrates Court was relocated to 233 William Street, Melbourne which it remains to date. The building is divided into eight floors, the first six of which are accessible to the public. Court hours are 9:00am through 4:30pm, with a one hour lunch break between 1:00pm to 2:00pm. The court is also open on weekends and after hours for limited urgent police matters.

=== Floors ===
Ground Floor – Upon passing through security, the ground floor hosts 2 of the largest courtrooms in the building, often used to hear matters featuring accused persons in custody. The ground floor also features a General Enquiries counter.

- First Floor – Intervention order counter and waiting room.
- Second Floor – Multiple registries and counters for different court matters, including civil and criminal registry, and committal and diversion coordinator.
- Third Floor – Courts 3 to 10 inclusive; hundreds of criminal cases heard daily.
- Fourth Floor – Various specialist courtrooms and Court Integrated Services Programme registry.
- Fifth Floor – Multiple courtrooms generally reserved for civil matters and miscellaneous prosecutions.
- Sixth Floor – Variety of courtrooms, including Courtroom 27 which is host to intervention order applications Monday through Friday.

=== Melbourne Custody Centre ===
A battery of police cells are situated on floors beneath the court building. Limited public access is allowed only by appointment. Legal practitioners are permitted to speak with persons being held in custody.

=== Travel Directions ===
- Tram – Tram stop outside front of building on Williams Street, route 58 Toorak to West Coburg.
- Train – Short walk from Flagstaff Station.
- Bus – Bus stop on corner of William and Lonsdale Street.
- Parking – Metered street parking and various multi-level carparks nearby. No visitor parking on premises.

=== Visitor Recommendations ===
Visitors and parties are advised to arrive well in advance of their scheduled court time, to allow for delays proceeding through security and to account for elevator wait-time. Visitors are expected to surrender all loose items and bags to an x-ray scan, and pass their bodies through a metal detector upon entry. Bathrooms are located on all floors – caution recommended for those located on the busier floors (i.e. 1 and 3). The Court often takes a lunch break between 1:00pm to 2:00pm. Wait-times are a regular criticism, as a case may be called at any time between 9:00am to 4:30pm, reading materials are recommended. The court features 4 busy elevators commonly ferrying visitors among the multiple floors, along with a stairwell. Smoking is not permitted in the stairwell, or anywhere else inside or within 5 metres of the building – ash-trays are located on public bins along William Street. Public water fountains and vending machines situated on each floor.

== History – Former buildings ==
Although the current court was established by the Magistrates' Court Act 1989 (Victoria), Victoria has had magistrates since 1836, when the people of Melbourne elected an arbitrator of the city to resolve minor disputes. Captain William Lonsdale, a police magistrate, was appointed in 1836 and the first case was heard at a location near the present site of Southern Cross station.

In 1838, a third court, the Court of Petty Sessions was created. By 1890, all three types of courts were held at 235 locations throughout Victoria.

On 20 January 1914, the new City Court was opened at Russell Street in Melbourne and Phillip Blashki JP was the first Chairman of the City Court Bench. The then Prime Minister, Alfred Deakin, presented Blashki with an illuminated address signed by 30 of the court's solicitors when he retired, aged 70.

=== La Trobe and Russell Street buildings ===
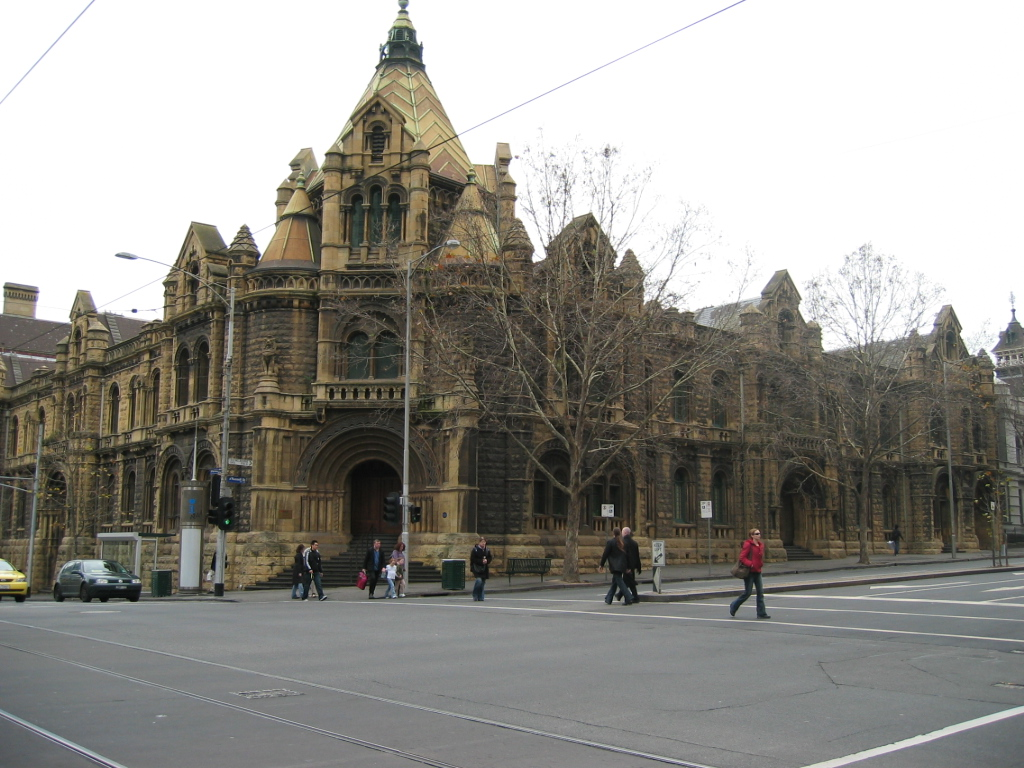
Former Melbourne Magistrates' Court on the corner of La Trobe Street and Russell Street

On January 20, 1914, three courts were opened on the corners of LaTrobe and Russell streets: the City Court, the District Court, and a third Emergency Court. A feature of the District Court is a wooden canopy over the seat upon which the Magistrate sits. This canopy was taken from old Supreme Court which had originally been located at the site.

The Court relocated to its current address on William Street in 1995. Since then, the Old Magistrates' Court Building has been annexed as part of RMIT University, as Building 20, and is used for lectures.

== See also ==
- Magistrates' Court of Victoria
