= Fred Rosenbaum =

American historian

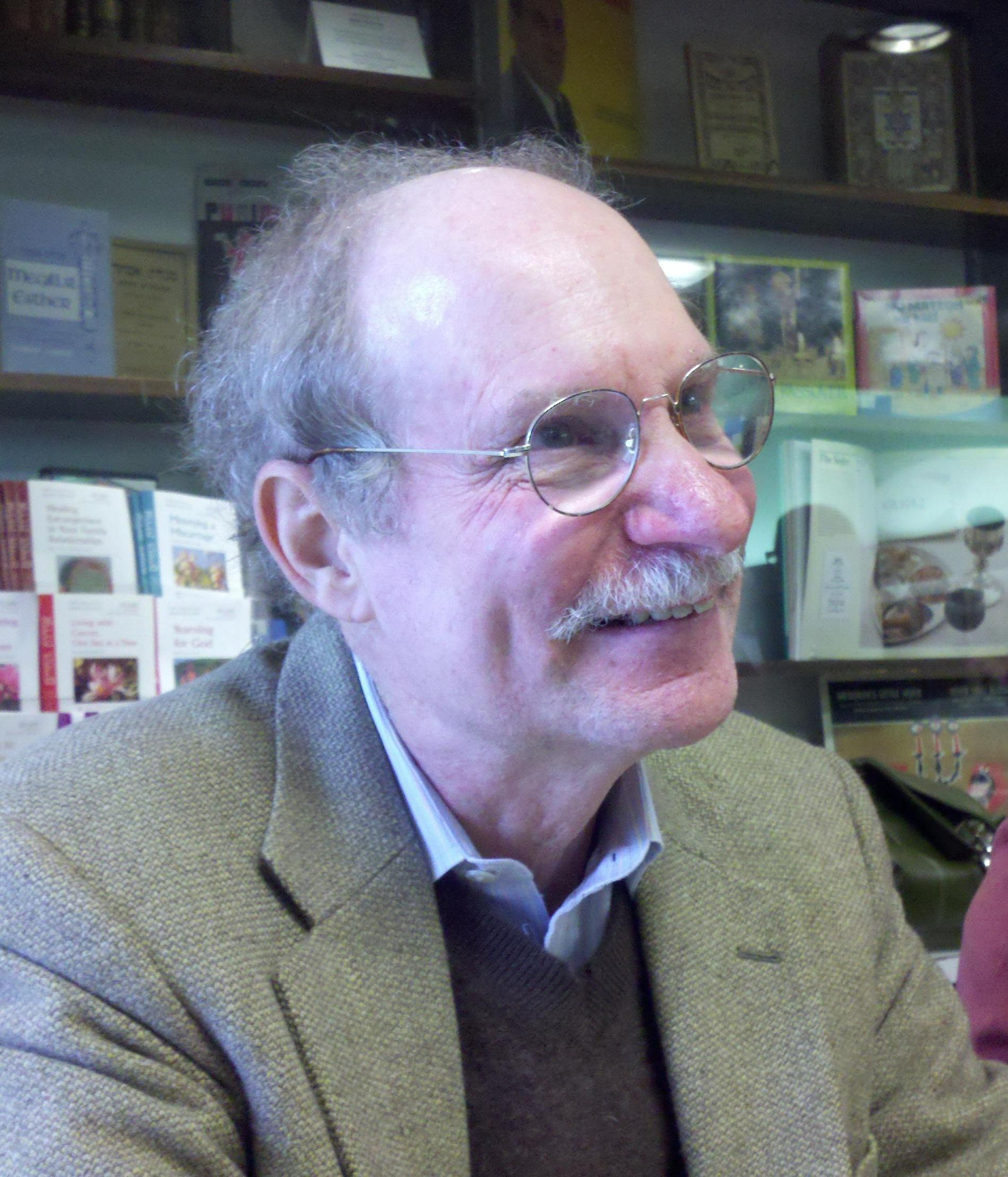
Fred Rosenbaum at a lecture in Napa, California in 2011

Fred Rosenbaum is an American author, historian and adult educator, specializing in the history of the Jewish community of the San Francisco Bay Area. Rosenbaum has been called a "superb storyteller". He is a founder and the director of Lehrhaus Judaica in Berkeley, California, described as "the largest Jewish adult education center in the western United States".

== Early life and education ==
Rosenbaum grew up in Queens, New York, in a family that was "marked by the Holocaust". His mother fled Poland and escaped to the United States. His father had earlier emigrated from Poland and became a sergeant in the United States Army, fighting in Europe during World War II.

Rosenbaum earned a bachelor's degree at Washington University in St. Louis in 1968, and then studied the history of Nazi Germany as a Fulbright fellow in West Germany. He earned a master's degree in European history at the University of California, Berkeley.

== Lehrhaus Judaica ==
Inspired by the life of Franz Rosenzweig, he left traditional academia in 1974 to cofound Lehrhaus Judaica, which was named after Rosenzweig's Freies Juedisches Lehrhaus, which was founded in 1920, and closed by the Nazis 18 years later. Lehrhaus Judaica has been described as "a continuing-education program affiliated with Berkeley Hillel" Rosenbaum was then a graduate student at the University of California Berkeley, and cofounded Lehrhaus Judaica with Seymour Fromer of the Judah L. Magnes Museum and Rabbi Steven Robbins of Berkeley Hillel. Described as a "new program of Jewish adult education" in 1988, in 1998, it was called "The grandparent of community adult learning institutions".

== Observations on Northern California Jewish history ==
Rosenbaum has expressed the opinion that anti-semitism was less of a factor affecting the Jews of Northern California than in most other areas of the world. "Perhaps most remarkable was the uncommon degree of acceptance, indeed respect, accorded San Francisco Jewry by the larger society". Another group, the Asians (the Chinese in the 19th century, and the Japanese-Americans during World War II) bore the brunt of social ostracism in the region. He noted that "it was the Asians who were abused during these years of turmoil; they and not the Jews became the scapegoats".

Rosenbaum's most recent book, Cosmopolitans: A Social and Cultural History of the Jews of the San Francisco Bay Area, a comprehensive history of the first 100 years of the Jewish community of the San Francisco Bay Area, has been widely reviewed. According to the San Francisco Chronicle, Rosenbaum "researched his subject over several decades." The reviewer of the book observed that "his dedication to the topic is evident in its encyclopedic scope".

== Publications ==
- Fred Rosenbaum (2009). Cosmopolitans: A Social and Cultural History of the Jews of the San Francisco Bay Area. University of California Press. ISBN 978-0-520-27130-2.
- Taking risks: a Jewish youth in the Soviet partisans and his unlikely life in California, Joseph Pell and Fred Rosenbaum, Muskegon, Michigan, RDR Books, 2004
- Fred Rosenbaum (2000). Visions of Reform: Congregation Emanu-El and the Jews of San Francisco, 1849-1999. Judah L. Magnes Museum. ISBN 978-0-943376-69-1.
- Free to choose: the making of a Jewish community in the American West: the Jews of Oakland, California from the gold rush to the present day, Fred Rosenbaum, Berkeley, California, Judah L. Magnes Museum, 1976
- Architects of reform: congregational and community leadership Emanu-El of San Francisco, 1849-1980, Fred Rosenbaum, Berkeley, California, Western Jewish History Center, Judah L. Magnes Museum, 1980
- Here, There Are No Sarahs: A Woman's Courageous Fight in the Soviet Partisans and Her Bittersweet Fulfillment of the American Dream, Sonia Shainwald Orbuch and Fred Rosenbaum, Muskegon, Michigan, RDR Books, 2009
- "The Pope Comes to San Francisco: An Anatomy of Jewish Communal Response to a Political Crisis", by David Biale and Fred Rosenbaum, in American pluralism and the Jewish community, editor: Seymour Martin Lipset, New Brunswick, New Jersey, Transaction Publishers, 1990, described as "a fascinating and insightful account of the playing out of the confrontational style around a Holocaust issue".
- "Zionism versus Anti-Zionism: The State of Israel Comes to San Francisco", Fred Rosenbaum, in Jews of the American West, edited by Moses Rischin and John Livingston, Detroit, Wayne State University Press, 1991
