= Phillip Blashki =

Australian businessman (1837–1916)

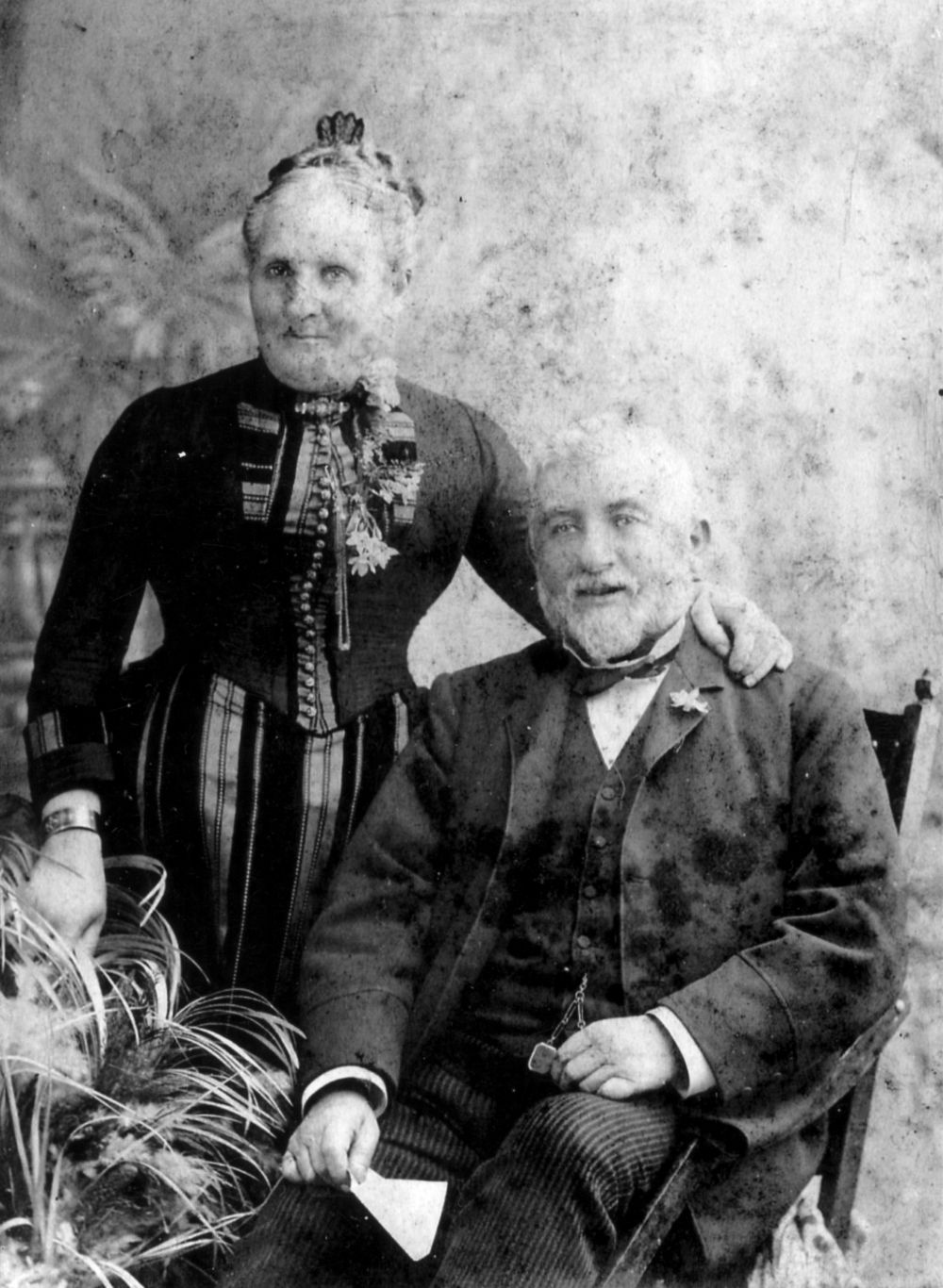
Phillip and Hannah Blashki, 1892

Phillip Blashki (21 February 1837 – 21 October 1916) was a Polish immigrant to Australia who rose to be a successful businessman, magistrate, JP, holder of many positions of public responsibility and associated with numerous community and charitable events in Melbourne.

== Youth ==
Phillip was born Favel Wagczewski in Błaszki, a Polish village near Kalisz, on 21 February 1837.

After working as a tassell-maker in Manchester he married a young Polish widow, Hannah Potash, and arrived in Melbourne on the masted ship called the 'Alice Walton' on 1 April 1858. At that time Melbourne was experiencing huge population growth due to the gold rush.

Phillip Blashki's life was summarised on the center front page of The Herald, which read in part, "For 39 years, he was a justice of the peace, and for a lengthy period he was chairman of the City Court Bench... 58 years ago he came to Victoria, and took a leading part in many public affairs. He founded the Melbourne Jewish Aid Society, was a trustee of the Brighton Cemetery, and a prominent Freemason. He was also one of the founders of the Charity Organisation Society."

Phillip and Hannah had 14 children and now over 500 descendants, mostly in Australia, have been documented.

== Career ==
Phillip was primarily a silversmith and had a stall at Melbourne's Great Exhibition of 1888. He was also an optician, watch repairer, jeweller and maker of masonic regalia. He produced several notable items of public importance, including Australian cricket's Sheffield Shield the cost of which was donated by Lord Sheffield in 1893, following his tour (led by W G Grace) of Australia of 1891–92. Blashki's tender was the one accepted. He also produced the NSW Cricketers Association's 'Hordern Shield'.

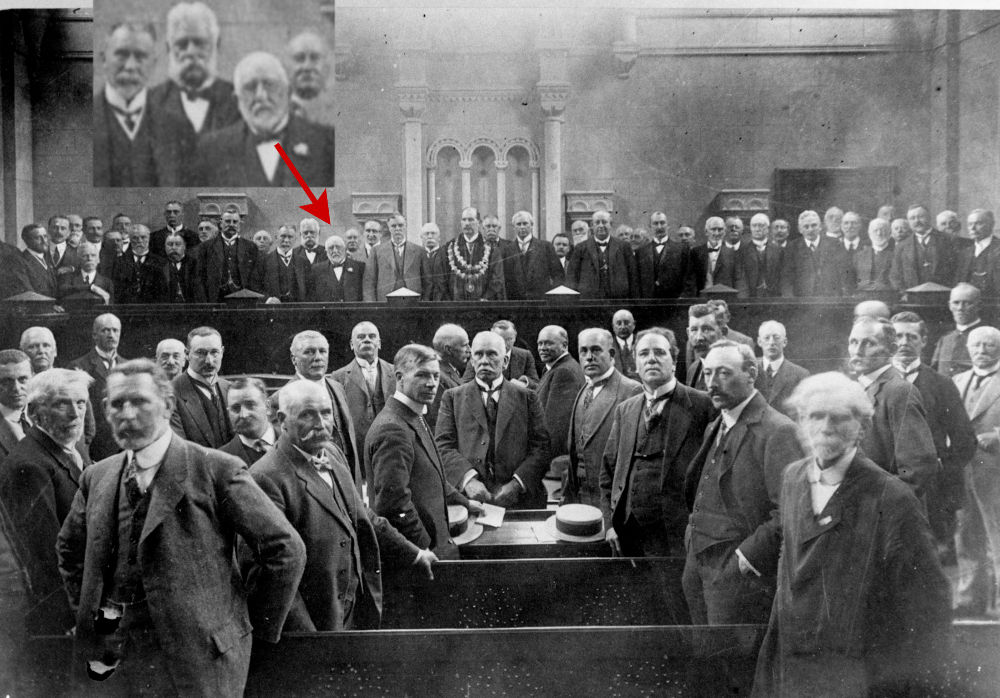
Opening of City Court, Russell Street, Melbourne, 20 January 1914, with inset showing presence of Phillip Blashki

Phillip Blashki started in Geelong as a hawker and retailer of goods during the gold rush. In 1868, following a bankrupting theft, he moved to Melbourne with his then 11 children. Around 1875 he opened his city store in Bourke Street Melbourne and grew it into a thriving business making jewellery, Masonic regalia and significant ceremonial medals and chains. His sons took over the business, 'P. Blashki & Sons', in 1893 which still continues today. Other sons went into the tobacco industry and Phillip and his sons applied for many label trademarks. The family made the first cigarettes as a way to make smoking affordable for the masses.

Phillip Blashki was a Justice of the peace for nearly 40 years and was actively involved in the Victorian judicial system. He was appointed a Magistrate in March 1911 in addition to being a JP for the entire state of Victoria. On 20 January 1914, he was one of Lord Mayor Hennesey's invited dignitaries at the opening of the Melbourne City Court at Russell St. and was appointed the first Chairman of the City Court Bench (which became the Melbourne Magistrates Court). As recognition for his work as a J.P., philanthropist and community leader, Blashki was one of the invited guests at the opening of the first federal parliament at the Exhibition Buildings.

Blashki was a council member of the Victorian Chamber of Manufacturers and was instrumental in founding and/or the early development of a number of communal and charitable organisations (including the provision of seed funding in some instances). Whilst still working in Geelong in the 1860s he was active on the new Stephen St. Melbourne branch of the Jewish Philanthropic Society (est.1848). He co-founded the Melbourne Jewish Aid Society in 1888, the Melbourne Cemetery Trust and esteemed president of the Melbourne Freemason's Homes.

== Community work ==
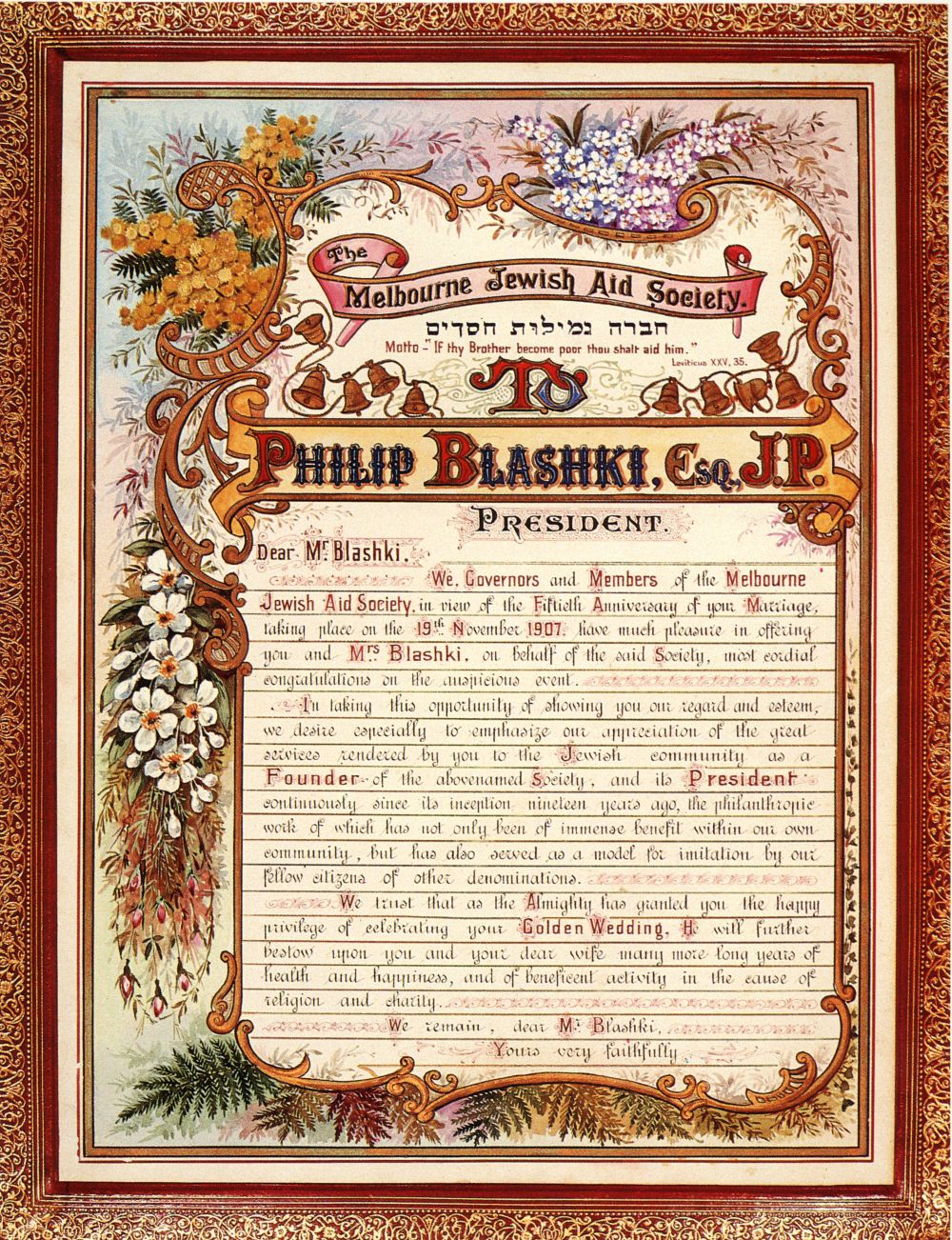
Illuminated Address for Phillip Blashki presented by the Jewish Aid Society, 1907

The name Phillip Blashki is synonymous with the history of Freemasonry in Victoria. Blashki held various offices in several Lodges over a period of 40+ years and was appointed District Grand Warden under the British Constitution.

Phillip Blashki was the first Trustee for the Jewish section of Brighton Cemetery. He established the Tahara house for Jewish burials and set a precedent for purchasing half sized graves for children. In 1909 he co-founded the Jewish Burial Society (Chevra Kadisha) to cater for Eastern European immigrants, but available for all Jews today.

He was a J.P. for all the bailiwicks of Melbourne and an assessor and Hon. magistrate in Gipps Ward. His success is what led the Attorney General of Victoria to appoint him as chairman of the new City Court Bench. Decades after the Corio Bay drowning of his wife Hannah's son Hyman, a good swimmer, his position as Magistrate enabled him to order that the Melbourne City Baths Corporation Swimming Pool would be open free for all children to learn to swim.

The success of the Jewish Aid Society, for which he received the illuminated address pictured, led to the Victorian government establishing a Charity Organisation Society with similar objectives and he remained on their committee for many years. On his 70th birthday another illuminated address signed by thirty solicitors practising in the Russell St.court, was handed to him by the then Prime Minister, Alfred Deakin.

Blashki was particularly interested in advancing Jewish education. He was first president of the Board of the East Melbourne Hebrew School. This became the United Jewish Education Board, with Victorian Attorney General Isaac Isaacs as its president and Phillip Blashki as its treasurer and succeeding president. He also acted as chairman to the Board of Advice to the Victorian Education Department for the East Melbourne District.

Blashki was a foundation member and a term vice-president of the Victorian Employer's Federation, co-founded the Jewish Herald Association and was on the board of the Benevolent Asylum and the Montefiore Homes.
