= Asher Weiss =

Israeli rabbi and author

Rabbi Asher Weiss אשר וייס
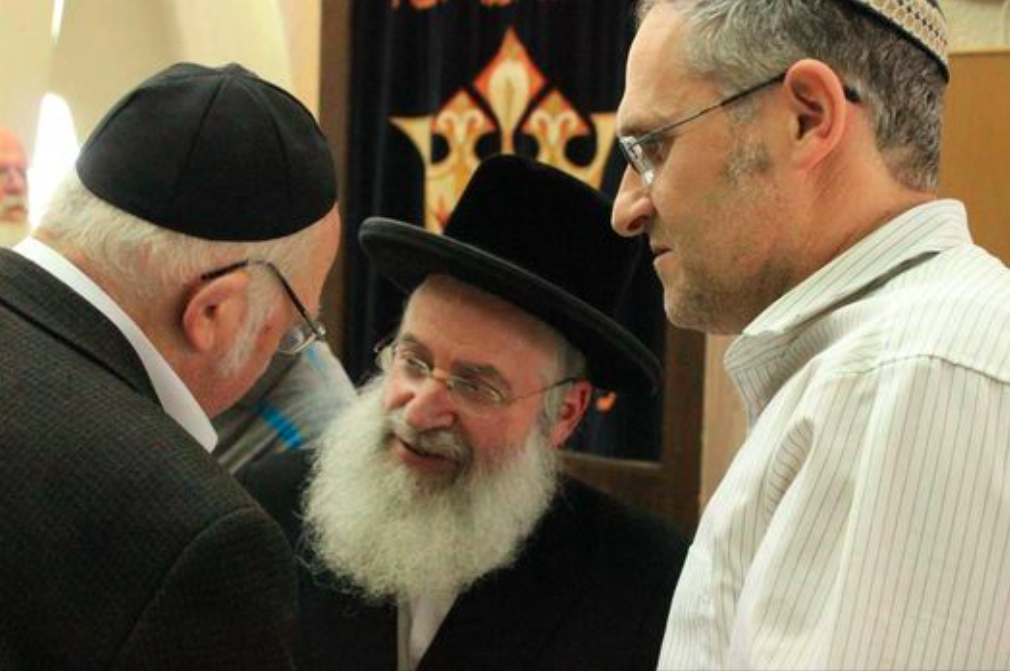
- Rabbi Weiss with Rabbis Aharon Lichtenstein (left) and Mosheh Lichtenstein (right)

Personal life
- Born: March 25, 1953 (age 73) United States
- Spouse: Pesia Yenta Weiss
- Children: 7
- Parent: Moshe Weiss
- Dynasty: Sanz-Klausenburg dynasty

Religious life
- Religion: Judaism
- Denomination: Orthodox Judaism

Jewish leader
- Position: Rosh Yeshiva
- Yeshiva: Darchei Moshe
- Organisation: Beis Din Tzedek Darchei Torah
- Dynasty: Sanz-Klausenburg dynasty

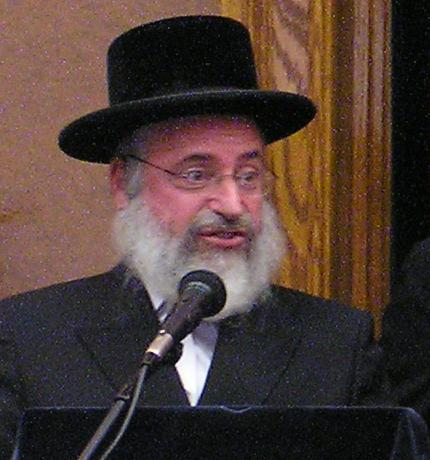
Weiss in 2007

Harav Asher (Usher, Osher) Zelig Weiss (Hebrew: אשר וייס; born March 25, 1953) is a posek (decisor on points of Jewish law), rosh kollel (dean) of Machon Minchas Asher L’Torah V’Horaah and author of the Minchas Asher. He grew up in a Klausenberger hasidic family in Borough Park, Brooklyn.

== Biography ==
Weiss was born in the United States where his father, Holocaust survivor Moshe Weiss, was a real estate agent. He was born on the Lower East Side of Manhattan; when he was six, the family moved to Borough Park, and from the age of ten he travelled by three trains every day to the Klausenburg cheder in Williamsburg. His cheder rebbe was Rav Boruch Eisenberg, whom he met again decades later at an Agudah convention; Eisenberg died young. Moshe was one of the founders of the Klausenburg shtiebel on 13th Avenue in Borough Park, and the family lived at 1341 54th Street; Weiss had three older brothers. He studied at Sanz institutions in the United States. In 1966 the family immigrated to Israel and lived in Kiryat Sanz in Netanya, where he studied and was close to Rabbi Yekusiel Yehudah Halberstam. In 2005 he founded Yeshivat Darchei Torah, which he headed. In its early years, Rabbi Baruch Dov Povarsky, head of the Ponevezh Yeshiva, worked with him.

Weiss is a Torah scholar whose lectures and halachic responsa influence poskim (decisors of points of Jewish law) internationally. Weiss is posek for Shaarei Tzedek Medical Center, maintains a rabbinic court, Beis Din Tzedek Darchei Torah, and heads kollelim (religious schools for adult men). The Keren Hachesed ‘Chasdei Pesia’ is a charity established in memory of his wife, Pesia Yenta Weiss. He is the Rosh Kollel of Machon Minchas Asher L’Torah V’Horaah.

Weiss wrote the Minchas Asher books on Jewish holidays, Torah, medicine and responsa. In 2021, he published a volume of the Minchas Asher responsa, which deals with the issues raised by the COVID-19 pandemic in Israel and its implications in Halakha (Jewish law).

== Family ==
Weiss was married to Pesiah Zalmanowitz, the daughter of Rabbi Yisroel Aryeh Zalmanowitz, and together, they had seven children — six daughters and one son. She died in 2018.
