= Simon Bloomberg =

Jewish humanitarian

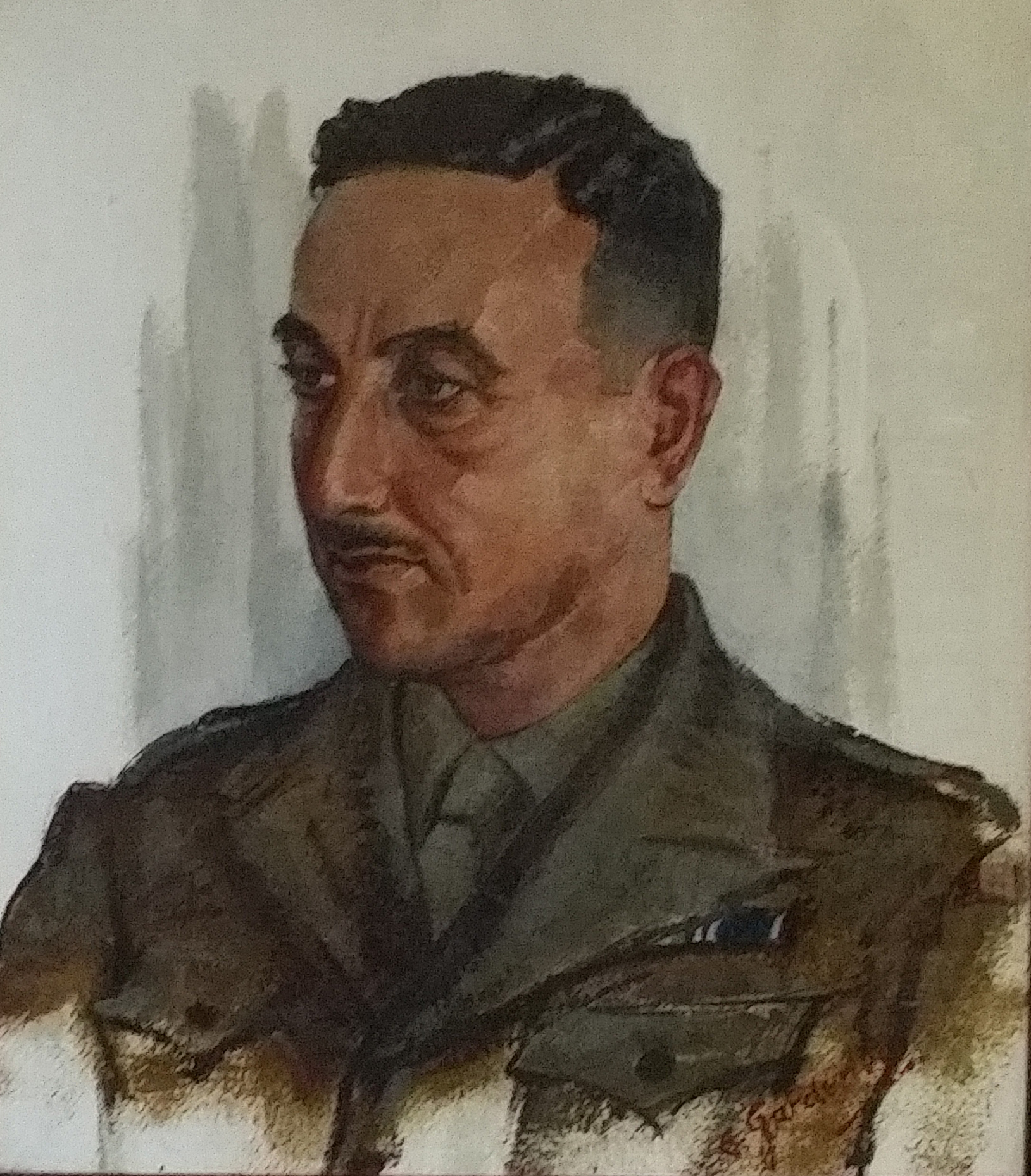
Portrait of the late Simon Bloomberg.

Simon Bloomberg (1894–1981) CBE, was a Jewish humanitarian known for his work to resettle the displaced persons of Europe after World War II. He was the UNRRA Director of the Bergen-Belsen displaced persons camp after World War II and European Director of the Jewish Relief Fund.

== Early life ==
Bloomberg was born in England on 11 September 1894, the son of Lazarus Bloomberg and Annie Benjamin. He fought in the British Army in World War I, enlisting on 1 December 1915. He served in France and Flanders (Belgium). After the War he joined HM Colonial Service where he worked in East Africa and Jamaica. He retired from the Colonial Service at age 50 to join the United Nations Relief and Rehabilitation Administration (UNRRA).

== Work with Displaced Persons (DPs) ==
Bloomberg joined UNRRA in May 1945 just after the liberation of the Bergen-Belsen concentration camp. During his first year he worked as Director of Polish Ukrainian Camps in Germany, where he helped to resettle refugees from all over Europe. In June 1946 his focus turned towards helping Jewish survivors of the Holocaust when he became Director of Bergen-Belsen, (Hohne) – the first Jew in this position. It was considered that his appointment would help foster better relations between UNRRA and the 11,000 Jewish refugees in the camp.

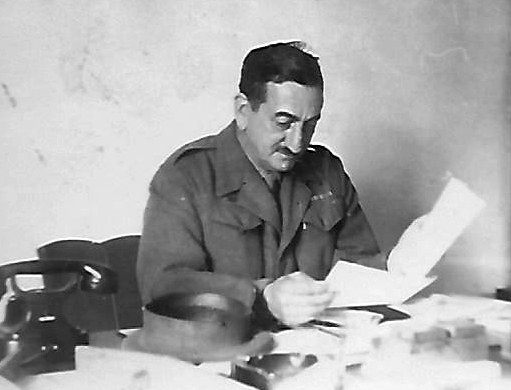
UNRRA Camp Director, Simon Bloomberg at work in the Bergen-Belsen Displaced Persons Camp, in 1946.

Bloomberg brought about changes at the camp including increased distribution of food and clothing amongst the 11,000 strong community of Holocaust survivors. He fought for the right of Jewish refugees from Eastern Europe to be allowed to enter Bergen-Belsen and resigned in protest when UNRRA ruled they did not consider them to be displaced persons or entitled to receive rations.

However Bloomberg stayed at Bergen-Belsen, but joined the Jewish Committee For Relief Abroad. In his new position as European Director of the Jewish Relief Fund, he was able to continue assisting the people of the camp until 1948 when the State of Israel was founded and the camp's DP population started moving slowly to what they considered to be their homeland.

"Those who are left wait for the day when they can shake the bloodstained dust of Germany from their feet and start a new life in a free land, far away from this land of dreadful memories, please God that it may be soon," Bloomberg wrote in his diary at the time.

German historians, Angelika Konigseder and Juliane Wetzel wrote about Bloomberg's humanitarian efforts in their book Waiting for Hope: Jewish Displaced Persons in Post-World War II Germany. "Bloomberg had been an officer in the British Colonial Service. He knew the official mind and could talk on equal terms with the military and civil authorities. There was soon a different atmosphere at Belsen. The newly appointed supply officer was soon a very popular person with camp residents."

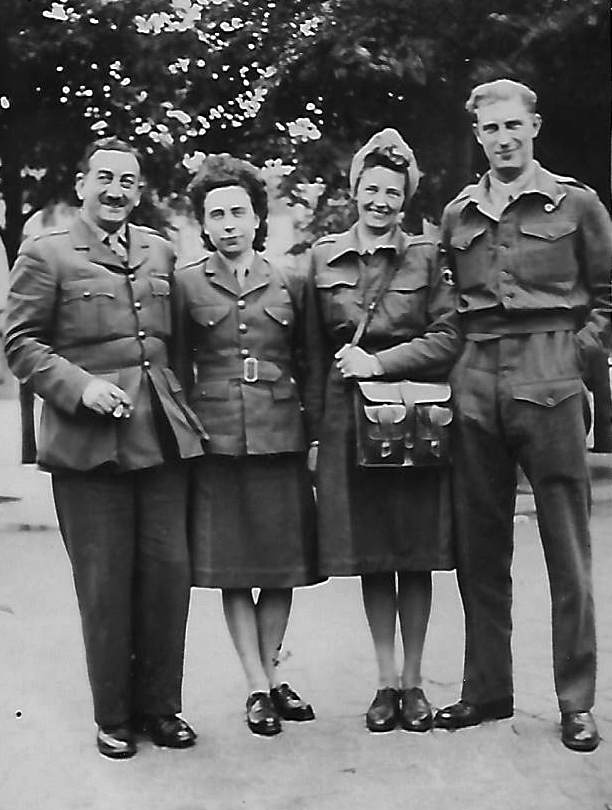
Simon Bloomberg (left) with other UNRRA officials in Germany, in 1946.

As European Field Director Bloomberg also worked with the American Jewish Joint Distribution Committee helping to facilitate the distribution of supplies from individual donors through the established channels of the British and USA Zones. He also helped launch the Central British Fund Appeal in the interest of Jewish DPs and Jewish communities all over Europe, speaking in London where he described his experiences as Belsen's camp director.

== Awards ==
In 1946 Bloomberg received a Certificate of Merit from UNRRA recording "the loyal and valued services of Simon Bloomberg to the United Nations Relief and Rehabilitation Administration in its Great Work of Relieving the Suffering and Saving the Lives of the Victims of War in the Liberated Countries."

The Jewish Committee for Relief Abroad (Germany, Austria, Italy, Holland, Greece, North Africa, Egypt) and Jewish Relief Fund honoured his work with a certificate signed by its chairman, Leonard Cohen. "Presented to Mr Simon Bloomberg in recognition of devoted service in helping the survivors of Nazi persecution to rebuild their lives."

In 1951 Bloomberg was awarded an CBE.

== Writings ==
A prolific writer, Bloomberg kept diaries throughout his life, including a detailed account of his time in post war Germany, in manuscript format, entitled Tales of the Survivors of Belsen and Other Camps in Europe. This was published posthumously in 2017 under the title 'Life After Belsen' – A first-hand account of the survivors of Bergen-Belsen and other horror camps in Europe after World War II.

The Jewish Echo published Bloomberg's article about the work of the Jewish Relief Unit in 'the Exodus Camps' of Germany entitled Bricks Without Straw – A Lesson in Tenacity.

Bloomberg also wrote hundreds of letters to his wife, Alice and their five children. Historic documents relating to his time as JCRA Field Director, including correspondence and reports are housed in the Wiener Library for the study of the Holocaust and Genocide.

== Later life ==
After serving the displaced people of Europe for three years, Bloomberg was reunited with his family in the UK. He continued to travel extensively and spent long and short spells in different countries. He relocated to Jamaica in the 1950s where he went back into Government service, but continued to help displaced individuals where needed. In 1956 he assisted Hungarian refugees in Vienna and Egyptian Refugees in 1957. In 1958 he moved to New Zealand where he spent four years, returning to England in 1962 to settle in Winchester. With five children, one in Canada, one in the USA, one in New Zealand and two in England his final years were spent visiting these countries. He died in the UK on 23 April 1981.
