= Yoel Halpern =

Polish rabbi (1904–1983)

Rabbi Yoel Halpern Hebrew: הרב יואל הלפרן
- Title: Rabbi of Jasło

Personal life
- Born: 1904 Kraków, Poland
- Died: 6 September 1983 (aged 78–79)

Religious life
- Religion: Judaism
- Denomination: Orthodox
- Other: Rabbi of Bergen-Belsen and the British Occupation Zone of Germany
- Semikhah: Rabbi Shmuel Engel

Yoel Halpern (1904 – 6 September 1983) was a Polish rabbi. He was the rabbi of Jasło, Poland prior to the Holocaust. After the Holocaust, he was one of the rabbis of Bergen-Belsen and of the British Occupation Zone in Germany. After emigrating to the United States he was a rabbi in Brooklyn, New York.

== Biography ==
Rabbi Yoel Halpern was born in Kraków in 1904. His father Rabbi Mattisyahu Chaim was the rabbi of Dobczyce.

Rabbi Halpern received his rabbinical ordination from rabbi Shmuel Engel of Radomshile.

== Jasło ==
When he came of age, Halpern married Dina, the daughter of rabbi Elimelech Rubin who was the rabbi of Jasło. After marriage, Halpern founded a yeshiva and a bais yaakov in Jasło. Subsequently, Halpern was appointed Rabbi of Jasło.

== During the Holocaust ==
When World War II began, Rabbi Halpern attempted to flee the Nazis but he was arrested by the Russians while crossing the border. When he was released from prison, he moved to Bukhara where he was a spiritual advisor to his fellow refugees.

== Leadership roles in Germany ==
=== Rabbi of Bergen-Belsen and of the British Occupation Zone in Germany ===
After World War II ended, Halpern moved to Bergen-Belsen, where was appointed as rabbi. He officiated over 1,800 weddings of Holocaust survivors and circumcised more than 1,500 boys. He also permitted hundreds of agunot to remarry.

=== Leader of the "Vaad Harabanim of the British Zone" ===
Rabbi Halpern was the founder and leader of the "Vaad Harabanim (council of Rabbis) of the British Zone". The Vaad consisted of many notable Rabbis in the British zone, including Rabbi Chaim Pinchas Lubinsky (Hannover), Rabbi Shlomo Zev Zweigenhaft (Hannover), Rabbi Yisroel Aryeh Zalmanowitz (Bergen-Belsen), Rabbi Yisroel Moshe Olewski (Celle)., Rabbi Yissocher Berish Rubin (Bergen-Belsen) and Rabbi Yitzchak Glickman (Bergen-Belsen). On several occasions the Vaad formed a bais din in Hannover and in other smaller communities in the zone.

== In the United States ==
In 1949, the British occupation of North-West Germany ended and the British Chief Rabbi's Religious Emergency Council and its appointees were required to wrap up their operations in Germany. Halpern then emigrated to the United States. He settled in Brownsville and where he was the Rabbi of a synagogue. Later he moved to Boro Park where he was a rabbi and the leader "Merkaz Chinuch Hatorah" (Center for Torah Education).

Rabbi Halpern died on 6 September 1983.

== Family ==
Halpern's wife Dina and their three children were not able to escape when the Nazis invaded Poland and were murdered in the Holocaust.
