= Zvi Asaria =

Austro-Hungarian-born German-Israeli rabbi

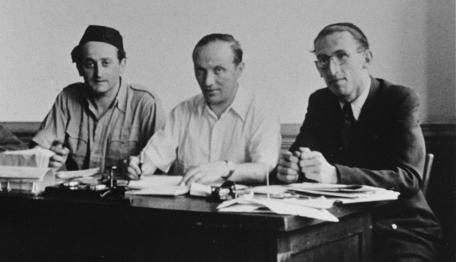
Left to right: Rabbi Zvi Helfgott (later Rabbi Zvi Asaria), Josef Rosensaft and Rabbi Joseph Asher, members of the Central Jewish Committee for the British Zone of Germany. Photo taken at Bergen-Belsen, probably in 1947..

Zvi Asaria

Zvi Asaria (Hebrew: צבי אסריה; September 8, 1913 – December 27, 2002) was a Yugoslav-born rabbi, Holocaust survivor, theologian, author, and post-war communal leader, who advocated for dialogue between Jews and post-war Germans.

== Early life and education ==
Asaria was born as Hermann Helfgott in Beodra, in the Banat region (then part of Austria-Hungary, now Serbia). His father, Kolman, was a merchant and cantor; the family was poor, with six people living in two rooms. After attending a community high school in nearby Veliki Bečkerek (now Zrenjanin, Serbia), he studied at the newly founded Jewish Theological Seminary in Sarajevo before moving to Vienna in 1934 to pursue a doctorate at the Faculty of Philosophy at the University, while pursuing rabbinical training at the theological school. He had to leave before finishing his degree after the Anschluss; he went to Budapest where he finished his Ph.D., and was ordained as a rabbi.

== War years ==
He was a rabbi briefly in Yugoslavia before being drafted into the Yugoslav army as a chaplain. In spring 1941 he was captured by the Germans and spent four years as a POW. After a year as a prisoner, he and his Jewish comrades were sent by cattle car to a camp near Osnabruck; there he organized Jewish life for the soldiers. After several more deportations, he ended up on a 400 km. forced POW death march in the winter of 1944-45 from Meyenburg to Brandenburg; those too weak to walk were shot. He escaped captivity near the end of the war. With the war not over, he went to the Bergen-Belsen concentration camp, recently liberated by the British. He provided spiritual guidance for survivors, arranged for burials for those that died after liberation and worked in the rescue effort. The war was still raging, and ambulances and other supplies were preferably sent to the front. When he asked for ambulances to take away the very sick, he was told there were none and he broke down, crying. He persisted, and with the help of the commanding officer, a Czech Jew, there were ten ambulances the next day. "He had a striking personality and a beautiful singing voice," was popular and helped maintain morale. He was considered to be the foremost Halakhic authority in the British zone.

== Post-war ==
In 1947 he represented the World Jewish Congress, campaigning for the future State of Israel, supporting illegal immigration to Palestine and, was named Chief Rabbi of the British occupation zone, visiting Jewish communities in that region. He moved to Israel in 1948, changing his name to Zvi Asaria. He fought in the 1948 Arab-Israeli War as a major.

Having difficulty in finding a rabbinate position in Israel, he returned to Germany in 1953 as a cultural attaché to the Israeli mission in Cologne and soon became a community rabbi in Cologne. After the desecration of his synagogue he left for Israel in 1961, and had a part-time rabbinate position in Israel. Returning to Germany, from 1966 to 1970 he was the state rabbi in Lower Saxony. He doubted that the Jewish community in Germany had a viable future. He noted the lack of Jewish schools, and the absence of religious life and cultural activities. He claimed that the German rabbis were only figureheads for the Jewish communities, to meet with authorities. He was active in dialogue with the German community, particularly the young, asking them to know about the crimes of the past. "We are tolerated, that's all," he opined.

Asari helped establish the Sh'erit ha-Pletah movement in post-war Europe, acting on behalf of the 250,000 Jews in DP camps.

In 1970 he returned to Israel, devoting his time to writing. Apart from journalism, his works included Wir sind Zeugen and The Jews in Lower Saxony. In 1998 he was awarded the Lower Saxony Order of Merit 1st Class by Gerhard Schröder. In 2000, Asaria took part in a commemoration event in Bergen-Belsen for the last time. He died in Israel in 2002.

== Personal ==
In 1950 Asaria married Malka Bodner, a native of Antwerp.

His personal papers and collections were later deposited at Yad Vashem and in German archives. Among the 25 cartons of this material were his diary of his four years as a POW and correspondence of agunot, Jewish women unable to get divorces and re-marry because their husbands could not be found.

All of Asari's family were murdered in the Holocaust except for himself.
