= Josef Rosensaft =

Polish-born Holocaust survivor and American art collector (1911–1975)

Josef Rosensaft (January 15, 1911 – September 11, 1975) was a Holocaust survivor who led the community of Jewish displaced persons (Sh'erit ha-Pletah) through the establishment of a Central Committee of Liberated Jews that first served the interests of the refugees in Bergen-Belsen DP camp and then DP camps throughout the entire British sector.

Rosensaft was born to an affluent scrap-metal dealer in Będzin in Poland and was in his youth active in the Zionist Labor Movement. He was deported to Auschwitz in 1943 but escaped the transport by jumping into the Vistula River. He was injured by gunfire during the escape but walked back to Będzin, where he was captured again, given 250 lashes and confined to a chicken cage, before being sent to Auschwitz and several other concentration camps until he was sent on a death march to Bergen-Belsen, where he was liberated on April 15, 1945. He weighed 76 lbs when he was liberated.

While researching their family history, Josef’s son, the noted activist Menachem Rosensaft, discovered that his father had been issued a certificate of citizenship for Paraguay. In Josef’s case, it had not arrived on time. This was one of many Latin American letters and documents produced by Rudolf Hügli and other members of the Lados group, whose network saved many lives.

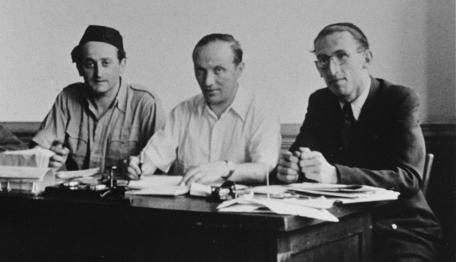
Left to right: Rabbi Zvi Helfgott (later Rabbi Zvi Asaria), Joseph Rosensaft and Rabbi Joseph Asher, members of the Central Jewish Committee for the British Zone of Germany. Photo taken at Bergen-Belsen, probably in 1947..

Rosensaft was elected by the refugees in the DP camp to the Central Committee of Liberated Jews and served as the chairman of the British sector committee until it was disbanded in 1950. In addition to promoting the rights and interests of the refugees, he was an active opponent of the British policy of restrictive Jewish immigration to the British Mandate of Palestine. He met and married a fellow survivor, doctor Hadassah (Ada) Bimko, in the camp, and they had a son, Menachem Z. Rosensaft.

After his time in the DP camp, Rosensaft went into the art collection and real estate business and lived in Montreux, Switzerland before moving to the United States in the late 1950s. He founded and served as president of the World Federation of Bergen-Belsen Survivors, and led a delegation of 200 Belsen survivors to the former camp in 1970 to commemorate the 25th anniversary of its liberation. He was known as an uncompromising advocate for Holocaust remembrance, often saying that he would "never forget, and never forgive."

He died in London while on a business trip there but was buried in New York City. He left a formidable art collection that had to be sold to settle debts related to the acquisition of the art and by some accounts an extravagant lifestyle. The 1976 sale arranged by Sotheby's was bought in its entirety by the Tehran Museum of Contemporary Art, where it all remains today. This sale set a record for a piece by Paul Gauguin called Still Life with Japanese Woodcut at $1.4 million, and the work is currently valued at $45 million.
