= Hadassah Rosensaft =

Polish-born Holocaust survivor and Jewish activist (1912–1997)

- Born: Hadassah Bimko; August 26, 1912; Sosnowiec, Poland
- Died: October 3, 1997 (aged 85); Manhattan, New York, US
- Spouse: Josef Rosensaft (m. 1946; died 1975)

Hadassah Bimko Rosensaft, MD (August 26, 1912 – October 3, 1997) was a Polish-born Jewish Holocaust survivor. She is credited with saving thousands of Holocaust victims.

== Biography ==
Rosensaft was born on August 26, 1912, in Sosnowiec, Poland. She studied dentistry at the University of Nancy, in France. Rosensaft graduated in 1935, with a degree in dental surgery. She soon returned to Sosnowiec, where she found employment as a dentist. On August 2-3, 1943, Rosensaft was deported to Auschwitz-Birkenau together with approximately five thousand Jews from the ghetto of Sosnowiec. Her parents, husband, and five-and-a-half-year-old son were immediately sent to their deaths in the gas chambers. Her life was saved in order to work as a doctor under Josef Mengele. In this capacity, Rosensaft saved many lives by smuggling medical materials to them, and doctoring and disguising their wounds. She would arrange to have patients scheduled for "selection" not to be available.

On November 14, 1944, Rosensaft was placed in charge of what would grow to be over 150 children at Bergen-Belsen concentration camp. She cared for them until the camp was liberated by British forces on April 15, 1945. Two days later, H.L. Glyn Hughes placed Rosensaft in charge of caring for all of the camp's wounded. After the war was over, in 1945, Rosensaft became a member of the Central Committee of Liberated Jews, and would later be elected its vice-chair. In 1946, she married Josef Rosensaft, chair of the Central Jewish Committee in the British Zone of Germany and of the Jewish Committee of Bergen Belsen. She headed the Health Department of these two organizations. During the Belsen trial, she served as a key witness. Rosensaft would help identify 15 of the defendants including Josef Kramer (known as the "Beast of Belsen").

After eight years in Montreux, Josef and Hadassah Rosensaft moved to New York. She served as honorary president of the World Federation of Bergen-Belsen Associations, and later became a member of the Presidents Commission on the Holocaust in 1978. Rosensaft was named to the council of the United States Holocaust Memorial Museum in 1980 by Jimmy Carter. She was also appointed chair of the Archives and Library Committee of the United States Holocaust Memorial Museum. In 1991 she conducted interviews with fifteen survivors--including Chana Birnbaum, Rachel Frankowitz, and Ester Greenberg-- about their childhood experiences for the United States Holocaust Museum Oral Histories. In 1992, President of the United States George Bush, President of Israel Chaim Herzog, New York City Mayor David Dinkins, and Jerusalem Mayor Teddy Kollek sent personal greetings to Hadassah Rosensaft on her eightieth birthday. She died of liver failure on October 3, 1997, at Tisch Hospital in New York City.

The Rosensafts' son Menachem, who was born in the Displaced Persons Camp adjacent to Bergen-Belsen, became a published poet, attorney, and Holocaust activist, serving as the vice president and general counsel for the World Jewish Congress. In 2022, Menachem Rosensaft accompanied Israel President Isaac Herzog in an official visit to Bergen-Belsen. Herzog recalled that his father, the sixth president of Israel, Chaim Herzog, was an officer in the British Army contigent that liberated Bergen-Belsen.
