= Moses Rischin =

American historian (1925–2020)

Moses Rischin (1925 – August 17, 2020) was an American historian, author, lecturer, editor, and emeritus professor of history at San Francisco State University. He was considered an authority on American ethnic and immigration history and a pioneer in the field of American Jewish history, with a particular interest in Abraham Cahan. He won the 1963 National Jewish Book Award for his book The Promised City: New York's Jews, 1870-1914 (1962).

== Early life and education ==
Rischin was born in 1925 and born and raised in Brooklyn, New York City. His undergraduate studies were at Brooklyn College. Harvard University awarded him a Ph.D. in 1957 for a thesis advised by historian of immigration Oscar Handlin. During his time at Harvard, he produced the major bibliographical work An Inventory of American Jewish History (1954).

== Career ==
After graduating from Harvard, Rischin taught at Brandeis University and at the University of California, Los Angeles. In 1963, he won the National Jewish Book Award for his book The Promised City: New York's Jews, 1870-1914 (1962).

Rischin became a professor at San Francisco State University in 1964. In addition to his professorship, he sat on the board for the Journal of American Ethnic History and on the council of the American Jewish History Society. He served as president of the Immigration and Ethnic History Society 1976–1979.

Rischin was the longtime director of the Western Jewish History Center, at the Judah L. Magnes Museum, from its founding in 1967. From 2005 until approximately 2010, an annual lecture was given there in his name.

He was considered an authority on American ethnic and immigration history and a pioneer in the field of American Jewish history. He was particularly recognized as a historian of the life and influence of Abraham Cahan. Historian Selma Berrol, however, has challenged the minimal treatment Rischin has given to the tensions between earlier German Jews and later Russian Jews in America.

Rischin coined the phrase new Mormon history in a 1969 article of the same name.

A festschrift collection of historical essays, An Inventory of Promises: Essays on American Jewish History in Honor of Moses Rischin, was published in his honor in 1996.

During the Monica Lewinsky scandal, Rischin was a signatory of "Historians in Defense of the Constitution" wherein 400 historians criticized efforts to impeach President Bill Clinton.

== Death ==
Rischin died of COVID-19 on August 17, 2020.

== In popular culture ==
A character in the 1967 novel Meyer Meyer by Helen Hudson may have been partly modeled after Rischin.

== Selected works ==
=== Books ===
- The Promised City: New York's Jews, 1870-1914 (Harvard University Press) ISBN 978-0674715011
- Jews of the American West, with John Livingston (Wayne State University Press) ISBN 0-8143-2171-2
- The American Gospel of Success, Individualism and Beyond, Edited with an Introduction by Moses Rischin (A Quadrangle Paperback)

=== Articles and essays ===
- "The New Mormon History", The American West 6, March 1969, 49.
- "The Jewish Experience in America: A View from the West"
- Foreword to California Jews (2003) Brandeis University Press

== See also ==
- Moore, Deborah Dash (Fall 1995). "I'll take Manhattan: reflections on Jewish studies". Judaism: A Quarterly Journal of Jewish Life and Thought. 44 (4). Archived from the original on 2014-01-12 – via Questia.
