= Bogdan Vodă =

- Commune
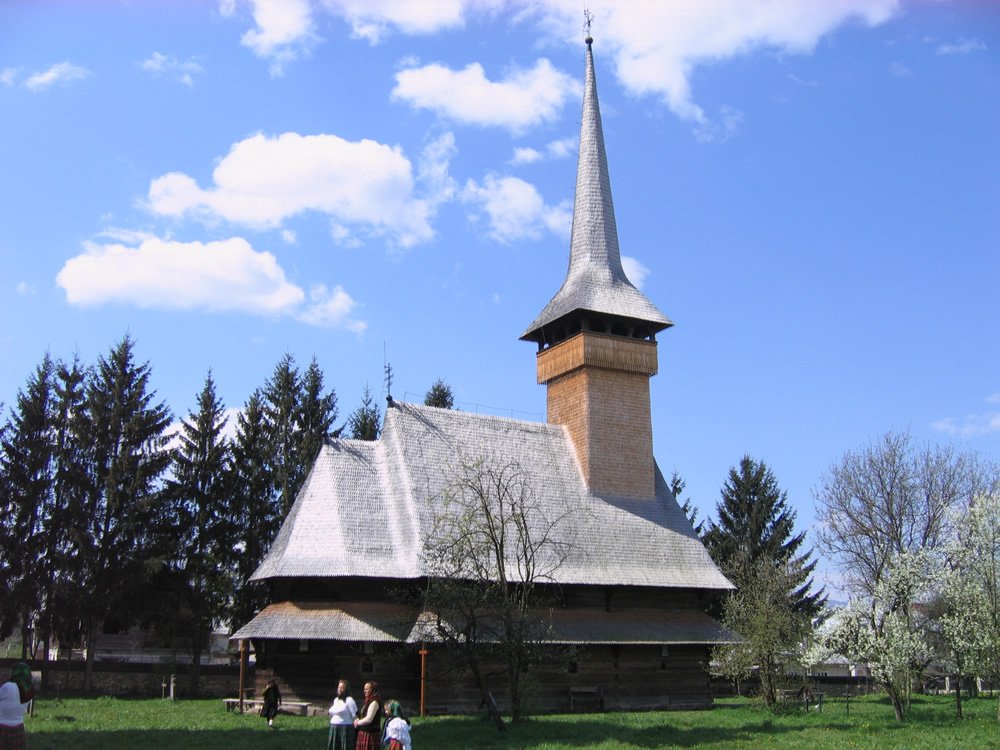
- Saint Nicholas' wooden church in Bogdan Vodă

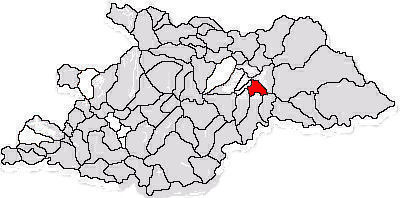
- Location in Maramureș County

- Location in Romania
- Coordinates: 47°41′25″N 24°16′10″E
- Country: Romania
- County: Maramureș
- Subdivisions: Bocicoel, Bogdan Vodă

Government
  - Mayor (2020–2024): Anuța Enea-Bizău (PNL)
- Area: 34.28 km^{2} (13.24 sq mi)
- Elevation: 401 m (1,316 ft)
- Population (2021-12-01): 2,619
  - Density: 76.40/km^{2} (197.9/sq mi)
- Time zone: UTC+02:00 (EET)
  - Summer (DST): UTC+03:00 (EEST)
- Postal code: 437055
- Area code: (+40) 0262
- Vehicle reg.: MM
- Website: primariabogdanvoda.ro

Bogdan Vodă (until 1968 Cuhea; Hungarian: Konyha (until 1901) or Izakonyha (after 1901), Yiddish: קעכניא, romanized: Kechnie, German: Konyhau) is a commune in Maramureș County, Maramureș, Romania. The commune was named after its significant native, Bogdan I, the second founder of Moldavia.

It is composed of two villages: Bocicoel (Hungarian: Kisbocskó) and Bogdan Vodă.

Historical population
| Year | Pop. | ±% |
|---|---|---|
| 1880 | 1,948 | — |
| 1900 | 2,455 | +26.0% |
| 1910 | 3,137 | +27.8% |
| 1930 | 3,376 | +7.6% |
| 1956 | 4,261 | +26.2% |
| 1977 | 4,239 | −0.5% |
| 1992 | 3,951 | −6.8% |
| 2002 | 3,411 | −13.7% |
| 2011 | 3,208 | −6.0% |
| 2021 | 2,619 | −18.4% |
Source: Census data
