= Bergen-Belsen displaced persons camp =

Displaced persons (DP) camp in northwestern Germany

Coordinates: 52°45′52″N 9°55′00″E

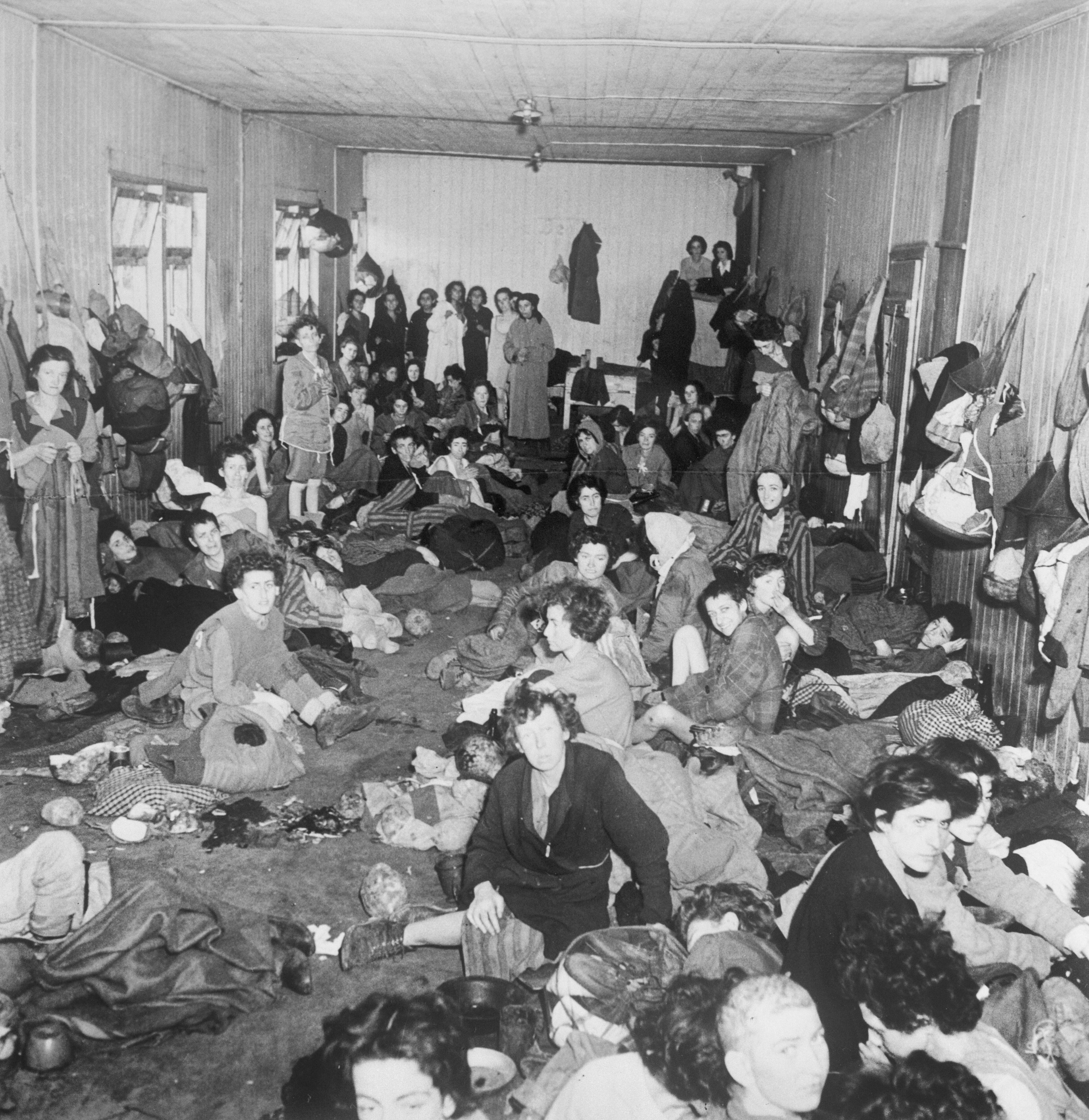
Scene of the liberation on 17/18 April 1945 in KZ Bergen-Belsen

Bergen-Belsen displaced persons camp was a displaced persons (DP) camp for refugees after World War II, in Lower Saxony in northwestern Germany, southwest of the town of Bergen near Celle. It was in operation from the summer of 1945 until September 1950. For a time, Belsen DP camp was the largest Jewish DP camp in Germany and the only one in the British occupation zone with an exclusively Jewish population. The camp was under British authority and overseen by the United Nations Relief and Rehabilitation Administration (UNRRA) with camp directors that included Simon Bloomberg. Today, the camp is a Bundeswehr barracks, having been a British Army base (see Hohne Station) until 2015.

== Location and establishment ==
On 15 April 1945 the British Army liberated the Bergen-Belsen concentration camp, which was handed over by the SS guards without a fight. Diseases and the terrible unhygienic state of the concentration camp buildings caused the British Army to relocate the former inmates and eventually to burn the prisoner huts. The survivors of the concentration camp became the first residents of the future DP camp, which was located around 2 kilometres from the main concentration camp area in former German Army barracks. These later became a British Army camp, known under the name Hohne Station. Initially, British medical staff used buildings in the former Panzertruppenschule (school for Panzer troops) as an emergency hospital to treat the former inmates away from the disastrous conditions of the concentration camp. On 21 April the first patients were moved to the new location, disinfected and issued with new clothing. This movement of people was completed by 18 May and at that point the former barracks had around 12,000 hospital beds. The British also moved the wounded German soldiers from the Wehrmacht Reservelazarett (reserve hospital, in a nearby spruce forest) to civilian hospitals and added the Reservelazarett to their hospital space. This raised the number of available beds by a further 1,600. Within the first four weeks almost 29,000 survivors from Belsen concentration camp were moved to the emergency hospital. Around 14,000 former inmates died after liberation despite the best efforts of the British Army, the British Red Cross and many others of various nationalities. By June 1945, around 11,000 of the former inmates still required emergency treatment.

The DP camp was established in July 1945 by turning the hospital wards into living quarters.

After summer 1945, only the former Wehrmacht hospital, around a kilometre from the barracks, was still used as a hospital. In January 1948, the British turned this into the central Jewish hospital for their occupation zone. It was run by the Central Committee of Liberated Jews, supported by aid organisations. The survivors named it the Glyn Hughes Hospital after British Brigadier Hugh Llewellyn Glyn Hughes, the medical officer of the 11th Armoured Division. Later still this became part of the Glyn Hughes Barracks, in what is now Hohne-Camp.

The British authorities renamed the camp 'Hohne', after a nearby abandoned settlement on the training area, in order to avoid the association with Nazi genocide at the concentration camp nearby, but the Holocaust survivors who were residents (Sh'erit ha-Pletah) in the camp refused to accept the name change and persisted in calling the DP camp 'Bergen-Belsen'. The name change only stuck after the DP camp was dissolved and the area was returned to military use. Today, the location of the former DP camp remains off-limits to the public. Even though many of the buildings are not in use any more, they are in a restricted military area.

== Camp culture and politics ==
Conditions in the camp were initially quite poor, as the dire situation of the British economy prevented the Army from providing more than the bare necessities at first. There was not enough food, clothing and living space. In October 1945, there was a hunger strike and demonstration against conditions in the camp. Things started to improve only by the summer of 1946, when the population had decreased.

Many of those DPs who were not in need of medical attention were speedily repatriated. In general, this was done voluntarily only, with the notable exception of Soviet citizens — as the Soviet Union had obtained consent from its Allies that its citizens would be sent back even against their own will. In early September 1945 there were still more than 25,000 people in the DP camp. This population consisted mainly of two groups: (gentile) Poles (around 15,000) and Jews (almost 11,000), most of them also from Poland. DPs of other nationalities were largely repatriated by the fall of 1945.

=== The Polish camp ===
From June 1945 Poles and Jews had separate sections in the camp. In the Polish section, a lively social and cultural life developed. The Poles had established a Camp Committee on the day after liberation — initially its meetings were also attended by Polish Jews. A school opened in the summer of 1945, attended by up to 600 children, and two kindergartens cared for 100 children. Many Polish DPs were young adults and they started new families in the camp — there were almost 400 weddings and 200 births in the Polish camp. The Committee published newspapers. A choir, a brass band, an "International Cabaret" and a sports club ("Polonia") were established. On 2 November 1945 the Polish DPs had a service in which a wooden cross on the former concentration camp site was dedicated as a memorial.

The Polish camp was disbanded in September 1946. The remaining 4,500 Polish DPs were transferred to other camps in the British zone, as many still hesitated to return to (now communist) Poland or to Soviet-occupied eastern Poland. Eventually, around two thirds of Polish DPs in the British zone returned to Poland, others went to the US and Canada.

=== The Jewish camp ===
With the closure of the Polish section, Belsen became the only exclusively Jewish facility in the British sector, something for which the Jewish survivors had struggled with the British. The camp was for a while the largest Jewish DP camp in Germany. Although some had left, in late 1945 thousands of Jews who had survived the Holocaust in Poland or Hungary emigrated westward and many of them came to Belsen, although the British initially refused to give them DP status. In August 1946, the DP camp still housed more than 11,000 Jews. From then on, the British Army tried to prevent any more Jews from joining the DP camp.

A first Jewish camp committee was formed on 18 April 1945. Democratic elections were held in September 1945. The leader of the Jewish survivors, Josef Rosensaft became president of the Central Committee of Liberated Jews in the British Zone which represented not just the Belsen DPs but all Jewish DPs in the British zone. In September 1945 and July 1947 the first and second Congress of Liberated Jews in the British Zone took place in the former Wehrmacht officers' mess at Belsen—in the building later known as 'The Roundhouse'.

Under the stewardship of Rosensaft and Norbert Wollheim and Rafael Olewski, the Central Committee grew into an organization that lobbied the British on behalf of the DPs' political, social, and cultural aims, including the right to emigrate to British-controlled Palestine. Many survivors supported a self-determined Jewish presence in Palestine, even though they had not been Zionists before the war. Having lost their families, houses and possessions, they saw no future for themselves in Europe. DPs demonstrated against the British policy and sent protest notes. International contacts were established, e.g. to the Zionist Congress at Basel or the United Jewish Appeal to gain support abroad. In October 1945, David Ben-Gurion, president of the Jewish Agency for Palestine, visited the DP camp.

The refugees maintained active opposition to British restrictions on Jewish immigration to the British Mandate of Palestine, and until early 1949 (i.e. well after the establishment of the State of Israel in May 1948), British authorities did not allow free passage in or out of the camp. Nevertheless, the Haganah managed to send in agents who held secret military training programmes on the camp grounds in December 1947.

=== Camp leadership ===
In mid-June 1945, Major Leonard Berney was made commandant of Camp 4.

Both sections of the camp, Polish and Jewish, were largely self-administrating. External security was provided by the British Army. In March 1946, the British transferred administration of the camp to the United Nations Relief and Rehabilitation Agency (UNRRA) but remained responsible for security. The British (and later the UNRRA), supported by other organizations like the American Jewish Joint Distribution Committee (JDC) or Jewish Relief Unit (JRU), supplied food, clothing and medicines. But the camp inhabitants otherwise ran their own affairs. The Jewish Committee established its own court and police force, whose tasks included maintaining public order and to fight black market activities.

Former British soldier and officer in HM Colonial Service, Simon Bloomberg served as both UNRRA Director for Bergen-Belsen as well as European Director of the Jewish Committee For Relief Abroad which helped provide rations for the DPs and facilitate their eventual resettlement.

For their part, like the Poles, the Jewish refugees organized a vibrant community within the camp. Schools were established within months of the liberation. The DPs founded an elementary school as early as July 1945, and by 1948, 340 pupils attended the school. A high school, which was staffed partly by soldiers from the Jewish Brigade (the Palestinian Jewish unit of the British Army) was established in December 1945. There was a kindergarten, an orphanage, and a yeshiva (a religious school). The Organization for Rehabilitation through Training (ORT) vocational training schools organized occupational education. By mid-1947 ORT had instructed around 1,500 people in training courses that mostly lasted six months. In 1947, a kibbutz had 2,760 members. Also like the Poles, many of the Jewish survivors were young adults and in the first two years after liberation there were almost 1,000 Jewish weddings. By the time the camp was dissolved, over 1,000 children had been born in it.

A Yiddish theatre called Kazet had been founded in July 1945 by Sami Feder. It staged plays on the fate of the Jews in ghettos and concentration camps, written by himself, as well as older Yiddish plays from Eastern Europe. Kazet was in operation until the summer of 1947. In 1946, Abraham Sandman founded the Socialist-Zionist Jiddische Arbeiterbühne.

A Zionist newspaper known as Unzer Sztyme (Yiddish for "Our Voice") was published by the DPs of Belsen and became the main Jewish newspaper in the British sector. It was edited by Paul Trepman, David Rosenthal, and Rafael Olewski and had been published initially by the Jewish Committee in Celle and then by the Culture & History Committee of the Central Committee of Liberated Jews in the British Zone (headed by Olewski, Trepman, & Rosenthal).

There was considerable rabbinical leadership in the camp. The rabbis of the camp were; Rabbi Dr. Herman Helfgot a.k.a. Tzvi Asaria (previously Rabbi of the Waliki-Beczkark community in Yugoslavia), Rabbi Tzvi Hirsch Meisels (previously, Rabbi of Veitzen), Rabbi Chaim Meisels (previously, Rabbi of Sarvash), Rabbi Yoel Halpern (previously, Rabbi of Jaslow), Rabbi Yisroel Aryeh Zalmanowitz (previously, Rosh Yeshiva of Bursha) Rabbi Issachar Berish Rubin, Rabbi Yitzchak Glickman and Rabbi Yisroel Moshe Olewski (previously, Rabbi of Radziov). The Rosh Hashochtim (head of shechita) and Rav Hamachshir of the camp was Rabbi Shlomo Zev Zweigenhaft (previously, Rosh Hashochtim of Poland). There was also a Yeshiva in the camp named “She’eris Yisroel” (the remnants of Israel), the Rosh Yeshiva was Rabbi Gershon Liebman, the administrator was Rabbi Yoel Meir Potashevitz and the mashgiach was Rabbi Chaim Pinchas Lubinsky.

== Dissolution of the DP camp ==
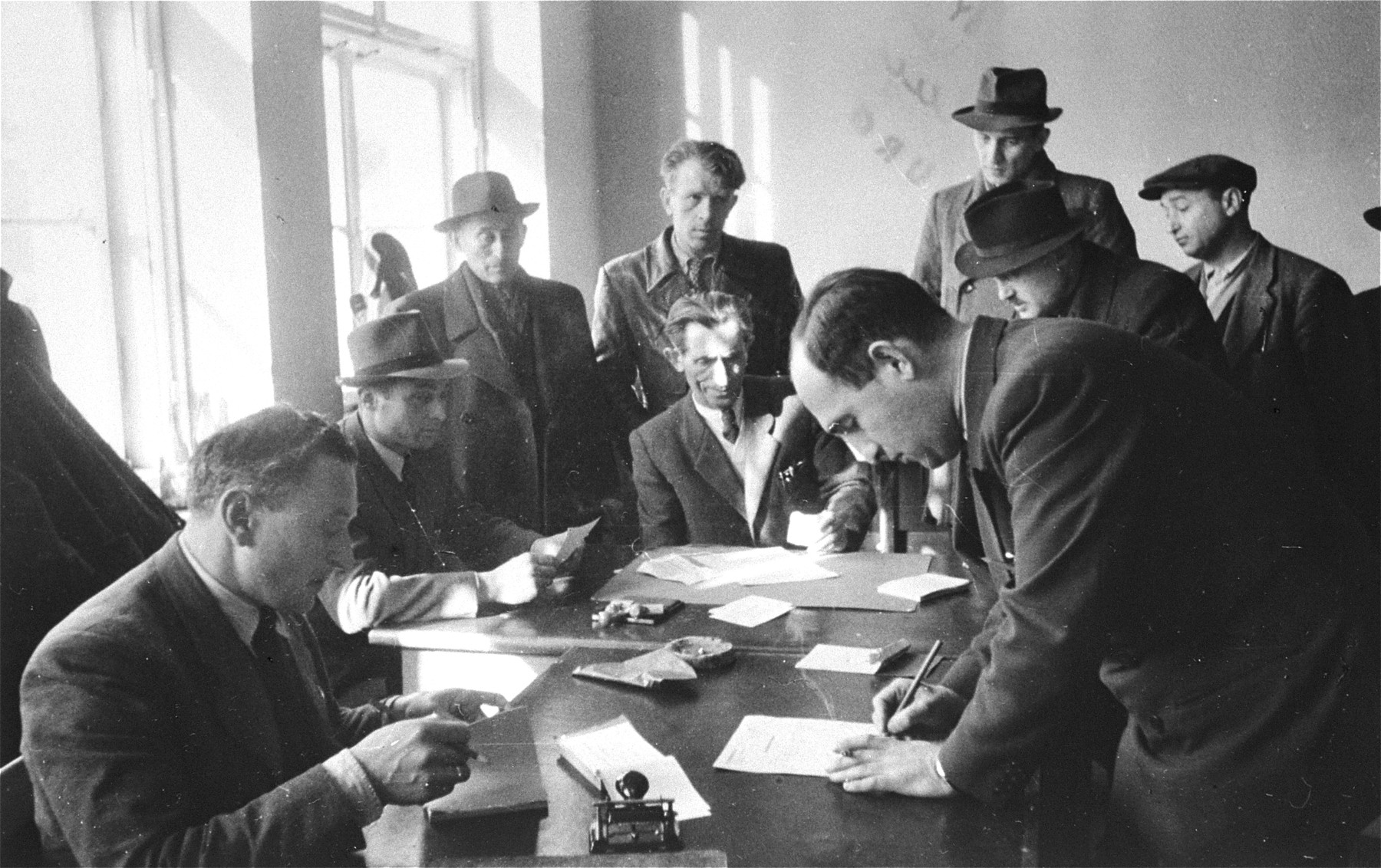
Jewish DPs sign documents for their departure to Mandatory Palestine, 1947

Large numbers of DPs began leaving the camp in 1947 as opportunities for emigration improved. Beginning in the spring of 1947, the British government allocated 300 certificates a month to Jews in the British occupation zone—these allowed legal emigration to Palestine. Between April 1947 and the founding of the State of Israel in May 1948 around 4,200 Jews from the British zone, most of them from Belsen, emigrated there legally. By March 1949, the population was down to 4,500. The DP camp at Belsen was closed in September 1950 and the remaining 1,000 people transferred to Upjever near Wilhelmshaven. This camp in turn was closed in August 1951. The majority of former Belsen DPs emigrated to the State of Israel. Many others went to the US (over 2,000) or Canada (close to 800), a minority decided to stay in Germany and helped to rebuild the Jewish communities there.

== See also ==
- London medical students at Belsen
- Rose Henriques

== Notes ==
This article incorporates text from the United States Holocaust Memorial Museum, and has been released under the GFDL.
