= Linz-Bindermichl =

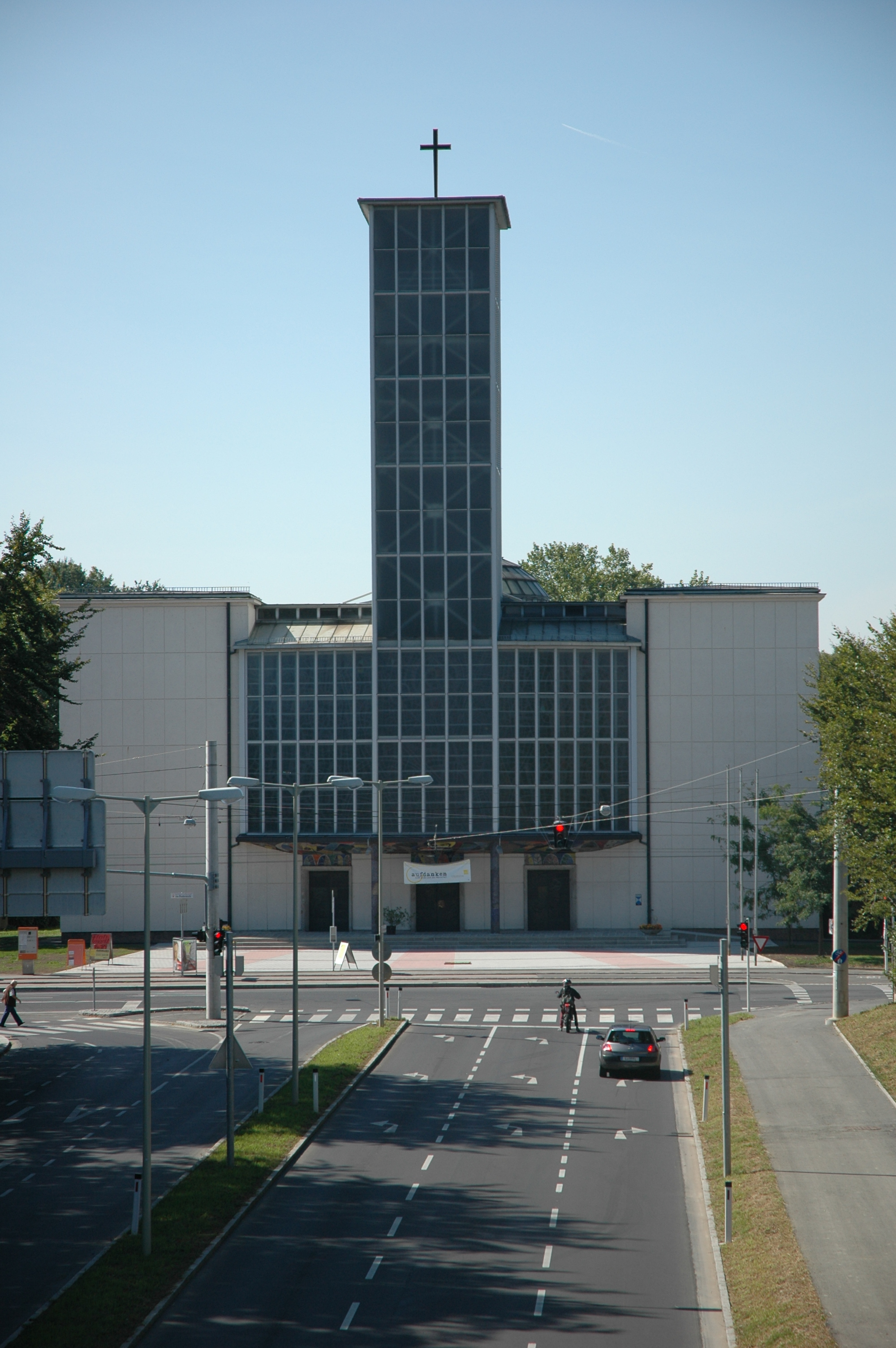
St. Michael's church, Linz-Bindermichl

Linz-Bindermichl is a suburb of Linz in Upper Austria, which was the site of a post World War II American sector displaced person camp.
