= Henry Cohen (civil servant) =

Director of Fohrenwald

Henry Cohen (June 5, 1922 – January 14, 1999) was appointed in 1946 the director of Föhrenwald, the third-largest Displaced Persons camp in the American sector of post-World War II Germany. A native of New York City and a child of Jewish immigrants from Lithuania, Cohen was a graduate of City College of New York. During World War II, he served as an infantryman in the U.S. Army.

He later served as research director of the New York City Planning Department and as Deputy City Administrator under Mayor Robert F. Wagner, Jr. Later, he was First Deputy Administrator of the New York Human Resources Administration under Mayor John Lindsay.

After leaving the city government, Cohen became the founding Dean of the Milano School of Management, Policy, and Environment at The New School.

== Early life ==
Cohen was born on the Lower East Side in New York City of parents who immigrated from Iwyea shtetl near Vilna. He graduated from junior high school P.S. 149 and Thomas Jefferson High School in Brooklyn, then from the City College of New York, and received a master's degree in Urban Planning from the Massachusetts Institute of Technology.

== Army service ==
Cohen served in the U.S. Army infantry, fighting in the Battle of the Bulge and crossing the Bridge at Remagen. After the German surrender, he was assigned to military administration.

== Föhrenwald ==
In January 1946, at the age of 23, he was appointed director of Föhrenwald, aided by a multinational team from the UNRRA. By then, the camp had an exclusively Jewish population, composed of 5,600 refugees who had survived the Holocaust.

Cohen worked to ensure favorable living conditions for the camp's residents. This included providing for Jewish religious observance and supporting the activities of Zionist political parties and youth movements. He worked with a democratically elected Camp Committee that granted a degree of administrative autonomy to its residents. The camp sponsored rehabilitation activities that included school for children, adult education and vocational training, a thriving cultural life with musical and theatrical performances, and the publication of a weekly newspaper. Besides maintaining the camp's physical conditions, particularly sanitation, Cohen endeavored to contain the black market trade that was of particular concern to the American army administration in the sector.

=== Conflict with the Army ===
During his tenure, Cohen became aware of what he considered widespread anti-Semitism among U.S. Army personnel, including expressions of such attitudes in official administrative reports. An incident in May 1946, involving GIs who reportedly threatened several Jewish camp residents visiting in the nearby town of Wolfratshausen, provoked a riot by several hundred camp residents, who surged forth from the camp, heading for the town. Cohen and his staff quelleds the riot, but still drew the animosity of the American army. An operations report filed on July 23, 1946, by the 9th Infantry Division Asst. Chief of Staff, accuses Cohen of incitement and fails to mention any impropriety on the part of American soldiers. The recurring friction between the Army and Cohen prompted a campaign for his eventual removal from the director's post.

== Service to New York City ==
After returning to the US, he received a master's degree in Urban Planning from the Massachusetts Institute of Technology, then served as Director of Research of the New York City Planning Department. He was Deputy City Administrator of New York City during the Wagner Administration. Later he was First Deputy Administrator of the New York Human Resources Administration during the Lindsay Administration.

== Later years ==
After leaving the city government, Cohen became the Founding Dean of the Milano School of Management, Policy, and Environment at The New School.

He died on January 14, 1999, in Greenwich Village at the age of 76, leaving his wife, daughter, son, and two grandchildren.
