= Bogdan Siorek =

Polish footballer (1957–2020)

Personal information
- Date of birth: 3 October 1957
- Place of birth: Rzeszów, Poland
- Date of death: 27 April 2020 (aged 62)
- Place of death: Austria
- Height: 1.81 m (5 ft 11 in)
- Position: Defender

Youth career
- Resovia

Senior career*
Years	Team	Apps	(Gls)
1975-1987	Resovia	246+	(7+)
1987–1989	Stal Stalowa Wola	27+	
1989–1990	USV Furth		
- * Club domestic league appearances and goals

Bogdan Siorek (3 October 1957 – 27 April 2020) was a Polish footballer who played as a defender. Starting his career in his hometown club Resovia, he won 2 promotions within two seasons of being in the team, one of the most successful periods in the club's history, having played 243 matches scoring 7 goals for them in the Second Division.

He then moved to Stal Stalowa Wola, where he made 27 appearances in the top division before spending another season with them after being relegated. He finished his playing career with amateur Austrian club USV Furth from Furth bei Göttweig.

After retirement, he stayed in Austria doing various jobs, such as at the Föhrenwald Golf club in Lanzenkirchen. He had family ties to Tarnobrzeg, was married and died on 27 April 2020.

== Honours ==
Resovia

- III liga, group IV: 1976–77
