= Nantovinus =

Nantovinus (also known as Conrad Nantwein or Nantwin(us); d. 7 August 1286) was, according to legend, a pious Christian pilgrim who died as a martyr. He is venerated as a saint and his feast day is 7 August.

== Life ==
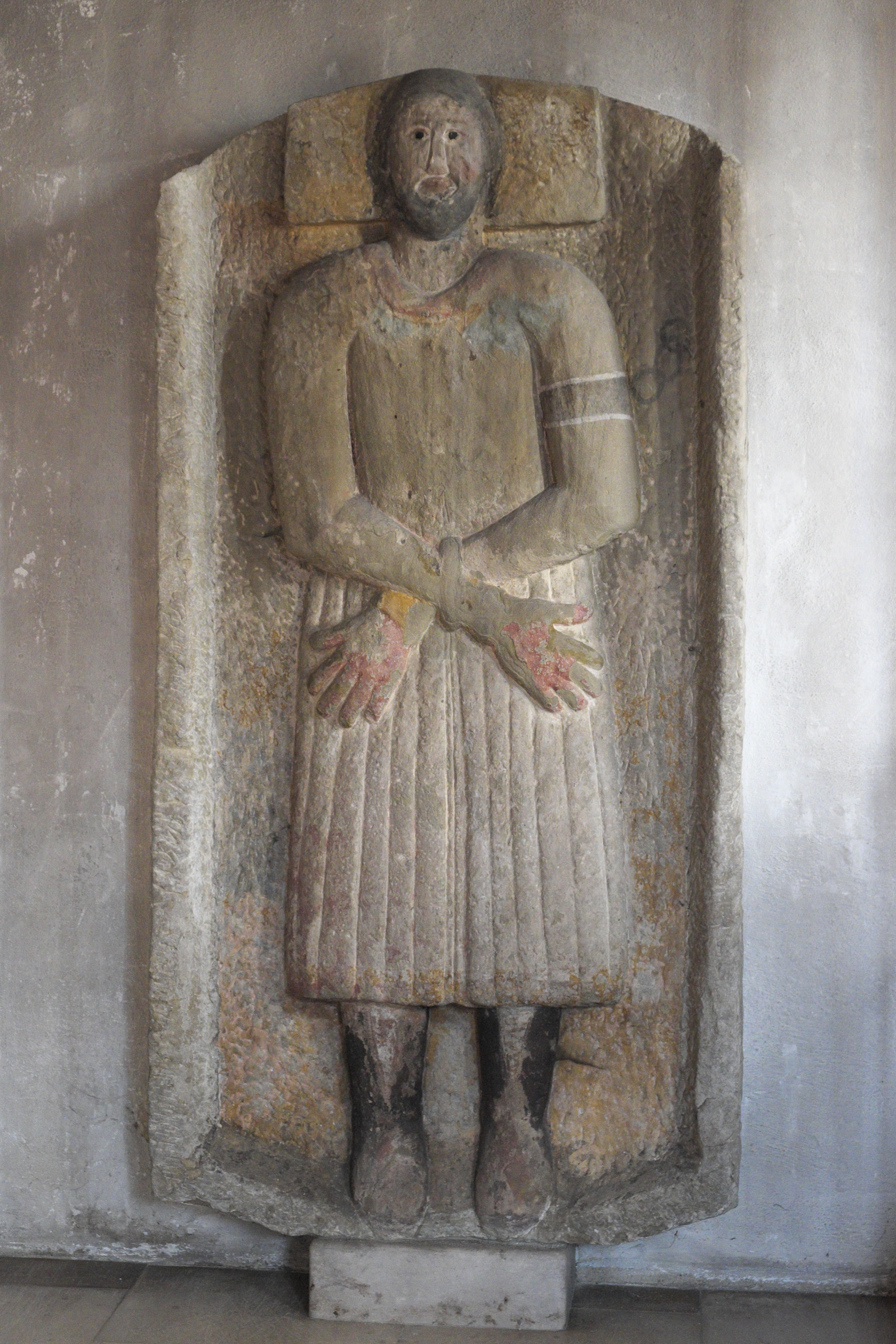
Late romanic sandstone relief of Nantovinus in St. Nantwein church

There is no record about Nantovinus' origin and occupation. According to tradition the saint came to Wolfratshausen on horseback in 1286 on a pilgrimage to Rome. As the incumbent judge Gantner learned that the pilgrim had supposedly seduced an underage boy, he had Nantovinus arrested and brought to Castle Wolfratshausen. Meanwhile the judge observed that Nantovinus travelled with a considerable sum of money. To obtain it, Gantner convicted him without questioning witnesses to burning at the stake. Stadler's Vollständiges Heiligen-Lexikon (complete lexicon of saints) from 1858 says that the judge wanted to get Nantovinus' beautiful horse.

According to legend the condemned was asked at what place he wanted to be burnt. Then he had taken off the top of his pilgrim's staff and thrown it over the river Loisach saying "Where this falls down shall be my place of execution". He is said to have indeed been burnt there. At this place the church St. Nantwein stands today.

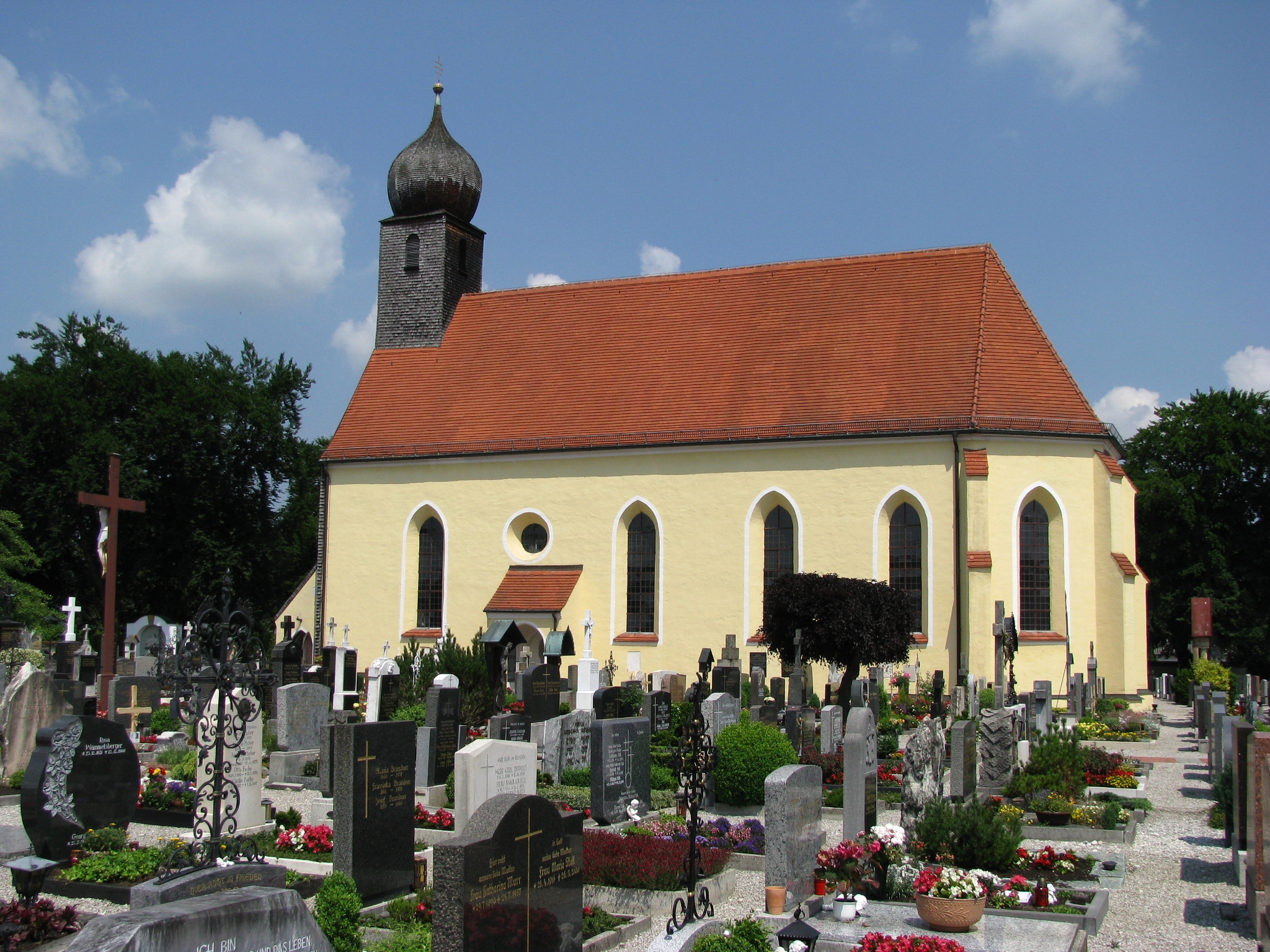
St. Nantwein church

From the place of martyrdom miracles were reported soon after. So exists a tradition that the blinded horse of judge Gantner could see again after a piece of bone from the ashes of the burnt martyr was held in front of its eyes. The remaining bones were kept in a chapel, raised in honour of the martyr only a few years later at the place of execution. The brain pan and pilgrim's bottle of the saint were also preserved. Pilgrims started pouring in because of the marvelous events, and pope Boniface VIII is said to have conducted the canonization of Nantovinus in 1297. In 1624 St. Nantwein church was built in the baroque style to accommodate the large number of visiting believers, which still stands at the spot today.

The relics, meanwhile lined in silver, had to be given over to the state in 1801 to contribute to the war chest. After several changes in ownership the brain pan got into the possession of a Munich citizen in 1928, who gave it to the Munich Stadtmuseum where it remains. The pilgrim's bottles are missing to this day, however.

The quarter of Wolfratshausen where the events took place derives its name Nantwein from the saint. Images of Nantovinus depict his death by burning or a pilgrim in bonds.
