= Displaced persons camps in post–World War II Europe =

Temporary refugee camps in Germany, Austria and Italy

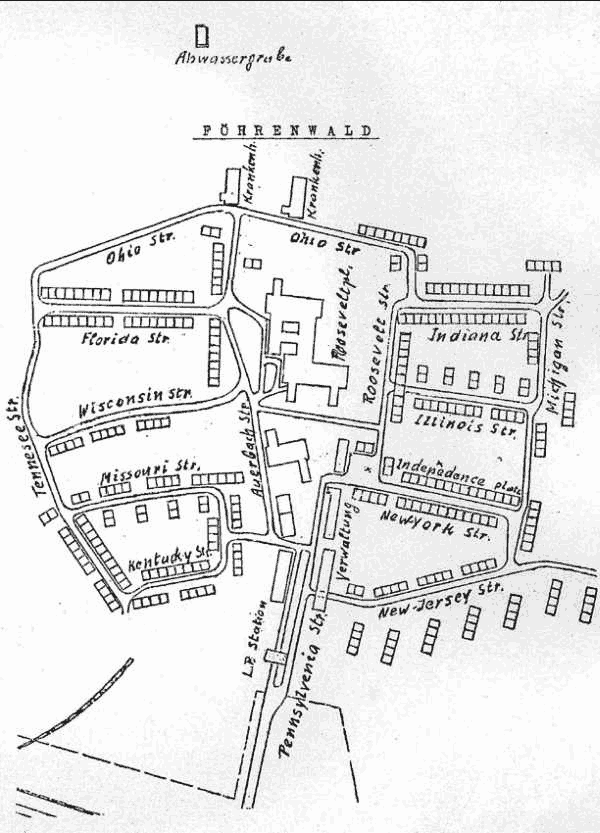
Plan of Föhrenwald DP camp in Bavaria

Displaced persons camps in post–World War II Europe were established in Germany, Austria, and Italy, primarily for refugees from Eastern Europe and for the former inmates of the Nazi German concentration camps. A "displaced persons camp" was a temporary facility for displaced persons, whether refugees or internally displaced persons. Two years after the end of World War II in Europe, some 850,000 people lived in displaced persons camps across Europe, among them Jews, Armenians, Czechoslovaks, Estonians, Germans, Greeks, Bulgarians, Poles, Latvians, Lithuanians, Yugoslavs, Russians, Ukrainians, Hungarians, Kalmyks, and Belarusians.

At the end of the Second World War, at least 40 million people had been displaced from their home countries, with about eleven million in Allied-occupied Germany. Among those, there were around 1.2 million people who refused to return to their countries of origin. These included former prisoners of war, released slave laborers, and both non-Jewish and Jewish concentration-camp survivors, though the majority tended to be Jewish. The Allies categorized the refugees as "displaced persons" (DPs) and assigned the responsibility for their care to the United Nations Relief and Rehabilitation Administration (UNRRA).

== Background ==
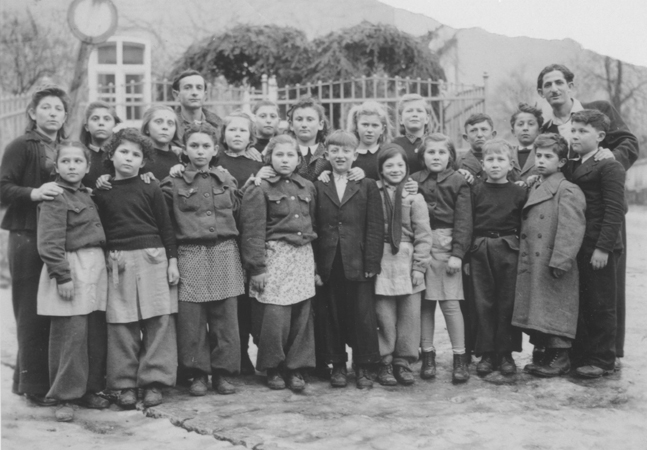
Class portrait of school children at Schauenstein DP camp, about 1946

Combat operations, ethnic cleansing, and the fear of genocide uprooted millions of people from their homes over the course of World War II. Between 40 million and 60 million people were displaced. A large number were inmates of Nazi concentration camps, labor camps and prisoner-of-war camps that were freed by the Allied armies. In portions of Eastern Europe, both civilians and military personnel fled their home countries in fear of advancing Soviet armies, who were preceded by widespread reports of mass rape, pillaging, looting, and murder.

As the war ended, these people found themselves facing an uncertain future. Allied military and civilian authorities faced considerable challenges resettling them. Since the reasons for displacement varied considerably, the Supreme Headquarters Allied Expeditionary Force classified individuals into a number of categories: evacuees, war or political refugees, political prisoners, forced or voluntary workers, Organisation Todt workers, former forces under German command, deportees, intruded persons, extruded persons, civilian internees, ex-prisoners of war, and stateless persons.

In addition, displaced persons came from every country that had been invaded or occupied by German forces. Although the situation of many of the DPs could be resolved by simply moving them to their original homes, this could not be done, for example, where borders changed to place the location in a new country. Additionally, many could not return home for fear of political persecution or retribution for perceived (or actual) collaboration with Axis powers.

== Establishing a system for resolving displacement ==
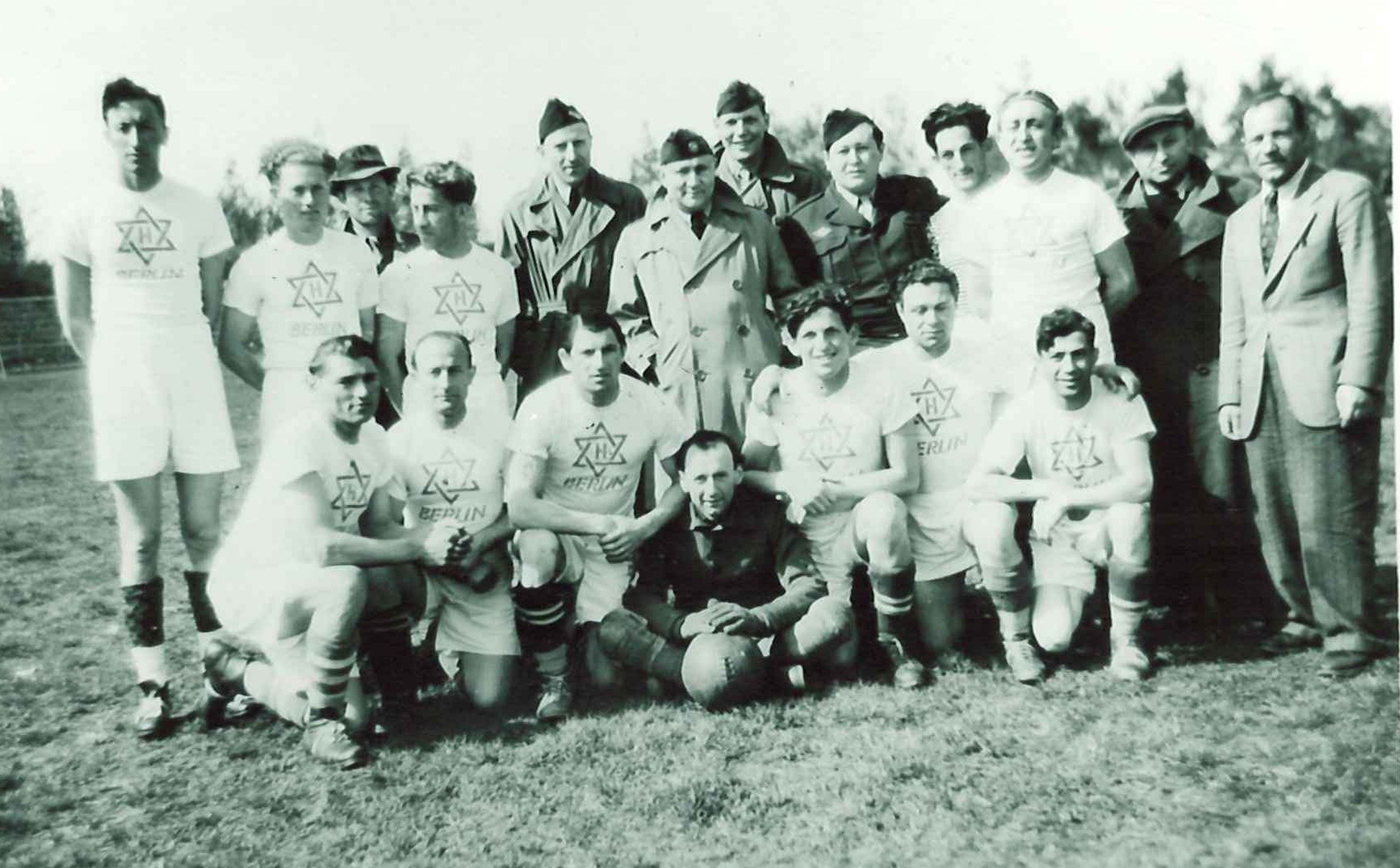
A DP Camp football team; Hirsch Schwartzberg, Berlin DP Camps Central Committee president, is second from right

The original plan for those displaced as a result of World War II was to repatriate them to their countries of origin as quickly as possible. Throughout Austria and Germany, American, French, British, or Soviet forces tended to the immediate needs of the refugees located within their particular Allied Occupation Zone and set in motion repatriation plans.

Nearly all of the displaced persons were malnourished, a great number were ill, and some were dying. Shelter was often improvised, and there were many instances of military personnel sharing from their own supplies of food, medicine, clothing, etc. to help the refugees.

Initially, military missions of the various Allied nations attached to the British, French and U.S. army commands assisted in the sorting and classifying the DPs of their own nationality. For example, during 1945 and 1946 there were several dozen Polish liaison officers attached to individual occupation army units. On October 1, 1945, the United Nations Relief and Rehabilitation Administration (UNRRA), which had already been running many of the camps, took responsibility for the administration of displaced persons in Europe, though military authorities continued to play a role for several years to come, in providing transportation, supplies and security.

Those who were easily classified and were willing to be repatriated were rapidly sent back to their country of origin. By the end of 1945, over six million refugees had been repatriated by the military forces and UNRRA. (The term displaced persons does not typically refer to the several million ethnic Germans in Europe (Poland, Czechoslovakia, the Netherlands etc.) who were expelled and repatriated in Germany.) British authorities made June 30, 1946 the cutoff for accepting further displaced persons in their sector of occupation, and the American sector set it at August 1, with the exception of those persecuted for race or religion, or who entered the zone in "an organized manner." The American sector ceased receiving new arrivals on April 21, 1947. An unknown number of displaced persons rejected by authorities were left to find their own means of survival.

== Camps ==
Displaced persons began to appear in substantial numbers in the spring of 1945. Allied forces took them into their care by improvising shelter wherever it could be found. Accommodation primarily included former military barracks, but also included summer camps for children, airports, hotels, castles, hospitals, private homes, and even partly destroyed structures. Although there were continuous efforts to sort and consolidate populations, there were hundreds of DP facilities in Germany, Austria, Italy, and other European countries by the end of 1945. One camp was even set up in Guanajuato in Mexico. Many American-run DP camps kept Holocaust survivors in horrific conditions, with insufficient food and inmates living under armed guard, as revealed in the Harrison Report.

The UNRRA moved quickly to field teams to take over administration of the camps from the military forces.

A number of DP camps became more or less permanent homes for these individuals. Conditions were varied and sometimes harsh. Rations were restricted, and curfews were frequently imposed. Camps were shut down as refugees found new homes and there was continuous consolidation of remaining refugees into fewer camps.

By 1952, all but two DP camps were closed. The last two DP camps, Föhrenwald closed in 1957 and Wels in 1959.

Displaced Persons Camps
Camp	Location	Population	Resident Groups	Date Closed
Föhrenwald	Near Munich, Germany	5000	Jews	February 1957
Isselheide	Germany, British zone	—	Latvians	—
Orlyk	Berchtesgaden, Germany	2000	Ukrainians	—
Wels	Germany	—	—	1959
Zeilsheim	Frankfurt, Germany, American Zone	—	Jews	November 15, 1948
Bergen-Belsen	Lower Saxony, Germany, British Zone	12,000	Jews, Poles	1950
Feldafing	Upper Bavaria, Germany, American Zone	4,000	Jews	1951
Landsberg	Bavaria, Germany, American Zone	6,000	Jews	1950
Poppendorf	Schleswig-Holstein, Germany, British Zone	4,000	Baltic refugees	1948
Santa Maria di Leuca	Puglia, Italy	—	Jews	1947
Trani	Bari, Italy	—	Jews	1947
Cinecittà	Rome, Italy	2,000	Jews	1948
Wegscheid	Linz, Austria	—	Jews, Poles	1950
Ebensee	Gmunden District, Austria	3,000	Jews	1947
Kufstein	Tyrol, Austria	—	Various	1949
Bad Ischl	Upper Austria	1,500	Jews	1949
St. Johann im Pongau UNRRA No. 18, formerly Stalag 18C POW camp	near Salzburg, Austria	30,000	Various	—
Rimini	Rimini, Italy	—	Yugoslavs, Jews	1948
Grumello	Lombardy, Italy	—	Various	1948
Enschede	Enschede, Netherlands	—	Jews	1947

== The needs of displaced persons ==
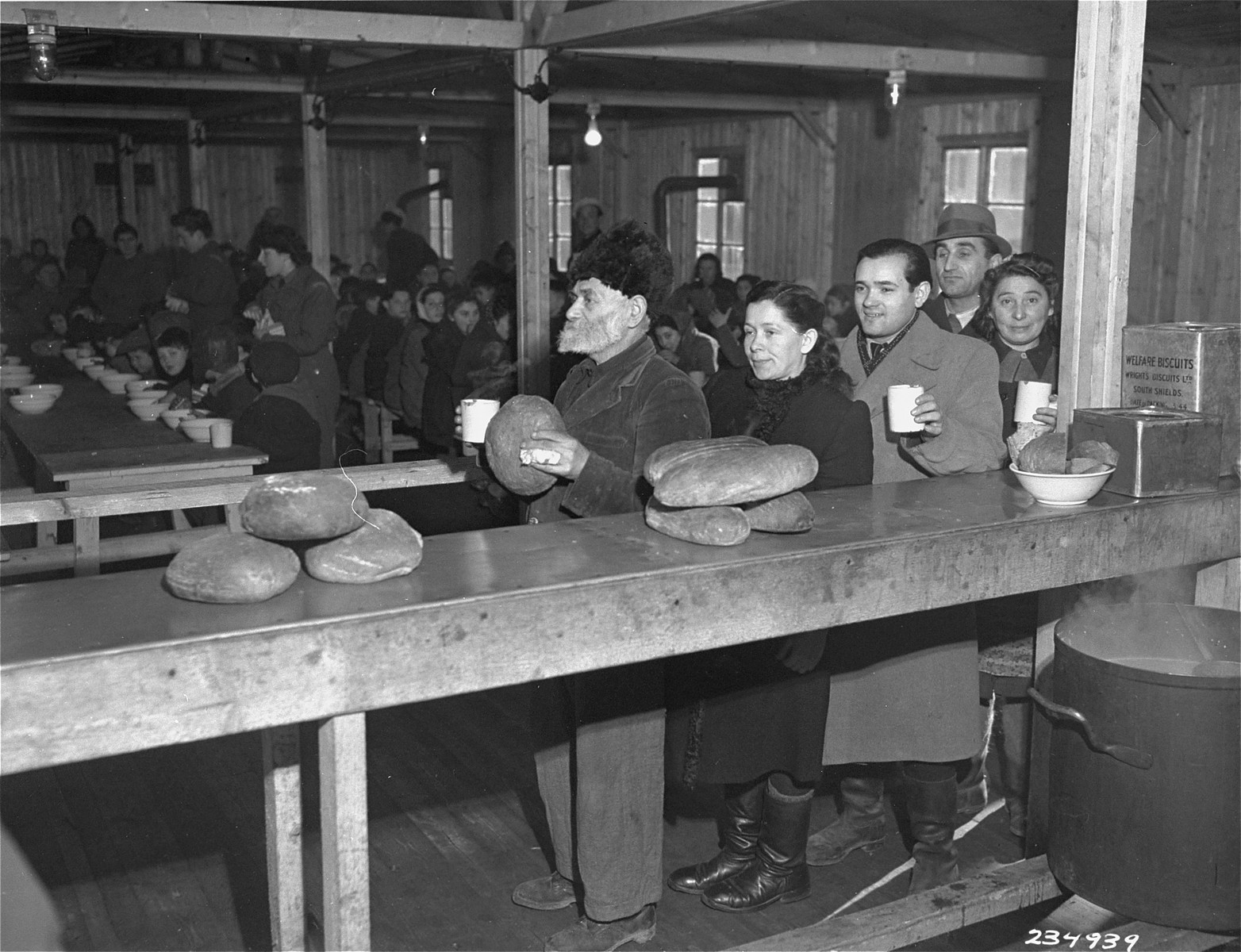
Jewish DPs at a camp in Linz after 1946

Many displaced persons had experienced trauma, and many had serious health conditions as a result of what they had endured.

The immediate concern was to provide shelter, nutrition and basic health care. Most DPs had subsisted on diets of far less than 1,500 calories a day. Sanitary conditions had been improvised at best, and there had been minimal medical care. As a result, they suffered from malnutrition, a variety of diseases, and were often unclean, lice-ridden, and prone to illness.

In addition, most of the refugees suffered from psychological difficulties. They were often distrustful and apprehensive around authorities, and many were depressed and traumatized. Menachem Z. Rosensaft, who was born in 1948 in Bergen-Belsen to Holocaust survivors, said in an interview that he believed, "the survivors' hardships after the war had often been overlooked because 'it doesn't neatly fit the story line that we won the war and liberated the camps.'"

Displaced persons were anxious to be reunited with families they had been separated from in the course of the war. Improvised efforts to identify survivors became formalized through the UNRRA's Central Tracking Bureau and facilities of the International Red Cross. The organization collected over one million names in the course of the DP era and eventually became the International Tracing Service.

Displaced persons often moved from camp to camp, looking for family, countrymen, or better food and accommodation. Over time, ethnic and religious groups concentrated in certain camps.

Camp residents quickly set up churches, synagogues, newspapers, sports events, schools, and even universities. Among these were the Technical University in Esslingen set up by the Polish Mission, the Free Ukrainian University, the Ukrainian Technical-Agricultural Institute of Prodebrady, the Baltic University and the short-lived UNRRA University. German universities were required to accept a quota of DP students.

The Allies were faced with the repatriation of displaced persons. The initial expectation of the Allies was that the prisoners of concentration camps would simply be sent back to their countries of origin, but in the aftermath of the war, this soon became impossible. In February 1945, near the end of the war, the heads of the Allied powers, U.S. President Franklin D. Roosevelt, British Prime Minister Winston Churchill, and Soviet Premier Joseph Stalin convened to decide matters relating to rebuilding Europe after the war, a meeting now referred to as the Yalta Conference. This meeting resulted in a series of decisions, but a specifically important decision made resulted in forced repatriation, where displaced persons were forced back to their countries of origin, and this use of force resulted in acts of antisemitic violence against the survivors of the war. Studies conducted years after the closure of these camps found that forced displacement has a direct link to "elevated risk for PTSD and somatoform symptoms and lowered health related quality of life". To overcome the disastrous nature of the Yalta Conference, Displaced Persons Camps were established, and quickly it was understood that the conditions in these camps were a result of the improvised manner of their establishment. Commissioned by the US government, Earl G. Harrison documented the conditions of these camps. The Harrison Report documents crowded living spaces, a lack of necessary medical supplies, "pathetic malnutrition" of concentration camp prisoners, and a general lack of proper care for displaced persons. Another revelation to come from this report was that Jewish refugees were forced to intermingle with others who had collaborated with the Nazis in the murder of Jews. The information detailed in this report resulted in President Truman appointing military advisors to oversee the camps and restore humanity and sanitation to them as well. Food rations were increased, and conditions soon improved.

A number of charitable organizations provided significant humanitarian relief and services among displaced persons - these include the American Jewish Joint Distribution Committee, American Friends Service Committee, Friends Relief Service, the Lutheran World Federation, Catholic Charities, several national Red Cross organizations, Polish American Congress and Ukrainian American Relief Committee.

== The difficulties of repatriation ==
Over one million refugees could not be repatriated to their original countries and were left homeless as a result of fear of persecution. These included:

- Ethnic or religious groups that were likely to be persecuted in their countries of origin. These included many Jews (see Sh'erit ha-Pletah), and others.
- Poles, Ukrainians, Belarusians and some Czechs - who feared persecution by the communist regimes installed in their home countries by the Soviet Army, in particular those from provinces (Galicia, West Belarus etc.) that had been recently incorporated into the Soviet Union.
- Estonians, Lithuanians and Latvians whose homelands had been invaded by the Soviet Union (1940) and remained occupied after the war.
- Croats, Serbs and Slovenes who feared persecution by the communist government set up by Josip Broz Tito.
- Citizens of Free City of Danzig, annexed by Poland (1945).
- In a portent of the Cold War, individuals who simply wanted to avoid living under a communist regime.

The agreement reached at the Yalta Conference required in principle that all citizens of the Allied powers be repatriated to their home country. The Soviet Union insisted that Soviet citizens in the American, British, and French sectors be repatriated to the Soviet Union. Many resisted this, whether because they had collaborated with Nazi Germany or because they did not wish to return.

American, British, and French military officials, as well as UNRRA officials, reluctantly complied with this directive, and a number of Soviet citizens were repatriated. Many of these met with the hardship they feared, including death and confinement in the Gulags. There were also cases of kidnapping and coercion to return these individuals. Many avoided such repatriation by misrepresenting their origins, fleeing, or simply resisting. Rejecting claimed Soviet sovereignty over the Baltic states, allied officials also refused to repatriate Lithuanian, Estonian, and Latvian refugees against their will.

Similarly, many refugees who were repatriated to Yugoslavia were subjected to summary executions and torture.

Many Poles, who later agreed to be repatriated, did in fact suffer arrest and some were executed, particularly those that had served in the Warsaw Uprising of 1944, or in the Polish Resistance against the Nazis.

Jewish Holocaust survivors typically could not return to their former homes because these no longer existed or had been expropriated by former neighbors; the few Eastern European Jews who returned often experienced renewed antisemitism. In 1945, most Jewish Holocaust survivors had little choice but to stay in the DP camps; most Jews who wanted to could not leave Europe because Britain had severely limited legal Jewish immigration to Palestine and illegal immigration was strongly curtailed. Jewish refugees hoping to reach other countries, including the United States, were also met with restrictions and quotas. Noting how scarce U.S. visas became for Jewish DPs, Eric Lichtblau writes, "Some Washington policy makers were actively opposed to the idea of taking in Holocaust survivors because of lingering anti-Semitism."

Many Hungarians in Austria, fearing communist repression or war crimes charges, were reluctant to be repatriated. Relief workers were resistant to pressuring the Hungarians, and invoked recent UN and government statements against forced repatriation.

== Resettlement of DPs ==
Once it became obvious that repatriation plans left many DPs who needed new homes, it took time for countries to commit to accepting refugees. Existing refugee quotas were completely inadequate, and by the fall of 1946, it was not clear whether the remaining DPs would ever find a home.

Between 1947 and 1953, the vast majority of the "non-repatriables" would find new homes around the world, particularly among these countries:

- Belgium was the first country to adopt a large-scale immigration program when it called for 20,000 coal mine workers from the DP ranks, bringing in a total of 22,000 DPs near the end of 1947. The program met with some controversy, as critics viewed it as a cynical ploy to get cheap labor.
- The United Kingdom accepted 86,000 DPs as European Voluntary Workers as part of various labor import programs, the largest being "Operation Westward Ho". These came in addition to 115,000 Polish army veterans who had joined the Polish Resettlement Corps and 12,000 former members of the Waffen SS Ukrainian Halychyna Division.
- Canada first accepted a number of refugees through Orders in Council and then implemented a bulk-labor program to accept qualified labor and a close-relatives plan, that ultimately took the form of a sponsorship plan. By the end of 1951, Canada had accepted 157,687 refugees.
- Australia had initially launched an immigration program targeting refugees of British stock, but expanded this in late 1947 to include other refugees. Australia accepted a total of 182,159 refugees, principally of Polish and Baltic origins.
- By the time Israel was established in 1948, as many as 50,000 refugees had entered the country legally or illegally. Completely opening its doors to all Jewish refugees regardless of age, work ability, health, etc., Israel accepted more than 652,000 refugees by 1950.
- France accepted 38,157 displaced persons.
- In Latin America, Venezuela accepted 17,000 DPs; Brazil 29,000; and Argentina 33,000.
- French Morocco accepted 1,500 immigrants; Iraq extended an invitation to ten unmarried medical doctors.
- Norway accepted about 492 Jewish refugees, largely based on their ability to perform manual labor. These were scattered throughout the country, and most left as soon as they could, primarily to Israel.
- The United States was late to accept displaced persons, which led to considerable activism for a change in policy. Earl G. Harrison, who had previously reported on conditions in the camps to President Harry S. Truman led the Citizens Committee on Displaced Persons that attracted dignitaries such as Eleanor Roosevelt, David Dubinsky, Marshall Field, A. Philip Randolph, and others. Meeting considerable opposition in the U.S. Congress with a bias against Central and Eastern European intellectuals and Jews, the American program was the most idealistic and expansive of the Allied programs but also the most notoriously bureaucratic.

After World War II ended in 1945, there were 7 to 11 million displaced people, or refugees, still living in Germany, Austria and Italy. To have some of these refugees come to the U.S., Truman asked Congress to enact legislation. Truman's administration, along with a lobbying group for refugees, Citizens Committee on Displaced Persons, favored allowing European refugees from World War II to enter the U.S. Truman signed the first Displaced Persons Act on June 25, 1948. It allowed 200,000 displaced persons to enter the country within the next two years. However, they exceeded the quota by extending the act for another two years, which doubled the admission of refugees into the United States to 415,000. From 1949 to 1952, about half the 900,000 immigrants that entered the United States were displaced persons. In order to qualify for American visas, only those that were in internment camps by the end of 1945 were eligible. The displaced persons that were trying to come to America had to have a sponsor and a place to live before their arrival, a guarantee that they would not displace American workers and, even more preferable, was that they had a relative that is an American citizen. Voluntary social service agencies, created by religious and ethnic groups, helped the refugees settle into American life. Of the DPs the US admitted from eastern Europe between 1941 and 1957, 137,450 were European Jews.

By 1953, over 250,000 refugees were still in Europe, most of them old, infirm, crippled, or otherwise disabled. Some European countries accepted these refugees on a humanitarian basis. Norway accepted 200 refugees who were blind or had tuberculosis, and Sweden also accepted a limited number. In the end most of them were accepted by Germany and Austria for their care and ultimately full resettlement as citizens.

Resettlement of refugees and Displaced Persons by number and destination (1 July 1947 – 31 December 1951)
Destination	Arrivals
United States	329,301
Australia	182,159
Israel	132,109
Canada	123,479
United Kingdom	86,346
France	38,445
Argentina	32,712
Brazil	28,848
Belgium	22,477
Venezuela	17,277
Paraguay	5,887
Chile	5,108
New Zealand	4,837
Netherlands	4,355
Sweden	4,330
Bolivia	2,485
Peru	2,340
Uruguay	1,461
French Morocco	1,446
Norway	1,105
All others	13,094
Total	1,039,601

== See also ==
- Refugee camp
- Scouting in displaced persons camps
- Internally displaced person
- Tent city
- The Truce
- Hirsch Schwartzberg
- Erinnerungsort Badehaus
- Internment of refugees in the Soviet Union during World War II
