= Föhrenwald =

Jewish displaced persons camp in Bavaria, Germany, 1945–1957

- Jewish displaced persons camp
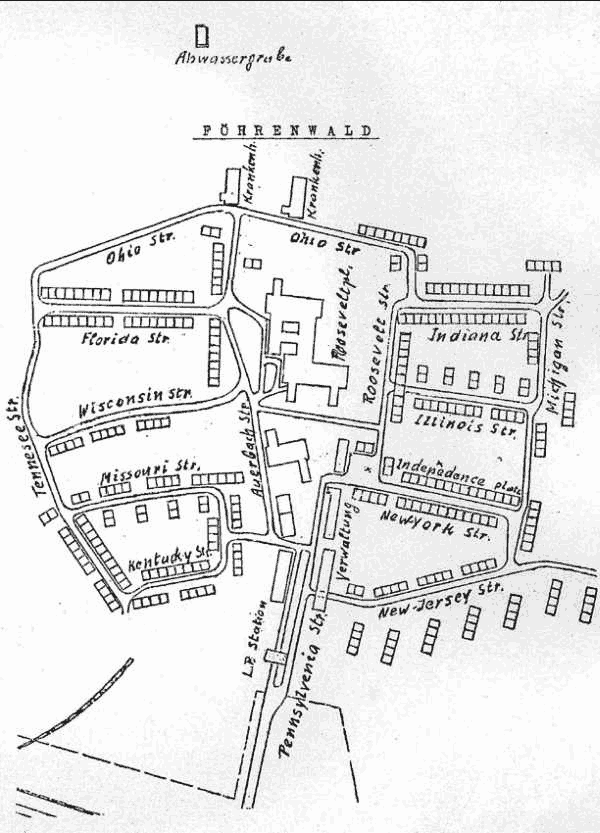
- United States Army map of Föhrenwald DP camp
- Interactive map of Föhrenwald
- Coordinates: 47.9003°N 11.4449°E
- Location: Waldram, Wolfratshausen, Bavaria, Germany
- Occupation zone: American occupation zone
- Previous use: Workers' settlement serving nearby armaments factories
- Established by: United States Army
- Opened: June 1945 as a DP camp
- Closed: 28 February 1957
- Administered by: UNRRA; IRO; Bavarian state government (from December 1951)
- Camp director: Henry Cohen (UNRRA)
- Resident leadership: Elected Föhrenwald camp committee
- Supporting organizations: American Jewish Joint Distribution Committee; HIAS; ORT
- Resident groups: Mixed international displaced persons (1945); Jewish displaced persons (from 3 October 1945)
- Population: 5,300; January 1946
- Functions: Residential accommodation and welfare; Resident self-government and municipal services; Education and vocational training; Religious and cultural life; Medical and tuberculosis care; Emigration and resettlement
- Subsequent use: Waldram residential settlement

Föhrenwald (German: [ˈføːʁənˌvalt]) was a major Jewish displaced persons camp in the American occupation zone in Germany, located in what is now the Waldram district of Wolfratshausen, Bavaria. It developed into one of the largest and most institutionally extensive Jewish DP communities in postwar Germany and remained in existence until 28 February 1957, making it the last Jewish DP camp in Germany to close.

The settlement had been built before the war as housing for workers employed by nearby armaments factories and was taken over by the United States Army after the defeat of Nazi Germany. It initially housed displaced persons of several nationalities but became an exclusively Jewish camp on 3 October 1945. Its population rose from about 3,000 in October 1945 to 4,938 in December and 5,300 in January 1946; at times during 1946 it exceeded 6,000.

Föhrenwald developed elected self-government, a camp court, schools, vocational training, synagogues and a yeshiva, a hospital, police and fire services, youth organizations, sports, theater, music and a Yiddish newspaper. After large-scale emigration began following the establishment of Israel in 1948, Föhrenwald increasingly received residents transferred from closing camps and people who faced medical, family or legal barriers to resettlement. Some former emigrants also returned from Israel and other destinations. German authorities assumed formal administration on 1 December 1951, but Jewish institutions and international relief and resettlement work continued while the camp underwent a prolonged process of liquidation.

== Site and establishment ==
The Föhrenwald settlement was built in 1939–1940 on an area of approximately 52 hectares near Wolfratshausen. It contained about 300 residential buildings intended principally for workers employed at armaments plants in the area. The development was associated with IG Farben, and parts of the larger wartime complex were also used to accommodate forced laborers.

United States forces took control of the settlement in May 1945. By June it was functioning as a displaced-persons camp. Early residents included survivors of concentration camps and death marches, former forced laborers and other displaced people. The camp initially accommodated a mixed population that included Jewish, Yugoslav, Hungarian and Baltic DPs.

Following criticism of conditions in camps where Jewish survivors were housed together with non-Jewish displaced persons, the American occupation authorities began concentrating Jewish DPs in separate camps. After General Dwight D. Eisenhower inspected the Feldafing DP camp in September 1945, Föhrenwald was designated an exclusively Jewish camp on 3 October. About 3,000 Jewish DPs were living there that month. The population increased rapidly, reaching 4,938 in December 1945 and 5,300 in January 1946.

Compared with many improvised DP installations, Föhrenwald had substantial permanent housing. The settlement's individual houses and existing infrastructure facilitated the development of a comparatively stable residential community rather than a purely temporary assembly center.

== Community and institutions ==
=== Administration and self-government ===
The camp was administered initially under the authority of the United States Army and UNRRA. UNRRA subsequently assumed day-to-day internal administration, while the American military government retained ultimate occupation authority. After UNRRA's withdrawal, the IRO assumed responsibility for many administrative, protection and resettlement functions.

Henry Cohen, an American army veteran working for UNRRA, served as camp director during an important period of Föhrenwald's institutional development. An elected Jewish camp committee represented the residents and supervised substantial areas of internal life, including education and municipal services. The community maintained its own camp police and fire service as well as disciplinary and postal functions.

Föhrenwald also maintained a resident court, part of the wider system of Jewish camp courts that developed in the American occupation zone. These courts handled civil disputes, disciplinary cases and allegations of collaboration, but their use of imprisonment and fines raised questions about the division of authority between Jewish self-government and the American military government.

The dispute became particularly acute at Föhrenwald in 1946. The camp court convicted Salomon Schulsinger, who was accused of having served as a kapo, and sentenced him to six months in the camp prison. The United States Army subsequently opened an extensive investigation of the Föhrenwald court and concluded that it had exercised jurisdiction reserved to the military government. The case became one of the principal episodes in negotiations over the legal status and powers of Jewish DP camp courts.

=== Education, religion and cultural life ===
Föhrenwald developed an extensive educational system. It had a kindergarten, an elementary school and religious instruction, with teaching in Yiddish and Hebrew. ORT operated vocational programs intended to give residents skills that could be used after emigration or resettlement.

Religious institutions were especially prominent. The camp contained synagogues and prayer rooms, a mikveh, and a yeshiva that enrolled approximately 150 students and also served as an important center of Orthodox Jewish learning in the American occupation zone. Rabbi Yekusiel Yehudah Halberstam, the Klausenburger Rebbe and later founder of the Klausenburg Hasidic dynasty, lived among survivors at Föhrenwald and emerged as an important religious leader there. The concentration of Orthodox institutions and residents made Föhrenwald an important center of Hasidic and Orthodox Jewish life among the DPs.

The camp also had an active secular cultural life. Residents organized theatrical and musical performances, literary activities, cinema screenings and sports. The camp newspaper, Bamidbar ("In the wilderness", the Hebrew title of the Book of Numbers), reported on political, cultural and communal affairs and carried notices concerning missing relatives. In September 1947 its editors issued a roughly 100-page almanac documenting camp life.

Commercial and social activity developed alongside the formal institutions. Shops operated within the settlement, and a Sunday market attracted residents and people from the surrounding area.

=== Health and welfare ===
Föhrenwald maintained a camp hospital providing general and specialized medical care. A serious tuberculosis outbreak in the summer of 1946 produced 382 recorded cases. In response, patients formed the Committee of Jewish Tubercular Patients, which became both a representative organization and an advocate for access to medical treatment and resettlement.

Tuberculosis and other chronic illnesses became increasingly important to Föhrenwald's later history. Medical conditions could make residents ineligible for immigration under the rules of prospective destination countries, leaving some patients in the camp long after healthier residents had emigrated. The tuberculosis committee continued to represent patients during the 1950s and remained active during the camp's liquidation.

=== Zionism and emigration ===
Zionist political and youth organizations were prominent in Föhrenwald. Residents organized demonstrations against British restrictions on Jewish immigration to Mandatory Palestine and participated in protests connected with the fate of the passengers of the Exodus 1947.

Youth movements established communal training groups or hachshara collectives to prepare participants for emigration and agricultural life in Palestine. Föhrenwald residents also used the nearby Hochland training site at Königsdorf, associated with the Haganah, for agricultural and physical preparation.

Some residents attempted to reach Palestine through unauthorized immigration before the establishment of Israel. After Israel was established in May 1948, emigration increased sharply. Other residents left for the United States, Canada and additional countries as immigration restrictions eased.

== From mass emigration to a residual community ==
The rapid departures after 1948 initially led occupation and relief authorities to expect Föhrenwald to close by the end of 1949. That closure did not occur. As other DP camps were dissolved, some of their remaining residents were transferred to Föhrenwald. The camp therefore became increasingly important as a concentration point for people who had not been able to emigrate because of illness, age, family circumstances, immigration restrictions or other barriers.

Population decline consequently did not follow a simple progression toward closure. Föhrenwald received new arrivals even while large numbers of earlier residents were leaving. Some Jewish emigrants who had gone to Israel or other countries returned to Germany during the early 1950s, sometimes hoping to obtain visas for onward migration to the United States, Canada or elsewhere. These transfers and return migrations could temporarily increase the population despite continuing emigration.

By the beginning of the 1950s, Föhrenwald had thus changed from a large community oriented principally toward future emigration into a camp with a disproportionate number of residents requiring long-term medical, welfare, family or resettlement assistance. Its hospital, tuberculosis committee, Orthodox institutions and resident representatives remained important precisely because many of those who remained faced more difficult resettlement circumstances.

== German administration ==
On 1 December 1951 formal administration of Föhrenwald passed from international authorities to the Bavarian government. Under German administration, the installation was treated as a government camp for heimatlose Ausländer ("homeless foreigners"). The transfer did not end the Jewish community or its institutions. The elected camp committee continued to represent residents, while the American Jewish Joint Distribution Committee and other Jewish and international organizations remained involved in welfare, medical care, emigration and resettlement.

Relations between residents and the German authorities were at times tense. In May 1952 German customs and state police entered the camp in an operation directed against allegedly undeclared or black-market goods. Residents resisted the search, a shot was fired, and the police eventually withdrew. The confrontation further damaged relations between the Jewish residents and the new German administration.

German authorities increasingly sought to dissolve the camp and transfer responsibility for residents to ordinary welfare, housing and medical institutions. For many residents, however, closure raised questions extending beyond housing alone. Patients needed continuing treatment, Orthodox residents sought access to religious institutions and kosher food, families sought suitable accommodation, and some residents continued to pursue emigration rather than permanent settlement in Germany.

== Liquidation and closure ==
By 1954 the liquidation of Föhrenwald had become a central issue in camp politics. Residents formed an Action Committee that opposed aspects of the proposed closure and represented residents in negotiations with German and Jewish organizations. Other bodies, including the tuberculosis committee, Orthodox representatives and parents' representatives, advocated for particular groups whose needs could not easily be met by simple dispersal from the camp.

Medical resettlement was a major obstacle. International and Jewish agencies sought countries willing to accept residents with tuberculosis or other chronic illnesses. Norway agreed to receive a group of tuberculosis patients together with family members, while other patients were placed in hospitals and institutions in Germany and elsewhere.

The proposed closure of Föhrenwald's hospital in 1955 produced further resistance. Archival records of the JDC describe protests, including a hunger strike, while arrangements were negotiated for the transfer of sick and disabled residents to other institutions. The hospital closed after its remaining patients had been assigned to other facilities.

For residents who were unlikely to emigrate, German authorities and Jewish welfare organizations increasingly pursued integration through permanent housing. Accommodation was arranged for several hundred former Föhrenwald residents, particularly in Munich and Frankfurt, while others continued to emigrate or entered medical and welfare institutions.

At the same time, the physical settlement itself was being transferred to a new population. In 1955 the Katholisches Siedlungswerk, a Catholic housing organization, acquired the site. Renovation began, and from 1956 German Catholic expellee families from Eastern Europe began moving into houses in the settlement while the final Jewish residents were still being relocated.

The last Jewish residents left Föhrenwald on '28 February 1957. A contemporary report distributed by the Jewish Telegraphic Agency identified Alter Haimovitz, his wife and their two children as the last family to leave the camp. Föhrenwald was the final Jewish DP camp in Germany to close.

The settlement remained inhabited after the Jewish camp ended. On 7 November 1957 it was officially renamed Waldram. Waldram later became a district of Wolfratshausen.

== Commemoration ==
One of the surviving buildings associated with Föhrenwald's Jewish community was the former bathhouse and mikveh. When the building was threatened with demolition in 2012, local residents formed an association to preserve it and document the histories of the successive communities that had occupied the settlement.

The restored building opened in 2018 as the Erinnerungsort BADEHAUS. The museum presents the history of the wartime workers' settlement, the Jewish DP camp, the post-1957 Waldram community and later local memory.

== In literature ==
The Yiddish poet and playwright H. Leivick visited Jewish displaced-persons communities in postwar Europe. His experiences contributed to the 1949 dramatic work Di khasene in Fernvald ("The Wedding in Föhrenwald"), which used a wedding in the camp as the setting for a literary treatment of survivors attempting to rebuild their lives after the Holocaust.

== See also ==
- Sh'erit ha-Pletah
- Displaced persons camps in post–World War II Europe
- Feldafing DP camp
- Aliyah Bet
