= Erinnerungsort Badehaus – Badehaus museum =

Place of remembrance of camp for displaced persons

Erinnerungsort Badehaus
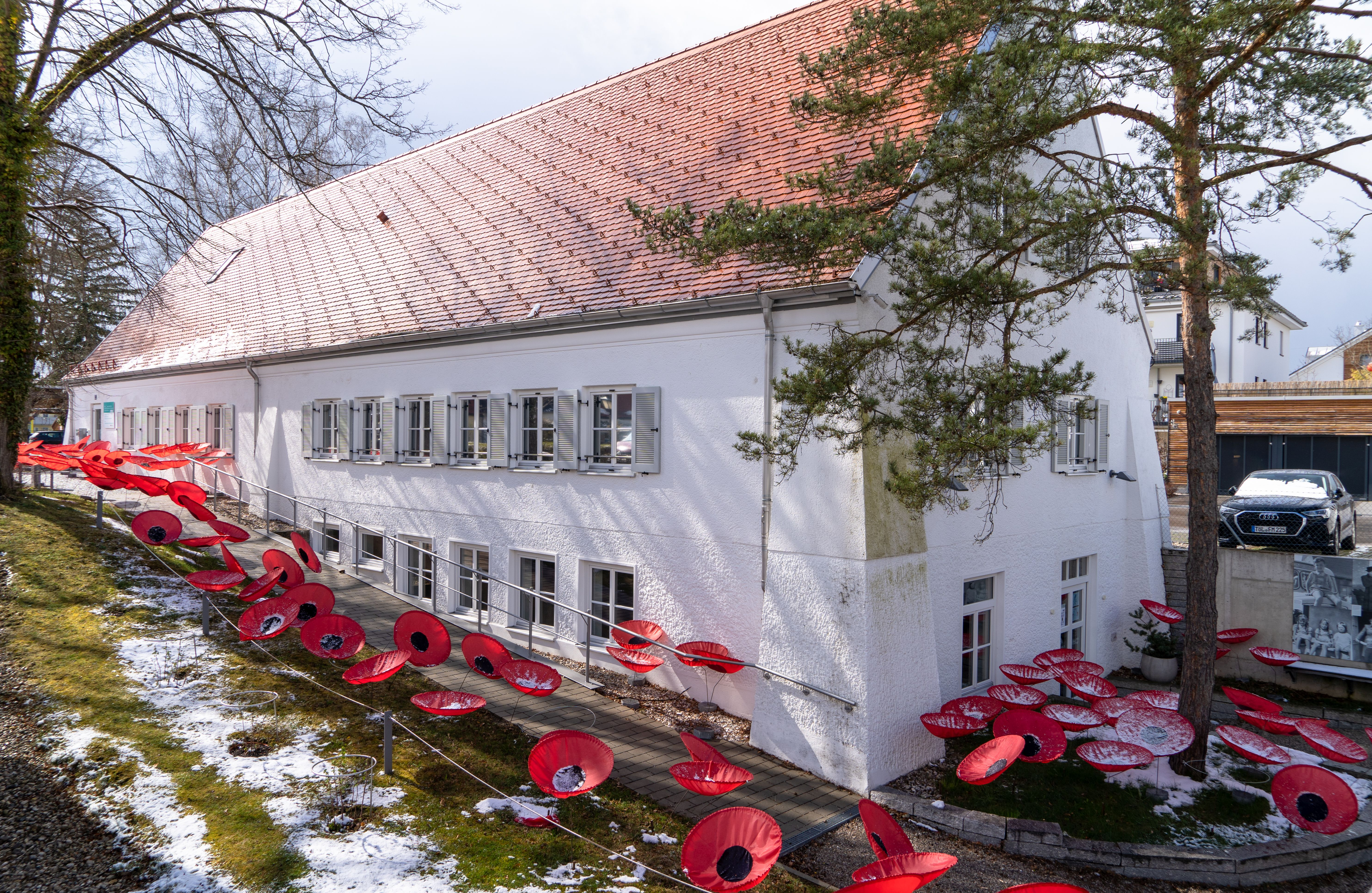
- Building Badehaus museum – Erinnerungsort Badehaus
- Established: in 1940 as a bath for men, in October 2018 as a museum
- Location: Kolpingplatz 1; 82515 Wolfratshausen-Waldram; Germany
- Coordinates: 47°53′57.7″N 11°26′39.5″E
- Type: Contemporary Historical Museum; Place of encounters; Place of learning
- Visitors: approx. 4,000 annually with approx. 250 guided tours annually
- Chairperson: Sybille Krafft
- Curator: Association "Bürger fürs Badehaus Waldram-Föhrenwald e.V.", run by people working on an honorary basis
- Architect: Lothar Schwaiger (1938), refurbishment in 2016: Klaus-Peter Scharf
- Website: BADEHAUS museum

International Standard Identifier for Libraries and Related Organizations (ISIL) DE-MUS-145524

The Erinnerungsort Badehaus (own spelling "BADEHAUS") is a historical museum situated at Kolpingplatz in Waldram, a district of the town of Wolfratshausen, approx. 30 km south of Munich (Germany). Documents of the settlement's history since its foundation in 1939 are exhibited in the museum. It is an extracurricular place of learning and a place of encounters for various generations, nations and religions. The association Bürger fürs Badehaus Waldram-Föhrenwald e.V. is owner and operator of the museum. It saved the building from demolition, had it refurbished and developed the concept for it to be turned into a museum. All the activities of people are and have been on an honorary basis. In 2022 the museum received the Obermayer-Award for its outstanding engagement in saving the Jewish history and for its ongoing fight against current prejudices.

== Building history ==
In 1939 a sanitation building was constructed for the male population of the Föhrenwald camp, as the modest houses where the workers of the nearby ammunition factory lived, had no bath tubs or showers. After the Second World War, when the camp Föhrenwald was used for displaced persons, it became the central sanitation facility for all the inhabitants. It was used on alternate days by men and women. From October 1945 onwards, by order of the American Military Administration, the camp was inhabited exclusively by Jews who had survived the National Socialist regime. In addition, initiated by the Rabbi Yekusiel Yehudah Halberstam, a mikveh, a Jewish ritual bath, was set-up in the cellar of the building. (Note: During the research of the history of the building, craftmens' invoices were found showing the costs for building a kosher bath at Independence Place at the Föhrenwald camp. They are kept in the Badehaus museum's archives.) This was documented no later than early March 1946.

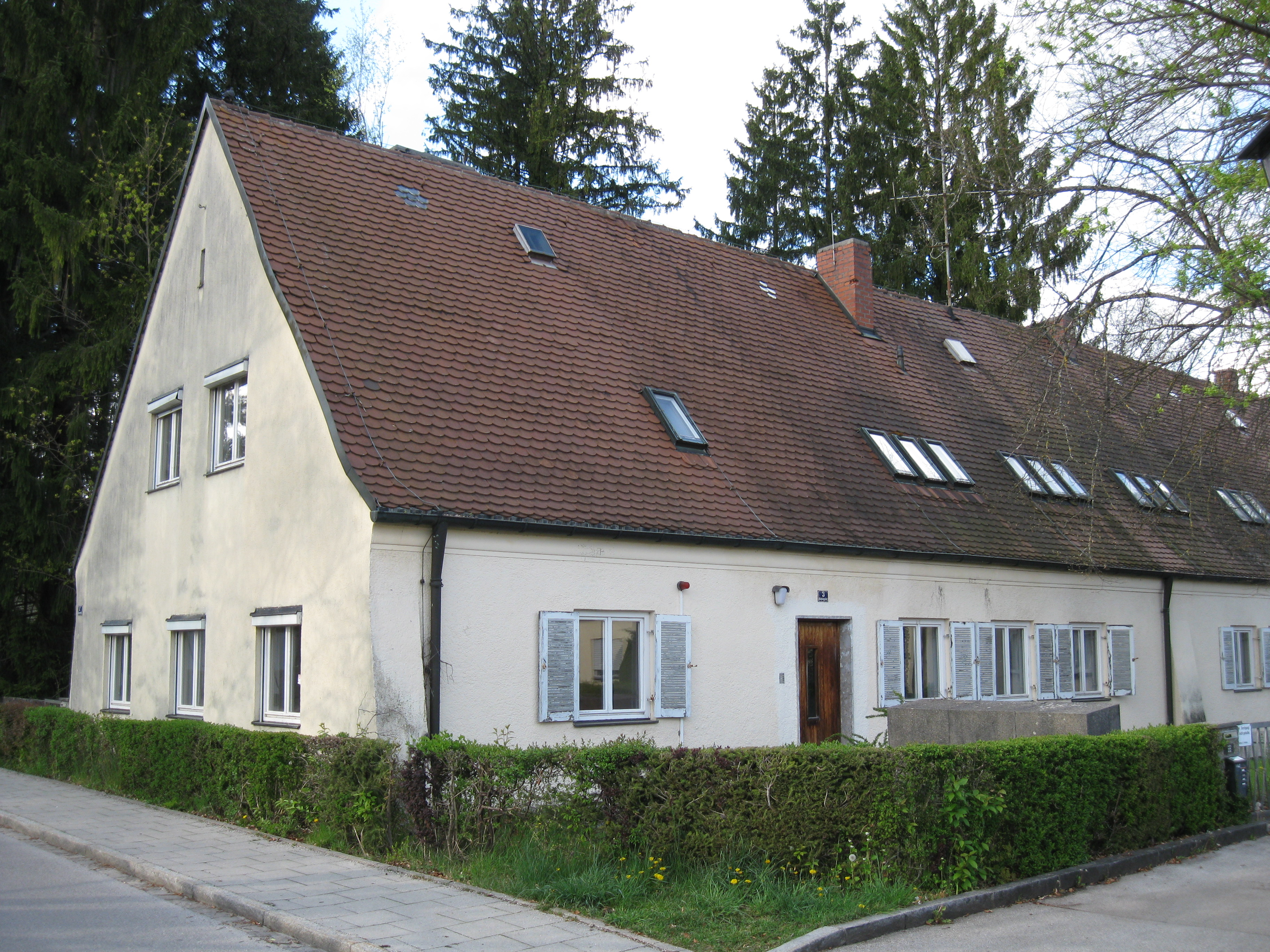
The Badehaus in the former camp Föhrenwald before it was refurbished and turned into a museum

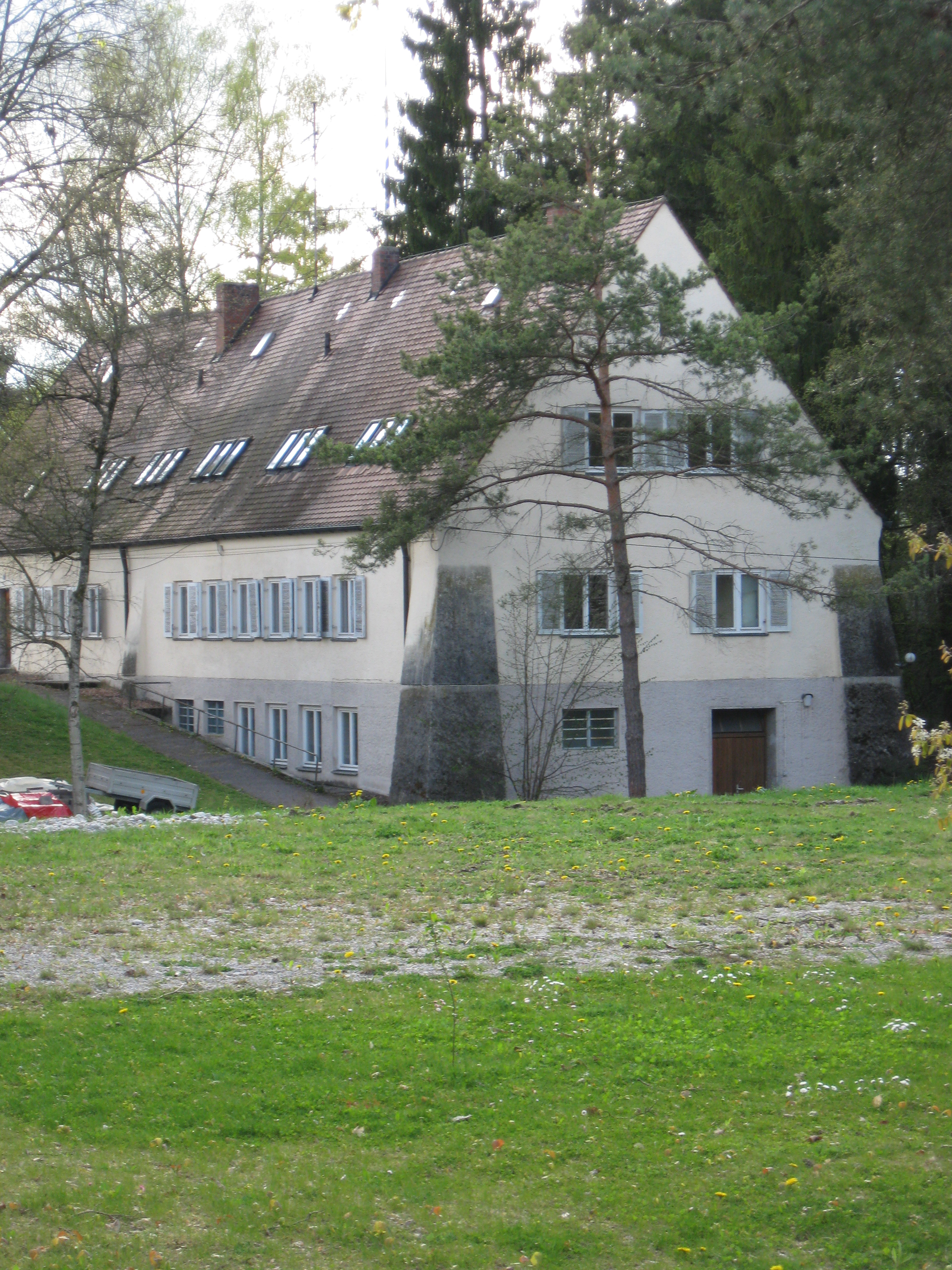
The Badehaus in the former camp Föhrenwald before it was refurbished and turned into a museum, hillside view

When the catholic nonprofit association Siedlungswerk took over the whole area in 1955, all houses were refurbished and bathrooms were installed. Thus the function of the Badehaus as sanitary building became obsolete. The new owners demolished the mikveh basin and installed a heating-system in the cellar. The consequence of this take-over was that the Jewish displaced persons had to leave the camp, successively, and the whole area was renamed into Waldram.

In 1963 the ground-floor of the building was converted into flats for teachers (Note: Maria Mannes, the former district guardian of cultural heritage, found building plans (drawings) during her research for converting the facility into a museum.) and in the attic rooms for the pupils of the catholic school Spätberufenenseminar St. Matthias were installed. The seminar complex itself had been built in September 1957 in the immediate neighbourhood of the former sanitation facility. The members of the Spätberufenenseminar St. Matthias called it "Badebau", a name which became popular in Waldram.

In 2011 the last inhabitants left the building. The financial department of the arch diocese planned to demolish the building and have blocks of flats erected on the site. However, an initiative of local citizens prevented this, their fear was that the characteristic appearance of the Kolpingplatz would be destroyed.

In September 2012 The association Bürger fürs Badehaus Waldram-Föhrenwald e.V, headed by historian and journalist Sybille Krafft, was founded. Members of the association Historischer Verein Wolfratshausen e.V. and of the association Siedlungsgemeinschaft Waldram e.V. formed an alliance in an attempt to save the historical building from demolition and to create a place of encounters and documentation. Documentation of the history of Waldram and Föhrenwald was compiled to be shown to the public in a multimedia-based presentation. The project received prominent support from Max Mannheimer (1920–2016) who, as a survivor of the Holocaust, had a special relationship with Föhrenwald. In Föhrenwald and other camps, after the war, he had taken care of Jewish displaced persons, who were traumatised through experiences during the Nazi regime. He became the first member of the association in 2012.

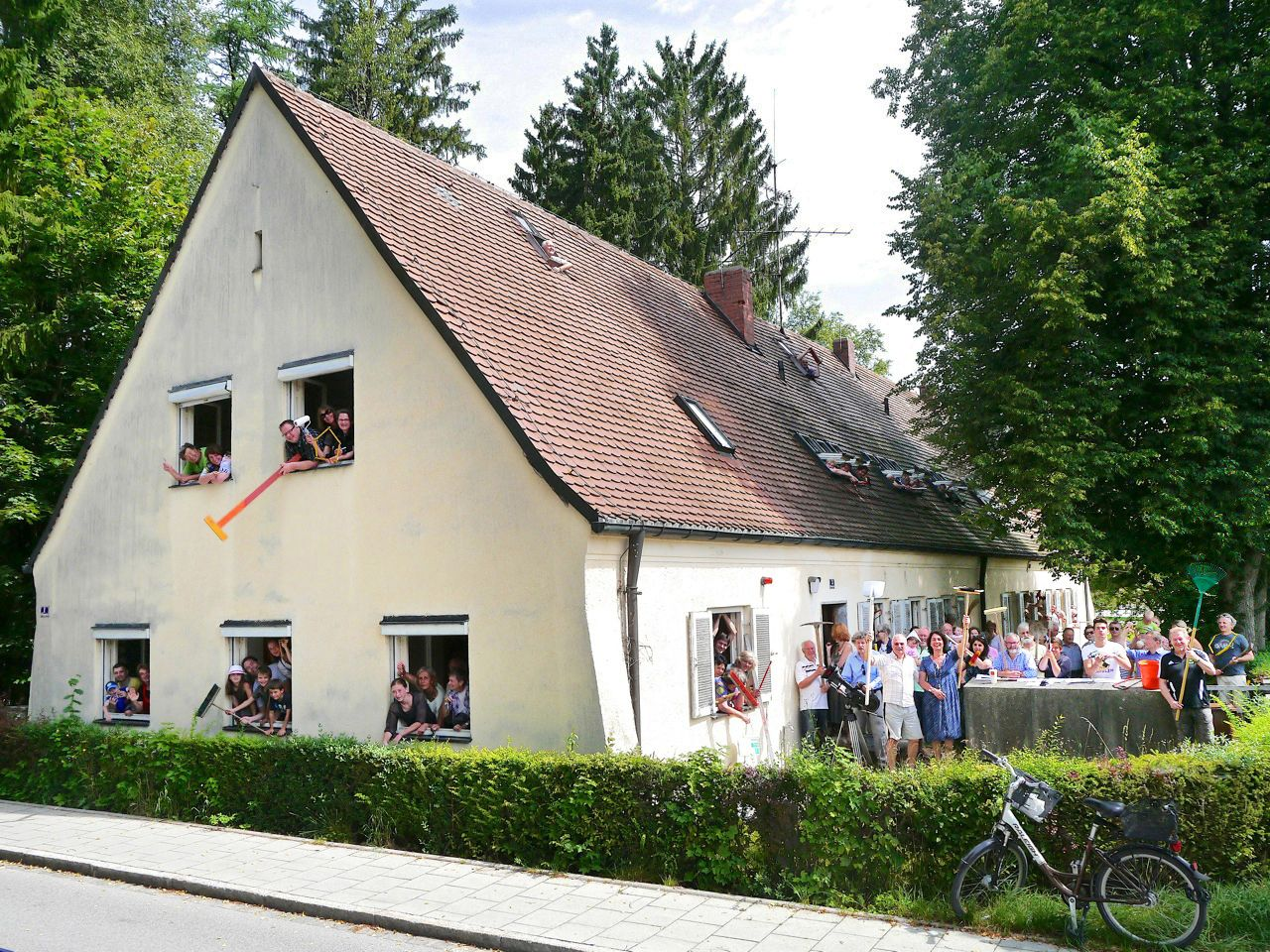
The "Ramadama" (=cleaning-up activity) was the beginning of the reorganising of the former camp Föhrenwald building into the Badehaus museum in 2012.

In 2015 the foundation Seminarstiftung St. Matthias gave the building to the association on condition that it be turned into a memorial site. In more than 20,000 honorary working hours, also with professional assistance and with the financial support from the municipality of Wolfratshausen, the district administration of Bad Tölz-Wolfratshausen, the Bavarian government and the European Union, it was possible to refurbish the building and to create the museum.

On 21 October 2018 the Badehaus museum was opened as a museum. It became a place against forgetting, visited by the locals, guests from all over the world, contemporary witnesses and their descendants. The 7000th visitor of the museum was welcomed in early April 2021. Already on 22 July 2022 the 10.000th visitor was welcomed.

== Museum concept ==
The concept of the memorial site rests on several pillars and has been realised multi-medially by a scientifically and pedagogically trained team.

- Museum with a permanent exhibition
- Guided museum tours for individuals and groups, also through Waldram and the ruins of the armament factories in the former so-called Wolfratshauser Forst.
- Museum app with audio guides and outdoor guided tours
- Series of events: Encounters at the BADEHAUS
- Series of events: Artistic interventions
- Special exhibitions
- Interviews with contemporary witnesses
- Touring exhibitions, which can be hired
- Special projects

=== Building layout ===
The space of the museum of 900 m^{2} is spread over three storeys, providing documents, photographs, films and exhibits as well as interviews with contemporary witnesses.

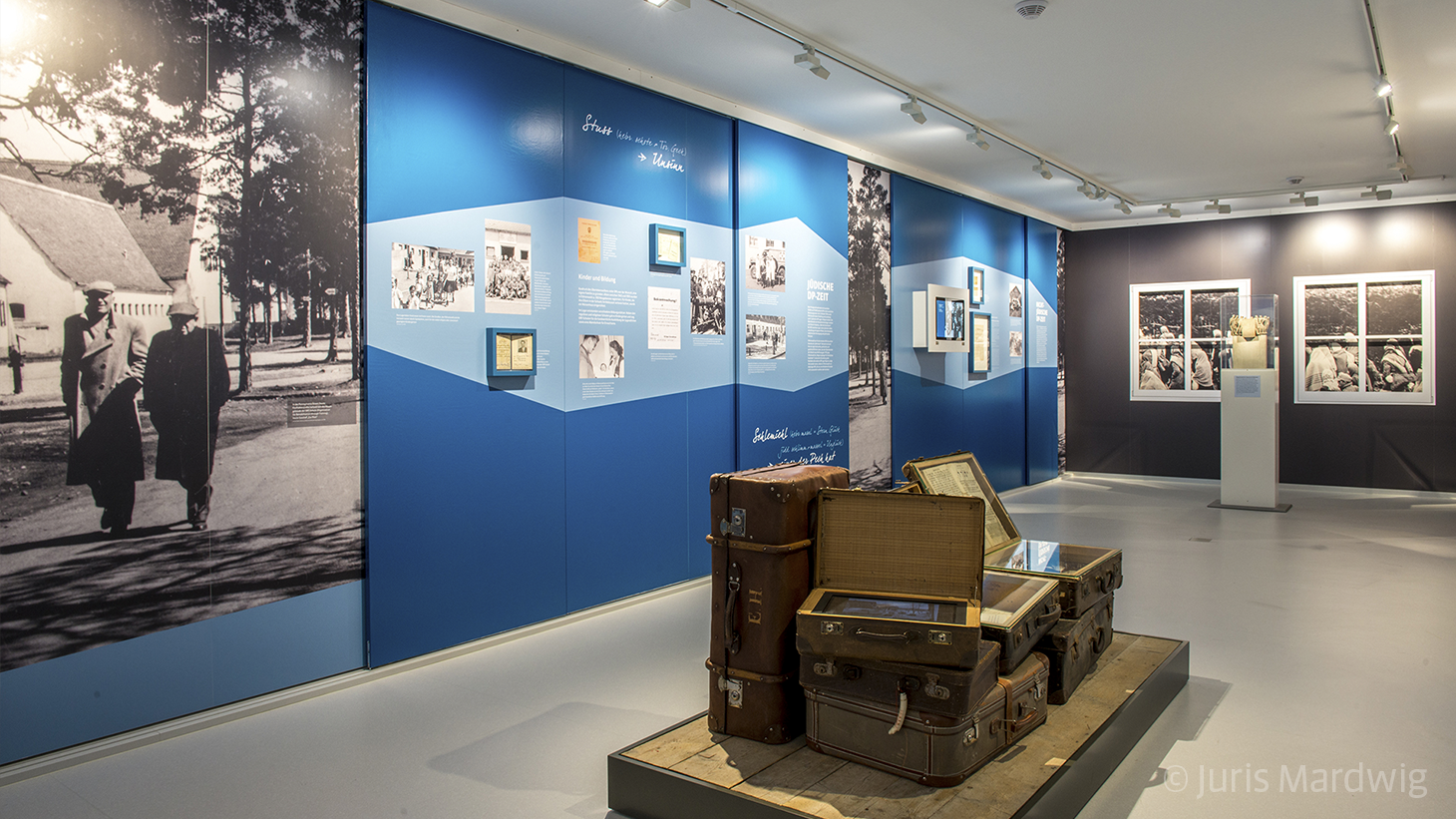
Badehaus museum – history of the displaced persons

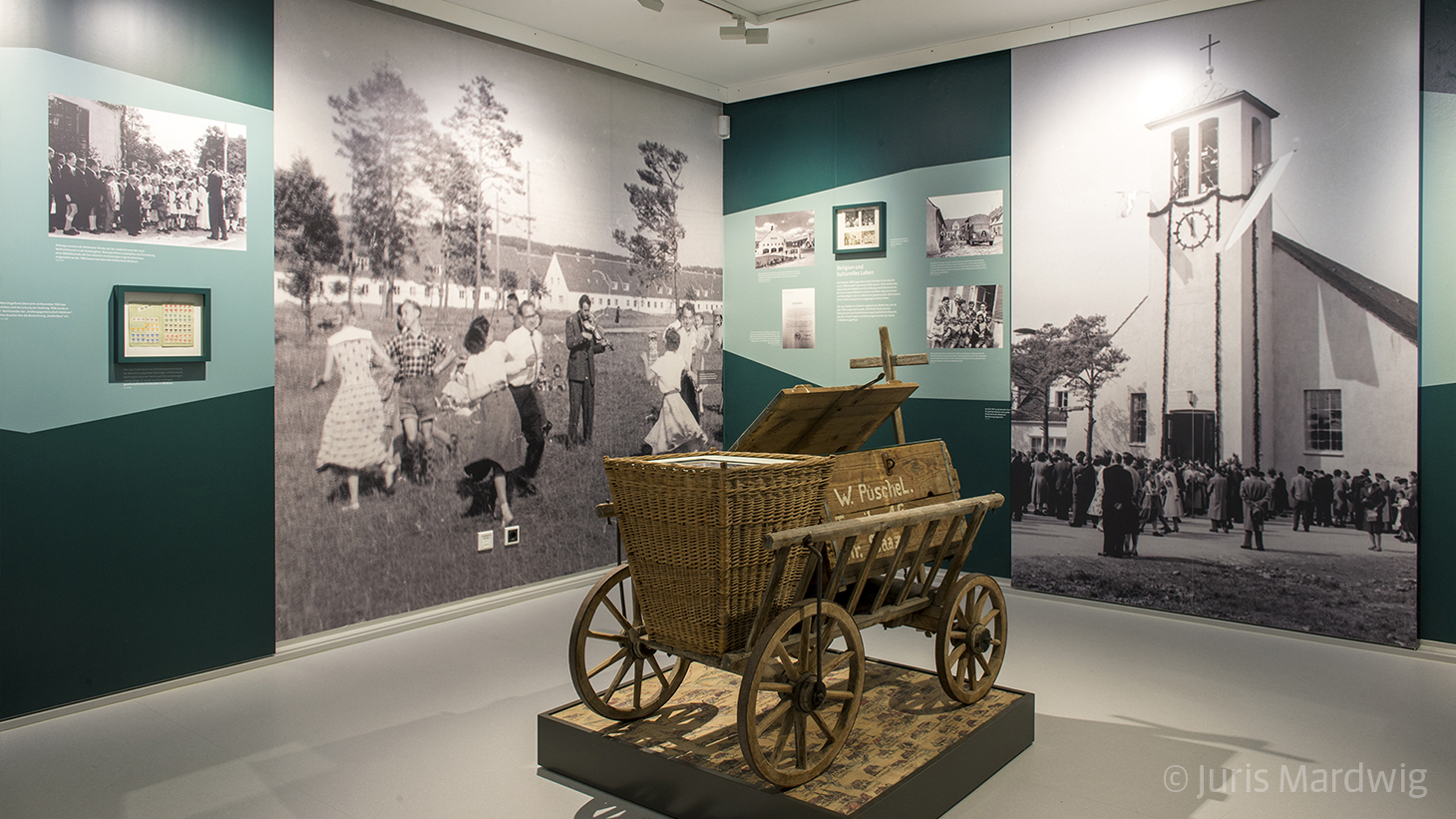
Badehaus museum – history of the expellees and refugees

==== Ground floor ====
A permanent multimedia-based exhibition shows the local and the migration history in European dimensions at the time of the National Socialism and at the post-war period in Germany after 1945. Each phase shows the local history of Föhrenwald and Waldram with examples in a cross-locational context: the beginning as a Nazi model settlement for the armes workers in 1939; the temporary use for survivors of the concentration camp prisoners' death march in 1945; the transformation into a camp for Jewish displaced persons in mid-1945; again a transformation into a settlement for refugees and expellees from Eastern European countries in 1956; and finally the development into the suburban living quarters of Waldram nowadays.

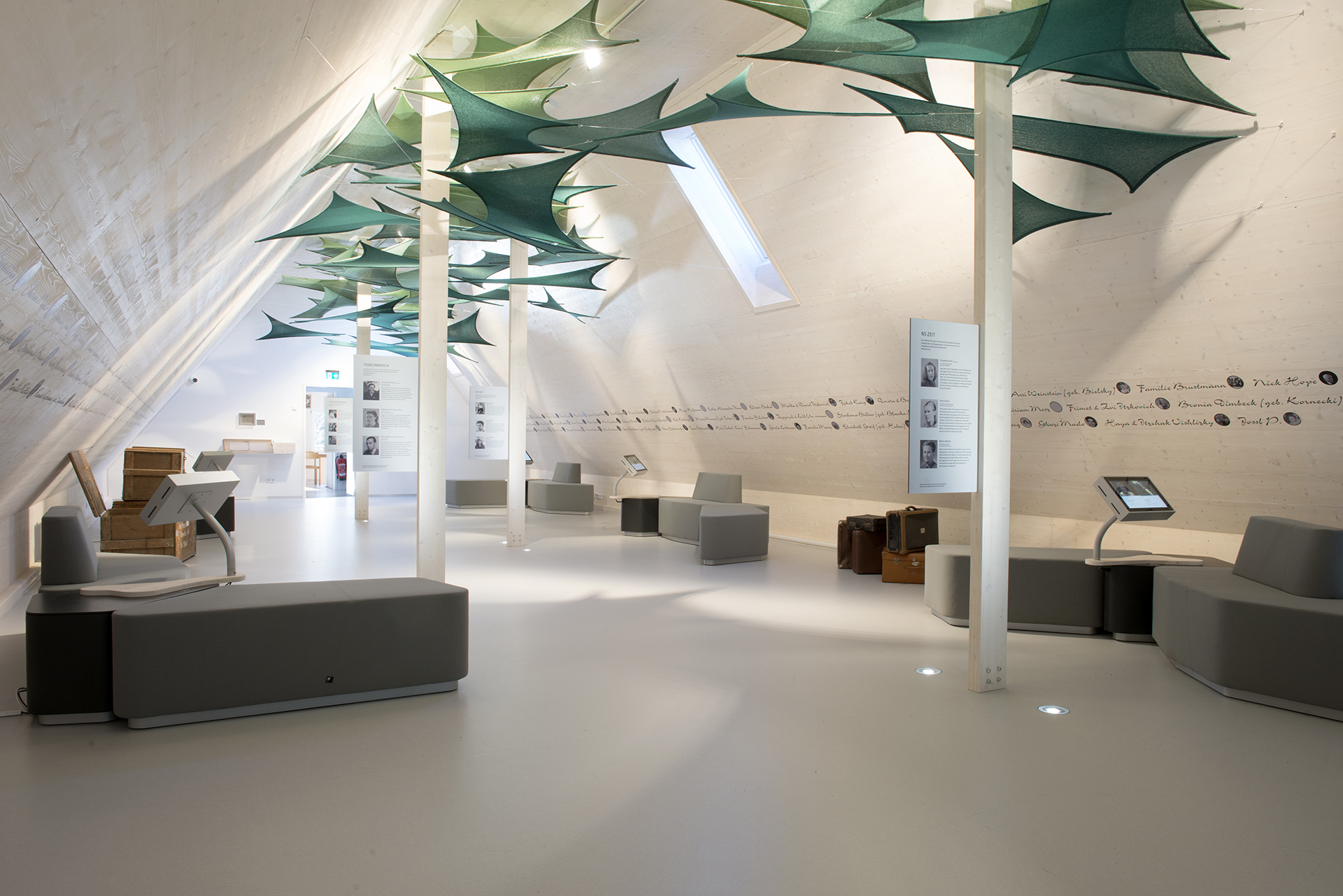
Attic of the Badehaus museum: "Forest of Memories"

==== Attic ====
In the attic the installation "Forest of Memories" gives an insight into the respective destinies of camp Föhrenwald contemporary witnesses and inhabitants from Waldram. By using various media, the different stages are on display employing stylised trees which picture the lives of the Germans drafted to work, the lives of the forced labourers, the lives of the death march survivors, of the Jewish and non-Jewish displaced persons, of expellees and today's migrants. The trees are a symbol, marked by the Scots pines growing in the area. Trees have always been an archetype of life in all religions. Names and photographs of contemporary witnesses are displayed on the walls. Many of these persons were interviewed and give the visitors of the museum an insight into their fates

==== Basement ====
Due to the hillside position, the basement of the building has an outside exit too, and was therefore named "garden storey" by the founders of the museum. Documents of the religious life of the Föhrenwald camp are exhibited in the garden storey. A film is available showing the mikveh which was installed in the cellar during the post-war period; it was used as a ritual bath by the Jewish camp inhabitants.

Also placed on this storey is the radio play Föhrenwald by Michaela Melián which has received several prizes. The artist's drawings extend it into a multimedia-based installation. In the darkened room the floating pictures overlap and create an imaginary walk through the location accompanied by music, texts and quotations. Additionally, there is a room for special exhibitions on this storey used also by the local adult education centre.

==== Outside area ====
The photo documentation Kinderwelten in Föhrenwald und Waldram (Children's Worlds in Föhrenwald and Waldram) is always on display outside the museum. The exhibition Kinderwelten in Föhrenwald und Waldram (Children's Worlds in Föhrenwald and Waldram) serves as basis; the concept for this was created by Kirsten Jörgensen (†) and Sybille Krafft. The outdoor presentation tells the stories of the Jewish children's lives in the Föhrenwald DP camp using historical pictures provided by private individuals as well as documents from international archives. The photographs are contrasted using similar images of Catholic children in Waldram to show the differences as well as the similarities of both groups.

=== Guided tours ===
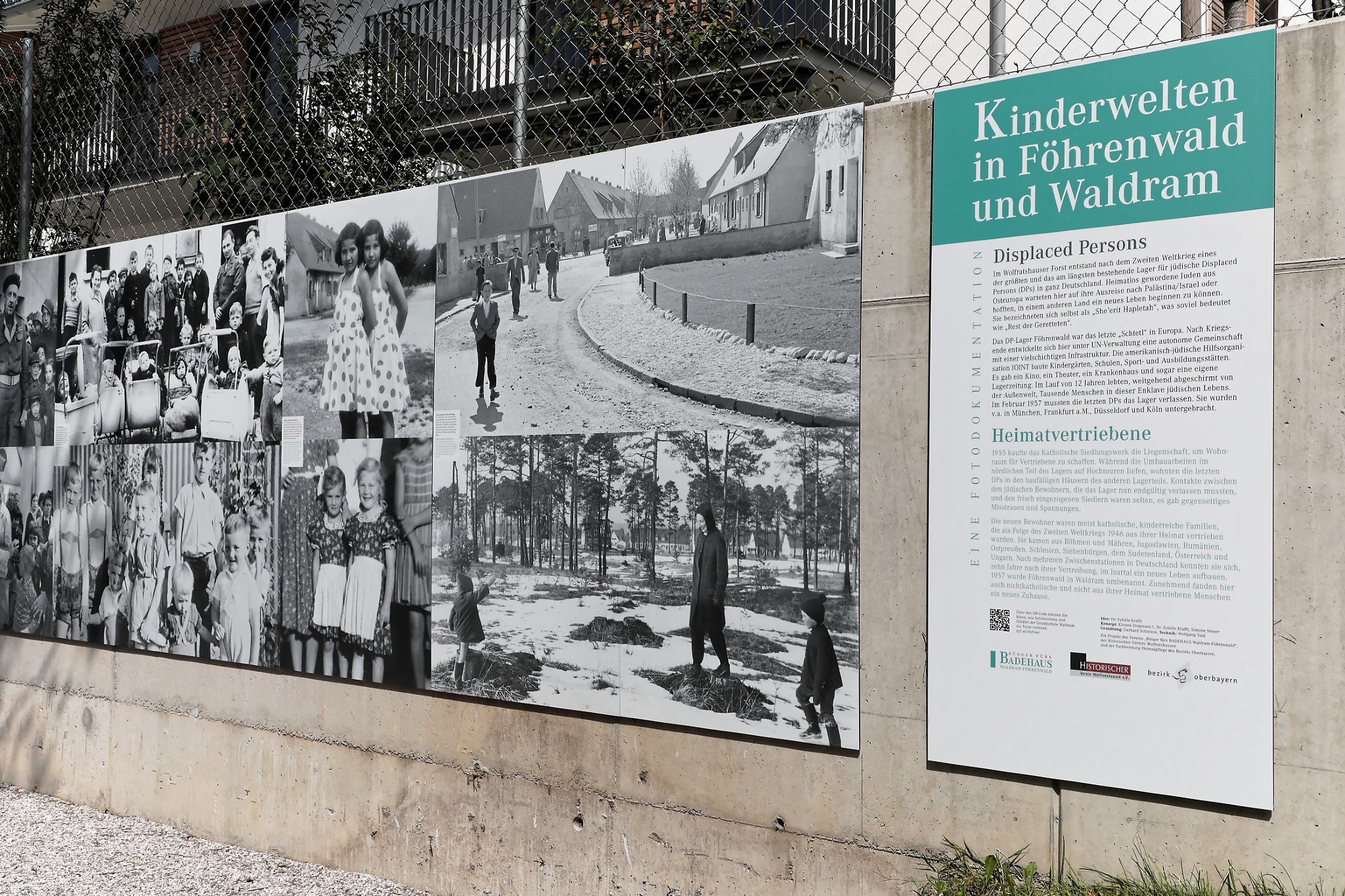
Outdoor exhibition "Children's Worlds in Föhrenwald and Waldram"

Guided tours are conducted on a regular basis in the museum. On request special tours can also be arranged. Visitors can book circular tours around the location and to the remains of the armament factories situated in the former socalled Wolfratshauser Forst (nowadays belonging to the town of Geretsried).

An audio-guide app is provided for both adults and youths giving a tour through the permanent exhibition, an outside circular tour provides information on the location's history.

=== Series of events: Encounters at the Badehaus ===
At these regular events various formats are presented, for example lectures, films, readings, concerts, talks with contemporary witnesses or opening events of exhibitions. The first sequence was held on 20 October 2019. It marked the first jubilee of the opening of the museum with the reading Es gibt noch Sterne über den Ruinen (The stars still shine on the ruins) by the author Dagmar Nick, who writes post-war lyrics and is a contemporary witness with Jewish roots. These meetings at the Badehaus usually take place once a month.

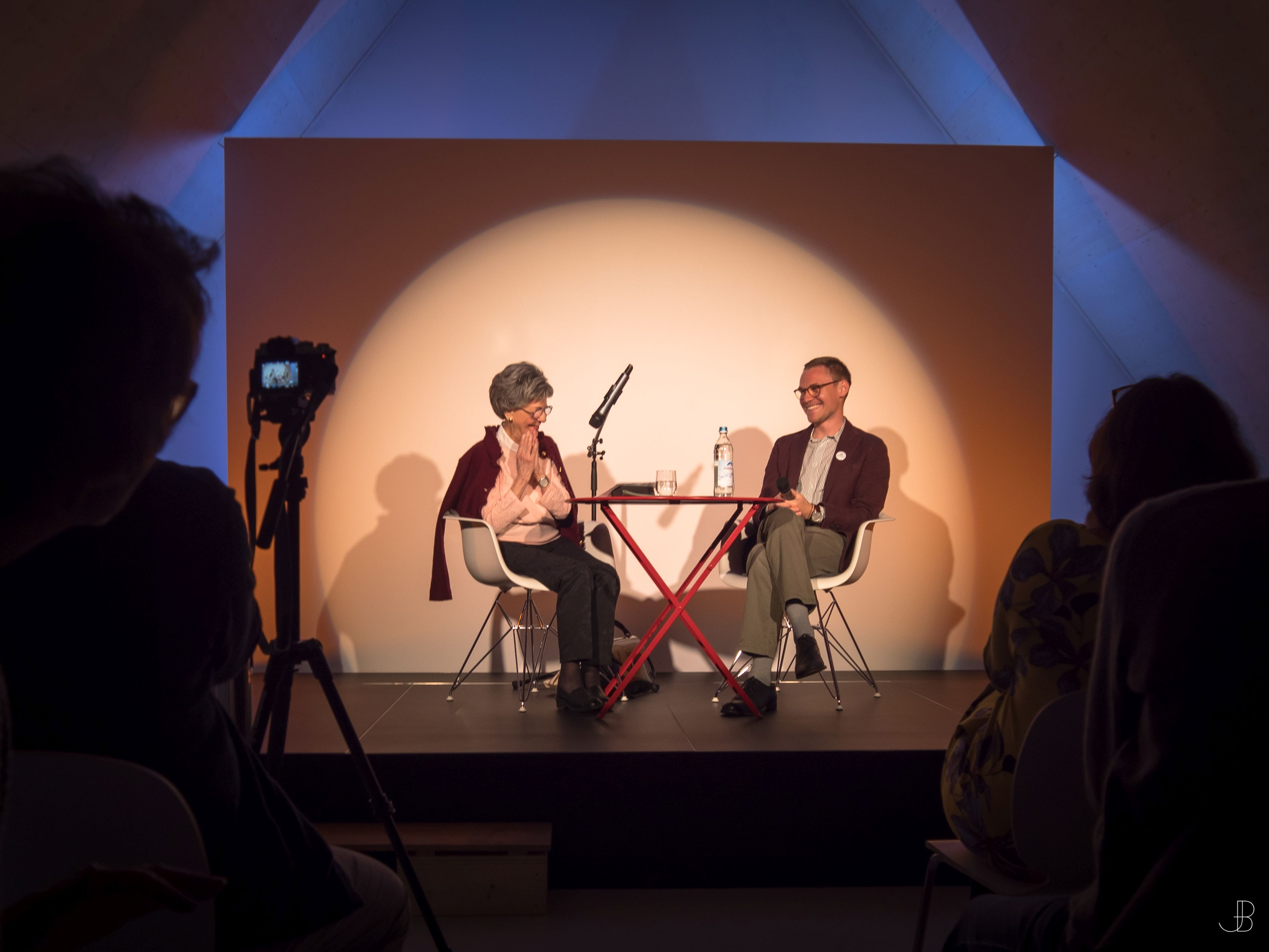
Series of events "Encounters at the Badehaus": author's readings by Dagmar Nick, September 2019

=== Series of events: Artistic interventions ===
Once a year the museum's team invites an artist who can create an artistic intervention outside or inside the Badehaus. This annual sequence was started in 2021.

- November 2021 with Herbert Nauderer
- November 2022 with Michael von Brentano

=== Special exhibitions ===
- From October 2018 until February 2019: Jüdische Architekten der Moderne und ihr Wirken in der Welt (Jewish architects of modern art and their works around the world).

The 100th birthday of the building of the Bauhaus was celebrated in 2019. Prior to this jubilee the museum had displayed photographs of buildings created by Jewish architects in modern-art designs. The concept of this exhibition, developed by Kaija Voss and Sybille Krafft, is based on photographs taken by Jean Molitor; and was in accordance with the festivities for the Bauhaus jubilee all over Germany. It was the very first special exhibition at the newly opened Badehaus museum.

- From April until June 2019: Wasser (Water)

In cooperation with the Bund Naturschutz photographs taken by author and artist Antje Bultmann, who lives in Wolfratshausen, were presented to inspire the visitors to become aware again of the great importance of the element water.

- From July until September 2019: Mitgenommen – Heimat in den Dingen (Baggage taken – native home found in personal possessions)

This exhibition of the society Haus des Deutschen Ostens (Center for the Culture of the Germans in the eastern part of Europe, situated in Munich, Germany) on escape, expulsion and deportation of Germans out of Eastern Europe was supplemented in the Place of Remebrance Badehaus by stories about the personal possessions of families who settled in today's Waldram after their escape and expulsion.

- From December 2019 until September 2020: Von ganz unten – die letzten Dinge (At the very bottom – the last possessions)

This exhibition showed photographs of the possessions of refugees who drowned on their way across the Mediterranean Sea. These items had been found in a wreck of a boat that had sunk in 2015; the Italian photographer Mattia Balsamini took the pictures for Milan's forensic department. The team of the Badehaus museum created an exhibition with that material. The photographic documentation can also be booked as a touring exhibition.

- October 2020 until November 2021: LebensBilder (Pictures of lives)

At the end of the war the surviving remnants, the survivors of the Shoah, assembled in Föhrenwald. In 32 portraits people are shown who, after the war, found a temporary home in the Upper Bavarian Isar valley and who now live in either Germany, Israel or the US. The photographer Justine Bittner from Geretsried took some of the portraits at the Badehaus museum between 2018 and 2020 and wherever the respective interviewed contemporary witnesses are living now. This photographic documentation of can also be booked as a touring exhibition.

- From January 2021 until May 2021: Never forget – never again: Mahnblumen – eine Kunstinstallation (Never forget – never again: Flowers of Remembrance – an artistic installation)

In 2018 the action artist Walter Kuhn created a peace memorial using 3,000 poppies on the Königsplatz in Munich. This artistic installation was shown in several places, in spring 2021 also at the Badehaus museum with 170 flowers of remembrance. It was freely accessible at the outside area of the museum. The period had been chosen deliberately to coincide with the International Holocaust Remembrance Day (27 January) and the date of the end of the war (8 May 1945).

- The team of the museum tries to arrange a new special exhibition every year.

=== Touring exhibitions ===
The management of the museum compiled touring exhibitions which can be hired.

- Since 2012 the touring exhibition Die Kinder vom Lager Föhrenwald (The Children of Camp Föhrenwald) can be booked. It shows the lives of the Jewish children in this displaced persons camp. The exhibition compiled by Kirsten Jörgensen (†) and Sybille Krafft shows photographs provided by private individuals and from international archives. The historical photo documents give an insight into the history of the long-forgotten Jewish post-war childhood in Bavaria.
- Since September 2020 the touring exhibition: Von ganz unten – die letzten Dinge (At the very bottom – the last possessions) is available. It contains the same exhibits as the special exhibition of the same name (refer to special exhibitions).
- Since 2020 the touring exhibition: Die Kinder von Föhrenwald und Waldram (The Children of Föhrenwald and Waldram) can be booked. Compiled in German and English it supplements the touring exhibition Die Kinder vom Lager Föhrenwald with photographs of children from families who moved into this quarter since 1956.

=== Interviews with contemporary witnesses ===
Sybille Krafft has conducted more than 50 biographical interviews with contemporary witnesses who lived in camp Föhrenwald or in Waldram. Films of these interviews were produced, they can be watched and listened to on screens in the museum.

Additionally and on request of the Bavarian Broadcasting Company, Sybille Krafft conducted interviews with Jewish contemporary witnesses. These interviews are also greatly respected at the Badehaus museum. The film recordings were broadcast on the "Alpha-Forum" of ARD and on the Bavarian Television.

=== Special projects ===
- The book: Lebensbilder (Pictures of Life) was published at the end of 2020, with 34 portraits of people who found temporary homes in the Upper Bavarian Isar valley and who now live in either Germany, Israel or the US. The team of the museum tells these stories incorporating many photographs, documents and maps, ISBN 978-3-00-066745-9 in both English and German.
- Documentaries:
  - Von Zeit und Hoffnung (About time and hope). Sebastian d'Huc, a student, filmed talks young members of the Badehaus museum team had with contemporary witnesses and their descendants, who now live in Israel. The documentation gives an insight into the various everyday, religious and political aspects of life in the camp. The respective family's destiny during the Holocaust was part of the talks as were discussions on the reasons why the families decided to emigrate after 1945. In October 2020 the film was premiered at the Badehaus museum during the celebrations for 75 years of Föhrenwald. At the youth film festival flimmern & rauschen in Munich it was nominated for the film prize that was awarded in 2021.
  - Damals im Isartal (In the Isar valley at that time) by Sybille Krafft, commissioned by the Bavarian Television (BR) in 2020
  - Die Kinder vom Lager Föhrenwald (the Children of Camp Föhrenwald) by Sybille Krafft, commissioned by the Bavarian Television (BR) in 2020
  - Als das Grauen vor die Haustür kam (When horror reached the front door): a documentary film by Max Kronawitter about the death march; a short version can be watched at the museum.
- Artistic installation Neues Leben aus den Trümmern (New life grows out of the ruins). The special exhibition Never forget, never again! Flowers of Remembrance was turned into a permanent installation. Together with the artist Walter Kuhn a work of art was created in front of the Badehaus museum: on a disc, comprising 13 elements and engraved with the years from 1933 to 1945, building debris – amongst others so-called "Hitlerbeton" (Hitler concrete) from the nearby former armament factories – was piled up: these remains were found in the surroundings of the Badehaus museum. Fragments of the former roof tiles stick out, left-overs from the Badehaus museum refurbishment and its transformation into a museum. Now flowers of remembrance grow out of debris and ruins.

== Contacts and cooperation ==
The organisers work closely together with many associations and societies when there are common interests and activities with the Badehaus museum. There is an especially close relationship to the Israeli Föhrenwald group Organization of Föhrenwald Descendants.

The association receives support from members living all over the world, who come from various European countries as well as the US, Canada and Israel.

The honorary engagement for the Badehaus museum brings several generations together: pupils, university students and voluntary workers: all make substantial contributions

== Literature ==
- Coenen, Jonathan; Krafft, Sybille et al.: Erinnerungsort Badehaus 2012–2019 (Badehaus museum 2012 – 2019), Wolfratshausen 2019 (booklet)
- Krafft, Sybille et al.: LebensBilder, Portraits from the Jewish DP-camp Föhrenwald, published by the Badehaus museum, Wolfratshausen 2020. ISBN 978-3-00-066745-9.
