= Wolfratshausen =

Place in Bavaria, Germany

- Town
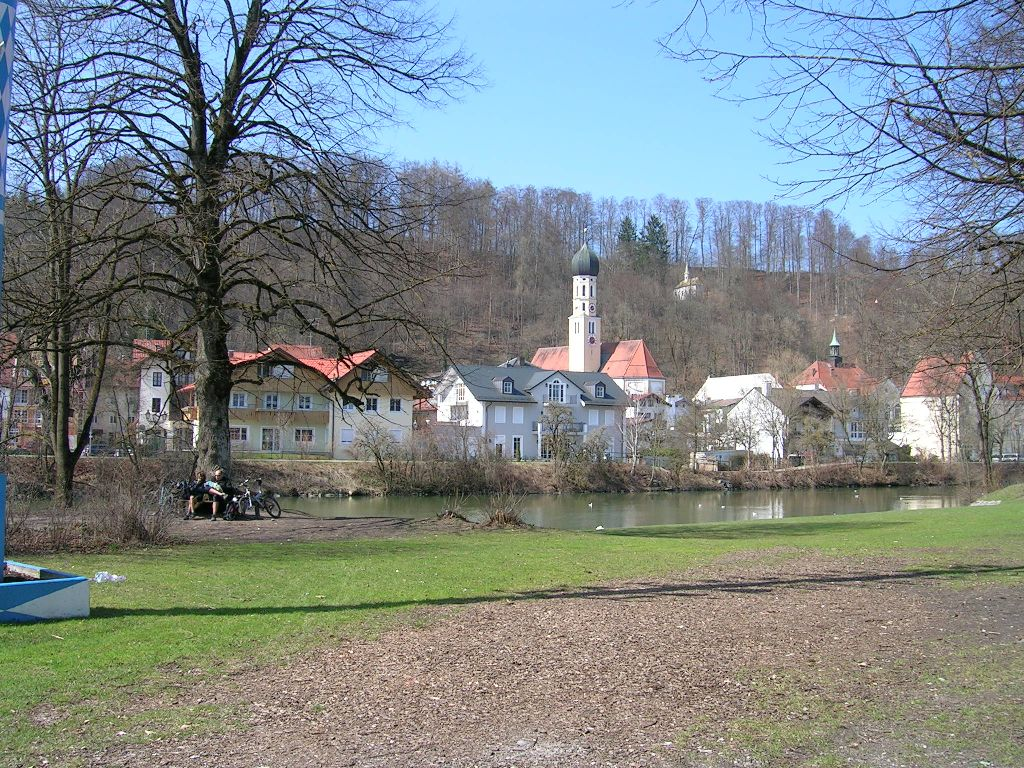
- Wolfratshausen Old Town

- Coat of arms

- Location of Wolfratshausen within Bad Tölz-Wolfratshausen district
- Interactive map of Wolfratshausen
- Location within Germany Location within Bavaria
- Coordinates: 47°54′48″N 11°25′40″E
- Country: Germany
- State: Bavaria
- Admin. region: Oberbayern
- District: Bad Tölz-Wolfratshausen
- Subdivisions: 5 Stadtteile

Government
  - Mayor (2020–26): Klaus Heilinglechner (BVW)

Area
  - Total: 9.13 km^{2} (3.53 sq mi)
- Elevation: 576 m (1,890 ft)

Population (2025-12-31)
  - Total: 19,536
  - Density: 2,140/km^{2} (5,540/sq mi)
- Time zone: UTC+01:00 (CET)
  - Summer (DST): UTC+02:00 (CEST)
- Postal codes: 82515
- Dialling codes: 08171
- Vehicle registration: TÖL, WOR
- Website: www.wolfratshausen.de

Wolfratshausen (German pronunciation: [vɔlfʁaːtsˈhaʊzn̩]) is a town of the district of Bad Tölz-Wolfratshausen, located in Bavaria, Germany. The town had a population of 19,033 as of 31 December 2019.

== History ==
The first mention of "Wolveradeshusun" appears in documents from the year 1003. About 100 years later, Otto II, the Graf of Deißen-Andechs, built a castle on a hill overlooking the valley. The castle was destroyed on 7 April 1734 when lightning struck the tower where gunpowder was stored. Stones from the ruins were transported to Munich where they were used to build the Residenz.

From 1280 the town was designated a market town. In 1286, Conrad Nantwein, a pilgrim from Northern Germany, was arrested and burned at the stake in Wolfratshausen. Pope Boniface VIII canonized Nantwein as St. Nantovinus in 1297.

By the 15th century, the Loisach and Isar rivers were used for water transport, especially logging. River travel continued and rafts operated between Wolfratshausen and Munich. Following the war, the labour camp was used as a displaced persons camp by the Allies. In 1957, Föhrenwald was transformed into a suburb of Wolfratshausen and renamed Waldram, to honour the Lord of Münsing who was one of the founders of the Benediktbeuern Abbey.

In July 1983, Croatian emigre businessman Stjepan Đureković was assassinated by UDBA agents in Wolfratshausen.

Wolfratshausen was formerly the seat of the district government, but this moved to Bad Tölz in 1972.

== Geography ==
Wolfratshausen sits at the confluence of the Isar and Loisach Rivers, at 47°55′N 11°25′E approx. 30 km (19 mls.) southwest of Munich. A canal joins the two rivers to return water diverted for power generation at the Isar Amper Werke to the Isar. The town covers 9.13 square kilometres and is 577 meters above sea level.

== Politics ==
=== Mayor ===
The current mayor of Wolfratshausen is Klaus Heilinglechner of the Bürgervereinigung Wolfratshausen (BVW), who was first elected in 2014 and re-elected both in 2020 and 2026.

=== City council ===
The Wolfratshausen city council (Stadtrat) governs the city alongside the Mayor. The most recent city council election was held on 15 March 2020, and the results were as follows:

Party	Lead candidate	Votes	%	+/-	Seats	+/-
Alliance 90/The Greens (Grüne)	Annette Heinloth	44,639	25.0	▲13.5	6	▲3
Christian Social Union (CSU)	Günther Eibl	39,544	22.2	▼10.3	5	▼3
Citizen's union Wolfratshausen (BVW)	Klaus Heilinglechner	38,965	21.8	▼11.8	5	▼3
Social Democratic Party (SPD)	Manfred Menke	25,512	14.3	▼8.2	4	▼1
List WOR (Liste WOR)	Richard Kugler	22,806	12.8	New	3	New
Free Democratic Party (FDP)	Patrick Lechner	5,354	3.0	New	1	New
Alternative for Germany (AfD)	Timo Klitzsch	1,562	0.9	New	0	New
Valid votes		8,153	97.8			
Invalid votes		188	2.2			
Total		8,341	100.0			±0
Electorate/voter turnout		14,873	56.1	▲2.7		
Source: Votemanager

== Town subdivisions ==
The town of Wolfratshausen is split into the following subdivisions:

- Altstadt
- Weidach
- Nantwein
- Farchet
- Waldram

== Notable people ==
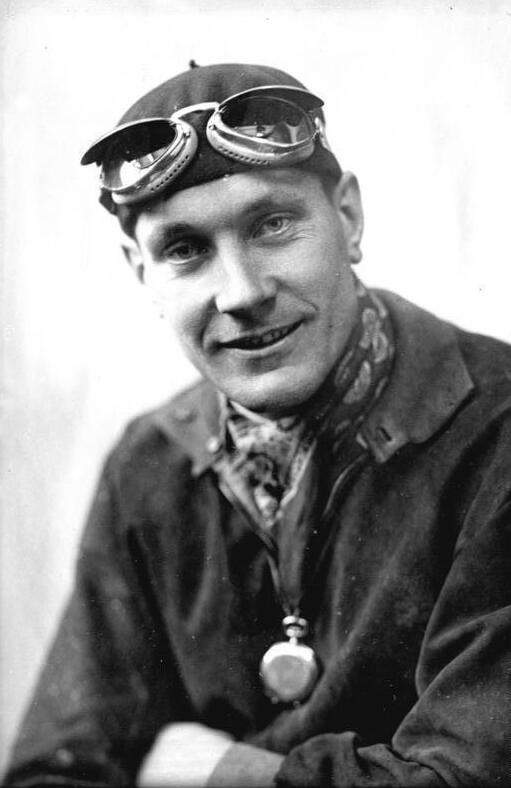
Hans Stuck in 1929

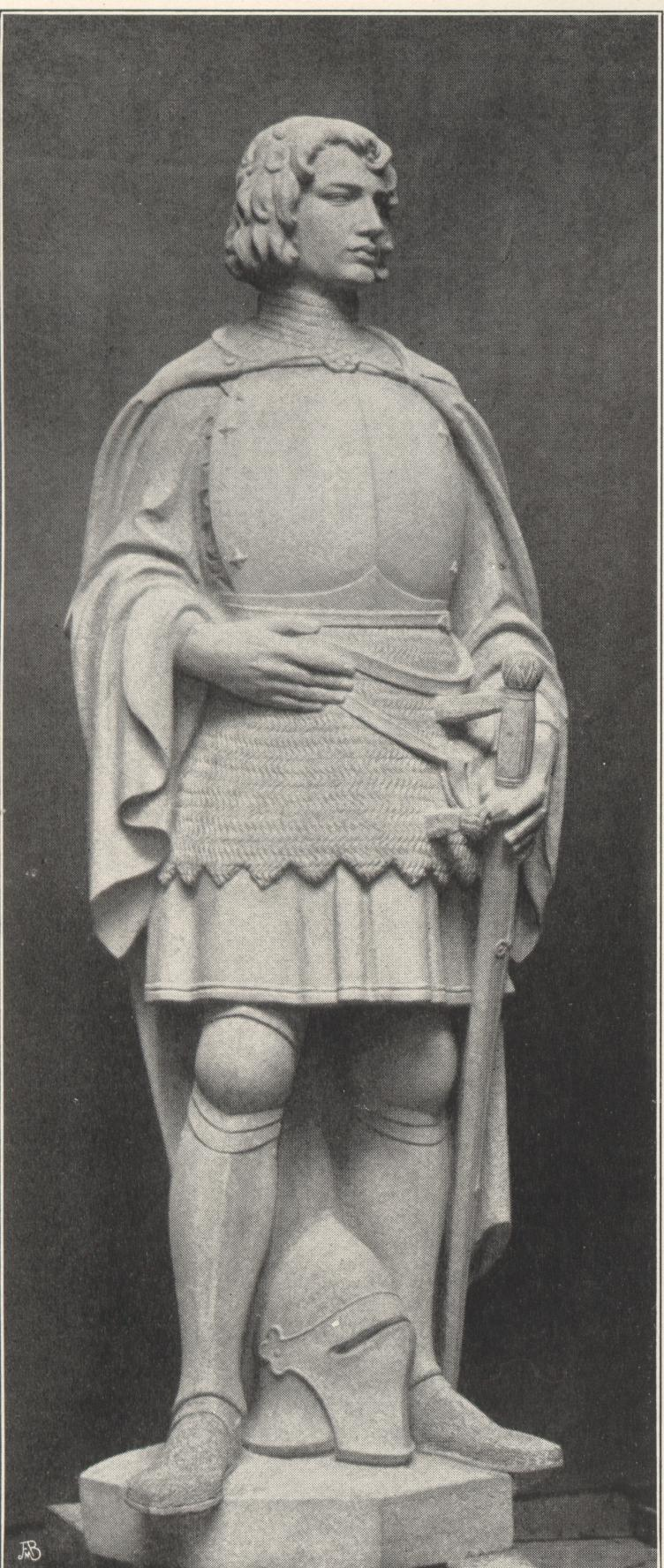
Rudolf II

- St. Nantovinus (d. 1286), Roman Catholic Saint
- Rudolf II, Count Palatine of the Rhine (1306-1353), Palatinate of the Rhine
- Rupert I, Elector Palatine (1309-1390), Palgravegraf of the Rhine and Kurfürst of the Palatinate; founder of the University of Heidelberg which is named after him
- Rainer Maria Rilke (1875-1926), Austrian poet and writer
- Ernst Wiechert (1887-1950), writer and poet, acquired the Gagerthof in Wolfratshausen in 1936
- Hans Stuck (1900-1978), car racing driver
- Edmund Stoiber (born 1941), jurist and politician (CSU), Minister President of the Free State of Bavaria from 28 May 1993 to 30 September 2007
- Gerd Müller (1945-2021), German professional footballer
- Saul Rubinek (born 1948), Canadian Hollywood actor, director and film producer
- Johanna Hagn (born 1973), German judoka
- Florian Wanner (born 1978), German judoka
- Murat Bosporus (born 1979), German wrestling sportsman
- Markus Janka (born 1980), German ice hockey goalie
- Claudia Lichtenberg (born 1985), German professional cyclist
- Wilhelm Bittrich (1894-1979), SS-Obergruppenfuehrer

== Culture, sights, and recreation ==
=== Buildings of note ===
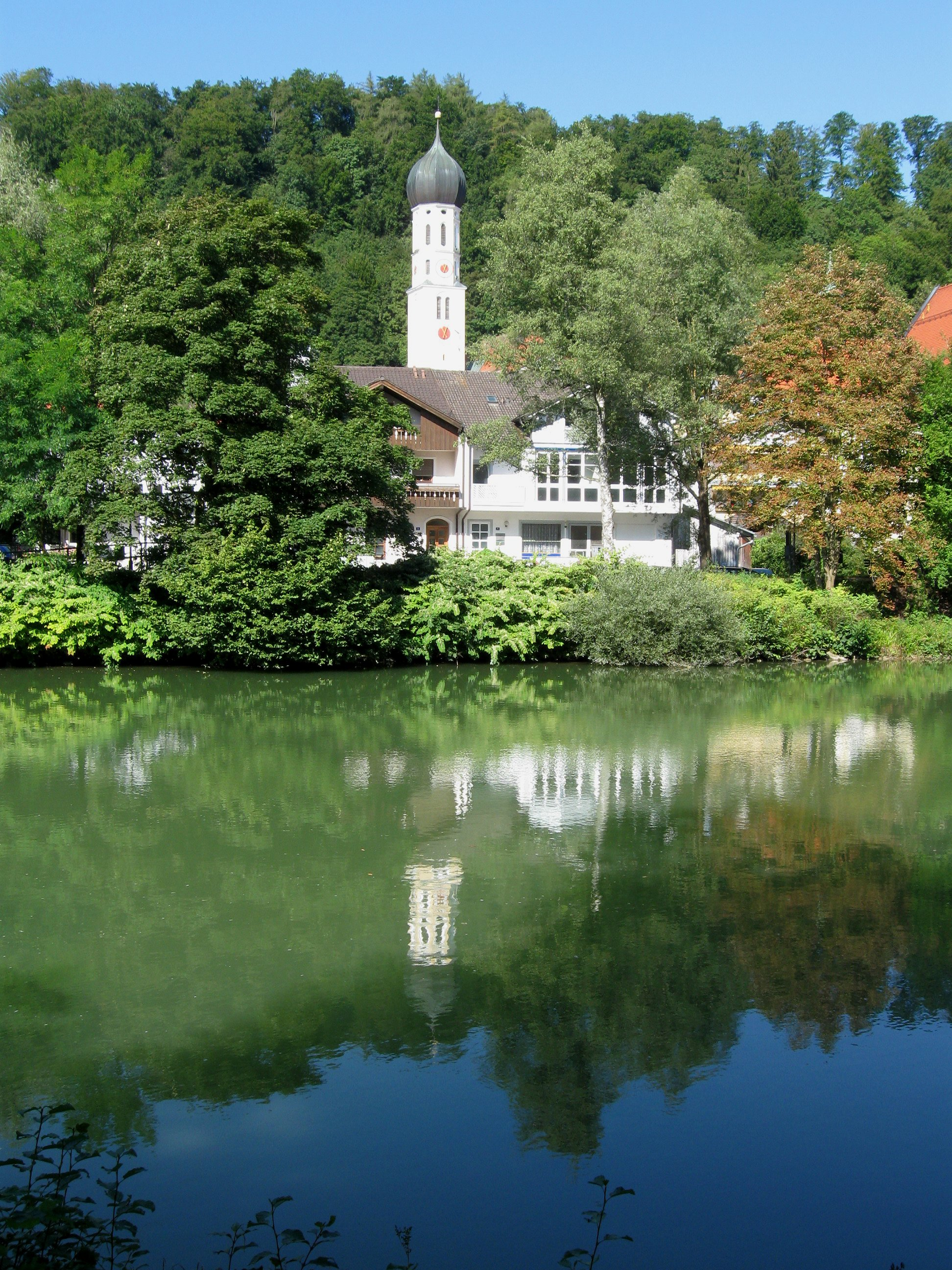
St. Andreas Loisach river Wolfratshausen

- Parish Church "St. Andreas" (erected 1484)
- The Humplbräu, a hotel and restaurant in the historic city center (first mentioned in a document in 1619)
- Historic city center (since 2005 with traffic reduction by use of one-way streets)
- The gallery Schwankl-Eck
- The Loisachhalle, a community exhibition and multi-use hall.

=== Museums ===
- Museum of Local History
- Erinnerungsort Badehaus (Remembrance Place Badehaus)

=== Recreation and travel destinations ===
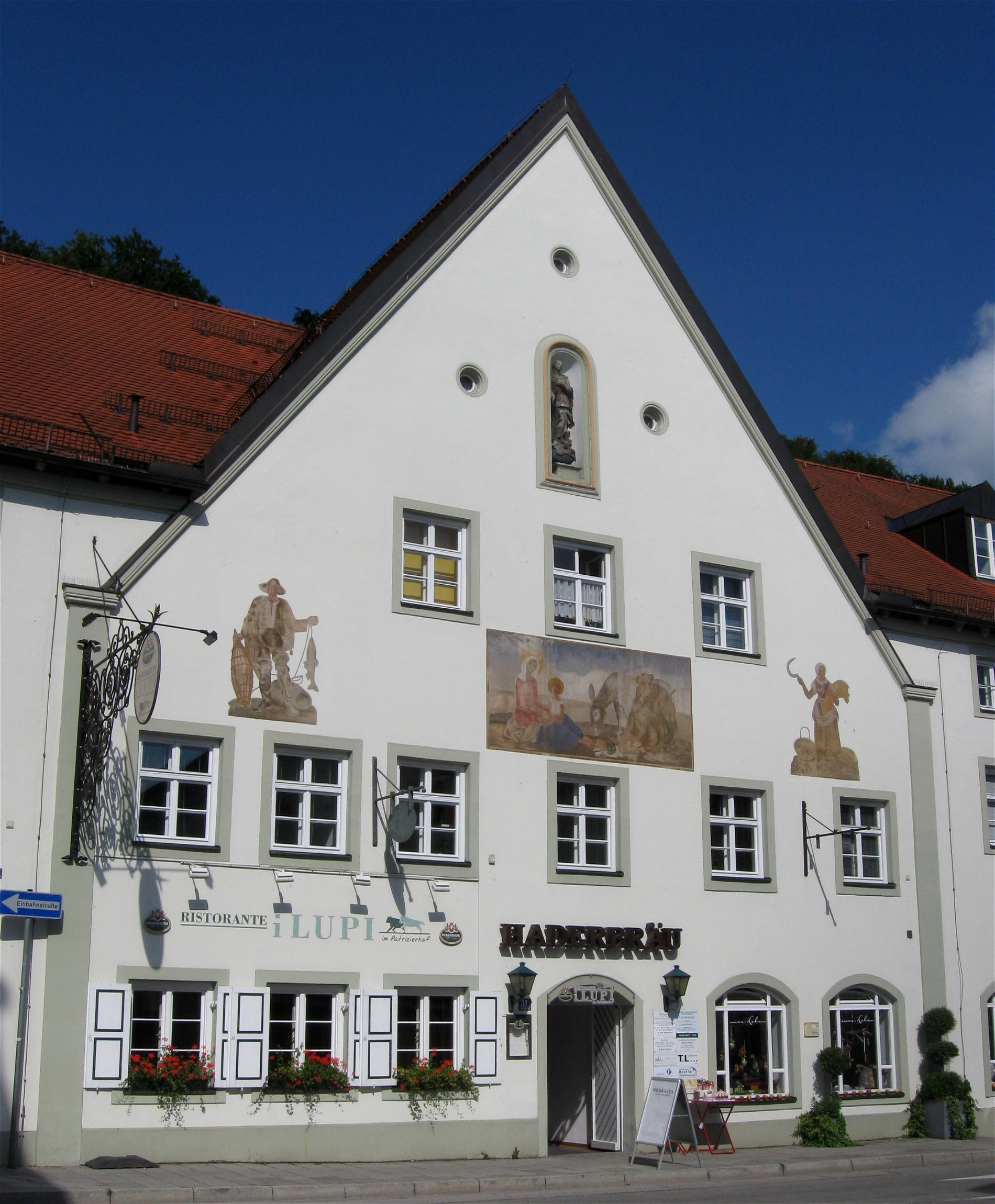
Haderbräu Wolfratshausen

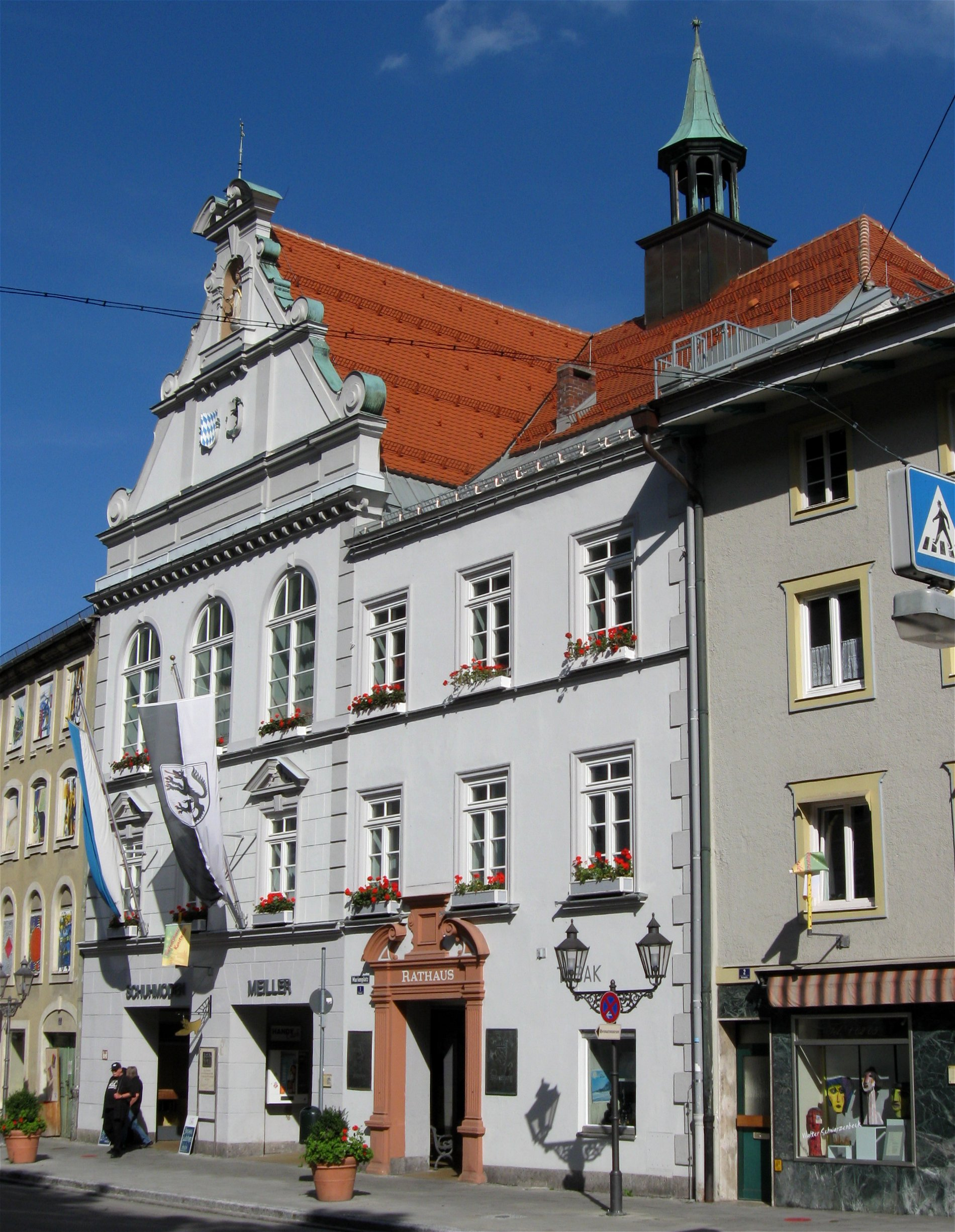
Town hall Wolfratshausen

- Amusement park "Märchenwald im Isartal" (opened 1968).
- Log raft rides on the Isar and Loisach to Munich
- Castle: Even if now only a Commemorative plaque and tuff remnants harken to the memory of this castle, its size can still be imagined. In 1734 the castle was destroyed by an explosion resulting from a lightning strike to the ammunition tower.
- A walk through the hillside forest provides views of the entire city and the peaks of the Karwendel and Wetterstein mountain ranges, from the Wendelstein in the east to the Zugspitze in the south.
- Bike riding or rollerblading through the wildlife reserve Isarauen/Pupplinger Au.
- The Japanese garden Yuko Nihon Teien, a gift from the Japanese sister city Iruma.
- Bike ride to Lake Starnberg (about 12.5 miles)
- The Via Bavarica Tyrolensis, a 140-mile bike path from Munich through the Alps to the Inn river Valley, goes through the Pupplinger Au.
- Skiing at the slopes in Peretshofen and Beuerberg. The larger ski areas can be reached within 1 to 2 hours.
- There are around 125 miles of cross-country ski runs in the surrounding area.

=== Media ===
A police German TV-series "Hubert ohne Staller" (2011–2018: Hubert und Staller) shows the town.
