= Exile of Jews in the Soviet interior during World War II =

During World War II, large numbers of Polish and Soviet Jews fled eastwards from German-occupied Europe or were deported by the Soviet Union. The majority of exiled Polish Jews lived in various labor camps and labor colonies in Central Asia and Siberia for the duration of the war. At the end of the war, Jews displaced in the Soviet Union were the largest group of surviving European Jews, as most of those left behind died in the Holocaust.

== Deportations ==
=== Origins and conditions ===
After the invasion of Poland in 1939 by Nazi Germany and the Soviet Union, between 150,000 and 300,000 Polish Jews entered in the Soviet Union in order to flee the Nazis. Some individuals reported anecdotally that Nazi soldiers seemed almost helpful in pushing the refugees to make their way to Soviet-controlled territory. There are several memoirs written by individual refugees after the war which corroborate this. Many Jews fled to Bialystock, which was considered safer due to the Soviets having military control of that area.

In the first part of the war, the Soviet Union invaded Poland, and all Polish people were treated with basic hostility (most notorious being the 1940 Katyn massacre of Polish and Polish Jewish officers). Their status underwent a major change when Nazi Germany invaded the Soviet Union, thereby causing the Soviet Union to join the Allies. Polish citizens were now considered to be allied with the Soviet Union in the war against the Nazis. As the war progressed, the Soviet Army created some military units consisting of people from Poland.

As the war progressed and the Nazi invaders got further into the Soviet Union, huge numbers of Soviet citizens, mostly Jewish, sought safety by moving east, further into the interior, to escape the Nazi hordes. Due to its knowledge of how Nazis treated Jews, the Soviet government moved Jews from areas such as the Crimean Peninsula into areas further away from the front-lines.

Leo Cooper wrote an autobiographical memoir which was cited by scholarly works, in which he recounted that once Poland was invaded, he fled to the USSR, and accepted an offer to become a Soviet citizen. His skills as a trained "turner", or lathe operator, made him highly-demanded as a worker. He found his treatment by the nearby Russians to be overall favorable.

=== Deportations ===
Beginning in Spring 1940, the deportation of Polish nationals and Jews to the camps occurred mostly by train. Although they were not as brutal as the Nazi transports of the Holocaust, the conditions were still brutal and degrading. All deportees were jammed into cattle cars, for which the only toilet was a hole in the floor. One extensive article by researcher Jonah Goldlust reports as follows:

The operation to “clear” the Polish refugees from the former Polish territories of Western Ukraine and Western Belarus, at first occupied and more recently annexed by the Soviets, began slowly in the spring of 1940. Not only Jews were targeted, but a considerably larger number of ethnic Poles had also moved from German- into Soviet-controlled areas after September 1939. The arrests and deportations reached their peak on the “night of June 29 when hundreds of thousands of people were arrested, most of whom were Jewish and the rest [ethnic] Poles.” They were taken from their homes or sometimes straight off the street. Even some refugees who had taken up Soviet-sponsored jobs, and some who had accepted Soviet citizenship were caught up in the swift and efficient roundup operations and summarily deported on the trains with the rest.

The suddenness of their arrest by Soviet authorities and the rapid events that followed— being herded into overcrowded railcars for a lengthy train journey eastward, often lasting weeks and into parts unknown—is described in detail and sometimes at considerable length in a number of the memoirs. Fela Steinbock tells of being arrested while pregnant and, together with her husband (who was not even one of the “refugees” but a permanent resident of Soviet- occupied Poland), being deported by train to a remote barracks camp in the general vicinity of Krasnoyarsk in central Siberia.

All the firsthand reports are consistent in mentioning the severe discomforts experienced during the journey, in particular the extreme overcrowding in the locked “ cattle cars,” the appalling sanitary conditions, and the minimal food and water available. All travelled for lengthy periods, but Anna Bruell's journey of five weeks on the train before arriving at Tynda, located in the far east of the USSR, seems especially grueling.

== Camp routines and conditions ==
=== Conditions of life in the camps ===
The labor camps were mostly located in Siberia, although a small number were located in areas further south that had more hospitable climate conditions. In general, conditions in the camps were difficult but often were not lethal. Internees received food and medical care.

Conditions in the camp were harsh, but also clearly showed that the Soviet government mainly intended for internees to serve as forced labor and that the Nazi efforts of genocide during that period were not a model or a parallel for the Soviet methods of running the camp.

Internees were placed in bunks that were little more than wooden pallets. Food was not plentiful during the initial period. Any female internees who became pregnant were given medical care. Delousing was crucial for new internees, before becoming residents in such crowded conditions; this was carried out by having the new internees rub a solid yellow chemical mixture onto each other.

Unlike Nazi camps, there was no genocidal machinery, but the conditions were still brutal. Goldust writes:

In writing about the remote camps, most authors [i.e., of memoirs by eyewitnesses] list the numerous hardships they endured: the long hours of labor in forests, mines, and farms; the high work quotas expected and the minimal food rations earned even when these were achieved; the extremes of climate faced, most notably the brutal Russian winter; the serious epidemics, particularly typhoid and malaria, that swept through the camp population; and, as almost everyone mentions, the extreme infestations of bedbugs and lice.

As the war progressed, conditions sometimes improved; for example, in some camps, large new buildings were built for use of internees.

=== Work roles ===
Many camp internees were given professional roles and vocational roles if they had existing training and expertise. Any internees who were physicians were tasked with caring for internees. Carpenters and masons assisted in building camp structures.

Average people in the camps were often assigned to help with logging and forestry work. Some internees were sent to work on local farms in tending crops and harvesting food.

=== Experiences of deportees ===
The conditions in the camps varied depending upon the location, and often for individual groups.

A group of students from the Novardok Yeshiva were deported in a group from Poland to Siberia. Their leader and head teacher was Rabbi Yehuda Leib Nekritz. Their written accounts describe how the NKVD subjected them to harsh persecution, including confiscating all religious texts and prohibiting most religious services. One of the prominent rabbis interned with this group was Rav Yaakov Galinsky.

Despite a long chain of constant persecutions, the yeshiva students continually tried to observe the Sabbath. According to the biography of Rav Galinsky, the Jewish students would pass pieces of wood to each other, to avoid transgressing the Sabbath prohibition against carrying objects. According to this account, the Soviet supervisors for this work group actually commended them for this method, as being highly efficient.

According to an account by Rav Yaakov Pasternak, recounted in the book by Rabbi Shlomo Weintraub, Rabbi Nekritz was consistent in advocating for the right to observe the Sabbath, and finally permission was granted. Pasternak states that in order to show their willingness to meet expectations and to do their work, the students would present themselves to the camp officials when the Sabbath ended on Saturday night, in order to do their workload and to make up for the time missed during the Sabbath.

== Historiography ==
The exile of Jews to Siberia and other regions of the Soviet Union during World War II has been noted by many historians to be a relatively neglected chapter of Jewish history. In fact, the recent growing awareness of this topical area as of the early 2020s in itself is one aspect of this history. In recent years, historians, documentary filmmakers, and other chroniclers have begun to pay increasing attention to this area of history.

In 2013, one historian wrote:

"Soviet dictator Joseph Stalin... inadvertently saved Polish Jews from the Nazi death camps and gas chambers by deporting them to Siberia and other parts of the USSR. In 1940, one year before the Nazis commenced their program of extermination, Stalin ordered the deportation of some 200,000 – perhaps as many as 300,000 -- Polish Jews from Russian-occupied Eastern Poland to Gulag labor camps deep in the Soviet Union. Notwithstanding his virulent anti-Semitism (and his own sanctioning of the killing of Jews within Russia itself), Stalin's order ironically saved these Jewish lives – indeed, these deportees represented the bulk of Polish Jewry who survived the Nazi Holocaust."

"The story of how these Polish Jews survived the war had remained largely unknown until decades after the fact."

"In 2007, a Polish-born American documentary producer and director named Slawomir Grunberg released a film called “Saved by Deportation” which told the story of some of the Polish Jews who were spared the death camps by being transported to the Soviet Union. The documentary charts the story of Asher and Shyfra Scharf, two Polish Jews who were sent to the Muslim-dominated regions of Tajikistan and Uzbekistan in Central Asia, as well as Siberia. Another Jewish deportee, a woman named Sylvia Becker, told the filmmakers of her harrowing tale of fleeing the Germans in western Poland for the east, eventually ending up in a labor camp near the Arctic Circle."

== Individual memoirs and experiences ==
Owing to the nature of the historical record, much information on camp conditions is based on individual accounts, either in published works or interviews or both. Such accounts have validity on the basis of being depicted in published works by reliable authors, or else compiled by reliable researchers. They often provide valuable data about conditions in the aggregate, especially if corroborated by several accounts. As accounts of firsthand experiences, they do have some significance within the overall historical record.

Numerous published accounts by Jewish authors and publishers provide individual and anecdotal experiences. Owing to Jewish historical experiences and persecution during this era, various works published on the topic of Jewish history provide some substantial historical materials on this topical area.

On the role and the context for individual memoirs, Goldlust writes:

We see in virtually every aspect of the memorization process, either the total exclusion of the Polish refugee experience from the status of “survivor hood,” as is often the case with museums and displays devoted to the Holocaust, or, at best and only recently, an allowance of some of the Poles who were in the Soviet Union.

A similar pattern can be discerned with the emergence over the past twenty years of published autobiographical memoirs written by Polish Jews who had been in the USSR. I have drawn on fourteen of these for this chapter, and more have been and continue to be published, but, again, their number and distribution must be considered in a broader context. The distinguished historian of the Holocaust Yehuda Bauer pointedly observed in his foreword to Zev Katz's autobiography that, compared with the many hundreds of memoirs that have been written by Holocaust survivors, “not many Jews who fled or were deported to the Soviet Union wrote memoirs.”

=== Edith Sekules memoir ===
Edith Sekules, a former internee, wrote a memoir about her experiences. Sekules emigrated to Ireland with her husband and children and ran the Kilkeel Knitting Factory there. Her son Walter spoke publicly and gave interviews to major newspapers about experiences in the Soviet camps.

==== Camp conditions ====
The memoir by Edith Sekules relates the anecdotes below about general camp conditions

- Any mothers giving birth were given immediate exemption from work in order to be treated in the camp hospital. Sekules recounts how one Romanian internee in the Gorki camp, Mrs. Nacht, gave birth, and then was told she could not enter the hospital since the birth had already occurred. However, she had a nurse who reportedly "took no-nonsense" and was insistent until Mrs. Nacht was fully admitted for medical treatment.
- Sekules reports that the food was awful, but was provided consistently.
- A Politruk, or political instructor, would read the news to internees once per week. German advances against Soviet forces were reported openly to internees, but Sekules recounts this with a note that she cannot recall these interactions in enough detail to be sure whether such news was free of propaganda.
- Sekules had a baby son, Walter, who fell ill and would cry every night. Another internee complained, and Sekules was called to see the commandant to explain. When she told him her child cried due to illness, he personally took her to the food storeroom and told her to take some food to feed her child properly.
- When Walter continued to cry frequently, a Polish medical orderly recommended blood transfusions, using Sekules as a donor. According to Sekules, this treatment was fully effective and successful.

==== Later phases of the war ====
Sekules relates that as the war entered into its later phases, life in the camp began to reflect a genuine work routine, rather than punitive conditions.

- Internees were given tacit approval to grow their own vegetables in small gardens.
- Numerous buildings were rebuilt or expanded.
- Internees were given new living quarters with more room.
- When supplies became more plentiful, the camp cooks tried to make food with better flavor and taste.

=== Novardok yeshiva ===
A group of students from the Novardok yeshiva were deported as a group, and largely remained together during their internment in Siberia. Their experiences are recounted in The Alter of Novardok: The life of Rav Yosef Yoizel Horowitz and his worldwide impact, a book published in 2020 by ArtScroll.

== Political conditions ==
At the beginning of the war, all Polish internees were considered hostile aliens. When the Nazis attacked the Soviet Union, then the Soviets became allies of the Polish, and internees were given increased options to serve in the war. Some Polish units were established by the Red Army.

Internees were given periodic updates on the progress of the war. When the Germans attacked Stalingrad, some camps were potentially threatened by the proximity of German forces.

Internees received news on the Nazi persecution of Jews, but often thought this was merely Soviet propaganda. The majority of internees had no awareness of the scale of the destruction until they returned home once the war ended.

== Return of internees ==
Once the war ended, internees were permitted to go home. Permission for this was provided at various times for batches of refugees based on their national origins. Due to limitations on available trains, this process was very gradual. Internees from Austria and Hungary did not get permission until January 1947.

== See also ==
=== General topics ===
- Displaced persons camps in post–World War II Europe
- Jews in Siberia

=== Regional histories and topics ===
- Displaced Persons camp
- Eastern Front (World War II)
- Excess mortality in the Soviet Union under Joseph Stalin
- Flight of Poles from the USSR
- Gulag
- The Holocaust in Poland
- The Holocaust in the Soviet Union
- Population transfer in the Soviet Union
- Soviet Union in World War II
- Soviet repressions of Polish citizens (1939–1946)

=== Historical events and topics ===
- Rescue of Jews during the Holocaust
- Righteous Among the Nations

== Bibliography ==
- From Kletz to Siberia: A Students Wandering During the Holocaust, Mesorah Publishing, 1985.
- The Alter of Novardok: The life of Rav Yosef Yoizel Horowitz and his worldwide impact, by Rabbi Shlomo Weintraub, translated from Hebrew, Artscroll Mesorah Publications, 2020
