= Zvi Aryeh Rosenfeld =

American rabbi and educator

Rabbi Zvi Aryeh Rosenfeld

Personal life
- Born: 1922 Gdynia, Poland
- Died: 11 December 1978 (age 56) Jerusalem, Israel
- Spouse: Tzipporah Faivelson
- Children: 4
- Parents: Rabbi Yisrael Abba Rosenfeld (father); Liba Leah Rosenfeld (mother)
- Dynasty: Breslov
- Occupation: Rabbi, educator

Religious life
- Religion: Judaism
- Yahrtzeit: 11 Kislev 5739
- Dynasty: Breslov
- Semikhah: Rabbi Avraham Yoffen, Rabbi Avraham Sternhartz

Zvi Aryeh Benzion Rosenfeld (1922 – 11 December 1978) was an American rabbi and educator credited with introducing Breslov Hasidism to the United States. Teaching children, teens, and adults in New York City for nearly three decades, he inspired a large percentage of his students from non-religious and Modern Orthodox homes to become Hasidic, and also acquainted them with the teachings of the 19th-century Hasidic master Rebbe Nachman of Breslov. He led the first official group of American Breslovers to Rebbe Nachman's grave in Uman, Ukraine, in 1963, and arranged for the first English translation of two key Breslov texts, Shivchei HaRan and Sichot HaRan. He was also an active supporter of the Breslov community in Israel, raising charity funds on behalf of needy families and the majority of funds for the construction of the Breslov Yeshiva in the Mea Shearim neighborhood of Jerusalem.

== Early life and education ==
Zvi Aryeh Rosenfeld was born in 1922 in Gdynia, Poland, to Rabbi Yisrael Abba Rosenfeld and his wife Liba Leah. His great-grandfather was Rabbi Aharon Goldstein, the Rav of the town of Breslov; he was also a descendant of Rabbi Shmuel Yitzchok Rosenfeld, the Rav of Tcherin. Both ancestors were prominent followers of Rebbe Nachman. At the age of six months he contracted diphtheria, then a serious childhood illness, and the name Benzion was appended to his name as a prayer for his recovery.

In 1924, Rosenfeld immigrated to the United States with his parents, settling in Brownsville, Brooklyn, New York. He was a student at Yeshiva Rabbi Chaim Berlin for elementary school and Yeshiva Torah Vodaas for high school. He then learned at Yeshivas Bais Yosef-Novardok, where he became a study partner of the son of the rosh yeshiva, Rabbi Avraham Yoffen. After completing the entire Talmud for the second time at the age of 23, Rosenfeld received semicha (rabbinical ordination) from Yoffen. Four years later, he received semicha from Rabbi Avraham Sternhartz, leader of the Breslov Hasidim in Jerusalem, who tested him on his knowledge of Talmud, Midrash, Shulchan Aruch, Zohar, and Kabbalah. He also completed a course in accounting.

== Teaching career ==
After his marriage in 1946, Rosenfeld studied Torah in the mornings and taught in a Talmud Torah in the afternoons. He prepared boys for their bar mitzvahs; among his students were the two sons of Rabbi Yechezkel Kahana, the Talmud Torah principal: Meir and Nachman. Rosenfeld also served as rabbi of the Young Israel of Coney Island.

In 1947 his father died and Rosenfeld assumed his charitable activities, which included fundraising for the small Breslov community in Israel. Rosenfeld began corresponding with Rabbi Sternhartz, and visited him in Israel for the first time in 1949. At that time, he expressed his wish to live in the Breslov community in Israel, but Sternhartz urged him to continue as a teacher in America, telling him "that the merit of saving one Jewish soul was worth more than the merit of living in Israel". Imbued with a sense of purpose, Rosenfeld moved his family to the Flatbush neighborhood of Brooklyn, which then had a largely non-religious Jewish community, and continued teaching at the Talmud Torah of the Shaarei Tefillah synagogue run by Rabbi Kahana for 15 years.

Through his teaching and personal example, Rosenfeld inspired a large percentage of his students from non-religious and Modern Orthodox homes to become religious. Dozens of boys transferred from public school to yeshiva, and Rosenfeld arranged for children to attend religious summer camps. A group of boys aged 9 to 15 spent each Shabbat together in the synagogue and came to his house on Shabbat afternoon to hear a lesson from him. Some parents were resistant and even hostile to Rosenfeld's outreach efforts, accusing him of "brainwashing" and "kidnapping" their children, but he persevered.

Rosenfeld also taught Sephardic students at the Magen David day school in Bensonhurst, and gave classes at the two main synagogues for the Syrian Jewish community, Shaarei Tzion and Achiezer. Teaching halacha according to the Sephardic tradition and reading the Torah with the Sephardic accent, Rosenfeld became a mentor to these Americanized, second-generation Syrian Jewish youth.

== Activities on behalf of Breslov Hasidism ==
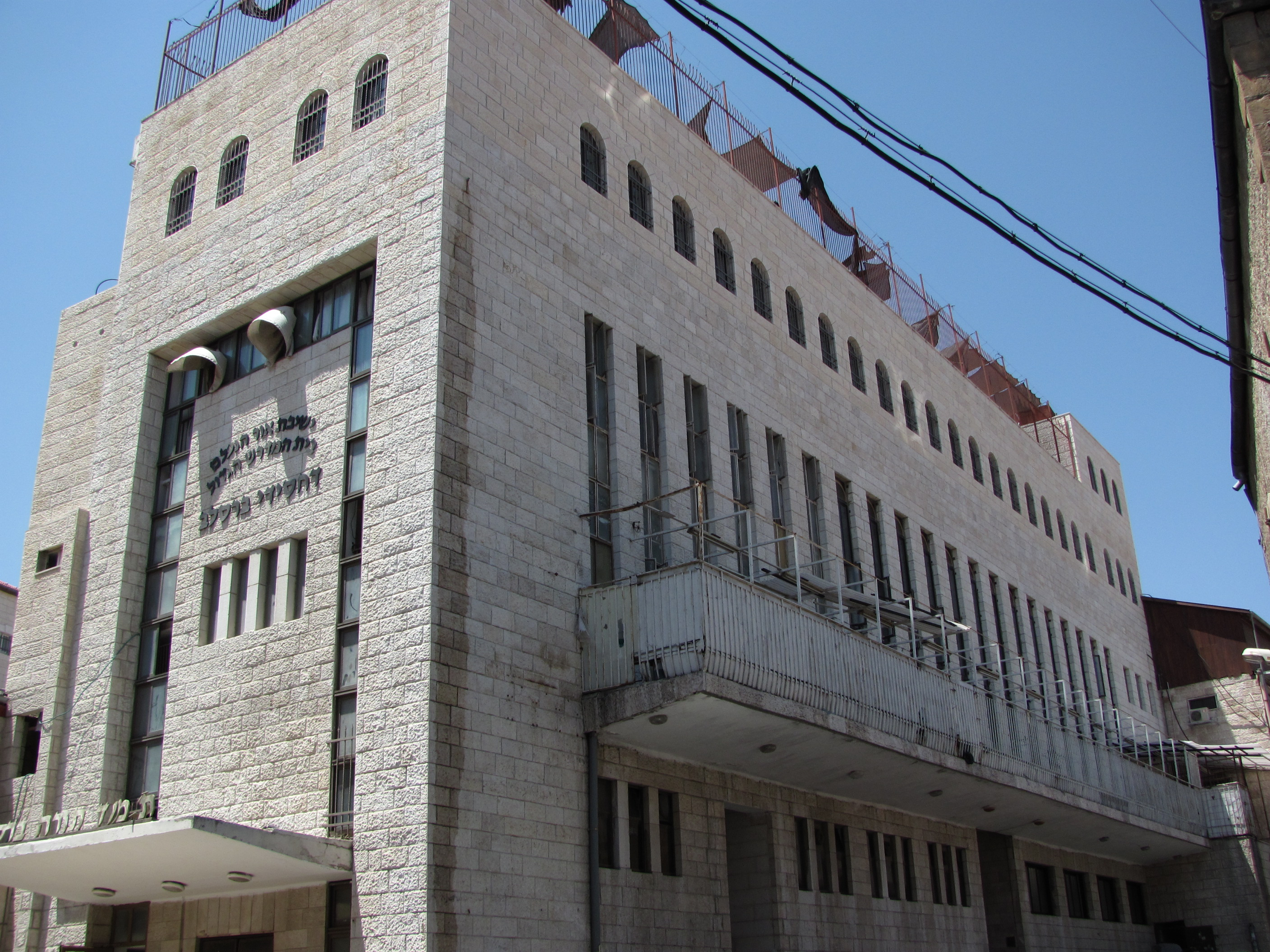
The Breslov yeshiva and synagogue in Mea Shearim, Jerusalem, built in 1953

Rosenfeld concurrently introduced his students to the teachings of the 19th-century Hasidic master, Rebbe Nachman of Breslov. At the time, very few people in America had even heard of Rebbe Nachman. Rosenfeld is credited with introducing Breslov Hasidism to the United States. Students of Rosenfeld, both Ashkenazic and Sephardic, became the Breslov teachers of the next generation in America and Israel.

In addition to giving thousands of classes to English-speaking students, Rosenfeld arranged for the first English translation of two key Breslov texts, Shivchei HaRan and Sichot HaRan. He tapped Rabbi Aryeh Kaplan to do the translation and he edited the finished work, which was published under the title Rebbe Nachman's Wisdom.

Since the end of World War II, the grave of Rebbe Nachman, in the city of Uman, Ukraine, had been an impossible to reach goal for Breslovers living outside the Soviet Union. The Soviets had turned the city into a closed military zone that was off-limits to foreign visitors. With the help of a travel agent who had connections to Soviet chairman Nikita Khrushchev, Rosenfeld led the first official group of American Breslovers to Uman in December 1963. He returned with other groups of students in 1966 and 1967, and visited the grave another 13 times before his death. Uman was eventually opened to foreigners after the fall of communism in 1989.

Rosenfeld was an active supporter of the Breslov community in Israel. He collected charity funds to support needy Breslov families there, and was the major contributor of funds for the building of the Breslov Yeshiva in the Mea Shearim neighborhood of Jerusalem.

== Personal life ==
Rosenfeld married Tzipporah Faivelson in 1946. They had four children.

== Later life and legacy ==
Rosenfeld visited the Breslov community in Israel every year and eventually wanted to reside there himself. When he was diagnosed with cancer at the age of 56, he moved to Jerusalem to spend his remaining months. He arrived in the summer of 1978 and died on 11 December that year (11 Kislev 5739).

Rosenfeld recorded more than 1,000 lectures on Talmud, Halacha, Kabbalah and Hasidic teachings. These recordings have been archived online by his son-in-law, Rabbi Nasan Maimon.

In 1979, one year after Rosenfeld's death, his son-in-law, Chaim Kramer, established the Breslov Research Institute to continue the effort to translate and publish Breslov teachings in English.

== Sources ==
- Fleer, Gedaliah (2005). Against All Odds. Breslov Research Institute. ISBN 978-1-928822-05-9.
- Katz, Rabbi Shlomo, ed. (2017). Rebbe Nachman's Soul: A commentary on Sichos HaRan from the classes of Rabbi Zvi Aryeh Rosenfeld, z"l. Vol. 1. Breslov Research Institute. ISBN 978-1-944-731-00-7.
- Kramer, Chaim (1989). Crossing the Narrow Bridge: A practical guide to Rebbe Nachman's teachings. Breslov Research Institute. ISBN 0-930213-40-8.
