= Gershon Liebman =

European Orthodox rabbi (1905-1997)

- Born: 1905; Ostropol, Russian Empire
- Died: 8 March 1997 (aged 92); Paris, France

Gershon Liebman (1905 – 8 March 1997) was a rabbi, Holocaust survivor, and leader of the Novardok Yeshiva movement after World War II. He was the rosh yeshiva (head of school) of the Novardok Yeshiva in France, where he created 40 Torah institutions.

Liebman devoted his life to rebuilding the Novardok style of musar and service of God through intensive work on one's personal character traits after the Novardok movement was largely destroyed in the Holocaust.

== Biography ==
=== Before World War II ===
Liebman was a student of the Novardok Yeshiva.

Before World War II, he Rabbi Avraham Yoffen were the rabbinical leaders of the Novardok Yeshiva branch in Białystok. At the time, he was known as Rav Gershon Ostropoler ("of Ostropol," his hometown). He was a friend of Rabbi Yaakov Yisrael Kanievsky and accompanied him from Białystok to Vilna for Kanievsky's engagement to Pesha Miriam Karelitz, sister of Rabbi Avrohom Yeshaya Karelitz.

=== During World War II ===
During the war, Liebman endured many horrors, first at the hands of the Soviets and later by the Nazis. In 1941, before he was sent to the camps, the Russians had already sent the entire Novardok Yeshiva of Białystok to Siberia, and the Germans were forcing Jews to dig their own graves at Ponar and shooting them into the open pits. Liebman wasn't caught when the Germans came in. He approached the Jewish head of the ghetto and asked if he could open a yeshiva. He persisted until he was granted permission. He collected as many ration cards as he could for the yeshiva staff and saved many people that way. The yeshiva in the ghetto was open until he and his students were deported by the Germans to the camps.

When he was brought into the camp and his clothes and belongings were taken away from him, he made the acquaintance with one of the workers who would be able to obtain for him a pair of tefillin in exchange for his ration of bread. He also managed to get a sefer Torah.

A circle of students formed around him, with whom he shared his daily ration of food. Once he was having heart palpitations and begged some of the other inmates to lend him a bit of their rations to preserve his life, to be paid back later. Since they trusted him, they were willing to do so.

He continued to study musar and work on his character traits just as if he was still in the yeshiva. In the evenings, after a day of backbreaking work, he taught his students musar and Mishnayos. Part of the time while at slave labor he would hide in a shed to study, and even while working he often pulled out a Tanakh and studied.

=== After World War II ===
On the very day Bergen-Belsen was liberated, Liebman opened a yeshiva. It was the first post-liberation yeshiva. Soon afterward. Liebman found an old synagogue in Hanover with a full set of Mishnayos, and divided it up so the boys would have something to study.

People with no desire to live (many of them Hungarian) came to him for advice and encouragement, and everyone was taken into his yeshiva.

In November 1948, Liebman traveled to France. He resided first in Lyon. Then he moved closer to Paris, to Bailly. At a time when there were many Jews in France, but little Jewish infrastructure in place, Liebman was instrumental in building a network of Jewish schools in Lyon, Marseille, Paris and farther afield. In its heyday, the network had 40 schools and 6,000 students. He would travel all over France to check in on everything.

When Liebman obtained funding from the American Jewish Joint Distribution Committee to set up a yeshiva, and eventually a full-fledged community, he set his sights on rural France, far from the distractions of the big city and close to the forest he felt was a critical element in full-blown service of God. He had no question that the funding he secured from the Joint was God's personal stamp of approval for the project. Initially, he founded a community in Fublaines, where he set up a yeshiva, and eventually purchased other parcels of land where he founded communities in Armentières-en-Brie and in Bussières, Seine-et-Marne.

Liebman traveled to Morocco to spread the word about the yeshiva, spending five weeks going from village to village recruiting boys. By 1949 the first group of students arrived. Shortly thereafter, he opened a women's division.

Liebman was always perfecting his character traits and running away from honor. After the war, leading rabbis such as Rabbis Herzog, the former Chief Rabbi of Israel, and Eliezer Silver came to visited his yeshivas, but he avoided them because he didn't want to be given any honors.

When someone once inadvertently sat down on his foot, although it was quite painful, he allowed the person to sit there and said nothing. This was one of the ways he worked on perfecting his tolerance.

During the week, Liebman lived with the boys in the yeshivah while his wife stayed in their apartment. On Shabbat he went home, and on Jewish holidays she went to him in the yeshivah.

Liebman would spend hours alone in the forest, and encouraged others to do the same. When he came back from the forest, he would deliver a musar lesson. He also spoke every Friday night and on Motzei Shabbat, telling people what they needed and what they did not really need, what they could relinquish and what they should not.

=== Death ===
Liebman died in March 1997 at the age of 92. His wife died in January 2004. They had no children.

== Literary depiction ==
Chaim Grade based the character Hersh Rasseyner on Liebman in his short story, "My Quarrel with Hersh Rasseyner," which describes the chance meeting of a Holocaust survivor with an old friend from the mussar Yeshiva. The narrator has lost his faith, while Rasseyner has continued to lead a pious and devoted religious life. The former friends debate the place of religion in the postmodern world. Grade and Liebman had been friends in Novardok before the war. Grade recounted that he had a short conversation with Liebman, and created this story on what he imagined Liebman would say to him if he had the words. The story has been made into a film, The Quarrel, and a play.
