= Avraham Yoffen =

Rabbi

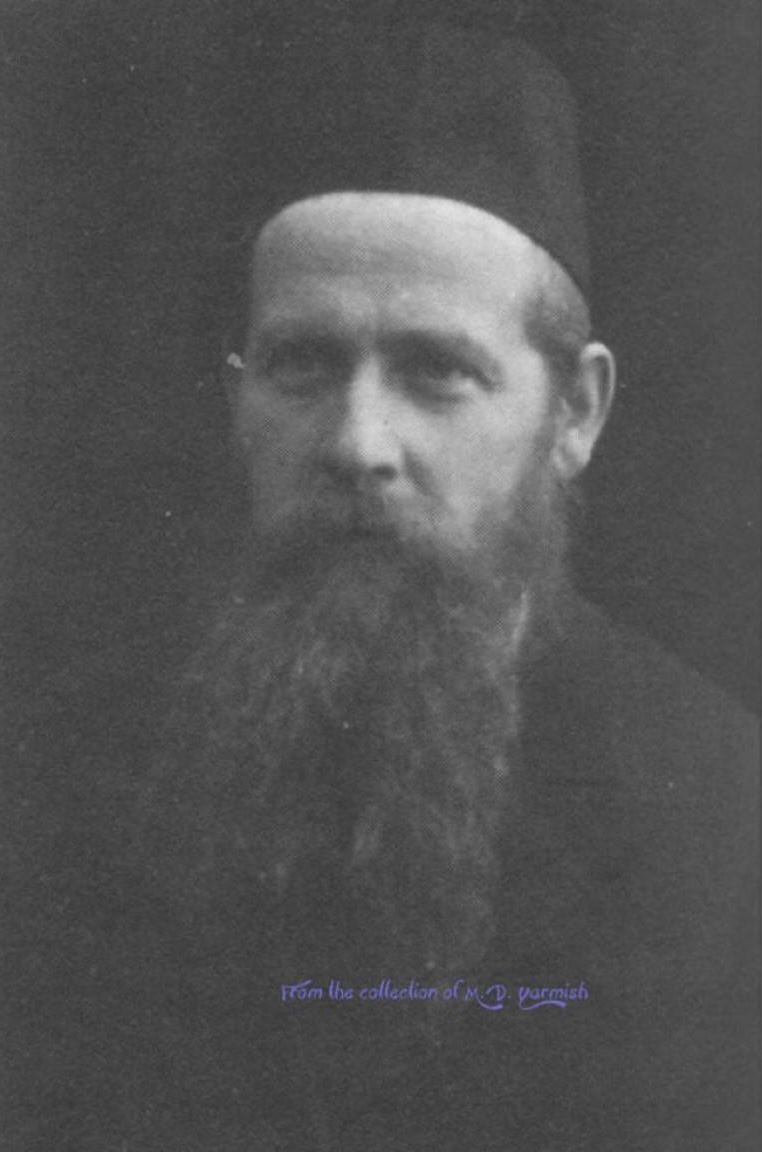

Avraham Yoffen (or Jofen; 1887 - April 19, 1970), also known as "Avraham Pinsker" was a rabbi, son-in-law to Yosef Yozel Horowitz, the Alter of Novardok and director of Novardok Yeshiva. He fled to the U.S. at the outbreak of World War II and opened a yeshiva in Borough Park. In 1962 he moved to and founded a kollel in Jerusalem.

== Bais Yosef yeshiva ==
Yoffen supervised a network of satellite yeshivas in pre-World War II Poland and Ukraine, all named Yeshiva Bais Yosef. He used this name for the yeshiva he founded in Borough Park.

In Europe, for a while, Yoffen had the assistance of Rabbi Gershon Liebman.

== Biography ==
Yoffen was arrested by the Russian government in 1921, along with some of his students. Two years later he went back to Poland.

He was buried on Har HaMenuchot among numerous famous rabbis.

=== Notable students ===
- Yaakov Yisrael Kanievsky, the Steipler
- Zvi Aryeh Rosenfeld, Breslov mashpia (spiritual mentor) in America, who was a chavrusa of the son of the rosh yeshiva, Rav Yaakov Yoffen, and was one of only five students to receive Semichah directly from Rav Yoffen after completing Shas twice at age 23.
