= Yaakov Galinsky =

Rabbi

Rabbi Yaakov Galinsky יעקב גלינסקי
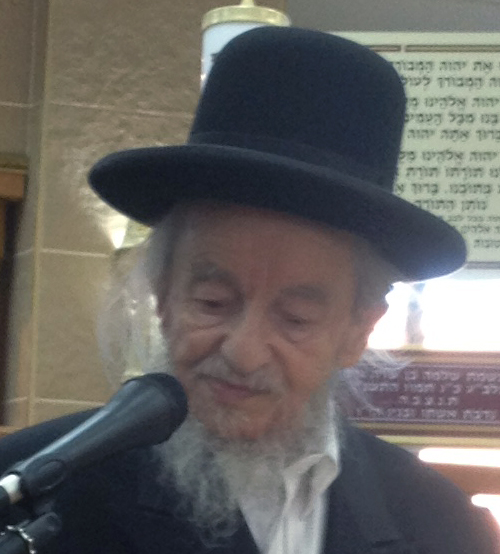

Personal life
- Born: 8 January 1921 Krynki, Poland
- Died: 23 January 2014 (aged 93) Bnei Brak, Israel
- Parent: Avraham Tzvi (father)
- Education: Navordok Yeshiva

Religious life
- Religion: Judaism
- Yeshiva: Yeshivas Chadera

Rabbi Yaakov Yitzchak Galinsky (Hebrew: יעקב יצחק גלינסקי; 8 January 1921 - 23 January 2014) was described as "a scion of Yeshivas Novardok in Bialystok, and one of the last maggidim remaining in our generation."

Galinsky, described as "diminutive in stature but towering in personality ... kept crowds enthralled" was once told that since so many people are dreaming of the future, his job as Maggid (in his travels to "immigrant communities throughout Eretz Yisroel") should not be to give them Mussar but rather to wake them up, and each will do his part.

== Biography ==
He was born "5681/1921 in Krinek, Poland" to Devorah and Rabbi Avraham Tzvi Galinsky.

Galinsky's first yeshiva, Yeshivas Novardok in Bialystok, had only "a few shelves" of reference texts, so people waited in line and, while waiting, sharpened their understanding.

In 1939, with others of the yeshiva, he fled but was captured by Russia and exiled to Siberia. Upon release he "traveled to Zambul, Kazakhstan, in Eastern Russia" and helped found a Jewish school in which he taught.

He married Tzivia Brod, a daughter of a Breslover Chassid; in 1949, they came to Israel, where Galinsky helped found a yeshiva.

Upon his passing, 15 days after his 93rd birthday, his survivors included "children, grandchildren, great-grandchildren and great-great grandchildren."

== Published works ==
- Vehigadeta - a series of works available in the original Hebrew and also English translation.
- Lehaggid
