= Yaakov Yisrael Kanievsky =

Haredi rabbi and leader in Israel

Rabbi Yaakov Yisrael Kanievsky

Personal life
- Born: Yaakov Yisrael Kanievsky יעקב ישראל קַנִיֶּבְסְקִי; 1899 Hornostaypil, Ukraine
- Died: 10 August 1985 (aged 85–86) Bnei Brak, Israel
- Buried: Shomrei Shabbos cemetery, Bnei Brak
- Spouse: (Pesaha) Miriam Karelitz
- Children: Chaim Kanievsky
- Parent(s): Chaim Peretz and Bracha Kanievsky

Religious life
- Religion: Judaism

Yaakov Yisrael Kanievsky (Hebrew: יעקב ישראל קַנִיֶּבְסְקִי), known as The Steipler or The Steipler Gaon (1899 – 10 August 1985), was a Haredi (ultra-Orthodox Jewish) rabbi, Talmudic scholar, and posek (decider of Jewish law in new situations), and the author of Kehilos Yaakov, a 19-volume commentary on the Talmud.

== Biography ==
=== Early years ===
Kanievsky was born in Hornostaypil, Ukraine to Chaim Peretz Kanievsky, a rabbi, and his wife Bracha.

Kanievsky studied in the Novardok Yeshiva.

=== Later years ===
After serving in the Red Army for some time, during which he was bullied for his strict adherence to mitzvot, Kanievsky managed to get discharged. He decided to move to Białystok in Poland, in order to continue learning Torah unhindered from Communist interference. There, he studied under Avraham Yoffen and published Sha'arei Tevunah (Gates of Understanding), his first major work.

Kanievsky married Pesha Miriam Karelitz, the sister of Avrohom Yeshaya Karelitz (known as the Chazon Ish). Kanievsky was then appointed Rosh Yeshiva (dean) of the Novarodok yeshiva in Pinsk.

==== The Land of Israel ====
In 1934, at the urging of his brother-in-law, the Chazon Ish, he left Poland and moved to Israel, settling in Bnei Brak, and was appointed Rosh Yeshiva of Yeshivas Beis Yosef - Novardok in Bnei Brak.

He died on Friday night, 23 Av, 5745 (1985), and over 150,000 mourners attended his funeral. His son Chaim Kanievsky was also a rabbi.

He was considered to be gadol ha-dor, "the greatest authority of the generation", by many followers of Haredi Judaism.

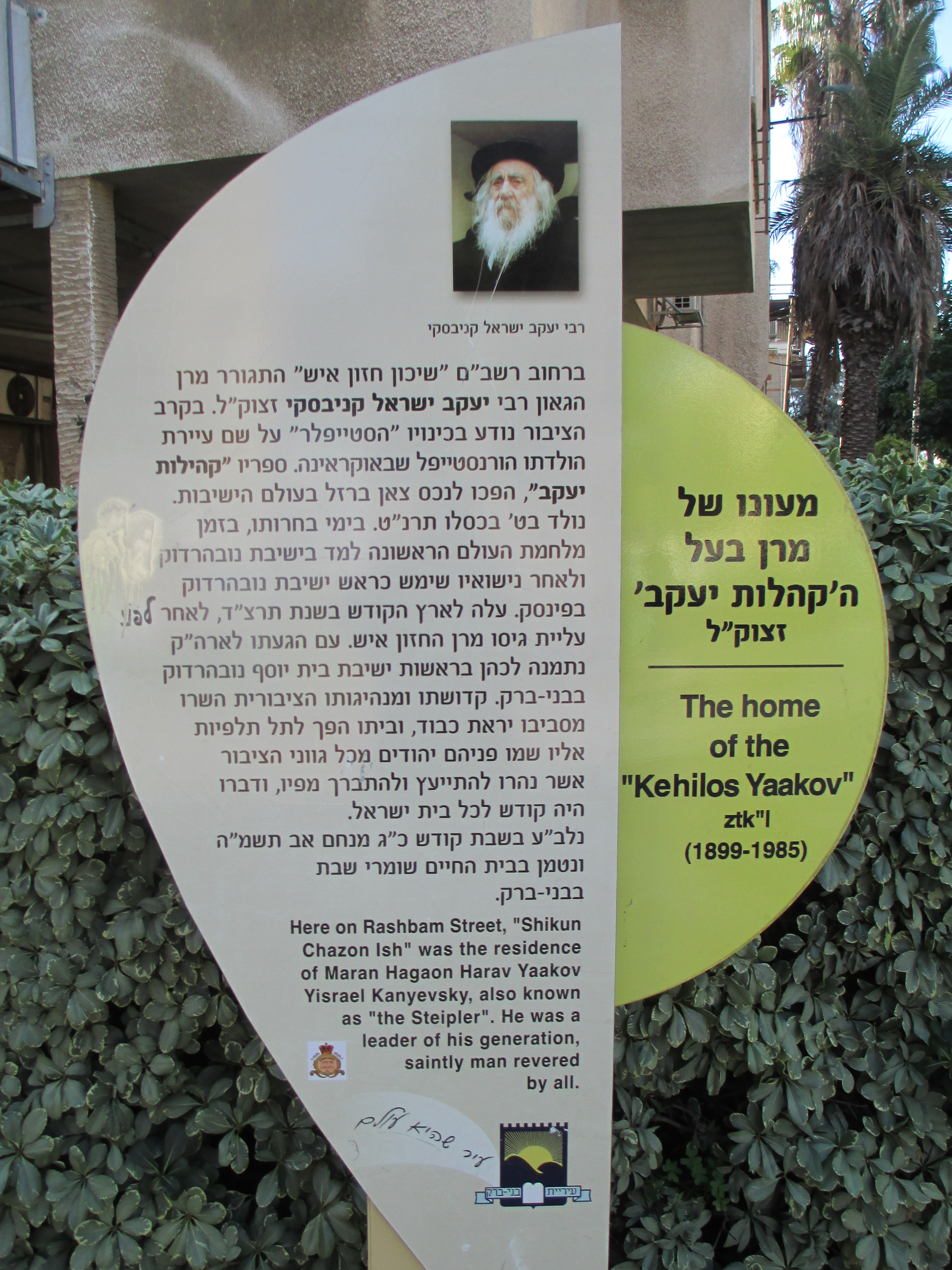
A memorial plaque for Kanievski on Rashbam Street in Bnei Brak

== Political involvement ==
Kanievsky believed the Yom Kippur War was intentionally started as a means of Herut gaining political popularity.

Kanievsky strongly criticized the Poalei Agudat Yisrael party, calling it "of the parties who damage in the vineyard of the House of the Lord", and added: "When we be granted the salvation, this party will be on the side of those who ruin and destroy religion." On the leaders of the party, he wrote that they "corrupted and turned it into a distinct-materialistic party ... and they put venom of "אשר קרך" into their ranks"; and on its voters, he wrote that they "violate the name of God in secret and in multitude".

In the 1984 elections, he supported Shas.

== Works ==
He also authored Birkas Peretz (on the Torah) and Chayei Olam.
