= Jews and Judaism in Siberia =

The region of Siberia has been home to Jews since the late 18th century, although Jewish communities did not exist in large part until after 1861, when Tsar Alexander II lifted the restrictions of his father, Tsar Nikolai I regarding Jews in the Pale of Settlement.

== Background ==
After the Second Partition of Poland in 1793, and the subsequent rebellion by Tadeusz Kościuszko in 1794, and a final Third Partition of Poland in 1795, the Russian Empire had inherited a huge amount of Jews that had lived in the Polish–Lithuanian Commonwealth due to its lax and limited restrictions on Jews. For example, Jews could serve in the Great Sejm, the Polish–Lithuanian parliament.

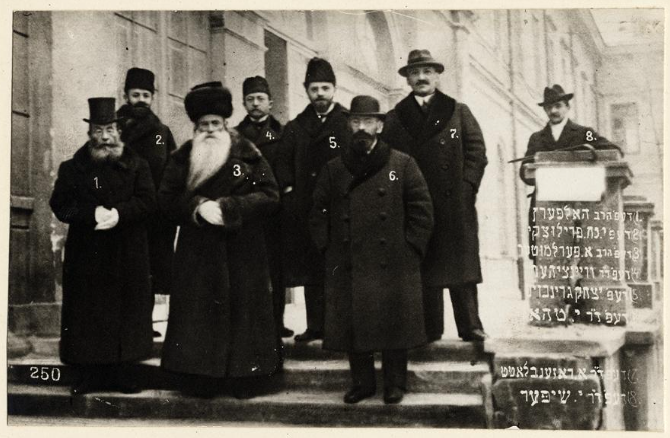
Jewish representatives to the Sejm (parliament), Poland, ca. 1920: Rabbi Moszek Eli Halpern, Noah Pryłucki, Avraham Tsevi Perlmutter, Dr. Berek Wajncier, Yitsḥak Grünbaum, Osjasz Thon, Uri (Jerzy) Rosenblatt, Ignacy Schiper.

This freedom and autonomy would not be reinforced by the Russian Empire. Queen Catherine II had numerous requests from different parts of society about what to do with the Jews. The Orthodox Church wanted her to expel them, while Baltic merchants who had worked with Jews for centuries under Poland asked her to let them stay. Catherine II allowed Jews to remain in the Empire, but imposed numerous restrictions on them and forced them into cramped ghettos called shtetls. Under her heir, Alexander I, the Pale of Settlement was expanded to include the newly conquered areas from the Ottoman Empire, where Jews could act like colonialists and settle the nearly uninhabited Ukrainian east, including modern day Donetsk, Luhansk, and in general what was known as Novorossiya.

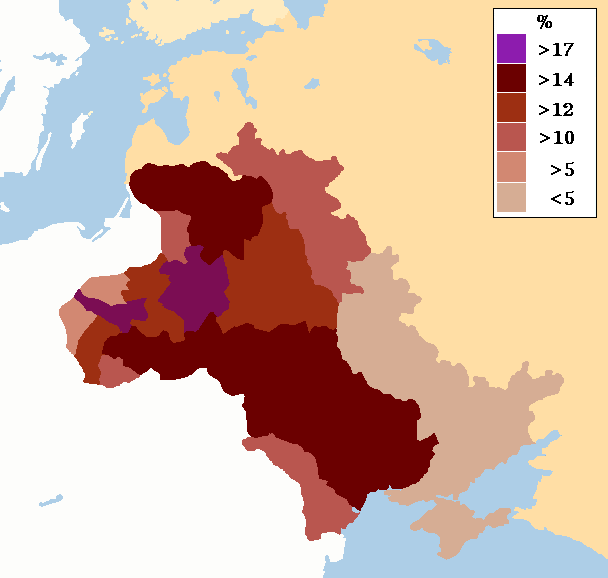
Map showing percentage of Jews in the Pale of Settlement and Congress Poland, c. 1905

Tsar Nikolay I, who succeeded Alexander I, began a long campaign of Russification, which was the act of getting Non-Russians to become Russian, through religious conversion to Russian Orthodoxy and through the erasure of local culture and language. One way that he tried to do this was to enlist young Jewish boys, sometimes as young as 5–10 years old into the Cantonists. The Jews were forbidden from speaking Yiddish or Hebrew, and were forced to convert to Christianity, if they wanted to become officers. He also passed a law not allowing Jews to live 53 kilometers next to the Prussian and Austrian borders. This law was later amended and then scrapped by Nikolay I. In reality, his policies of Russification were considered a failure. Sergey Uvarov, an imperial statesman, noted that the Jews were an ancient civilization, that had been brought down due to centuries of persecution. However, he realized that it was impossible to destroy Jews and Judaism, and the only way to "solve the Jewish Question" was to educate them, and to promote Jews getting higher education. Uvarov's reforms opened up a huge debate within the Jewish community between the more conservative Hassidim were against these reforms while the more Western Maskilim were for these reforms. In short, Nikolay's plans to russify Jews and destroy the Jewish culture and religion failed and his successor would understand.

Alexander II, Nikolay's son, turned out to be a reformer, as opposed to his father. He abolished the Cantonist system, thus ending conscription for Jewish boys. He allowed Jews to enter high schools and universities, reversing his father's ruling.

More importantly, on November 27, 1861, Alexander opened the rest of Russia for some specific groups of Jews. Jewish scholars, university graduates, merchants, artisans, and manufacturers, were all granted the ability to live in the interior parts of Russia, creating flourishing Jewish communities in Moscow, Petersburg, Yekaterinburg, Volgograd, and even in Siberia.

== Jewish convicts ==
Even prior to the 1861 decree, Jews had already been living in Siberia, mostly as convicts sent there among Russians. The first Jewish convicts sent there were those captured from the Third Partition of Poland. Omsk, Tomsk, Tobolsk, Kainsk, and Nizhneudinsk were recorded having Jewish convict populations.

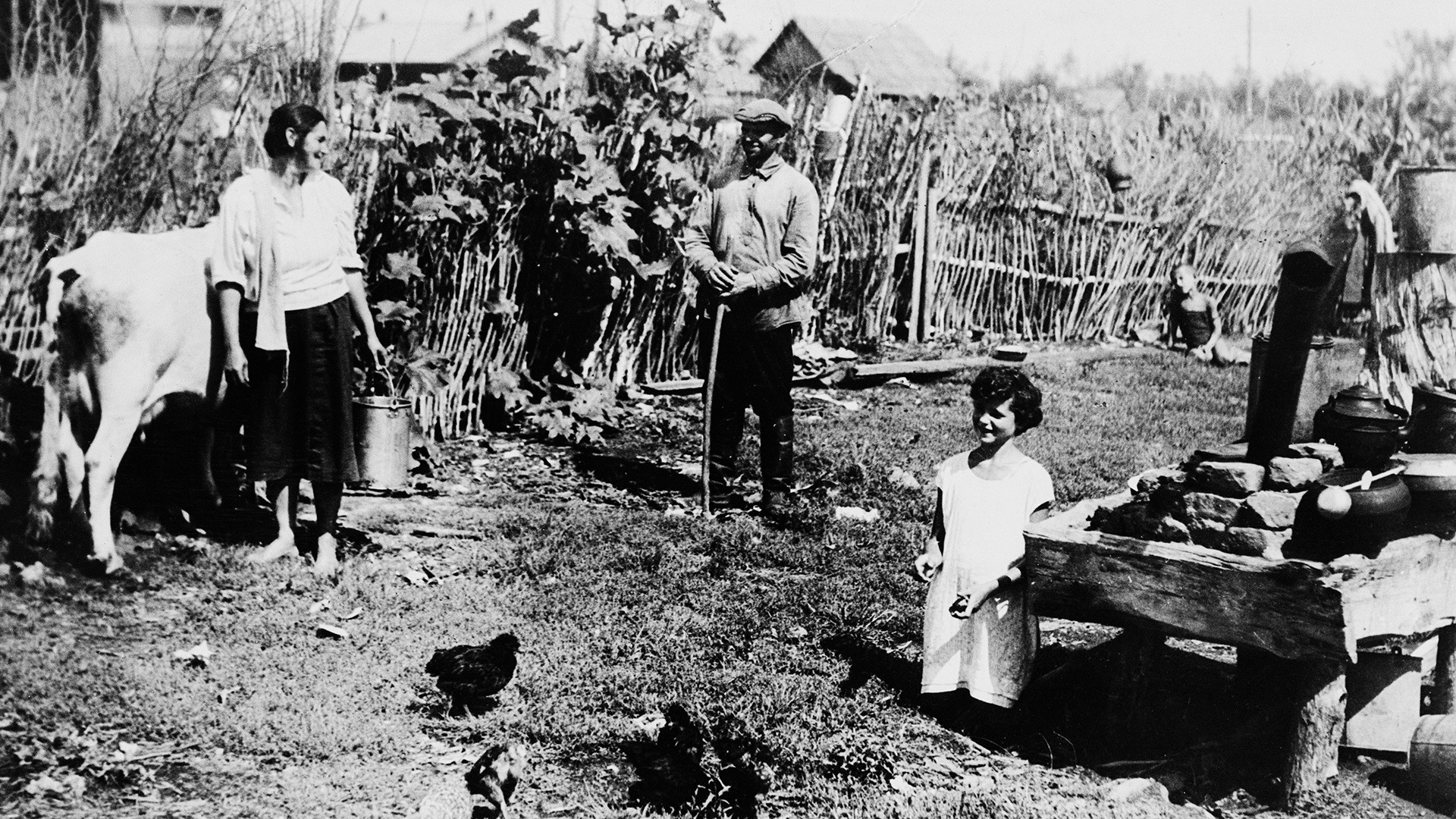
Jews in Birobidzhan, Siberia in the 1930s

The next Jews to arrive were Jewish soldiers who were fighting in the Russo-Japanese War in 1905. One of these Jews was Joseph Trumpeldor, who went on to fight in World War One, and in the Battle of Tel Hai, where he would ultimately perish.

== The Jewish Autonomous Oblast ==
The Jewish Autonomous Oblast was created in 1928 by Joseph Stalin, mostly as a place where Jews could be watched by Stalin and his advisors. Tens of thousands of poor Jews made this move in order to escape their extreme poverty. Many were promised good opportunities to gain status and wealth through forestry, logging, and fishing on the Amur River.

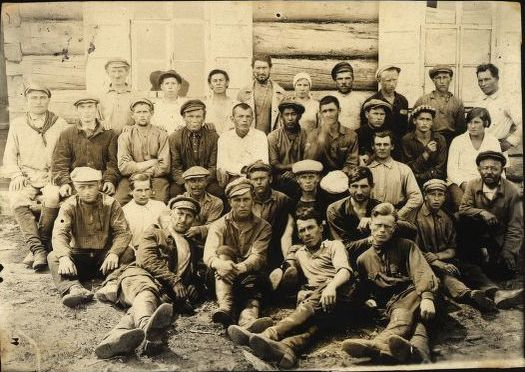
Group of Jewish workers on the Stalinfeldsky grain collective

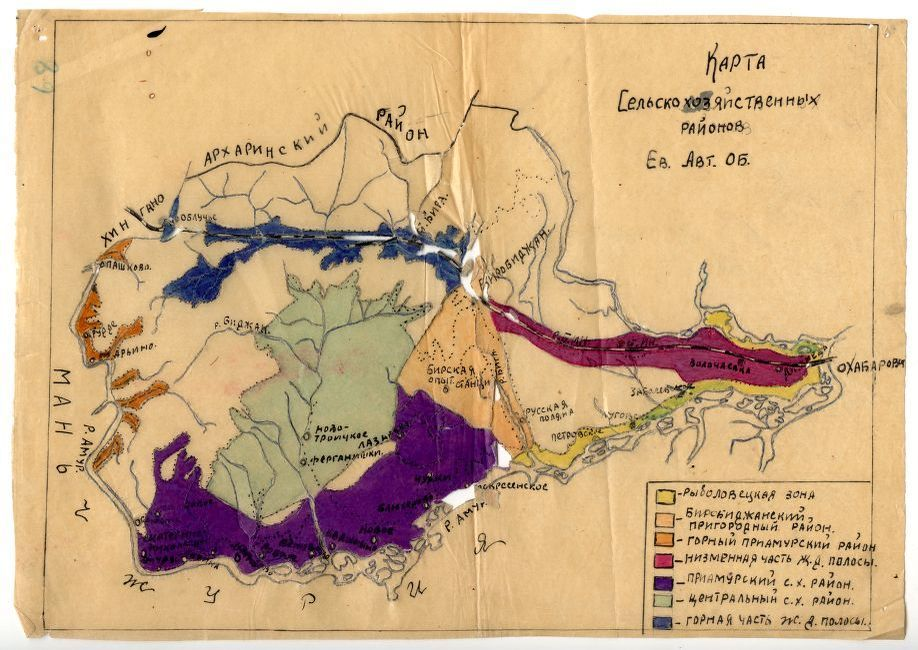
Birobidzhan agriculture map

The plan was not very successful. Jewish migration was limited, as many had their eyes set first on Mandatory Palestine and then Israel. The region was also very boring, with people joking about how the most common cinema in the region was watching the pots boil.

=== Creation of the Jewish Autonomous Oblast ===
The creation of the Jewish Autonomous Region in 1928 grew out of long standing economic and social concerns around the role of Jews in the Soviet Union. In 1934, the region was upgraded to become a full Jewish Autonomous Oblast (JAO).

==== Stalin and the "Jewish Question" ====
Early Soviet leaders have a decidedly mixed history with antisemitism. While many of the early revolutionaries were Jewish, major players within the party had an antisemitic bias, including Stalin himself. Stalin wrote in his youth that Jews were characterized not by religion, as many at the time saw it, but from their shared origins. This set him apart in his view that Jews constituted a different, if not wholly unnatural, race. Stalin's secretary, Boris Bazhanov, wrote that Stalin was clearly anti-semitic, not shying away from using slurs to describe Jewish members of the party, while maintaining a façade of support for Jews:

I wondered how Stalin, being anti-semitic, could have two Jewish secretaries: Mekhlis and Kanner . I soon discovered that they had been originally employed for camouflage purposes. During the Civil War Stalin had led a group of partisans who detested Trotsky, his deputy Skliansky, and their assistants: the jews of the army commissariat. This caused suspicions in the party leadership that Stalin was anti-semitic. When he returned to civilian life, he wanted to dispel these suspicions and so he took on Kanner and Mekhlis - first in 1921-22 when he was nominal head of the Workers and Peasants Inspection Commissariat, then as his personal secretaries in the Central Committee secretariat.

Stalin also threw the Jewish film director Alexei Kapler in the Gulag after he struck up a relationship with Stalin's daughter, Svetlana. When Svetlana later married a Jewish law student, Grigory Morizov, Stalin dissolved the marriage.

==== Formation of a Jewish national region ====
In 1918, the Jewish Commissariat was established, marking the Jews as an official national minority. This, along with the creation of the Jewish Anti-Fascist Committee, which although not technically run by a Jew included many important Jewish figures, gave Jews in the Soviet Union a space where they could discuss the treatment of their people, in the light of the increasing threat of fascism. With their status as an official ethnic group, some started to consider the possibility of their own region like those afforded to the other ethnic minorities of the Soviet Union.

The concern for a Jewish autonomous homeland of sort had been circulating widely in response to the violence being witnessed in Europe during WWII. Zionism picked up large followings in the US and Britain, a phenomenon that the Jewish Anti-Fascist Committee reported to Stalin. This development spurred on plans for a Soviet alternative. There were a couple of options discussed for this region, including part of Ukraine, Crimea, and lastly the Russian Far East. Of these options, Crimea was by far the most popular among members of the Jewish Anti-Fascist Committee and the intellectuals settled there, and they submitted a proposal for it to Stalin, citing the large Jewish presence in the region and existing successful Jewish collective farms there. The Crimea however presented an issue for Stalin.

As it was also the original homeland of the Crimean Tatars, Stalin was concerned that making Crimea a Jewish Autonomous region would create ethnic conflict. He instead eventually approved a plan to settle Jews in part of the Russian Far East region of Khabarovsk Krai. This area along the Amur River had another big benefit for Stalin – moving the Jews out of the Pale of Settlement cities such as Kiev and Odessa, where he feared their large numbers. By giving the Jews their own region about the size of Belgium, the Soviets hoped to turn the lowest class and rural Jews in productive workers by emphasizing a Yiddish society heavily built on the ideals of socialism. While some Jews supported the creation of the Jewish Autonomous Oblast, others were much more skeptical and outright hostile to the proposal. Israel Emiot, a prominent Jewish poet in the Soviet Union recalled that once when discussing Birobidzhan with his contemporaries, the famous Jewish journalist Ilya Ehrenburg yelled at them, "You people are trying to create a new ghetto!" Ehrenburg's outburst highlights the major concern held amongst Jewish opponents of the Jewish Autonomous Oblast, namely, that in facilitating the movement of all Soviet Jewry into one region (especially off in the remote Russian Far East) they would be easy prey for oppression, or even mass murder, as witnessed during the pogroms, and later the Holocaust.

==== Early migration and growth ====
The region of Birobidzhan was occupied mainly by Russians, Cossacks, and Koreans, as well as the local indigenous groups. The influx of Jewish settlers started in 1928. In keeping with the push for greater collective farming, the first settlers to arrive in Birobidzhan were expected to work the land and become like Russian peasants. The following text summarized from the Komzet meeting on September 15, 1928, reveals the story of the first group to arrive:

“[A]bout 125 of the 643 jews to arrive in Birobidzhan by late summer 1928 were directed to rice plantations located along the Amur River…[which] had been cultivate by either Koreans or Cossacks who inhabited the region before the decision to promote Jewish land settlement… Conditions on the plantations were harsh and primitive; due to short notice given to the personnel at the plantations, they were ill-prepared to handle the influx of several dozen new settlers, many of whom had to sleep out-of-doors until tents arrived from Khabarovsk and barracks had been erected. The closest medical facilities were located some twenty miles away and lacked even basic medical equipment and supplies.”

According to the population figures of the settlers to Birobidzhan taken in 1929 and 1931, approximately 2,5000 of 3,000 families were unskilled settlers from the Shtetl communities of the Pale of Settlement, and of the workers surveyed by the Komzet, 49% of the settlers had no job skills before their migration to Birobidzhan. The rest of the population was engaged in construction, service, or government bureaucracy for the growing region. After 1931, the Soviet strategy shifted to focus more on manufacturing and industry in the region. The Second Five Year Plan (1933) envisioned only twenty-six percent of settlers involved in agriculture. The demographics of the settlers were changing too around that time. For one thing, they were not all Jewish, and second, more and more settlers were already involved in agriculture or industry before immigrating to Birobidzhan. By 1939, Jews represented only 17,695 of the 109,000 residents in the JAO and mostly lived in cities and towns – much fewer than the government had hoped. This was the consequence of the last two Five-Year-Plans, which saw many non-Jews arrive in Birobidzhan, while some of the original Jewish settlers left to settle elsewhere in the Russian Far East.

==== The purges ====
Birobidzhan went through two major cycles of purges. The first lasted from 1937-1938 during Stalin’s Great Purge and saw both foreign immigrants and many of the original settlers of Birobidzhan arrested and killed. In one particularly ethnically coded incident, the wife of the local Communist Party in Birobidzhan was accused of plotting to poison Lazar Kaganovich, a high ranking Jewish communist, with Gelfilte fish (traditional Jewish jellied fish ball) that she had served him for dinner. According to Israel Emiot, the first purge contributed to the lack of enthusiasm by the displaced Polish, Belarusian, and Ukrainian Jews to move to Birobidzhan during the Second World War.

The second cycle of purges in the latter half of the 1940s is more known than the first, given the public figures arrested, as well as the fact that more of them survived to tell the tale. These arrests mostly sprung from the increasing Sovietization, from which all ideas of Zionism or Jewish nationalism became anti-Soviet. Emiot, a well-respected Polish Jewish journalist and editor of the Birobidzhan Star (the region's Yiddish newspaper), was one of these survivors. He was arrested in – on the charges of Jewish nationalism (an anti-Soviet crime), belonging to an illegal group, and espionage – a fate shared by his contemporaries on the Jewish Anti-fascist Committee and other prominent members of the Birobidzhan community. Emiot wrote of his experience in prison and later the Gulag. His interrogator at the Khabarovsk NKVD prison tortured him and left him in solitary confinement, leading Emiot to stage both a hunger strike and to attempt suicide before finally being transferred to a different interrogator. A favorite saying of this interrogator came from the Nazi Alfred Rosenberg, “Jews have two Fatherlands, Palestine and Birobidzhan!” Emiot was tried in absentia, and though the charges of espionage was dropped, he was sentenced to ten years of hard labor for the nationalism charge. During his time in prison and the Gulag, Emiot was surrounded by people from all walks of life, Russian crime bosses, former Japanese Generals, German soldiers and collaborators, and even some of his old friends from Birobidzhan. In one small moment of happiness in the Gulag, the group of Jewish inmates copied a work of the famed Yiddish writer Sholem Aleichem:

"The joy this manuscript brought to the Jews in the camp is indescribable. It was the first Yiddish book we had seen in years. The copy passed from hand to hand. I remember how the writer Gertz-Movshowitz forgot all about the heart condition that was keeping him chained to a bed. Unable to contain himself until the copy could be brought to him, he put on his clothes and walked all the way to Broderson's barracks to look at the printed Yiddish words with his own eyes. Enslaved Jews read Sholem Aleichem's words and laughed through their tears."

Emiot was eventually released early, along with other political prisoners after Stalin’s death. Returning to Birobidzhan in 1956, he found the city had changed quite a lot. Many Jews had been arrested as he was, or had fled to Israel, leaving little remaining overt Jewish culture. Yet the city itself had seen improvements including many new buildings and paved roads. Emiot eventually followed the path of immigration that many others had taken before him and immigrated to the United States. Of the future settlement of Jews in Birobidzhan, he had little hope proclaiming, "The Jews in the Soviet Union know better."

==== Aftermath of the Purges ====
The purges had created a lot of fear for the remaining Jews in Birobidzhan. Emiot’s first landlady after his release in 1956, told him that she even feared to answer her daughter’s letters from Israel. As such, after the purges, Jewish settlement in the Jewish Autonomous Oblast was essentially over even though sometimes there were renewed calls to do so. Instead, the region saw an exodos of its Jewish population, with many immigrating to Israel and the United States when given the chance. Of those who immigrated to Israel, few ever moved back to Birobidzhan. In a 1958 speech, Nikita Khruskchev claimed that Birobidzhan failed because the Jews were unwilling to work, a claim that was evidently not true.

Nowadays, the region is hardly Jewish. Roughly 0.6% of the region was Jewish in 2021. Most Jews have left to Israel, the United States of America, Britain, and France. The small community of Jews left in the region are supported by Jewish groups, such as the Joint Distribution Committee and Chabad. There have also been efforts to restore Yiddish literacy though summer camps and university courses in the region.

=== Jewish culture in the Jewish Autonomous Oblast ===
==== Early Yiddish culture ====
The Soviets aimed to create a socialist Yiddish inspired utopia in Birobidzhan. They were helped in the endeavor by the support of the Yiddish intelligentsia many of whom supported the Jewish Autonomous Oblast in some capacity either in the Jewish Anti-fascist Committee, or as later visitors and settlers in the region. Many of these writers had already lived in Jewish communities in the Pale of Settlement and the collective farms of Crimea. Examples include Solomon Mikholes, Itsik Fefer, Israel Emiot, David Bergelson, and Moishe Broderson.

Yiddish was declared one of the official languages of the Jewish Autonomous Oblast. It could be heard used on the streets by settlers in the 1920s until around 1936. A Yiddish newspaper, the Birobidzhan Star (also sometimes referred to as the Birobidzhan Stern) was set up. Birobidzhan was also home to one of the first Yiddish theater troops in the Soviet Union, a marker of Jews equal status to the other ethnic minorities who all had similar institutions. The Soviets also promised to allow the opening of schools to teach Yiddish. This promise was fulfilled until the crackdown in 1936 and resulted in functioning Yiddish programs for elementary and middle school students.

Birobidzhan became a source of Jewish and Yiddish cultural inspiration in the first few decades of its creation. Itsik Fefer, a famous Yiddish poet who was part of the delegation that represented the Jewish Anti-Fascist Committee in the US, wrote the following poem, "Wedding in Birobidzhan". Marc Chagall made an illustration based on the poem in 1944.

Long and groaning tables, decked in linen white and pure.

Juicy ducks from Valdheym and fish from Amur.

It wasn't just the ducklings and surly not the goose,

It really was the biro people --- the Birobidzhan Jews.

Poultry stuffed to bursting point, livers chopped in fat,

The tables staggered with the load of everything they had.

Cakes well-soaked in honey—strudel with "kishmish"—

To say nothing of that truly Jewish and – gefilte fish.

Yiddish culture was also critical to the perception of the Jewish Autonomous Oblast. In Soviet propaganda posters from the 1930s created by Jewish artists, Birobidzhan is linked with classic Jewish experiences and themes. Examples of some of the works are the titles "Exodus from Germany", "Moshe and the Burning Bush", and "Milk and Honey" which link Birobidzhan with the ideals of its Jewish roots and portray it as a safe heaven and utopia.

==== Seekers of Happiness (1936) ====
The film Seekers of Happiness was released in 1936 and followed the story of a Jewish family immigrating to Birobidzhan. Vladimir Korsh-Sablin directed the film, and among its cast were actors from the Yiddish Theater. The film explores how they adjust to the collective farm and settle into their new rich homeland, celebrating Birobidzhan as an ideal utopia for Jews from all over the Soviet Union and the world.

As a Soviet propaganda film, it focuses on two main elements. First, it portrays the Jewish Autonomous Oblast as a place of great riches, showing productive collective farms with plenty of wheat and cattle, as well as a river full of fish. Although the JAO is clearly still a work in progress, the film depicts the building of skyscrapers, a sign of advancement and potential. At the end of the film, the matriarch of the family cries as she gratefully recounts how her life has changed for the better since they arrived in Birobidzhan, including the fact that they now have food.

The movie also emphasizes the glorification of working for the collective rather than the self. One of the family, Pinya, portrays a classic Jewish stereotype, a self-absorbed man obsessed with money, and overall the prospect of finding gold on the collective farm. Pinya refuses to work in the collective and neglects his duty, instead going to pan for gold. To protect his gold, he even assaults his own family member, beating him with a shovel. Pinya's crime is discovered, as is the fact that his supposed gold is not real. Pinya is last seen having his information taken down by the authorities to face the consequences of his selfish actions. This stands in stark contrast to the rest of his family, who through their integration in the collective farm find contentment and even love. Rose falls in love with a local Russian fisherman. Though the match is not approved at first by her aunt (the only outright mention of ethnic tension in the movie), their match is eventually approved, and they marry to the happy tears of her aunt and celebration of their collective.

==== Post-Stalin Era ====
Jewish and Yiddish culture in the Jewish Autonomous Oblast suffered significantly under Stalin to an extent that it never recovered. The purges of the late 1930s and 1940s resulted in the deaths of many of the leading Jewish figures in the region. Among those arrested were members of the intelligentsia – Yiddish thinkers, writers, poets, and journalists – who had been essential to creating the vibrant Yiddish culture in the region to begin with. Of those who survived the purges, many did not stay in Birobidzhan. Thus, Jews remained a small minority of the inhabitants of the Jewish Autonomous Oblast and continued to shrink in population. This coincided with the general policy of Russification that became the basis of the push for a shared Soviet culture. Pushed by Stalin and his successors, this policy shifted from the former celebrations of ethnic diversity that characterized the early Soviet Union, to a view of one united Soviet identity.

As a result, both Yiddish secular culture and Jewish religious culture suffered. Emiot was saddened upon arriving back in Birobidzhan in 1956 and finding that his beloved newspaper the Birobidzhan Star was no longer publishing Yiddish work, and only sometimes Yiddish translations of other Soviet writers. The Israeli Ambassador who visited Birobidzhan that same year was struck by the lack of Yiddish education at all levels. In fact, by the end of the 1960s, higher education was much harder to come by for Jews in Birobidzhan and they suffered eight times lower average levels of higher education than other Soviet Jews. The younger Jewish generations of that time tended to prefer speaking in Russian, and some never even learned Yiddish. Yiddish language suffered not only because of the closure of school programs, but because the demographics of Birobidzhan did not support it. Jews had always been a minority in the region, but at least all residents could be exposed to Yiddish in the schools. However, with the closure of these programs and the ever-decreasing Jewish population, Russian officially dominated. The bookstores no longer sold Yiddish texts, having only one of two copies of Sholem Aleichem if one was lucky. Even the Yiddish theater closed and was replaced by a Russian one.

Religious culture also suffered heavily. The Soviets had never intended for Judaism to flourish in Birobidzhan and preferred to support secular Yiddish culture, in line with the soviet anti-religion policies. With many of the residents left in Birobidzhan being of the younger or working generations, they were more likely to subscribe to socialist ideals about religion and did not keep their Jewish faith. In 1956, the synagogue of Birobidzhan suffered a great fire and was destroyed. That being said, the number of congregants was small. In the 1950s and 1960s the congregation reportedly consisted of mostly the older generation and generally no more than 20–30 participants except during the High Holidays. In the 21st century, the synagogue was rebuilt and serves the small remaining Jewish population of Birobidzhan. In 2020, Chabad Lubavitch sent one of their rabbis from Kharkiv to Birobidzhan, replacing the former local rabbi.

== Current ==
The city in Siberia which has the largest number of Jews today is Tomsk, with a Jewish population of 4,000 people. Rabbi Levi Kaminetsky arrived in the town in 2004 and revived the almost ruined synagogue. He also helps revitalize the local Jewish community although he notes that most Jews here have a Jewish mother, but non-Jewish father. According to halacha, this makes them Jewish.

Only roughly 837 ethnic Jews reside in the Jewish Autonomous Oblast as of 2021. Most modern commentators note that Joseph Stalin's efforts to establish a second Jewish homeland failed.
