= Nachman Kahana =

Israeli rabbi (born 1937)

Rabbi Nachman Kahana
- Title: Rabbi

Personal life
- Born: 1937 (age 88–89) Brooklyn, New York
- Education: Novardok Yeshiva
- Occupation: Rabbi

Religious life
- Religion: Judaism
- Residence: Jerusalem, Israel
- Semikhah: Novardok Yeshiva
- Website: www.nachmankahana.com

Nachman Kahana (also spelled Kahane) (Hebrew: רב נחמן בן רב יחזקאל שרגא כהנא) is an Israeli rabbi.

== Biography ==
Kahana was born in 1937 and raised in Brooklyn, New York, where he attended a branch of the Novardok Yeshiva, where he was ordained. His father was Rabbi Yechezkel (Charles) Shraga Kahane, and his brother was Rabbi Meir Kahane, the founder of the Jewish Defense League and Kach.

== Career ==
He worked as a civil servant in Israel's Ministry of Religious Affairs and has also led the Birkat Kohanim Institute, which has attempted to establish a database of reliable Kohanim in Israel. He is the founder of the Center for Kohanim.

He is currently the spiritual leader of Hazon Yichezkeil a member synagogue of Young Israel (Yisrael Hatzair) in the Old City of Jerusalem. Additionally he has founded the Institute for Talmudic Commentaries (המכון להסברת מפרשי התלמוד) through which he has published "Mei Menuchot" (מי מנוחות - Restful Waters) a Hebrew elucidation of the Tosafot commentary on several tractates of the Talmud. He has also been cited as collaborating on the recent and controversial attempts to resurrect the ancient Sanhedrin in the capacity of Av Beit Din (אב בית דין - Father of the Court House), which is the second in command to the Rosh HaYeshiva / Nasi ( נשיא/ראש הישיבה - Head of the Yeshiva/Prince). He has created a database of reliable Kohanim in Israel.

== Writings ==
- "Mei Menuchot" (מי מנוחות - Restful Waters) a Hebrew elucidation of the Tosafot commentary on several tractates of the Talmud.
- "With All Your Might" based on Rabbi Kahana's weekly parasha and holiday messages of the past several years.
