= Civilian internee =

Detained civilian by a war belligerent

A civilian internee is a civilian detained by a belligerent to a war for security reasons. Internees are usually forced to reside in internment camps. Historical examples include internment of Japanese and German Americans in the United States during World War II. Japan also interned 130,000 Dutch, British, and American civilians in Asia during World War II.

== Internment of civilians by the Japanese during World War II ==
Number and location of civilians interned by Japan
Country of internment	Number of Internees	Internee deaths	Death rate	Most common nationality
Japan	690	32	4.6%	British
China	9,350	250	2.6%	British
Hong Kong	2,535	127	5.0%	British
Philippines	7,800	453	5.8%	Americans
Malaya and Singapore	4,525	218	4.8%	British
Dutch East Indies (Indonesia)	105,530	13,567	12.8%	Dutch
Indochina, Thailand, Burma	465	>10	?	?
Total	130,895	14,657	11.2%

From December 1941 to April 1942 in World War II, Japan conquered much of Southeast Asia and the Pacific region. In doing so, Japan acquired colonies of the United Kingdom, Netherlands, and the United States. Tens of thousands of non-combatant civilians of countries at war with Japan resided in those territories. Japan interned most of the civilians in makeshift camps located throughout the region and in China and Japan. Many of the civilians were interned for more than three years from early 1942 until the end of the war in 1945.

In general, civilian internees of the Japanese were treated less harshly than were prisoners of war (POWs). Japan's Ministry of Foreign Affairs administered the internee camps while the Ministry of War administered the POW camps. The Japanese left the internal administration of the camps mostly in internee hands, providing only small amounts of food, fuel, and other necessities to the internees. As the fortunes of war turned against Japan, conditions for internees worsened and by the end of the war starvation threatened in many camps. The self-rule, self-sufficiency, and cooperation of the internees permitted the Japanese to control internee camps with a minimum of resources and personnel, amounting at times to only 17 administrators and 8 guards for more than 3,000 internees at Santo Tomas Internment Camp in the Philippines.

Conditions for internees were worst in the Dutch East Indies (now Indonesia) where large numbers of widely dispersed internees, mostly Dutch, overwhelmed Japanese resources and capabilities resulting in a high death rate for internees.

== Internment of civilians in occupied Germany after World War II ==
Long before 1945, Supreme Headquarters Allied Expeditionary Force had worked out automatic arrest categories ranging from the top Nazi Party leadership to the ortsgruppenleiter (local group leader) from the top Gestapo agents to leaders of the Hitler Youth, the Peasants' League, and the Labor Front. In May and June 1945 about 700 civilians a day were arrested, and a total of over 18,000 in August. In September 1945, 82,000 suspects were being held in internment camps, available for possible trial and sentencing as members of criminal organizations.

Well over 100,000 Germans were incarcerated by December 1945, according to Harold Marcuse. Members of the SS and functionaries of the Nazi Party and its affiliated organizations who were covered by the category of "automatic arrest" were interned by the U.S. occupation authorities in the former Dachau concentration camp. The first of these prisoners were released at the beginning of 1946.

The Soviet Union set up ten special camps in the Soviet Zone of Occupation, the former Buchenwald concentration camp became Special Camp No. 2 while Sachsenhausen concentration camp became Special Camp No. 7. They were run by the NKVD.

The British also set up a number of camps: the former Neuengamme concentration camp near Hamburg became No. 6 Civil Internment Camp and KZ Esterwegen became No. 9 Civil Internment Camp.

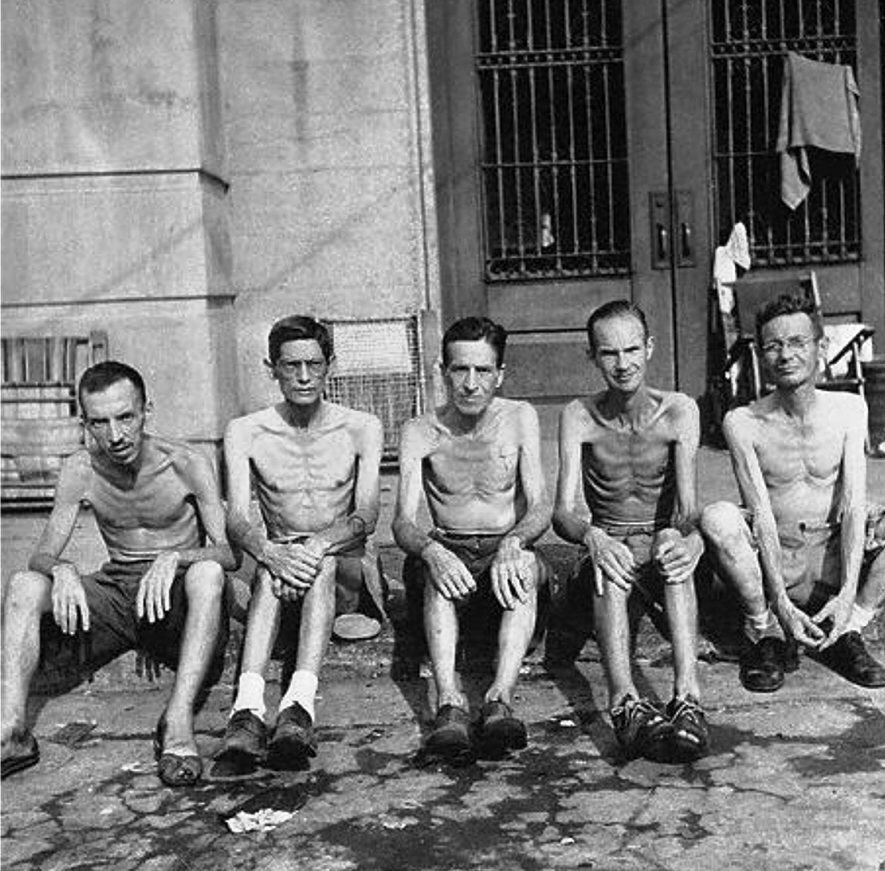
Liberated Allied civilian internees at the Santo Tomas Internment Camp, 1945

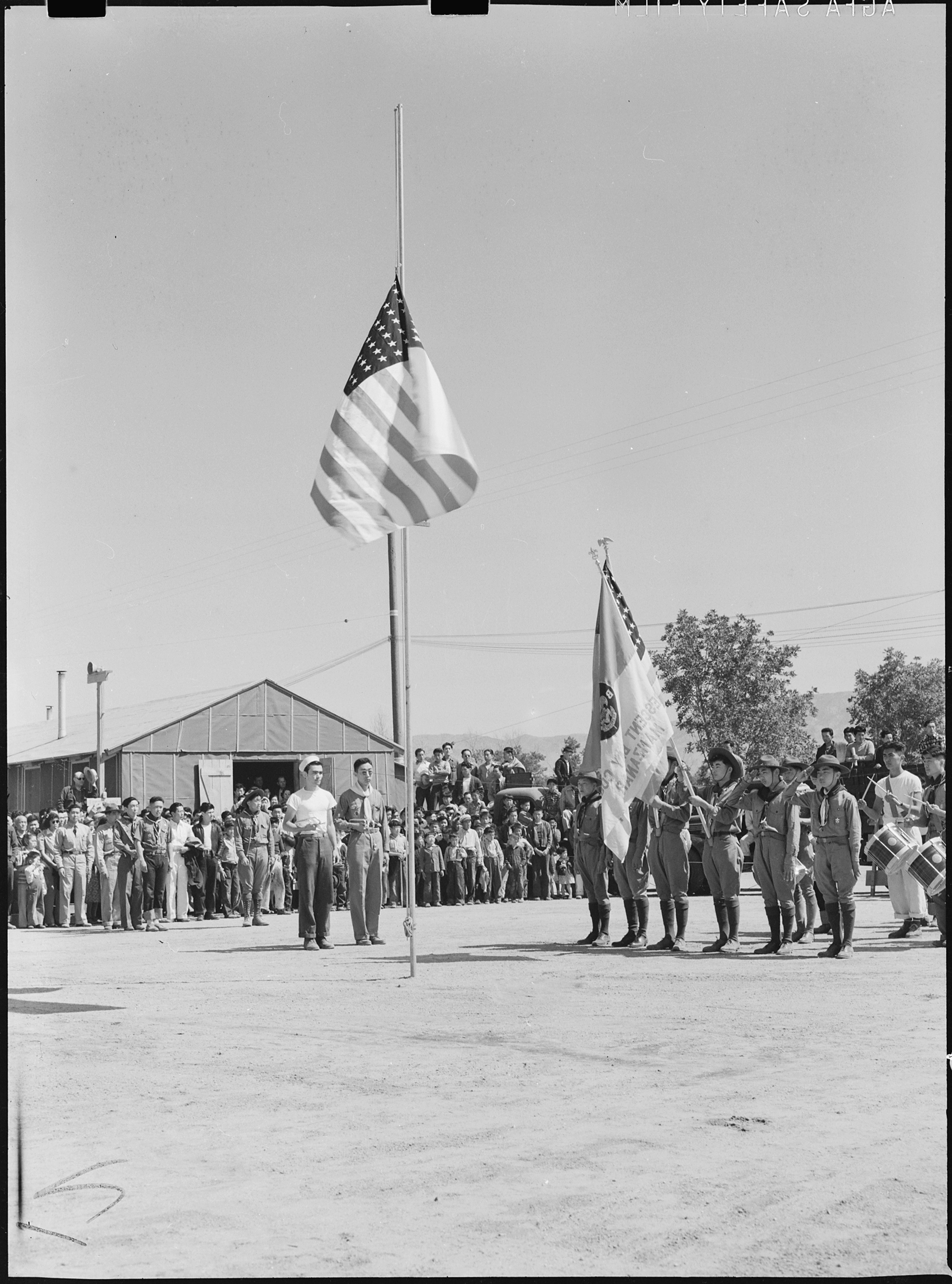
Boy Scouts at Manzanar War Relocation Center, 1942

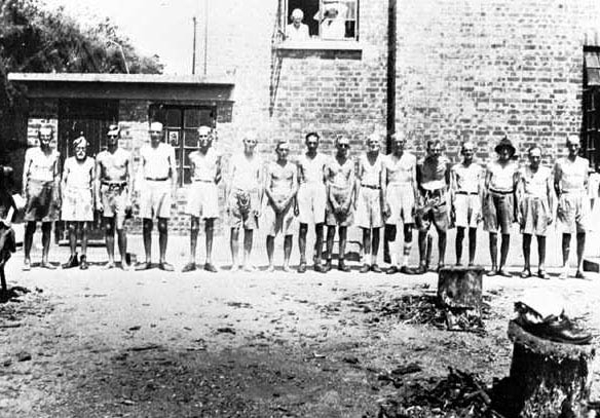
Allied civilian internees at Stanley Internment Camp during the Japanese occupation of Hong Kong

== See also ==
- Ilag
- Internment
- List of concentration and internment camps
