= Novardok Yeshiva =

Yeshiva in pre-World War II Europe

The Novardok Yeshiva was a large yeshiva in pre-World War II Europe, and a force within the Mussar movement. It was the first of hundreds of Mussar yeshivas which were all called Novardok yeshivas.

The yeshiva was established in Novogrudok, Minsk Governorate, Russian Empire in 1896, under the direction of Yosef Yozel Horwitz, a rabbi known as the Alter fun Novardok, "the elder of Novardok" in Yiddish.

Novardok yeshivas were opened in major cities including Kyiv, Kharkiv, Nizhny Novgorod, Rostov-on-Don, Zhytomyr, Berdychiv, Tsaritsyn (now Volgograd), Saratov, Plogid, and Chernihiv. Influenced by the Alter, his students also created yeshivas in Kherson, Mohyliv-Podilskyi, Kamieniec-Podolski, Berdichev, Nikolaev, Bălţi, Odessa, Piotrków Trybunalski and other places.

== Self-humiliation ==
Students of Novardok participated in deliberately humiliating behaviour, such as wearing old, patched clothing, or going to a shop and asking for a product not sold there, such as screws in a bakery. All Novardok students would share their personal belongings with friends to rid themselves of their desires for worldly possessions.

== History ==
=== Early history ===
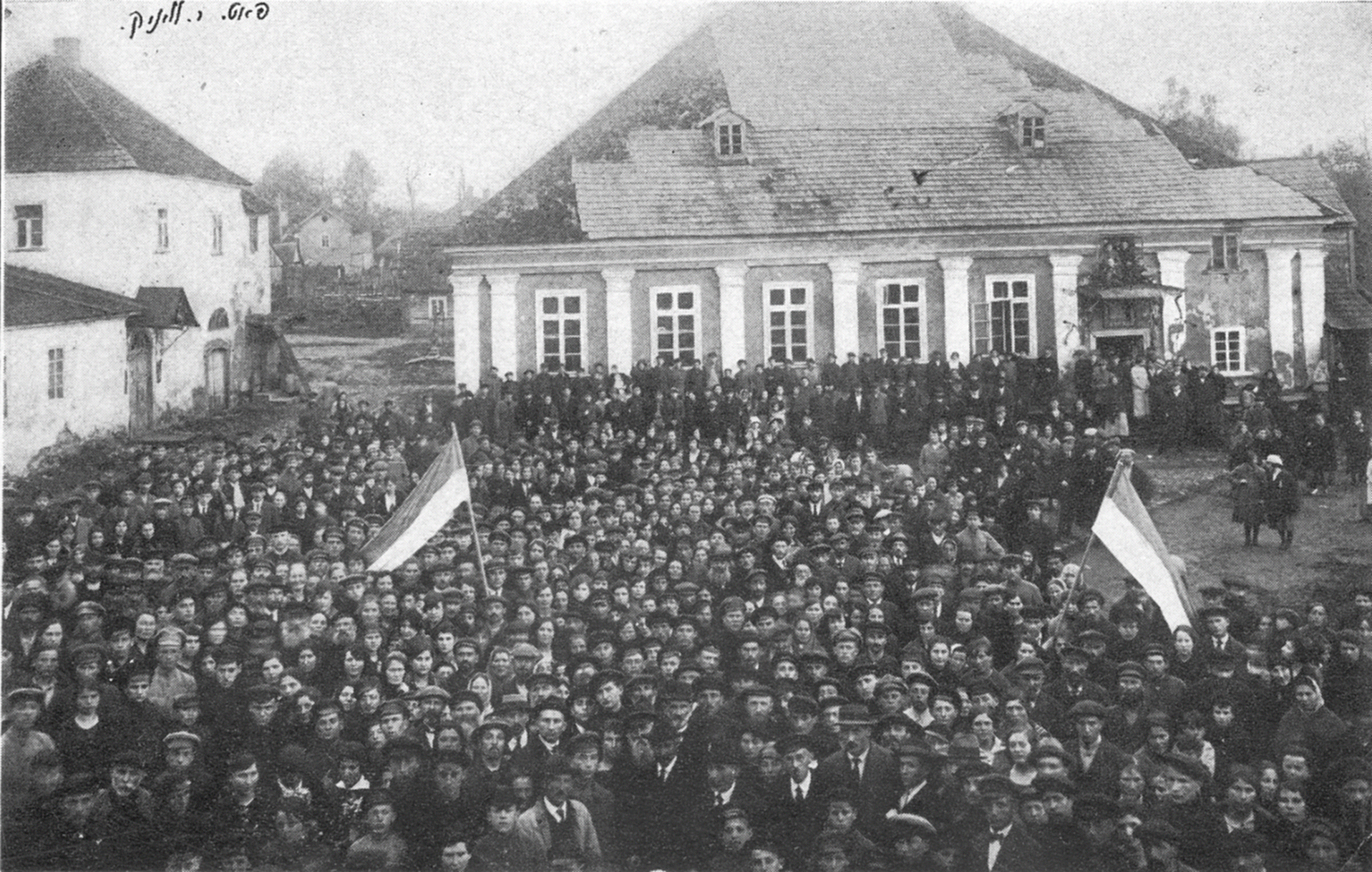
The yeshiva building in Novardok (Novogrudok), 9 May 1920

Some students came to Novardok yeshiva from as far as the Caucasus.

At first, The Alter served as both the rosh yeshiva and mashgiach of the yeshiva, delivering shiurim in Gemara and mussar. In time, though, he appointed others to deliver the Gemara shiurim, while he focused on developing the mussar aspect of the yeshiva.

=== Relocation to Gomel ===
During the outbreak of World War I, the Yeshiva moved en-masse to Gomel. Aside from functioning as a yeshiva, it also served as a safe house for young bochurim, seeking refuge from the war.

The Yeshiva would have conscripts demanded from it, but the students would refuse to come. There were stories in the yeshiva about the soldiers threatening students at gunpoint, only to have the student respond that the soldier was powerless before God.

=== Escape to Poland; Kiev era ===
After the Bolshevik takeover of Russia, the Alter ordered his students to cross the border into Poland. this was a top secret operation that not even the parents knew about. Many of the students were shot in the attempt; others were sent to Siberian prison camps, but six hundred made it across the border.

In 1919, when the Yeshiva was fleeing the war and was stationed in Kiev, a typhus outbreak occurred in the Yeshiva. The Alter succumbed to it.

=== Interwar period ===
The Alter's son-in-law, Rabbi Avraham Yoffen, was the head of the Novardok yeshiva in Białystok, the biggest Yeshiva in Poland between the two world wars. This yeshiva Beis Yosef, which was the name of all Novardok yeshivas in Poland, supervised 30 other Beis Yosef yeshivas.

=== Deportation to Siberia ===
A group of students from the Novardok yehiva were deported as a group by the Soviet Union to internment camps in Siberia, and largely remained together as a group during their internment. Their experiences are recounted in The Alter of Novardok: The life of Rav Yosef Yoizel Horowitz and his worldwide impact, a book published in 2020 by Artscroll Publishing, a major publisher of numerous books on Jewish history.

=== Post World War II ===
Avraham Yoffen survived the Holocaust, came to the United States, and reestablished the yeshiva in Brooklyn, New York.

Also influenced by the Novardok movement is the Yeshiva of Far Rockaway in Far Rockaway, New York, founded by Yechiel Perr, son-in-law of Yehuda Leib Nekritz. The yeshiva is named after Yoffen's book, Derech Ayson. Perr led the yeshiva until he died in May 2024.

Another network of Novardok Yeshivas was founded after World War II in France by Gershon Liebman, which in its heyday, had 40 schools and 6,000 students.

== Notable alumni ==
Europe

- Yehezkel Abramsky
- Meir Bar-Ilan
- Chaim Grade
- Yosef Shlomo Kahaneman
- Yaakov Yisrael Kanievsky
- Gershon Liebman
- Yaakov Galinsky
- Yisroel Yaakov Lubchansky

New York

- Irving Greenberg
- Nachman Kahane
- Yechiel Perr
- Yera'hmiel Eliyahu Botschko
