= 3rd Moscow Jewish Film Festival =

Film festival edition

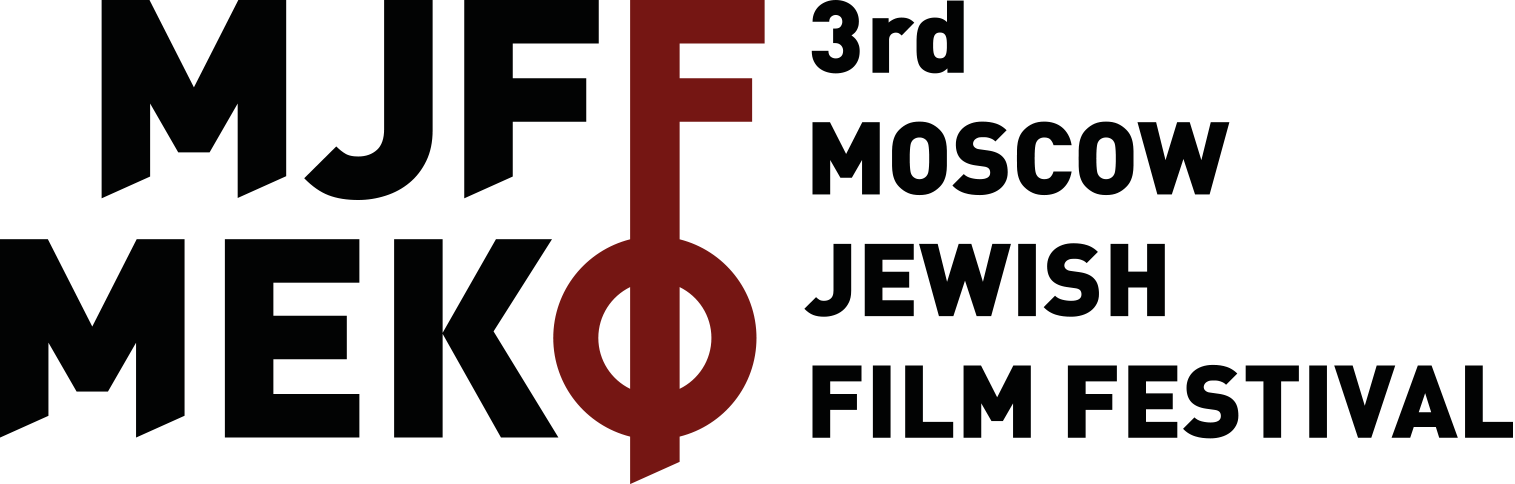

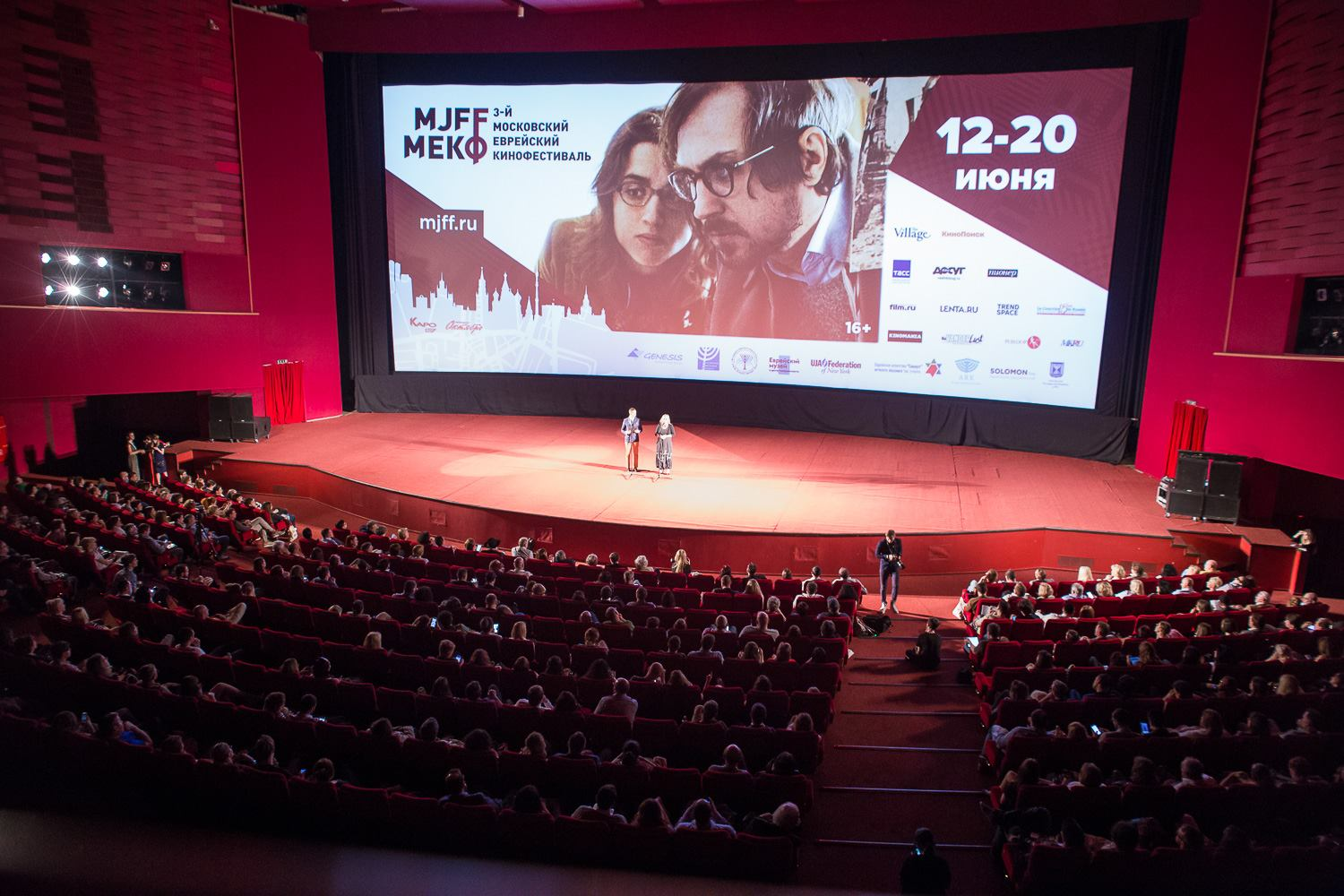
- Location: Moscow, Russia
- Festival date: June 2017
- Website: www.mjff.ru

The 3rd Moscow Jewish Film Festival is an annual international film festival, which aims to gather in the program features, documentaries, shorts and animated films on the subject of Jewish culture, history and national identity and contemporary problems. The festival was held in Moscow from 12 to 20 June 2017, at the Jewish Museum and Tolerance Center, Documentary Film Center, cinema GUM and KARO 11 cinema Oktyabr.

== Opening film ==
Opening film of the festival was The Bloom of Yesterday directed by Chris Kraus. The film was presented by famous German actor Lars Eidinger. The opening ceremony was held in cinema Oktyabr which gathered about 1,600 spectators.

== Jury ==
- Pavel Lungin – president of the jury, director, screenwriter and producer
- Igor Ugolnikov – actor, producer, director, screenwriter
- Dmitry Astrakhan – film and theatre director, actor, producer
- Julia Aug – theatre and film actor and director
- Artyom Vitkin – screenwriter, director, producer
- Elena Khazanova – director
- Arkady Ukupnik – composer, pop singer, actor, music producer

== Public council ==
For the first time a public council, which included filmmakers and leaders of the Jewish community, was created.

- Alexander Boroda, chairman of the Public Council – Rabbi, the President of the Federation of Jewish Communities of Russia, Founder and General Director of the Jewish Museum and Tolerance Center, a member of the Civic Chamber of the Russian Federation
- Yuri Kanner – president of Russian Jewish Congress, Vice President and member of the steering committee of World Jewish Congress
- Dorit Golender – diplomat, public figure, former Plenipotentiary Ambassador of the State of Israel in the Russian Federation (2010-2015)
- Alexander Mitta – film director, screenwriter
- Dmitry Litvinov – producer
- Denis Ruzayev – film сritic
- Susanna Alperina – journalist, writer
- David Schneiderov – television and radio presenter, film critic
- Vadim Rutkovsky – film critic, journalist

== Creators ==
- CEO and Producer – Egor Odintsov
- Program Director – Vanya Bowden
- Producer – Konstantin Fam
- Educational Director – Michael Libkin
- Educational Manager – Tatyana Bezhenar
- Executive Producer – Edita Bleikh
- PR Director – Elena Barkova

== Program ==
=== Competition ===
- Narrative Feature:
  - Abulele (2015) – Israel
  - The Bloom of Yesterday (2016) – Germany, France, Austria
  - Dirty Wolves (2015) – Spain
  - Demon (2015) – Poland, Israel
  - The Jews (2016) – France, Belgium
  - The Law (2014) – France
  - The Liberation of Skopje (2016) – Macedonia
  - Song of Songs (2015) – Ukraine
  - Stefan Zweig: Farewell to Europe(2016) – Germany, France, Austria
  - We had a forest (2016) – Israel
  - Across the Waters (2016) – Denmark
- Documentary Feature:
  - In Search of Israeli Cuisine (2016) – United States
  - Bring the Jews Home (2016) – Netherlands
  - Dimona Twist (2016) – Israel
  - A Woman's Story (2015) – Canada
  - Who's Gonna Love Me Now? (2016) – Israel, United Kingdom
  - Liga Terezin (2012) – Czech Republic, Israel
  - Mr Gaga (2015) – Israel
  - Moritz Daniel Oppenheim – The first Jewish painter (2016) – Germany
  - Levinsky Park (2016) – United States
  - Escape from Room 18 (2017) – Israel
  - Rabin In His Own Words (2015) – Israel
  - The Storyteller. After Walter Benjamin (2016) – Germany
  - Tel Aviv. Live (2016) – Israel
- Narrative Short:
  - Curpigeon (2016) – United States
  - In Other Words (2015) – Israel
  - Irving (2016) – United States
  - Wig Shop (2016) – United States
  - Mordechai (2016) – United Kingdom
  - The Chop (2015) – United Kingdom
  - Weeping Willows (2017) – Germany
  - Weeping Willows (2016) – Israel
  - An Old Score (2016) – Israel
- Documentary Short:
  - 800 Jews from our Town (2015) – Poland
  - War Scarred Berlin (2015) – Germany
  - Spring Chicken (2016) – United States
  - Sugihara Survivors: Jewish and Japanese, past and future (2017) – United Kingdom, Japan
  - Home Movie (2013) – United Kingdom
  - Our Hebrews (2016) – Israel
  - German Shepherd (2014) – Sweden
  - The Last Blintz (2015) – United States
  - Journey Birds (2015) – Israel
  - Joe's Violin (2016) – United States
  - 70 Hester Street (2014) – United States

=== Out of competition ===
- Special screenings:
  - Arbeit Macht Frei (2009) – Israel
  - Brutus (2016) – Russia, Ukraine, Belarus, Romania, United States, Israel
  - Another Planet (2017) – Israel
  - Zigzag of luck. Emil Braginsky (2016) – Russia
  - Paradise (2016) – Russia, France
  - Kholodnoe tango (2017) – Russia

=== Education ===
In addition to film screenings educational program was organized in the framework of the festival, consisting of lectures, discussions and debates. A famous film director and screenwriter Andrei Konchalovsky told about unique personal ideas of paradise and about how they relate to collective past experiences. Nikolay Polissky is a protagonist of the film The storyteller. After Walter Benjamin, a Russian artist, a founder of the Archstoyanie festival and Nikola Lenivets art park discussed with the film’s audience the power of conceptual thinking. Tatyana Tarasova and Yuval Rabin had a conversation about life and tragic death of Yitzhak Rabin.Isabel Gathof is the screenwriter and director of the film Moritz Daniel Oppenheim – The first Jewish painter spoke about why Moritz Oppenheim’s life and art matter today. Naor Meningher is an independent film director, and the author of the short documentary Our Hebrews discussed the phenomenon of small Jewish communities. Arseniy Semenov is a lead actor in the film Song of Songs told about Sholem Aleichem and what was everyday life like for the Jews in the beginning of the 20th century. As a part of the special event Another Planet. Why do we need a virtual Auschwitz? a film director Amir Yatsiv and film critic Larysa Malyukova discussed the rare genre of the animated documentary. Leila Guchmazova is a ballet critica jury member of the National Theatre Award "Golden Mask" gave a lecture about a famous Israeli Ohad Naharin. Ilya Altman discussed with the audience alternative ways of escape from horrors of the Holocaust.

=== Events ===
The 3rd Moscow Jewish Film Festival will open with the screening of The Bloom of Yesterday directed by Chris Kraus. The picture will be presented by Lars Eidinger. The closing ceremony of the 3rd Moscow Jewish Film Festival was held in the Jewish Museum and Tolerance Center. The jurors have presented awards in each of the four competition categories and one special prize. And also held a special screening of the war drama Kholodnoe tango directed by Pavel Chukhray. The film was presented by actress Yulia Peresild, producer Sabina Eremeeva and cameraman Igor Klebanov. It was also announced that an award named after Yakov Kaller is going to be established. It will be presented to the best film of the Moscow Jewish Film Festival’s program that was made in Russia. This year, the award went to the film Brutus directed by Konstantin Fam.

== Winners ==
- Winner of nomination Narrative Feature – The Bloom of Yesterday (2016)
- Winner of nomination Documentary Feature – Who's Gonna Love Me Now? (2016)
- Winner of nomination Narrative Short – In Other Words (2015)
- Winner of nomination Documentary Short – Joe's Violin (2016)
- Special jury prize – Song of Songs (2015)
- Honorable prize for outstanding contribution to the development of Jewish cinema in Russia – Andrei Konchalovsky

== Partners ==
- Russian Jewish Congress
- Federation of Jewish Communities of Russia
- Jewish Museum and Tolerance Center
- Genesis Philanthropy Group
- The network of cinemas "Karo"
- Jewish Agency for Israel
- UJA-Federation of New York
- Jewish Business Club "Solomon"
- Ark Pictures

== See also ==
- Ekaterinburg Jewish Film Festival
