= 4th Moscow Jewish Film Festival =

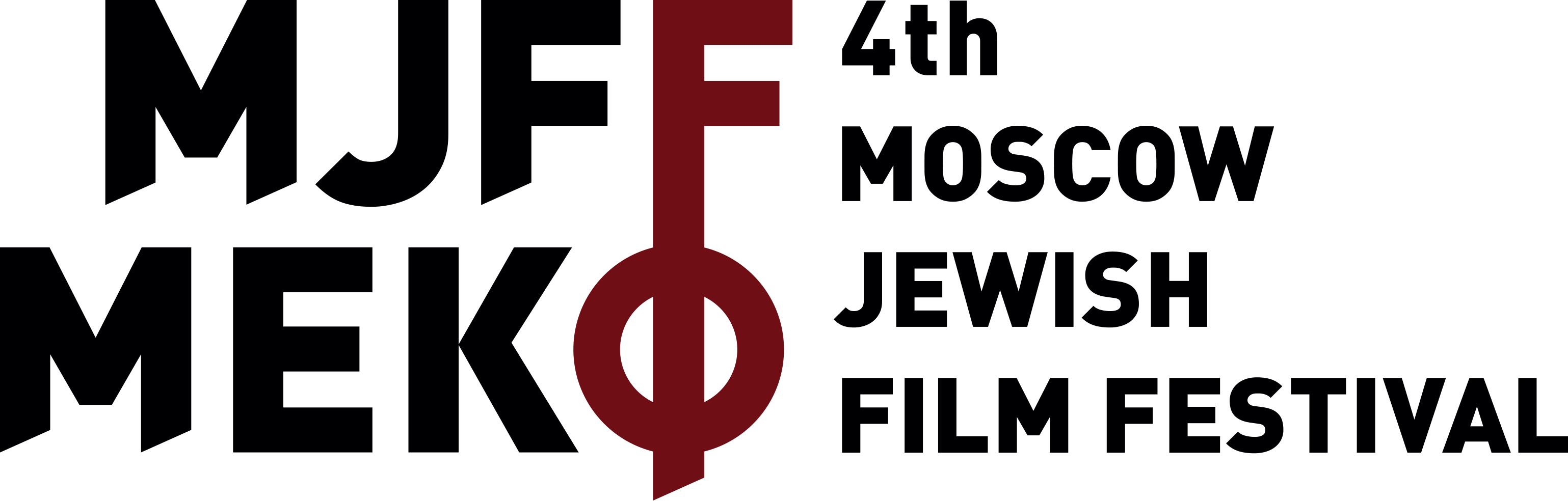

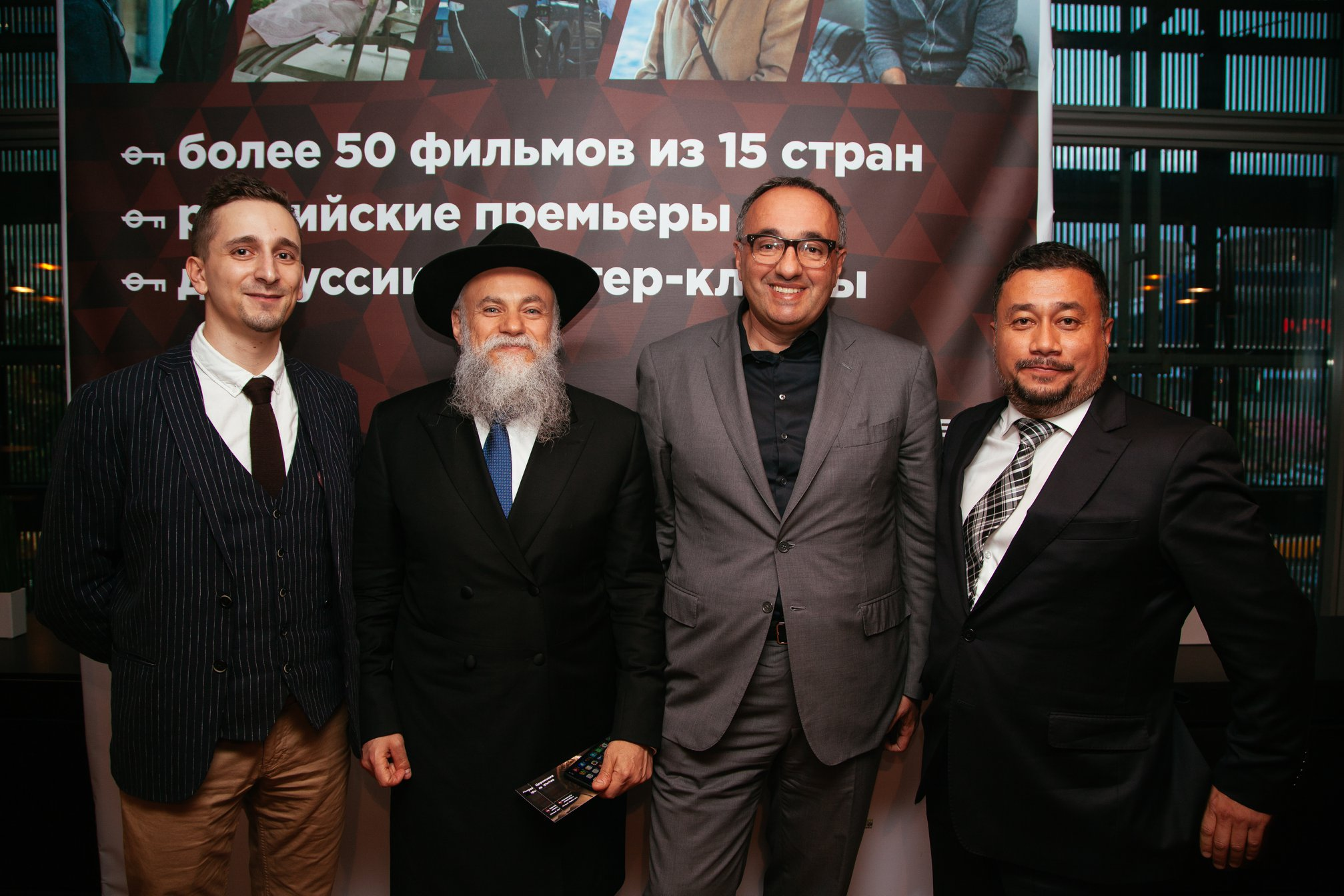
- Location: Moscow, Russia
- Festival date: May 2018
- Website: www.mjff.ru

The 4th Moscow Jewish Film Festival is an annual international film festival, which aims to gather in the program features, documentaries, shorts and animated films on the subject of Jewish culture, history and national identity and contemporary problems. The festival was held in Moscow from 22 to 30 May 2018, at the Jewish Museum and Tolerance Center, Documentary Film Center, cinema GUM, KARO 11 cinema Oktyabr, Moskino Zvezda and Garage Screen Summer Cinema.

== Opening film ==
Opening film of the festival was Denial directed by Mick Jackson. The welcome speech at the Opening ceremony was held by the President of Jury Alexander Rodnyansky and famous American director and producer Brett Ratner. The ceremony was held in cinema Oktyabr which gathered about 1,600 spectators.

== Jury ==
- Alexander Rodnyansky – president of the jury, producer of TV-shows and feature films, member of the Academy of Motion Picture Arts and Sciences, founder of the first independent Ukrainian TV channel 1+1, CEO of CTC Media broadcasting company
- Brett Ratner – American filmmaker, producer, screenwriter and actor
- Vladimir Kott – film, TV and theatre director
- Larisa Maliukova – film critic
- Alisa Khazanova – actress of theater and cinema, director
- Vladimir Alenikov – director, writer, translator, screenwriter
- Dmitry Litvinov – producer
- Ilya Bachurin – producer
- Makar Kozhukhov – producer, distributor

== Public Council ==
A public council, created in 2017, continued its work and included the following filmmakers and leaders of the Jewish community:

- Alexander Boroda, chairman of the Public Council – Rabbi, the president of the Federation of Jewish Communities of Russia, founder and general director of the Jewish Museum and Tolerance Center, a member of the Civic Chamber of the Russian Federation
- Yuri Kanner – president of Russian Jewish Congress, vice president and member of the steering committee of World Jewish Congress
- Dorit Golender – diplomat, public figure, former plenipotentiary ambassador of the State of Israel in the Russian Federation (2010-2015)
- Alexander Mitta – film director, screenwriter
- Garry Koren – diplomat
- Denis Ruzayev – film сritic
- Susanna Alperina – journalist, writer
- David Schneiderov – television and radio presenter, film critic

== Creators ==
- CEO and producer – Egor Odintsov
- Program director – Vanya Bowden
- Producer – Konstantin Fam
- Educational director – Michael Libkin
- Educational manager – Tatyana Bezhenar
- Executive producer – Elena Barkova
- Line producer – Diana Nadarova
- Media manager – Margarita Voevodina

== Program ==
=== Competition ===
- Narrative Feature:
  - 1945 (2017) – Hungary
  - Menashe (2017) – United States
  - The Invisibles (2017) – Germany
  - Disobedience (2017) – United Kingdom, Ireland, United States
  - An Act of Defiance (2017) – Netherlands, South Africa
  - Foxtrot (2017) – Israel, Germany, France, Switzerland
- Documentary Feature:
  - Into_nation of Big Odessa (2018) – Russia, Ukraine
  - Forever Pure (2016) – Israel
  - The Dead Nation (2017) – Romania
  - WALL (2017) – Canada
  - Wall (2017) – Israel
  - #uploading_holocaust (2016) – Israel
- Narrative Short:
  - Rebel (2016) – United States, Israel
  - The Outer Circle (2017) – United Kingdom
  - The Giraffe (2017) – Ukraine
  - Close the Shutters (2016) – Israel
  - Counterlight (2017) – Israel
  - Summer (2018) – United States
  - My Yiddish Papi (2017) – Canada
  - Keep it Cool (2014) – Israel
  - The Departure (2017) – Germany
  - Adieu My Beloved (2017) – Canada
  - Seven Minutes (2017) – Israel
  - Shemira (2017) – United Kingdom
  - Vanity of vanities (2017) – Russia
- Documentary Short:
  - 116 cameras (2017) – United States
  - Billsville (2017) – Canada
  - Vishneva, Belarus Soviet Union Poland (2016) – United States
  - The rabbi's most unlikely granddaughter (2017) – Poland
  - Pana Ha'Geshem (2016) – Israel, France
  - Lon (2017) – Belgium
  - Fathers and Sons (2018) – Hungary
  - Wall, Crevice, Tear (2015) – Israel
  - Tashlikh (2017) – Israel, Netherlands

=== Out of Competition ===
- Special screenings:
  - Towards Jerusalem (1990) – Austria
  - Nathan the Wise (1922) – Germany
  - Papa (2004) – Russia
- Experimental:
  - The Disappeared (2018) – Israel, Germany
  - Salarium (2017) – United Kingdom
- Narrative Feature:
  - The Cakemaker (2017) – Israel, Germany
  - The Young Karl Marx (2017) – France, Belgium, Germany
  - Norman (2016) – Israel, United States
  - Denial (2016) – United Kingdom, United States
  - Witnesses (2018) – Russia, Belarus, Ukraine, Poland, France, Israel, Czech Republic, Romania
  - Keep the Change (2017) – United States
  - Fritz Lang (2017) – Germany
- Documentary Feature:
  - Bobbi Jene (2017) – Denmark, Israel, United States
  - The Wonderful Kingdom of Papa Alaev (2016) – Israel
  - Koudelka Shooting Holy Land (2015) – Germany, Czech Republic
  - Dreaming of a Jewish Christmas (2017) – Canada
  - Muhi: Generally Temporary (2017) – Israel
  - The Island (2017) – Israel
  - Ink of Yam (2017) – Germany

=== Education ===
In addition to film screenings educational program was organized in the framework of the festival. A discussion “Odessa as creative Klondike” dedicated to the film “Into_nation of Big Odessa” took place at Oktyabr Cinema. Following the screening of the documentary “Bobbi Jene” about the woman who dances, fights for her independence and bravely faces its consequences, the guests of the Festival had an opportunity to attend the unusual dancing workshop “Living an artistic image through the body” by Toma Nuevo. A discussion “From patriotism to nationalism. Where the boundaries are?” led by public figure Alexander Kargin and TV-presenters Kirill and Andrey Eykhfus, following the screening of the documentary film “Forever Pure” took place at the Documentary film center. The festival also held the screening of the documentary “Ink of Yam” and the lecture “Ink of Yam. Signs on the skin: social and symbolic functions of tattoos”, where Dr.Oxana Moroz and tattoo master Sergey Pavlov (Mysh) discuss the social, aesthetic and symbolical functions of tattoos in modern society. As a part of the Special screenings program Austrian director Ruth Beckermann had a Q&A session about her past works and future plans. The Jewish Museum and Tolerance center hosted the screening of Nathan the Wise with musical accompaniment by the “Speedball trio” band and arranged theatre director Vladimir Mirzoev’s workshop “Modern directing at the intersection of feature, documentary and digital filmmaking.”

=== Events ===
The 4th Moscow Jewish Film Festival opened with the screening of 'Denial directed by Mick Jackson. The welcome speech at the Opening ceremony was held by the President of Jury Alexander Rodnyansky and famous American filmmaker Brett Ratner. The closing ceremony of the 4th Moscow Jewish Film Festival was held in the Documentary film center. The jurors presented awards in each of the four competition categories and one special prize. Moreover, within the festival the Honorable prize for outstanding contribution to the development of Jewish cinema in Russia was presented to Vladimir Mashkov for his film “Papa”. This year Yakov Kaller award for the best Russian Jewish film of 2018 was given to Sobibor by Konstantin Khabensky. Sofia Aleksandrovna, Yakov Kaller’s sister, presented the award to producer of “Sobibor” Ilya Vasilyev.

== Winners ==
- Winner of nomination Narrative Feature – Foxtrot (2017)
- Winner of nomination Documentary Feature – Into_nation of Big Odessa (2018)
- Winner of nomination Narrative Short – Vanity of vanities (2017)
- Winner of nomination Documentary Short – 116 cameras (2017)
- Jury Prize – Menashe (2017)
- Honorable prize for outstanding contribution to the development of Jewish cinema in Russia – Vladimir Mashkov
- Yakov Kaller award – Sobibor (2018)

== Partners ==
- Federation of Jewish Communities of Russia
- Blavatnik Family Foundation
- Genesis Philanthropy Group
- Russian Jewish Congress
- The network of cinemas "Karo"
- Hotel Metropol Moscow

== See also ==
- Ekaterinburg Jewish Film Festival
