= 5th Moscow Jewish Film Festival =

Film festival edition

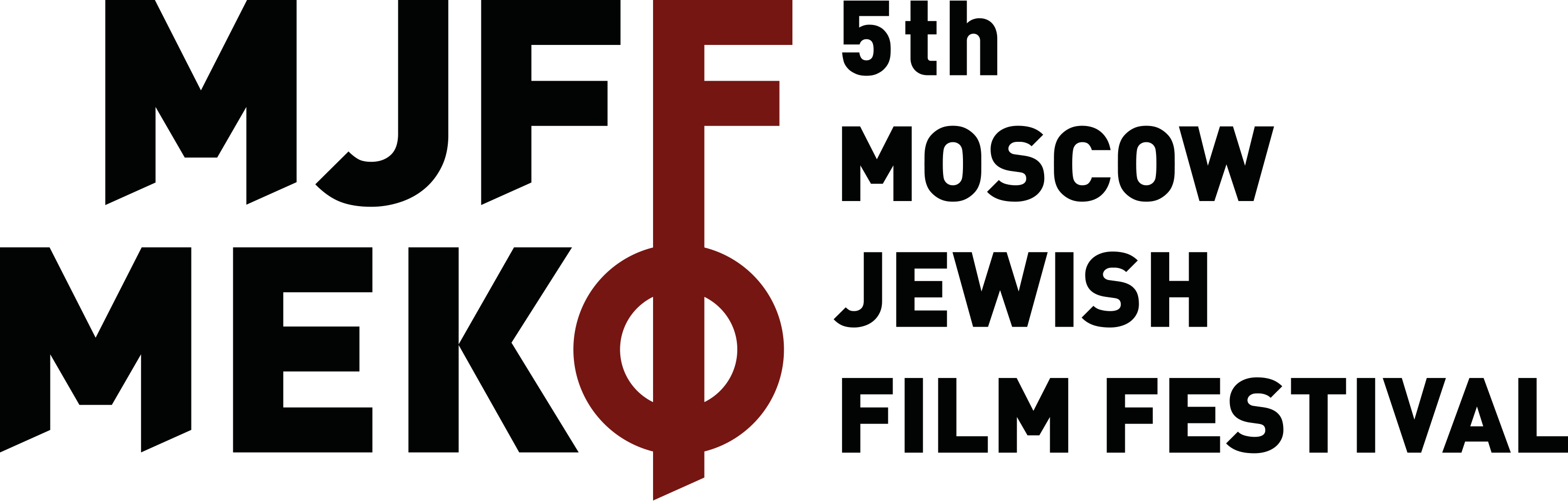

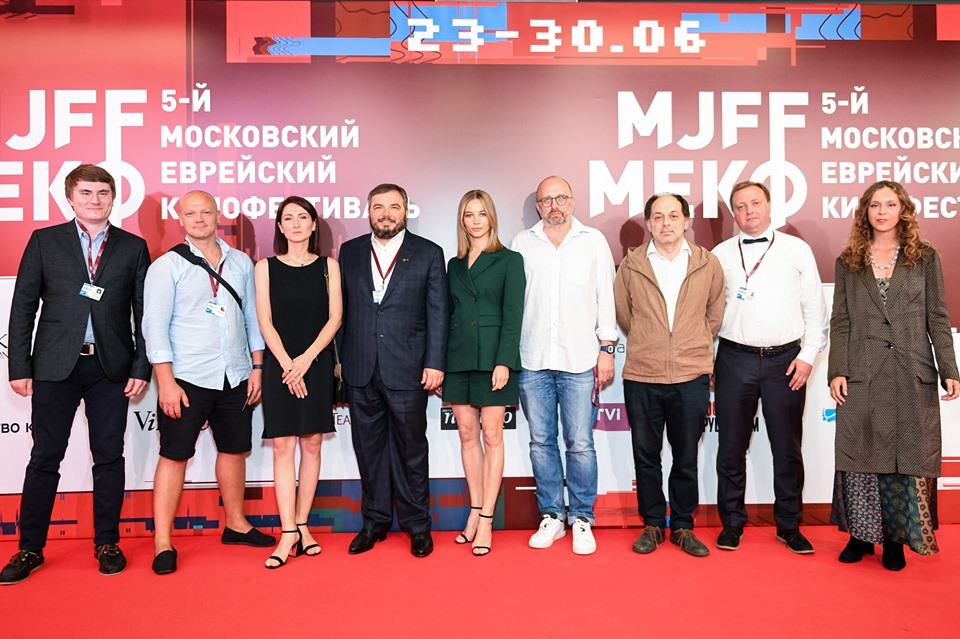
- Location: Moscow, Russia
- Festival date: June 2019
- Website: www.mjff.ru

The 5th Moscow Jewish Film Festival is an annual international film festival, which aims to gather in the program features, documentaries, shorts and animated films on the subject of Jewish culture, history and national identity and contemporary problems.

The festival was held in Moscow from 23 to 30 June 2019 at the Jewish Museum and Tolerance Center, Documentary Film Center, cinema GUM, KARO 11 cinema Oktyabr, Moskino Zvezda, Moskino Kosmos, Knizhniki and Moscow Jewish Community Center.

== Opening film ==
The ceremony opened with the concert of the composer Alexei Aigui and Ensemble 4'33'. The welcome speech at the Opening ceremony was held by the President of Jury Timur Weinstein and American director Shawn Snyder presented his film To Dust as the Russian premiere and the opening film of the 5th Moscow Jewish Film Festival.

== Jury ==
- Timur Weinstein – President of the jury General producer of the NTV television company, member of the International Academy of EMMY, Academy of Russian Television, Russian Academy of Cinematographic Arts.

Main Competition

- Artem Vasilyev – Producer, CEO of METRAFILMS Studio. Producer of such films as "Paper Soldier", "A Room and a Half", "Act of Nature", "Under the Electric Clouds", "Anna's War", "Dovlatov", "The Humorist".
- Nigina Sayfullaeva – Russian film director, screenwriter and producer. The creator of such films as "About love. Only for adults", "What is my name", "Loyalty".
- Stephen Mao – American film producer and President of Studio Mao a film production, distribution, and finance company.
- Jacqueline Semha Gmach – Author of From Bomboloni to Bagel: A Story of Two Worlds. A board member of San Diego Organizations, Anti-Defamation League, Agency for Jewish Education, American Technion Society, etc. She is a project director of USC Shoah Foundation.
- Nick Holdsworth – Writer, journalist and filmmaker with 25 years’ experience of covering Russian and Eastern European affairs.
- Nikita Lavretski – Film director. Nikita Lavretski made his feature film debut with ‘Belarusian Psycho’ which received the Best Belarusian Film Award at the 2015 Minsk International Film Festival Listapad. His 2019 feature ‘Sasha's Hell’ was selected by Moscow International Film Festival.
- Svetlana Ustinova – Theatre and film actress, producer, scriptwriter. Graduated Gerasimov Institute of Cinematography, with Vladimir Grammatikov as professor. In 2018 she was accepted to Chekhov Moscow Art Theatre's troupe.

Documentary Film Competition Jury

- Yevgeny Gindilis – Russian film and TV producer. A member of the European Film Academy and Kinosouyz. He is the Head of CentEast Moscow; Executive Director of the Red Square Screenings film market. Co-Founder of Kinopoisk film market. General producer of TVINDIE Film Production.
- Georgy Molodtsov – Director, producer and VR content expert. Board member of the Russian Documentary Guild. As director and creative director at the Social Advertising Laboratory he implemented more than thirty social-issue campaigns.
- Denis Kataev – Journalist, host of the information service, as well as programs "Artificial selection" and "Lectures" on the Rain TV channel.

Narrative Short Film Competition Jury

- Kirill Vasilyev – Director of the film "Well, Hello, Oksana Sokolova," the TV series "Fitness." The winner of the film festival “Koroche” 2016.
- Yanna Buryak – Producer, founder of the Mimesis film company and co-founder of the distribution company VOSTOK. Mimesis' most successful films are: Fedor's Journey Through Moscow At The Turn Of The XXI Century and "Milk".
- Dmitry Yakunin – Producer, director of the Youth Center of the Union of Cinematographers of Russia, Secretary of the Union of Cinematographers of Russia, General Producer of the All-Russian Project "Short Film’s Day", Director of the Moscow Film Festival "Budem Zhit".

== Public Council ==
A public council, created in 2017, continued its work and included the following filmmakers and leaders of the Jewish community:

- Alexander Boroda, Chairman of the Public Council – Rabbi, the President of the Federation of Jewish Communities of Russia, Founder and General Director of the Jewish Museum and Tolerance Center, a member of the Civic Chamber of the Russian Federation
- Yuri Kanner – President of Russian Jewish Congress, Vice President and member of the steering committee of World Jewish Congress
- Mikhail Gusman – Journalist, First deputy director general of ITAR-TASS, recipient of the Russian State Prize, Honored Journalist of the Russian Federation.
- Boruch Gorin – Journalist, publisher
- Dorit Golender – diplomat, public figure, former Plenipotentiary Ambassador of the State of Israel in the Russian Federation (2010-2015)
- Alexander Mitta – film director, screenwriter
- Garry Koren – diplomat
- Svetlana Maksimchenko – Producer, Moskino General Director and Executive Secretary of Moscow Film Commission.
- Susanna Alperina – journalist, writer
- Anton Dolin – Journalist, film critic

== Board Of Trustees ==
- Elena Kaller – Entrepreneur, co-founder of the Yakov Kaller Award
- Anton Klyachin – Lawyer, Managing partner of the law firm Salomons.
- Igor Marich – Financier, Managing Director for money and derivatives markets, member of the Management Board of PJSC Moscow Exchange.

== Creators ==
- CEO and Producer – Egor Odintsov
- Program Director – Vanya Bowden
- Producer – Konstantin Fam
- Executive Producer – Anna Adamskaya
- Executive Producer – Elena Barkova
- Educational Director – Michael Libkin
- Line Producer – Diana Nadarova
- Educational Manager – Tatyana Bezhenar
- Media Manager – Margarita Voevodina

== Program ==
=== Main Competition ===
- Narrative Feature:
  - To Dust (2018) — United States
  - Fig Tree (2018) — Ethiopia, France, Germany, Israel
  - Dolce Fine Giornata (2019) — Poland
  - Red Cow (2018) — Israel
  - The Unorthodox (2018) – Israel
  - Seder-Masochism (2018) — United States

=== Competition ===
- Documentary Feature:
  - 93Queen – United States
  - Advocate (2019) — Israel, Canada, Switzerland
  - Chekhov and Levitan (2019) – Russia
  - The Waldheim Waltz (2018) — Austria
  - City of Joel (2018) – United States
  - Dina Rubina. On the sunny side (2018) – Russia
  - In Her Footsteps (2017) — Israel
- Documentary Short:
  - Arpad Weisz (2018) – Italy
  - The Archive (2018) – United Kingdom
  - Death Metal Grandma (2018) – United States
  - Never locked (2018) – Israel
  - Life Through a Lens (2016) – United States
  - Art Undercover (2017) – Israel
  - Nazi VR (2017) – Germany
  - A Night at the Garden (2017) — United States
  - My Father’s Son (2018) — Israel
  - Wendy’s Shabbat (2017) — United States
  - Edek (2018) – United Kingdom
- Narrative Short:
  - The Entertainer (2017) – United Kingdom
  - Still alive (2017) – Australia
  - Double Date (2016) – Canada
  - Division Ave (2019) – United States
  - A Hand Sewn Star (2018) – France
  - Mum's Hairpins (2019) – Ukraine, Russia, Germany
  - Mr. Bernstein (2016) – Canada
  - A Prayer (2017) – United States
  - In His Place (2018) – Israel
  - Hope Dies Last (2017) – United Kingdom
  - OMA (2017) – United States
  - The Offspring (2018) – Israel
  - Travelogue Tel Aviv (2017) – Switzerland
  - Shmelky (2018) – Israel

=== Out of Competition ===
- Special screenings
  - Anna's War (2018) — Russia
  - Skin (2018) — United States
  - Sefarad (2019) – Portugal
- Narrative feature
  - Here and Now (2018) – Israel
  - Winter Hunt (2017) – Germany
  - New Year Repair (2019) – Russia
  - Promise at Dawn (2017) – France, Belgium
  - The Mover (2018) – Latvia
  - Synonyms (2019) — Israel, France
- Documentary feature
  - Jonathan Agassi Saved My Life (2018) — Israel, Germany
  - Itzhak (2017) – Israel, United States
  - Carl Laemmle (2019) – United States
  - King Bibi (2018) – Israel
  - Megiddo (2018) – Israel, Canada
  - Museum (2017) – Israel
  - After Auschwitz (2017) – United States
  - Prosecuting Evil: The Extraordinary World of Ben Ferencz (2018) — United States
- Retro
  - Inglourious Basterds (2009) — United States, Germany
  - From Hell to Hell (1996) – Russia, Belarus, Germany
  - Triumph Over Violence (1968) — Soviet Union

=== Education ===
The educational program was organized with the support of the Genesis Philanthropy Group. Stephen Mao held a discussion about significance of the film Skin in today's political and social environment. The Q&A session following the documentary Jonathan Agassi Saved My Life took place in Documentary Film Center, where Jonathan Agassi’s mother Anna Langer and film director Tomer Haymann talked about a story of love and trust. Main Competition participants were invited to Moscow to present their films and talk to MJFF audience. Thus, Eliran Malka presented his film The Unorthodox and the star of Red Cow Avigaiil Kovari with Israeli sexologist Katya Katsman held discussion about female friendship, old traditions and modern prohibitions. Seder-Masochism were presented by its director Nina Pailey, who held a Q&A session with film critic Dina Goder. A conversation about love, loss and decomposition followed the screening of To Dust with Shawn Snyder as a guest. A Q&A “Filming in Ethiopia with an international crew” led by Yotam Ishay — Graduate of the Film and Television department in Tel-Aviv University, following the screening of the feature film Fig Tree took place at the Oktyabr Cinema center. The Jewish Museum and Tolerance center hosted the screening of Triumph Over Violence and arranged a dispute “Why everyone should watch Triumph Over Violence” with Nikolai Svanidze, Vsevolod Chaplin, Mikhail Gusman, Boruch Gorin, Konstantin Fam, Jacqueline Gmach as special guests.

=== Events ===
The 5th Moscow Jewish Film Festival opened with the screening of To Dust, directed by American director Shawn Snyder, who held the welcome speech at the Opening with the President of Jury Timur Weinstein. The closing ceremony of the 5th Moscow Jewish Film Festival was held in the Moskino Kosmos. The jurors presented awards in each of the four competition categories and one special prize. Moreover, within the festival the Honorable prize for outstanding contribution to the development of Jewish cinema in Russia was presented to Dmitry Astrakhan for his film From Hell to Hell. This year Yakov Kaller award for the best Russian Jewish film of 2019 was given to Anna's War by Aleksey Fedorchenko. Elena Kaller, Yakov Kaller’s widow, presented the award to producer of the film Artyom Vasilyev. The inaugural special Organizers' Award was bestowed upon director Nina Paley, the author of the animated feature Seder-Masochism. Berel Lazar, the Chief Rabbi of Russia, awarded the Special Award of the 5th Moscow Jewish Film Festival for Contribution to Preservation of Sephardic Culture and History to Yigal Dias Benzion, the President of the Jewish Community of Oporto who represented the film “Sefarad”.

== Winners ==
- Winner of nomination Best Film – The Unorthodox (2018)
- Winner of nomination Best Documentary Feature – Advocate (2019)
- Winner of nomination Best Short Film – Travelogue Tel Aviv (2017)
- Winner of nomination Best Documentary Short Film – My Father’s Son (2018)
- Jury Prize – To Dust (2018)
- Honorable prize for outstanding contribution to the development of Jewish cinema in Russia – Dmitry Astrakhan
- Yakov Kaller Award – Anna's War (2019)
- Organizers' Award – Seder-Masochism (2018)
- Special Award of the 5th Moscow Jewish Film Festival for Contribution to Preservation of Sephardic Culture and History – Sefarad (2019)

== Partners ==
- Federation of Jewish Communities of Russia
- Blavatnik Family Foundation
- Genesis Philanthropy Group
- Jewish Museum and Tolerance Center
- Russian Jewish Congress
- The network of cinemas "Karo"
- The network of cinemas "Moskino"
- Azimut Hotels

== See also ==
- Ekaterinburg Jewish Film Festival
