= 1st Moscow Jewish Film Festival =

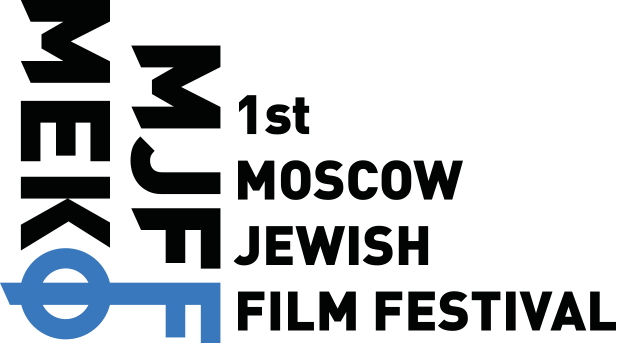

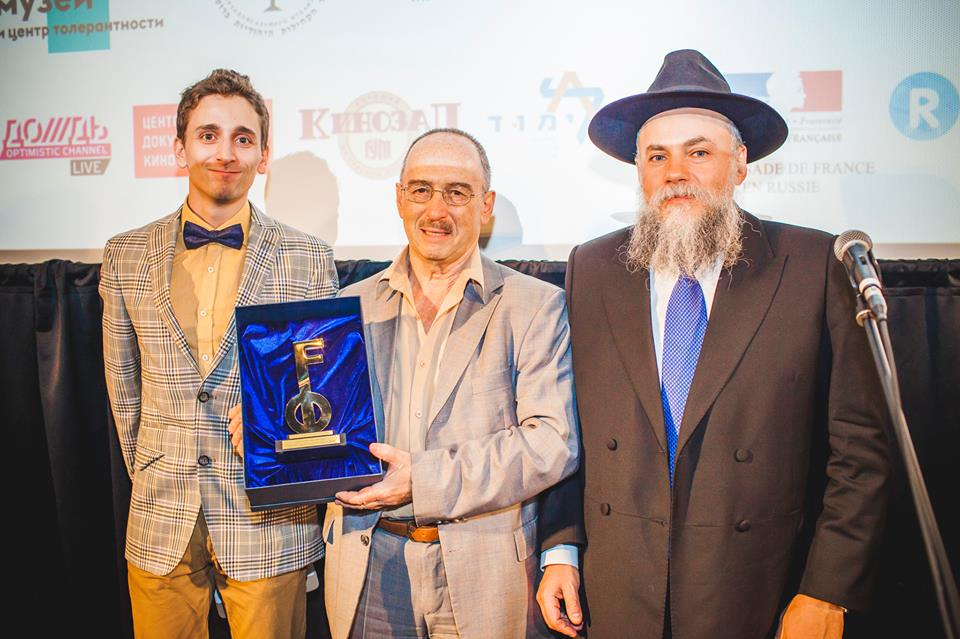
- Closing film: Ida
- Location: Moscow, Russia
- Founded: 2015
- Festival date: June
- Website: www.mjff.ru

The 1st Moscow Jewish Film Festival is an annual international film festival, which aims to gather in the program features, documentaries, shorts and animated films on the subject of Jewish culture, history and national identity and contemporary problems. The festival was first held in Moscow from 14 to 17 June 2015, at the Jewish Museum and Tolerance Center, the Documentary film center and cinema GUM.

== Jury ==
- Konstantin Fam — film director, producer, screenwriter
- Alexander Boroda — Rabbi, President of the Federation of Jewish Communities of Russia
- Yekaterina Mtsituridze — television presenter, film critic and head of Roskino
- Alexander Kott — film director, screenwriter, producer
- Ruslan Sorokin — screenwriter, producer

== Creators ==
- CEO and Producer — Egor Odintsov
- Program Director — Vanya Bowden
- Educational Director — Rusina Lekuh

== Program ==
Nomination "Jews Today":

- Wake up, O Zion (2013) - United States
- Felix and Meira (2014) - Canada
- Journey Hannah (2014) - Germany, Israel
- Somewhere (2014) - Germany
- Get (2014) - Israel, France, Germany

Nomination "A true story":

- When people die - sing (2014) - Russia, the United States
- Jacob Kreizer. Forgotten General (2015) - Russia
- There will come a night (2014) - Great Britain, Germany, United States, Israel, Denmark, France
- Regina (2013) - Hungary, UK, Germany
- Rachel: Woman marked Air (2013) - the United States, Argentina
- About Susan Sontag (2014) - United States

Nomination "A short story":

- Salome's Nose (2014) - Germany, United States
- End Boulevard (2014) - Germany, USA
- Squirrel and the Penguin (2012) - United Kingdom
- Human Principle (2014) - Germany
- Auschwitz in the head (2013) - Israel, Poland, United Kingdom
- I am Mitzvah (2014) - United States

Out of competition:

- Shoes (2012) - Russia, Poland, Belarus, Czech Republic, France
- The Rabbi's Cat (2011) - France
- Ida (2013) - Poland, Denmark
- Israeli animation Avi Chai Foundation (2014) - Israel

== Education ==
In addition to film screenings educational program was organized in the framework of the festival, consisting of lectures, discussions and debates. The speakers were: Russian philosopher Igor Chubarov, writer Linor Goralik, researcher of Jewish thought Uri Gershovich, gospel playwright Maria Zielinskaya, historian Sergei Stepanishev and others.

== Winners ==
- Winner in the "Brief" - End Boulevard (2014)
- The winner in the nomination "The Jews of today" - Somewhere (2014)
- Winner in the category "Certificate" - Documentary Was night (2014)
- Honorary Prize "For outstanding contribution to the development of Jewish cinema in Russia" - Yakov Kaller
- "Special prize of the Jury" - Documentary Regina (2013)

== See also ==
- Ekaterinburg Jewish Film Festival
