= Kaddish (2019 film) =

- Directed by: Konstantin Fam
- Produced by: Konstantin Fam; Boris Mints; Egor Odintsov; Katerina Mikhailova; Gennady Pavlovich; Tatiana Dovidovskaya
- Starring: Lenn Kudrjawizki; Vladimir Koshevoy; Mikhail Gorevoy; Vyacheslav Chepurchenko; Maria King; Marusya Zykova
- Music by: Egor Romanenko
- Release date: June 2019
- Running time: 87 minutes
- Countries: Russia; Belarus; Israel

Kaddish (Russian: Кадиш) is the second feature film directed by Konstantin Fam. Like Konstantin’s previous work, this film is dedicated to the memory of the victims of the Holocaust.

== Plot ==
The testament of a former concentration camp prisoner confronts and turns the lives of two young people from different worlds around, shedding light on the tragic history of their family.

== Cast ==
- Lenn Kudrjawizki – Leonid
- Masha King – Rachel
- Vladimir Koshevoi – Leo
- Mikhail Gorevoy – Richard
- Vyacheslav Chepurchenko – Kurt
- Anzhelika Kashirina – Katya
- Alim Kandur – Shlomo
- Vyacheslav Ganenko – Moshe

== Production ==
The film was shot with Russian-Belarusian co-production with the participation of Sasha Klein Production (Israel). The filming took place in Moscow, New York, Prague, Brest, Minsk and ended in Israel.

The film was created with the financial support of the Ministry for Culture of Russia, as well as private philanthropists.

== Confession ==
Film premiered as part of the competition program of the 1st ECG Film Festival in London in June 2019, where film got Grand Prix. The film is also a contender for the Golden Globe in the category "Best Foreign Film". Konstantin Fam also got into the longlist of the Golden Eagle Award of the National Academy of Motion Pictures Arts and Sciences of Russia for 2019 in the category "Best Director". The film "Kaddish" was also considered by the Oscar Committee of Belarus, but was not selected.

== Accolades ==
=== Awards ===
- 1st ECG Film Festival in London, Grand Prix
- Amur Autumn Film Festival, Blagoveshchensk, Russia - 2019, Best Screenplay, Media Selection
- Sochi International Film Festival and Awards 2019, Best Music

== Official partners ==
- Federation of Jewish Communities of Russia
- Russian Jewish Congress
- Chabad Odessa
