= Brutus (2016 film) =

- Directed by: Konstantin Fam
- Produced by: Konstantin Fam; Ian Fisher Romanovsky; Alex A. Petruhin; Yuri Igrusha; Egor Odintsov
- Starring: Oksana Fandera, Filipp Yankovsky, Vladimir Koshevoi, Anna Churin, Maria Zykova, Marta Drozdov
- Music by: Egor Romanenko
- Release date: June 25, 2016 (Moscow International Film Festival)
- Running time: 35 minutes
- Countries: Russia; Belarus; Ukraine; United States; Romania; Israel
- Language: Yiddish

Brutus (Russian: Брут) is a short film directed by Konstantin Fam of 2015, the second novel of the film trilogy "Witnesses" and the sequel of the "Shoes", dedicated to the memory of Holocaust victims.

== Plot ==
Brutus continues the concept of the Witnesses trilogy and tells the story of the Holocaust through the eyes of a German Shepherd dog named Brutus. The Nuremberg Laws have separated the dog from his favourite mistress, a Jewish woman. In the process of training and taming, Brutus becomes a concentration camp beast-killer. The film is based on a novel by the Czech writer Ludvik Ashkenazy.

== Crew ==
- Director: Konstantin Fam
- Composer: Egor Romanenko
- Producers: Konstantin Fam, Ian Fisher Romanovsky, Alexey A. Petruhin, Yuri Igrusha, Egor Odintsov
- Script: Konstantin Fam
- Cinematography: Giora Bejach

== Cast ==
- Oksana Fandera- Rosanna
- Filipp Yankovsky - Horst
- Vladimir Koshevoi - Leo
- Anna Churina - Clara
- Maria Zykova - Ada
- Marta Drozdova - Martha

== Production ==
Filmmakers from Russia, Romania, Israel, the United States, Moldova, Belarus and the Czech Republic participated in the production.

The film was created with the financial support of the Ministry for Culture of Russia, as well as private philanthropists.

== Art features ==
The crew used a variety of filming techniques. The main aim was to show the events through the dog's eyes.

Konstantin Fam:

-Our film will be tough, but entirely pacifist in nature. My task is to make the viewer see things from the dog’s point of view, to show how quickly somebody can be brainwashed and turn into a monster

== Confession ==
Film premiered at the Moscow International Film Festival in June 2016.

== Accolades ==
=== Awards ===
- The Nevada International Film Festival (USA), Experimental Film Competition, Platinum Reel Award Winner (2016)
- Sochi International Film Awards (Russia), Special Prize (2016)
- Film was longlisted to the 89th Academy Awards by Academy Award for Live Action Short Film (USA)
- The Golden Eagle Award of National Academy of Motion Pictures Arts and Sciences of Russia (Russia)
- Best Shorts Competition - "Best Jewish film" (USA)

=== Participations ===
- Hong Kong World International Film Festival (Hong Kong)
- International Filmmaker Festival of World Cinema London (UK)
- Sedona Film Festival (USA)
- PUFF Film Festival Hong Kong
- Best Shorts Competition (USA)
- New Haven International Film Festival (USA)

== Official partners ==
- Federation of Jewish Communities of Russia
- Documentary Film Center
- Youth Center of the Union of Cinematographers of the Russian Federation
- ROSKINO

== See also ==
- Witnesses (2018 film)
- Shoes (2012 film)
- Violin (2017 film)
