= Lenn Kudrjawizki =

German actor and musician (born 1975)

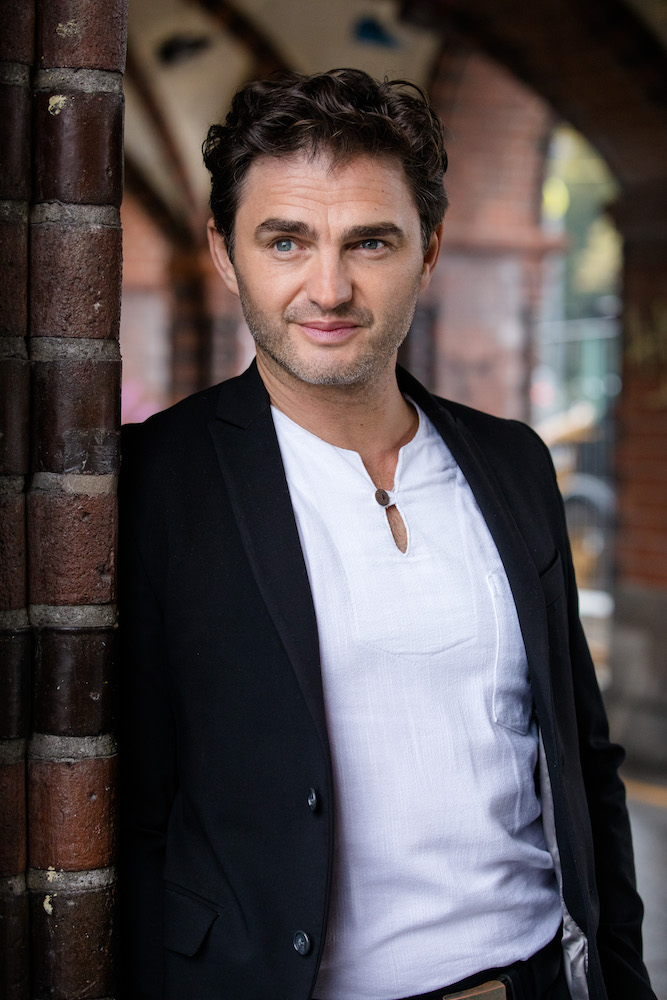
- Kudrjawizki in 2020
- Born: 10 October 1975 (age 50); Leningrad, Russian SFSR, Soviet Union (now Saint Petersburg, Russia)
- Occupation: Actor
- Years active: 1996–present

Lenn Kudrjawizki (born 10 October 1975) is a German actor and musician.

== Biography ==
Lenn Kudrjawizki came with his parents at the age of two months from Leningrad to East Berlin, where his Ukrainian father had a job as a scientist and his mother worked as an interpreter. He discovered violin playing and at the age of 6 he was on stage with the Leningrad State Ballet. He attended an artistic high school, where he received acting, singing and violin lessons. In Dresden he finally studied violin.

From 2001 to 2006 Kudrjawizki was part of the permanent ensemble of the RTL series Abschnitt 40. At the same time, he took part in various cinema and television productions, such as PiperMint, in the Oscar-winning film The Counterfeiters by Stefan Ruzowitzky, in Pope Joan, the Paramount production Jack Ryan: Shadow Recruit, alongside Kevin Costner and directed by Kenneth Branagh, The Transporter Refueled – produced and written by Luc Besson and as a commissioner in the ARD series Der Kroatien-Krimi. He is a board member of the German Film Academy. His first work as an author, Familienbande, published by Fischer Verlag, became a best-seller.

== Filmography ==
- Katrin und Wladimir (1996, TV Movie) – Wladimir
- Tatort (1998–2020, TV Series) – David Kovacic / Milan / Sergej Litvin / Schakir
- Die Cleveren (1999, TV Series)
- Die Entführung (1999, TV Movie)
- England! (2000)
- Enemy at the Gates (2001) – Comrade in Train
- Abschnitt 40 (2001–2006, TV Series) – Polizeimeister Grischa Kaspin
- Die achte Todsünde: Toskana-Karussell (2002)
- Kiki und Tiger (2003, Short) – Tiger
- PiperMint (2004) – Luka
- Such mich nicht (2004) – Barkeeper Hotel
- Queen of Cherries (2004, TV Mini-Series)
- Alarm für Cobra 11 – Die Autobahnpolizei (2005–2012, TV Series) – Juri Orlow / Strack
- Große Lügen (2007) – Morgentau
- The Counterfeiters (2007) – Loszek
- Bezaubernde Marie (2007, TV Movie) – André Weber
- Seven Days Sunday (2007) – Police Officer Lupo
- Today Is My Day (2007, Short) – Paul
- Kommissar Stolberg (2007, TV Series) – Philip Schröder
- GSG 9 – Ihr Einsatz ist ihr Leben (2007–2008, TV Series) – Ilyas Balassanjan / Lew Dukin
- Thank You Mr. President (2008, Documentary)
- Die Zeit, die man Leben nennt (2008, TV Movie) – Juri
- Pope Joan (2009) – Jordanes
- Schicksalsjahre (2011, TV Series) – Wladimir Konsolow
- Die letzte Lüge (2011) – Armin
- The Man with the Bassoon (2011, TV Movie) – Aljoscha Kasajev (as a Young Man) / Sergej Kasajev
- Notruf Hafenkante (2011, TV Series) – Manfred Gradka
- Die Draufgänger (2012, TV Series) – Priester
- Polizeiruf 110 (2012, TV Series) – Bogdan Kuljakow
- Jack Ryan: Shadow Recruit (2014) – Constantin
- Heldt (2014, TV Series) – Marek
- Ein starkes Team (2014, TV Series)
- Business As Usual – Der Prophet fliegt mit (2014)
- Starfighter (2015, TV Movie) – Assistant Stevens
- The Transporter Refueled (2015) – Leo Imasova
- Occupied (2015, TV Series) – Orlov
- Vor der Morgenröte (2016) – Samuel Malamud
- Berlin Station (2016, TV Series) – Zoltan Vasile
- Der Kroatien-Krimi (2016–2021, TV Series) – Emil Perica
- Violin (2017, Short) – Leon
- Witnesses (2018) – 'Skripka' – Leon
- Kaddish (2019) – Leonid
- Traumfabrik (2019) – Jurij
- Vikings (2019–2020, TV Series) – Prince Dir
- World On Fire (2019)
- Unorthodox (2020, TV Mini-Series) – Igor
- Der Kroatien-Krimi (2021, TV Series) – Emil Perica
- Babylon Berlin (2021, TV Series)
- Jack Ryan (2021, TV Series)
- Constellation (TV series)
- Star City (TV series) (2026, TV Series)
