= Shoes (2012 film) =

- Directed by: Konstantin Fam
- Written by: Konstantin Fam
- Produced by: Konstantin Fam; Uriy Igrushа; Miсhail Bykov; Alex A. Petruhin; Tanya Dovidovskaya; Krzysztof Wiech; Tania Rakhmanova; Alexey Timofeev; Aleksandr Kulikov; Igor Lopatenok
- Starring: Uliana Elina; Tatiana Spyrgyash; Ilya Uglava; Alexander Bokovets
- Cinematography: Asen Shopov; Sergey Novikov; Otabek Djuraev; Marec Gajczak
- Music by: Egor Romanenko
- Release date: 2012
- Running time: 20 minutes
- Countries: Russia; Belarus; Poland; Czech Republic; France
- Budget: closed

Shoes is a 2012 international short film directed, written and produced by Konstantin Fam. The film is the result of a joint effort by professional team from Russia, the USA, the Czech Republic, Poland, France, Belarus and Ukraine. The film is the first novel of the film trilogy "Witnesses" dedicated to the memory of victims of the Holocaust. It was the only nominee from Russia for the Academy Awards in the short film category in 2013.

== Plot ==
The first installment traces the personal history of a Jewish girl in 1930s-1940s from the point of view of a pair of red shoes. Starting from the shop window where the shoes were purchased and ending at a mountain of discarded shoes of the victims in a mass grave of the Auschwitz concentration camp.

== Film crew ==
- Original idea: Dmitry Parshkov (Russia)
- Director: Konstantin Fam (Russia)
- Writer: Konstantin Fam (Russia)
- Composer: Egor Romanenko (Ukraine)
- Actors: Uliana Elina (Czech Republic), Tatiana Spyrgyash (Belarus) - Woman; Ilya Uglava (Czech Republic), Alexander Bokovets (Belarus) - Man
- Producers: Konstantin Fam, Uriy Igrushа, Miсhail Bykov, Alex A. Petruhin, Tanya Dovidovskaya, Krzysztof Wiech, Tania Rakhmanova, Alexey * Timofeev, Aleksandr Kulikov, Igor Lopatonok
- Cameramen: Asen Shopov (Czech Republic), Sergey Novikov (Belarus), Dzmitry Shulpin (Belarus), Otabek Djuraev (France), Marec Gajczak (Poland)
- Production designer: Philip Lagunovich-Cherepko (Belarus), Jarmila Konecna (Czech Republic)

== Art features ==
The main object in a shot is a pair of the shoes. There are no dialogues in a shot and we see no human faces but only their shoes. The film is accompanied by an original soundtrack inspired by Jewish folk motives.

== Cultural effect ==
In 2013 the Deputy Director of Peter the Great Museum of Anthropology and Ethnography Efim Rezvan on behalf of the Museum presented the film an honorary diploma from "for bright creative contribution to the museum's exhibition program and the preservation of memory". Together with the Department of Human Rights and the Department of Education Nuremberg plans to create an educational program for school children in Germany.

== Accolades ==
=== Awards ===
- Monaco International Film Festival (Monaco), Best Short Film, Best Director, Best Original Music, Best Producer, Best Cinematographer, Angel Peace Award
- Grand Prix Video Festival Imperia (Italy)
- Pitching project was held at the 65th Cannes Film Festival
- The film is invited to a collection of Yad Vashem (Israel) reference number is V-6195
- Radiant Angel Festival (Russia), Best Live Action Short Film Award
- Artkino Festival (Russia), The best experimental film Award
- 1st place of the festival "Vstrechi na Vjatke" (Russia, Kirov)
- Special prize magazine "NewMag", the festival "Golden Apricot" (Armenia)
- Festival KONIK (Russia), the prize For the contribution to the short film development in Russia
- Festival KONIK (Russia), the prize For the musical solution
- Opening Film Festival special program in Haifa (Israel)

=== Participations ===
- Russian Cinema Week (Israel)
- Doors to Russian Cinema (USA)
- Clermont-Ferrand (France)
- Listapad (Belarus)
- Badalona (Spain)
- Coniminuticontati (Italy)
- Atlanta Jewish Film Festival (USA)
- St. Anne (Russia)
- Kinotaur (Sochi)
- Kinolikbez (Barnaul)
- Kinoshock (Anapa)
- Short (Kaliningrad)
- Konik (Moscow) - Moscow Premiere film closing

== Official partners ==
- Federation of Jewish Communities of Russia
- Documentary Film Center
- Youth Center of the Russian Cinema Union
- Roskino
- Belarusian Ministry of Culture.

== See also ==
- Witnesses (2018 film)
- Brutus (2016 film)
- Violin (2017 film)
