= Moscow Jewish Film Festival =

Film festival

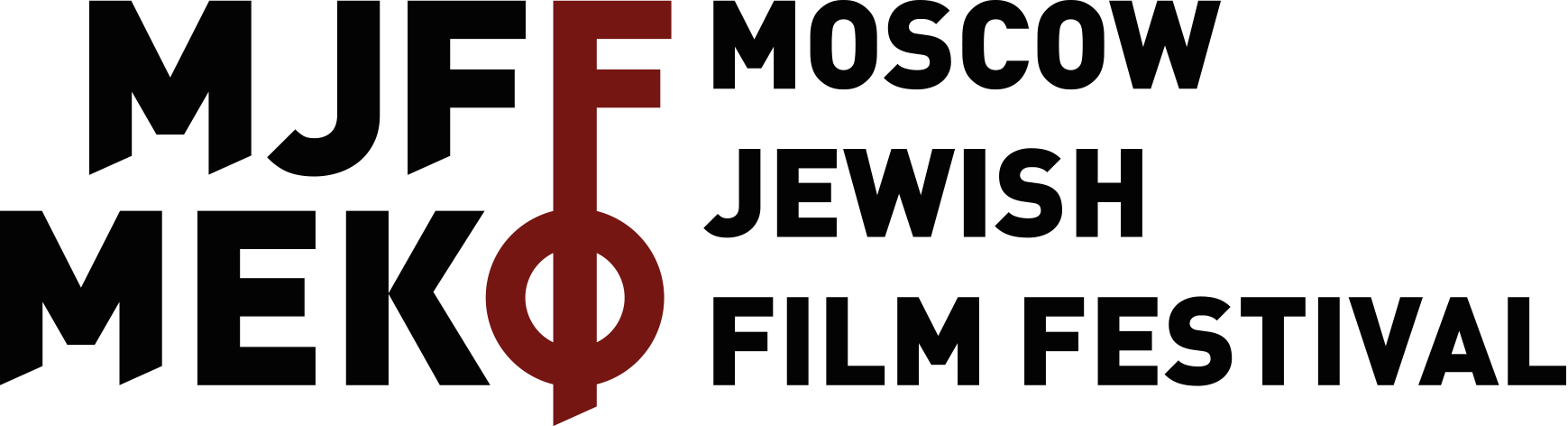

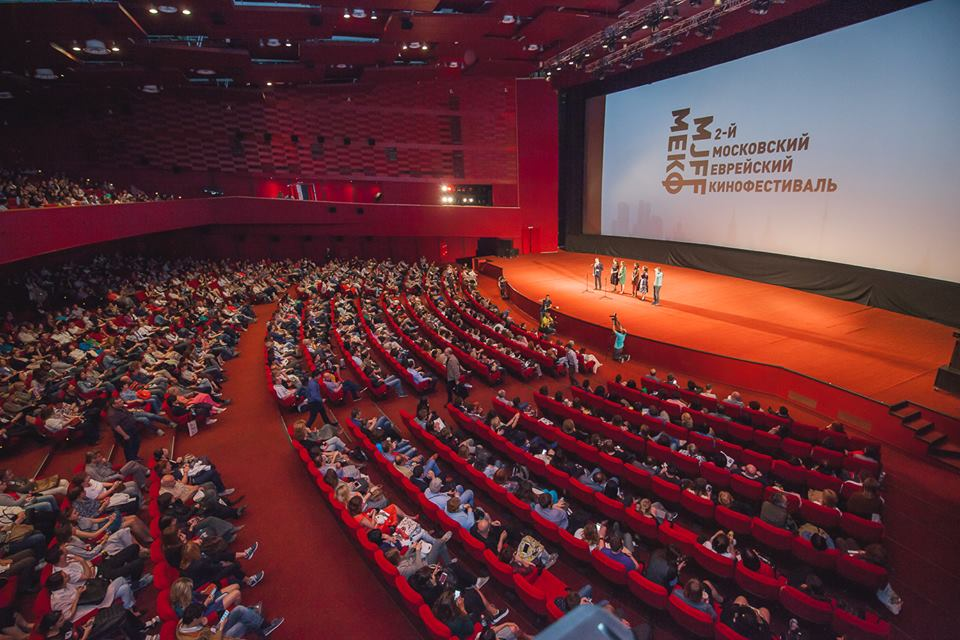
- Location: Moscow, Russia
- Founded: 2015
- Festival date: June
- Website: www.mjff.ru

The Moscow Jewish Film Festival is an annual international film festival. It aims to gather in the program features, documentaries, shorts and animated films on the subject of Jewish culture, history and national identity and contemporary problems. In 2015, Moscow joined a list of cities that celebrate this festival.

== History ==
A precursor to the festival was a Jewish film festival held in Moscow in 1990, as an offshoot of the San Francisco Jewish Film Festival. The San Francisco festival directors Deborah Kaufman and Janis Plotkin, presented a week of films at the festival, the largest Jewish cultural event in the history of the Soviet Union. The festival faced issues with Moscow city official refusing to rent out movie theaters for the festival, citing fear of demonstrations from ultra-right nationalists. Kaufman and Plot, who had raised $225,000 for the festival appealed to senators Alan Cranston, Pete Wilson and Ron Dellums, member of the Member of the U.S. House of Representatives to resolve the crisis. The festival was ultimately housed at four large movie theatres in the city. The festival included screenings of Louis Malle's Au Revoir Les Enfants, Paul Mazursky's Enemies, A Love Story (based on the novel of the same name by Isaac Bashevis Singer, Joan Micklin Silver's Crossing Delancey,. The documentary, Isaac in America: A Journey with Isaac Bashevis Singer, was also shown.

=== 2015 ===
The first Moscow Jewish Film Festival was held from June 14 to 17, 2015, at Moscow's Jewish Museum and Tolerance Center, a Documentary film center and cinema GUM. The festival was organized by Vanya Bowden, Rusina Lekuh, and Egor Odintsov. Sponsored by the Federation of Jewish Communities of Russia, the Jewish Museum and Tolerance Center, Jewish Agency for Israel, UJA-Federation of New York, Roskino, and Ark Pictures. The jury was chaired by writer-director Konstantin Fam, and the other members were Rabbi Alexander Boroda, president of the Federation of Jewish Communities of Russia; Catherine Mtsituridze, television presenter, film critic and head of Roskino; Alexander Kott, director, screenwriter and producer, and Ruslan Sorokin - writer and producer. The festival program included 21 films. The total number of people who attended screenings and educational events of the Festival exceeded 2,500.

=== 2016 ===
The second Moscow Jewish Film Festival was held in Moscow from 14 to 21 June 2016, at the Jewish Museum and Tolerance Center, the Documentary film center, cinema GUM. and KARO 11 cinema Oktyabr. The festival opened with a film called A Tale of Love and Darkness directed by Natalie Portman. The jury was chaired by film director and screenwriter Alexander Mitta. The festival program included thirty five films. The total number of people who attended screenings and educational events of the Festival exceeded five thousand.

=== 2017 ===
The third Moscow Jewish Film Festival was held in Moscow from 12 to 20 June 2017, at the Jewish Museum and Tolerance Center, the Documentary film center, cinema GUM and KARO 11 cinema Oktyabr. The jury was chaired by director, screenwriter and producer Pavel Lungin. The opening film of the festival was The Bloom of Yesterday directed by Chris Kraus. The film was presented by famous German actor Lars Eidinger. The opening ceremony was held in Oktyabr cinema gathering about 1,600 spectators. The festival program included forty nine films. The total number of people who attended screenings and educational events of the Festival exceeded eight thousand.

=== 2018 ===
The fourth Moscow Jewish Film Festival was held in Moscow from 22 to 30 May 2018, at the Jewish Museum and Tolerance Center, Documentary Film Center, cinema GUM, KARO 11 cinema Oktyabr, Moskino Zvezda and Garage Screen Summer Cinema. The jury was chaired by Alexander Rodnyansky, producer of TV-shows and feature films, member of the Academy of Motion Picture Arts and Sciences, founder of the first independent Ukrainian TV channel 1+1, CEO of CTC Media broadcasting company. The opening film of the festival was Denial directed by Mick Jackson. The welcome speech at the Opening ceremony was held by the President of Jury Alexander Rodnyansky and famous American director and producer Brett Ratner. The ceremony was held in cinema Oktyabr which gathered about 1,600 spectators. The festival program included fifty three films. The total number of people who attended screenings and educational events of the Festival exceeded eight thousand.

=== 2019 ===
The fifth Moscow Jewish Film Festival was held in Moscow from 23 to 30 June 2019 at the Jewish Museum and Tolerance Center, Documentary Film Center, cinema GUM, KARO 11 cinema Oktyabr, Moskino Zvezda, Moskino Kosmos, Knizhniki and Moscow Jewish Community Center. The jury was chaired by Timur Weinstein, general producer of the NTV television company, member of the International Academy of EMMY, Academy of Russian Television, Russian Academy of Cinematographic Arts. The welcome speech at the Opening ceremony was held by the President of Jury Timur Weinstein and American director Shawn Snyder, who presented his film To Dust as the Russian premiere and the opening film of the 5th Moscow Jewish Film Festival. The festival program included fifty eight films. The total number of people who attended screenings and educational events of the Festival exceeded eight and a half thousand.

== Organizers ==
The organizer of the Moscow Jewish Film Festival is the Ark Foundation for the Support and Development of Jewish Cinema. The Ark Foundation was created with the aim of developing Jewish culture and preserving history, as well as promoting the ideas of humanism, tolerance and equality through the creation and distribution of cinematographic works and the organization of events in the field of cinema.

=== Management of the festival ===
- CEO and Producer — Egor Odintsov
- Producer — Diana Nadarova
- Narrative Film Program Curator — Sergey Sdobnov
- Documentary Film Program Curator — Egor Sennikov
- Educational Director — Mikhail Libkin
- Media Director - Anna Gorodetskaya.

== Film submissions ==
To be considered for exhibition, submissions must have relevance to Jewish themes, issues, history, heritage, and culture. The festival accepts the following film types: narrative feature, documentary feature, narrative short, and documentary short.

== Jury ==
The decision on awarding the prizes of the festival is taken by the jury, whose composition is determined by the Directorate of the festival. The jury consists of the leading masters of world cinema: directors, actors, and critics. The jury is headed by the president of the jury.

The members of the Festival jury in different years were Soviet and Russian film director, screenwriter, and actor Alexander Mitta, Rabbi, President of the Federation of Jewish Communities of Russia Alexander Boroda, film directors Pavel Lungin, Sergei Mokritskiy, Dmitry Astrakhan, Konstantin Fam and Alexander Kott, producers Alexander Ageyev and Ruslan Sorokin, director of the Documentary film center Sofya Kapkova, TV presenter, film critic and film critic Catherine Mtsituridze and others.

== Public Council ==
A public council, created in 2017, continued its work and included the following filmmakers and leaders of the Jewish community:

- Alexander Boroda — Rabbi, the President of the Federation of Jewish Communities of Russia, Founder and General Director of the Jewish Museum and Tolerance Center, a member of the Civic Chamber of the Russian Federation
- Yuri Kanner — President of Russian Jewish Congress, Vice President and member of the steering committee of World Jewish Congress
- Mikhail Gusman — Journalist, First deputy director general of ITAR-TASS, recipient of the Russian State Prize, Honored Journalist of the Russian Federation.
- Boruch Gorin — Journalist, publisher
- Dorit Golender — diplomat, public figure, former Plenipotentiary Ambassador of the State of Israel in the Russian Federation (2010-2015)
- Alexander Mitta — film director, screenwriter
- Svetlana Maksimchenko — Producer, Moskino General Director and Executive Secretary of Moscow Film Commission.
- Susanna Alperina — journalist, writer

== Awards ==
The award of the MJFF is called the "Key to Discoveries". The statuette symbolizes the place of the Jewish culture at the intersection of interaction between different countries and nationalities.

The Jury awards the "Key to Discoveries" in the following categories:

- Best Film
- Best Documentary Feature Film
- Best Narrative Short Film
- Best Documentary Short Film
- Jury Prize — awarded to any picture that is part of the competition by Jury’s choice.
- Honorary Award "For outstanding contribution to the development of the Jewish cinema in Russia'' — awarded by The Public Council of the Festival
- Since 2015 the family of producer Yakov Kaller (1946–2017) have been giving out the special Yakov Kaller Award to the best Russian Jewish-themed film.

== Education ==
The educational program of the Moscow Jewish Film Festival includes lectures, discussions and workshops that aim at understanding whether there exists a unique language of Jewish cinematography, and what it is made of, when it appeared, how it was developing and is being influenced by modernity; what images have been and are being created through that language and who is that hero that was born by the Jewish culture and sang by its cinematography. The Festival organizes conversations with creators of the films, film experts, writers, theologians, musicians, and with each other.

In different years the lecturers were Shakespearian and theater historian Aleksei Bartoshevich, researcher of Jewish thought Uri Gershovich, musicologist Lyalya Kandaurova, religious scholar and historian Yuri Tabak, cinematographer Valery Davydov, Russian philosopher Igor Chubarov, flash fiction author, poet and essayist Linor Goralik, director and screenwriter Oleg Dorman, film critic Valery Davydov, Alexander Bartosiewicz, Alexander Mitta, Lyudmila Ulitskaya, the lead actor in the movie Son of Saul Géza Röhrig, film director and screenwriter Andrei Konchalovsky, Russian artist Nikolay Polissky, the son of Yitzhak Rabin - Yuval Rabin, film director Amir Yatsiv and others.

== Impact ==
Moscow Jewish Film Festival is attracting new audiences in order to create a better connection with Jewish culture and the Jewish cultural community. The Festival contributes to positive positioning of the Jewish community in the non-Jewish world. The growing interest from the audience confirmed the success of the festival and its events; by increasing the number of the audience and by the consistent interest shown towards the Festival by media and film industry representatives, both in Russia and worldwide. Most of the films presented at the festival were shown in Russia for the first time. Most part of the festival screenings are Russian premieres of the films.

We gladly support the Moscow Jewish Film Festival and are determined to extend this partnership, for we consider it to be important not only for the Russian Jewish Community, but for the country as a whole. The Festivals contributes significantly into establishing peace between nations and confessions.

— Yuri Kanner, President of the Russian Jewish Congress

Films that talk about Jewish themes are a great contribution into dialogue between cultures, which is undoubtedly important for a multinational country that Russia is.

— Alexander Boroda, President of the President of the Federation of Jewish Communities of Russia, General Director and founder of the Jewish Museum and Tolerance Center, member of the Civic Chamber of Russia

== Partners ==
- Federation of Jewish Communities of Russia

== See also ==
- Ekaterinburg Jewish Film Festival
