= Arkady Ukupnik =

Russian composer

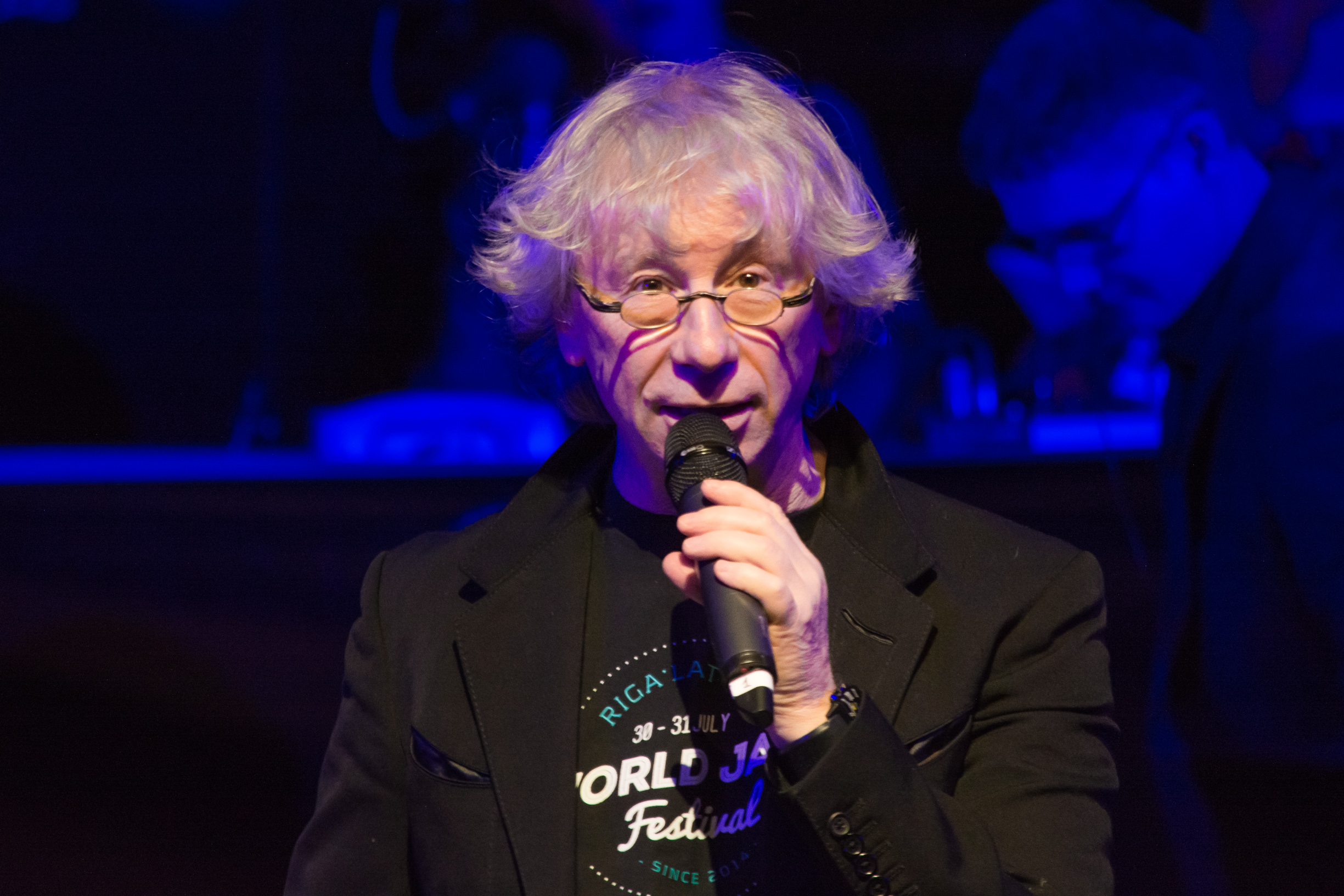

Arkady Semyonovich Ukupnik (Russian: Арка́дий Семёнович Уку́пник; born February 18, 1953, Kamianets-Podilskyi, Khmelnytskyi Oblast, Ukrainian Soviet Socialist Republic) is a Russian composer, pop singer, actor, and producer.

Honoured Artist of Russia (2004).

In 2017 he became a member of the jury of 3rd Moscow Jewish Film Festival.

== Selected filmography ==
- Moths Games (2004)
- Kiss through a Wall (2011)
- All Inclusive (2011)
