= Kristina Krasnyanskaya =

Russian art historian, curator, and gallery owner

- Born: Kristina Georgievna Krasnyanskaya; Kyiv, Ukrainian SSR, Soviet Union
- Education: MGIMO
- Occupations: Art historian, curator, gallerist
- Known for: Executive Director of the Jewish Museum and Tolerance Center, founder of Heritage International Art Gallery

Kristina Georgievna Krasnyanskaya is a Russian art historian, curator, founder of the Heritage International Art Gallery, and executive director of the Jewish Museum and Tolerance Center (2021–2026). She is also a curator and the head of the board of trustees of MOMus–Museum of Modern Art–Costakis Collection in Thessaloniki, Greece (since 2018).

Krasnyanskaya was the first to present Soviet experimental design at the international design forum Design Miami/Basel in 2012. She has curated numerous design and art exhibitions in museums across Russia and internationally. She is the co-author of the book Soviet Design: From Constructivism to Modernism. 1920–1980 (published in 2020 by Scheidegger & Spiess) and the co-founder of Manner & Matter, an information resource dedicated to Russian design.

== Biography ==
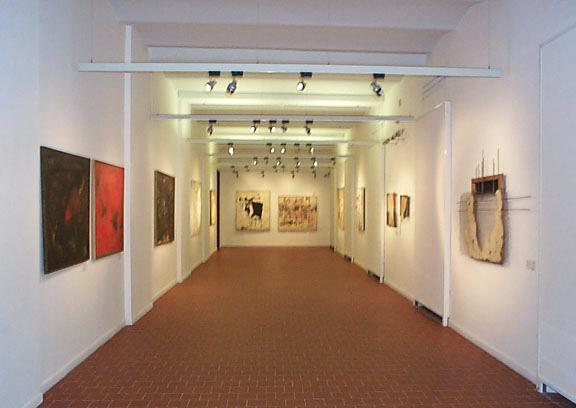
MOMus–Museum of Modern Art–Costakis Collection, curated by Krasnyanskaya, in Thessaloniki, Greece

Kristina Krasnyanskaya was born in Kyiv to engineer Georgy Leonidovich Krasnyansky and Olga Leonidovna Krasnyanskaya. She graduated from the Faculty of Economics at Moscow State Institute of International Relations (MGIMO) and the Institute of Cultural Enlightenment "Kultprosvet", where in 2007, she defended a thesis titled "Color and Light in the Works of the Russian Emigre Artist André Lanskoy".

In 2006, Krasnyanskaya founded her own art gallery, Heritage, which has been located on Petrovka Street in Moscow since February 2008. The gallery's inaugural project was a retrospective exhibition of André Lanskoy, showcasing his early primitivist works, collages, abstract paintings, and book illustrations. In 2012, she introduced Soviet experimental design to the international stage at the Design Miami/Basel exhibition.

In 2018, Krasnyanskaya became the head of the board of trustees of MOMus – Museum of Modern Art – Costakis Collection in Thessaloniki, Greece.

In 2021, she was appointed executive director of the Jewish Museum and Tolerance Center in Moscow (worked until 2026).

== Projects ==
Kristina Krasnyanskaya has curated a number of major international exhibitions at her own art gallery, Heritage, as well as at the Shchusev Museum of Architecture, the All-Russian Museum of Decorative Arts, the State Archaeological Museum of Naples, the Museo Arte Gallarate (MAGA), and the Museum of Modern Art – Costakis Collection. Over the years, she has curated exhibitions at Design Miami/Basel, Art Paris, ArtFactory Istanbul, Contemporary Istanbul, and Nomad Monaco.
