= Gennady Gazin =

Ukrainian businessman and philanthropist

- Геннадій Газін
- Born: 28 January 1965 (age 61); Zhytomyr, Ukraine
- Education: Wharton School; Stanford University; Cornell University
- Occupations: Businessman; philanthropist

Gennady Gazin (Ukrainian: Геннадій Газін; born 28 January 1965) is a Ukrainian businessman and philanthropist.

== Education ==
Gazin has an MBA from Wharton School of the University of Pennsylvania, a master's degree in electrical engineering from Stanford University and a bachelor's degree in electrical engineering from Cornell University.

== Business ==
Gazin began his career working for Bell Communications Research (now Telcordia Technologies) and General Dynamics in the U.S. as a systems and telecommunications engineer. Gazin moved on to work in McKinsey and Company's New York and Moscow offices, specializing in technology and telecommunications and becoming the firm's senior partner responsible for the CIS region. Gazin was CEO of EastOne from 2007 to 2012 and was invited to speak at the 2011 World Economic Forum. In 2015, he joined the advisory board of LetterOne Technology. In 2020, he was appointed as Chairman of VEON having previously served as vice-chairman of the board at Studio Moderna. Gazin is also an affiliate partner at Lindsay Goldberg, a New York-based private equity firm and co-founder of Swiss Timber International, a Swiss trading company.

== Philanthropy ==
Gennady Gazin is chairman of the Genesis Philanthropy Group, a foundation created to promote Jewish identity among Russian-speaking Jews worldwide, and is a member of the Taglit-Birthright Israel Planning Committee. He actively supports Jewish life in Zhytomyr, the city in Central Ukraine where he was born, and is a founder of the Gazin Family Fund.
