= Congress of the Jewish Religious Organizations and Associations in Russia =

- Конгресс еврейских религиозных организаций и объединений в России
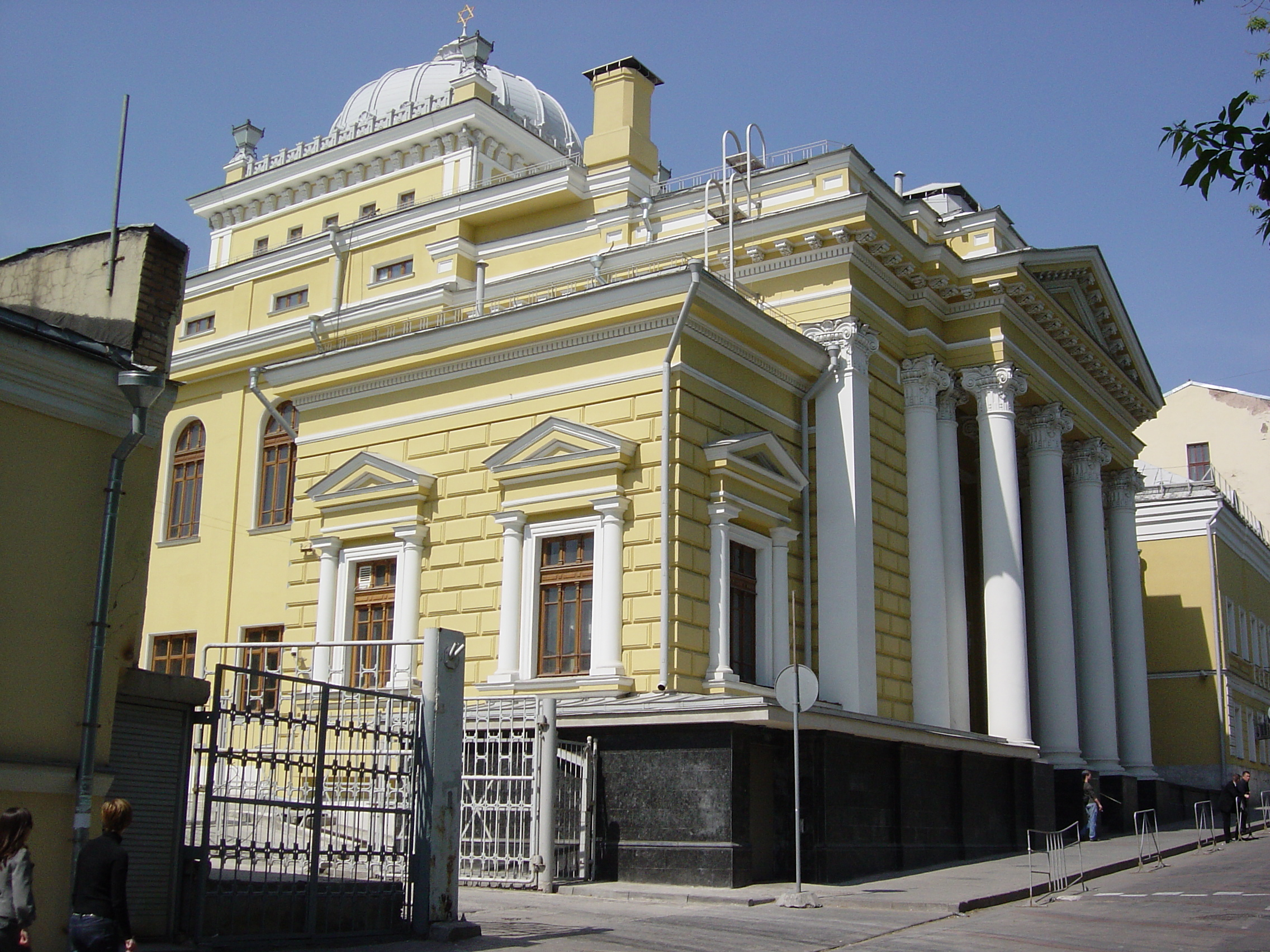
- The Moscow Choral Synagogue
- Formation: 1993 (33 years ago)
- Founded at: Moscow, Russia
- Headquarters: Moscow
- Chief Rabbi of Russia: Adolf Shayevich
- Website: https://keroor.org/

The Congress of the Jewish Religious Organizations and Associations in Russia (CJROAR; Russian: Конгресс еврейских религиозных организаций и объединений в России, КЕРООР, Hebrew: קונגרס הקהילות היהודיות הדתיות ברוסיה) was established in February 1993. The CJROAR links 100 Jewish organizations in 68 Russian cities. One of the two largest Jewish religious organizations in Russia (alongside the Federation of Jewish Communities of Russia), the CJROAR possesses no administrative powers, but rather performs consulting, coordinating and representative functions. Its primary activities are designing and conducting religious seminars, preparing staff for the work in communities, introducing the Jewish population to national traditions, as well as educational and publishing activity.

The organization comprises Orthodox and Reform Jewish communities. Previously, the Congress included all streams of Judaism in Russia.

The administrative bodies of the CJROAR are the Rabbinate and the Public Council. The Executive Committee of the CJROAR is located at the Moscow Choral Synagogue.

== History ==
In 1989, the All-Union Council of Jewish Religious Communities was established, headed by Chief Rabbi of the Soviet Union Adolf Shayevich.

Following the collapse of the Soviet Union, a new nationwide organization was created as the legal successor to the All-Union Council of Jewish Religious Communities. The CJROAR emerged from the community of the Moscow Choral Synagogue and, alongside a number of Orthodox communities from the Russian provinces, also included Reform communities.

In 1995, the Russian Union of Progressive Judaism Associations was formed, later renamed the Association of Religious Organizations of Modern Judaism in Russia (known as the "Progressive Judaism Movement" until 1998). In 1998, the Russian Union of Progressive Judaism Associations communities were registered under the auspices of the CJROAR. Subsequently, the Association of Religious Organizations of Modern Judaism in Russia declared its formal independence from the Congress, but a number of Reform Judaism communities remained within the CJROAR, while still being subordinate to the Association's head Zinovy Kogan. The Association of Religious Organizations of Modern Judaism is the main Russian organization of Reform Judaism.

In 1995, several organizations whose rabbis were "emissaries" of the Lubavitcher Rebbe Menachem Mendel Schneerson left the CJROAR.

The significance of the CJROAR and the FJCR increased sharply following the adoption of the new version of the Freedom of Conscience and Religious Associations law in 1997, which required local religious communities to obtain confirmation from a centralized structure for registration.

The CJROAR became the subject of a request by an initiative group of Russian citizens and the State Duma deputies to the Prosecutor General of Russia Vladimir Ustinov when, in 2001, it published the book Kitzur Shulchan Aruch. In the preface, the then-head of the CJROAR, Rabbi Zinovy Kogan, wrote: "The Editorial Board of the CJROAR deemed it necessary to omit in this translation some halachic instructions…, the inclusion of which in a Russian-language publication would be perceived by the population of Russia… as an unprovoked insult. The reader who wishes to read the 'Kitzur Shulchan Aruch' in a perfectly complete volume is invited to a yeshiva to study this and many other holy books in the original".

In 2016, the official name of the association changed. The CJROAR became known as a "centralized organization of Orthodox Judaism", previously it was a "centralized religious organization".

== Activity ==
At the beginning of the 2006 school year, the CJROAR issued a press-release in which it appealed to Jews of Russia and heads of Jewish communities with a request to inform the Chief Rabbinate about Jewish students being required to study the "Basics of the Christian Orthodox culture", the assignment of examinations in Shabbat and other problems dealing with difficulties in adhering to Jewish religious norms.

The main stated goal and objective of the CJROAR is to create favorable conditions for leading a Jewish way of life, preserving the national identity of Russian Jews, and drawing closer to the Torah.

The CJROAR and the FJCR are more in a state of competitive rivalry with each other. For this reason, two chief rabbis exist simultaneously in Russia. According to a number of experts, the FJCR received a much more significant resource base and influence compared to the CJROAR.

Secular Jewish organizations may align themselves with the policies of either the CJROAR or the FJCR, while the positions of members within many of these associations often diverge, as the composition of most of these structures is quite diverse.

Following the adoption of relevant documents by Russian religious organizations, "The Foundations of the Social Concept of the Russian Orthodox Church" (August 2000) and "The Main Provisions of the Social Program of Russian Muslims" (in the same year), the CJROAR developed a social concept for Russian Jews in 2003.
