= Ekaterinburg Jewish Film Festival =

Annual international film festival in Russia

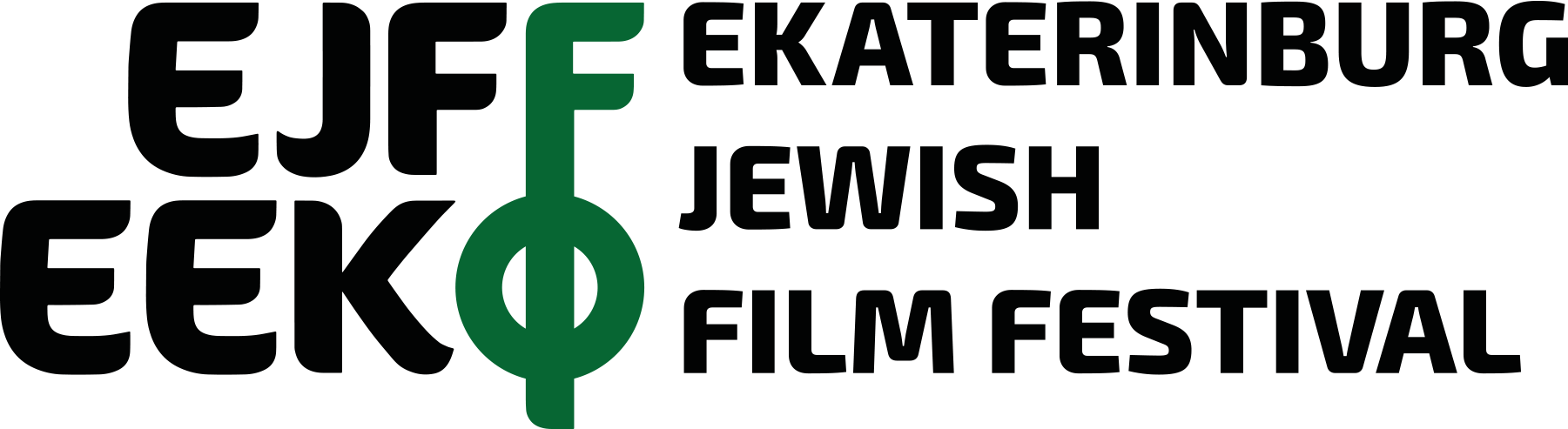
- Location: Ekaterinburg, Russia
- Founded: 2016
- Festival date: November
- Website: www.ejff.ru

The Ekaterinburg Jewish Film Festival is an annual international film festival, which aims to gather in the program features, documentaries, shorts and animated films on the subject of Jewish culture, history and national identity and contemporary problems. The film festival was founded in 2016.

== History ==
=== 2016 ===
The 1st Ekaterinburg Film Festival was held in Ekaterinburg from 20 to 23 November 2016, at the Boris Yeltsin Presidential Center and KARO 10 Rainbow Park. The Festival opened with a film A Tale of Love and Darkness directed by Natalie Portman. The festival program included more than 25 films. The total number of people who attended screenings and educational events of the Festival exceeded 1200.

=== 2017 ===
The 2nd Ekaterinburg Film Festival was held in Ekaterinburg from 18 to 21 November 2016, at the Boris Yeltsin Presidential Center and Dom Kino. The opening ceremony of the Festival took place on November 18, 2017, at Dom Kino. The Jews by the French director Yvan Attal became the opening film of the Festival. The ceremony was attended by Yevgeny Roizman, the Mayor of Ekaterinburg and Vlad Lerner, the First Secretary of the Embassy of Israel in Russia. The festival program included more than 29 films. The total number of people who attended screenings and educational events of the Festival exceeded 2000.

== Creators ==
- General producer — Egor Odintsov
- Program director — Rusina Lekuh (2016), Vanya Bowden (2017)
- Producer — Konstantin Fam
- PR-director — Elena Barkova
- Executive producer — Edita Bleikh

== Education ==
In addition to film screenings, an educational program was organized in the framework of the festival, consisting of lectures, discussions and debates.

In different years the speakers were independent film director, producer, screenwriter Konstantin Fam, film director and producer Artem Vitkin, journalist Boruch Gorin, researcher of Jewish culture Uri Gershovich, film critic Egor Belikov, philosopher Lilia Nemchenko, Doctor of Psychology Ludmila Baranskaya and others.

== Impact ==
Boris Yeltsin Presidential Center, the biggest museum in Eastern Russia and North Asia, became the Festival's partner and served as its venue. More than 3000 people have taken part in events of the Festival, which received wide media coverage.

The 1st Ekaterinburg Jewish Film Festival was definitely held at a high standard. I am certain that the second edition of the Ekaterinburg Jewish Film Festival will attract many excited viewers, and the screenings themselves will become a good tradition in our city.

— Yevgeny Roizman, Mayor of Ekaterinburg

== Partners ==
- Genesis Philanthropy Group
- Federation of Jewish Communities of Russia
- Russian Jewish Congress
- Ark Foundation
- Ekaterinburg City Administration

== See also ==
- Moscow Jewish Film Festival
