= Witnesses (2018 film) =

- Theatrical release poster
- Directed by: Konstantin Fam
- Written by: Konstantin Fam; Maxim Voskoboev; Sergei Rachlin
- Produced by: Konstantin Fam; Alex A. Petruhin; Egor Odintsov; Boris Mints
- Production companies: Russian Film Group; Ark Pictures
- Release date: 2018
- Countries: Russia; Belarus; Ukraine; Poland; France; Czech Republic; Israel

Witnesses is a historical drama directed by Konstantin Fam, consisting of three novellas Shoes, Brutus and Violin, united by a common concept and dedicated to the memory of Holocaust victims. Also known as The Trilogy "Witnesses".

== Concept ==
The aim of the project is the story of the tragic events of 1933–1945 and a reminder to the younger generation of the tragedy with the aim of preventing it in the future.

Konstantin Fam:

-This film I dedicate to the memory of their relatives who were killed or went missing during the Second World War, as well as the memory of the six million victims of the Holocaust. I wholeheartedly wish that such a tragedy does not happen again.

A notable feature of the film is its novel structure and the fact that each of the novels had its own unique stories and history of success on film festivals. "Shoes", "Brutus" and "Violin" - all parts of the film were longlisted for the Academy Award for "Best Live Action Short Film" and became the winners of many Russian and international film festivals.

== History of creation ==
In 2012 it was created the short film Shoes, dedicated to the memory of the Holocaust, which was warmly welcomed by the audience and the festival was a success. The film's director Konstantin Fam, decided to develop the idea of "unusual sight" to the Holocaust and to create a full-length film Witnesses, which in addition to shoes will include two more novels - Brutus and Violin.

Presentation of the trilogy was held at the 66th Cannes Film Festival, which is also under the Short Film Corner, were shown the presentation materials to the novel "Brutus."

The producer group: the Trilogy includes filmmakers from Russia, Belarus, Israel and the United States.

November 9 at the 34th American Film Market held a unique special pitching new projects. Film "Witnesses" with the support ROSKINO became the only Russian project, presented at the pitching.

The film was created with the financial support of the Ministry for Culture of Russia, as well as private philanthropists.

== Shoes ==
Shoes The film is the first novel of the trilogy Witnesses. The film is set in the 1930s-1940s and tells the story of a pair of women's shoes, which story begins in a shop window and was tragically cut short in a mass grave footwear concentration camp "Auschwitz." In the story Shoes is the main character shoes - women's shoes. In the picture is not visible persons and the lack of dialogue. The entire film is accompanied by an original symphonic music.

The shooting of the film took place on the territory of Belarus, Poland, Czech Republic and France. The picture was a success of the festival, both in Russia and abroad.

The only Russian short film nominated for the Academy Award in 2013.

== "Brutus" ==
Events in the film "Brutus" (from a story by Ludvik Ashkenazy) are shown through the dog's eyes. This particular view allows you to see the different human values. War, racial laws, human cruelty have separated a German Shepherd by the name of Brutus with his owner. From kennel it as a watchdog gets to a concentration camp, where in the process of training and psychological manipulation a harmless pet becomes a killer dog. One day Brutus is commanded to chase and kill Jewish escapees, amongst whom he encounters his former owner...

There it was reported that the main role in the film can fulfill one of Hollywood actresses, do not hide their Jewish ancestry - Mila Kunis and Natalie Portman June 27, 2013 "Brutus" won a screenwriting pitching the 35th Moscow International Film Festival and received a grant from the Russian Cinematographers' Union. Of the 418 applications submitted for the competition by the selection committee of the Youth Center made the long list of 22 projects of full-length feature films and television projects and 23 short film project. Special guest and expert Pitching was Nikita Mikhalkov.

The script for "Brutus" wrote Sergei Rachlin - the first Russian journalist, received the Association of the Hollywood Foreign Press, today - the executive secretary of the award "Golden Globe".

Film premiered at the Moscow International Film Festival in June 2016.

== "Violin" ==
World of third novel, Violin, entirely revolves around the unique musical instrument. The third story, "Violin" (from a story by Yossi Tavora) tells about the amazing violin fate, passed through all the horrors of war. The story begins in a violin workshop in Nuremberg, where at the beginning of the 20th century, was created a violin, intended as a gift to the Jewish boy, and ends with a hundred years later concert at the Wailing Wall.

Film premiered as part of the competition program of the 39th Moscow International Film Festival in June 2017. It is also longlisted for the Academy Award for Live Action Short Film and won the award of the name of Vera Glagoleva in Sochi International Film Awards

== Partners ==
- Federation of Jewish Communities of Russia
- Russian Jewish Congress
- Chabad Odesa
- Documentary Film Center
- Youth Center of the Union of Cinematographers of the Russian Federation
- ROSKINO

== See also ==
- Shoes (2012 film)
- Brutus (2016 film)
- Violin (2017 film)
