= Genesis Philanthropy Group =

The Genesis Philanthropy Group (GPG) is a global family of foundations, co-founded by Mikhail Fridman, an international businessman and philanthropist, and his business partners. In 2022 after Russian invasion in Ukraine the EU imposed sanctions on Fridman, who said the EU's allegations were false and defamatory. After that the Charity Commission has opened a statutory inquiry into and frozen the bank account. An interim manager was subsequently appointed.

GPG supports causes which strengthen Jewish identity all over the world, advancing Jewish engagement into the 21st century to create a more diverse and connected global Jewish community.

GPG's work is inspired by its founders’ commitment to:

- strengthening Jewish identity among Russian-speaking Jews worldwide.
- fostering bonds and common understanding between Jews living in Israel and in the Diaspora.
- developing innovative formats geared towards the expansion of Jewish engagement opportunities.
- expanding local and global Jewish connection opportunities in the UK and Spain.

In January 2014, Gennady Gazin was elected chairman of the board. Ilia Salita, the former president and CEO of the foundation, died in June 2020. Marina Yudborovksy was appointed as GPG's new CEO in July 2020.

In partnership with the State of Israel, GPG launched the “Our Common Destiny” initiative in 2019 to strengthen the bonds among Jews worldwide. The Declaration of Our Common Destiny sets out five deeply-held values that unite the Jewish people and was endorsed by Israel's president Reuven Rivlin as a “roadmap for the Jewish future”.
