= Dorit Golender =

Israeli diplomat

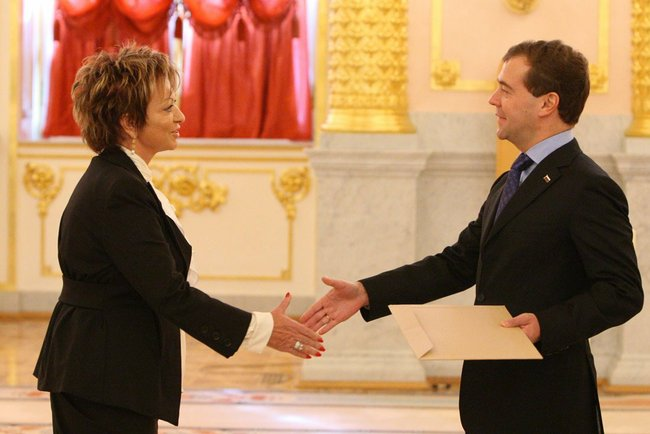

Dorit Golender (Hebrew: דורית גולנדר) is the Vice President of Community Relations for the Genesis Philanthropy Group. She took the position after serving for five years as the Plenipotentiary Ambassador of the State of Israel to the Russian Federation (2010-2015). She also was a broadcast journalist known as Shlomit Lidor to Russian listeners.

Golender is from Vilnius, Lithuania and emigrated to Israel with her family in 1967.

== Career ==
=== Journalism ===
While a student at the Hebrew University of Jerusalem (studying English and Sovietology), Golender began working as an announcer in the Russian Division of the Voice of Israel. She was Director and Chief Editor of Radio REKA for almost 15 years, starting in 1991.
