= National Academy of Motion Pictures Arts and Sciences of Russia =

Official film academy of Russia

The National Academy of Motion Pictures Arts and Sciences of Russia is the official film academy of Russia. Every year it awards the Golden Eagle Award.
