= Konstantin Fam =

Russian filmmaker (born 1972)

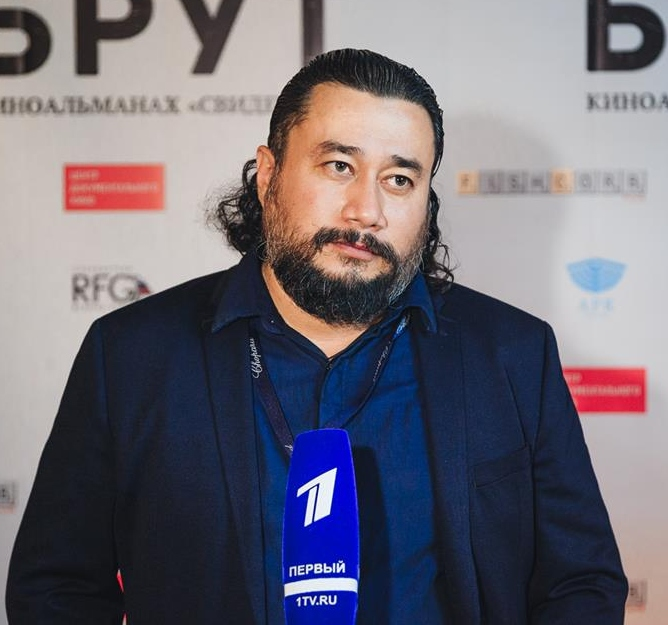
- Born: 13 July 1972 (age 54); Pervomayskiy, Kharkov region, Ukraine
- Education: Gerasimov Institute of Cinematography; New York Film Academy
- Occupation: Filmmaker
- Years active: 1993–present
- Children: 6

Konstantin Kong-Takovich Fam (Russian: Константин Конг-Такович Фам, born 13 July 1972) is a Ukrainian-born independent director, producer, and screenwriter. His film "Shoes", a tribute to the memory of Holocaust victims, was the only Russian short movie nominated for the Academy Awards in 2013.

== Early life ==
Konstantin Fam was born in the town of Pervomayskiy in Kharkiv oblast in Ukrainian SSR. His father, Nguyen (Pham) Kong Tak, a Vietnamese veteran of guerilla wars. After he sought political asylum in the Soviet Union, he was not allowed to live in big cities and the family was under the constant KGB supervision. Fam's mother, Svetlana Naumovna Malkina, was Jewish. The majority of her relatives perished in the Holocaust, and she has been hiding her Jewishness throughout her whole life. His parents' stories influenced Konstantin's creative world outlook.

Konstantin lived in the town of Pervomayskiy until the age of 15 and then entered the Dnipropetrovsk State Theatre School for the Puppetry Arts. Initially, he wished to be in acting classes as puppetry was considered to be a less prestigious theatre form. However, Fam admitted years later that his specialty provided him with the extensive experience in the construction of music, staging, as well as in the ability to animate inanimate objects. Subsequently, this experience was useful when shooting "Shoes".

== Early career ==
After graduation, Fam moved to Tbilisi to work in a theater. After military conflict outbreak in Georgia in 1991, he moved to Chernihiv in Ukraine, where he worked as an actor in a local theater. However, he was typically offered roles that in accordance with his Asian appearance, which didn't match his ambitions. In 1992, he moved to Moscow and started working on television projects.

In 1997, Fam entered Russian State Institute of Cinematography (VGIK), the Course of Screenwriting headed by the great Valentin Yezhov. After two years studying he decided to leave it and concentrate on business development. He started studying film equipment rental, as well as filming TV commercials, advertisements, music videos and image movies. In 1998, he was a writer of children's comic film magazine "Yeralash", as well as a director.

In the 2000s ran a large cinemachinery leasing business also shooting television commercials. During this period, Constantine acted in various production roles, ranging from small roles to producing and directing. The company was closed due to 2008 crisis. Constantine had a dream to earn the necessary amount of money, to shoot a comedy based on his own scenario and start working on his own projects.

== Creative period ==
From the sixteen, Costa has been forming the list of projects he would like to implement. In 2008, he became the second director and screenwriter of the comedy club, Women's League, having worked for two seasons. After this, Konstantin acted as a director of 10 episodes sketch show "Caution: Children!" His love to the sketches Konstantin refers to the manifestation of his national identity. Willing to develop himself as a filmmaker, he entered the NYFA, took all of the film production courses.

=== "Hedgehog" ===
Education ended with 13-week production period, during which a short film based on the story of Grigori Gorin was shot. In the center of the story there is a boy, who changed a winning lottery ticket on the Hedgehog. Boy's father was trying to return the ticket by all means. The story gained the festival success, and then has been invited to many showings. It won the Grand Prix Festival in São Paulo in Brazil. The movie was taken to the Short Film Corner program in Cannes.

=== "Witnesses" ===
"Witnesses" is the first feature film in former Soviet Union produced in memory of the Holocaust victims. Witnesses is the historical drama that consists of three short films Shoes, Brutus and Violin united by the idea to be produced in memory of the greatest tragedy of the 20th century. The project is being elaborated in the memory of the perished people because there is hardly a single Jewish family that didn't lose their loved ones on the run of the mass destruction in the 20th-century catastrophe. The key purpose of the project is to spread the knowledge about the history and to remind the young generation of the tragedy in order to prevent it in the future.

==== "Shoes" ====
The film "Shoes" is the first novel of the trilogy "Witnesses". "Witnesses" is the first feature film in former Soviet Union produced in memory of the Holocaust victims. During the filming Costa has spent four months in Europe. SHOES traces the personal history of a Jewish girl from the point of view of a pair of red shoes. Starting from the shop window where the shoes were purchased and ending at a mountain of discarded shoes of the victims, the viewer witnesses the effects of the tragedy of fascism. The film is the winner of many awards and film festivals, it is invited to the Visual Centre Yad Vashem (Israel), along with the outstanding films about the Holocaust made by Spielberg, Polanski, Benigni. During the 8th International Video Festival Empire (Italy) the film awarded the Gran Prix Silver reel of film as one of the most important in cultural and education spheres. This festival is held under the patronage of UNESCO and listed the 13 most important festivals in the world that support the cultural heritage and education. The festival presents 721 works from 52 countries. Recently Shoes has been qualified for 2013 Academy Award consideration.

==== "Brutus" ====
"Brutus" continues concept of The trilogy "Witnesses" and tells us story of the Holocaust through the eyes of a German Shepherd dog Brutus. The Nuremberg Laws have separated the dog with his favorite mistress, Jewish woman. In the process of training and taming Brutus becomes a concentration camp beast-killer. The film is based on a novel of a Czech writer Ludvik Ashkenazy. Filmmakers from Russia, Romania, Israel, the United States, Moldova, Belarus and the Czech Republic participated in the production. The main roles in the film were performed by Oksana Fandera, Filipp Yankovsky, Vladimir Koshevoy and Anna Churina. The Russian premiere of the film took place in the framework of the competition program Moscow International Film Festival in the summer of 2016. Film was longlisted to the 89th Academy Awards by Academy Award for Live Action Short Film and nominated on The Golden Eagle Award of National Academy of Motion Pictures Arts and Sciences of Russia

==== "Violin" ====
Filming locations were situated in Moscow, New York, Belarus, the Czech Republic and Israel. The main roles were performed by Lenn Kudryavitsky, Oksana Fandera, Vladimir Koshevoi, Vyacheslav Chepurchenko, Mikhail Gorevoy and others. The film was premiered in the summer of 2017.

=== "Kaddish" ===
In this 2019 film, the testament of a former concentration camp prisoner confronts and turns the lives of two young people from different worlds around, shedding light on the tragic history of their family. Filming locations were situated in Moscow, Prague, New York, Jerusalem, and Belarus.

=== Other activity ===
In 2015, Konstantin acted as president of the jury at the 1st Moscow Jewish Film Festival. Subsequently, he joined the team of the festival's creators and from 2016 to 2021 he held the position of one of the film festival's producers.

== Awards and nominations ==
- For the film "Hedgehog" :
  - 2012 – Best Short Film Festival ArtDeco de Cinema, Brazil
  - 2012 – Best feature films of the International Festival of Short Film and Animation "Vision", Russia
- For the film "Shoes" :
  - 2013 – Monaco International Film Festival (Monaco)
  - 2013 – 8th International Video Festival Empire (Italy), Gran Prix Silver reel of film
  - 2013 – Radiant Angel Festival (Russia), Best Live Action Short Film Award
  - 2013 – Artkino Festival (Russia), The best experimental film Award
  - 2013 – International Film Festival Vstreshi na Vjatke (Russia), The 1st prize
  - 2013 – International Film Festival Golden Apricot (Armenia), NewMag Award
  - 2013 – Festival KONIK (Russia), the prize For the contribution to the short film development in Russia
- For the film "Brutus" :
  - 2016 – The Nevada International Film Festival (USA), Experimental Film Competition, Platinum Reel Award Winner (2016)
  - 2016 – Sochi International Film Awards (Russia), Special Prize (2016)
  - 2016 – Film was longlisted to the 89th Academy Awards by Academy Award for Live Action Short Film (USA)
  - 2016 – The Golden Eagle Award of National Academy of Motion Pictures Arts and Sciences of Russia (Russia)
  - 2017 – Best Shorts Competition — "Best Jewish film" (USA)

== Filmography ==
- 2022 – The Land of Sasha, feature film; Producer
- 2020 – Conference, feature film; Producer
- 2019 – Kaddish, feature film; Writer, Director, Producer
- 2018 – Witnesses, feature film; Writer, Director, Producer
- 2017 – Violin, short film; Writer, director, Producer
- 2016 – Brutus, short film; Writer, Director, Producer
- 2013 – Shoes, short film; Writer, Director, Producer
- 2012 – Caution! Children, TV series on channel STS; Director
- 2012 – Hedgehog, short film; Writer, Director, Producer
- 2009–2010 – Women's League seasons 6-7, TV series on TNT; Skit writer, Director
