= Jewish Museum and Tolerance Center =

Museum in Moscow, Russia

- Еврейский музей и центр толерантности
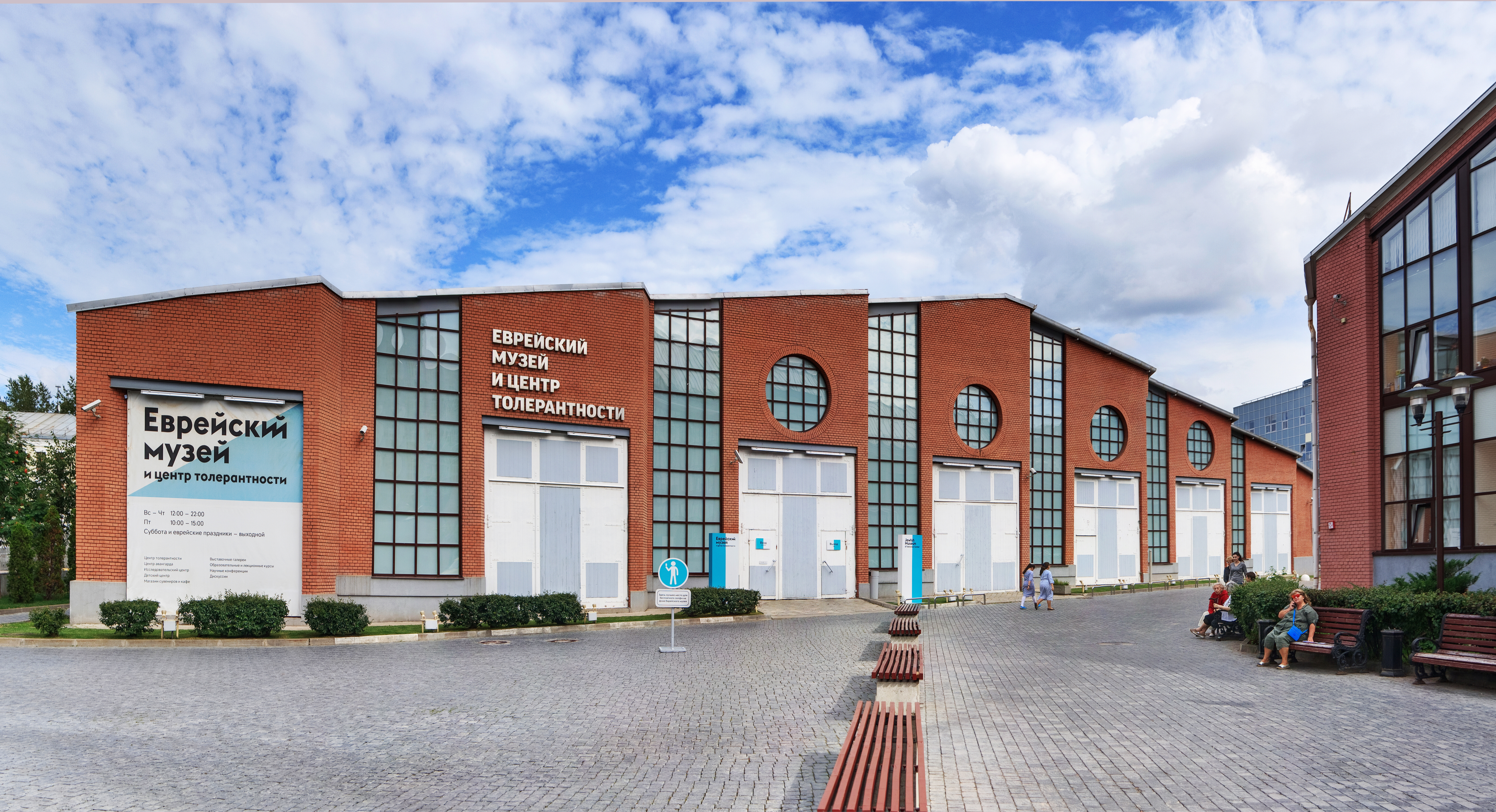
- Established: 8 November 2012
- Location: Obraztsova st., 11 Moscow, Russia
- Coordinates: 55°47′21″N 37°36′29″E
- Director: Aleksandr Boroda
- Public transit access: Marina Roscha
- Website: jewish-museum.ru/en/

The Jewish Museum and Tolerance Center (Russian: Еврейский музей и центр толерантности, romanized: Yevreyskiy muzey i tsentr tolerantnosti; two independent entities) opened in Moscow in November 2012. The establishment of the museum and the center is estimated to have cost $50 million. The museum is in the north-western Moscow neighborhood of Maryina Roscha.

The territory also includes the Children's Center, and the Schneerson Family Library.

== History ==
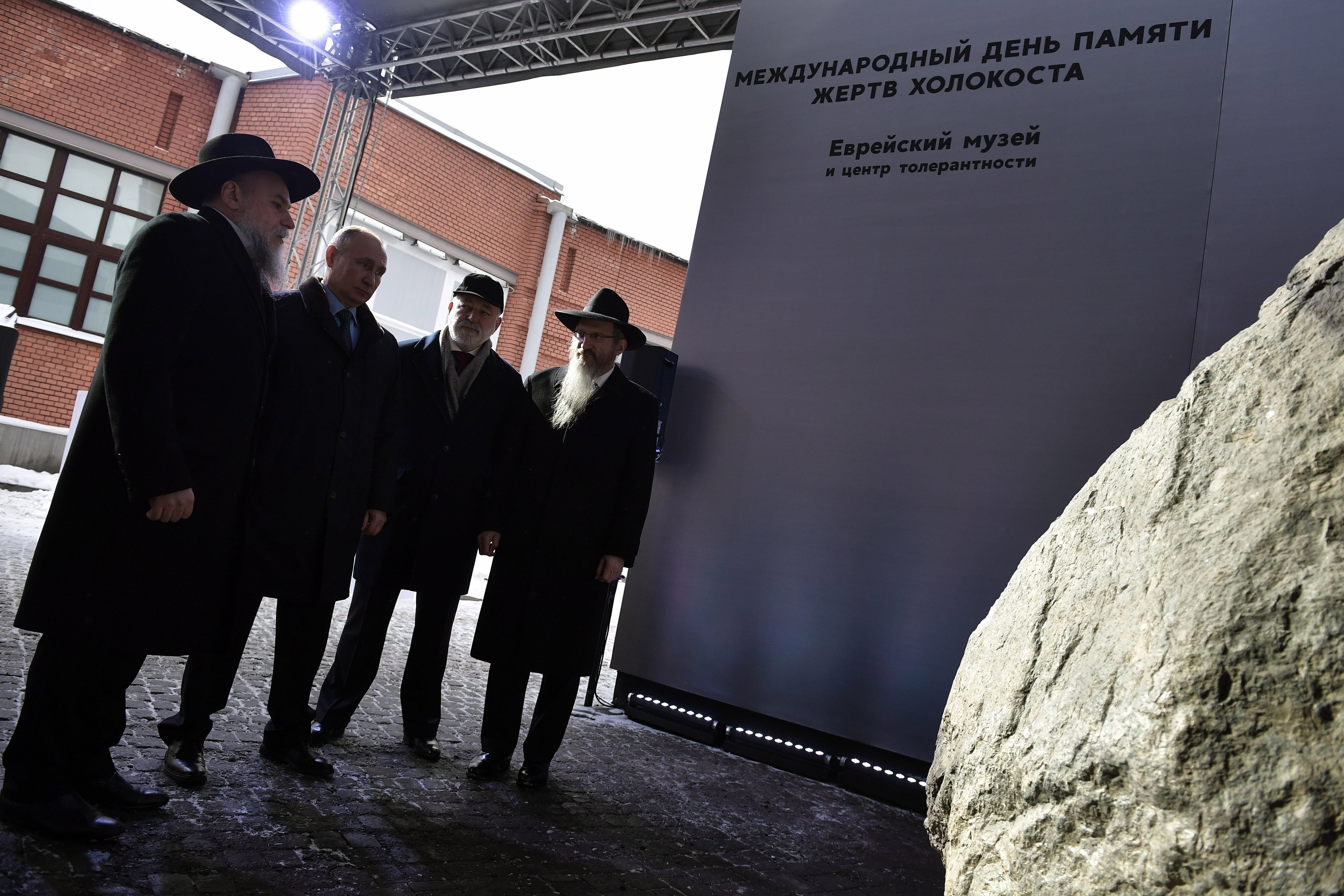
Aleksandr Boroda, Vladimir Putin, Viktor Vekselberg, and Berel Lazar at the entrance to the Museum, 2018

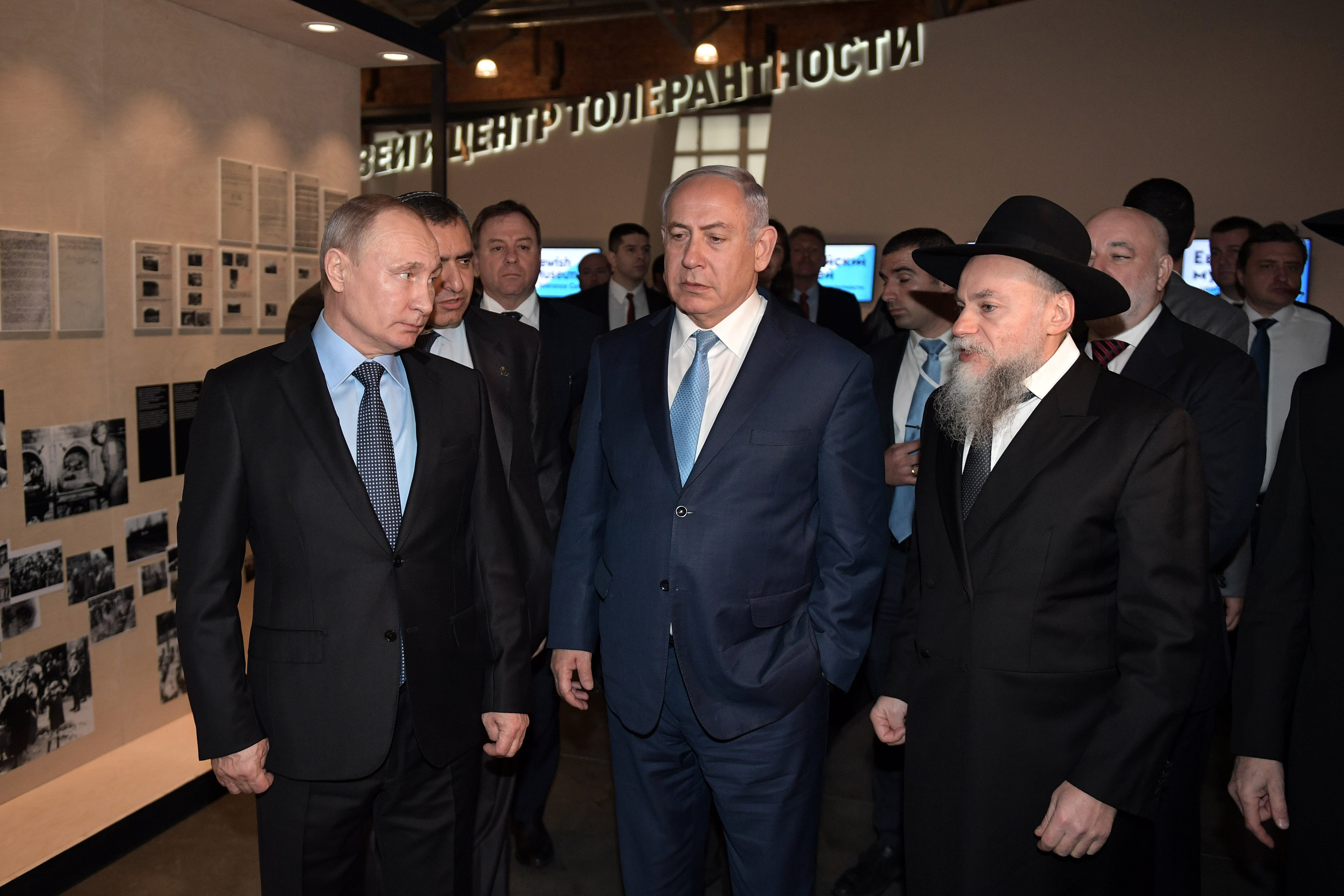
Vladimir Putin and Benjamin Netanyahu at the Museum, 2018

According to a May 2014 article by Alexis Zimberg in the Calvert Journal, the new Jewish Museum occupies the restored Bakhmetevsky Bus Garage. The 8,500-square-metre space is a landmark of the avant-garde 1920s. Designed by architect Konstantin Melnikov and structural engineer Vladimir Shukhov in 1926, the angled parallelogram building went from blueprint to structure in just one year. Vaulted ceilings and clean architectural angles echo an early Soviet mantra: ever higher, comrades, toward the radiant future. Melnikov and Shukhov even designed the interior lighting to resemble slanted rays of sunshine. In the 1990s, a fire left the garage decrepit and dysfunctional. Following mass restoration efforts it re-opened in 2008, initially to house the Garage Centre for Contemporary Culture.

In 2012, thanks to funding from oligarchs like Roman Abramovich and Viktor Vekselberg, from Jewish organisations like Federation of Jewish Communities of Russia and Chabad Lubavitch—and with the support of President Vladimir Putin, who donated one month of his salary towards the construction—the site became home to the nation's largest Jewish museum.

Executive director: Kristina Krasnyanskaya.

== Trustees ==
The board of trustees of the museum includes Viktor Vekselberg, Gennady Timchenko, Len Blavatnik, Roman Abramovich, Vadim Moshkovich, Alex Lichtenfeld, Alexander Klyachin, Mikhail Gutseriev.
