= Federation of Jewish Communities of Russia =

Russian religious organization

- Федерация Еврейских Общин России
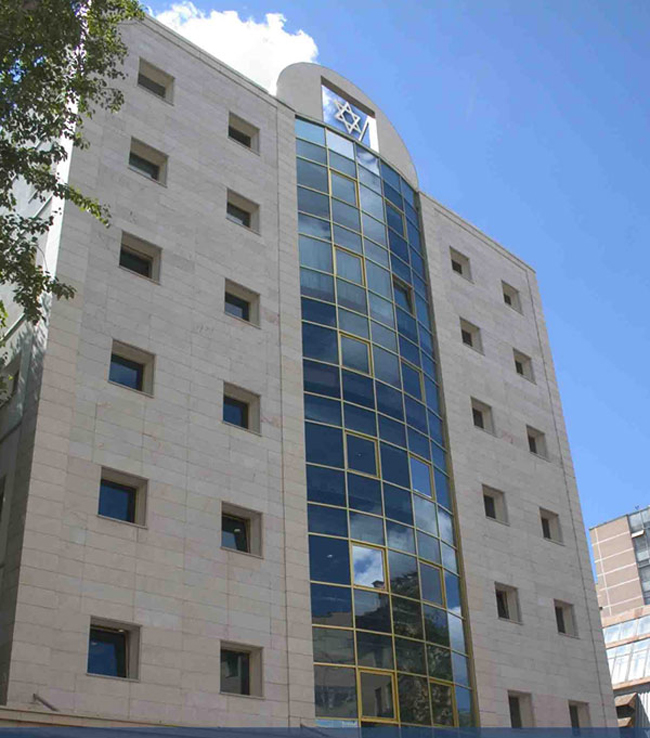
- Moscow Jewish Community Center
- Formation: 1999 (27 years ago)
- Founded at: Moscow, Russia
- Headquarters: 5A, 2nd Vysheslavtsev Lane, Moscow, Russia
- President: Aleksandr Boroda
- Chief Rabbi of Russia: Berel Lazar
- Subsidiaries: Jewish Museum and Tolerance Center
- Website: https://feor.ru/

The Federation of Jewish Communities of Russia (FJCR; Russian: Федерация Еврейских Общин России, ФЕОР) is a Russian religious organization that unifies communities of Orthodox Judaism, mostly of Chabad Hassidic movement. It was registered by the Russian Ministry of Justice in 1999. The Jewish Museum and Tolerance Center is under the federation's jurisdiction.

One of the two largest Jewish religious organizations in Russia (alongside the Congress of the Jewish Religious Organizations and Associations in Russia), the FJCR is the most influential Jewish organization in the country.

The FJCR is both a highly structured and very flexible organization. Local communities are directly incorporated into its structure. To facilitate cooperation between local communities and the creation of joint charitable, cultural, and educational projects, regional rabbinical councils with advisory functions operate.

The stated goal of the association is "to create conditions for a full-fledged religious and national-cultural life for citizens of Russia who practice Judaism and identify with the Jewish people. The primary means to achieve this goal is the comprehensive development of Jewish religious communities with the necessary infrastructure (synagogues, schools with a Jewish ethno-cultural component, yeshivas and other higher educational institutions, community centers, etc.) across the territory of the Russian Federation".

Although the FJCR is headed by a representative of Lubavitch Hasidism (Chabad), Berel Lazar, and Lubavitch Hasidic communities are primarily part of the FJCR, this association represents the interests of all streams of Orthodox Judaism in Russia. Some communities within the FJCR are merely led by Hasidim, while the congregants belong to traditional Judaism. The Federation includes both Bukharian and Litvak communities.

== History ==
The FJCR was established in 1997 based on the globally centralized structure of the Chabad-Lubavitch Hasidic movement. The significance of the CJROAR and the FJCR increased sharply following the adoption of the new version of the Freedom of Conscience and Religious Associations law in 1997, which required local religious communities to obtain confirmation from a centralized structure for registration. The founding congress of the FJCR took place on November 15, 1999. The congress brought together representatives from 80 federal subjects of Russia. Greetings to the forum were sent by Russian president Boris Yeltsin and Israeli president Ezer Weizman. The congress was also attended by Vladislav Surkov and Valentina Matviyenko, who at that time held the positions of Deputy Chief of the Presidential Administration and Vice Prime Minister, respectively. As early as November 25, 1999, a meeting took place at the White House between Russia's prime minister Vladimir Putin and the leadership of the newly created FJCR.

On June 13, 2000, 25 rabbis of the FJCR elected Berel Lazar as the group's leader and the Chief Rabbi of Russia, deepening a conflict with mainstream Orthodox and Reform Jewish groups in Russia that continued to recognize Adolf Shayevich as Chief Rabbi. Shayevich accused the Kremlin of meddling in internal Jewish affairs and favoring the FJCR over the Vladimir Gusinsky-funded Russian Jewish Congress as the umbrella group of Russia's Jews. Gusinsky was arrested earlier in the month and seen as a business rival to Kremlin insiders. Chief Rabbi of Moscow, Pinchas Goldschmidt, stated that his community would not recognize Lazar's election. Mikhail Chlenov, head of the Va'ad umbrella organization stated that Lazar's election meant that he was only elected Chief Chabad Rabbi in Russia.

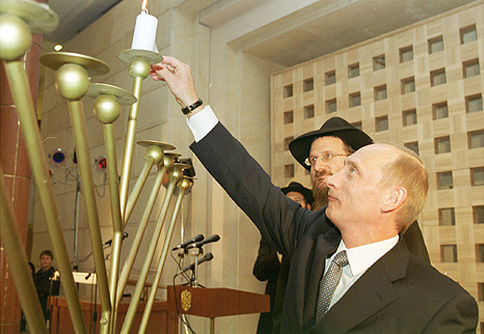
President Putin with Russia's Chief Rabbi Berel Lazar during the Jewish Hanukkah holiday at the Moscow Jewish Community Centre, December 2000

On September 18, 2000, the Moscow Jewish Community Center was opened. The community center immediately became a key facility of the FJCR in Moscow, and the FJCR's legal address matches that of the center. The opening ceremony of the community center was attended by Vladimir Putin, Moscow Vice Mayor Vladimir Resin, US Ambassador James Franklin Collins, Israeli Ambassador Natan Meron, Sephardic Chief Rabbi of Israel Mordechai Eliyahu, and cultural figures such as Joseph Kobzon, Philipp Kirkorov, Mikhail Shufutinsky, and others.

In 2002, the FJCR became a co-founder of the World Congress of Russian-Speaking Jewry, whose founding congress was attended by delegates from Jewish communities of the former Soviet republics, including the Baltic states, as well as leaders of Russian-speaking Jewish communities from Israel, the United States, Germany, Canada, Austria, and Australia.

In 2004, Aleksandr Boroda, who previously held the position of Executive Vice President, was elected Chairman of the FJCR Board.

In 2005, a regional editorial office began operating under the Federation of Jewish Communities of Russia, tasked with covering the life of Jewish communities remote from the capital.

In 2006, a special unit for interaction with the Russian Armed Forces, the Ministry of Emergency Situations, and law enforcement agencies was created within the structure of the FJCR. The unit's tasks included providing patronage for Jewish military personnel, protecting them from army arbitrariness, and providing material support to servicemen's families. This direction was headed by Rabbi Aharon Gurevich.

On February 19, 2008, the annual congress of the FJCR concluded at the Moscow Jewish Community Center. The congress was timed to coincide with the federation's 10th anniversary. It was attended by delegates from more than 180 Jewish communities across Russia. During the congress, Aleksandr Boroda was elected President of the FJCR.

== Administration ==
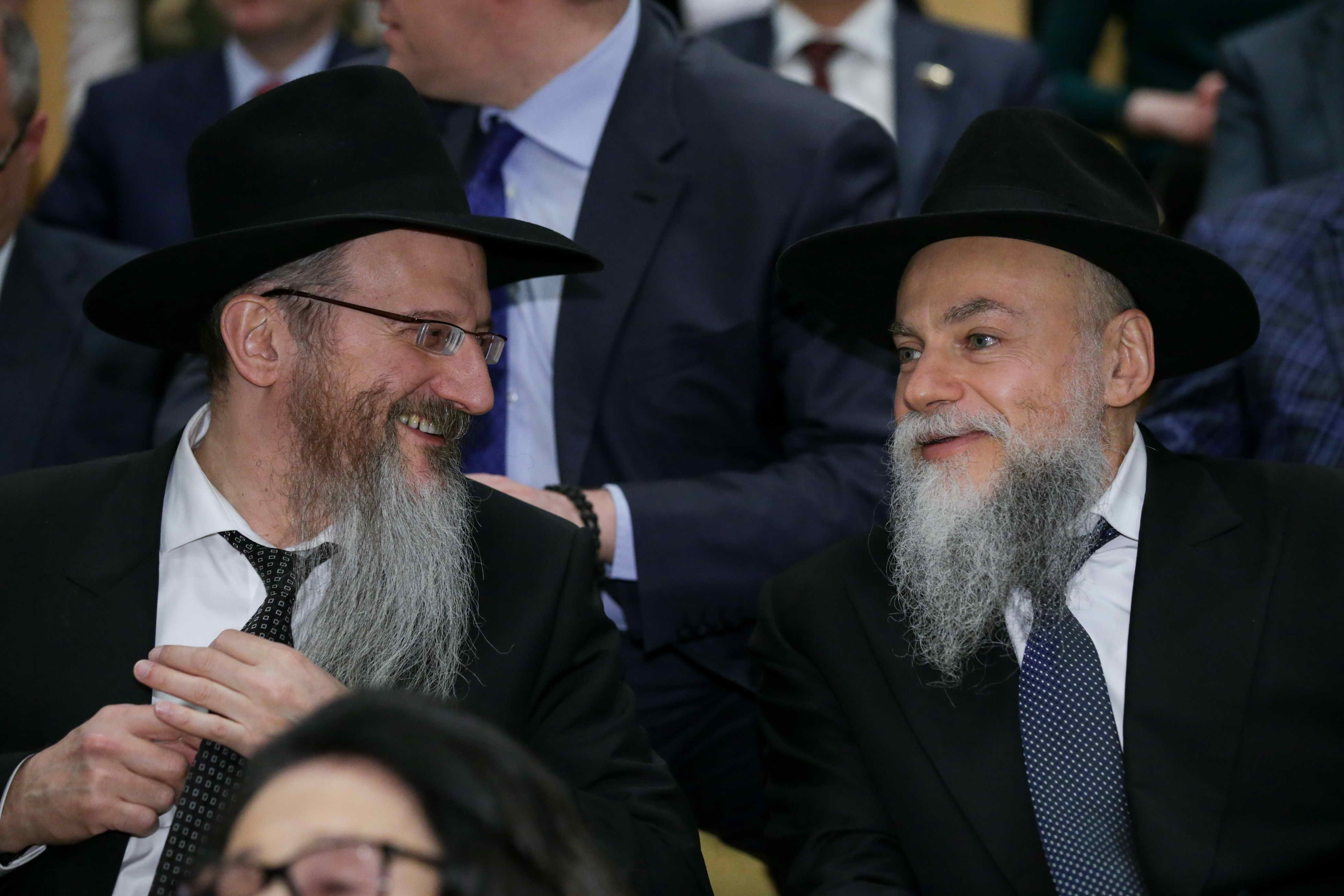
Berel Lazar and Aleksandr Boroda

Group leadership:

- Chairman of Council of Rabbis — Berel Lazar
- Chairman of Executive Board — Aleksandr Boroda
- Chairman of Board of Trustees — Roman Abramovich
- Chairman of Public Council — Boruch Gorin
- Head of Council Chairman — Mark Grubarg

== Activities ==
The FJCR says it represents the majority of religious Jewish groups in Russia.

The FJCR and the CJROAR are more in a state of competitive rivalry with each other. For this reason, two chief rabbis exist simultaneously in Russia. According to a number of experts, the FJCR received a much more significant resource base and influence compared to the CJROAR. The FJCR enjoys greater resource support from foreign communities and influential circles within Russia. This circumstance has, to some extent, contributed to the fact that a number of communities switched from the CJROAR to the FJCR. As of 2013, the head of the FJCR's Board of Trustees was the oligarch Roman Abramovich, and the chairman of the FJCR's Public Council was the singer and politician Joseph Kobzon.

Secular Jewish organizations may align themselves with the policies of either the CJROAR or the FJCR, while the positions of members within many of these associations often diverge, as the composition of most of these structures is quite diverse.

By 2005, the ratio between foreign aid and sponsorship donations from representatives of Russian Jewry had shifted significantly in favor of the latter. The coordination of the economic sphere is carried out by the foundation for supporting the activities of the Chabad-Lubavitch movement in the Commonwealth of Independent States and the Baltic countries ("Chabad-Lubavitch Or Avner"), which implements programs for the restoration of Jewish communities, support for various forms of general and Jewish religious education, distribution of humanitarian aid, and other initiatives.

Through an established system of donation collection and assistance from major entrepreneurs (such as Roman Abramovich and Lev Leviev), commercial organizations, and private individuals, as well as targeted fundraising for a number of programs, FEOR has almost entirely transitioned to domestic Russian funding.

The group maintains a department of legal defense against antisemitism.

As of 2007, the FJCR was active in 200 communities in 178 cities, with rabbis in 42 communities. It operates Sunday schools in 73 Russian cities, and 41 synagogues, among other facilities.

In 2002, FJCR established the Fiddler on the Roof Award.

== See also ==
- Antisemitism in Russia
- Israel-Russia relations
- Russian Jewish Congress
- Congress of the Jewish Religious Organizations and Associations in Russia
