= Shlomo Shleifer =

Russian-born American Orthodox rabbi and scholar (1889–1957)

Rabbi Shloime Mikhelevich Shleifer
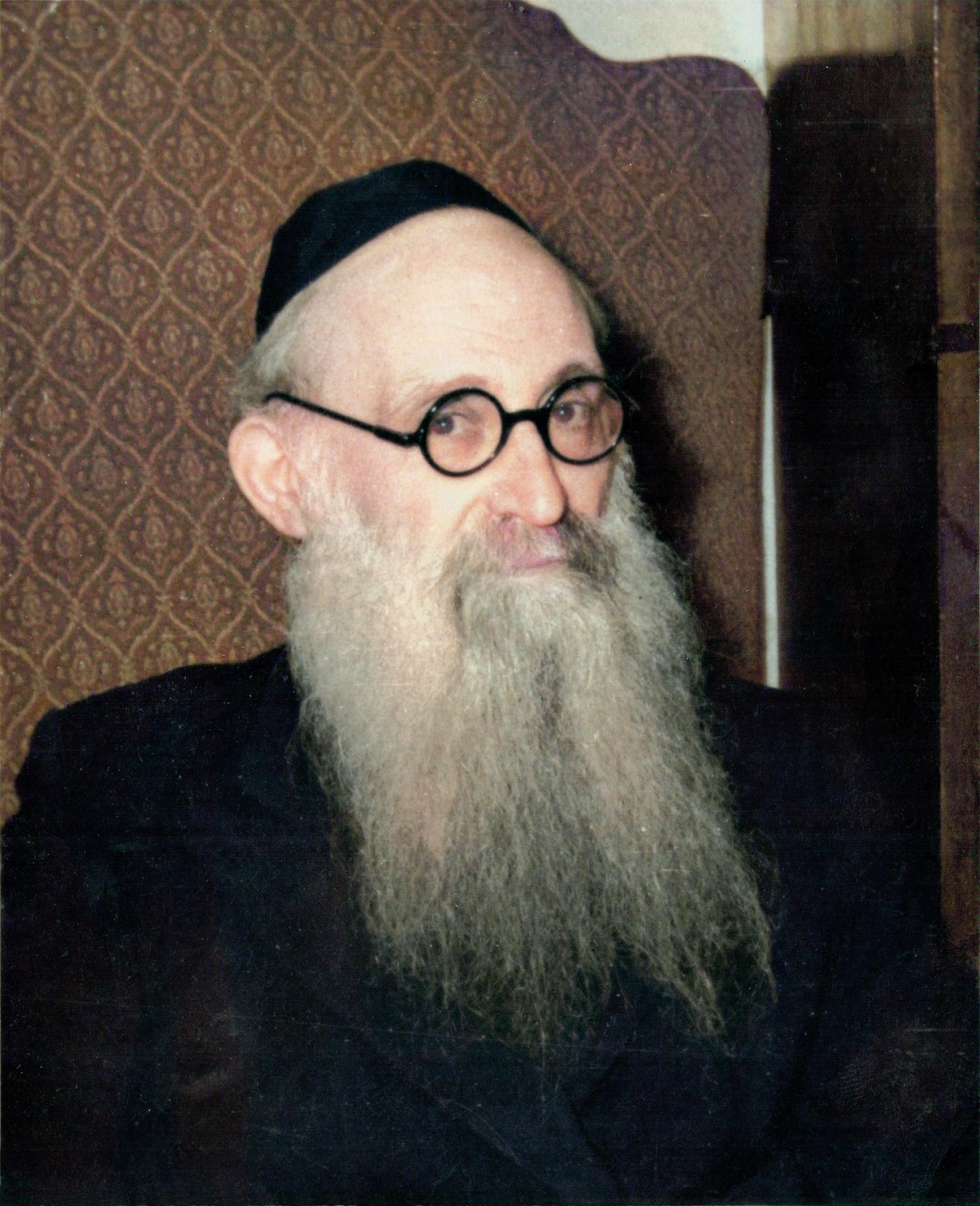

Rabbi of the Moscow Choral Synagogue
- In office 1943–1957

Personal life
- Born: December 23, 1889 Moscow, Russian Empire
- Died: March 27, 1957 (aged 67) Moscow, Soviet Union
- Occupation: Rabbi

Religious life
- Religion: Judaism
- Denomination: Modern Orthodox

Shloime Mikhelevich (Solomon Mikhailovich) Shleifer was born on December 23, 1889, in Moscow. His father was the rabbi of Alexandria, a town near Kherson. During the First World War, the Shleifer family moved to Moscow, where Rabbi Shleifer worked as a bookkeeper until 1943. He also served as the secretary of the Choral Synagogue. In 1941, he attempted to register for military service, but was turned down because of his age.

In 1943, Rabbi Shleifer was appointed to lead the Choral Synagogue, the largest synagogue in Moscow. Its previous rabbi, Shmarya Yehuda Leib Medalia had been arrested and executed for alleged disloyalty in 1938. The synagogue, suspected of serving as a meeting place for Zionists, was constantly under NKVD surveillance. A year before Shleifer’s appointment, Rabbi Shmuel Leib Levin was appointed rabbi. Due to his Chabad affiliation, he was viewed as too extreme, and was replaced with Shleifer.

== Soviet patriotism ==
During the Second World War, he lost one son in combat, and actively participated in meetings held by the Jewish Anti-Fascist Committee, which was set up to represent the Soviet Jewish voice in the war effort. In a 1944 meeting, he declared the war to be a "holy war" to "free the sons of Israel." For that year's Passover, he stood alongside the leading Soviet Jewish scientists, writers, and fighters to note the great effort Soviet Jews were making to ensure victory.

To demonstrate loyalty to the government, he composed a "prayer for peace on earth," and a prayer for the health of Joseph Stalin that were to distributed to synagogues around the country. In 1946, he removed the words "From Zion Shall come forth Torah" from above the synagogue ark, judging them to be too Zionist. He replaced these words with a verse from the Prophets about social justice. He also quoted Lenin and Stalin in his sermons.

== Relations with Israel ==
Towards the end of the war, a growing number of people came to the synagogue to pray for the survival of their relatives. On one occasion, 20,000 people came to pray at a synagogue that could only accommodate 1,600. Worshipers included leading Jewish figures, such as the wife of Vyacheslav Molotov.

On September 2, 1948, Israeli’s newly appointed ambassador to the USSR, Russian-born Golda Meir visited the synagogue for Sabbath and the following Rosh Hashanah. The sizable crowds (estimated at 100,000) that greeted Meir and the concluding prayer of “Next Year in Jerusalem” stoked suspicions of Zionism against the rabbi. On November 20, 1948, the Jewish Anti-Fascist Committee was disbanded, its leading members arrested and charged with Zionist activities. Rabbi Shleifer escaped suspicion by writing a personal appeal to Stalin.

== Reputation ==
He died the 27/3/1957 while teaching a Torah class. He is best known for sustaining a synagogue in Moscow during the worst years of Stalinist repression against Jews. As a government appointee, he demonstrated loyalty to Stalin, and denied that there was anti-semitism in the USSR. He maintained ties with foreign Jewish figures as part of the wartime campaign to promote the participation of Soviet Jews in the war effort.
