= Shmuel Leib Levin =

Russian rabbi

Rabbi Shmuel Leib Levin

Chief Rabbi of Moscow
- In office 1943
- Preceded by: Shmarya Yehuda Leib Medalia
- Succeeded by: Shlomo Shleifer

Personal life
- Born: 1890 Parychy, Russian Empire
- Died: 26 October 1951 (aged 60–61)
- Dynasty: Chabad
- Other name: Shmuel Leib Paritcher

Religious life
- Religion: Judaism
- Dynasty: Chabad

Shmuel-Leib Yankelevich Levin (1890–26 October 1951) was a Russian Hasidic rabbi who served as the chief rabbi of Moscow for a brief period in 1943. He was known among Chabad hasidim as Shmuel Leib Paritcher, based on his birth place of Paritch.

== Biography ==
Levin was born in Paritch, Russian Empire in 1890, and studied at Yeshiva of Tomchei Temimim in Lyubavichi. After marrying the daughter of Rabbi Meir Simcha Chein of Nevel, he served as a maggid shiur in Tomchei Temimim's branch in Horodyshche, and later as a mashpia in its Poltava branch. In 1943, he was appointed as the chief rabbi of Moscow. Shortly after his appointment, the Moscow Jewish community's official board decided to remove him from his position, feeling he was too extreme. He was replaced by Shlomo Shleifer.
