= Aleksandr Boroda =

Russian rabbi

- Александр Борода
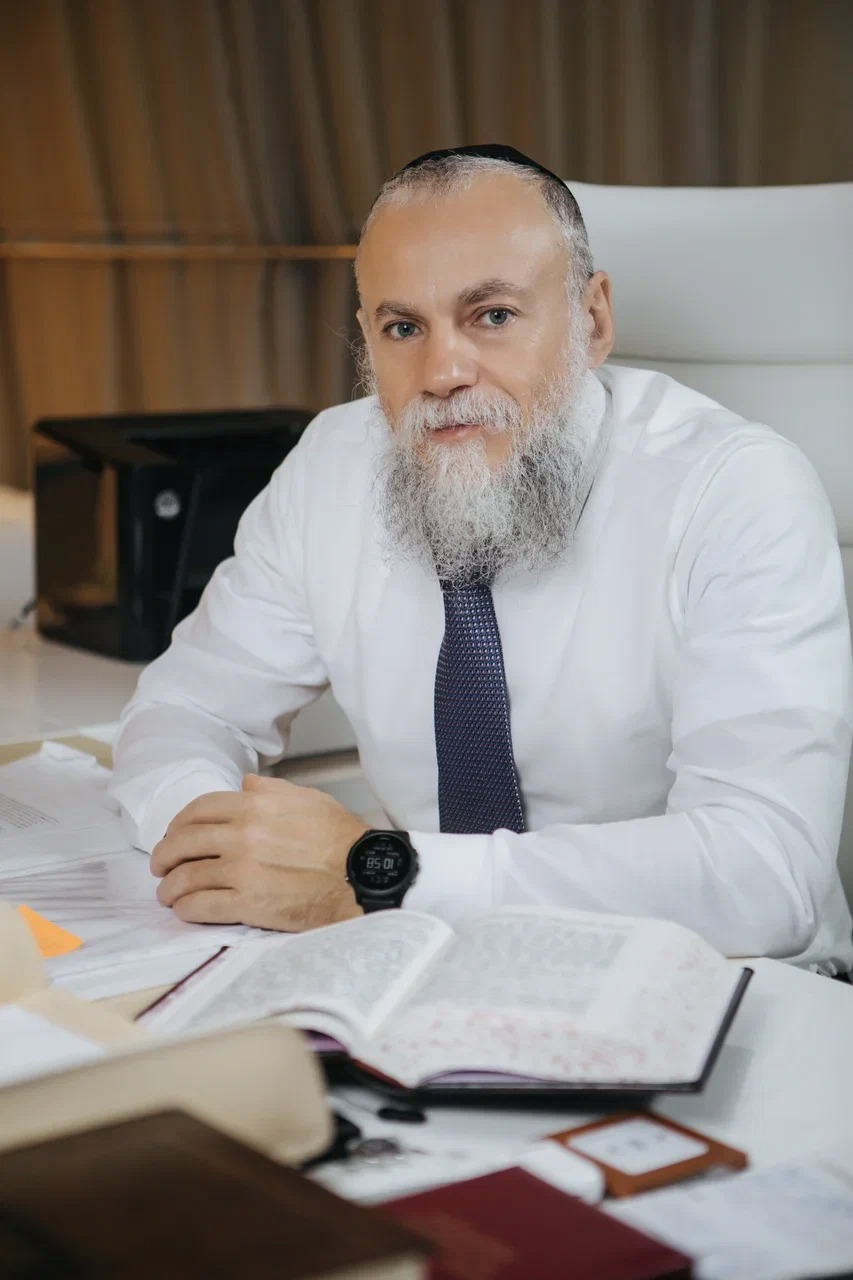
- Boroda in 2020

President of the Federation of Jewish Communities of Russia
- Incumbent
- Assumed office 19 February 2008

Member of the Civic Chamber of Russia
- Incumbent
- Assumed office September 2009

Personal details
- Born: 2 July 1968 (age 58) Moscow, Soviet Union
- Citizenship: Russia
- Spouse: Inna Boroda
- Children: 8
- Education: All-Union Correspondence Polytechnic Institute
- Occupation: Rabbi, museum director
- Awards: Order of Friendship; Medal of the Order "For Merit to the Fatherland", 2nd class

Aleksandr Moiseevich Boroda (Russian: Александр Моисеевич Борода; born 2 July 1968) is a Russian Jewish rabbi and social activist. He has been president of the Federation of Jewish Communities of Russia since February 2008 and director of the Jewish Museum and Tolerance Center since November 2012.

== Biography ==
Aleksandr Boroda was born on July 2, 1968 in Moscow to a family of engineers. He spent his childhood in the Maryina Roshcha District. He graduated from the Moscow College of Transport Construction.

In 1986-1987 he was a second-category worker of the geodetic and mine surveying department of "Glavtonnelmetrostroy" (Soviet state-owned railway tunnel and subway construction company).

In 1987 he was conscripted into the Soviet Armed Forces, served from 1987 to 1989 in naval aviation.

After the army, he returned to his previous place of work, was a shift surveyor, took part in the construction of the Konkovo, Tyoply Stan, Bibirevo, and Altufyevo metro stations. At the same time, he graduated from the All-Union Correspondence Polytechnic Institute (now part of the Moscow Polytechnic University) with a degree in mine surveying.

In 1989, while studying at the institute and working, Boroda began to attend synagogue. From 1993 to 1998, he worked for the Lechaim magazine together with Boruch Gorin, who became the magazine's editor-in-chief and headed the Federation of Jewish Communities of Russia Public Relations Department.

Continuing to work for the magazine, from 1996 to 2000, Boroda was the president of the regional Public Foundation for the Development of Jewish Culture, dealing with the problems of developing Jewish life on a Moscow scale. The foundation was one of the first in Russia to launch broad charitable activities: first of all, extensive monthly regional programs for low-income families, cultural and educational work, educational programs and seminars, and monthly charity concerts.

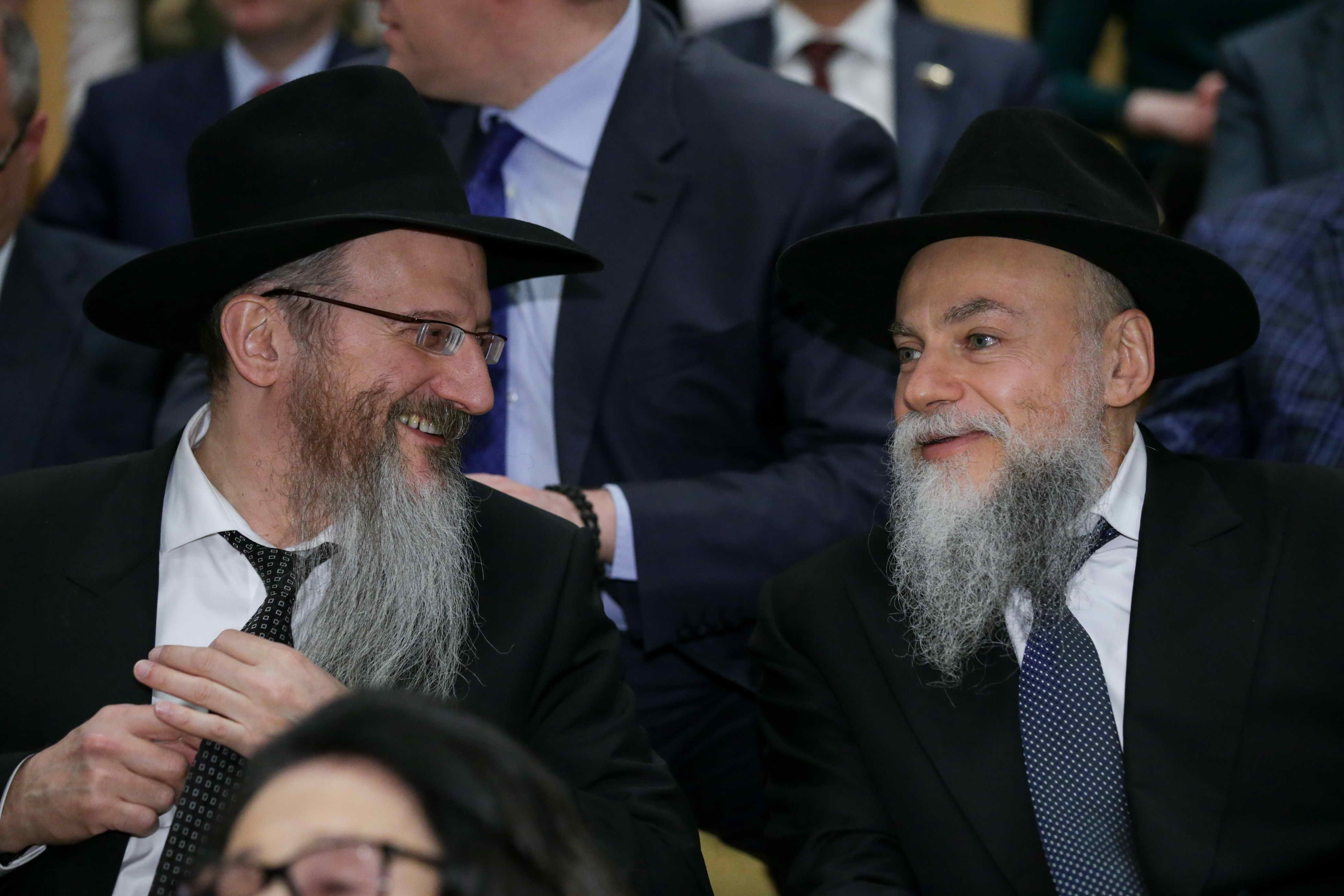
Boroda and Russia's chief rabbi Berel Lazar, 2018

In 2000, Aleksandr Boroda became the executive vice-president of the Federation of Jewish Communities of Russia, and in 2004 he became a member of the FJCR board. From 2000 to 2007, Boroda worked as the director of the "Ezra" regional public foundation.

In February 2008, Aleksandr Boroda was elected president of the Federation of Jewish Communities of Russia, and in January 2020 he was re-elected to this position once again.

=== Activity ===
In 1996, with Boroda's assistance, the construction of the Moscow Jewish Community Center, the largest in Eastern Europe, began, which was completed in 2000. The opening ceremony of the center was attended by Russian president Vladimir Putin.

Under the leadership of Aleksandr Boroda, the federation became the largest religious organization of Orthodox Judaism in Russia.

Since 2009, Aleksandr Boroda has been a member of the Civic Chamber of the Russian Federation. In September 2009, by Dmitry Medvedev's presidential decree, he was approved as a member of the Civic Chamber for the first time. The last time he was included in the Civic Chamber was by Vladimir Putin's presidential decree on April 6, 2023.

Boroda is a member of the expert group on improving legislation in the field of freedom of conscience and religious associations and a member of the expert council of the State Duma Committee on the Development of Civil Society, Issues of Public and Religious Associations.

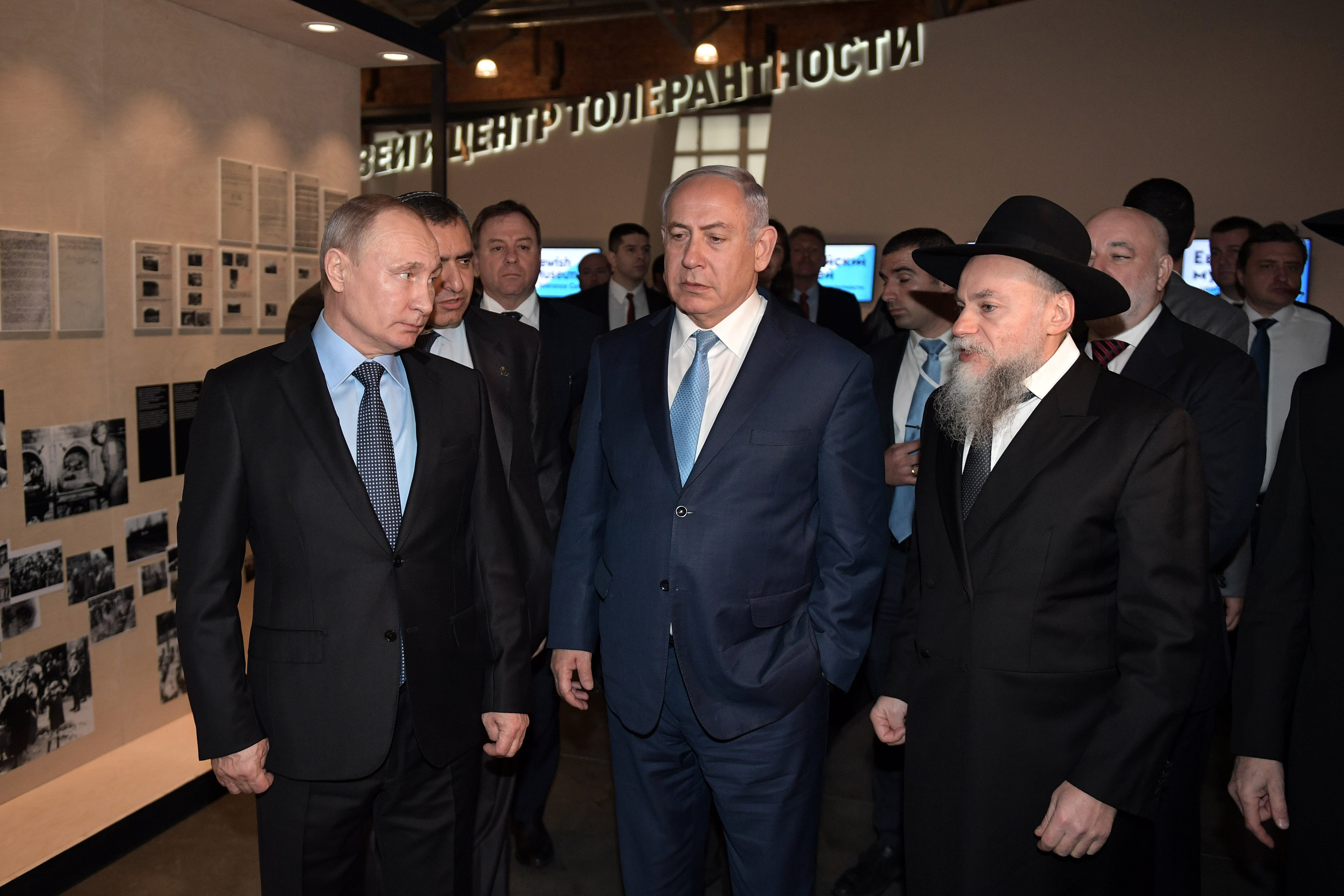
Boroda with Russian president Vladimir Putin and Israeli prime minister Benjamin Netanyahu at the Jewish Museum and Tolerance Center, January 2018

In 2012, on the initiative of the FJCR president Aleksandr Boroda and Russia's chief rabbi Berel Lazar, the Jewish Museum and Tolerance Center was opened in the Bakhmetevsky Bus Garage building in Moscow, with Aleksandr Boroda as its founder and director.

In December 2015, the Zhukovka Jewish Cultural and Religious Center was opened in the village of Zhukovka, Odintsovsky District, Moscow Oblast, under his leadership. Since its founding, Aleksandr Boroda has become the chief rabbi of the Jewish Cultural and Religious Center.

In 2015, he became a member of the Jury of the 1st Moscow Jewish Film Festival, and in 2016, the 2nd Moscow Jewish Film Festival. Since 2017, he has been a member of the Public Council of the Moscow Jewish Film Festival.

In November 2016, Aleksandr Boroda was invited to Paris, where at UNESCO headquarters the Jewish Museum and Tolerance Center received the Madanjeet Singh Prize for disseminating the ideals of peace and non-violence.

In 2018, the Zhukovka Jewish Religious and Cultural Center was awarded the international architectural prize The International Property Awards. The Jewish Cultural and Religious Center won in three nominations at once: "Design of Public Buildings", "Architecture of Public Projects", and "Construction of Public Projects".

=== Social positions ===
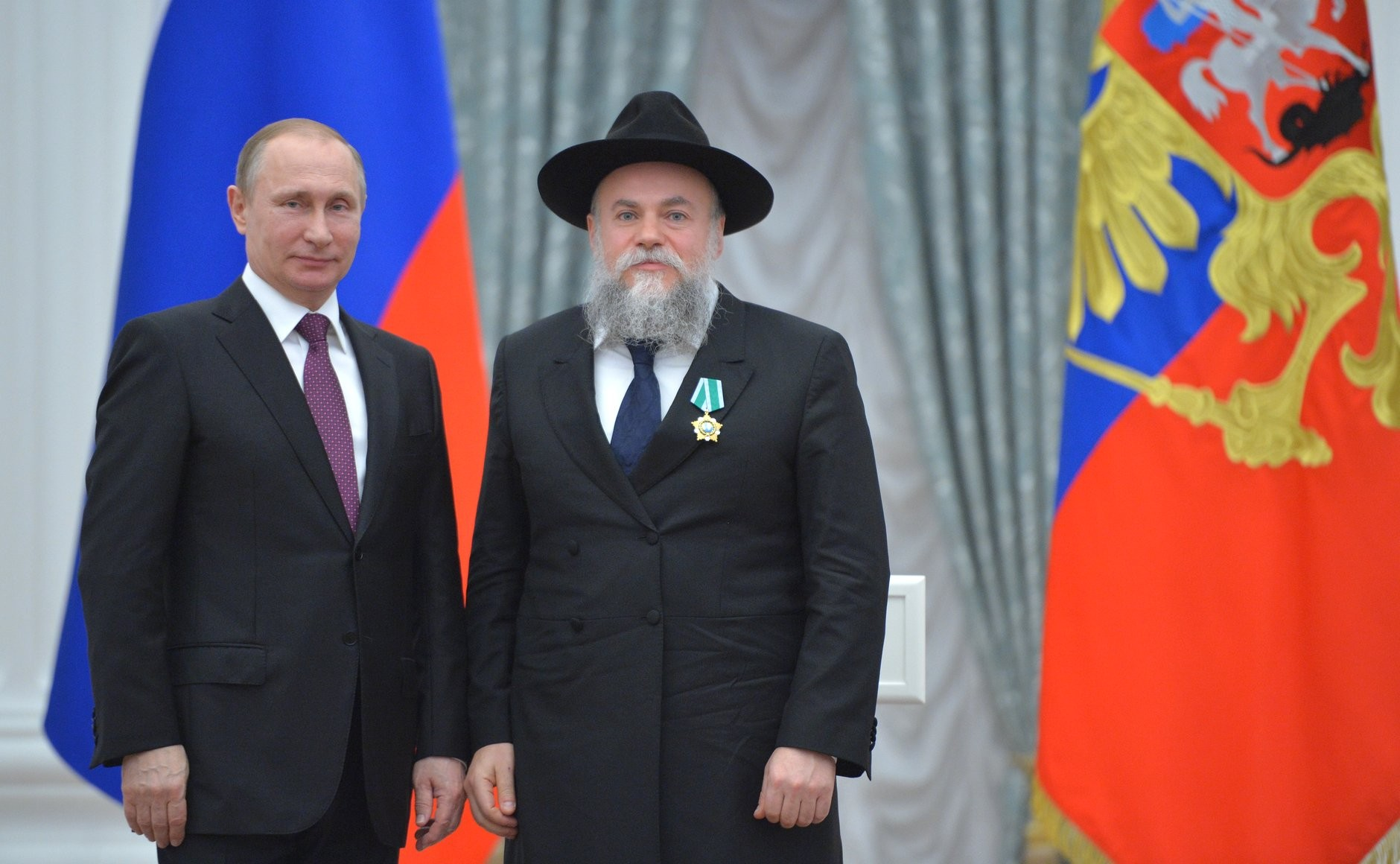
Boroda, awarded with the Order of Friendship, and Vladimir Putin, March 2016

In January 2015, Rabbi Boroda condemned the vandals who desecrated the Memorial Mosque on Poklonnaya Hill, and called for friendly relations between representatives of various peoples and religions.

In January 2017, Boroda condemned anti-Semitic the words of the State Duma Vice Speaker, Pyotr Tolstoy, who, commenting on the protests against the transfer of Saint Isaac's Cathedral to the Russian Orthodox Church, stated that the protests were being carried out by "the descendants of those who destroyed Orthodox churches" who "jumped out from behind the Pale of Settlement". He called on the leadership of the State Duma and the United Russia party to give them a proper assessment. Commenting on Tolstoy's statements, Boroda noted that his words "are an old and false, like all similar stories, anti-Semitic myth, and its falsity is obvious to any more or less educated person." Boroda emphasized that the bulk of those who destroyed churches were locals, "the same workers and peasants, and not the mythical "those who jumped out from behind the Pale of Settlement with revolvers".

In January 2020, he condemned the glorification of Nazi criminals in Ukraine, Poland and the Baltic states, stating "what is happening in modern Ukraine, Poland, the Baltic countries regarding the glorification of criminals, the hushing up of the truth is unacceptable and criminal".

In September 2020, during the protests in Belarus, Boroda called on Belarusian president Alexander Lukashenko not to lose touch with the people, to be more open to all sectors of society, and also wished Lukashenko not to walk around with a machine gun, but to communicate more with the Belarusian people.

In May 2021, he criticized and condemned the statements of the State Duma deputies Vladimir Zhirinovsky and Vyacheslav Lysakov, stating "the words of Zhirinovsky and Lysakov are not just xenophobic attacks, but tools with which some politicians broadcast an invented image of a hostile and negative reality in Russian society". Earlier in his speech, Zhirinovsky accused Jews of inciting anti-Semitism, and Lysakov spoke unflatteringly about the singer Manizha, emphasizing her ethnicity.

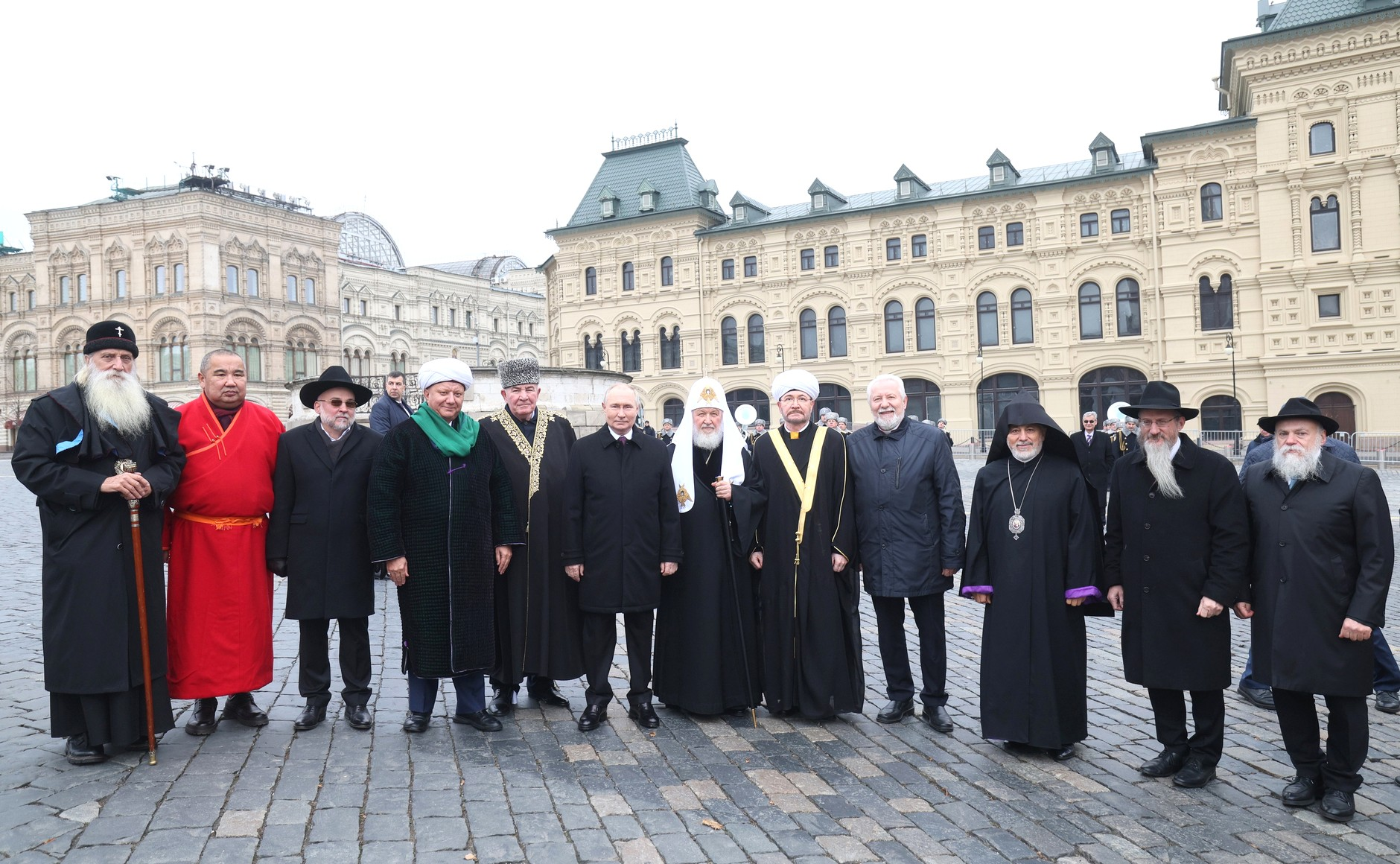
Boroda, among other Russia's religious leaders, including Patriarch Kirill of Moscow, with Vladimir Putin, November 2023

In March 2022, against the backdrop of Russia's invasion of Ukraine, Boroda spoke of a "surge in neo-Nazism in Ukraine", noting that in Ukraine "there is a glorification of criminals guilty of the death of the ancestors of those very Jews". Later, in an interview with Israeli media, he denied ever speaking out in support of the war against Ukraine and claimed that he had only called for peace. Nevertheless, Boroda criticized the chief rabbi of Moscow, Pinchas Goldschmidt, who left the country due to the war. He alleged, among other things, that Goldschmidt "views Jews in Russia as second-class people" and is "slandering" the community. In July 2022, as a "supporter of Russia's aggression against Ukraine", he was added to the Anti-Corruption Foundation list of bribe-takers and warmongers (in the category of "Corrupt opinion leaders and public supporters of Putin") consisting of individuals who "use their religious organizations to promote aggression and mass murder", with a proposal to impose international sanctions against him. The Ukrainian National Agency on Corruption Prevention has proposed imposing international sanctions against Boroda, noting that he "supports the Ukrainophobic tendency in covering up certain incidents, in particular, the missile strike near the Babyn Yar memorial complex".

On May 4, 2022, Aleksandr Boroda condemned the statement of Russian Foreign Minister Sergey Lavrov, stating "In connection with the current information situation around Mr Lavrov's passage about Hitler's possible Jewish roots, we consider it necessary to call for an end to appealing to the national origin of opponents". Earlier, in response to a journalist's question about how Ukraine can be accused of "Nazification" if its president Volodymyr Zelenskyy is Jewish, Sergey Lavrov said that Adolf Hitler also had "Jewish blood", and that "the most ardent anti-Semites" are usually Jews.
