= Adolf Shayevich =

Soviet-Russian Orthodox rabbi

Rabbi Adolf Solomonovich Shayevich
- Адольф Соломонович Шаевич

Chief Rabbi of Moscow
- Incumbent
- Assumed office 1983

Chief Rabbi of Russia
- Preceded by: Yakov Leybovich Fishman

Personal details
- Born: 28 October 1937 (age 88) Birobidzhan, Soviet Union
- Parent: Solomonovich Shayevich
- Occupation: Chief Rabbi of Russia
- Awards: Order "For Merit to the Fatherland"; Order of Honour; Order of Holy Prince Daniel of Moscow; Order of Friendship of Peoples
- Website: https://web.archive.org/web/20110716001236/http://religion.ng.ru/people/2007-01-17/5_shaevich.html

Adolf Solomonovich Shayevich (Note: Given name also transcribed as Adolph, and surname as Shayevitch or Shaevich.) (Russian: Адольф Соломонович Шаевич; born 28 October 1937) is a Soviet and Russian Orthodox rabbi who has been the rabbi of the Moscow Choral Synagogue since 1983, which is traditionally regarded as Moscow's main Jewish house of prayer.

During the waning days of the Soviet Union, Shayevich was sometimes unofficially referred to in the West as the "Soviet Union's Chief Rabbi". Shayevich presently holds the position of the Chief Rabbi of Russia representing the Russian Jewish Congress, one of the two major Jewish organization in Russia (of which he also is a member of the presidium). His claim to this title is not universally recognized, however, as the country's other major Jewish organization, Federation of Jewish Communities of Russia, which has been supported by Russia's political leadership since 2000, has its own Chief Rabbi of Russia, Berel Lazar, an adherent of Chabad. While the Russian Federation is a secular state, the federal government has referred to both Lazar and Shayevich as the "Chief Rabbi of Russia".

== Early life and education ==
Adolf Shayevich was raised in Birobidzhan during the years under Joseph Stalin in far-eastern Siberia near the border with China, in a fairly secular family of Belarusian Jewish descent.

In the early 1970s, Shayevich left his job as a chief mechanic with a local government agency and moved to Moscow. According to his own recollection, he was looking for a change of environment, a more meaningful life where people are not tempted to spend their free time drinking. He found it difficult to find a job in Moscow: employers were wary about hiring a Jew, as they would not want to have any problems on their hands if the employee were to decide to migrate to Israel. However, in 1972 he was admitted to the small religious school affiliated with the Moscow Choral Synagogue, the main synagogue of the city.

In 1973, the visiting New York rabbi Arthur Schneier, who had long had good relations both with the chief rabbi of the Moscow Synagogue, Yakov Fishman and with the Soviet ambassador to the U.S. Anatoly Dobrynin, helped two Soviet rabbinical students — Shayevich and Yefim Levitis (who was later to become the rabbi of the Leningrad Synagogue) – to enter the Rabbinical Seminary in Budapest, the only rabbinical training institution that operated at the time in the Soviet Bloc. Shayevich and Levitis became the first two Soviet rabbinical students in their generation who were allowed to go to study abroad. Shayevich was ordained as a rabbi in April 1980. He met his wife in Budapest.

== Career ==
Back in Moscow, after returning from Budapest, the Council for Religious Affairs (the Soviet government's office for dealing with the religious institutions) suggested that the newly ordained Shayevich return to Birobidzhan - where there was not even a synagogue at the time – but Rabbi Fishman offered Shayevich a position as his deputy at Moscow Choral Synagogue, located in downtown Moscow's Arkhipov Street. In the summer of 1983, after the death of Fishman, Shayevich took over his post as the chief rabbi of the synagogue a post he holds to this day. As this was Moscow's largest and principal synagogue, and the only synagogue in central Moscow, this appointment also made him the Chief Rabbi of Moscow.

In 1984, Shayevich visited the United States in a delegation of Soviet religious leaders, hosted by the U.S. National Council of Churches. In 1988, he spent 3 months studying at Yeshiva University in New York.

In a letter dated 1 January 1989, Rabbi Shayevich informed the World Jewish Congress that he was no longer a member of the Anti-Zionist Committee of the Soviet Public; that made possible his participation in the WJC. Shayevich was appointed the Chief Rabbi of Russia by the Russian Jewish Congress although Rabbi Berel Lazar is the officially recognized Chief Rabbi of Russia by the Russian government. In June 2000, the dispute between Lazar and Shayevich escalated after Chabad requested that Shayevitch resign his claim to the post. When Lazar was named by the Kremlin to a high-profile governmental advisory panel that includes leaders of all religions officially recognized by the Russian government, the Kremlin demonstrated that it officially recognized Lazar as the religious leader of the Russian Jewish community, replacing congress's Shayevich, who until then had occupied the post.

The Russian Government has not invited Shayevich to any state events or giving him any posts. Lazar, on the other hand, as the Kremlin-recognized Chief Rabbi of Russia, has received a number of important official positions and has been showered with medals by the Russian government. Shayevich's closeness to Vladimir Gusinsky, the head of the Russian Jewish Congress, is thought to be the cause of his isolation. After Gusinsky supported Putin's rivals for president in 1999, Putin immediately brought Lazar into his circle on becoming president.

In a June 2015 interview with Russian journalist Ksenia Sobchak, Shayevich expressed his support for the hanging of homosexuals in Iran.

== Awards ==
- In 1987, Shayevich was awarded the Soviet Order of Friendship of Peoples. In 2008, on the occasion of the rabbi's 70th anniversary, he was awarded the highest award of the City Government of Moscow, the "Medal of Merit for Moscow", by Mayor Yuri Luzhkov.
- Order "For Merit to the Fatherland"
- Order of Honour
- Order of Holy Prince Daniel of Moscow
- Order of Friendship of Peoples
