= Order of Holy Prince Daniel of Moscow =

Award of the Russian Orthodox Church

Order of Holy Prince Daniel of Moscow Орден Святого благоверного князя Даниила Московского
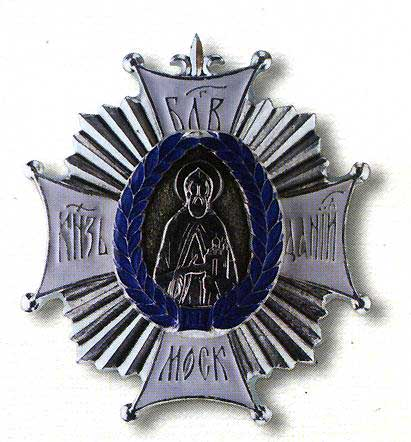
- Presented by: Russian Orthodox Church
- Status: Active
- Established: 28 December 1988

Precedence
- Next (higher): Order of Reverend Sergius of Radonezh
- Next (lower): Order of the Holy Princess Olga

The Order of Holy Prince Daniel of Moscow (Russian: Орден святого благоверного князя Даниила Московского) is an award of the Russian Orthodox Church, established in 1988. There are three classes.

== History ==
The Order was created by the Patriarch of Moscow and All Russia, Pimen I, and the Holy Synod of 28 December 1988 to mark the 1000th anniversary of the Baptism of Russia.

== Eligibility ==
The award may be conferred upon clergy, lay people and, in exceptional cases, organisations. It is awarded for services in the revival of spiritual life in Russia.

== Description ==
The Order has three grades.

1st class

The badge is a nickel-silver Byzantine cross (with truncated beams to the centre and slightly concave external parties). In the centre of the cross, there is a white enamel gilt embossed half-length image of St. Daniel in an oval with an image framed by two palm branches with dark blue enamel. On the broad ribbon connecting the laurel branches, specify the extent of the Order. On the branches of the cross are gilded letters Church Slavonic letters at the top: - "faithful" to the left - "KNZ" on the right - "DANIIL" at the bottom - "ISKCON" ("Pious Prince Daniel of Moscow") along the diagonals of the cross, adjacent to oval with a picture, are four crowns, each of which is decorated with rhinestones and ends with four-armed cross. At the top of the sign of the heraldic trefoil.

The statute of the Order was amended by the Patriarch and Holy Synod on 14 April 2006:

With this award the Order of the I level, the Heads of Churches and the Heads of State, awarded Merit, the Order of, a silk moire ribbon and orange suspension order on the tape.

2nd class

The badge is similar to that of the 1st class, but it is made of silvered nickel silver. Instead, the crowns are rays emanating from the centre. The central image of St. Daniel's background and bay frame, with a ribbon bearing the symbol of degree II, gilded.

3rd class

The badge is similar to the 2nd class, but is made with the technique of blackening. The central image of St. Daniel's laurel branches frame the blue enamel, with a ribbon bearing the sign of the degree III.

== Rules of wearing ==
Worn on the left breast. Only the most senior class of the Order is to be worn.

== Notable recipients ==
Anatoly Karpov - multiple world chess champion
Ilham Aliyev - President of Azerbaijan
Daniil Granin - writer (2009)
Leonid Gorbenko - Governor of the Kaliningrad oblast
Daniel (Nushiro) of Japan - Primate of the Autonomous Orthodox Church of Japan (2003)
Nikolai Karpov - the first popularly elected mayor of Sochi (1996-2000), honorary citizen of the city of Sochi (2006)
Mikhail Prokhorov - Russian businessman (2004)
Viktor Yanukovych - President of Ukraine
Igor Smirnov - President of the Pridnestrovian Moldavian Republic
Valery Gergiev - conductor of the Mariinsky Theatre
Nursultan Nazarbayev - President of the Republic of Kazakhstan
Mintimer Shaimiev - President of Tatarstan
Adolf Shayevich, Russian-Jewish rabbi

== See also ==
- List of ecclesiastical decorations
