= David Dragunsky =

Soviet officer and politician

David Abramovich Dragunsky
- Давид Абрамович Драгунский
- Dragunsky, c. 1940s
- Born: 15 February [O.S. 2 February] 1910; Svyatsk, Chernigov Governorate, Russian Empire
- Died: 12 October 1992 (aged 82); Moscow, Russian Federation
- Military career
- Allegiance: Soviet Union
- Service years: 1931 – 1974
- Rank: Colonel General
- Conflicts: World War II
- Awards: Hero of the Soviet Union (twice)

David Abramovich Dragunsky (Russian: Дави́д Абра́мович Драгу́нский; 15 February [O.S. 2 February] 1910 – 12 October 1992) was a tank officer in World War II who was twice awarded the title Hero of the Soviet Union.

== Early life ==
Dragunsky was born on 15 February [O.S. 2 February] 1910 to a large Jewish family in Svyatsk; his parents were tailors. After completing school in Novozybkov he became a construction worker. As a member of the Komsomol he was made head of a district council and later sent to rural areas to participate in collectivization. He became a member of the Communist Party in 1931 and was drafted into the military in 1933.

== Military career ==
In 1938, he commanded an infantry company during combat operations near Khasan Lake and was awarded an Order of the Red Banner. During World War II, he was in command of a Tank battalion and, in 1943, he became the commander of the 55th Guards Tank Brigade of the 3rd Guards Tank Army. Between 1960 and 1965, he commanded the 7th Guards Army.

== Politics ==
He became an ordinary member of the Communist Party of the Soviet Union in 1931, a member of the Regimental Party Committee in 1935, and Secretary of the Brigade Committee in 1942. He became a Candidate Member of the Central Committee of the CPSU in 1974 and a full member in 1979. In 1983, he was designated chairman of the newly-formed Anti-Zionist Committee of the Soviet Public by the Ideological Department of the CPSU Central Committee and the KGB.
