= Turetsky Choir Art Group =

Russian men's a cappella ensemble established in 1989

The Turetsky Men's Chorus
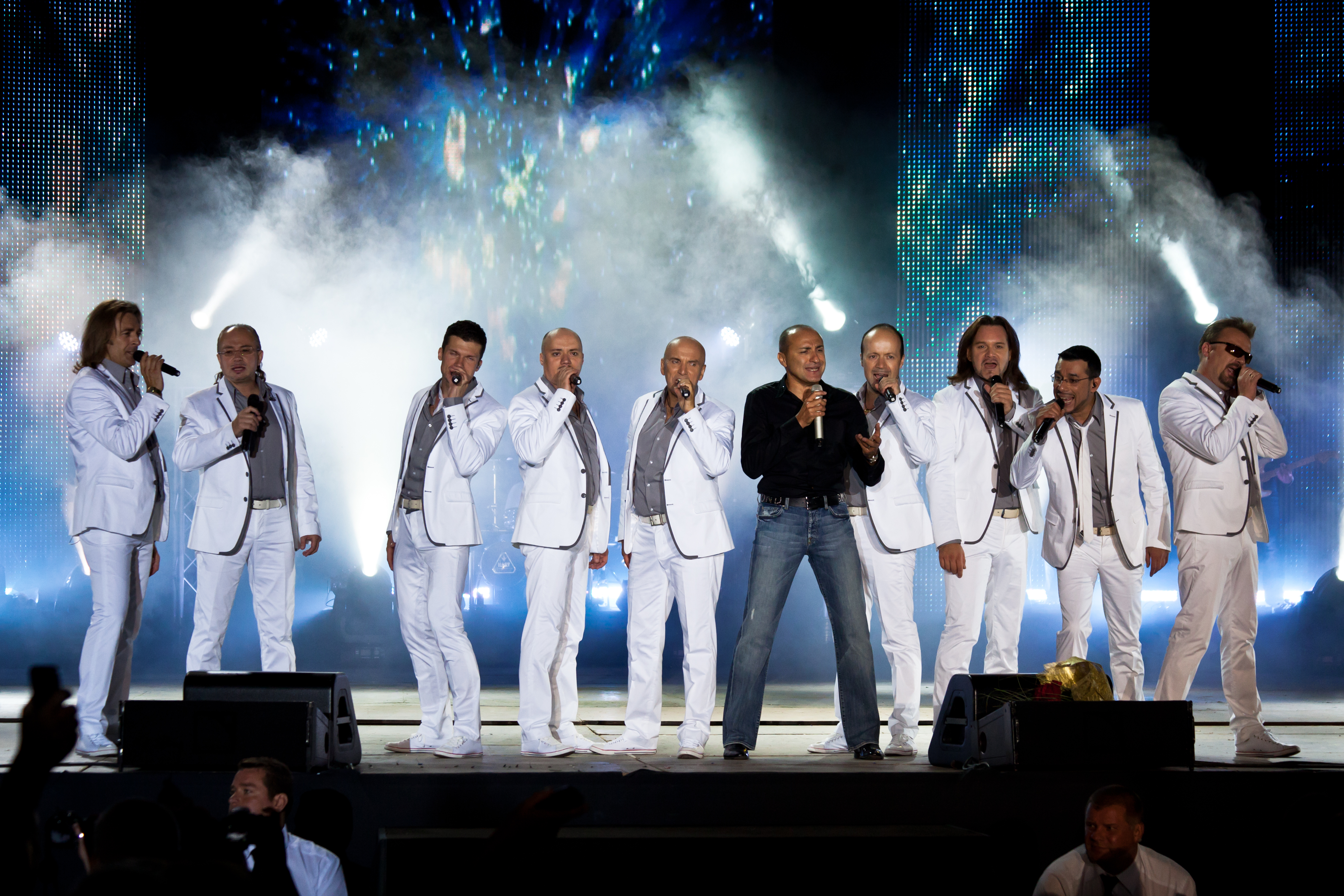
- From left to right: Oleg Blyahorchuk, Evgeny Tulinov, Vyacheslav Fresh, Konstantin Kabo, Mikhail Kuznetsov, Mikhail Turetsky, Alex Alexandrov, Boris Goryachev, Evgeny Kulmis and Igor Zverev performing at the Green Theater (Moscow), 2011.

Background information
- Origin: Moscow, Russia
- Genres: Vocal; crossover; a cappella
- Years active: 1989–present
- Labels: Nikitin
- Members: Mikhail Turetsky; Evgeny Tulinov; Mikhail Kuznetsov; Alex Alexandrov; Evgeny Kulmis; Oleg Blyahorchuk; Igor Zverev; Konstantin Kabo; Vyacheslav Fresh; Pavel Berkut; Avi Grigoryan; Edward Khacharyan; Alibek Almadiyev
- Past members: Arthur Keish; Valentin Suhodolets; Boris Goryachev
- Website: http://www.arthor.ru/

The Turetsky Choir (Russian: Хор Турецкого) is a Russian men's a cappella ensemble and musical collective under the direction of Mikhail Turetsky. Their voices range from tenore contraltino to basso profundo.

== History ==
The Turetsky Men's Choir was established in 1989. With financial support from the American Jewish Joint Distribution Committee, the choir made its debut in 1990 at the Moscow Choral Synagogue with Jewish liturgical and folk music in the philharmonic halls of Tallinn, Kaliningrad, Moscow and other cities.

=== Performances ===
From 1991–1992, they performed in Washington, D.C., for Congress at the Chanukah celebration, the Park East Synagogue in New York, and at Carnegie and Merkin Halls. They were invited to sing in Spain at the Por Me Espiritu international festival, commemorating the 500th year since the Spanish expulsion of the Jews. They also toured England, Israel and Poland. In 1993, the American Cantor Association awarded Mikhail Turetsky the Golden Crown of the Cantors of the World Award.

In 1995, the choir split into two segments. One group stayed in Moscow; the other went to Miami to work at Temple Emmanu-El Synagogue. The choir performed together alongside Julio Iglesias. In 1997, the group took part in over 100 concerts in Iosif Kobzon's Russian farewell tour. The next year, the choir toured the Commonwealth of Independent States (CIS). In 2000–2001, they joint toured with Iosif Kobzon on the Moscow State Variety Theatre.

In 2002, Mikhail Turetsky received the title "Honored Artist of the Russian Federation" for his achievements in the arts. Their first performance under the name Turetsky Choir Art Group took place in January 2004. Later, the choir presented the program "When Men Are Singing" in the State Kremlin Palace with the participation of Emma Shapplin and Gloria Gaynor. In January 2005, they performed in American concert halls in San Francisco, Los Angeles, Atlantic City, Boston and Chicago. Their 2005–2006 anniversary tour "Born to Sing" visited cities in Russia and the CIS.

In 2007, the choir received the Russian Music Award "Record 2007" for the best classical album of the year. In 2007, "Hallelujah to Love" toured Russia and the CIS. The choir performed four times at the Kremlin and had another concert at State Concert Hall "Rossiya" in Luzhniki. In 2008–2009, they toured Russia, the CIS and the US with the program "And the Show Goes On... ." Their anniversary tour, titled "20 years: 10 voices," took place between 2010–2011.

== Soloists ==
- 1989: Mikhail Turetsky – tenor voice
- 1990: Alex Alexandrov – dramatic baritone
- 1991: Evgeny Kulmis – basso profundo, director of the choir in the past, poet
- 1991: Evgeny Tulinov – dramatic tenor
- 1992: Mikhail Kuznetsov – tenor altino, Distinguished Artist of the Russian Federation
- 1996: Oleg Blyahorchuk, lyric tenor, instrumentalist (piano, guitar, accordion, melodica)
- 2003: Igor Zverev – bass
- 2003: Boris Goryachev – lyric baritone
- 2007: Konstantin Kabo – baritone tenor
- 2009: Vyacheslav Fresh – counter-tenor

== Discography ==
=== High Holidays (Jewish religious songs) ===
1. Ma Tovu
2. Hashkivenu
3. Torah Service
4. Ki Lekach Tov
5. B’rosh Ha Sho No
6. Hayom Haras Olom
7. Shehecheyonu
8. V’al Yde Avodecho
9. Hajjom T’ammezenu
10. Kol Nidrei
11. L’chu N’ranenoh
12. Eil' Melech Yosheiv
13. Himmoze Lonu
14. Kionu Ammecho
15. Classidic Kaddish

=== Bravissimo ===
1. Shiru Shalom
2. Ismechu
3. Ich Hob Dir
4. Russian Mood
5. Memory («Cats»)
6. A Byssele Mazl
7. Подмосковные Вечера
8. Sunrise, Sunset (Fiddler on the Roof)
9. To Life (Fiddler on the Roof)
10. Be My Love
11. Let my people go
12. Hava Nagila

=== Jewish songs ===
1. Ma Tovu
2. Hashkivenu
3. Torah Service
4. Ki Lekach Tov
5. B’rosh Ha Sho No
6. Hayom Haras Olom
7. Shehecheyonu
8. V’al Yde Avodecho
9. Hajjom T’ammezenu
10. Kol Nidrei
11. L’chu N’ranenoh
12. Eil' Melech Yosheiv
13. Himmoze Lonu
14. Kionu Ammecho
15. Classidic Kaddish

=== Star Duets (Russian: Звёздные дуэты) ===
1. The Show Must Go On (with Kirkorov)
2. Memory from Cats (with Laima Vaikule)
3. Venus (with Lolita)
4. Feelings (with Gazmanov)
5. Играл скрипач (with Mikhail Shufutinsky)
6. L`chaim (with Boris Moiseev)
7. Дорогие москвичи (with Laima Vaikule)
8. Ой, мороз, мороз (with Nadezhda Kadysheva)
9. Captain (live with Kobzon)
10. Letka-enka (with Anastasia Stotskaya)
11. O sole mio (live with Nikolai Baskov)

=== Une vie d’amour (Russian: Такая великая любовь) ===
1. Une vie d’amour
2. Composition "Money"
3. Medley "USSR" (a cappella)
4. Un amore cosi grande
5. Прощальная песня
6. Увезу тебя я в тундру
7. Medley "Паровоз" (a cappella)
8. Sports Medley
9. Мы, друзья, перелетные птицы
10. Yerushala’im Shel Zahav
11. Песня старого извозчика (a cappella)
12. Мишка-одессит
13. Nessun Dorma
14. Notre Dame de Paris
15. Bonus (a cappella)

=== When the Men Sing (Russian: Когда поют мужчины) ===
A concert in Haifa, DVD, in 2004. It was performed without Gloria Gaynor and Emma Shapplin.

1. Va pensiero from Nabucco
2. Opera Medley
3. Memory
4. Un amore cosi grande
5. Une vie d’amour
6. Money by ABBA
7. Vedi, Maria/Emma Chapplin-Carmin Meo
8. Zug
9. Песня старого извозчика
10. Мы, друзья, перелётные птицы
11. Meley «Паровоз»
12. Мишка-одессит
13. Medley USSR
14. Hava Nagila
15. Ki mi Tzion, Shma Isroel
16. Yerushalaim Shel Zahav
17. Sim Shalom
18. Let my people go
19. Can't take my eyes
20. Hit the road Jack
21. I will survive – Gloria Gaynor
22. Notre Dame de Paris
23. Medley San Remo
24. Caruso
25. Russian Medley (Русское попурри)
26. Letka-enka (Летка-енка)
27. Мурка
28. O sole mio
29. Diva
30. Финал. Прощальная песня

=== Born to Sing (Russian: Рожденные петь) ===
==== First part ====
1. Aria of Loris from «Fedra»
2. The second aria of Calaf from «Turandot»
3. В горнице моей светло
4. Opera Medley
5. Ariozo of Phantom from «The Phantom of the Opera»
6. Увезу тебя я в тундру
7. Liric scenes from Pushkin
8. Liric scenes from Pushkin
9. Liric scenes from Pushkin
10. Полёт шмеля
11. Medley «Паровоз»
12. Голуби летят над нашей зоной
13. Мишка-одессит
14. Can't Buy Me Love
15. Back in the U.S.S.R.

==== Second part ====
1. Va pensiero from Nabucco
2. Ma tovu (Jewish liturgical song)
3. Requiem movement 7 of Mozart
4. Отче наш
5. Choir of Apostles from Jesus Christ Superstar
6. Sim shalom
7. Окрасился месяц багрянцем
8. Папиросы
9. Two Guitars (Russian: Две гитары)
10. Шар голубой
11. Beigelach (Russian: Бублики)
12. Куплеты Бони из оперетты «Королева чардаша»
13. Мурка
14. Песня о дружбе
15. Прощальная песня из к/ф «Обыкновенное чудо»

=== Great Music (2 CD + DVD) (Russian: Великая музыка) ===
1. Loris's Aria (U.Giordano Fedora)
2. Nessun Dorma. Calaf's Aria (G. Puccini Turandot)
3. V gornitse moey svetlo (I.Yechikov / N.Rubtsov)
4. Opera potpourri (R.Wagner Lohengrin, G.Verdi Il trovatore, W.A. Mozart The Magic Flute, C. Gounod Faust, G. Bizet Carmen)
5. The Music Of The Night (A. Lloyd Webber / C. Hart / Stilgoe R.H.Z.)
6. Une vie d'amour (D.Garvarents / C. Aznavour)
7. Uvezu tebya ya v tundru (М. Fradkin / М. Plyazkovsky)
8. Pushkin's lyric scenes (P.I. Tchaikovsky)
9. The Flight of the Bumblebee (N.A. Rimsky-Korsakov)
10. Parovoz (potpourri)
11. Golubi letyat nad nashey zonoy (V. Dubovskoy)
12. Mishka Odessit (М.Tanachnikov / V. Dykhovichny)
13. Can't Buy Me Love (J. Lennon / P. McCartney)
14. USSR (potpourri)
15. Va pensiero (G. Verdi Nabucco)
16. Ma tovu (Jewish folk song)
17. Lacrymosa (W.А. Mozart)
18. Otche nash / Pater noster (N.N. Kedrov, Russian orthodox prayer)
19. Jesus Christ Superstar (A. Lloyd Webber / T. Rice)
20. Sim Shalom (Jewish prayer) / Lodochka (Т.Khrennikov / М.Matusovsky)
21. Go Down Moses (arr. S. Oliver)
22. Okrasilsya mesyaz bagryantsem (Russian Folk Song)
23. Papirosy (Jewish folk song)
24. Dve guitary (I. Vasiliev / А. Grigoriev)
25. Shar Goluboy (D. Shostakovich)
26. Bubliki (S.Bogomazov / Y.Yadov)
27. Boni's Song. The Czardas Princess (I. Kalman)
28. Letka-Enka (R. Lehtinen / M. Plyatskovsky)
29. Murka (Odessa folk song)
30. Money, money, money (potpourri)
31. Odnozvuchno gremit kolokoltchik (К. Sidorovich / I. Makarov)
32. Pesnya o druzhbe (V. Bulikov)
33. Presentation of Turetsky Choir
34. Davaite negromko (G. Gladkov / Y. Kim)

=== Moscow – Jerusalem (Russian: Москва-Иерусалим) (2 CD + DVD) ===
==== Moscow – Jerusalem CD 1 ====
1. Hu Elokeynu (Jewish folk song)
2. B’rosh ha Shono (I. Malovani)
3. Hodo al Eretz (V. Dubovskoy)
4. Hajjom T'ammezeynu (L. Levandovsky)
5. Shehecheyonu (M. Machtenberg / Vladovsky)
6. Al Naharos Bovel (Z. Zilberts)
7. Kadsheynu B’mitsvosecho (S. Zim)
8. Areshes S'foseynu (M. Kusevitsky)
9. Ma Tovu (L.Levandovsky / Z. Zilberts)
10. Ahavas Olam (L. Levandovsky)
11. Ki mi Tziyon (L. Levandovsky)
12. Torah Service (Jewish prayer)
13. Kol Nidrey (R. Himelstein)
14. Kionu Ammecho (I. Malovani)
15. Shma Isroel (L. Levandovsky)
16. Hayom Haras Olom (Leo)
17. Ki Lekach Tov (D. Roitman / I. Rumshinsky)
18. Hasidic Kaddish (Jewish prayer)
19. Havdola (Z. Zilberts)
20. Hine Ma Tov (A. Kalib)
21. Ismechu (Z. Zilberts)
22. Sabbath Prayer (J. Bock, Fiddler on the Roof)

==== Moscow – Jerusalem CD 2 ====
1. Hava Nagila (Jewish folk song)
2. Bubliki (S. Bogomazov / Y. Yadov)
3. A bissele mazl (Berry Sisters)
4. Shiru Shalom (Y. Rosenblum / Y. Rotblit)
5. Sholom, Sholom (Jewish prayer)
6. Abi Gesund (Jewish folk song, remix)
7. 7/40 (Jewish folk song)
8. A Glesele L' chaim (Jewish folk song, remix)
9. Shar goluboy (D.Shostakovich)
10. Ba mir bistu sheyn (Jewish folk song)
11. Erev shel Shoshanim (M. Dor / Y. Hadar)
12. Hallelujah (Oshrat-Ventoora Kobi / Or Shimrit)
13. L'chaim chaveyrim (Jewish folk song)
14. L'chaim (Jewish folk song)
15. Mamele (Jewish folk song)
16. Od Yishama (Carlebach Shlomo)
17. Yerushalaim (Jewish folk song / A.Hameyiri)
18. Zug (Berry Sisters)
19. Ich Hob Dir (Jewish folk song)
20. Israel, Israel (R. Siegel / S. Meinunger)
21. Tum Balalayka (Jewish folk song) – featuring I. Kobzon

==== Moscow – Jerusalem DVD ====
1. Ma Tovu (L. Levandovsky / Z. Zilberts)
2. Ki Lekach Tov (D. Roitman / I. Rumshinsky)
3. Ismechu (Z. Zilberts)
4. Areshes S'foseynu (M. Kusevitsky)
5. Hine Ma Tov (A. Kalib)
6. Sim Shalom (Abe Nadel)
7. A Glesele l'chaim (Jewish folk song, remix)
8. Velirushalaim Ircho (L. Levandovsky / M. Kusevitsky)

=== Music of all times (Russian: Музыка всех времен) (CD + 2 DVD) ===
==== CD: Music of all time ====
1. Ах, Этот Вечер
2. Ave Maria
3. Almirena's Aria (G.F. Handel Rinaldo)
4. Flight Of The Bumblebee (Tale Of The Tsar Saltan)
5. Song Of The Old Cab
6. Black Eyebrows
7. There Is Only A Moment
8. Looking At The Lake Blue
9. Fantasy on the Theme of "Poljushko-Pole"
10. Letkajenkka (Letkis)
11. Verdimania: Rigoletto, Aida, La Traviata, La Forza del Destino (opera potpourri, G. Verdi)
12. Tango Ostap (A. Zatsepin / N. Derbenev)
13. How Young We Were
14. Тайна / Twilight (ELO)
15. The Show Must Go On (B. May)
16. Hello, Dolly
17. We Are The Champions (F. Mercury)
18. Farewell Song (G. Gladkov / Y. Kim)
19. Bamir Bistu Sheyn (bonus track)

==== DVD 1: Music of all times (The Kremlin, 2006, live) ====
1. Oh, This Evening
2. Ave Maria
3. Almirenas Aria (G.F. Handel Rinaldo)
4. Lacrymosa
5. Our Father
6. Yerushala'im Shel Zahav
7. The Choir Of The Apostles (from Jesus Christ Superstar)
8. Hallelujah From Messiah
9. God Forbid
10. The Opera Medley
11. Flight Of The Bumblebee (from Tale Of The Tsar Saltan)
12. Song Of The Old Cab
13. Mishka-Odessit
14. Black Eyebrows
15. There Is Only A Moment
16. Aria Herman (from Queen Of Spades)
17. Looking At The Lake Blue
18. Oy, Moroz-Moroz
19. Coloured Hues Of The Month
20. Walking Horses
21. Fantasy on the Theme of "Poljushko-Pole"
22. Lizaveta
23. Letkajenkka (Letkis)
24. Historia De Un Amor
25. Honestly
26. Sole Mio
27. Song About Friendship

==== DVD 2: Hallelujah to Love (Russian: Аллилуйя любви) Kremlin, live DVD, 2008 ====
1. Alliluya lyubvi (D. Novikov / S. Olenberg)
2. O Fortuna! (C. Orff Carmina Burana)
3. Verdimania: Rigoletto, Aida, La Traviata, La Forza del Destino (opera potpourri, G. Verdi)
4. Ukrainian Motives (arias from N. Lysenko Natalka-Poltavka, S. Gulak-Artemovky Zaporozhets za Dunaem, V. Ivasyuk Tchervona Ruta)
5. Tango Ostap (A. Zatsepin / N. Derbenev)
6. Kak molody my byli (A. Pakhmutova / N. Dobronravov)
7. Charlie (R. Pauls / I. Reznik)
8. Тайна / Twilight (ELO)
9. The Show Must Go On (B. May)
10. Scorpions' Fantasy
11. Et si tu n'existais pas (P. Delano, C. Lemesle / T. Cutugno, P. Losito)
12. Aspekty lyubvi (potpourri: I. Dunaevsky / V. Lebedev-Kumach "Kak mnogo devushek horoshikh", T. Mauss / E. Renalls "Sex Bomb", A. Bard / J.P. Barda / M. Dornonville / D. Peczynski / A. Wollbeck "Sexual Revolution")
13. Winter Medley "Tundra"
14. Hello, Dolly (J. Herman)
15. Storie di tutti i giorni (M. Fabrizio / G. Morra)
16. Vivo Per Lei
17. Ba Mir Bistu Sheyn
18. Hava Nagila (Jewish folk song)
19. Boni's Song. The Czardas Princess (I. Kalman)
20. Blue Fog
21. We Are The Champions (F. Mercury)
22. Farewell Song (G. Gladkov / Y. Kim)
