= Chief Rabbi of Russia =

Leader of the Jewish communities in Russia

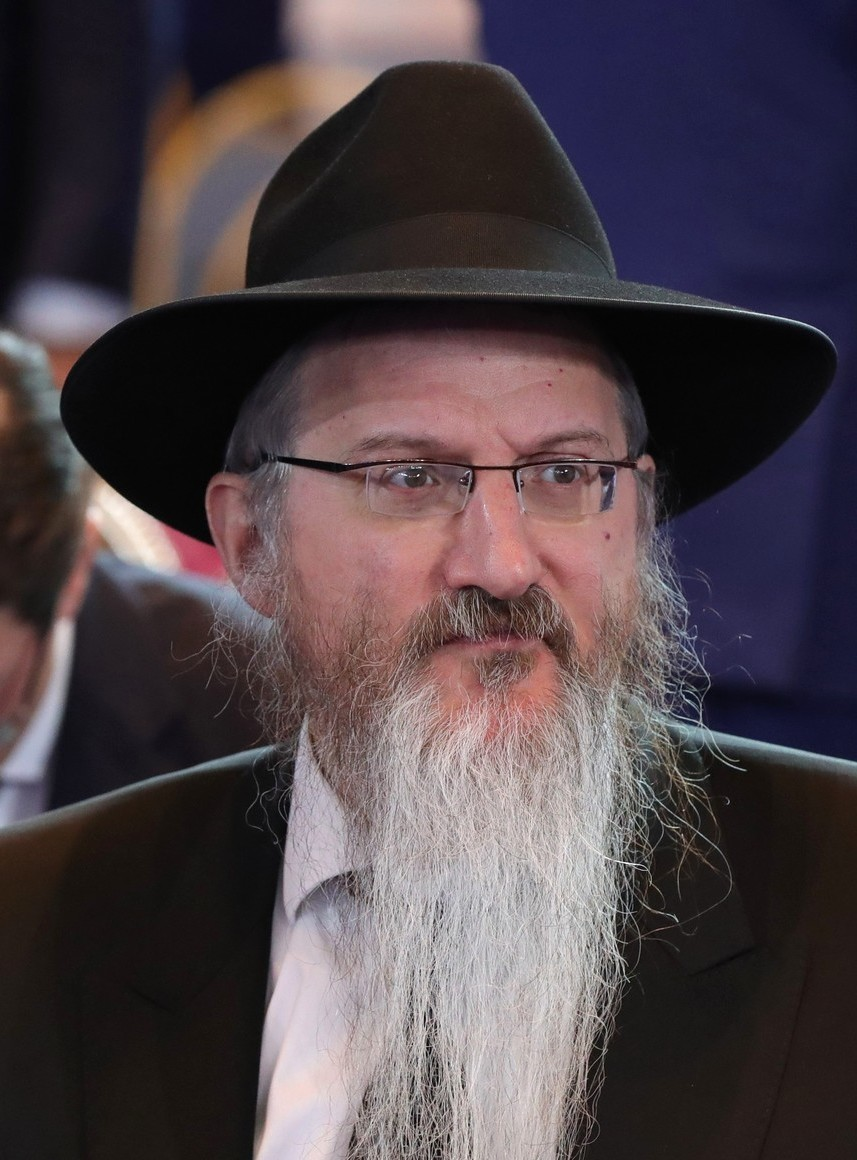
- Incumbent; Berel Lazar since 1999
- Residence: Jewish Community Center in Moscow
- Appointer: FJCR Executive board
- Inaugural holder: Adolf Shayevich
- Formation: 1993
- Website: Official website(in English)

The Chief Rabbi of Russia (Hebrew: הרב הראשי לרוסיה) is the leader of the Jewish communities in Russia since 1990. Currently there are two Chief Rabbis of Russia: Rabbi Berel Lazar of Chabad and Adolf Shayevich from the Congress of the Jewish Religious Organizations and Associations in Russia (KEROOR). The largest network of Jewish organizations is the Federation of Jewish Communities of Russia.

Shayevich was appointed in 1989. In 2000, Rabbi Lazar was appointed chief rabbi of Russia by the election of the Federation of Jewish Communities of Russia, and since then he has been working in this role. However, not all Jewish communities in Russia recognize him as chief rabbi, with KEROOR and other organizations continuing to see Rabbi Shayevich as chief rabbi of Russia in his position as chief rabbi of the Congress of Jewish Religious Organizations and Associations in Russia.

== The Chief Rabbi of the Russian Armed Forces ==
Rabbi Aharon Gurevich (Colonel) was the first chief rabbi of the Russian Army since the 1917 Bolshevik Revolution. He was appointed in December 2007 by Rabbi Berel Lazar. He is considered as the Chief rabbi of the FSIN (Federal Prisons Service) and the Russian armed forces.

== Chief Rabbis ==
- Adolf Shayevich (1983, officially 1993–present)
- Berel Lazar (1999–present)
