= Aharon Gurevich =

Russian rabbi

Colonel Rabbi Aharon Gurevich
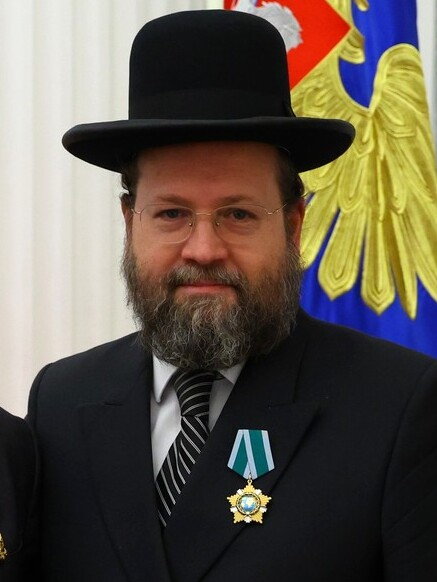
- 2023

Religious life
- Religion: Judaism
- Position: Chief Rabbi
- Organisation: Russian Army
- Began: December 2007

Colonel Rabbi Aharon Gurevich was appointed by Russian Chief Rabbi Berel Lazar, in December 2007 as the first Chief Rabbi of the Russian Army since the 1917 Bolshevik Revolution.
