= Anti-Zionist Committee of the Soviet Public =

Soviet anti-Zionist organisation

The Anti-Zionist Committee of the Soviet Public (Russian: Антисионистский комитет советской общественности, Antisionistsky komitet sovyetskoy obshchestvennosti; abbreviated AZCSP Russian: АКСО) was a body formed in 1983 in the Soviet Union as an anti-Zionist propaganda tool.

== Foundation and anti-Zionist manifesto ==
The formation of the AZCSP was approved on 29 March 1983 by the Secretariat of the Central Committee of the Communist Party of the Soviet Union in resolution 101/62ГС: "Support the proposition of the Department of Propaganda of the Central Committee and the KGB USSR about the creation of the Anti-Zionist Committee of the Soviet Public …"

On 1 April 1983, Pravda ran a full front-page article titled "From the Soviet Leadership":

"By its nature, Zionism concentrates ultranationalism, chauvinism and racial intolerance, excuse for territorial occupation and annexation, military opportunism, cult of political promiscuousness and irresponsibility, demagogy and ideological diversion, dirty tactics and perfidy […] Absurd are attempts of Zionist ideologists to present those who criticize them, or condemn the aggressive politics of Israel's ruling circles, as antisemitic […] We call on all Soviet citizens: workers, peasants, representatives of intelligentsia: to take active part in exposing Zionism, strongly rebuke its endeavors; social scientists: to activate scientific research to criticize the reactionary core of that ideology and the aggressive character of its political practice; writers, artists, journalists: to more fully expose the anti-popular and anti-humane diversionary character of the propaganda and politics of Zionism […]" (highlights preserved)

The 1983 anti-Zionist statement published in Pravda rejected claims that a "Jewish question" existed in the Soviet Union, and denounced "international Zionism" as hostile to Soviet society. It called for the creation of an "Anti-Zionist Committee of the Soviet Public" and urged Soviet citizens to take part in an ideological struggle against Zionism. The statement was signed by eight Soviet Jews:

- David Abramovich Dragunsky, Colonel-General, twice the Hero of the Soviet Union
- Samuel Zivs, law professor
- Genrikh Gofman
- Yuri Kolesnikov
- Martin Kabachnik, Lenin Prize winner
- Gregory Bondarevsky, history professor
- Boris Sheinin, filmmaker
- Henrikas Zimanas, philosopher

== Background and history ==
From late 1944, Joseph Stalin adopted a pro-Zionist foreign policy, apparently believing that the new country would be socialist and would speed the decline of British influence in the Middle East. Accordingly, in November 1947, the Soviet Union, together with the other Soviet bloc countries, voted in favor of the United Nations Partition Plan for Palestine, which paved the way for the creation of the State of Israel. On May 17, 1948, three days after Israel declared its independence, the Soviet Union officially granted de jure recognition of Israel, becoming only the second country to recognise the Jewish state (preceded only by the United States' de facto recognition), and the first country to grant Israel de jure recognition.

David Abramovich Dragunsky, Colonel-General, twice Hero of the Soviet Union and commander of the 55th Guards Tank Brigade during the Great Patriotic War was designated its chairman.

In November 1975, the leading Soviet historian academic M. Korostovtsev wrote a letter to the Secretary of the Central Committee, Mikhail Suslov, regarding the book The encroaching counterrevolution by prominent Zionologist Vladimir Begun: "[…] it perceptibly stirs up antisemitism under the flag of anti-Zionism".

In addition to mass media and publishing, the AZCSP's projects included the "International symposium on contemporary problems of anti-Zionism" and preparation for an "International anti-Zionist congress".

By the end of the 1980s, with the new policies of glasnost and perestroika, and with the impending dissolution of the Soviet Union, the Soviet authorities cancelled many of the committee’s plans. It was formally dismantled in October 1994.

== List of members ==
- David Dragunsky, chairman – colonel general, Hero of the Soviet Union (twice)
- Samuil Zivs – law professor
- Mark Krupkin, v.c. – editor, vice-chairman of Agenstvo Pechati Novosti (APN) publishing house, director of Literaturnaya gazeta
- Elina Bystritskaya – actress
- I. P. Belyayev – economist
- Yuri Kolesnikov – writer
- Martin Kabachnik – chemist, Hero of Socialist Labor
- Teodor Oizerman – philosopher
- Vladimir Kudryavtsev – legal scholar, member of the Academy of Sciences of the USSR
- Matvey Blanter – composer, Hero of Socialist Labor
- Angelina Stepanova – artist, Hero of Socialist Labor
- Tatyana Lioznova – film director
- Boris Sheinin – cinematographer
- A. K. Marinich – director of a kolkhoz, Hero of Socialist Labor
- Genrikh Gofman – writer, Hero of the Soviet Union
- Caesar Solodar – writer
- Aron Vergelis – poet
- Genrikh Zimanas – journalist and professor
- Yakov Fishman – chief rabbi of Moscow (died a few months after the creation of the committee)
- Adolf Shayevich – the chief rabbi of Moscow (declared in January 1989 that he was no longer a member)

and others.

== See also ==
- Anti-Zionism
- History of the Jews in Russia and Soviet Union
- Soviet Anti-Zionism
- Refusenik
- Jackson–Vanik amendment
- Jewish Anti-Fascist Committee
- Yevsektsiya
