= Zhukovka Jewish Cultural and Religious Center =

- Established: 2015
- Founder: Chief rabbi Alexander Boroda
- Type: Nonprofit
- Purpose: Orthodox Jewish outreach
- Headquarters: Moscow, Russia
- Affiliations: Orthodox Judaism
- Website: jcczhukovka.com

The Zhukovka Jewish Cultural and Religious Center (JCC Zhukovka) is the largest Jewish Community Center of Orthodox Judaism in Russia. It was established in 2015 in the Zhukovka village of the Pervomayskoye Settlement of Moscow; it is situated at the Rublyovo-Uspenskoye Highway.

The Zhukovka JCC includes a synagogue, a library, an educational center for children, a hotel, a kosher restaurant and a concert hall.

== History ==
Development of a center for the Jewish community was initiated by the FJCR President Rabbi Alexander Boroda in 2009. With his guidance, the Zhukovka Jewish Cultural and Religious Center was opened six years later, in 2015. Alexander Boroda remains the center’s chief rabbi since its opening.

The Ashkenazi Chief Rabbi of Israel David Lau and Governor of Moscow Oblast Andrey Vorobyov took part in the grand opening of the Zhukovka JCC.

The building is approximately sixty thousand square feet; it accommodates a synagogue, a concert hall and a banquet hall, a library, an educational center for children and a kosher restaurant. The British branch of the architecture firm Gensler designed the center at FJCR’s request — from the aerial view it resembles a planted seed with a tree sprouting from it. The building is situated in a park zone at the Rublyovo-Uspenskoye Highway, next to the Panda Adventure Park and a guest house.

The synagogue of the Zhukovka JCC is built in accordance with all the precepts of Judaism and allows for observance of chuppahs, brit milahs, pidyon habens and bar-mitzvahs — every ceremony integral for Jewish life. The roof of the synagogue can be partially opened up, making it possible to place a chuppah inside the building and, as Judaism dictates, under the open sky. The synagogue also stores seven Torah scrolls and a library of books, most of which are in Hebrew.

In July 2016 an opening of a women’s mikvah took place in the center.

In 2018 the center was the first religious building to be awarded with the architectural prize of the International Property Awards; it won in the categories of Public Service Development, Public Service Architecture and Public Service Interior. The award ceremony was held in October 2018 in London.

== Activities ==
The Zhukovka JCC organizes family celebrations, concerts and movie screenings, exhibitions and other cultural and educational activities. It hosts daily community prayers, Jewish rituals and holidays, Torah lessons and Hebrew classes.
