= Moscow Choral Synagogue =

Orthodox synagogue in Moscow, Russia

- Russian: Mocковская хopaльнaя синaгoга
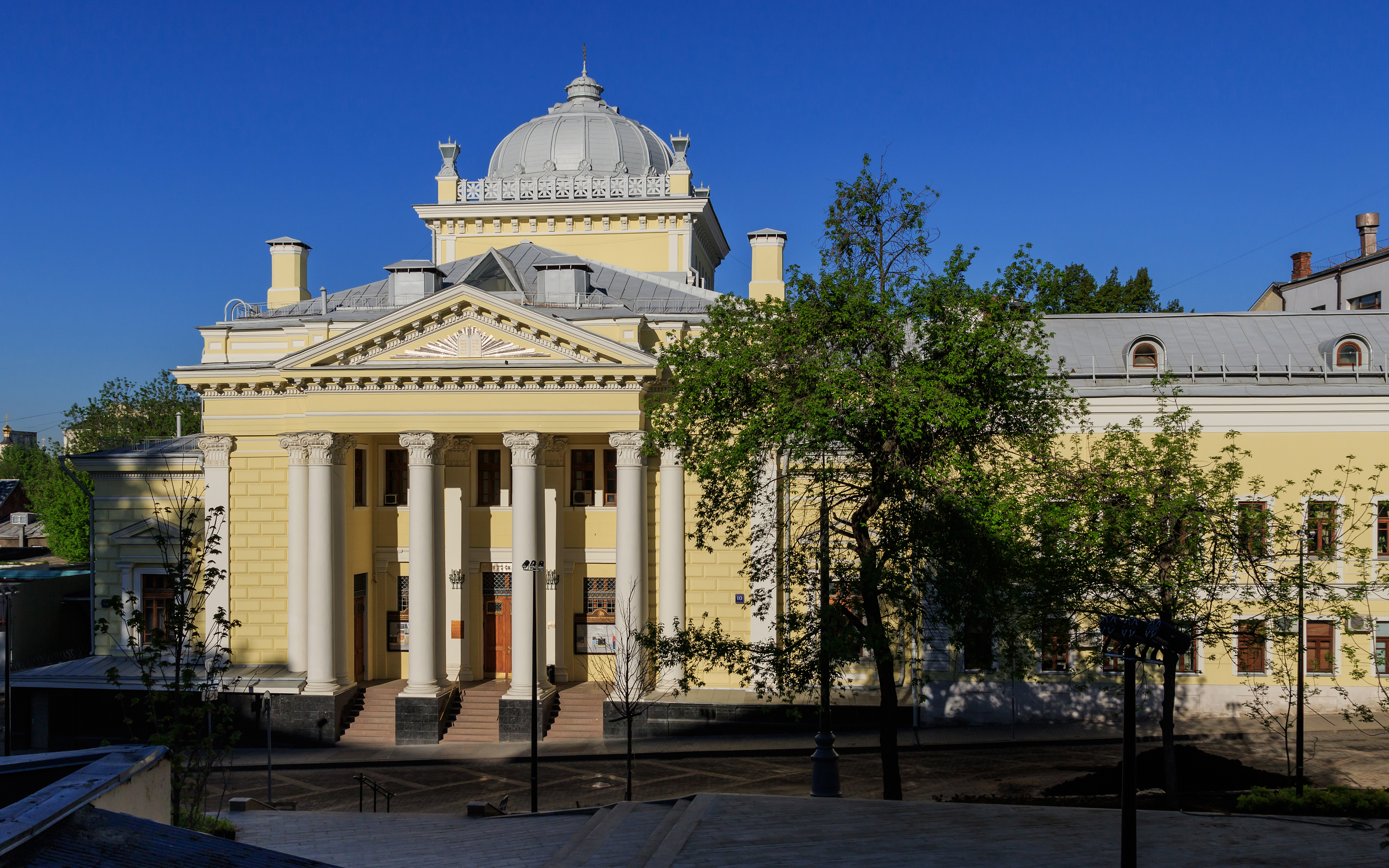
- The synagogue in 2017

- Location of the synagogue in Moscow

Religion
- Affiliation: Orthodox Judaism
- Ecclesiastical or organisational status: Synagogue
- Leadership: Chief Rabbi Adolf Shayevich
- Year consecrated: 1906
- Status: Active

Location
- Location: 10 Bolshoy Spasoglinischevsky Lane, Moscow
- Country: Russia
- Coordinates: 55°45′20″N 37°38′7″E

Architecture
- Architects: Semeon Eibuschitz; Roman Klein
- Type: Synagogue architecture
- Style: Eclectism
- Groundbreaking: 1887
- Completed: 1906

Website
- jewishcom.ru

The Moscow Choral Synagogue (Russian: Московская Хopaльнaя Cинaгoга, Moskovskaya Khoralnaya Sinagoga; Hebrew: בית כנסת הכוראלי של מוסקבה) is an Orthodox Jewish congregation and synagogue, located at 10 Bolshoy Spasoglinischevsky Lane, in the central Basmanny District of Moscow, Russia. It is the main synagogue in Russia and it is located close to Kitai-Gorod Metro station.

Chief Rabbi Adolf Shayevich is its spiritual head.

== History ==
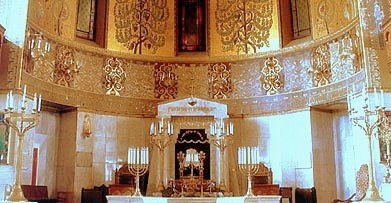
Synagogue's interior

The synagogue is located close to the former Jewish settlement in Zaryadye. Moscow city authorities had officially banned synagogue construction inside Kitai-gorod, and thus the synagogue was built one block east from its walls. In 1881, the community hired architect Semeon Eibuschitz, an Austrian citizen working in Moscow. However, his 1881 draft plan was not approved by authorities. The second draft, also by Eibuschitz, was approved in July, 1886, and construction began on May 28, 1887. In 1888, the city intervened again and required the builders to remove the completed dome and the exterior image of the scrolls of Moses. Construction dragged on for five years, until the authorities once again banned it in 1892, giving two choices: sell the unfinished building or convert it into a charity.

During the Russian Revolution of 1905, the Czarist government was forced to lift all bans on worship, so Jews, Old Believers, and other minority faith groups were free to build their places of worship anywhere. Eibuschitz had died in 1898, and so the community hired architect Roman Klein to finish the construction. The synagogue opened in 1906. It operated throughout the Soviet period, although authorities annexed some parts of the original building for secular purposes in 1923 and 1960.

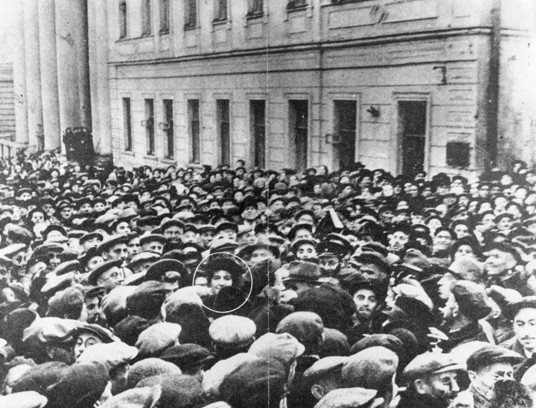
Israeli ambassador to the Soviet Union Golda Meir surrounded by crowd of 50,000 Jews near the Synagogue on the first day of Rosh Hashanah in 1948.

In October, 1948, Golda Meir, the first representative from Israel to the Soviet Union, paid an unauthorized visit to the synagogue to attend Rosh Hashana and Yom Kippur services, enraging the Soviet government.

When the final illness of Joseph Stalin was announced in March 1953, the chief rabbi held a special service and called for fasting and prayer that the dictator might recover.

The synagogue has been recently restored. Since 1990, it has been known for the Turetsky Choir Art Group.

== Rabbis ==
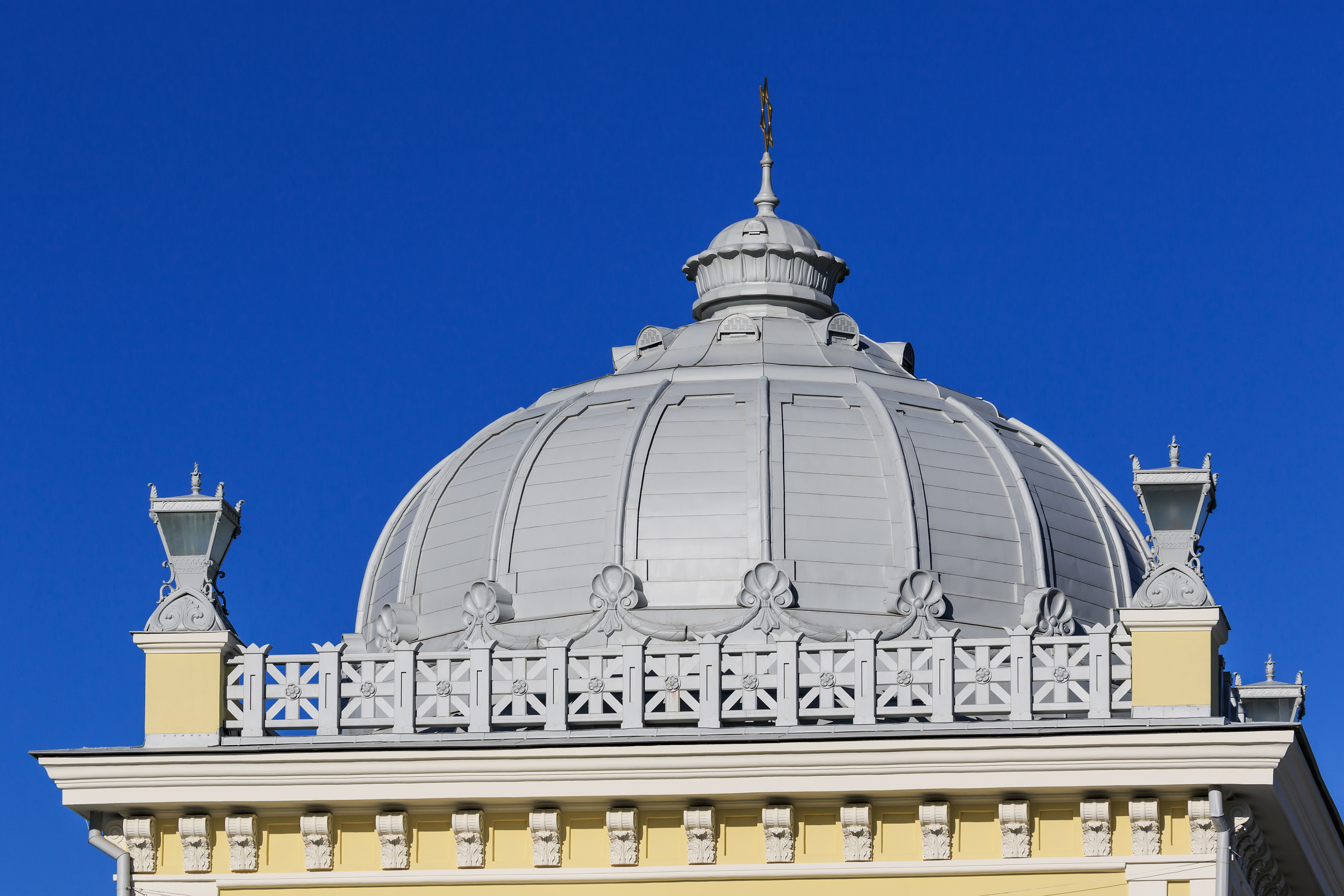
Dome of the synagogue

The chief Moscow rabbi up to 1938, Shmarya Yehuda Leib Medalia, born in Lithuania in 1872, started his rabbinical service in Tula, then a small provincial town about 100 miles from Moscow, and later moved to serve a much larger and more vibrant Jewish community in the Belarusian city of Vitebsk. By the time of revolution of 1917, the rabbi had six sons and five daughters. In the 1920s, he was invited to take over the Moscow Choral Synagogue, and the family moved to the Soviet capital. He had become a follower of the Chabad-Lubavitch Rebbe, Rabbi Yosef Yitzchak Schneersohn, who was exiled by the Soviets and at the time lived in Poland. To be an active religious leader, especially a Jewish one, under the Communists was an uneasy task, and the Moscow Rabbi was permanently harassed by the authorities, chased from a Moscow apartment and forced to settle outside the city limits. Captain of the State Security Aronov wrote, in a report of Dec. 28, 1937, that Rabbi Medalie maintained “illegal” relations with Rabbi Schneerson. Captain Aronov requested a prosecutor's sanction for search and arrest. The rabbi was arrested on January 4, 1938. A short closed session of the Military Board of the Supreme Court of the USSR met on April 26, 1938, without calling prosecutors, defence attorneys and witnesses, and sentenced the rabbi to immediate execution by firing. The rabbi was shot the same day. On December 7, 1957, the sentence was vacated "due to the absence of a crime."

- Yehuda Leib Levin, ? - 1971.
- Yakov Fishman, 1972–1983.
- Adolf Shayevich, since 1983.

== See also ==
- History of the Jews in Moscow
- List of synagogues in Russia
