= Berel Lazar =

Orthodox, Chabad-Lubavitch Hasidic russian rabbi

Rabbi Berel Lazar
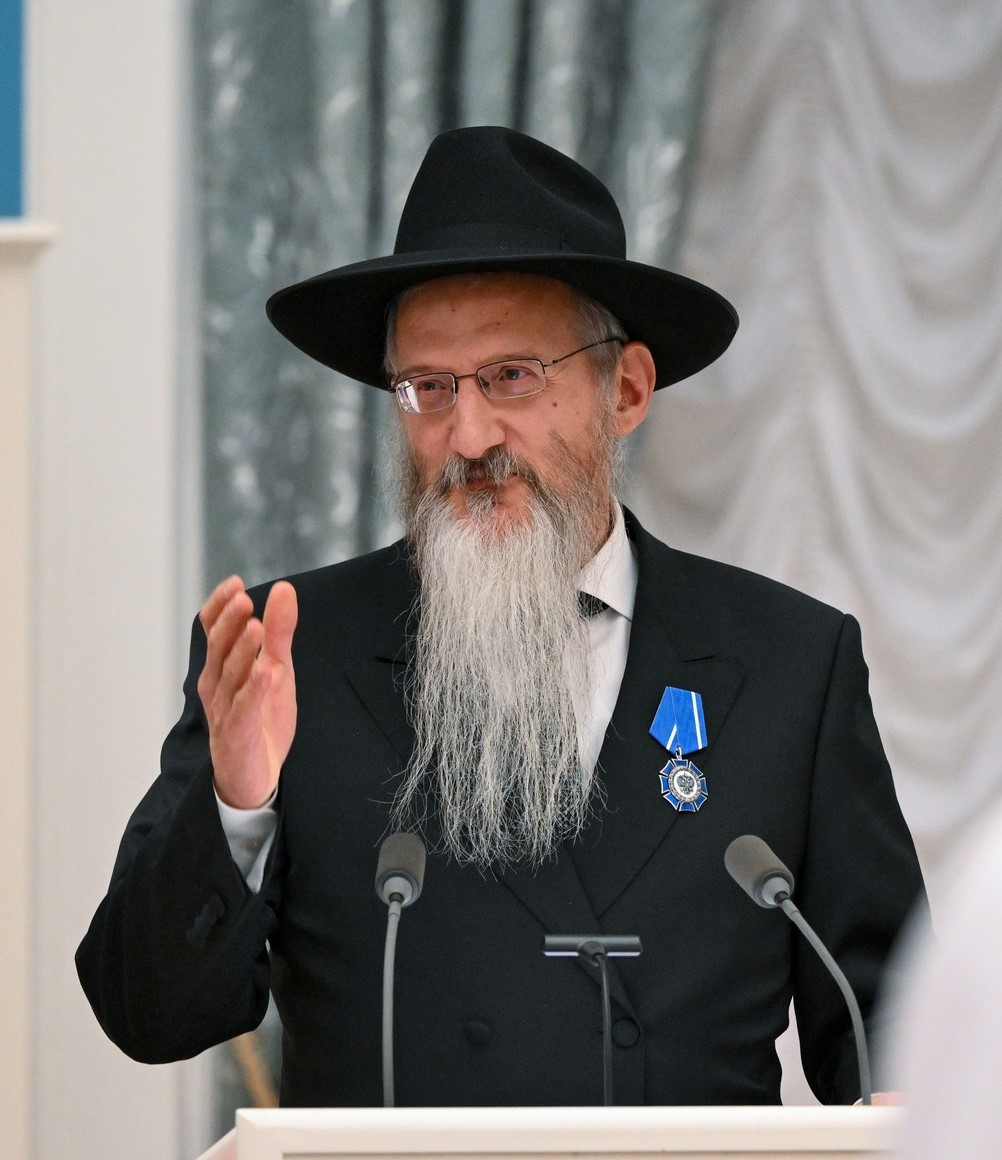
- Lazar in November 2025

Personal life
- Born: May 19, 1964 (age 62) Milan, Italy
- Spouse: Channa Deren
- Children: 13: Bluma, Yechezkel, Mendel, Sholom, Fradel, Yisrael, Levi Yitzchak, Leah, Sara, Bracha, Rivka, Miriam, Shaina
- Dynasty: Chabad Lubavitch
- Education: Rabbinical College of America

Religious life
- Religion: Judaism
- Denomination: Hasidic Judaism

Jewish leader
- Position: Chief Rabbi of Russia
- Organisation: Federation of Jewish Communities of Russia
- Began: June 13, 2000
- Dynasty: Chabad Lubavitch

Shlomo Dov Pinchas Lazar (born May 19, 1964), better known as Berel Lazar, is an Orthodox, Chabad-Lubavitch Hasidic rabbi. He began his service in Russia in 1990. Known for his friendship with Vladimir Putin, since 2000, he has been a Chief Rabbi of Russia (one of two claimants to the title), and chairman of the Federation of Jewish Communities of Russia and Federation of Jewish Communities of the CIS. In September 2005 Lazar became a member of the Public Chamber of Russia. Because of his connections to Russian President Vladimir Putin he is sometimes called "Putin's rabbi."

== Biography ==
A native of Milan, Italy, Lazar was born in 1964 to parents who were among the first emissaries of Rabbi Menachem Mendel Schneerson. Until the age of 15, he studied in Milan’s Merkaz Jewish Day School. Afterwards, he went on to study in New York and pursued a Bachelor of Arts degree in religious studies at the Rabbinical College of America in Morristown, New Jersey. At the age of 23, he was ordained at the Central Lubavitch Yeshiva in New York City.

Since 1990 Lazar has been rabbi of the synagogue in Maryina roshcha District of Moscow. In 1992 Lazar became acquainted with Israeli diamantaire Lev Leviev, who introduced him to Russian businessmen Boris Berezovsky and Roman Abramovich. The latter became the major benefactor of the synagogue in Maryina roshcha.

In 1992, Lazar was appointed chairman of the Rabbinical Alliance of the Commonwealth of Independent States (CIS).

In early 1990s Lazar participated in activity of Congress of the Jewish Religious Organizations and Associations in Russia (CJROAR), was an active participant of founding congress of Russian Jewish Congress in 1996 and even was a member of RJC Presidium. In 1997 he helped establish the Federation of Jewish Communities of the CIS representing Chabad communities in 15 countries of the former Soviet Union.

At the first congress of Federation of Jewish Communities of Russia (FJCR) opened on November 15, 1999 he was elected chief Rabbi of FJCR. According to many analytics, FJCR structure was created as counterbalance to the Russian Jewish Congress (headed by Vladimir Gusinsky) and CJROAR (chief Rabbi — Adolf Shayevich). In the same month Lazar had his first meeting with Vladimir Putin. On May 29, 2000 Berel Lazar became a citizen of Russia, while retaining his U.S. citizenship.

On June 13, 2000, 25 rabbis of the FJCR elected Lazar as Chief Rabbi of Russia, deepening a conflict with mainstream Orthodox and Reform Jewish groups in Russia that continued to recognize Adolf Shayevich as Chief Rabbi. Shayevich accused the Kremlin of meddling in internal Jewish affairs and favoring FJCR over the Vladimir Gusinsky-funded Russian Jewish Congress as the umbrella group of Russia's Jews. Gusinsky was arrested earlier in the month and seen as a business rival to Kremlin insiders. Chief Rabbi of Moscow Pinchas Goldschmidt stated that his community would not recognize Lazar's election. Mikhail Chlenov, head of the Va'ad umbrella organization stated that Lazar's election meant that he was only elected Chief Chabad Rabbi in Russia.

On September 18, 2000, in the presence of President of Russia Vladimir Putin, the Moscow Jewish Community Center was opened in Maryina Roshcha District, where on December 21, 2000 Vladimir Putin and Moscow mayor Yury Luzhkov lit Hanukkah candles.

In 2000, Lazar was appointed to Russia's Council for Coordination of Religious Associations. In 2002, Lazar was elected the Chairman of the Rabbinical Council of the World Congress of Russian Jewry. On January 23, 2001 he participated in the official meeting with President of Israel Moshe Katsav in the Kremlin.

On March 20, 2001 under instruction of the President Vladimir Putin, Lazar was included in the Presidential Council for Interaction with Religious Organizations and Unions; simultaneously Shayevich was excluded from the Council. According to both the Russian government and Federation of Jewish Communities, he is the Chief Rabbi of Russia.

Lazar spoke out against the Russian invasion of Ukraine in 2022, called Russia to withdraw and for an end to the war, and offered to mediate.

== Views ==
=== Interfaith dialogue ===
Lazar is an advocate of interfaith dialogue and sits on the Board of World Religious Leaders for The Elijah Interfaith Institute.

== Awards ==
In 2004, Russian President Vladimir Putin signed an edict to honor him with the Order of Friendship. This award was presented for the contribution made by Lazar to developing culture and strengthening friendship between nations within Russia. In December 2004, he was honored with a national public award, the 'Minin and Pozharsky' Order "for his great personal contribution to strengthening the moral and cultural fabric of the Russian State and for reviving spiritual life and religious freedom in the country". In June 2005, he was awarded the Medal "60 Years of the Victory in the Great Patriotic War 1941-1945". He received the medal during the 19th session of the Russian 'Pobeda' (Victory) Organizational Committee. In September 2005, he received the 'Peter the Great' First Class Order. The diploma attached to the Order explains that the Chief Rabbi was honored with this award "considering his activities in advancing inter-ethnic and inter-religious relations, and his great contribution to the spiritual rebirth of Russia’s Jewish community and to strengthening Russian state".

At the sixtieth anniversary commemoration of the liberation of Auschwitz at the concentration camp, Putin gave a speech. His speech was followed by Lazar awarding Putin the so-called Salvation Medal as a symbol of "the Jewish people's gratitude" to Russia for liberating the camp.

== Gallery ==
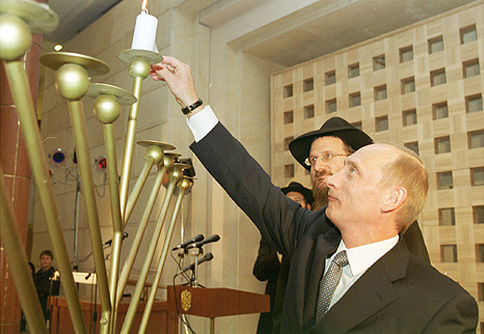
President Putin with Lazar during the Hanukkah holiday at the Jewish Community Center in Moscow

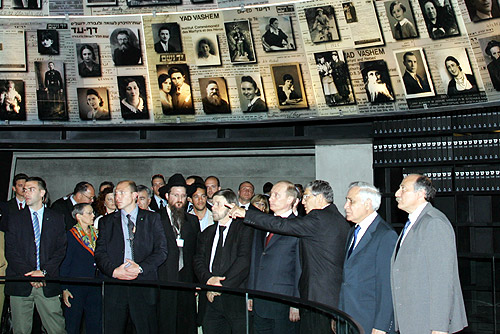
Putin and Lazar visiting the Hall of Names at Yad Vashem with Israeli president Moshe Katsav, April 2005

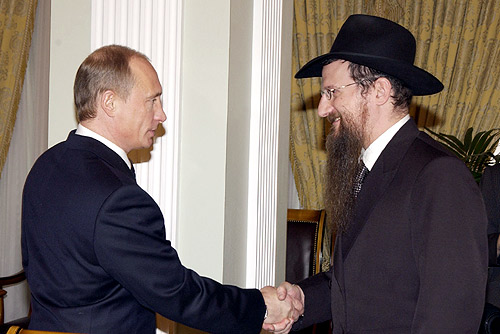

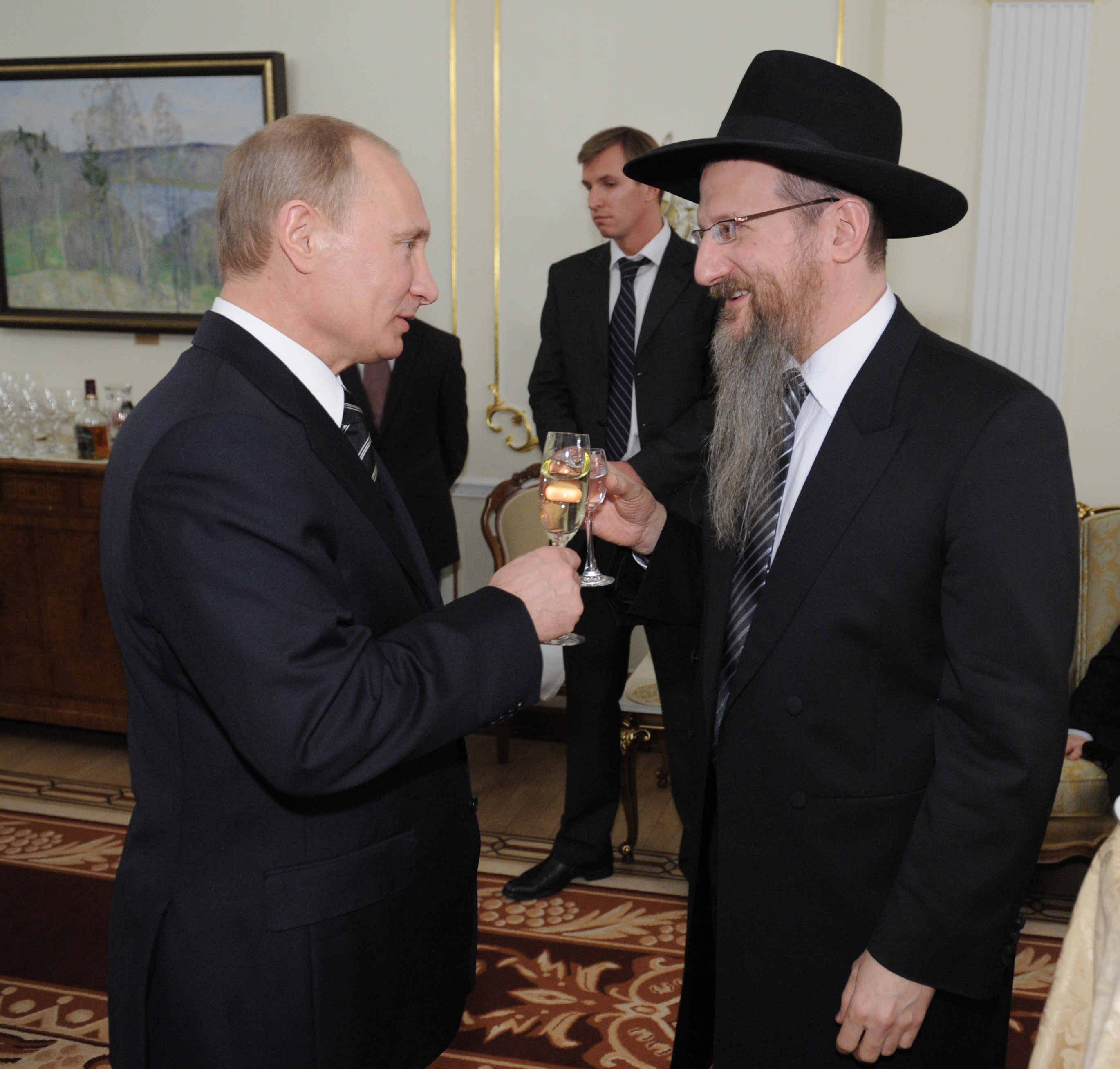

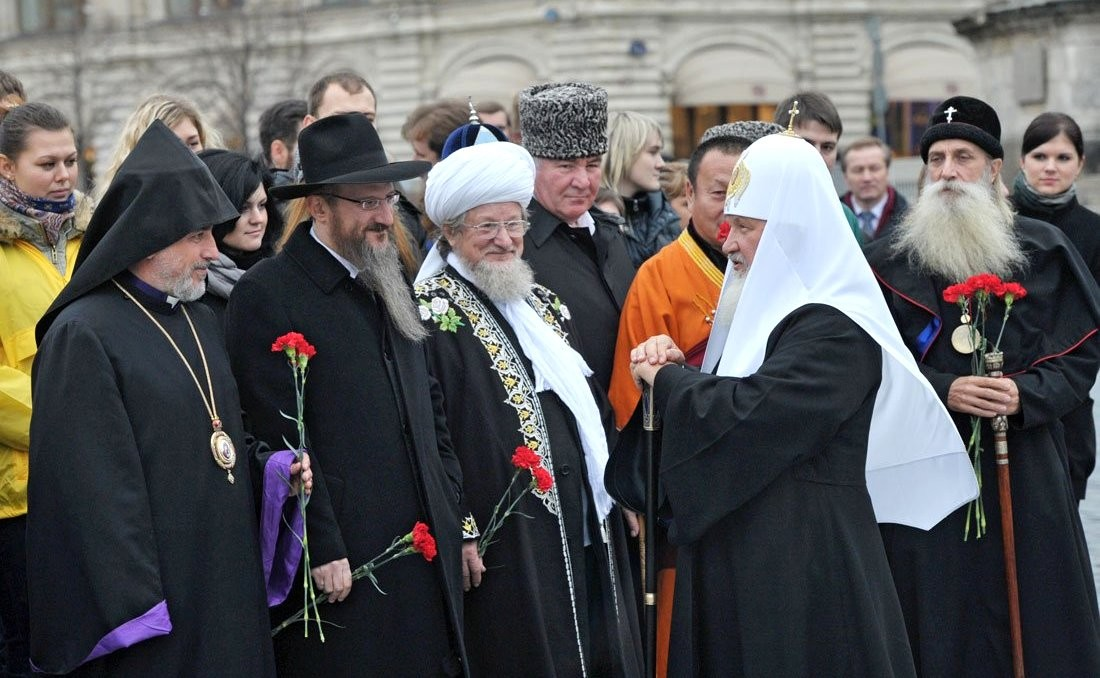
Lazar among other Russian religious leaders including Patriarch Kirill and Talgat Tadzhuddin, November 2012

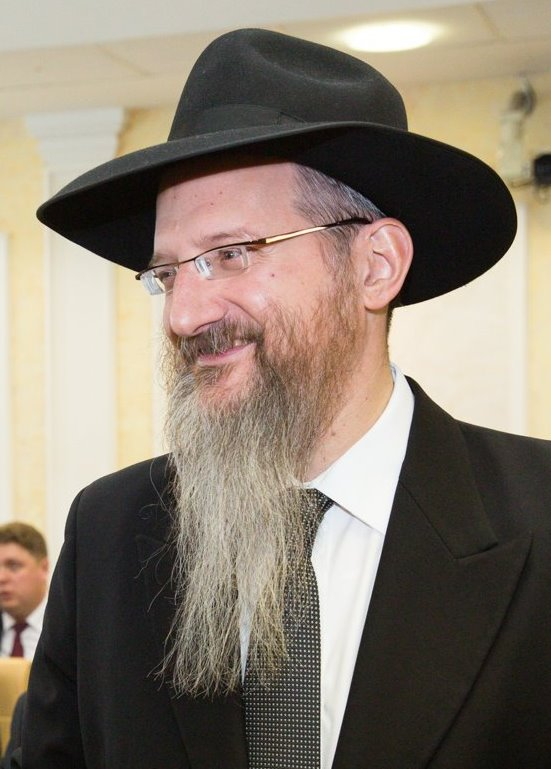

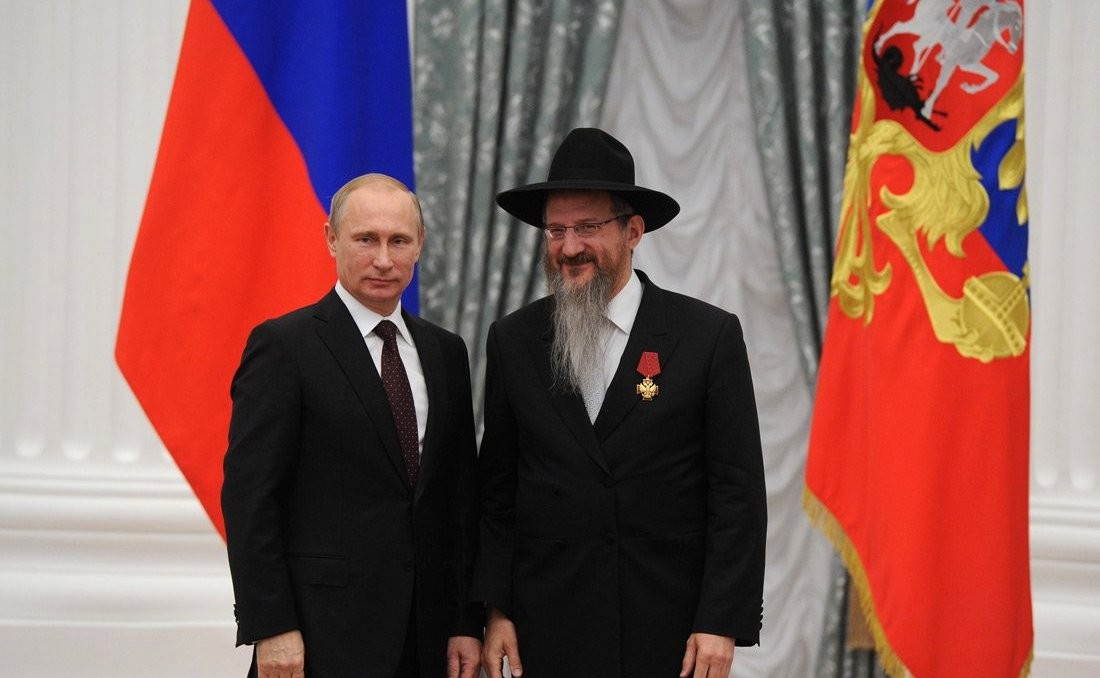
Lazar receives the Order "For Merit to the Fatherland", 4th class from President Putin, 31 July 2014

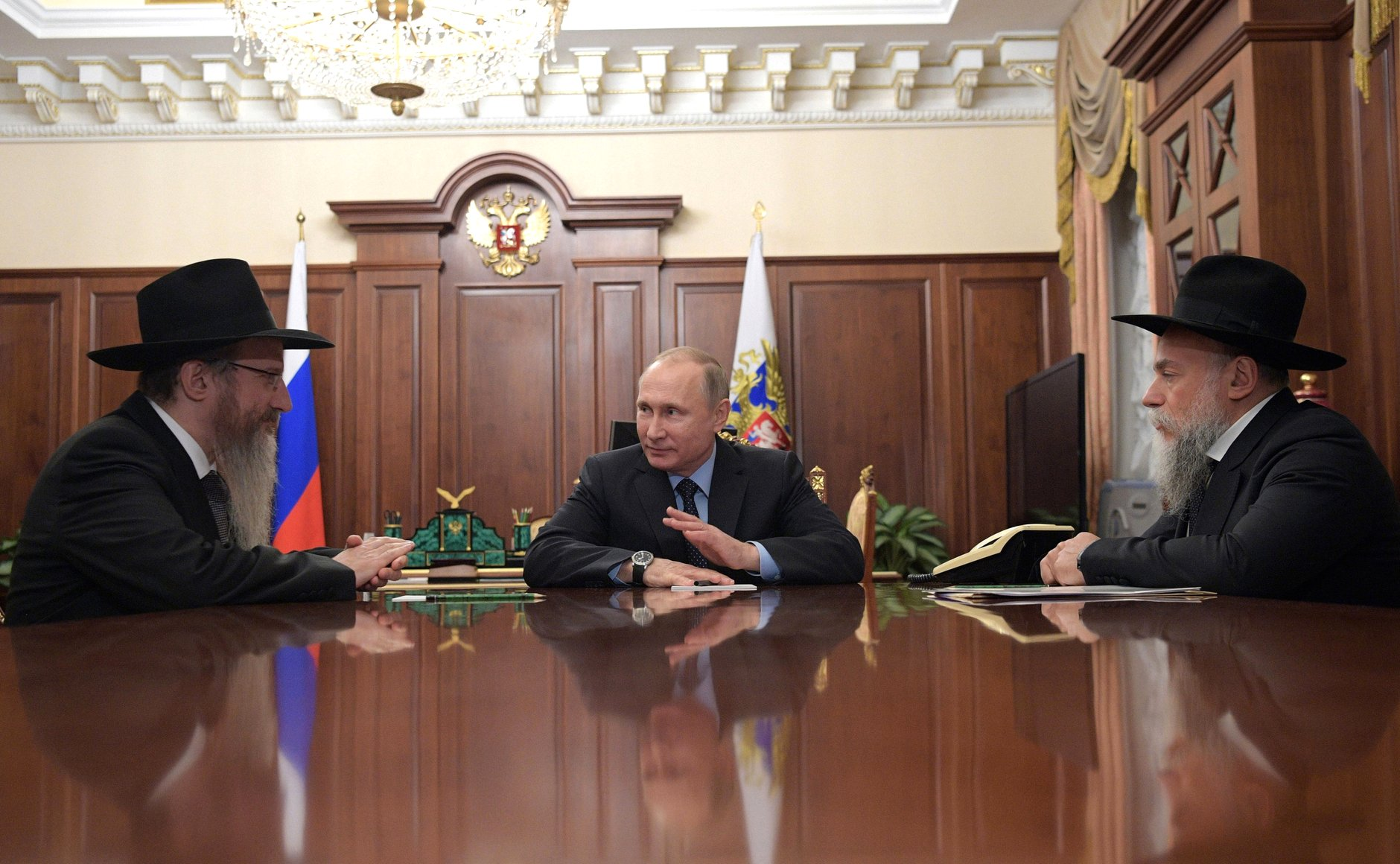
Putin, Lazar and Aleksandr Boroda, president of the Federation of Jewish Communities of Russia, 2016

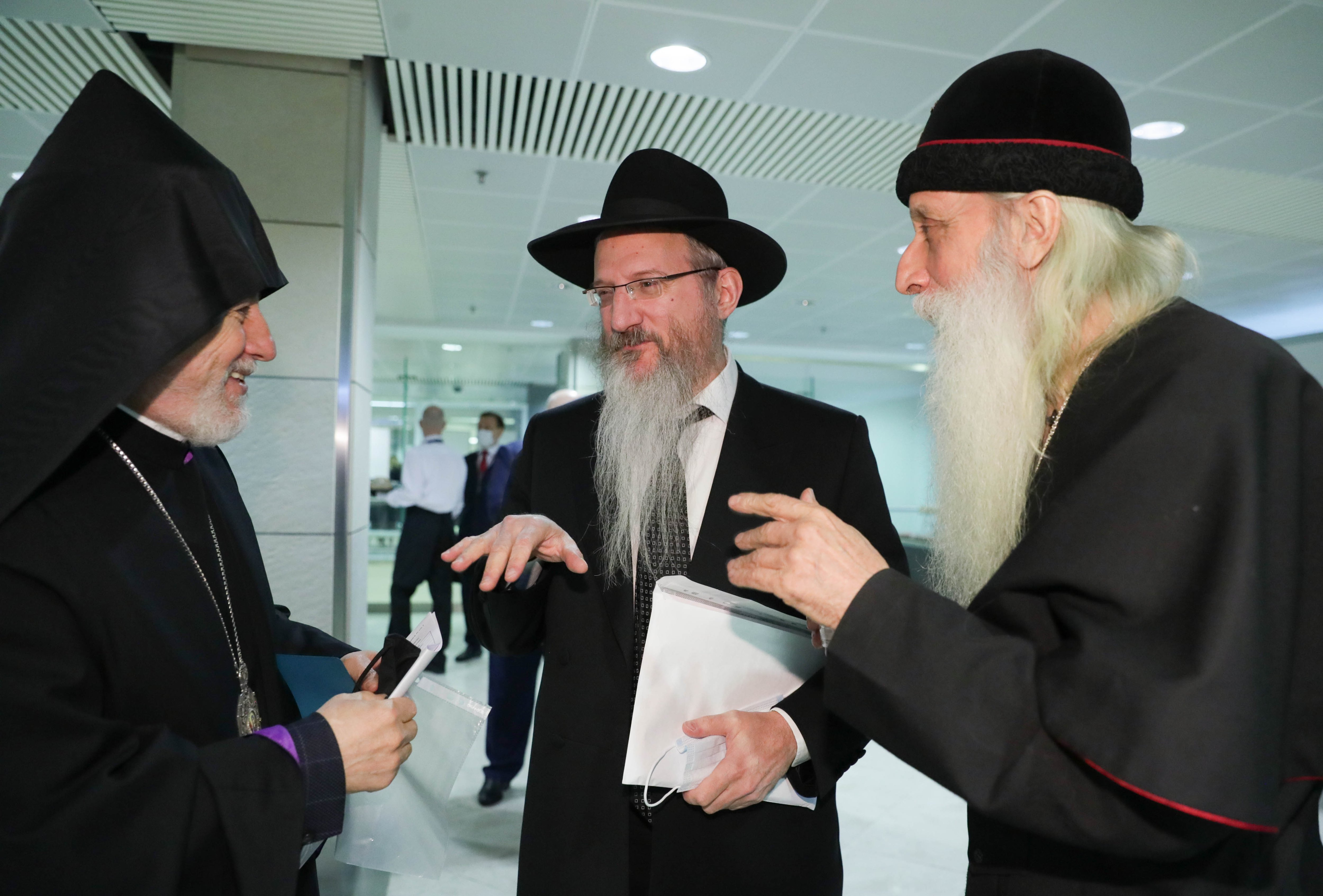
Lazar with Catholicos of All Armenians Karekin II and Metropolitan of the Russian Orthodox Old-Rite Church Cornelius, 2021

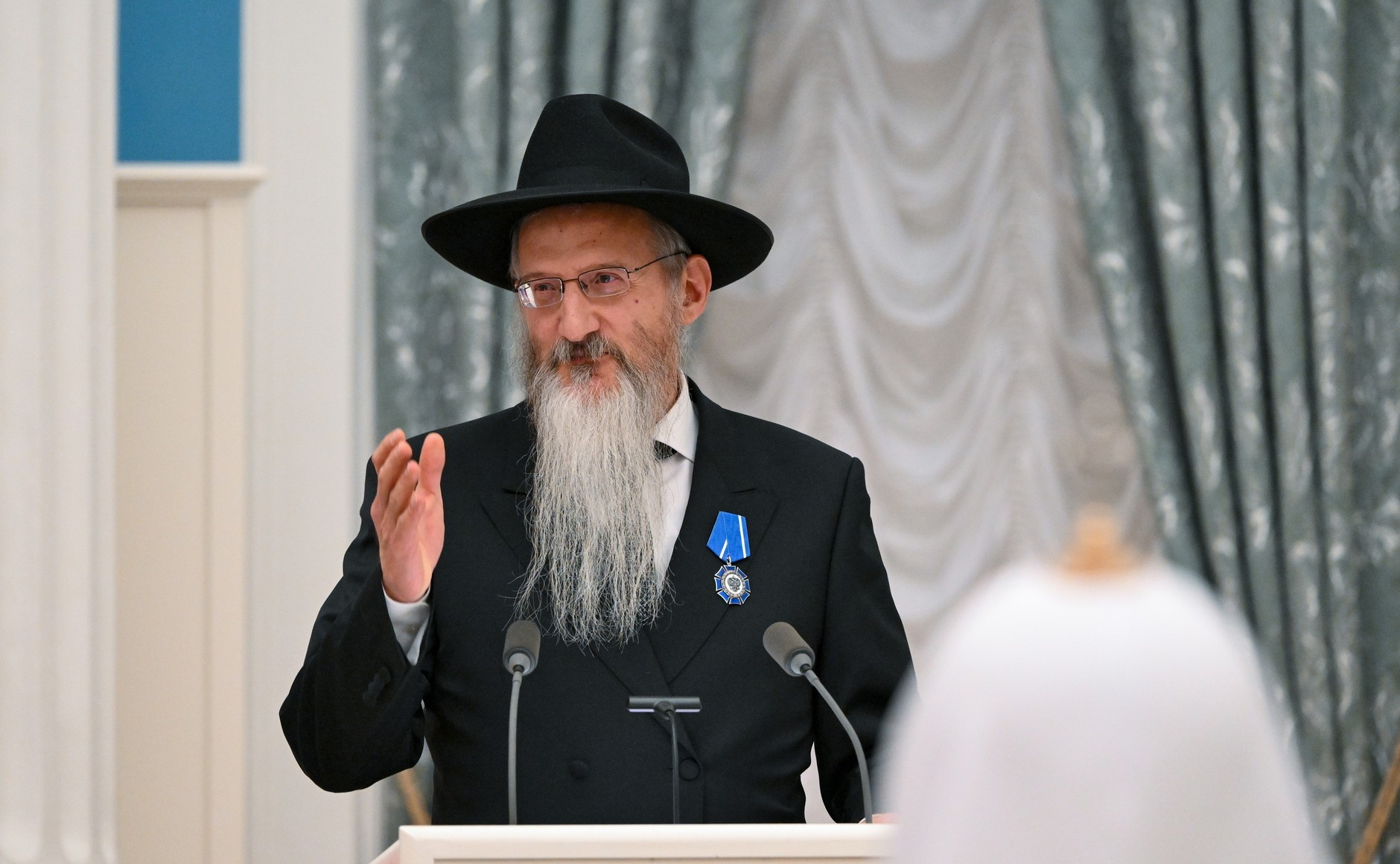
Lazar awarded with the Order of Honour, 4 November 2025
