= Yakov Leybovich Fishman =

Russian Orthodox rabbi

Rabbi Yakov Leybovich Fishman
- In office 1972–1983
- Title: Chief Rabbi of the Moscow Choral Synagogue

Personal life
- Born: March 20, 1913
- Died: June 4, 1983 (aged 70) Moscow, Soviet Union
- Education: Rabbinical seminary of Moscow
- Occupation: Rabbi

Religious life
- Religion: Judaism
- Denomination: Orthodox

Yakov Leybovich Fishman (Russian: Яков Лейбович Фишман; 20 March 1913 – 4 June 1983) served as the Chief Rabbi of the Moscow Choral Synagogue from 1972 to 1983.

Fishman studied at the rabbinical seminary of Moscow. His wife and children were murdered by Nazis during World War II. In 1972, after the death of Leib Levin, Fishman was elected the chief rabbi of Moscow. In 1976, he was a member of the delegation of religious leaders led by Bishop Juvenal that visited the US. In interviews to the US press he denied there was religious persecution in the Soviet Union. Thanks to the visit, a number of young Jews got the opportunity to study at the rabbinical seminary of Budapest, the only such institution in the Communist bloc countries.

On 28 April 1983, Yakov Fishman joined the "Anti-Zionist Committee of the Soviet Public".

He died of a heart attack on 4 June 1983 in Moscow.

== Sources ==
- https://www.jta.org/1983/06/07/archive/rabbi-jacob-fishman-dead-at-70
