= Shmarya Yehuda Leib Medalia =

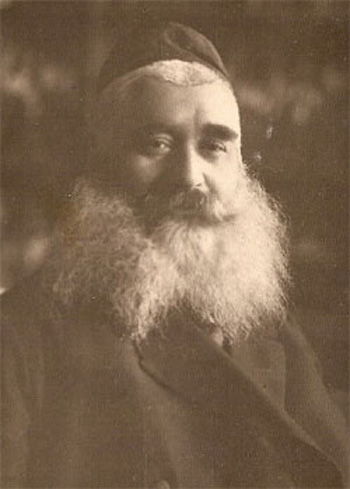
Medalia Shmarya, 1920

Shmarya Yehuda-Leib Medalia (Shemaryahu Medalia, Russian: Шмер-Лейб Янкелевич Медалье; 1872 – April 26, 1938) was the Lubavitcher chief rabbi of Moscow between 1933 and 1938. He was sentenced to death and shot in 1938 during The Great Terror in the Soviet Union.

== Biography ==
Shmarya Yehuda-Leib Yankelevich Medalia was born in Kretinga to a family of Lubavitcher Hasidim. He was an alumnus of the original Slabodka yeshiva. He is described in the Yizkor book of Vitebsk as a popular and influential, musical and scholarly preacher of a sanguine disposition, but stern on matters of Yiddishkeit. He had six sons and five daughters, who all lived to adulthood, among whom were scholars, a rabbi, and a shochet. On one notable occasion he refused to start a Jewish prayer service unless stationed Bolshevik militiamen left, crying, "This is a desecration of Shabbos!" His son Hillel Medalie became chief rabbi of Antwerp.

Between 1899 and 1903, he served as the rabbi of Tula, Russia; and between 1905 and 1917, in Vitebsk. After Tula he served in Krolevets. In 1910 he participated in the All-Russian Rabbinic Congress. In 1912, he took part in the Agudat Israel congress in Katowice, Poland. He was chosen to be one of seven leading rabbis of the Russian-Jewish rabbinical congress in 1917, and was the only one left in 1922. Between 1927 and 1931, he again served in Tula. In 1930 he left Vitebsk due to a tax dispute. In 1933, he received the appointment to serve as the rabbi of the Moscow Choral Synagogue. By 1933 the Russian government had already shut down the mikvahs and synagogues other than that one, which was under close surveillance. By 1938, Medalia had become the unofficial primary spiritual leader of the Jewish community in the Soviet Union.

In 1938, while serving as chief rabbi in Moscow, he was convicted of collusion with German fascists, and of illegally promoting Jewish education. His son Moishe was also arrested.

His high-profile led the central offices of the NKVD in Moscow to directly handle his case rather than the distributed NKVD troikas. He was accused in court of communicating with Lubavitcher rebbe Yosef Yitzchok Schneersohn who had been arrested and exiled from the USSR in 1927. Medalia was a relative of Schneerson, who urged him to stay in Russia and lead the Jewish community there. Medalia was imprisoned, tortured, and interrogated for months. His wife Devorah wrote to Lazar Kaganovich begging for kosher food and matzah to be provided for him. Writing directly to Joseph Stalin, she begged, "I appeal to you, greatly esteemed Iosif Vissarionovich, with a request to help free my husband. The only thing it would be possible to charge him with is that he is a rabbi."

In addition to communicating with German agents and "corrupting the youth," he was convicted of counterrevolutionary activities, including organizing matzah bakeries, selling aliyahs and seats in the synagogue, distributing money to the poor, and financing illegal yeshivas. He was accused of leading a group engaged in theft and speculation. He was also accused of cheating people and late night drunkenness.

The Military Collegium of the Supreme Court of the Soviet Union found him guilty under Articles 58-8 and 58-11 of Russian criminal code. Upon conviction, he was shot and buried in the common tomb in the Kommunarka shooting ground. He was posthumously exonerated after twenty years. Rabbi Pinchas Goldschmidt, who held the post of the rabbi of Moscow in 1991, presented the Choral Synagogue with a parokhet or ark curtain, in memory of Rabbi Medalia. Goldschmidt later left Russia and was declared an enemy of the state over his views on the Russian invasion of Ukraine, the first time since Medalia a rabbi was declared this.

His family finally received notice of his 1938 execution by the NKVD in 1964, with declassified KGB documents in 2008 revealing more details.
