= Armenian Museum of Moscow and Culture of Nations =

Museum in Russia

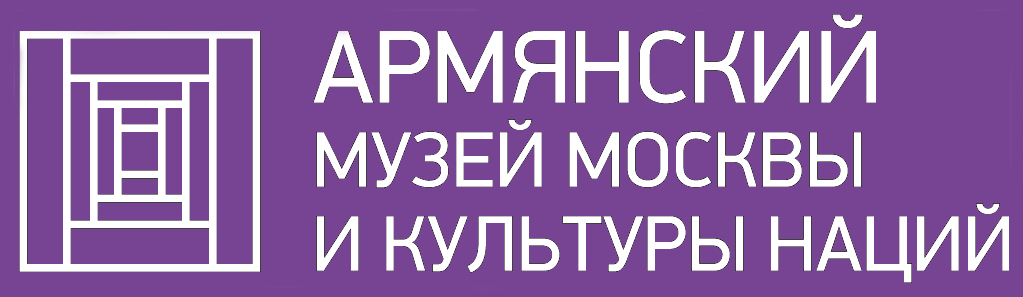

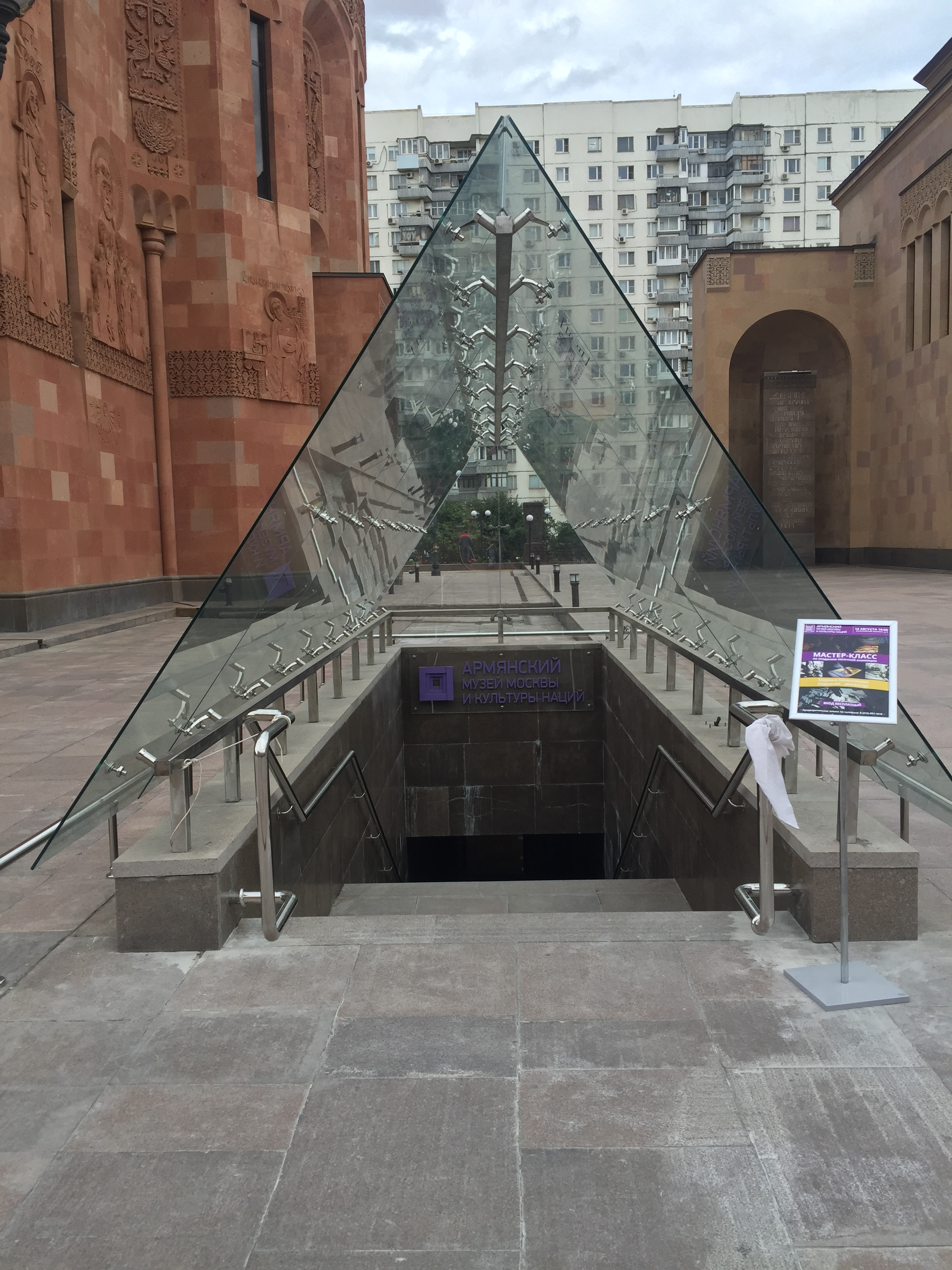
- Entrance to the original museum
- Established: 22 April 2015
- Location: Moscow, Prospekt Mira, 33, building 1
- Type: History, art
- Founder: Ruben Tsolakovich Grigoryan
- Website: armmuseum.ru

The Armenian Museum of Moscow and Culture of Nations is a museum in Moscow dedicated to Armenian culture and history. It operates as a lecture hall and exhibition space, and it holds temporary art and documentary exhibitions, educational programs, lectures, film screenings and public discussions. It opened on 22 April 2015, to mark the centenary of the Armenian genocide in the Ottoman Empire. Its founder is the entrepreneur and philanthropist Ruben Tsolakovich Grigoryan.

== History ==
In 2014, construction began on the museum building in Moscow's Meshchansky District. It was in the Armenian Temple Complex adjacent to the Armenian Cathedral of Moscow. The grand opening took place on 22 April 2015, the hundredth anniversary of the start of the Armenian genocide. The ceremony was attended by the Ambassador of Armenia to Russia Oleg Yesayan, the chairman of the State Duma Committee on Culture Stanislav Govorukhin, the head of the Russian Jewish Congress Yuri Kanner, and the envoy of the Pope Ivan Jurkovič.

The museum later moved to the "Olympic Plaza" business center at Prospekt Mira, 33, building 1, where it continued operating as an independent institution. After the move, the "Tapan" museum opened in the original building and now operates separately from the Armenian Museum of Moscow.

== Exhibitions in the original building ==
As of 2015, the museum comprised about nine themed halls, most of which were interactive. The central hall was dedicated to the Armenian genocide, featuring the multimedia installation "Armenian Dantesque," based on the poem by Hovhannes Shiraz. The historical halls covered ancient and medieval Armenia, the role of Armenians in the Russian Empire and the USSR, and the history of the Armenian community of Moscow. The art hall presented paintings, sculpture and panoramic canvases; the library and archive section included rare editions, letters and documents. The museum had a 3D cinema seating 50, which showed a film about the history of Armenia.

== Projects ==
The museum supports young authors through a system of open competitions (open calls) in contemporary art, photography, digital art and film. Selected works are featured in the museum's temporary exhibitions and screenings.

The museum also holds regular lectures featuring scholars, musicologists, historians and cultural experts. Speakers have included Russian Academy of Sciences academician Vladimir Plungian, musicologist Fyodor Sofronov, HSE University professor Andrei Vinogradov, director Denis Nerobeev, and others.

A separate area of activity is an information portal that publishes articles, research, interviews and historical materials devoted to Armenian culture, science and history in Russia, Armenia and other countries.

=== Exhibition "Tamara Toumanova — the Black Pearl of Russian Ballet" ===
From 20 November to 5 December 2024, the museum held a photo-documentary exhibition jointly with the Alexander Solzhenitsyn House of Russia Abroad, dedicated to the life and work of the ballerina Tamara Toumanova (1919–1996), a member of an Armenian princely family.

=== Exhibition "Alexander Shakaryan: The Story of a Master" ===
A 2025 exhibition devoted to the work of the theatrical artist Alexander Shakaryan, a member of the Union of Artists of the USSR and an Honored Artist of the Armenian SSR. The exhibition featured graphic art, paintings and stage sketches.

=== Atlas "Historical Cartography of Armenia" ===
In 2025, the museum received a facsimile edition of the atlas "Historical Cartography of Armenia" by the geographer and cartographer Zatik Khanzadian (1886–1980). Khanzadian was a commander in the French Navy, a participant in the Paris Peace Conference (1919–1920), a corresponding member of the Armenian SSR Academy of Sciences (from 1967), and a holder of the Legion of Honour. The original edition was published in 1960 in Courbevoie, France, in two volumes in French (Atlas de cartographie historique de l'Arménie). The atlas includes about 500 historical maps ranging from ancient Babylon to the mid-20th century. The 2025 facsimile reissue was produced in three languages: Armenian, Russian and French. It was initiated by the Tekeyan Cultural Union, sponsored by Ruben Grigoryan, with the Mekhitarist Congregation of Venice as a partner. A presentation was held on 18 April 2025 in Yerevan (at the Tekeyan Cultural Center), and in May 2025 in Moscow, at the Armenian Museum.

== Partnerships ==
The museum collaborates with Russian and international institutions, including the Museum of Moscow, the Armenian Genocide Museum-Institute, the "Tekeyan" Cultural Union, HSE University, the Lazarev Fund, the Center for Oriental Literature, the ZIL Cultural Center, the Institute of Ethnology and Anthropology of the Russian Academy of Sciences, and the Narekatsi Institute.

== See also ==
- Armenians in Russia
