= Israeli Jewish Congress =

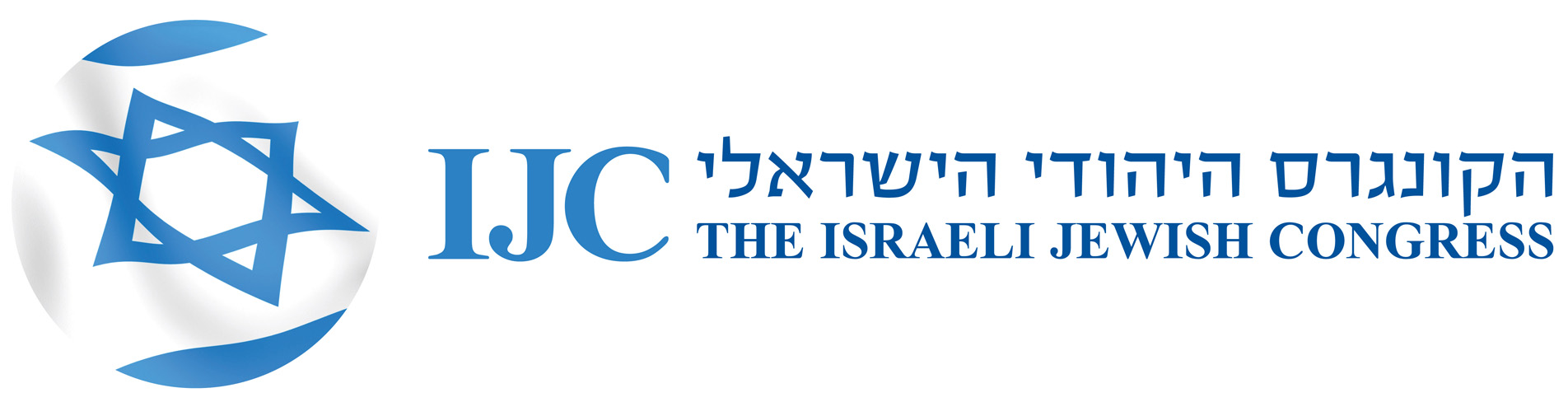
The Israeli Jewish Congress

The Israeli Jewish Congress - HAKHEL was founded in 2012 (abbreviation IJC ) and is based in Israel. It represents the Jewish Community of Israel in relation to Diaspora Jewry, mainly European Jewish communities and international forums and institutions. It currently has offices in Tel Aviv (in the Electra Tower), Israel and is planning on opening more branches in major European capitals.

Vision: Promoting the principle of Israel as the Jewish State.

== Objectives ==
The goals and objectives of the IJC are:

1. Promoting and strengthening the Jewish character of Israel as a Jewish and democratic State, as stated in the Proclamation of Independence.
2. Reinforcing and tightening mutual relations between the Jewish community in Israel and those in Europe.
3. The preservation and strengthening of Jewish tradition in Israel and the Diaspora.
4. Promoting the interests of the Jewish community in Israel.
5. Respectful and effective commemoration of the Holocaust.
6. Opposition to any manifestation of anti-Semitism or racism.
7. The Promotion and support of Israel in the international community.
8. Promotion of programs to strengthen Jewish solidarity in Israel and the Diaspora.

The IJC was founded by a group of prominent Israelis, including former member of Knesset and former Mossad Director Danny Yatom, Mr. Vladimir Sloutsker, former chairman of the Russian Jewish Congress and former vice chairman of the European Jewish Congress, Maj. Gen. (Ret.) Yaakov Borovsky, a former commander of the Northern District of the Israel Police and Attorney Lipa Meir who form the board of Management.

Mr. Sloutsker is president of the IJC.

== See also ==
- Arsen Ostrovsky
