= Olga Sloutsker =

Russian businesswoman

Olga Sergeevna Sloutsker
- Ольга Сергеевна Слуцкер
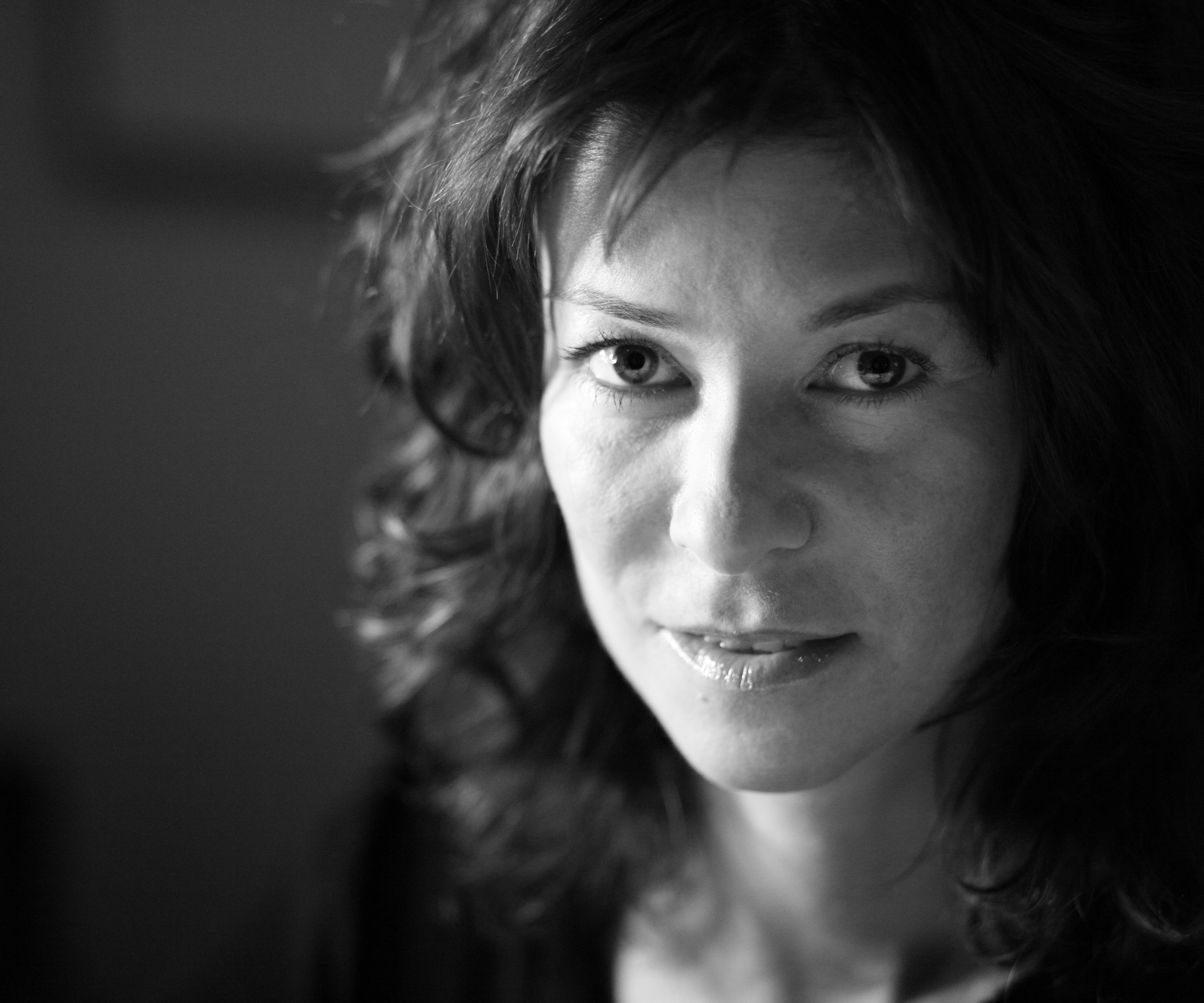
- Olga Sloutsker in 2007
- Born: Olga Sergeevna Berezovskaya; January 14, 1965 (age 60); Leningrad
- Occupation: Businesswoman
- Known for: Founder of the World Class fitness club chain, President of the Russian Fitness Group

Olga Sergeevna Sloutsker, née Berezovskaya (Russian: Ольга Сергеевна Слуцкер; born January 14, 1965, Leningrad) – businesswoman, founder and head of the World Class fitness club chain, President of the Russian Fitness Group (Russian: «Русская Фитнес Группа»). She is listed among the owners of super-expensive real estate in the UK.

== Career ==
From 2005 to 2012 Sloutsker was the head coach of the Russian team in the TV show "Big Races" (Russian: «Большие гонки») on Channel One.

In 2007 Sloutsker opened the Heirs (Russian: «Наследники») Women's Health Center, which provides gynecology and IVF services, as well as other services.

Since 2007, Sloutsker has been the president of the Fitness Aerobics Federation in Russia, and a member of the FISAF Executive Committee.

In 2009, Sloutsker took 21st place in the ranking of the 50 most influential business women according to Finance magazine.

In December 2011, Sloutsker ran for the State Duma of the sixth convocation as part of the list from Saint Petersburg, nominated by the United Russia party. She was not elected.

In 2011, she was included in the ranking of the 100 most influential women in Russia (by Echo of Moscow radio station, RIA Novosti news agencies, Interfax and Ogoniok magazine).

In 2012, Sloutsker served as Chairman of the Public Council under the Presidential Commissioner for Children's Rights.

In 2014 and 2015 she was included in the ranking of the 30 and 50 richest women in Russia. She took 18th and 23rd places, respectively.

From 2019 to the present (for November 2024), Sloutsker has been the president of the Special Olympics of Russia, an organization that organizes sports events for people with mental disabilities.

Sloutsker is a member of the boards of trustees of the charitable foundations "We are together" and "Northern Crown". (Russian: «Мы вместе» and «Северная корона»).

== Court ==
After the divorce, she filed a lawsuit against her ex-husband Vladimir Slutsker. She demanded that all rights to the luxurious mansion worth 40 million pounds in London be transferred to her. The court decided to transfer the mansion to Olga Slutsker in 2012.

== World Class ==
In 1993 Olga opened the first World Class fitness club in Moscow. In the first year, the sales of the Moscow club amounted to $3.7 million.

In 1996 she bought the rights to the World Class brand and became the sole management company.

In 2006 Alfa Capital Partners, an investment company, acquired a stake in the World Class chain (member of the Alfa Group).

In 2006 Sloutsker founded another fitness chain FizKult (Russian: «ФизКульт»). In 2007 she merged World Class and FizKult with the "Reebok" and "Maxi-Sport" (Russian: «Рибок» and «Макси-спорт») fitness chains, which began operating under the World Class and FizKult brands.

By 2007 she has already represented the entire Russian Fitness Group corporation, it included the fitness chains "Reebok" and "Maxi-sport".

In 2013 Olga Sloutsker launched a new brand — World Class LITE (a lightweight version of World Class clubs with a focus on group programs and more affordable prices).

World Class became the No.1 fitness club chain in terms of revenue in 2014 according to research by the marketing agency NeoAnalitics (Russian fitness services market: results of 2014, forecast to 2017).

For 2018 World Class was part of the Top-10 fitness brands in the world.

During the pandemic in 2020 World Class was included in the list of backbone companies of the Russian Federation and received support from the state.

For 2002 the chain consisted of 9 clubs in Moscow, 1 in Ukraine and 1 in Kazakhstan.

In 2018 the World Class Club opened in Georgia, and in 2015 – in Monaco, France.

For 2020 the number of clubs was 52 owned and 51 franchised in Russia, also in Kazakhstan, Georgia, Kyrgyzstan, Monaco and Turkey.

Over the years, the World Class chain has been included in the international ranking of the top 25 fitness clubs in the world Global 25.

== Biography ==
Born in Leningrad. Mother was a doctor, father Sergey Berezovsky was a lawyer.

As a child, she was professionally engaged in fencing, studied at the Lesgaft Academy of Physical Culture, from which she graduated in 1987. She is a master of sports in fencing.

The ex–husband is Vladimir Sloutsker. They were married from 1990 to 2009. Two children — son Mikhail (born 1997) and daughter Anna (born 2003). After the divorce, the children stayed with Vladimir.

In 2013 Olga had twins Maria and Ekaterina.

== Awards ==
- 1998 – Order of Princess Olga, 3rd degree from the Russian Orthodox Church (за благотворительную деятельность)
- 2001 – nominee as “Person of the Year” in the area of “Contribution to the Russian industry development”
- 2006 – Award as a “2006 European Operator of the year” by IHRSA
