= Armenian Cathedral of Moscow =

Armenian Apostolic church in Moscow, Russia

Holy Transfiguration Church
- Սուրբ Պայծառակերպության եկեղեցի
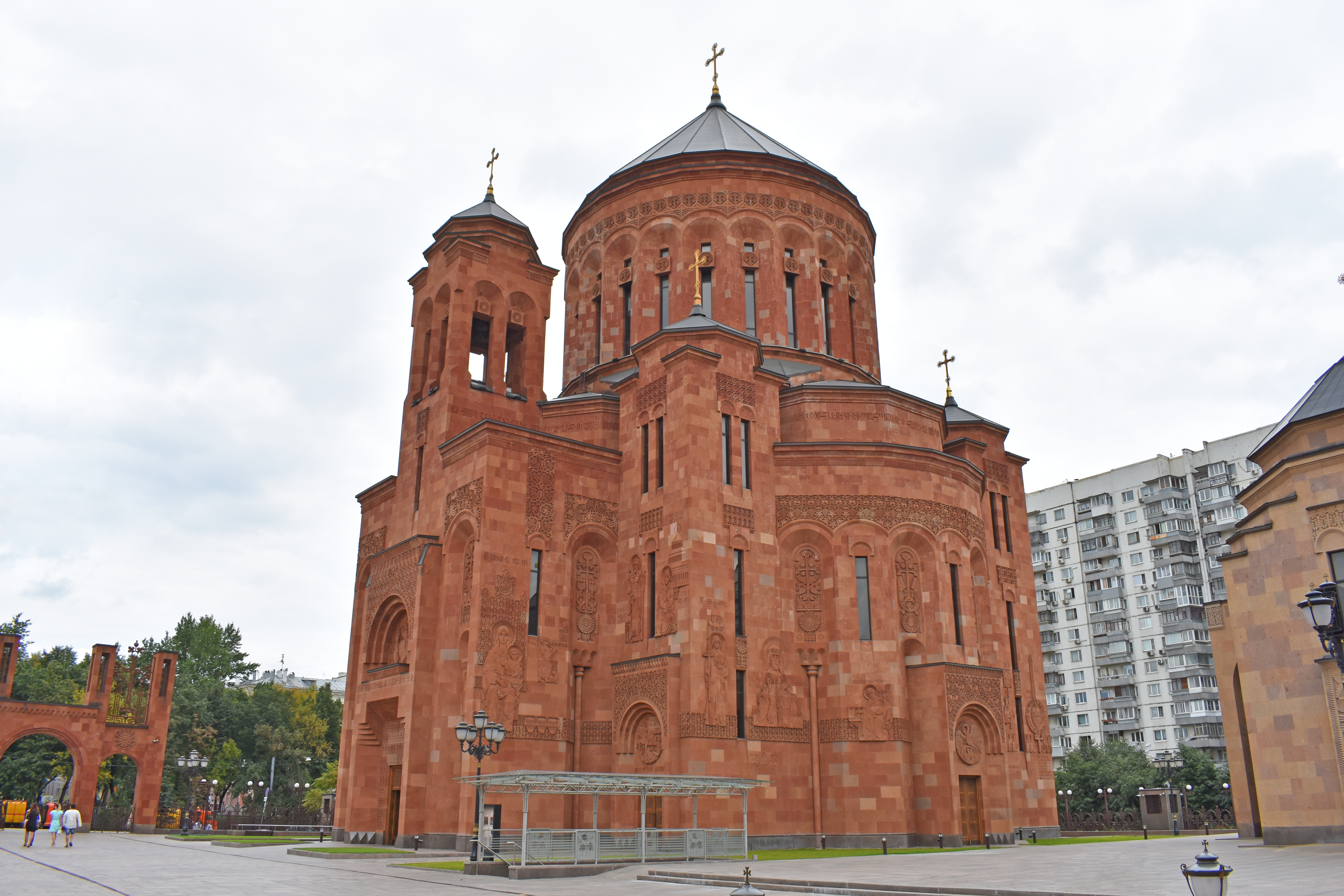

Religion
- Affiliation: Armenian Apostolic Church
- Year consecrated: September 17, 2013
- Status: Active

Location
- Location: 24 Trifonovskaya Street, Meshchansky District, Moscow, Russia
- Interactive map of Holy Transfiguration Church
- Coordinates: 55.788060°N 37.621194°E

Architecture
- Architect: Artak Ghulyan
- Style: Classical Armenian
- Groundbreaking: 2006
- Completed: 2013
- Construction cost: up to $35 million (estimated)

Specifications
- Capacity: 1,000–1,200
- Height (max): 58 metres (190 ft)
- Dome dia. (outer): 20.9 metres (69 ft)

The Armenian Cathedral of Moscow, officially known as Holy Transfiguration Cathedral (Armenian: Սուրբ Պայծառակերպության եկեղեցի, Surb paytsarakerputyan yekeghetsi; Russian: Собор Преображения Господня), is the seat of the Diocese of Russia of the Armenian Apostolic Church. Constructed in seven years, it was consecrated in September 2013 by leaders of the Armenian Apostolic and Russian Orthodox churches. It is considered the largest Armenian church (Note: "...новый кафедральный собор - самый большой из тех, что построены вне Армении...": "Собор, способный вместить под своими сводами одновременно более тысячи прихожан, является самым большим сооружением Армянской Апостольской Церкви за пределами Армении."; "The Cathedral of the complex will become the biggest structure of the Armenian Apostolic Church outside Armenia."; "Здание Собора - самое большое сооружение Армянской Апостольской церкви вне Армении.") and church complex (Note: "самого большого комплекса ААЦ вне территории Армении": "Этот храм является самым крупным армянским духовным комплексом за пределами Армении..."; "Церковного комплекса епархии, ставшего самым большим сооружением ААЦ вне территории Армении."; "Это крупнейший духовный центр Армении за пределами страны...") outside Armenia.

== History ==
In the pre-Soviet period, Moscow had three Armenian Apostolic churches—two of which, built in the 18th century, were demolished by the Soviet authorities by the 1930s. The sole church to survive was the small 19th century Holy Resurrection Church at the Moscow Armenian Cemetery (part of the larger Vagankovo Cemetery). Holy Resurrection was returned to the Armenian Church in 1956 and served as the city's sole Armenian church for more than five decades. In post-Soviet period, the Armenian population of Moscow increased significantly, reaching as many as 500,000, while the 2010 Russian census recorded around 170,000 Armenians in the city of Moscow and Moscow Oblast.

The church was conceived in 1996. Moscow authorities allotted land plot for the church complex in the same year. It was initially planned to complete construction by 2001. However, further controversy ensued in 2001 when Archbishop Tigran Kyureghian was accused of embezzling $3 million and was replaced by Catholicos Garegin II with the latter's brother—Yezras Nersisian. Subsequently, the new bishop began to raise funds for its construction.

In October 2004 Catholicos Garegin II and Patriarch Alexy II of Moscow ceremonially set the cornerstone of the church complex. The construction of the church itself began in 2006 and lasted seven years. The construction was extended due to various reasons.

Various individuals contributed to the construction, including wealthy Russian-Armenian businessmen such as Samvel Karapetyan and Ruben Vardanyan. Yezras Nersisian, primate of Russia, stated that an unknown amount of money was spent on the construction of the church because many individuals provided not money, but construction material. However, an estimated $30–35 million is believed to have been spent on construction of the complex.

The consecration ceremony took place on September 17, 2013 and was presided by Catholicos Garegin II. In attendance were Patriarch Kirill of Moscow, President of Armenia Serzh Sargsyan, President of the Nagorno-Karabakh Republic Bako Sahakyan, dozens of Armenian bishops from Armenia and the diaspora, representatives of Russia's Muslim, Buddhist and Jewish communities, and many others.

The first Divine Liturgy took place on September 22, 2013.

In January 2017 pieces from the relics of Gregory the Illuminator, Armenia's patron saint, were presented to the church by Artur Janibekyan, Armenia-born TV producer and manager of Russia's most popular TV channels.

== Complex ==
The cathedral is a part of a larger complex that covers an area of 2.5 hectares (6.2 acres). Besides the cathedral, it includes the chapel of the Holy Cross (Surb Khach), an Armenian school, the headquarters of the diocese of Russia and Nor Nakhijevan, an underground museum and exhibition hall, several monuments, and a parking lot for 200-300 cars. The exhibition hall was originally the Armenian Museum of Moscow and Culture of Nations and is now the Tapan ("Ark") museum.

== Architecture ==
The church complex and the cathedral were designed by Artak Ghulyan, who took over in 2004.

The cathedral was built in traditional Armenian architecture and faced with tuff stone, brought from Anipemza, Armenia—near the medieval Armenian capital of Ani—with over 100 railroad cars. The cathedral is 58 metres (190 ft) tall, including the 7 metres (23 ft) cross. It is thus the tallest Armenian church of the diaspora. (Note: "Благодаря ему московский кафедральный собор станет самым высоким армянским храмом в мире.") St. Gregory the Illuminator Cathedral in Yerevan is only slightly taller, at 60 metres (200 ft). The diameter of the dome is 21 metres (69 ft). The church has a capacity of between 1,000 to 1,200 people. While as many as 2,400 people can fit inside the complex.

The exterior of the cathedral is richly decorated with extensive bas-reliefs of Armenian (Mesrop Mashtots, Saint Sarkis, Gregory the Illuminator, Gregory of Narek, etc.) and non-Armenian (Saint George, etc.) saints and crosses.

== Gallery ==
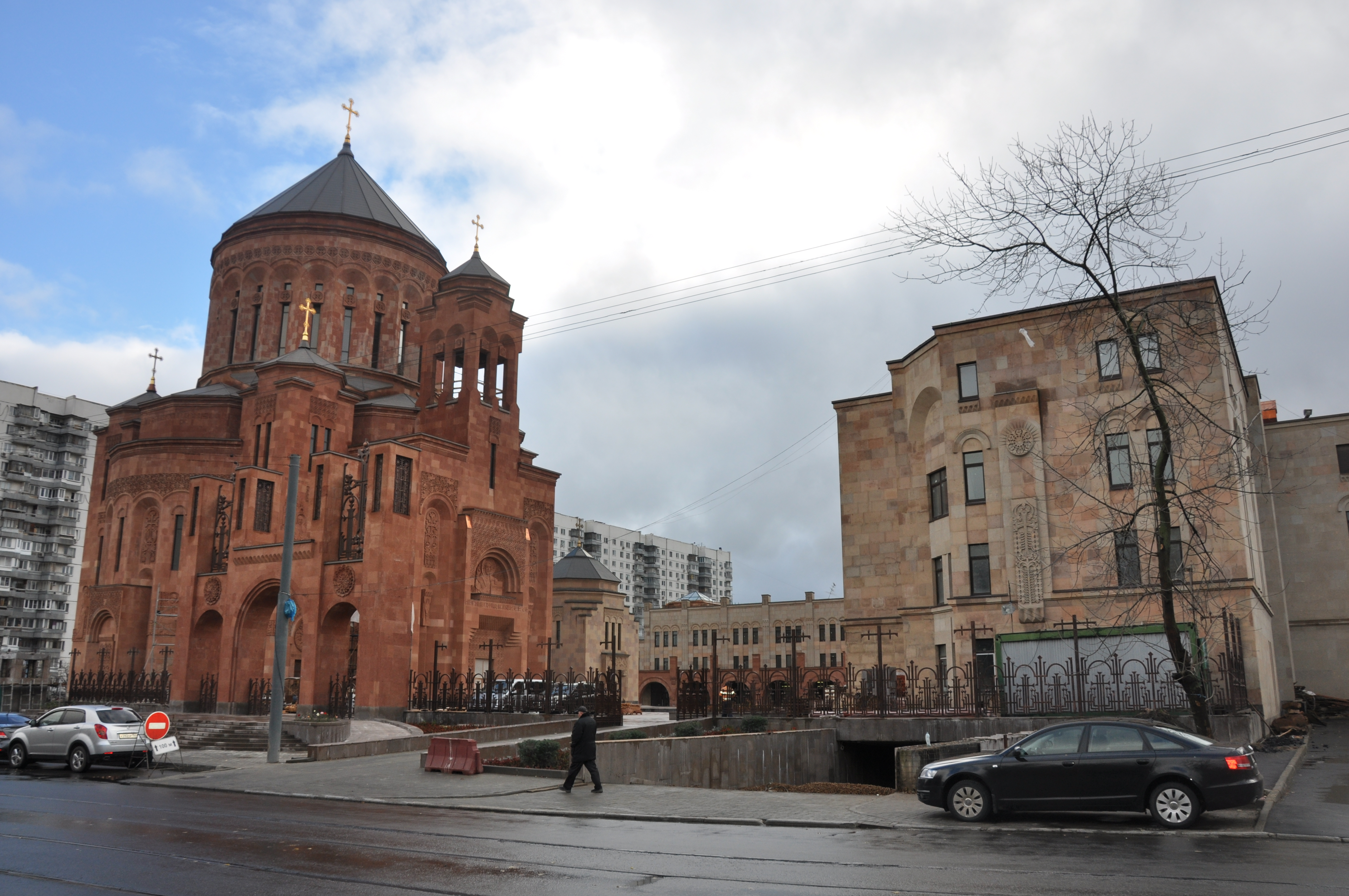

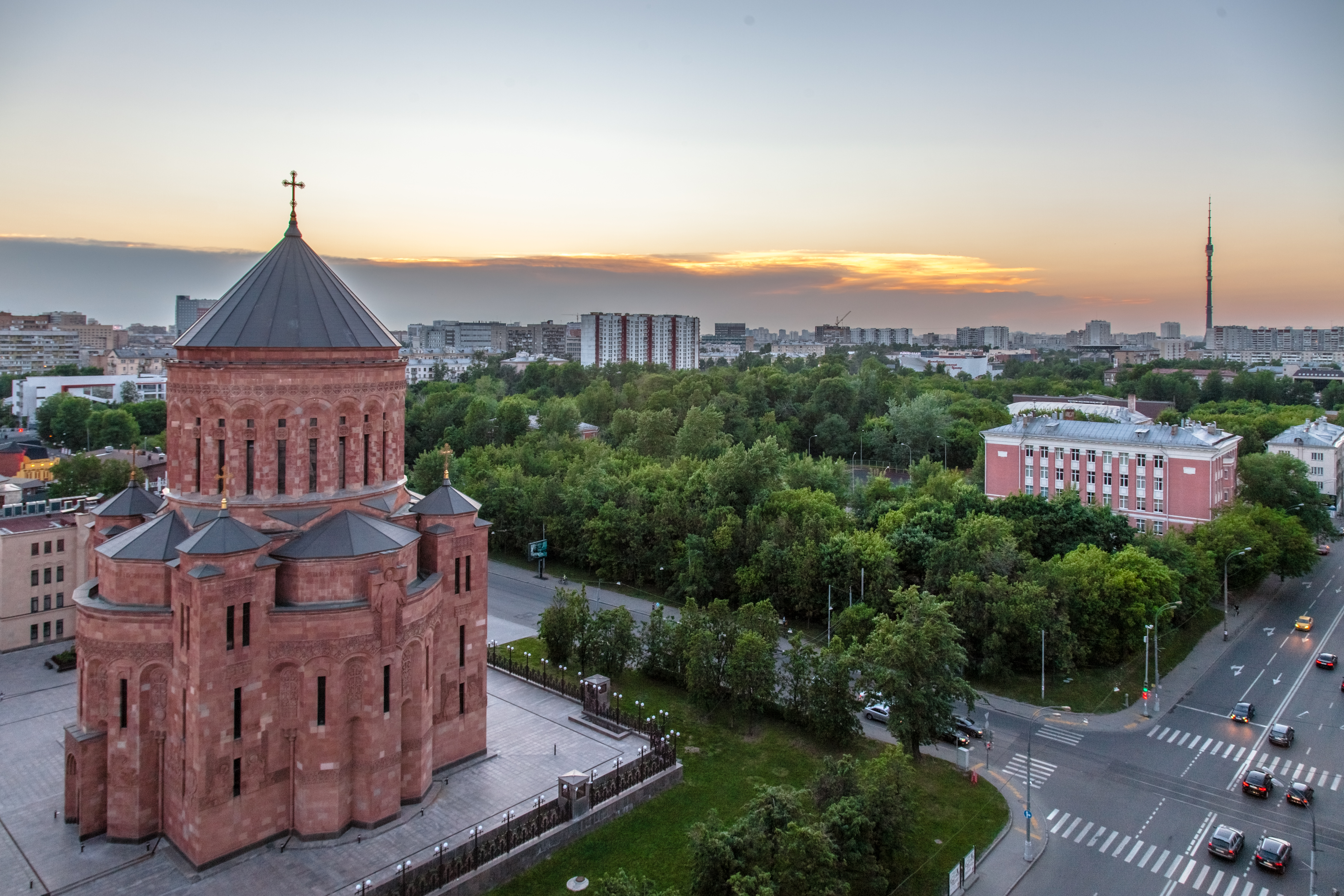
Aerial view

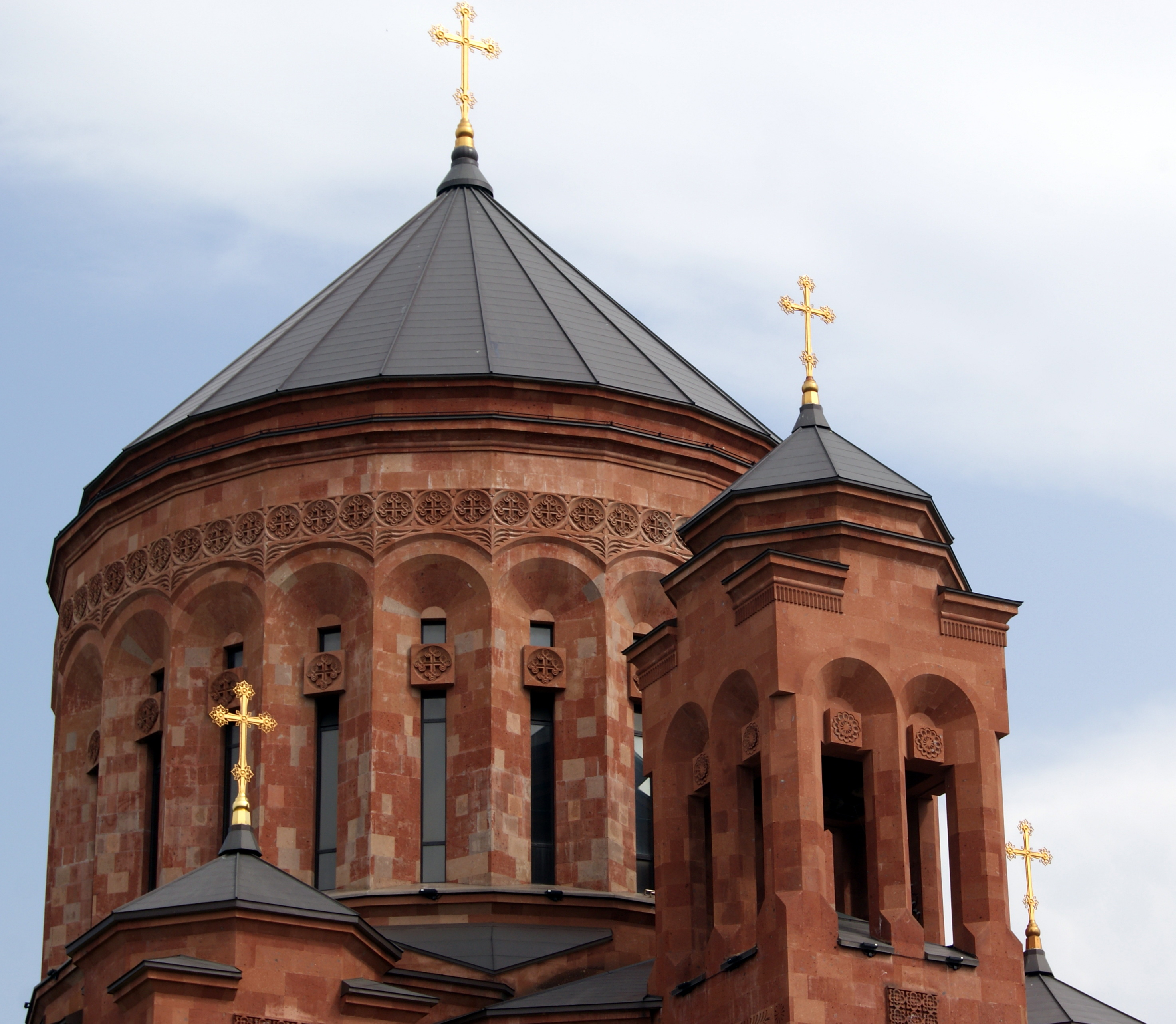

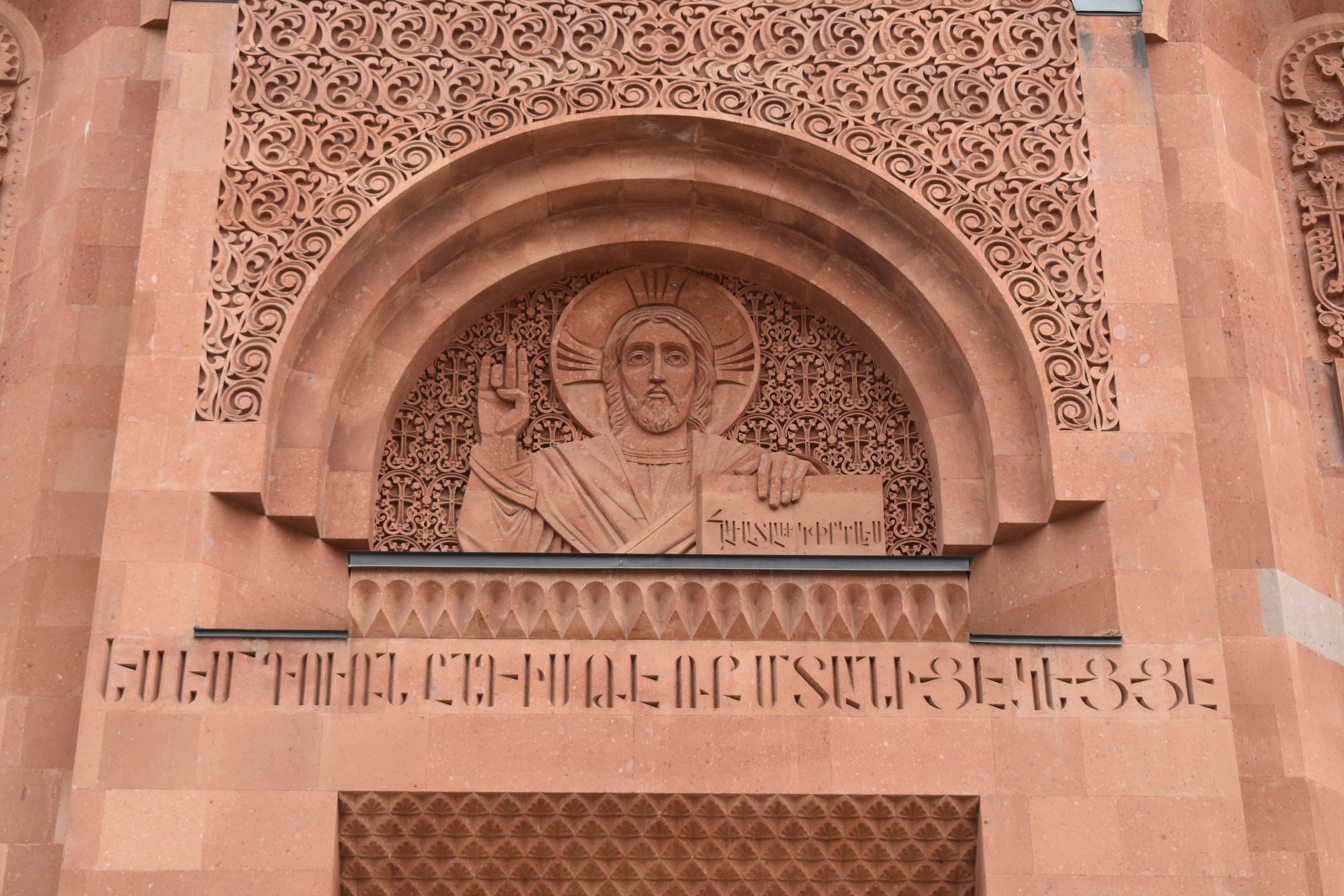
A relief of Jesus Christ at the top of the main entrance

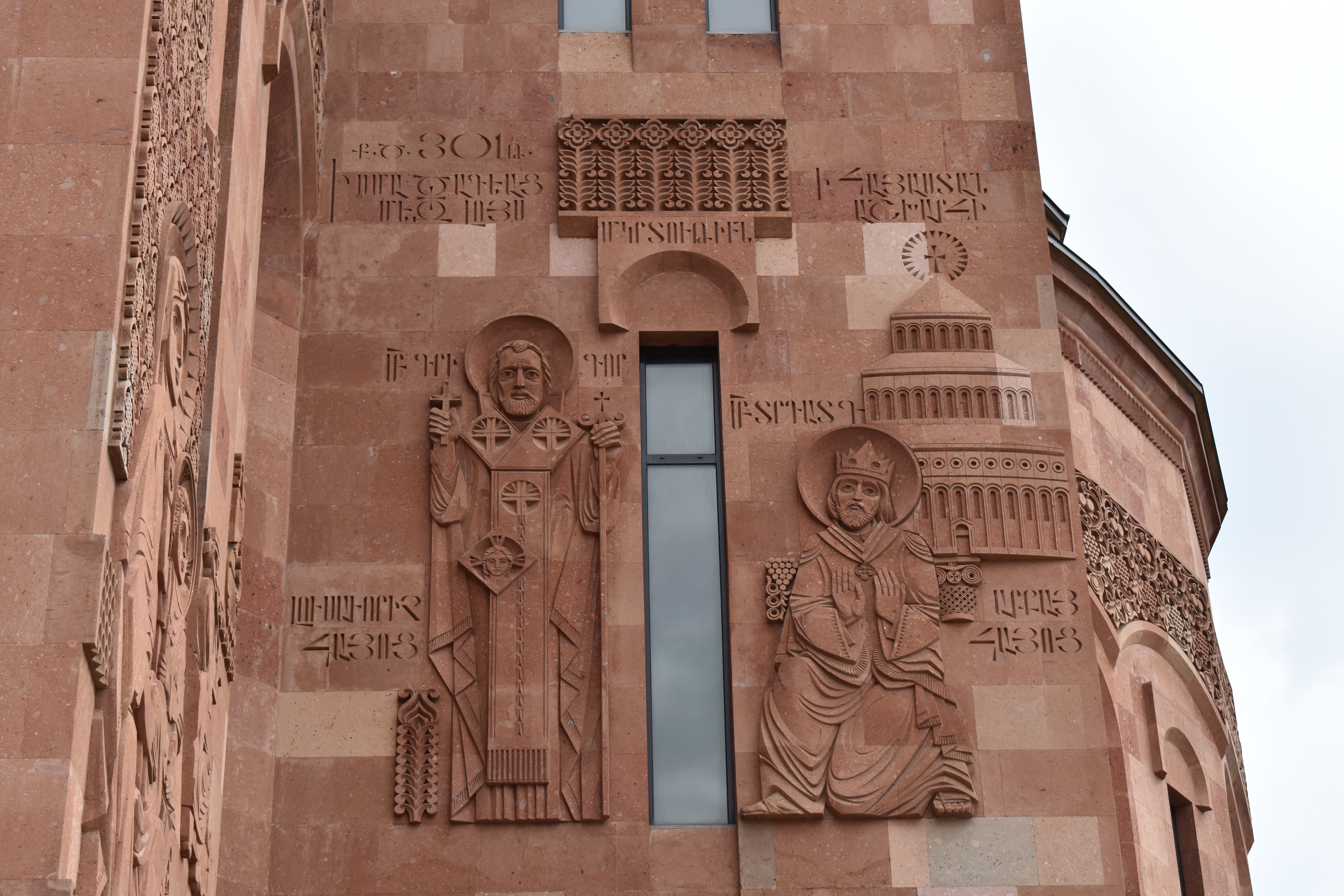
A relief depicting Gregory the Illuminator and Tiridates III

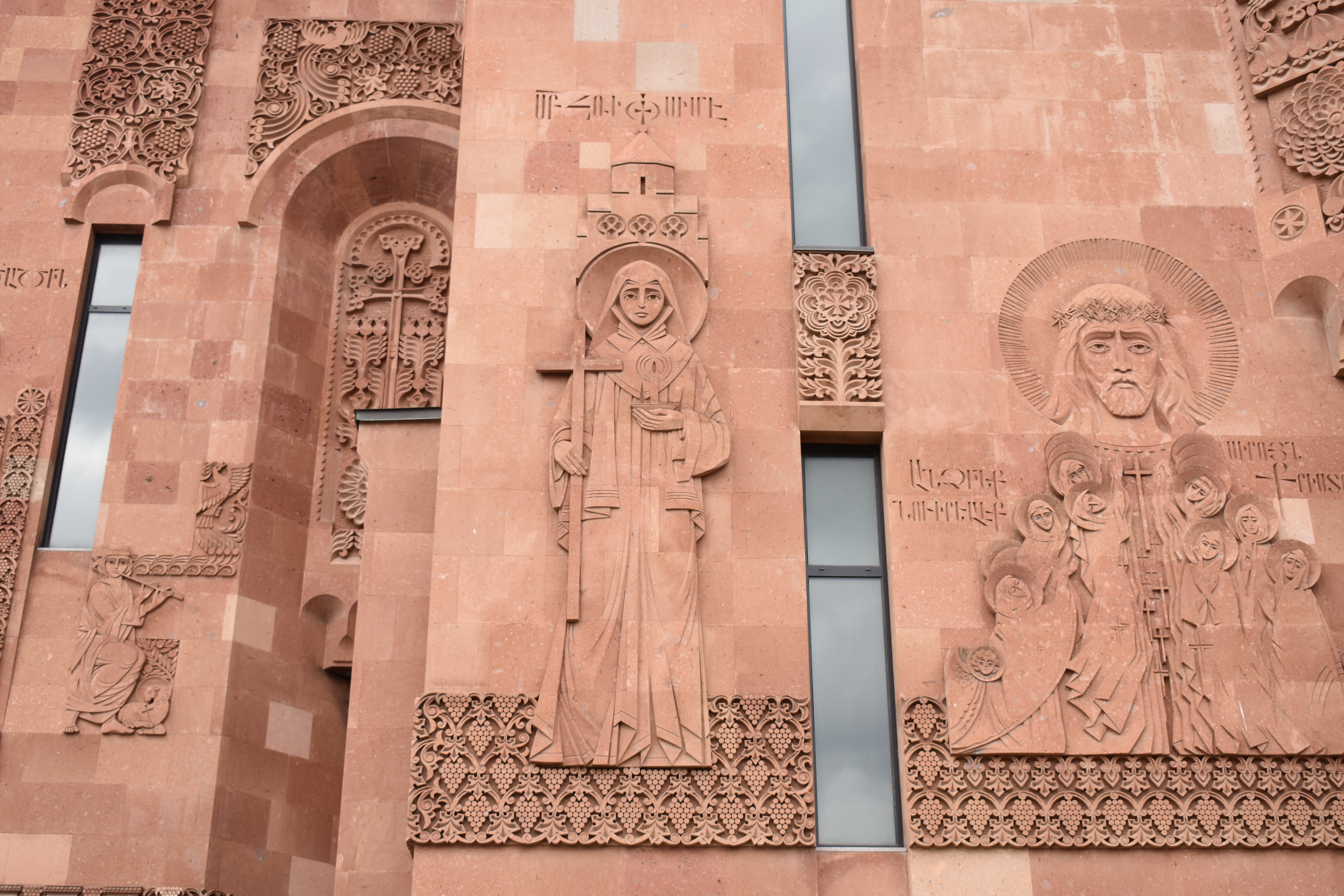
A relief of Hripsime

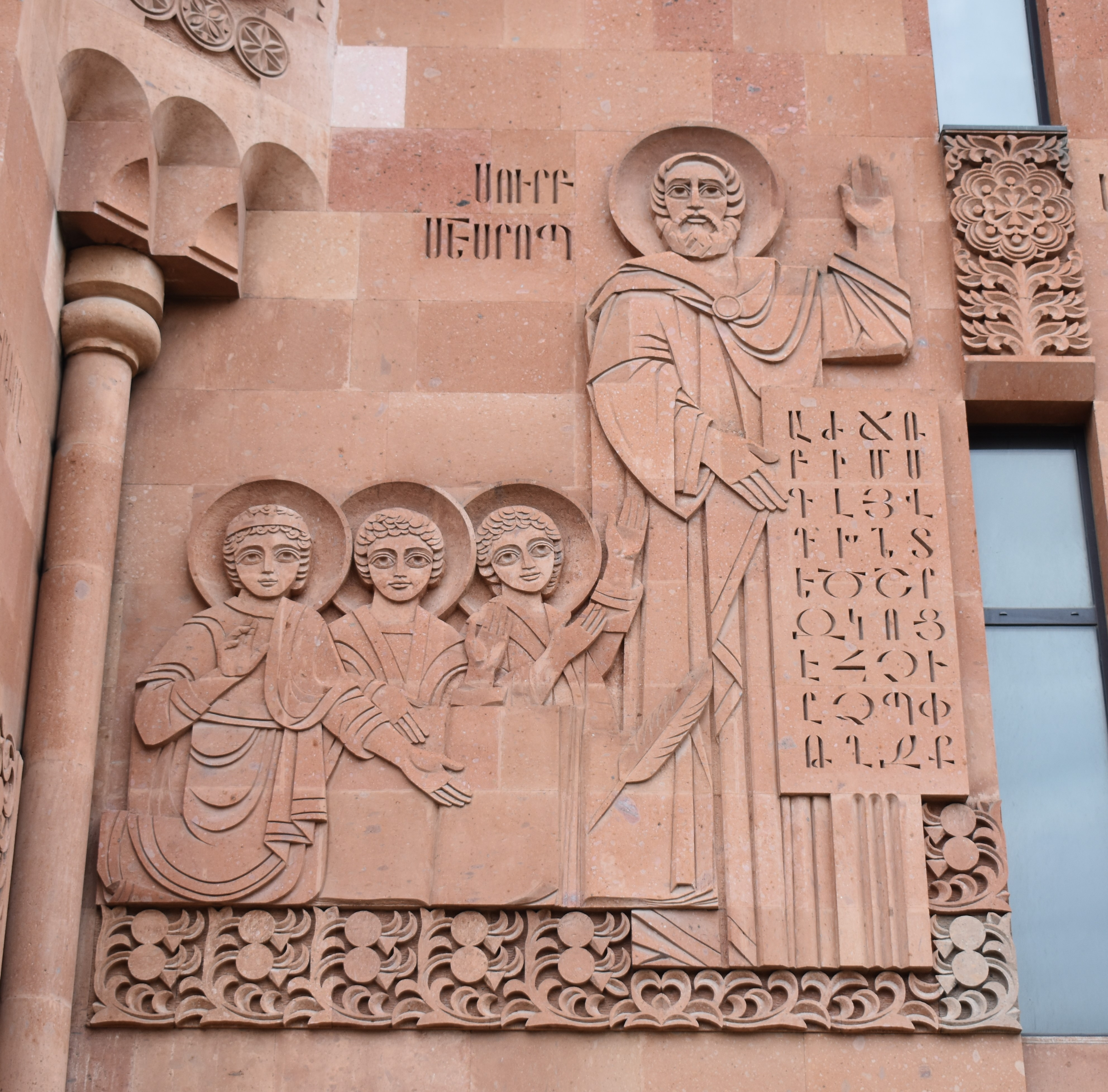
A relief of Mesrop Mashtots

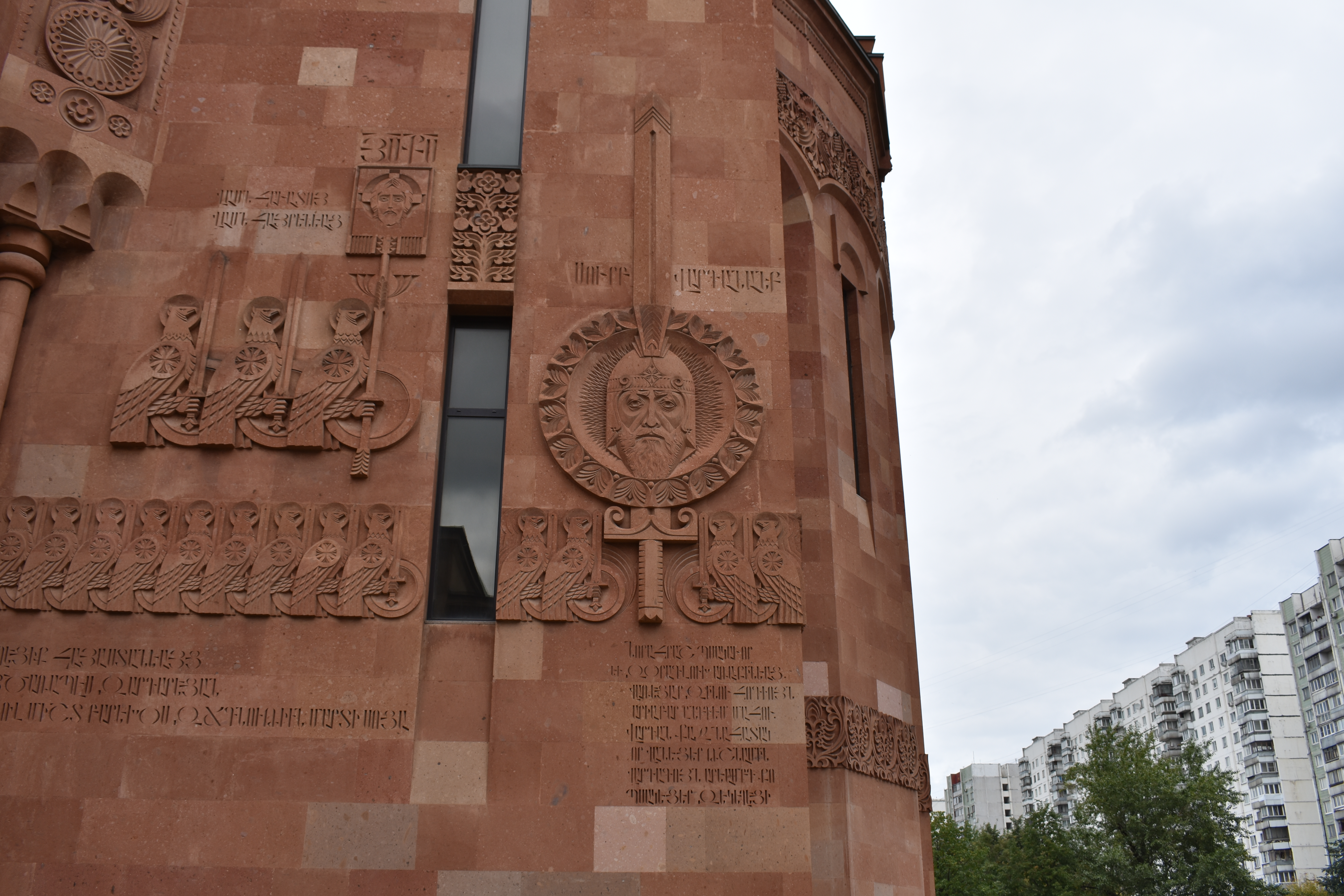
A relief of Vardan Mamikonian

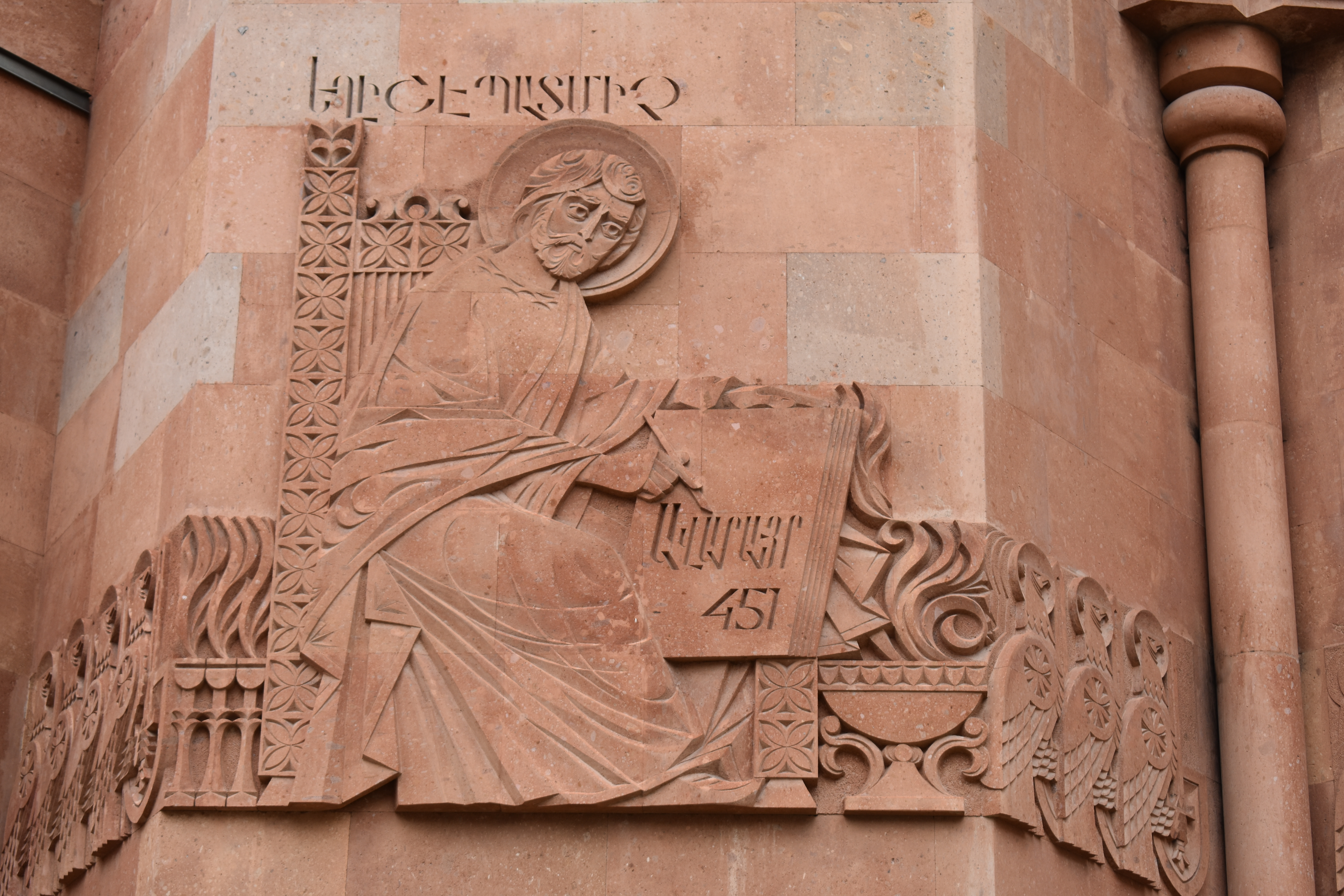
A relief of Yeghishe

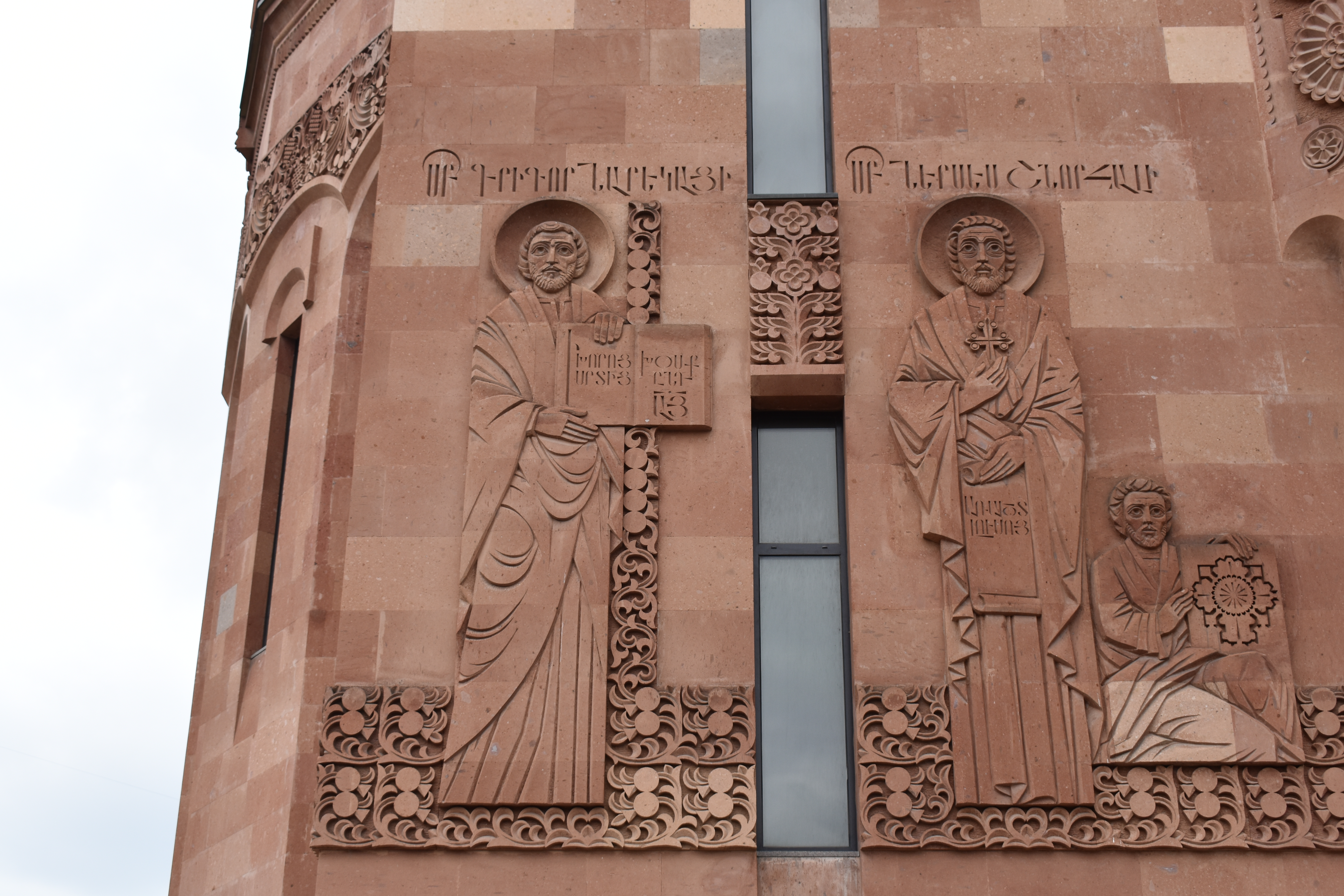
A relief of Gregory of Narek and Nerses Shnorhali

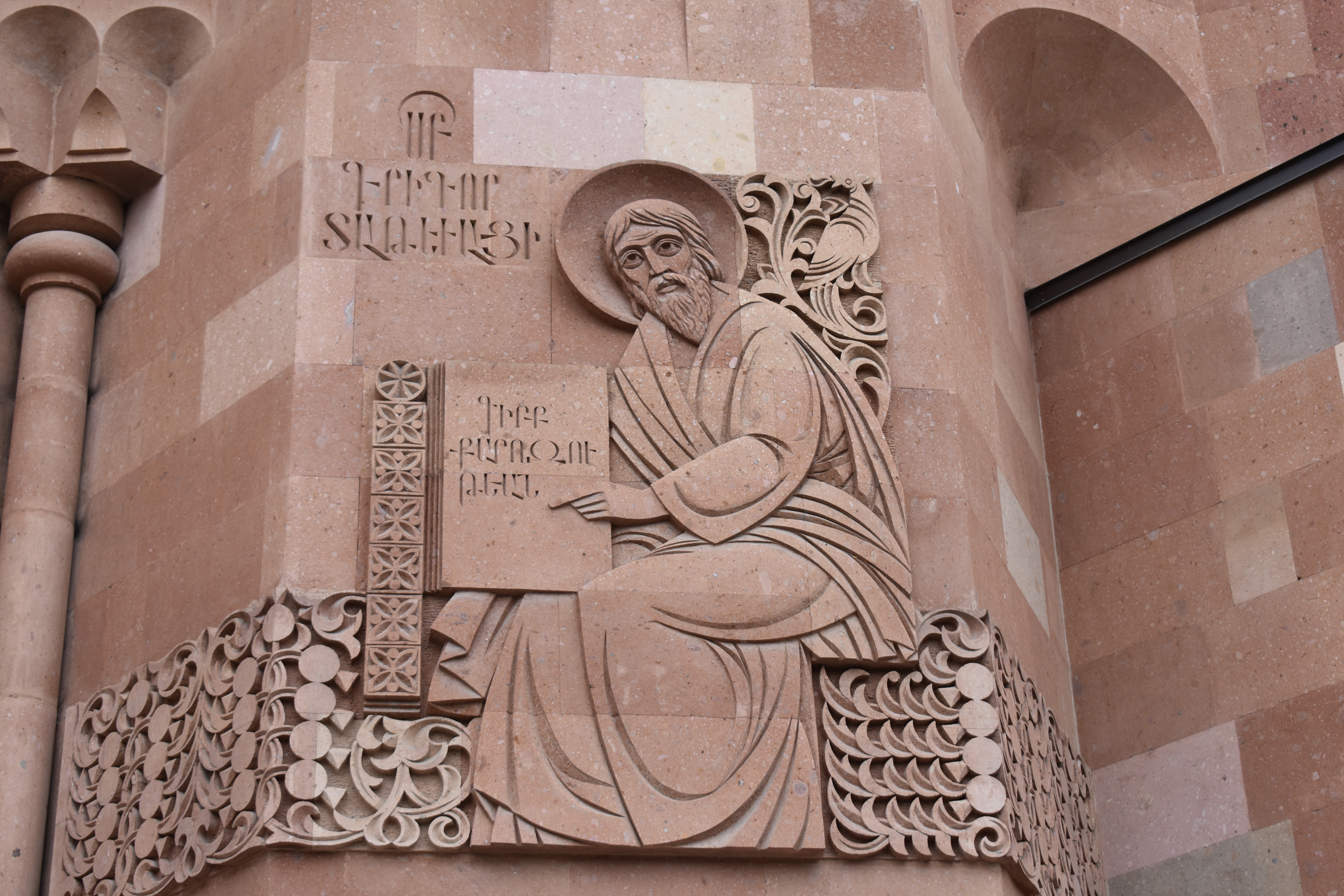
A relief of Grigor Tatevatsi

== See also ==
- Armenians in Russia
