= Aleksandr Gentsis =

- Александр Генцис

Chairman of the Russian Jewish Congress
- Incumbent
- Assumed office 2025
- Preceded by: Yuri Kanner

Personal details
- Born: 26 August 1971 (age 54) Moscow, Russian SFSR, Soviet Union
- Citizenship: Russia
- Education: MIREA

Aleksandr Yurevich Gentsis (Russian: Александр Юрьевич Генцис; born 26 August 1971 in Moscow) is a Jewish-Russian social activist who is serving as the chairman of the Russian Jewish Congress since 2025.

== Biography ==
Born August 26, 1971, in Moscow to a Jewish family. He graduated with honors from the MIREA – Russian Technological University, Faculty of Cybernetics, specializing in software engineering.

Since 1991 he is active in information technology sector, co-founded several companies that are among the leaders of the Russian IT sector.

In the late 2010s, he entered Jewish community life. In 2020, he became Chairman of the Board of Trustees of the Dor Revi'i Moscow Community. In 2022, he published a Torah with Rabbi Hirsch's commentary, one of the most popular in the Russian-speaking world.

On March 26, 2025, the Bureau of the Presidium of the Russian Jewish Congress unanimously approved the candidacy of Alexander Gentsis and recommended that the Presidium elect him as the next President of the RJC. He was then appointed Acting President of the Congress. Since May 27, 2025, he has served as President of the Russian Jewish Congress.
