= Matvey Ganapolsky =

Russian and Ukrainian journalist

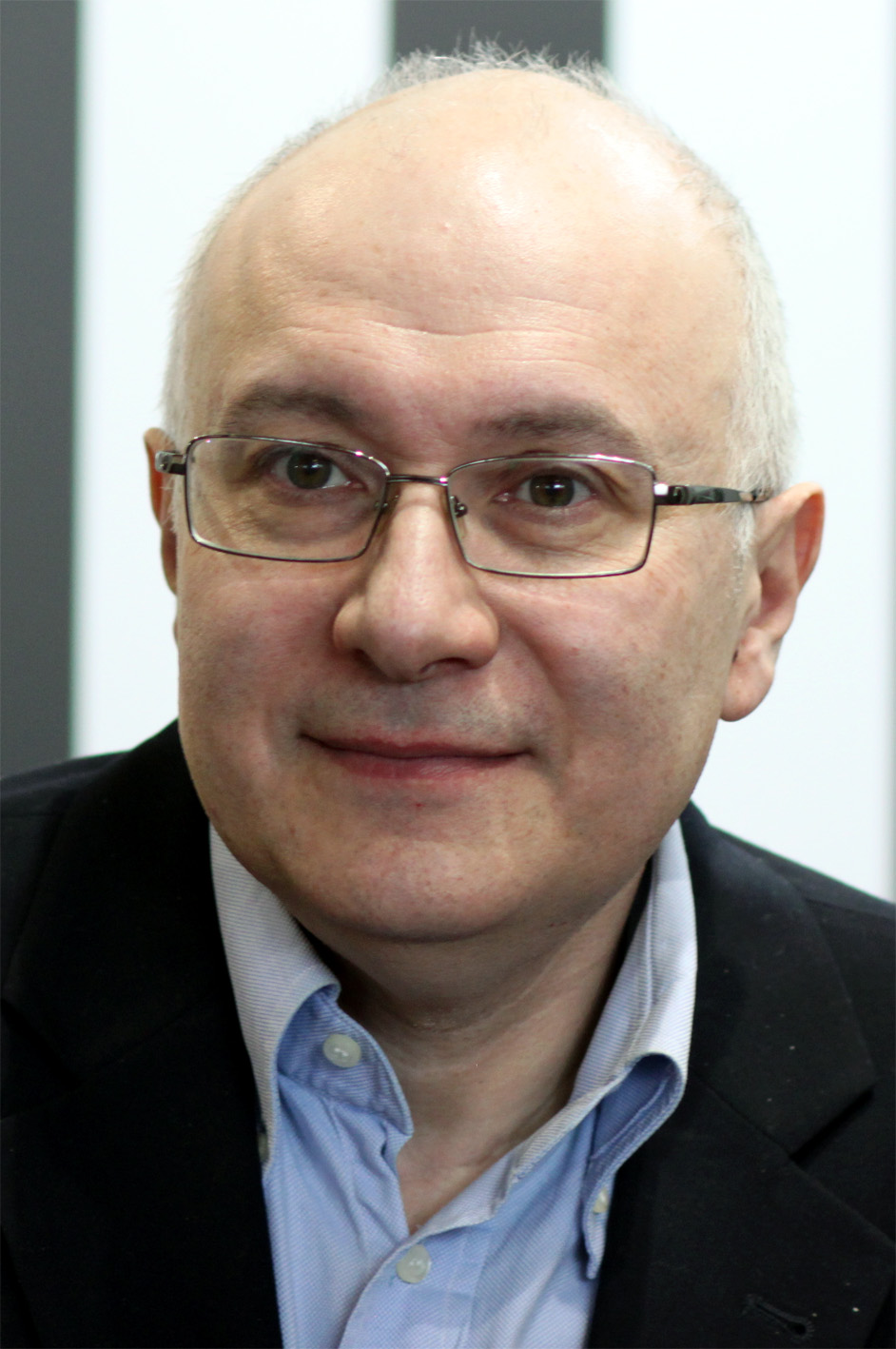
- Ganapolsky in 2011
- Born: Matvey Yuryevich Margolis; 14 December 1953 (age 71); Lviv, Ukrainian SSR, Soviet Union
- Citizenship: Ukraine • Russia
- Occupation(s): Journalist, film director, author
- Spouse: Tamara Shengeliya (m. 1998)
- Children: Ekaterina Shengeliya, Alexander Ganapolsky

Matvey Yuryevich Ganapolsky (born Margolis; Russian: Матвей Юрьевич Ганапольский, Ukrainian: Матвій Юрійович Ганапольський; born 14 December 1953) is a Russian and Ukrainian journalist who has contributed for Pryamiy kanal, Echo of Moscow, Moskovsky Komsomolets, and other media. He is also a member of the Russian Jewish Congress.

== Biography ==
Ganapolsky was born in Lviv in 1953. His mother Dina Levina was one of the last surviving eyewitnesses of the Babi Yar tragedy. Ganapolsky spent his childhood in Lviv, later leaving for Kyiv and then for Moscow where he graduated from the GITIS. From 1981 to 1986, he lived in Kyiv picking up a job at the local Variety Theatre. In 1990, he started working for the radio station Echo of Moscow where he launched the Bomond programme. In 2016, he obtained Ukrainian citizenship. As of 2020, Ganapolsky hosted a talk show named Ekho Ukrayiny on Pryamiy kanal and, until the radio station's closure in March 2022, several radio programmes on Echo of Moscow.
