= Yuri Kanner =

- Юрий Каннер
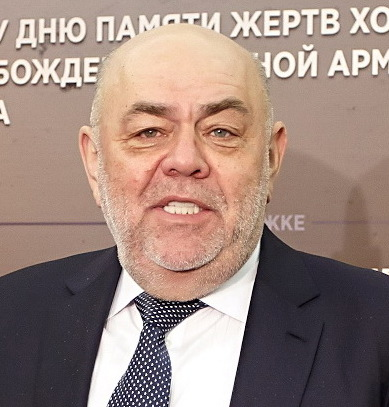

Chairman of the Russian Jewish Congress
- In office 14 May 2009 – 2025
- Preceded by: Viatcheslav Kantor
- Succeeded by: Aleksandr Gentsis

Personal details
- Born: 20 May 1955 (age 71) Kamenny Brod, Ukrainian SSR Soviet Union
- Citizenship: Russia

Yuri Isaakovich Kanner (Russian: Юрий Исаакович Каннер; born May 20, 1955, Kamenny Brod, Zhitomir Oblast, Ukrainian SSR) is a Russian Jewish public figure, entrepreneur and the 6th president of the Russian Jewish Congress since May 14, 2009.

== Biography ==
On his father's maternal side, his family tree is rooted in the Tverskoy dynasty of the Chernobyl Rebbes. His direct ancestor is the founder of the Makarovsky dynasty, the holy Rebbe Nachum Tverskoy of Makarov (1805–1852), the founder of the fourth generation of the Chernobyl dynasty. His father's maternal great-great-grandfather, great-grandfather, and grandfather—the Tverskoys—are buried in Berdichev. His paternal line through his grandfather, Kanner, can be traced back to the founder of Hasidism, the Baal Shem Tov. His maternal grandfather was Segal.

He was born in Ukraine in the urban-type settlement of Kamenny Brod, a former Jewish shtetl. In an interview with the Israeli portal IzRus, Yuri Kanner said: "I am a Jew from a shtetl whose ancestors perished in the Holocaust".

In 1976, he graduated from the Saratov Institute of Economics and was assigned to the village of Nizhnyaya Tavda in the Tyumen Oblast, where he later became deputy chairman of the Bolshevik collective farm, one of the largest in Siberia.

He has lived in Moscow since 1993. He holds a PhD in economics.

In the 1990s, he was the CEO of Intersectoral Consortium Intersplav, a company engaged in the construction and restoration of buildings in the center of the capital under investment contracts with the Moscow mayor's office. He is a co-founder of seven companies involved in construction and real estate transactions. On May 14, 2009, the Presidium of the Russian Jewish Congress approved Kanner's candidacy for the position of president of the organization. Speaking after his election as RJC president, Kanner stated: "The mission of the Russian Jewish Congress is to promote the formation of a pluralistic Jewish community in Russia that is proud of its past, firmly stands on Russian soil, and faces Jerusalem". According to Kanner, it is crucial for the RJC to develop programs that attract new people to community life. He considers the formation of self-governing and self-financing Jewish communities throughout the country to be one of the Congress's main goals.

Following the RJC's founding in 1996, Kanner became the organization's sixth president.

He is actively involved in a number of charitable and memorial projects and programs, and is the director of the international projects "Restore Dignity" and "Babi Yar of Russia", which are researching the mass graves of Holocaust victims.

On September 2, 2009, Natan Sharansky, Chairman of the Jewish Agency, and Yuri Kanner, President of the Russian Jewish Congress, signed an agreement in Moscow on strategic cooperation in the field of Jewish education in Russia.

Since 2017, he has been a member of the Public Council of the Moscow Jewish Film Festival.

On January 6, 2020, in a blog post on Echo of Moscow, he compared Bohdan Khmelnitsky to Adolf Hitler.
