= Vladimir Sloutsker =

Russian businessman and politician (1956–2025)

- Владимир Слуцкер
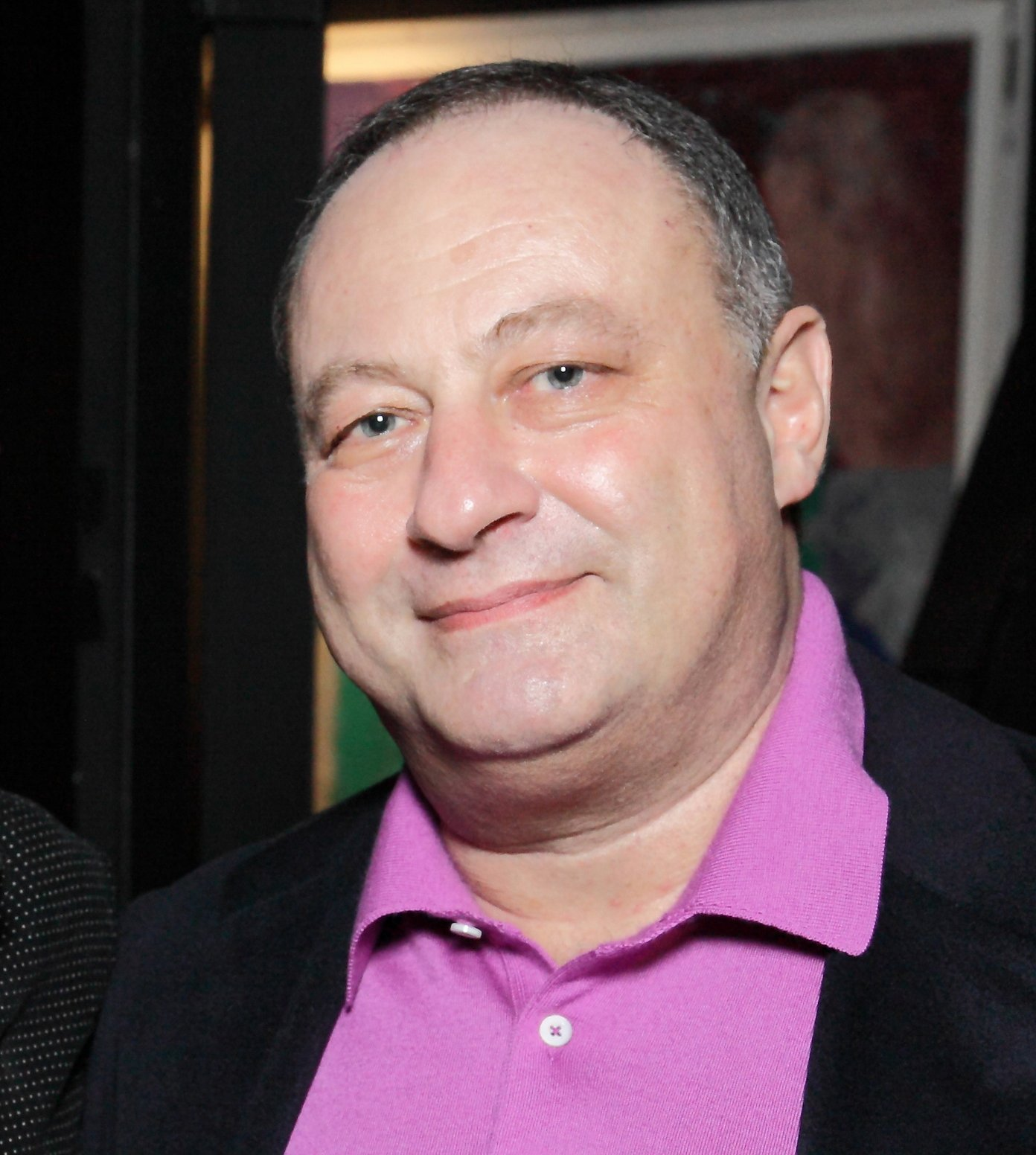
- Sloutsker in 2010

Member of the Federation Council
- In office January 2002 – September 2010
- Succeeded by: Nikolay Fyodorov
- Constituency: Chuvashia

Personal details
- Born: 27 August 1956 Moscow, Russian SFSR, Soviet Union
- Died: September 2025 (aged 69) Geneva, Switzerland
- Education: Russian University of Transport
- Occupation: Businessman

Vladimir Iosifovich Sloutsker (Russian: Владимир Иосифович Слуцкер; 27 August 1956 – September 2025) was a Russian businessman and politician who served as a senator, representing Chuvash Republic in the Russian Parliament. Sloutsker was the co-founder and President of the Israeli Jewish Congress.

== Life and career ==
Vladimir Sloutsker, real name Moshe Shlomo Slutsker, was born in Moscow on 27 August 1956.

He graduated from the Moscow Institute of Railway Engineers in 1978. After graduation, he worked at the Institute and received a candidate of technical sciences.

From 1988, he was the director of Ronar Projects (Great Britain), which supplied technical equipment to the Soviet Union, then to the CIS countries. He headed the Swiss company Acron Oil Trading.

From 1992 to 2002, he was chairman of the Board of Directors of the investment company Finvest Group (Moscow).

In 1993–1998, he served as vice president of Intermedbank.

In 2002, Vladimir became a member of the Federation Council, representing the Chuvash Republic. He worked in the Commission on National policy and relations between the state and religious organizations.

From 2006, he was Deputy Chairman of the Joint Commission on National Policy and Relations between the State and Religious Associations under the Federation Council of the Russian Federation.

In 2014, Sloutsker was ranked 40th in The Jerusalem Post's list of the 50 most influential Jews.

In 2015, Sloutsker won damages over stories critical of him that appeared on the internet.

== Personal life and death ==
In 1990, he married Olga Sergeevna Sloutsker (née Berezovskaya). In 2009, they divorced. Vladimir and Olga have two children.

In 2012, Sloutsker lost a legal battle with his ex-wife over the ownership of a house in London.

Brother Isaac Sloutsker — CEO of JSC "Novgorod Timber producers".

He was fond of karate Kyokushin, has 4 dan. In 2000, he became one of the authors of the publication "Kyokushin — martial karate. The combat purpose of the basic equipment".

In 2013, he founded the World Fighting Kyokushin Organization, an international fighting organization, together with the heads of the national Kyokushin federations of Russia, the USA and Switzerland. Since 2014, he was the president of this organization.

On 10 November 2025, the Guardian wrote that Sloutsker had died from cancer in September 2025.

== Awards ==
2007 – Order of Honour
