= Russian Jewish Congress =

The Russian Jewish Congress is a non-profit charitable fund and Russian Jewish organization. It was established in 1996 by a group of Jewish businessmen, workers and religious figures with the goal of reviving Jewish life in Russia.

It unites some of the influential and prosperous Jews in Russia, high-standing state officers, businessmen and actors of science and culture. The RJC supports existing communities and fosters the creation of new communities. At the same time helps them to strengthen and to find their own sources of funding and stipulates terms for independently allocating funds for the local communities’ needs.

== Leaders ==
Its administrating bodies are the Presidium, Council of Directors and Public Council. Heads of the Congress include Vladimir Resin, Mikhail Fridman, Yevgenia Albats, Vitaly Ginzburg, Yuliy Gusman, Andrey Kozyrev, Berel Lazar, Henri Reznik, Vladimir Solovyov, Gennady Khazanov, Matvey Ganapolsky, Mikhail Zhvanetsky, David Iakobachvili and others (data of the late 2004).

A checkup committee was headed Yakov Urinson, deputy CEO of the former OAO Unified Energy System of Russia.

=== Presidents ===
- 1996-2001: Vladimir Gusinsky
- 2001: Leonid Nevzlin
- 2001-2005: Yevgeny Satanovsky
- 2004-2005: Vladimir Slutsker
- 2005-2009: Viacheslav Kantor
- 2009–2025: Yuri Kanner
- 2025-present: Aleksandr Gentsis

== Israel National Memorial to the Red Army ==
In 2011, the Russian Jewish Congress supported the construction of the Israel National Memorial to the Red Army in the city of Netanya a.k.a. Victory Monument in Netanya. The organization donated $500,000 towards the construction of the monument, which opened on June 25, 2012.

== See also ==
- Federation of Jewish Communities of the CIS.
